= Kristo (given name) =

Male given name

- Gender: Male
- Name day: 13 November (Estonia)

Kristo is a male given name.

People named Kristo include:

- Kristo Mohan Chakma, Indian politician
- Kristo Dako (1876–1941), Albanian patriot and publisher
- Kristo Das Pal (1839–1884), Indian publicist
- Kristo Dominković (1877–1946), Serbian journalist and writer
- Kristo Floqi (1872–1951), Albanian patriot, playwright, politician, and lawyer
- Kristo Galeta (born 1983), Estonian shot putter
- Kristo Hussar (born 2002), Estonian footballer
- Kristo Kirka (1883-1955), Albanian patriot, diplomat, politician and activist
- Kristo Kollo (born 1990), Estonian volleyball and beach volleyball player
- Kristo Kondakçi (born 1991), Albanian-American conductor
- Kristo Kono (1907–1991), Albanian composer
- Kristo Kraag (born 1979), Estonian rally co-driver
- Kristo Luarasi (1876–1934), Albanian nationalist figure and publisher
- Kristo Mangelsoo (born 1993), Estonian basketball player
- Kristo Meksi (1849–1931), Albanian politician
- Kristo Negovani (1875–1905), Albanian nationalist figure, religious leader and writer
- Kristo Numpuby (21st century), guitarist and singer
- Kristo Robo (born 1948), Albanian competitive shooter
- Kristo Saage (born 1985), Estonian basketball player
- Kristo Shehu (born 2000), Greek footballer
- Kristo Shuli (1858–1938), Albanian photographer and writer
- Kristo Siimer (born 1999), Estonian biathlete
- Kristo Strickler (born 1998), American soccer player
- Kristo Tohver (born 1981), Estonian football referee
- Kristo Enn Vaga (born 1997), Estonian racing cyclist and politician
