= 2010 Rally Estonia =

1st edition of Rally Estonia

2010 Rally Estonia: 1. Mad-Croc Rally Estonia 2010
- Host country: Estonia
- Rally base: Tartu, Tartu County
- Dates run: 16 – 18 July 2010
- Start location: Kääriku, Valga County
- Finish location: Abissaare, Põlva County
- Stages: 12 (189.83 km; 117.95 miles)
- Stage surface: Gravel

Statistics
- Crews: 115 at start, 63 at finish

Overall results
- Overall winner: (Estonia) Markko Märtin (Estonia) Kristo Kraag (Estonia) MM Motorsport; 1:33:19.1

The 2010 Rally Estonia (formally known as the Mad-Croc Rally Estonia 2010) was a motor racing event for rally cars that was held over three days between 16 and 18 July 2010. It was the inaugural running of Rally Estonia. The event consisted of twelve special stages totalling 189.83 km (117.95 mi) in competitive kilometres. The stages were run on smooth gravel roads of Southern Estonia.

Local hero Markko Märtin (co-driver Kristo Kraag) was dominant as he won all twelve stages driving a Ford Focus RS WRC 03. Rising star Ott Tänak (co-driver Kuldar Sikk) finished second on his Subaru Impreza STi N14. Finnish driver Toni Gardemeister (co-driver Tapio Suominen) completed the podium driving a Ford Fiesta S2000.

== Report ==
=== Classification ===
Pos.	No.	Driver	Co-driver	Team	Car	Time	Difference
Overall classification
1	1	(Estonia) Markko Märtin	(Estonia) Kristo Kraag	(Estonia) MM Motorsport	Ford Focus RS WRC 03	1:33:19.1	0.0
2	6	(Estonia) Ott Tänak	(Estonia) Kuldar Sikk	(Estonia) MM Motorsport	Subaru Impreza STi N14	1:36:09.4	+2:50.3
3	5	(Finland) Toni Gardemeister	(Finland) Tapio Suominen	(Finland) GPOWER Ky	Ford Fiesta S2000	1:37:32.5	+4:13.4
4	17	(Estonia) Margus Murakas	(Estonia) Jaago Kuriks	(Estonia) Prorehv Rally Team	Mitsubishi Lancer Evo IX	1:38:07.4	+4:48.3
5	4	(Czech Republic) Martin Prokop	(Czech Republic) Jan Tománek	(Czech Republic) Czech Ford National Team	Ford Fiesta S2000	1:38:38.7	+5:19.6
6	14	(Estonia) Marko Kasepõld	(Estonia) Rein Jõessar	(Estonia) Märjamaa Rally Team	Mitsubishi Lancer Evo VI	1:39:31.0	+6:11.9
7	12	(Estonia) Ago Ahu	(Estonia) Kalle Ahu	(Estonia) Sar-Tech Motorsport	Subaru Impreza WRX STi	1:39:48.5	+6:29.4
8	14	(Latvia) Raimonds Kisiels	(Latvia) Arnis Ronis	(Latvia) Skandi Auto rallija komanda	Mitsubishi Lancer WRC 05	1:40:07.0	+6:47.9
9	7	(Finland) Marko Kakko	(Finland) Panu Plosila	(Finland) JMP-Yhtiö	Ford Fiesta S2000	1:40:09.3	+6:50.2
10	9	(Estonia) Margus Remmak	(Estonia) Urmas Roosimaa	(Estonia) Harju KEK Ralliklubi	Mitsubishi Lancer Evo IX	1:41:16.3	+7:57.2

=== Special stages ===
Date	No.	Stage name	Distance	Winners	Car	Time	Rally leaders
16 July	SS1	Kääriku	4.56 km	Märtin / Kraag	Ford Focus RS WRC 03	2:22.8	Märtin / Kraag
16 July	SS2	Koikküla	13.00 km	Märtin / Kraag	Ford Focus RS WRC 03	6:43.6	Märtin / Kraag
16 July	SS3	Vaabina	30.41 km	Märtin / Kraag	Ford Focus RS WRC 03	14:38.8	Märtin / Kraag
17 July	SS4	Raiga 1	12.15 km	Märtin / Kraag	Ford Focus RS WRC 03	5:44.9	Märtin / Kraag
17 July	SS5	Kambja 1	15.41 km	Märtin / Kraag	Ford Focus RS WRC 03	7:27.6	Märtin / Kraag
17 July	SS6	Sulaoja 1	25.40 km	Märtin / Kraag	Ford Focus RS WRC 03	12:14.9	Märtin / Kraag
17 July	SS7	Raiga 2	12.15 km	Märtin / Kraag	Ford Focus RS WRC 03	5:54.3	Märtin / Kraag
17 July	SS8	Kambja 2	15.41 km	Märtin / Kraag	Ford Focus RS WRC 03	7:22.1	Märtin / Kraag
17 July	SS9	Sulaoja 2	25.40 km	Märtin / Kraag	Ford Focus RS WRC 03	12:04.6	Märtin / Kraag
18 July	SS10	Rüa	11.07 km	Märtin / Kraag	Ford Focus RS WRC 03	6:14.4	Märtin / Kraag
18 July	SS11	Jõksi	14.14 km	Märtin / Kraag	Ford Focus RS WRC 03	7:14.7	Märtin / Kraag
18 July	SS12	Abissaare	10.73 km	Märtin / Kraag	Ford Focus RS WRC 03	5:16.4	Märtin / Kraag
