= 2019 Rally Estonia =

9th edition of Rally Estonia

2019 Rally Estonia: 9. Shell Helix Rally Estonia 2019
- Host country: Estonia
- Rally base: Otepää, Valga County
- Dates run: 12 – 14 July 2019
- Start location: Maaritsa, Põlva County
- Finish location: Tartu, Tartu County
- Stages: 15 (151.98 km; 94.44 miles)
- Stage surface: Gravel
- Transport distance: 634.17 km (394.05 miles)
- Overall distance: 795.15 km (494.08 miles)

Statistics
- Crews: 105 at start, 67 at finish

Overall results
- Overall winner: (Estonia) Ott Tänak (Estonia) Martin Järveoja (Japan) Toyota Gazoo Racing WRT; 1:15:38.4

The 2019 Rally Estonia (formally known as the Shell Helix Rally Estonia 2019) was a motor racing event for rally cars that was held over three days between 12 and 14 July 2019. It marked the ninth running of Rally Estonia. The event consisted of fifteen special stages totalling 151.98 km (94.44 mi) in competitive kilometres. The stages were run on smooth gravel roads of Southern Estonia. Two street stages were also held during the rally, in Tartu and in Elva. Rally headquarters and service park were based in Otepää, at the Tehvandi Sports Center, while city of Tartu hosted the ceremonial start and finish.

The 2019 edition was the first ever Official WRC Promotional Event with all the current WRC works teams (Toyota, M-Sport, Hyundai and Citroën) featured in the line-up. Ott Tänak & Martin Järveoja repeated last year's win, this time ahead of Andreas Mikkelsen & Anders Jæger-Amland. Esapekka Lappi & Janne Ferm completed the podium.

== Background ==
=== Entry list ===
No.	Driver	Co-Driver	Team	Car	Tyre
World Rally Car entries
1	(Estonia) Ott Tänak	(Estonia) Martin Järveoja	(Japan) Toyota Gazoo Racing WRT	Toyota Yaris WRC	MI
2	(United Kingdom) Elfyn Evans	(United Kingdom) Scott Martin	(United Kingdom) M-Sport Ford WRT	Ford Fiesta WRC	MI
3	(Norway) Andreas Mikkelsen	(Norway) Anders Jæger-Amland	(South Korea) Hyundai Motorsport N	Hyundai i20 Coupe WRC	MI
4	(Finland) Esapekka Lappi	(Finland) Janne Ferm	(France) Citroën Total WRT	Citroën C3 WRC	MI
5	(Republic of Ireland) Craig Breen	(Republic of Ireland) Paul Nagle	(South Korea) Hyundai Motorsport N	Hyundai i20 Coupe WRC	MI
6	(Ukraine) Valeriy Gorban	(Estonia) Sergei Larens	(Ukraine) Eurolamp World Rally Team	Mini John Cooper Works WRC	P
7	(Estonia) Georg Gross	(Estonia) Raigo Mõlder	(Estonia) OT Racing	Ford Fiesta WRC	MI
8	(Estonia) Markko Märtin	(Estonia) Kristo Kraag	(Estonia) Markko Märtin	Ford Fiesta WRC	MI
Group R entries
9	(Finland) Teemu Suninen	(Finland) Jarmo Lehtinen	(United Kingdom) M-Sport Ford WRT	Ford Fiesta R5 Mk. II	MI
10	(Finland) Eerik Pietarinen	(Finland) Juhana Raitanen	(Finland) TGS Worldwide	Škoda Fabia R5 Evo	P
11	(Japan) Takamoto Katsuta	(United Kingdom) Daniel Barritt	(Finland) Tommi Mäkinen Racing	Ford Fiesta R5 Mk. II	P
12	(Russia) Nikolay Gryazin	(Russia) Yaroslav Fedorov	(Latvia) Sports Racing Technologies	Škoda Fabia R5	P
14	(Latvia) Oliver Solberg	(Republic of Ireland) Aaron Johnston	(Latvia) Sports Racing Technologies	Volkswagen Polo GTI R5	P
15	(Estonia) Raul Jeets	(Estonia) Andrus Toom	(Estonia) Tehase Auto	Škoda Fabia R5	MI
16	(Estonia) Rainer Aus	(Estonia) Simo Koskinen	(Finland) TGS Worldwide	Škoda Fabia R5	P
17	(Norway) Kenneth Johnsrød	(Norway) Dyre Erling Fredriksen	(Norway) Johnsrød Racing	Ford Fiesta R5	P
18	(Estonia) Priit Koik	(Estonia) Kristo Tamm	(Estonia) Kaur Motorsport	Ford Fiesta R5	MI
20	(Sweden) Robert Blomberg	(Sweden) Ida Bood	(Sweden) Robert Blomberg	Škoda Fabia R5	P
21	(Russia) Radik Shaymiev	(Russia) Maxim Tsvetkov	(Russia) TAIF Motorsport	Ford Fiesta R5	MI
22	(Estonia) Karl Martin Volver	(Estonia) Margus Jõerand	(Finland) TGS Worldwide	Škoda Fabia R5	P
23	(Chile) Emilio Fernandez	(Spain) Axel Coronado	(Turkey) Toksport WRT	Škoda Fabia R5	MI
26	(India) Sanjay Takale	(Latvia) Edgars Svencis	(Latvia) Baltic Motorsport Promotion	Ford Fiesta R2	P
27	(Latvia) Arnis Alksnis	(Latvia) Gints Pētersons	(Latvia) Rallyworkshop-ERST Finance	Peugeot 208 R2	P
28	(Russia) Alexander Kudryavtsev	(Russia) Yuri Kulikov	(Estonia) ALM Motorsport	Peugeot 208 R2	P
29	(Sweden) William Binbach	(Sweden) Ida Lidebjer Granberg	(Sweden) William Binbach	Peugeot 208 R2	P
30	(Chile) Jose Tomas Fernandez	(Chile) Carlos Garrafa	(Latvia) Baltic Motorsport Promotion	Ford Fiesta R2	P
31	(Estonia) Georg Linnamäe	(Ukraine) Volodymyr Korsia	(Estonia) ALM Motorsport	Peugeot 208 R2	P
32	(France) Adrien Fourmaux	(Belgium) Renaud Jamoul	(France) Adrien Fourmaux	Ford Fiesta R2T	P
33	(Latvia) Adam Westlund	(Sweden) Joakim Sjöberg	(Latvia) Sports Racing Technologies	Peugeot 208 R2	P
34	(Estonia) Gregor Jeets	(Estonia) Kuldar Sikk	(Estonia) Tehase Auto	Ford Fiesta R2T	P
35	(Estonia) Kaspar Kasari	(Estonia) Gabriel Müürsepp	(Estonia) OT Racing	Ford Fiesta R2T	P
36	(Estonia) Roland Poom	(Estonia) Ken Järveoja	(Estonia) Roland Poom	Ford Fiesta R2T	P
37	(Estonia) Robert Virves	(Estonia) Sander Pruul	(Estonia) OT Racing	Ford Fiesta R2T	P
38	(Estonia) Ken Torn	(Estonia) Kauri Pannas	(Estonia) OT Racing	Ford Fiesta R2T	P
Group N entries
39	(Latvia) Emīls Blūms	(Latvia) Didzis Eglītis	(Latvia) Rallyworkshop-ERST Finance	Mitsubishi Lancer Evo IX	P
40	(Latvia) Edijs Bergmanis	(Latvia) Edgars Grīns	(Latvia) Rallyworkshop-ERST Finance	Mitsubishi Lancer Evo IX	P
41	(Latvia) Ralfs Sirmacis	(Latvia) Ralfs Igaveņš	(Latvia) Sporta Klubs Autostils Rally Team	Mitsubishi Lancer Evo X	P
42	(Russia) Denis Rostilov	(Russia) Georgy Troshkin	(Latvia) Neiksans Rallysport	Mitsubishi Lancer Evo IX	P
43	(Latvia) Edgars Balodis	(Latvia) Lasma Tole	(Latvia) Rallyworkshop-ERST Finance	Mitsubishi Lancer Evo VIII	P
44	(Sweden) Stig Andervang	(Sweden) Robin Eriksson	(Sweden) Stig Andervang	Mitsubishi Lancer Evo IX	P
45	(Estonia) Aiko Aigro	(Estonia) Kermo Kärtmann	(Estonia) Tikkri Motorsport	Mitsubishi Lancer Evo VIII	P
53	(Estonia) Aleksei Semenov	(Russia) Igor Marov	(Estonia) Aleksei Semenov	Mitsubishi Lancer Evo X	MI
54	(Estonia) Siim Liivamägi	(Estonia) Edvin Parisalu	(Estonia) Kupatama Motorsport	Mitsubishi Lancer Evo VI	MI
55	(Estonia) Rünno Ubinhain	(Estonia) Allan Ilves	(Estonia) Kupatama Motorsport	Mitsubishi Lancer Evo X	P
57	(Estonia) Mirko Usin	(Estonia) Janek Tamm	(Estonia) ALM Motorsport	Mitsubishi Lancer Evo IX	P
58	(Latvia) Kristaps Sarma	(Latvia) Ervīns Zgirskis	(Latvia) Rallyworkshop-ERST Finance	Mitsubishi Lancer Evo IX	P
59	(Poland) Mikołaj Kempa	(Poland) Marcin Szeja	(Estonia) Kaur Motorsport	Mitsubishi Lancer Evo IV	P
60	(Latvia) Krišjānis Zintis Putniņš	(Latvia) Mārtiņš Puriņš	(Latvia) Rallyworkshop-ERST Finance	Subaru Impreza	P
61	(Estonia) Henri Franke	(Estonia) Arvo Liimann	(Estonia) Cueks Racing	Subaru Impreza	P
62	(Latvia) Jurģis Meisters	(Latvia) Kalvis Blūms	(Latvia) Rallyworkshop-ERST Finance	Mitsubishi Lancer Evo VI	P
63	(Russia) Vadim Kuznetsov	(Russia) Roman Kapustin	(Estonia) ALM Motorsport	Mitsubishi Lancer Evo VIII	MI
Other notable entries
19	(Estonia) Egon Kaur	(Estonia) Silver Simm	(Estonia) Kaur Motorsport	Ford Fiesta Proto	P
24	(Estonia) Alexander Mikhaylov	(Latvia) Normunds Kokins	(Latvia) Neiksans Rallysport	Ford Fiesta NRC	MI
56	(Russia) Gleb Zavolokin	(Russia) Mikhail Soskin	(Russia) F-motors Rally Team	Ford Fiesta Proto	P

== Report ==
=== Classification ===
Pos.	No.	Driver	Co-driver	Team	Car	Time	Difference
Overall classification
1	1	(Estonia) Ott Tänak	(Estonia) Martin Järveoja	(Japan) Toyota Gazoo Racing WRT	Toyota Yaris WRC	1:15:38.4	0.0
2	3	(Norway) Andreas Mikkelsen	(Norway) Anders Jæger-Amland	(South Korea) Hyundai Motorsport N	Hyundai i20 Coupe WRC	1:16:41.9	+1:03.5
3	4	(Finland) Esapekka Lappi	(Finland) Janne Ferm	(France) Citroën Total WRT	Citroën C3 WRC	1:17:05.5	+1:27.1
4	2	(United Kingdom) Elfyn Evans	(United Kingdom) Scott Martin	(United Kingdom) M-Sport Ford WRT	Ford Fiesta WRC	1:17:26.1	+1:47.7
5	5	(Republic of Ireland) Craig Breen	(Republic of Ireland) Paul Nagle	(South Korea) Hyundai Motorsport N	Hyundai i20 Coupe WRC	1:17:34.8	+1:56.4
6	8	(Estonia) Markko Märtin	(Estonia) Kristo Kraag	(Estonia) Markko Märtin	Ford Fiesta WRC	1:19:33.5	+3:55.1
7	14	(Latvia) Oliver Solberg	(Republic of Ireland) Aaron Johnston	(Latvia) Sports Racing Technologies	Volkswagen Polo GTI R5	1:19:57.8	+4:19.4
8	16	(Estonia) Rainer Aus	(Estonia) Simo Koskinen	(Finland) TGS Worldwide	Škoda Fabia R5	1:21:26.3	+5:47.9
9	10	(Finland) Eerik Pietarinen	(Finland) Juhana Raitanen	(Finland) TGS Worldwide	Škoda Fabia R5 Evo	1:21:27.4	+5:49.0
10	6	(Ukraine) Valeriy Gorban	(Estonia) Sergei Larens	(Ukraine) Eurolamp World Rally Team	Mini John Cooper Works WRC	1:21:57.4	+6:19.0

=== Special stages ===
Date	No.	Stage name	Distance	Winners	Car	Time	Rally leaders
12 July	—	Raiga [Shakedown]	6.40 km	Tänak / Järveoja	Toyota Yaris WRC	2:52.3	—N/a
13 July	SS1	Maaritsa 1	14.56 km	Tänak / Järveoja	Toyota Yaris WRC	8:00.1	Tänak / Järveoja
13 July	SS2	Arula 1	10.95 km	Tänak / Järveoja	Toyota Yaris WRC	5:27.2	Tänak / Järveoja
13 July	SS3	Maaritsa 2	14.56 km	Tänak / Järveoja	Toyota Yaris WRC	7:55.1	Tänak / Järveoja
13 July	SS4	Arula 2	10.95 km	Mikkelsen / Jæger-Amland	Hyundai i20 Coupe WRC	5:28.5	Tänak / Järveoja
13 July	SS5	Rüa 1	9.30 km	Tänak / Järveoja	Toyota Yaris WRC	5:07.9	Tänak / Järveoja
13 July	SS6	Puugi 1	10.21 km	Tänak / Järveoja	Toyota Yaris WRC	4:31.8	Tänak / Järveoja
13 July	SS7	Rüa 2	9.30 km	Tänak / Järveoja	Toyota Yaris WRC	5:08.6	Tänak / Järveoja
13 July	SS8	Puugi 2	10.21 km	Tänak / Järveoja	Toyota Yaris WRC	4:24.8	Tänak / Järveoja
13 July	SS9	Elva City	1.78 km	Evans / Martin	Ford Fiesta WRC	1:30.4	Tänak / Järveoja
14 July	SS10	Aiaste 1	7.70 km	Tänak / Järveoja	Toyota Yaris WRC	3:29.9	Tänak / Järveoja
14 July	SS11	Prangli 1	17.01 km	Tänak / Järveoja	Toyota Yaris WRC	8:00.7	Tänak / Järveoja
14 July	SS12	Aiaste 2	7.70 km	Tänak / Järveoja	Toyota Yaris WRC	3:30.0	Tänak / Järveoja
14 July	SS13	Prangli 2	17.01 km	Tänak / Järveoja	Toyota Yaris WRC	7:56.4	Tänak / Järveoja
14 July	SS14	Saverna	9.05 km	Tänak / Järveoja	Toyota Yaris WRC	3:50.4	Tänak / Järveoja
14 July	SS15	Tartu City	1.43 km	Tänak / Järveoja	Toyota Yaris WRC	1:05.2	Tänak / Järveoja
