= Kristo Kondakçi =

Albanian-American conductor

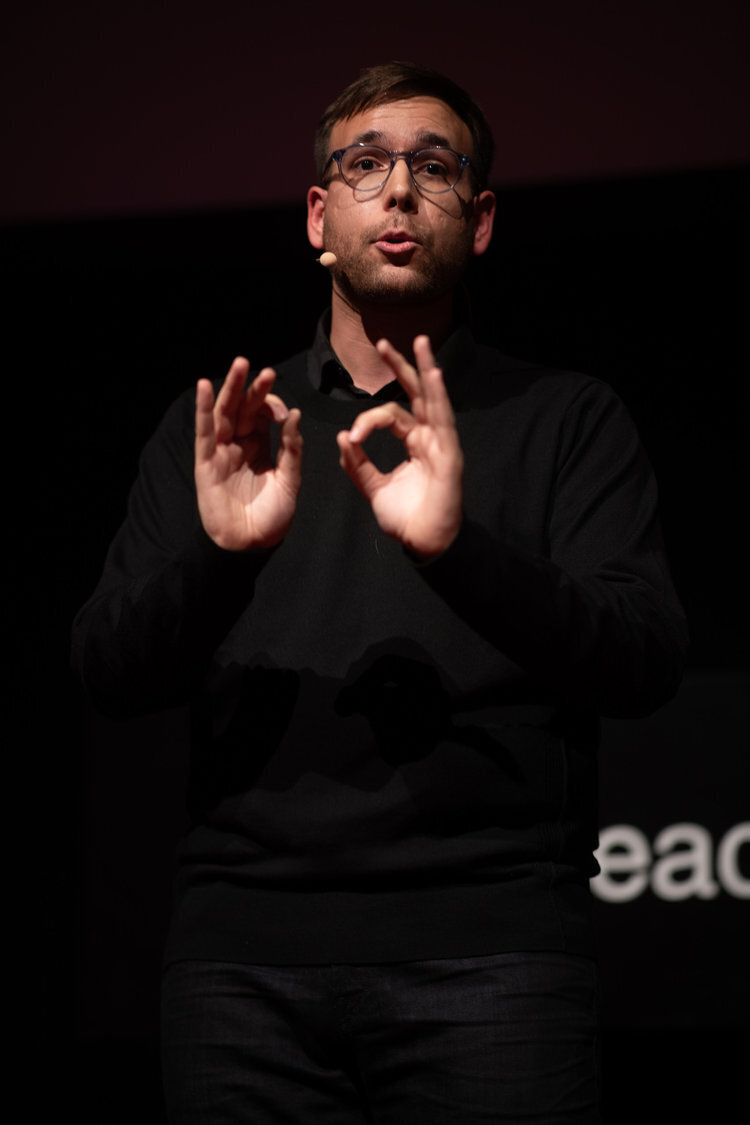
- Born: 30 June 1991 (age 35); Tirana, Albania
- Occupation: Conductor
- Years active: 2015–present
- Organization(s): National Albanian Orchestra, Kendall Square Orchestra, Eureka Ensemble, Berklee College of Music
- Spouse: Chloe Kondakçi (married 2022-)
- Website: www.kristokondakci.com

Kristo Kondakçi (born 30 June 1991) is an Albanian-American conductor, recognized for his influential roles in the music community and his commitment to social impact through music. He currently serves as the David and Janet McCue music director of the Kendall Square Orchestra, where he actively collaborates with professionals from the science and technology sectors. This role allows him to merge musical performance with industry innovation, fostering an interdisciplinary approach that enhances both the arts and the scientific community.

Kondakçi made his professional conducting debut with the Albanian National Orchestra in 2014 and has since led performances across the United States and Europe, including his U.S. opera debut with Enigma Chamber Opera in 2020, which received critical acclaim from the Boston Globe. He previously served as music director of the Narragansett Bay Symphony Community Orchestra in Rhode Island (2020–2024), interim director of orchestras at the University of Massachusetts, Amherst (2019) as well as assistant conductor with the Boston Landmarks Orchestra (2015–2017) and conducting fellow of the Boston Philharmonic Orchestra and the Boston Philharmonic Youth Orchestra (2015-2018).

In addition to his conducting roles, Kondakçi is a passionate educator and advocate for the transformative power of music. He serves as an assistant professor at the Berklee College of Music and as a non-resident Tutor in Music at Harvard University. Notably, he co-founded the Women's Chorus, a choral program that supports women experiencing homelessness in Boston, and the Eureka Ensemble, which uses music to engage and support underserved communities. His dedication extends beyond performance and education into significant community service, exemplified by his involvement in founding and directing initiatives that address social issues through the arts.

In 2019, the Berklee College of Music honored Kondakçi with a "Berklee Urban Service Award" (BUSA). "The Berklee Urban Service Awards celebrate community members, partner organizations, politicians, artists, and Berklee affiliates who inspire social change in the Greater Boston area". He was also profiled by the Christian Science Monitor in their "Difference-Makers" Series.

== Early life and education ==
Kristo Kondakçi was born in Tirana, Albania in 1991. He and his family immigrated to the United States as political refugees when Kondakçi was five years old, settling in Boston, MA.

=== Political persecution in Albania ===
Before their immigration to the United States, Kristo Kondakçi’s family endured severe persecution under the Albanian Communist regime led by Enver Hoxha in the mid-20th century. His maternal grandfather, Beqir Omari, was imprisoned for eight years in the notorious Spaç Prison due to performing Western music. Beqir’s brother, Gramoz, a virtuoso musician and doctor, was executed by the regime in 1968. Their father, Eqerem Omari, a distinguished agricultural scientist and a leading grain specialist in Albania, also faced significant persecution. Notably, Eqerem was a relative of Bahri Omari, a prominent Albanian politician. After serving as the chief editor of Dielli, the first Albanian-American newspaper, in the United States in 1914, Bahri returned to Albania in the 1920s. He held various significant roles, including the general secretary of the National Democratic Party of Albania and later as the minister of foreign affairs in the 1940s. Following the establishment of the Communist regime in 1945, Bahri was executed after a politically motivated trial.

The oppressive political climate led to the execution, imprisonment, exile, or internment of many other of Kondakçi's family members. In a turn of fate, Beqir Omari immigrated to the United States, where he played a pivotal role in raising Kristo and his brother, Gramoz Kondakçi. At home, Beqir would often engage in music and share poignant stories of the family's struggles and resilience in Albania, profoundly influencing Kondakçi's own musical journey with traditional Albanian and Western classical music.

=== Education ===
Kristo Kondakçi's main instrument is the piano, which he learned from a young age. He attended Sacred Heart School in Quincy, Massachusetts, and continued at Boston College High School, graduating in 2009. At the age of fifteen, Kondakçi enrolled into the New England Conservatory preparatory division, studying piano with Tatyana Dudochkin, composition with Rodney Lister, conducting with Courtney Lewis. He also took lessons with Gunther Schuller. After graduating high school, he continued his studies at New England Conservatory, completing an Undergraduate degree in Composition with composer Michael Gandolfi (2013) and a Master's degree in Conducting with Charles Peltz (2015). During his undergraduate tenure, he also worked closely with conductor Hugh Wolff.

== Conducting career ==
=== Overview ===
In 2014, while Kondakçi was pursuing his master's degree in conducting at New England Conservatory, he received an invitation from the National Theatre of Opera and Ballet of Albania (T.K.O.B.) to conduct the National Albanian Orchestra, which launched his professional conducting career. He appeared in two performances with the orchestra, conducting the overture from Wagner's opera Tannhäuser and Mahler's Symphony No. 1. The concerts were successful, receiving praise from the Albanian public and press. Kondakçi maintains close ties with the T.K.O.B.

Between 2015-2017, Kristo Kondakçi served as the assistant conductor of the Boston Landmarks Orchestra, a professional orchestra in Boston, MA dedicated to making great music accessible to the whole community. During his time with the orchestra, Kondakçi reinvigorated the orchestra's community educational programming, working closely with underrepresented communities across Boston, such as at-risk youth and blind and deaf children. Between 2015-2018, Kondakçi also served as the conducting fellow of the Boston Philharmonic Orchestra (BPO) and Boston Philharmonic Youth Orchestra. He also assisted BPO conductor Benjamin Zander in concerts around the globe, including performances of Mahler's Symphony No. 2 in Kuala Lumpur, Malaysia with the Malaysian Philharmonic Orchestra (2015).

During his tenure with Boston Philharmonic, Kondakçi traveled with the Boston Philharmonic Youth Orchestra on three international tours. He also designed and conducted the annual Young Composer's Initiative in partnership with the composition departments at New England Conservatory, Boston Conservatory, Berklee School of Music, and Harvard University, among others.

In 2017, Kondakçi partnered with cellist Alan Toda-Ambaras to found the Eureka Ensemble, a professional orchestra based in Boston, dedicated to nurturing social impact through music. Since its founding, the ensemble has partnered with acclaimed artists such as violist Kim Kashkashian and violinist Midori, among others, to engage in community-intensive programming focusing on underserved communities and the issues they face, such as immigrant and refugee youth and those impacted by homelessness.

In April 2018, Kondakçi was engaged by a global pharmaceutical company to help launch an orchestra for the life sciences and technology community in Kendall Square, Cambridge, MA. Together with scientists Kelly Clark and Elena Spencer, they formed the Kendall Square Orchestra (K²O). Composed of over 70 musicians, each a professional within the scientific and technological spheres, K²O epitomizes the synergy between artistry and intellect. Drawing talent from over 40 local science and technology companies and academic institutions, the orchestra serves as a platform for collaboration, innovation, and inspiration.

In June 2018, Kondakçi made his European opera conducting debut at the Vienna Summer Music Festival in Vienna, Austria, conducting the world premiere of Scott Joiner's"The Bridesmaids". Kondakçi made his U.S. opera conducting debut in January 2020, directing performances of Benjamin Britten's Turn of the Screw with Enigma Chamber Opera.

=== Guest Conducting and Other Posts ===
In addition to his post with the Kendall Square Orchestra, Kristo Kondakçi maintains an active guest conducting profile with orchestras in both the United States and Europe. He is a guest conductor with the National Albanian Orchestra. He also acts as a cover conductor for multiple orchestras across New England, including the Portland Symphony Orchestra (ME).

Between 2020-2024, Kondakçi was the music director of the Narragansett Bay Symphony Community Orchestra (NaBSCO), based in Providence, RI.

== Social Impact Work ==
=== The Women's Chorus ===
In 2018, Kristo Kondakçi launched the Sheltering Voices Initiative with Eureka Ensemble, partnering with Boston area women's shelters such as Pine Street Inn, Rosie's Place, and Women's Lunch Place to "empower women artists and composers, homeless women, educate the public on domestic abuse issues, and support local homeless shelters". This initiative featured a choir composed of women experiencing homelessness or poverty and included a commissioned work by composer Stephanie Ann Boyd. The project gained significant public attention, highlighted by a feature in a NowThis News video that has amassed over 3 million views on social media, effectively raising awareness about the issues the initiative seeks to address.

Building upon the success and public engagement of the Sheltering Voices Initiative, Kristo Kondakçi, in collaboration with entrepreneur David McCue, co-founded the Women's Chorus later in 2018. This program was established in partnership with the Women’s Lunch Place, a shelter that provides essential services to women facing homelessness or poverty in Boston. The Women’s Chorus is designed to use the therapeutic power of music to empower its participants, offering them not just musical instruction but also a supportive community environment. It aims to foster healing and personal growth through regular musical practice and performance. Since its inception, the chorus has served a diverse group of more than 150 women aged 17 to 82, enhancing their well-being and providing a creative outlet for expression and healing.

=== Desea Soñar (I want to dream) Program ===
In 2018, under Kondakçi's leadership, Eureka Ensemble partnered with La Colaborativa (formerly known as the Chelsea Collaborative) to create an after-school music education program for newly arrived immigrant and refugee youth in Chelsea and East Boston, MA called "Desea Soñar" (I want to dream). "Desea Soñar is a year-long program that teaches students how to engage with their community through songwriting and to instill self-confidence through proficiency in an instrument and participation in a musical ensemble. The musical program utilizes cultural exploration and social-emotional skill building to help students reflect on their journeys and connect to peers with similar experiences".

=== El Mesías: Handel's Messiah in Spanish ===
In 2019, Kristo Kondakçi led an innovative cultural adaptation of George Frideric Handel's famed oratorio, Messiah, by spearheading its transcription into Spanish with the collaboration of the Eureka Ensemble team. This groundbreaking project not only translated the text but also reimagined the iconic work to resonate deeply with Latinx audiences, reflecting Kondakçi’s commitment to making classical music accessible and relevant to diverse communities.

The premiere of the Spanish version of Messiah took place in 2019, performed by the Eureka Ensemble in Boston. This event was more than just a concert; it was a community gathering that brought together Latinx community members from across Boston. A virtual rendition of this version was presented in 2020 via Facebook Live during the pandemic and reached over 400,000 viewers across 9 countries, primarily in South America.

=== Symphony for Science ===
In 2019, under Kondakçi's leadership, the Kendall Square Orchestra team designed an innovative benefit event titled "Symphony for Science", featuring a combination of talks by local scientific leaders and musical performances to support healthcare and science related causes. The inaugural "Symphony for Science" took place on May 20, 2019, at Boston's Symphony Hall to benefit Massachusetts General Hospital's Frontotemporal Dementia Research Unit. The event raised over $42,000 and featured members of the Boston Symphony Orchestra, including Boston Pops conductor Keith Lockhart on piano.

In 2020, due to the lockdowns during the COVID-19 Pandemic, Symphony for Science took place virtually to benefit Next Step, a Cambridge community organization that "provides programming for young individuals (age 14-29) managing life-threatening illnesses including rare genetic diseases, cancer and HIV. The use of music therapy is a key element of their programming and services". Symphony for Science 2020 raised over $75,000.

Symphony for Science 2022 took place on May 23, 2022, at Symphony Hall Boston to benefit Science Club for Girls and featured Nobel Prize winner Esther Duflo as keynote speaker. The event raised over $50,000 for Science Club for Girls.

=== COVID-19: Boston Hope Music ===
In 2020, in response to the COVID-19 Pandemic and the resulting lockdowns, Kristo Kondakçi joined Dr. Lisa Wong and Dr. Ronald Hirschberg to help form "Boston Hope Music" (BHM) at Boston Hope Hospital, a 1000-bed field hospital that was set up by the City of Boston in 2020. This field hospital, based at the Boston Convention Center, was designed to care for Covid-positive patients recovering from Covid after hospital discharge, as well as homeless patients who were Covid-positive in need of respite care and isolation. Boston Hope Music gathered over 100 musicians from the around the city of Boston together who submitted "musical doses" electronically. These were curated into over 25 playlists that patients could access via Samsung tablets three times a day to promote healing.

The BHM team also created a program in partnership with Massachusetts General Hospital, New England Conservatory, and the Eureka Ensemble to focus on the growing needs of frontline healthcare workers by connecting them private lessons on instruments of their choice as well as songwriting workshops. When the vaccine became available, BHM organized musicians to play for members of the general public waiting in line for the vaccinations at the Red Sox's Fenway Park, Hynes Convention Center, the Reggie Lewis Center and Mass General's satellite site at Assembly Row in Somerville.

=== Rising Tides ===
In 2020, Kristo Kondakçi spearheaded "Rising Tides," an initiative led by Eureka Ensemble that sought to illuminate the local impacts of climate change in New England through a series of performances and educational programs. Rising Tides was conducted in partnership with Dean and scientist Robert F. Chen of the School for the Environment (SFE) at the University of Massachusetts Boston and received backing from the National Endowment for the Arts, the Cabot Family Charitable Trust, Brookline Bank, and the Boston Cultural Council. The project was mentioned at the EarthShot Prize in 2022, organized by Prince William.

Rising Tides was designed to stimulate dialogue and raise awareness by integrating leaders from academic, business, and creative communities, focusing on localized rather than global effects of climate change and promoting community and individual actions toward sustainable solutions. Through its comprehensive and creative approach, the program effectively utilized the arts to highlight and address the urgent issue of climate change, demonstrating the power of music to foster significant social engagement and change.

== Academic and Speaking Career ==
=== Overview ===
Kristo Kondakçi is currently an assistant professor at the Berklee College of Music and a non-resident music tutor at Harvard University's Pforzheimer House. Previously, he served as interim director of orchestras at UMass Amherst, stepping in for conductor Morihiko Nakahara while he was on leave, for one term. At UMass, Kondakçi led the graduate conducting program and conducted the two university orchestras. He has also guest lectured at the New England Conservatory and Longy School of Music.

=== Reconstruction of the 1889 version of Mahler's First Symphony ===
During his undergraduate studies in 2011, Kristo Kondakçi became involved in a special project to mark the centennial of composer Gustav Mahler's death. With oversight and guidance by New England Conservatory professor Katarina Markovic and conductor Hugh Wolff, Kondakçi reconstructed a performing edition of the earliest version of Mahler's Symphony No. 1, which was thought to be lost for over 100 years, based on two of the earliest manuscript sources for the symphony. The New England Conservatory Philharmonia performed this version in September 2011 under conductor Hugh Wolff to mark a semester long school festival around Mahler's music. The concert marked the American premiere of this earliest version of the first symphony, and the first time it has been heard in this form since its 1889 premiere.

=== Speaking and Coaching ===
Kristo Kondakçi maintains an active public speaking profile. In 2019, He gave a talk at the League of American Orchestras as a featured speaker on the "Orchestra as a Community Organization". Kondakçi also works closely with TEDxBoston and gave a TEDx talk in 2018. He engages in leadership development, having conducted workshops in Boston for corporate leaders and executives from across the Globe through the Leading Tone program.

== Personal life ==
Kristo Kondakçi resides in Boston, MA with his wife, Chloe Kondakçi. He has a younger brother, Gramoz Kondakçi, who is a scientist and researcher based in Cambridge, MA. His parents, Jolanda Omari and Dhimiter Kondakçi, also reside in Massachusetts.
