= Rally Estonia =

Rallying competition held in Estonia

- Status: active
- Genre: motorsporting event
- Date: July
- Frequency: annual
- Locations: Tartu, Otepää, Elva
- Country: Estonia
- Inaugurated: 2010
- Most recent: 2026
- Website: rallyestonia.com
- 2026 Rally Estonia

Rally Estonia is a rallying event organised each year in Estonia. It is the largest and most high-profile motorsport event in the country and the Baltic states. The rally runs on smooth gravel roads in the south of the country, some of which are purpose-built for the rally. The city of Tartu hosts the ceremonial start and finish, with the rally headquarters and service park usually based in the Estonian National Museum in Tartu. From 2014 to 2016, Rally Estonia was a round of the FIA European Rally Championship. Rally Estonia was the official WRC Promotional Rally in 2019 and joined the World Rally Championship calendar in 2020.

== History ==
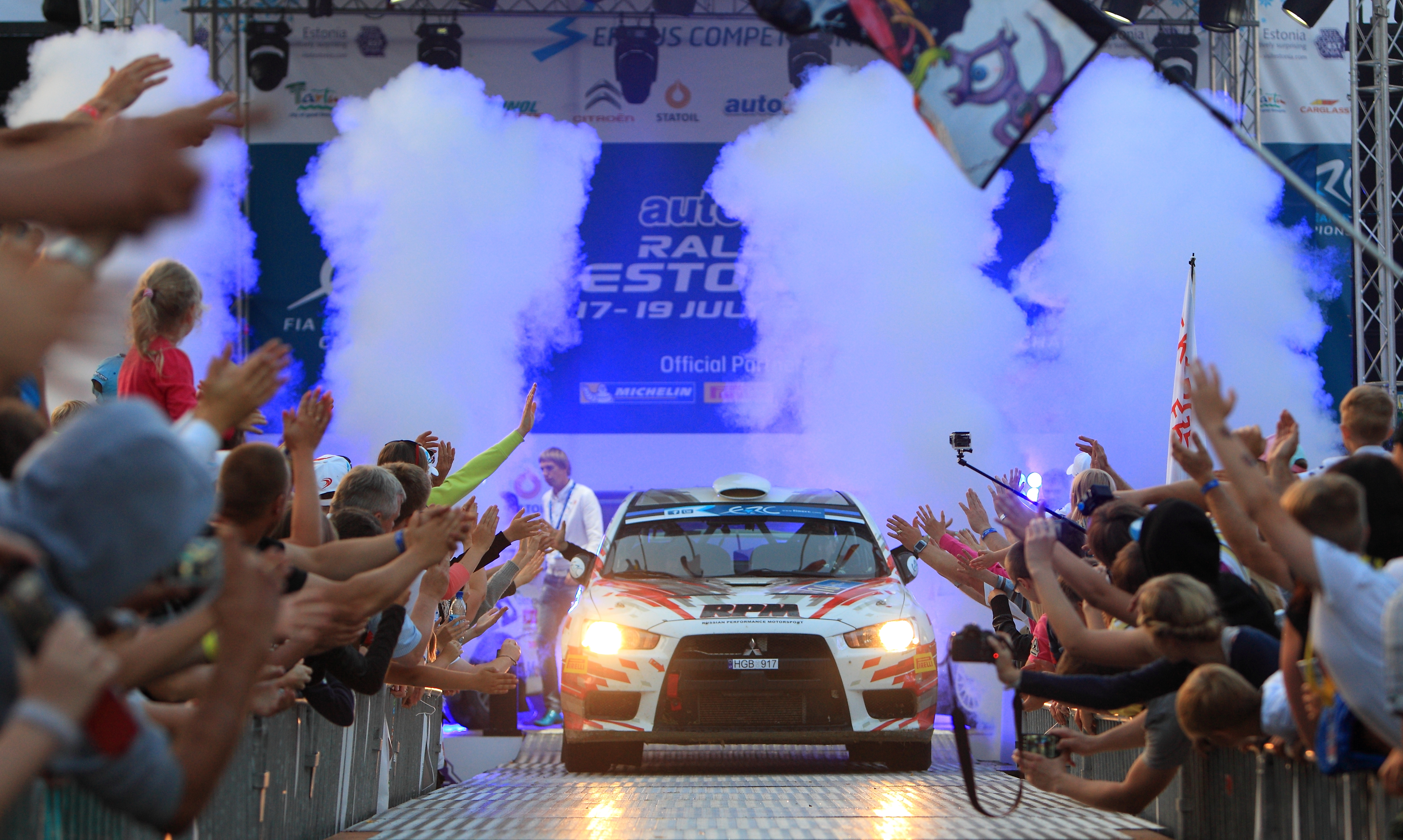
Alexey Lukyanuk (Mitsubishi Lancer Evo X) leaving the start podium on the 2014 rally.

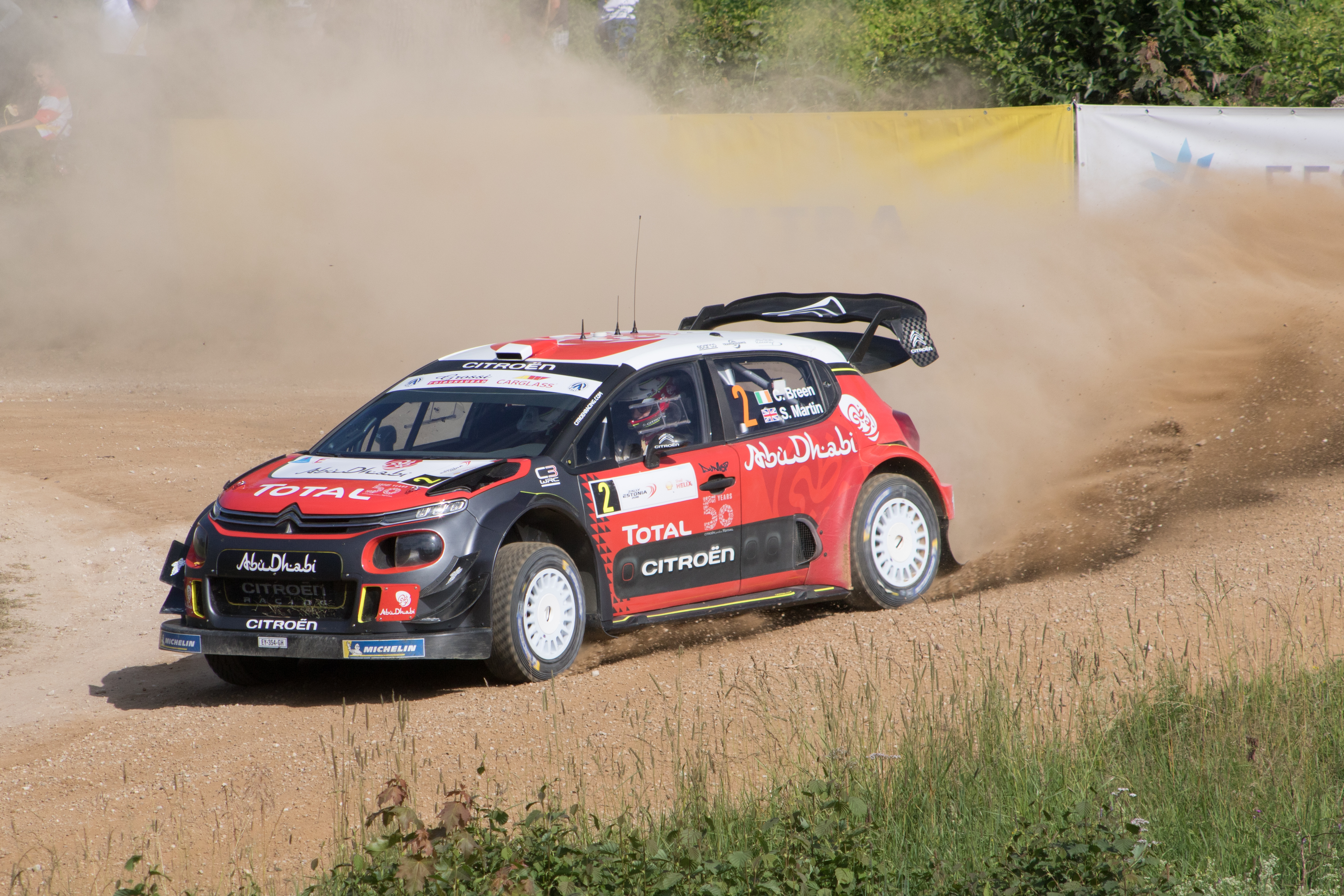
Craig Breen driving a Citroën C3 WRC on the 2018 rally.

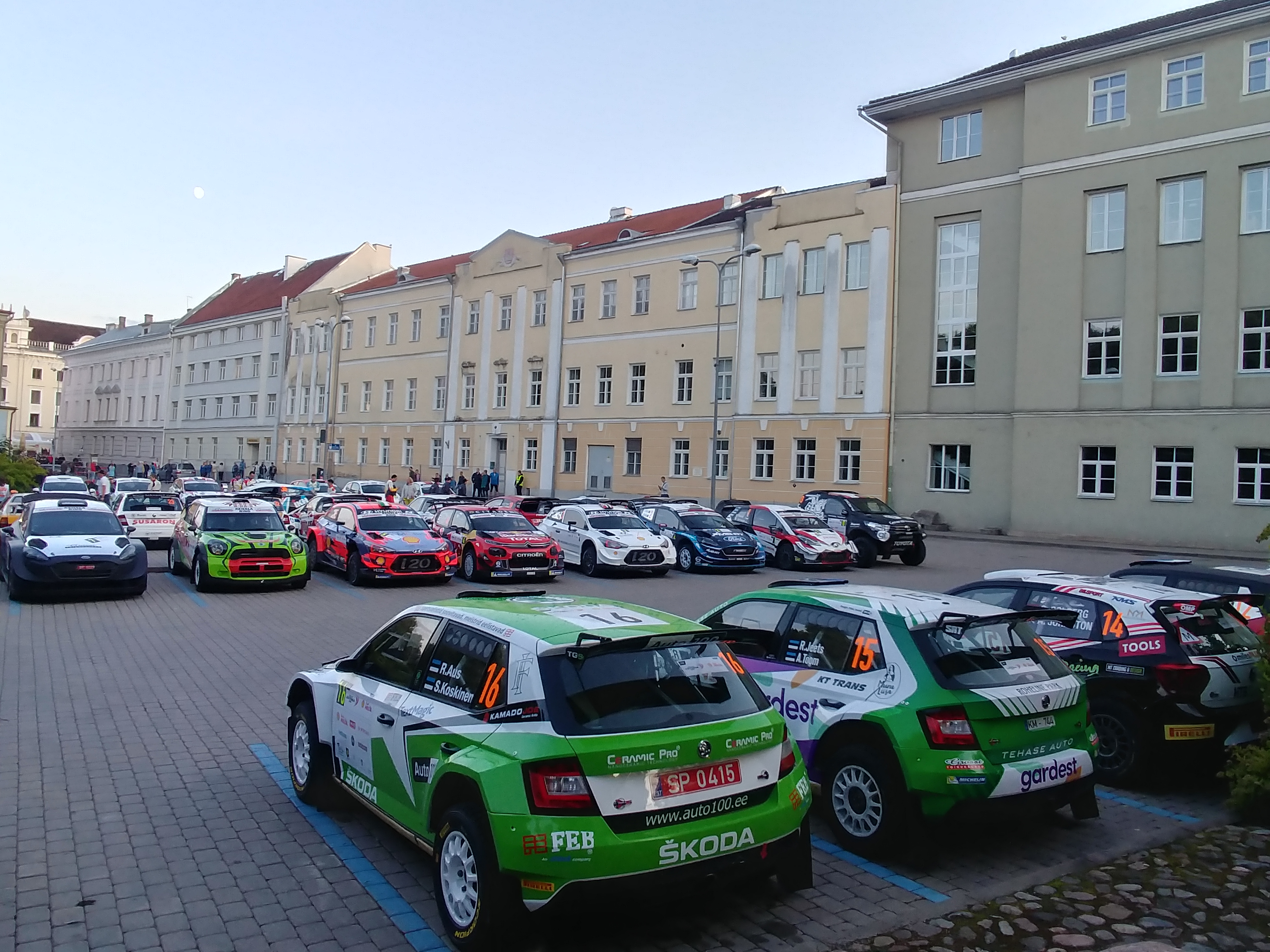
Rally cars in parc fermé on the 2019 rally at Tartu city centre.

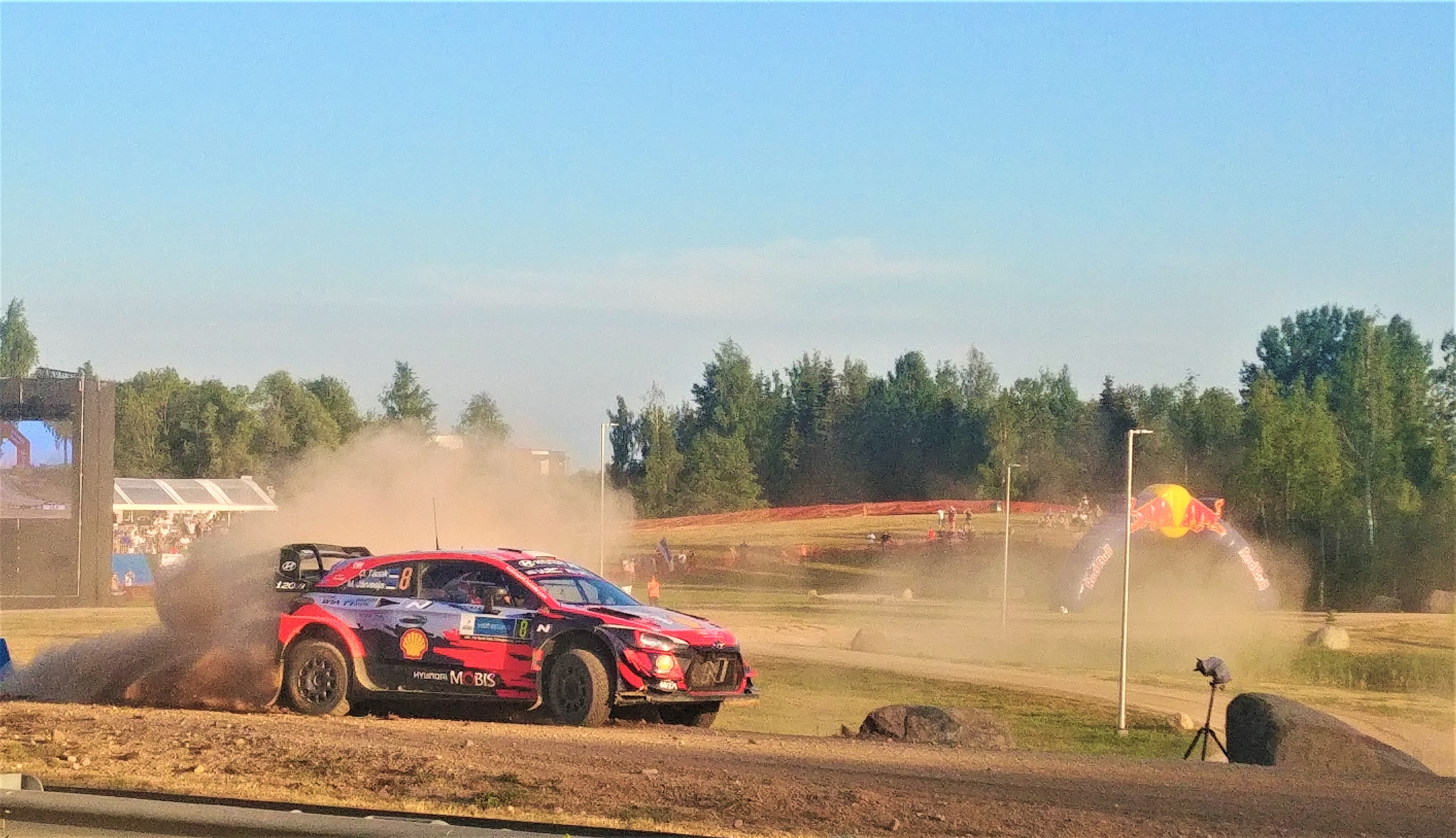
Ott Tänak driving a Hyundai i20 Coupe WRC on the 2021 rally.

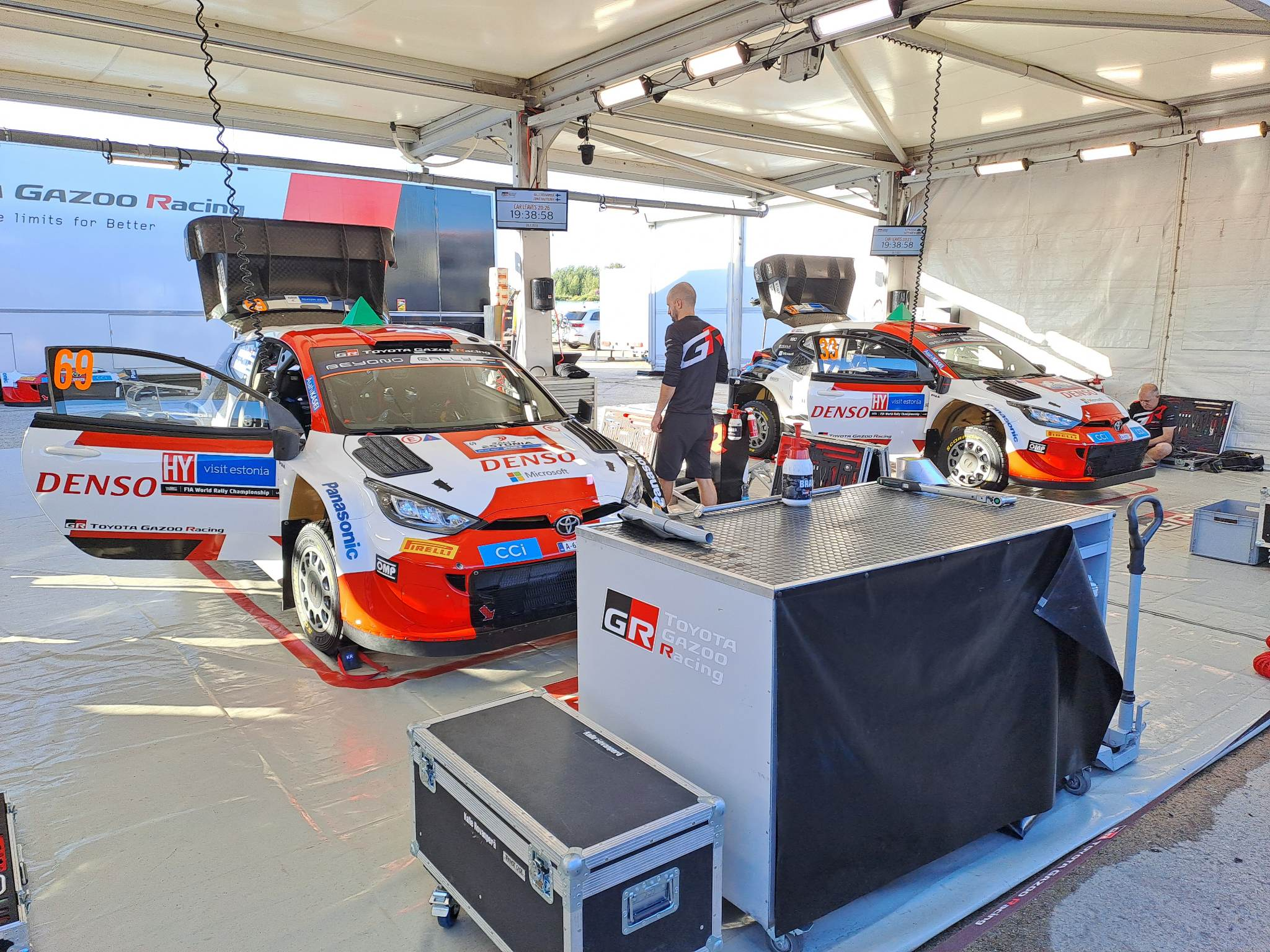
Toyota GR Yaris Rally1 cars in service park on the 2023 rally at the Estonian National Museum.

=== 2010–2013: Early years ===
The inaugural event, known as Mad-Croc Rally Estonia for sponsorship reasons, was held in 2010 as a part of the Estonian Rally Championship. It was won by Markko Märtin and Kristo Kraag who won all the special stages. In the following year, the rally became known as the auto24 Rally Estonia. Mads Østberg and Jonas Andersson took back-to-back wins in 2011 and 2012 driving a Ford Fiesta RS WRC thus becoming the first two-time winners of Rally Estonia. Local driver Georg Gross together with co-driver Raigo Mõlder won the rally in 2013 in a Ford Focus RS WRC 08.

=== 2014–2016, 2024: ERC event ===
In 2014 Rally Estonia became a round of the European Rally Championship. Ott Tänak and Raigo Mõlder won the rally driving a Ford Fiesta R5. The 2014 edition was awarded with the ERC Rally of the Year Award. In 2015 Aleksey Lukyanuk and Alexey Arnautov made history as they took the overall win driving a R4 spec (ERC-2 category) Mitsubishi Lancer Evo X against more powerful R5 spec Ford Fiesta driven by Kajetan Kajetanowicz and co-driver Jarosław Baran. In 2016 Lukyanuk and Arnautov were on the verge of defending their win, but crashed out from the lead on the penultimate stage, allowing Ralfs Sirmacis and Māris Kulšs to take victory in their Škoda Fabia R5.

Rally Estonia made a quick a return to ERC calendar when in February 2023 WRC Promoter announced that Rally Liepāja would step up from the European Rally Championship to hold a World Rally Championship event under new name, Rally Latvia in 2024 and it was subject to speculation that it would replace Rally Estonia on the calendar. The 2024 WRC calendar was revealed in October 2023 with Rally Latvia being the eighth round of the thirteen-round championship and Rally Estonia was dropped from the calendar. In November 2023, FIA unveiled the European Rally Championship calendar for the 2024 season, and after a seven-year break, Rally Estonia was included in the calendar as round four of the eight-round championship. The organizers also announced that Rally Estonia would be part of the WRC calendar again in 2025.

=== 2018–2019: WRC aspirations ===
The event was put on hiatus in 2017 and returned in 2018, when it became known as Shell Helix Rally Estonia for sponsorship reasons. The rally became a popular event with World Rally Championship works teams preparing for Rally Finland. The 2018 edition marked the first time the new Toyota Yaris WRC entered a competition outside the WRC series. Ott Tänak and Martin Järveoja won eleven stages out of sixteen and took a dominant victory, the second Rally Estonia win for Tänak. In 2019 the rally organisers signed an agreement with WRC Promoter and Rally Estonia became the first ever official WRC Promotional Event, and revealed ambitions to become part of the World Rally Championship from 2022. Every WRC manufacturer team entered the event, making Rally Estonia the largest rally outside the World Rally Championship. Ott Tänak and Martin Järveoja took another win in dominant style, winning all but two special stages. It was the third Rally Estonia win for Tänak and the second for co-driver Järveoja. The 2019 rally attracted more than 52,000 fans, a 25 per cent rise on 2018. More than 100 countries screened the event on television and it also proved a big hit on social media, with 25.8 million impressions and 2.7 million video views on WRC and event channels.

=== 2020–2023, 2025–present: WRC event ===
==== 2020 ====
The 2020 edition of the non-championship rally and the second as a WRC Promotional Rally was scheduled to slot into the 2020 WRC calendar a week after Kenya’s Safari Rally, round eight of the series, and two weeks ahead of the following fixture at Rally Finland. However, it was announced in February that the 2020 edition had been cancelled after the event organizers were unable to find agreement with the national governing body, the Estonian Autosport Union (EAU). Principal issue in the dispute was the competition registration fee, which the EAU raised 5,000 percent from €2,000 to €100,000 in January, just six months before the scheduled start of the rally in July. Paying that level of a fee was not possible, both legally and budget-wise, as stated by the organizers.

In March the spreading COVID-19 pandemic led to cancellation of six World Rally Championship rounds. Organizers of the championship announced that they were considering adding events to the schedule that had not been part of the original calendar. Estonia was among the countries who had expressed interest in hosting the event. On July 2, 2020, WRC Promoter announced that the season would return with an updated calendar with newcomers Rally Estonia hosting the resuming round between 4 and 6 September making Estonia the thirty-third nation to stage a championship round in the WRC.

The rally marked the return of the World Rally Championship after a half-year hiatus by the COVID-19 pandemic and was the 600th event since the championship was founded back to 1973. Winning the warm-up event, local favourites Tänak and Järveoja were determined to vanquish their home soil for the third straight year. The reigning world champions showed an impressive speed throughout the weekend, leading almost the entire rally to win their first victory for Hyundai in their motherland. Teammates Craig Breen and Paul Nagle finished second after a consistent performance to complete a Hyundai 1–2. The event was widely praised and considered by some of the FIA members as one of the best WRC events of all time. The 2020 edition was awarded with the WRC Team Spirit Award by successfully executing a COVID-safe maiden WRC event in just 63 days.

==== 2021 ====
After last years' success, Rally Estonia was included in the 2021 WRC calendar as round seven of the twelve-round championship. Ahead of home crowds, local favourites Tänak and Järveoja were keen to repeat their success one year ago. It wasn't long until they led the rally, but double puncture happened in two consecutive stages on Friday's morning loop put them from heroes to zeroes — They run out of spare wheel to change, meaning they could not go any further on Friday. Following Tänak and Järveoja's issue, Kalle Rovanperä and Jonne Halttunen put them in advantage for the victory contention. Having fended off the pursuit of Craig Breen and Paul Nagle, they increasingly extend their lead to the eventual shy off one minute to claim their maiden WRC win. At 20 years and 290 days, Rovanperä became the youngest driver to win a WRC event, breaking the previous record of 22 years and 313 days held by Jari-Matti Latvala. Breen and Nagle achieved their first podium of the season by finishing second, with teammates Thierry Neuville and Martijn Wydaeghe rounded out of the podium with their fifth third place of the season.

==== 2022 ====
The 2022 edition was scheduled as round seven of the thirteen-round championship. Rally Estonia marked the first high-speed gravel rally for the WRC's hybrid-powered Rally1 cars and turned out to be quite a spectacle. Twelve months ago Kalle Rovanperä became the WRC's youngest rally winner with victory in Estonia. This time the 21-year-old Finn finished the four-day gravel road fixture 1min 00.9sec clear of Toyota team-mate Elfyn Evans. Evans dominated initially but Rovanperä grabbed the lead in Friday's final rain-soaked speed test. After fine-tuning his car's set-up on Saturday morning, he reeled off seven consecutive fastest times to distance the Welshman and more than double his advantage. Rain again ensured slippery conditions in Sunday's closing leg but Rovanperä was in no mood to compromise. He won the final Power Stage by an astounding 22.4sec to gain maximum bonus points. Such was his dominance that he won 14 of the rally's 24 tests. Rovanperä and co-driver Jonne Halttunen continued their unstoppable form, when the Finnish crew claimed their fifth win in six rallies of the 2022 season. Home hero Ott Tänak completed the podium a further 54.8sec adrift in a Hyundai i20, with only a single stage win. He never looked like threatening those ahead as he wrestled handling problems but the four-time Estonia winner was more than good enough to finish best of the rest.

==== 2023 ====
Rally Estonia was part of the WRC calendar for the fourth consecutive year as the 2023 edition was scheduled as round eight of the thirteen-round championship. Ott Tänak and Martin Järveoja were the pre-event favourites but their hopes of a home victory were squashed before the rally had even started. Issues in Thursday's shakedown forced a last-minute engine change and landed them a five-minute penalty before the opening stage.

Kalle Rovanperä and Jonne Halttunen secured their third consecutive Rally Estonia triumph as the Finns finished the four-day gravel road fixture 52.7sec ahead of Hyundai's Thierry Neuville and Martijn Wydaeghe, who initially led after Friday's opening loop. Rovanperä seized the top spot later that day before reeling off nine consecutive fastest times on Saturday to exert his supremacy. Rovanperä also remained untouchable in Sunday's closing leg winning all four speed tests in his Toyota GR Yaris and gaining maximum Power Stage bonus points in the process. Such was his dominance that he won 15 of the rally's 21 special stages. Rovanperä and Halttunen posted 13 consecutive fastest times over the final two days. The last time similar kind of domination was seen in WRC was in 2005 when Sébastien Loeb and Daniel Elena won all 12 stages of 2005 Tour de Corse.

==== 2025 ====
In 2025, Rally Estonia returned to the WRC calendar. Tänak and Rovanperä were the favourites going to the rally, but as soon as the rally started, it was clear that Oliver Solberg will intervene to the fight for the victory. Solberg fininshed Friday in first place, ahead of Tänak by 12.4 seconds. Everybody expected that Tänak will take the lead by Saturday evening, but a mistake from Tänak in the first stage of Saturday widened the gap with Solberg. Solberg was then elusive, and Tänak started to battle hard with Neuville, changing their positions repeatedly. However, Tänak managed to take second place at the end of Saturday, leaving Neuville third. The battle was meant to continue on Sunday, but a false start from Neuville gave him a 10 second penalty. Oliver Solberg won the rally and took his first ever victory in WRC.

== Winners ==
Season	Driver	Co-driver	Entrant	Car	Tyre	Event report	Championship
2010	(Estonia) Markko Märtin	(Estonia) Kristo Kraag	(Estonia) MM Motorsport	Ford Focus RS WRC 03	BF	Report	
2011	(Norway) Mads Østberg	(Sweden) Jonas Andersson	(Norway) Adapta AS	Ford Fiesta RS WRC	BF	Report	
2012	(Norway) Mads Østberg	(Sweden) Jonas Andersson	(Norway) Adapta World Rally Team	Ford Fiesta RS WRC	M	Report	
2013	(Estonia) Georg Gross	(Estonia) Raigo Mõlder	(Estonia) OT Racing	Ford Focus RS WRC 08	P	Report	
2014	(Estonia) Ott Tänak	(Estonia) Raigo Mõlder	(Estonia) MM Motorsport	Ford Fiesta R5	D	Report	ERC
2015	(Russia) Alexey Lukyanuk	(Russia) Alexey Arnautov	(Ukraine) Chervonenko Racing	Mitsubishi Lancer Evo X	P	Report	ERC
2016	(Latvia) Ralfs Sirmacis	(Latvia) Māris Kulšs	(Latvia) Sports Racing Technologies	Škoda Fabia R5	M	Report	ERC
2017	Not held						
2018	(Estonia) Ott Tänak	(Estonia) Martin Järveoja	(Japan) Toyota Gazoo Racing WRT	Toyota Yaris WRC	M	Report	
2019	(Estonia) Ott Tänak	(Estonia) Martin Järveoja	(Japan) Toyota Gazoo Racing WRT	Toyota Yaris WRC	M	Report	
2020	(Estonia) Ott Tänak	(Estonia) Martin Järveoja	(South Korea) Hyundai Shell Mobis WRT	Hyundai i20 Coupe WRC	M	Report	WRC
2021	(Finland) Kalle Rovanperä	(Finland) Jonne Halttunen	(Japan) Toyota Gazoo Racing WRT	Toyota Yaris WRC	P	Report	WRC
2022	(Finland) Kalle Rovanperä	(Finland) Jonne Halttunen	(Japan) Toyota Gazoo Racing WRT	Toyota GR Yaris Rally1	P	Report	WRC
2023	(Finland) Kalle Rovanperä	(Finland) Jonne Halttunen	(Japan) Toyota Gazoo Racing WRT	Toyota GR Yaris Rally1	P	Report	WRC
2024	(Estonia) Georg Linnamäe	(United Kingdom) James Morgan	(Estonia) RedGrey Team	Toyota GR Yaris Rally2	M	Report	ERC
2025	(Sweden) Oliver Solberg	(United Kingdom) Elliott Edmondson	(Japan) Toyota Gazoo Racing WRT	Toyota GR Yaris Rally1	H	Report	WRC
2026	(Finland) Sami Pajari	(Finland) Marko Salminen	(Japan) Toyota Gazoo Racing WRT2	Toyota GR Yaris Rally1	H	Report	WRC
2027						Report	WRC

=== Multiple winners ===
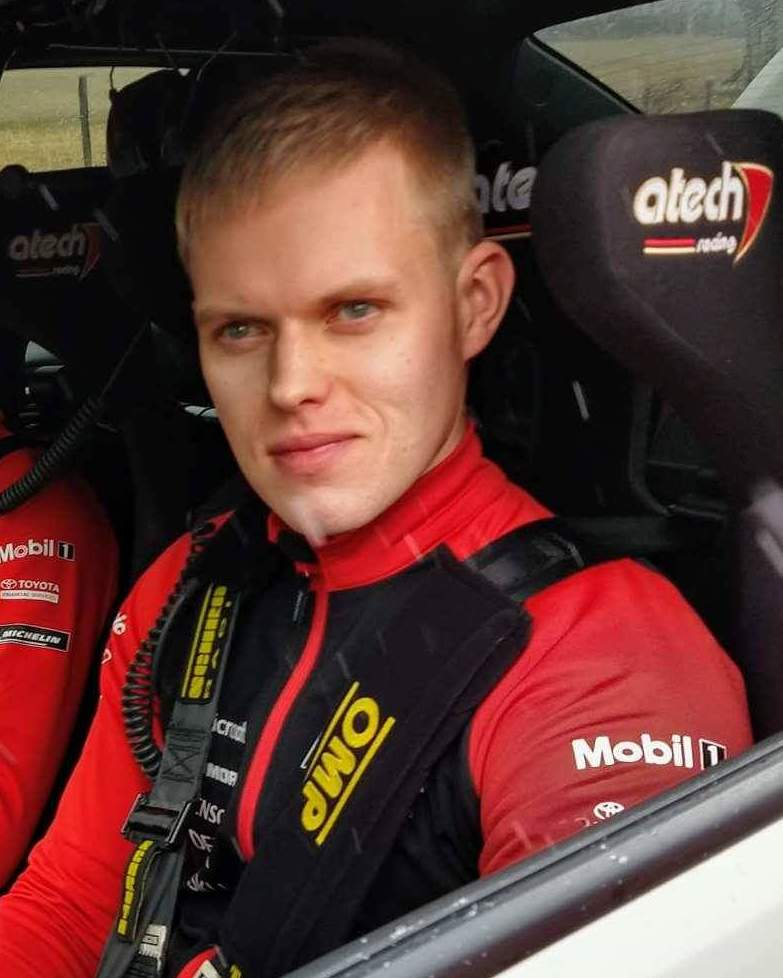
World champion Ott Tänak has won Rally Estonia four times.

- Years in **bold** mark WRC event
- Years in italic mark ERC event

Wins	Driver	Years won
4	(Estonia) Ott Tänak	2014, 2018, 2019, **2020**
3	(Finland) Kalle Rovanperä	**2021**, **2022**, **2023**
2	(Norway) Mads Østberg	2011, 2012

Wins	Co-driver	Years won
3	(Estonia) Martin Järveoja	2018, 2019, **2020**
3	(Finland) Jonne Halttunen	**2021**, **2022**, **2023**
2	(Sweden) Jonas Andersson	2011, 2012
2	(Estonia) Raigo Mõlder	2013, 2014

Wins	Manufacturer
8	(Japan) Toyota
5	(United States) Ford

== Detailed results ==
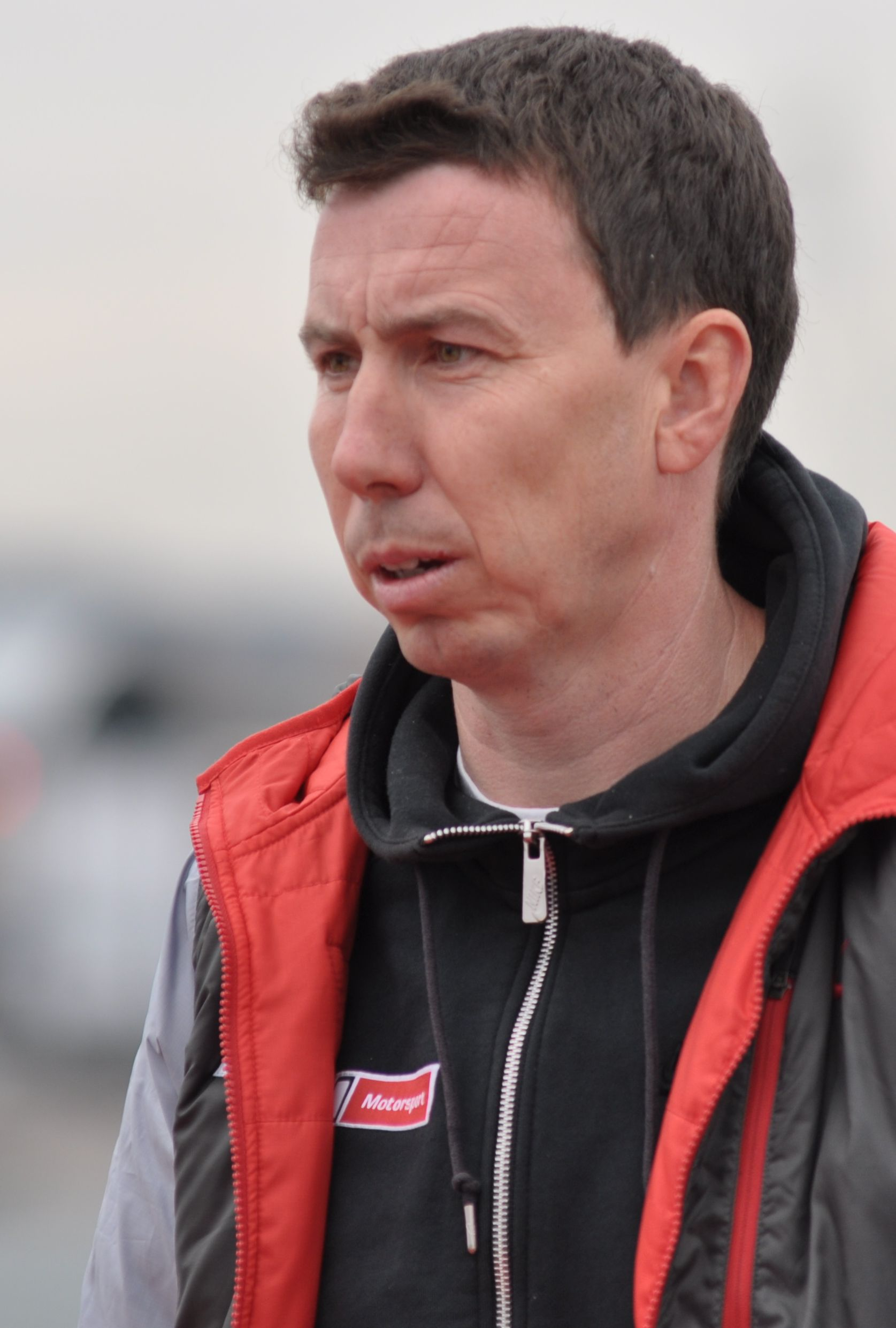
Markko Märtin won the inaugural event in 2010.

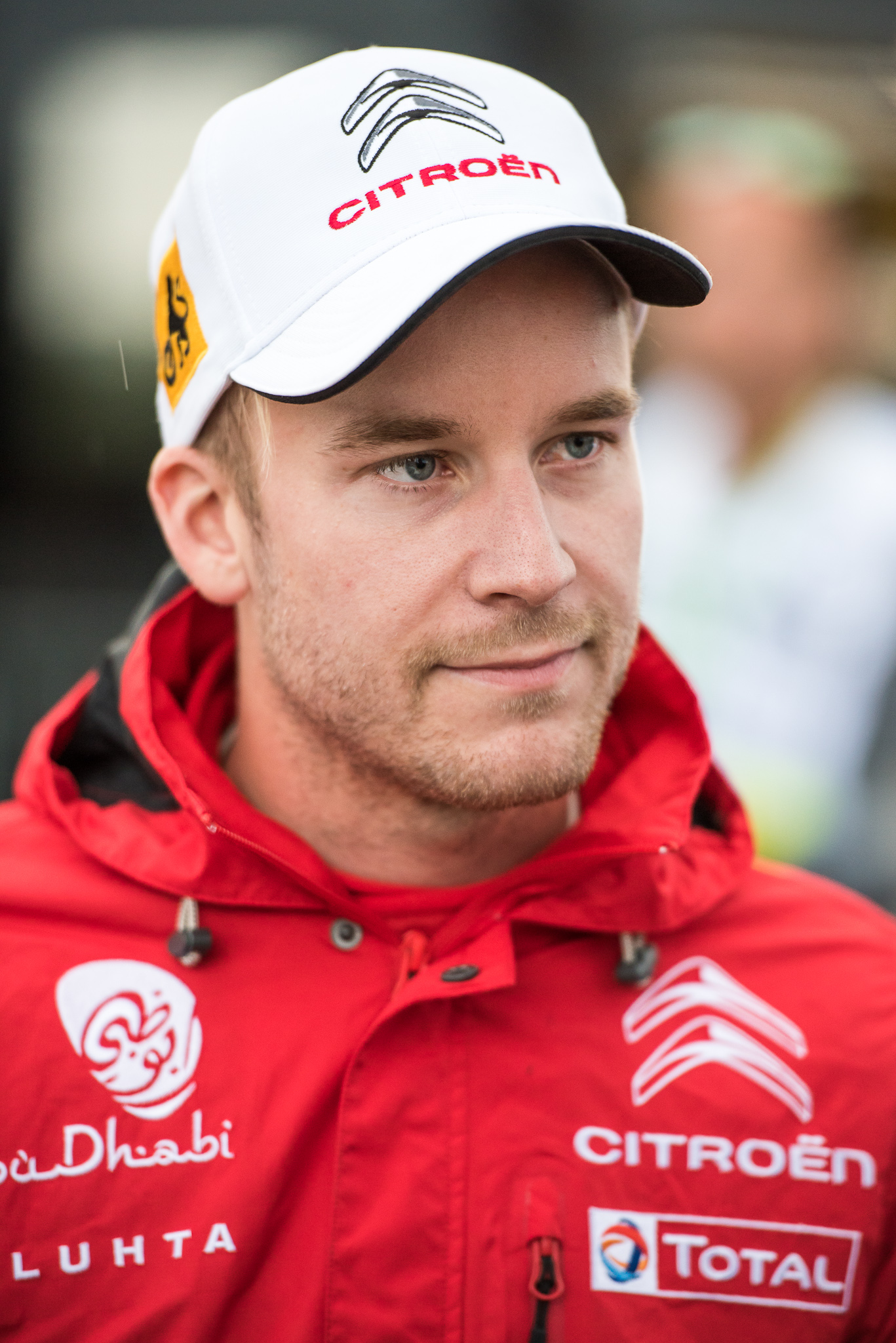
Mads Østberg is a two-time winner of Rally Estonia.

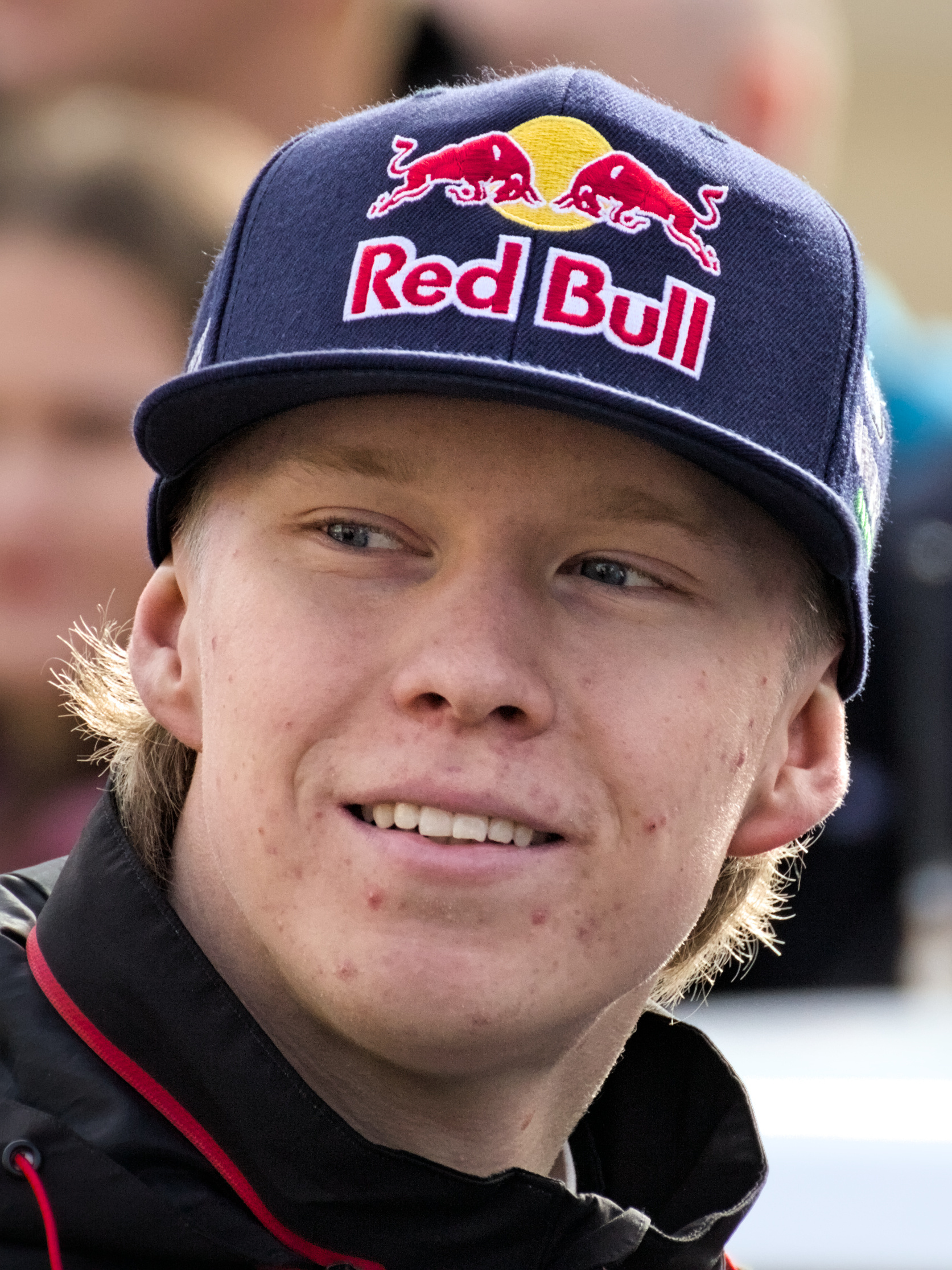
Double world champion Kalle Rovanperä has won Rally Estonia on three consecutive events.

Rally name	Podium finishers					Statistics			
Rally name	Pos.	No.	Crew	Entrant	Time	Stages	Length	Starters	Finishers
1. Mad-Croc Rally Estonia 2010; 16 – 18 July 2010; Round 3 of the 2010 Estonian Rally Championship	1	1	(Estonia) Markko Märtin (Estonia) Kristo Kraag	(Estonia) MM Motorsport (Ford Focus RS WRC 03)	1:33:19.1	12	189.83 km	115	62
1. Mad-Croc Rally Estonia 2010; 16 – 18 July 2010; Round 3 of the 2010 Estonian Rally Championship	2	6	(Estonia) Ott Tänak (Estonia) Kuldar Sikk	(Estonia) MM Motorsport (Subaru Impreza STi N14)	1:36:09.4	12	189.83 km	115	62
1. Mad-Croc Rally Estonia 2010; 16 – 18 July 2010; Round 3 of the 2010 Estonian Rally Championship	3	5	(Finland) Toni Gardemeister (Finland) Tapio Suominen	(Finland) GPOWER Ky (Ford Fiesta S2000)	1:37:32.5	12	189.83 km	115	62
2. auto24 Rally Estonia 2011; 15 – 16 July 2011; Round 4 of the 2011 Estonian Rally Championship	1	1	(Norway) Mads Østberg (Sweden) Jonas Andersson	(Norway) Adapta AS (Ford Fiesta RS WRC)	1:15:19.9	9	162.20 km	125	74
2. auto24 Rally Estonia 2011; 15 – 16 July 2011; Round 4 of the 2011 Estonian Rally Championship	2	6	(Estonia) Markko Märtin (Estonia) Kristo Kraag	(Estonia) MM Motorsport (Ford Focus RS WRC 03)	1:15:43.9	9	162.20 km	125	74
2. auto24 Rally Estonia 2011; 15 – 16 July 2011; Round 4 of the 2011 Estonian Rally Championship	3	2	(Czech Republic) Martin Prokop (Czech Republic) Michal Ernst	(Czech Republic) Czech Ford National Team (Ford Fiesta S2000)	1:18:57.4	9	162.20 km	125	74
3. auto24 Rally Estonia 2012; 20 – 21 July 2012; Round 3 of the 2012 Estonian Rally Championship; Round 5 of the 2012 Latvian Rally Championship	1	1	(Norway) Mads Østberg (Sweden) Jonas Andersson	(Norway) Adapta World Rally Team (Ford Fiesta RS WRC)	1:20:20.8	12	167.76 km	121	67
3. auto24 Rally Estonia 2012; 20 – 21 July 2012; Round 3 of the 2012 Estonian Rally Championship; Round 5 of the 2012 Latvian Rally Championship	2	2	(Belgium) Thierry Neuville (Belgium) Nicolas Gilsoul	(France) Citroën Junior WRT (Citroën DS3 WRC)	1:20:47.3	12	167.76 km	121	67
3. auto24 Rally Estonia 2012; 20 – 21 July 2012; Round 3 of the 2012 Estonian Rally Championship; Round 5 of the 2012 Latvian Rally Championship	3	3	(Estonia) Georg Gross (Estonia) Raigo Mõlder	(Estonia) MM Motorsport (Ford Focus RS WRC 08)	1:22:05.7	12	167.76 km	121	67
4. auto24 Rally Estonia 2013; 19 – 20 July 2013; Round 4 of the 2013 Estonian Rally Championship; Round 5 of the 2013 Latvian Rally Championship	1	1	(Estonia) Georg Gross (Estonia) Raigo Mõlder	(Estonia) OT Racing (Ford Focus RS WRC 08)	1:07:55.9	9	143.26 km	130	67
4. auto24 Rally Estonia 2013; 19 – 20 July 2013; Round 4 of the 2013 Estonian Rally Championship; Round 5 of the 2013 Latvian Rally Championship	2	5	(Estonia) Karl Kruuda (Estonia) Martin Järveoja	(Estonia) MM Motorsport (Ford Fiesta R5)	1:08:35.2	9	143.26 km	130	67
4. auto24 Rally Estonia 2013; 19 – 20 July 2013; Round 4 of the 2013 Estonian Rally Championship; Round 5 of the 2013 Latvian Rally Championship	3	3	(Russia) Alexey Lukyanuk (Russia) Alexey Arnautov	(Latvia) Autostils Rally Technica (Mitsubishi Lancer Evo IX)	1:08:37.6	9	143.26 km	130	67
5. auto24 Rally Estonia 2014; 17 – 19 July 2014; Round 7 of the 2014 European Rally Championship; Round 5 of the 2014 Estonian Rally Championship	1	1	(Estonia) Ott Tänak (Estonia) Raigo Mõlder	(Estonia) MM Motorsport (Ford Fiesta R5)	1:49:36.4	15	231.55 km	61	30
5. auto24 Rally Estonia 2014; 17 – 19 July 2014; Round 7 of the 2014 European Rally Championship; Round 5 of the 2014 Estonian Rally Championship	2	16	(Russia) Alexey Lukyanuk (Russia) Alexey Arnautov	(Lithuania) EAMV (Mitsubishi Lancer Evo X)	1:50:23.5	15	231.55 km	61	30
5. auto24 Rally Estonia 2014; 17 – 19 July 2014; Round 7 of the 2014 European Rally Championship; Round 5 of the 2014 Estonian Rally Championship	3	9	(Estonia) Timmu Kõrge (Estonia) Erki Pints	(Estonia) MM Motorsport (Ford Fiesta R5)	1:50:31.8	15	231.55 km	61	30
6. auto24 Rally Estonia 2015; 17 – 19 July 2015; Round 6 of the 2015 European Rally Championship	1	15	(Russia) Alexey Lukyanuk (Russia) Alexey Arnautov	(Ukraine) Chervonenko Racing (Mitsubishi Lancer Evo X)	1:32:25.4	16	202.86 km	56	35
6. auto24 Rally Estonia 2015; 17 – 19 July 2015; Round 6 of the 2015 European Rally Championship	2	16	(Poland) Kajetan Kajetanowicz (Poland) Jarosław Baran	(Poland) Lotos Rally Team (Ford Fiesta R5)	1:32:38.1	16	202.86 km	56	35
6. auto24 Rally Estonia 2015; 17 – 19 July 2015; Round 6 of the 2015 European Rally Championship	3	17	(Estonia) Rainer Aus (Estonia) Simo Koskinen	(Estonia) LEDrent Rally Team (Mitsubishi Lancer Evo IX)	1:33:32.4	16	202.86 km	56	35
7. auto24 Rally Estonia 2016; 15 – 17 July 2016; Round 6 of the 2016 European Rally Championship	1	3	(Latvia) Ralfs Sirmacis (Latvia) Māris Kulšs	(Latvia) Sports Racing Technologies (Škoda Fabia R5)	1:44:16.2	16	211.45 km	40	28
7. auto24 Rally Estonia 2016; 15 – 17 July 2016; Round 6 of the 2016 European Rally Championship	2	1	(Poland) Kajetan Kajetanowicz (Poland) Jarosław Baran	(Poland) Lotos Rally Team (Ford Fiesta R5)	1:45:50.7	16	211.45 km	40	28
7. auto24 Rally Estonia 2016; 15 – 17 July 2016; Round 6 of the 2016 European Rally Championship	3	15	(Estonia) Rainer Aus (Estonia) Simo Koskinen	(Estonia) ALM Motorsport (Mitsubishi Lancer Evo IX)	1:48:01.0	16	211.45 km	40	28
2017 rally not held
8. Shell Helix Rally Estonia 2018; 13 – 15 July 2018; Round 5 of the 2018 Estonian Rally Championship; Round 4 of the 2018 Latvian Rally Championship	1	1	(Estonia) Ott Tänak (Estonia) Martin Järveoja	(Japan) Toyota Gazoo Racing WRT (Toyota Yaris WRC)	1:12:31.9	16	146.40 km	104	52
8. Shell Helix Rally Estonia 2018; 13 – 15 July 2018; Round 5 of the 2018 Estonian Rally Championship; Round 4 of the 2018 Latvian Rally Championship	2	3	(New Zealand) Hayden Paddon (United Kingdom) Sebastian Marshall	(South Korea) Hyundai Motorsport (Hyundai i20 Coupe WRC)	1:13:31.0	16	146.40 km	104	52
8. Shell Helix Rally Estonia 2018; 13 – 15 July 2018; Round 5 of the 2018 Estonian Rally Championship; Round 4 of the 2018 Latvian Rally Championship	3	2	(Republic of Ireland) Craig Breen (United Kingdom) Scott Martin	(France) Citroën Total Abu Dhabi WRT (Citroën C3 WRC)	1:15:44.3	16	146.40 km	104	52
9. Shell Helix Rally Estonia 2019; 12 – 14 July 2019; Round 5 of the 2019 Estonian Rally Championship; Round 5 of the 2019 Latvian Rally Championship	1	1	(Estonia) Ott Tänak (Estonia) Martin Järveoja	(Japan) Toyota Gazoo Racing WRT (Toyota Yaris WRC)	1:15:38.4	15	151.98 km	105	67
9. Shell Helix Rally Estonia 2019; 12 – 14 July 2019; Round 5 of the 2019 Estonian Rally Championship; Round 5 of the 2019 Latvian Rally Championship	2	3	(Norway) Andreas Mikkelsen (Norway) Anders Jæger-Amland	(South Korea) Hyundai Motorsport N (Hyundai i20 Coupe WRC)	1:16:41.9	15	151.98 km	105	67
9. Shell Helix Rally Estonia 2019; 12 – 14 July 2019; Round 5 of the 2019 Estonian Rally Championship; Round 5 of the 2019 Latvian Rally Championship	3	4	(Finland) Esapekka Lappi (Finland) Janne Ferm	(France) Citroën Total WRT (Citroën C3 WRC)	1:17:05.5	15	151.98 km	105	67
10. Rally Estonia 2020; 4 – 6 September 2020; Round 4 of the 2020 World Rally Championship; Round 2 of the 2020 Junior WRC Championship	1	8	(Estonia) Ott Tänak (Estonia) Martin Järveoja	(South Korea) Hyundai Shell Mobis WRT (Hyundai i20 Coupe WRC)	1:59:53.6	17	232.64 km	59	44
10. Rally Estonia 2020; 4 – 6 September 2020; Round 4 of the 2020 World Rally Championship; Round 2 of the 2020 Junior WRC Championship	2	42	(Republic of Ireland) Craig Breen (Republic of Ireland) Paul Nagle	(South Korea) Hyundai Shell Mobis WRT (Hyundai i20 Coupe WRC)	2:00:15.8	17	232.64 km	59	44
10. Rally Estonia 2020; 4 – 6 September 2020; Round 4 of the 2020 World Rally Championship; Round 2 of the 2020 Junior WRC Championship	3	17	(France) Sébastien Ogier (France) Julien Ingrassia	(Japan) Toyota Gazoo Racing WRT (Toyota Yaris WRC)	2:00:20.5	17	232.64 km	59	44
11. Rally Estonia 2021; 15 – 18 July 2021; Round 7 of the 2021 World Rally Championship; Round 3 of the 2021 Junior WRC Championship	1	69	(Finland) Kalle Rovanperä (Finland) Jonne Halttunen	(Japan) Toyota Gazoo Racing WRT (Toyota Yaris WRC)	2:51:29.1	24	319.38 km	49	38
11. Rally Estonia 2021; 15 – 18 July 2021; Round 7 of the 2021 World Rally Championship; Round 3 of the 2021 Junior WRC Championship	2	42	(Republic of Ireland) Craig Breen (Republic of Ireland) Paul Nagle	(South Korea) Hyundai Shell Mobis WRT (Hyundai i20 Coupe WRC)	2:52:29.0	24	319.38 km	49	38
11. Rally Estonia 2021; 15 – 18 July 2021; Round 7 of the 2021 World Rally Championship; Round 3 of the 2021 Junior WRC Championship	3	11	(Belgium) Thierry Neuville (Belgium) Martijn Wydaeghe	(South Korea) Hyundai Shell Mobis WRT (Hyundai i20 Coupe WRC)	2:52:41.5	24	319.38 km	49	38
12. Rally Estonia 2022; 14 – 17 July 2022; Round 7 of the 2022 World Rally Championship; Round 4 of the 2022 Estonian Rally Championship	1	69	(Finland) Kalle Rovanperä (Finland) Jonne Halttunen	(Japan) Toyota Gazoo Racing WRT (Toyota GR Yaris Rally1)	2:54:29.0	24	313.84 km	42	33
12. Rally Estonia 2022; 14 – 17 July 2022; Round 7 of the 2022 World Rally Championship; Round 4 of the 2022 Estonian Rally Championship	2	33	(United Kingdom) Elfyn Evans (United Kingdom) Scott Martin	(Japan) Toyota Gazoo Racing WRT (Toyota GR Yaris Rally1)	2:55:29.9	24	313.84 km	42	33
12. Rally Estonia 2022; 14 – 17 July 2022; Round 7 of the 2022 World Rally Championship; Round 4 of the 2022 Estonian Rally Championship	3	8	(Estonia) Ott Tänak (Estonia) Martin Järveoja	(South Korea) Hyundai Shell Mobis WRT (Hyundai i20 N Rally1)	2:56:24.7	24	313.84 km	42	33
13. Rally Estonia 2023; 20 – 23 July 2023; Round 8 of the 2023 World Rally Championship; Round 5 of the 2023 Junior WRC Championship; Round 4 of the 2023 Estonian Rally Championship	1	69	(Finland) Kalle Rovanperä (Finland) Jonne Halttunen	(Japan) Toyota Gazoo Racing WRT (Toyota GR Yaris Rally1)	2:36:03.2	21	300.70 km	50	44
13. Rally Estonia 2023; 20 – 23 July 2023; Round 8 of the 2023 World Rally Championship; Round 5 of the 2023 Junior WRC Championship; Round 4 of the 2023 Estonian Rally Championship	2	11	(Belgium) Thierry Neuville (Belgium) Martijn Wydaeghe	(South Korea) Hyundai Shell Mobis WRT (Hyundai i20 N Rally1)	2:36:55.8	21	300.70 km	50	44
13. Rally Estonia 2023; 20 – 23 July 2023; Round 8 of the 2023 World Rally Championship; Round 5 of the 2023 Junior WRC Championship; Round 4 of the 2023 Estonian Rally Championship	3	4	(Finland) Esapekka Lappi (Finland) Janne Ferm	(South Korea) Hyundai Shell Mobis WRT (Hyundai i20 N Rally1)	2:37:02.7	21	300.70 km	50	44
14. Delfi Rally Estonia 2024; 5 – 7 July 2024; Round 4 of the 2024 European Rally Championship; Round 4 of the 2024 Estonian Rally Championship; Round 3 of the 2024 Latvian Rally Championship	1	12	(Estonia) Georg Linnamäe (United Kingdom) James Morgan	(Estonia) RedGrey Team (Toyota GR Yaris Rally2)	1:44:33.1	14	187.79 km	51	42
14. Delfi Rally Estonia 2024; 5 – 7 July 2024; Round 4 of the 2024 European Rally Championship; Round 4 of the 2024 Estonian Rally Championship; Round 3 of the 2024 Latvian Rally Championship	2	15	(Estonia) Robert Virves (United Kingdom) Craig Drew	(Estonia) Robert Virves (Škoda Fabia RS Rally2)	1:44:35.3	14	187.79 km	51	42
14. Delfi Rally Estonia 2024; 5 – 7 July 2024; Round 4 of the 2024 European Rally Championship; Round 4 of the 2024 Estonian Rally Championship; Round 3 of the 2024 Latvian Rally Championship	3	14	(Bulgaria) Nikolay Gryazin (Latvia) Andris Mālnieks	(Estonia) SC - 911 Team (Citroën C3 Rally2)	1:45:44.3	14	187.79 km	51	42
15. Delfi Rally Estonia 2025; 17 – 20 July 2025; Round 8 of the 2025 World Rally Championship	1	99	(Sweden) Oliver Solberg (United Kingdom) Elliott Edmondson	(Japan) Toyota Gazoo Racing WRT (Toyota GR Yaris Rally1)	2:36:35.1	20	308.35 km	37	30
15. Delfi Rally Estonia 2025; 17 – 20 July 2025; Round 8 of the 2025 World Rally Championship	2	8	(Estonia) Ott Tänak (Estonia) Martin Järveoja	(South Korea) Hyundai Shell Mobis WRT (Hyundai i20 N Rally1)	2:37:00.3	20	308.35 km	37	30
15. Delfi Rally Estonia 2025; 17 – 20 July 2025; Round 8 of the 2025 World Rally Championship	3	1	(Belgium) Thierry Neuville (Belgium) Martijn Wydaeghe	(South Korea) Hyundai Shell Mobis WRT (Hyundai i20 N Rally1)	2:37:23.4	20	308.35 km	37	30
16. Delfi Rally Estonia 2026; 17 – 19 July 2026; Round 9 of the 2026 World Rally Championship	1	5	(Finland) Sami Pajari (Finland) Marko Salminen	(Japan) Toyota Gazoo Racing WRT2 (Toyota GR Yaris Rally1)	2:31:16.5	18	301.80 km	50	46
16. Delfi Rally Estonia 2026; 17 – 19 July 2026; Round 9 of the 2026 World Rally Championship	2	99	(Sweden) Oliver Solberg (United Kingdom) Elliott Edmondson	(Japan) Toyota Gazoo Racing WRT (Toyota GR Yaris Rally1)	2:31:36.0	18	301.80 km	50	46
16. Delfi Rally Estonia 2026; 17 – 19 July 2026; Round 9 of the 2026 World Rally Championship	3	16	(France) Adrien Fourmaux (France) Alexandre Coria	(South Korea) Hyundai Shell Mobis WRT (Hyundai i20 N Rally1)	2:32:10.3	18	301.80 km	50	46
17. Delfi Rally Estonia 2027; 22 – 25 July 2027; Round 9 of the 2027 World Rally Championship	1								
17. Delfi Rally Estonia 2027; 22 – 25 July 2027; Round 9 of the 2027 World Rally Championship	2								
17. Delfi Rally Estonia 2027; 22 – 25 July 2027; Round 9 of the 2027 World Rally Championship	3								

== Accolades ==
- 2014 ERC Rally of the Year
- 2014 Tartu Sports Event of the Year
- 2020 Tartu Deed of the Year
- 2020 WRC Asahi Kasei Team Spirit Award
- 2022 FIA 3 star rating in Environmental accreditation
