= Orkestra Melayu Singapura =

- Orchestra
- Native name: Orkestra Melayu Singapura
- Short name: OMS
- Founded: September 1991
- Location: Wisma Geylang Serai, Singapore
- Principal conductor: Jais Minsawi
- Music director: Amri Amin
- Website: Official website

The Orkestra Melayu Singapura is an orchestra based in Singapore which specialises in promoting and preserving traditional Malay Music. It was founded in 1991 and performs on both western instruments and traditional Malay instruments.

== Background ==
The orchestra was established in September 1991 by the People's Association at a cost of $35,000, sponsored by Mohd Mokhtar Abdullah. As of January 1992, there were 22 musicians, ranging from the age of 15 and 54, in the orchestra . It also has a gamelan ensemble, founded in 2001, and an associated youth orchestra.

== Music director since January 2009 ==
- Amri Amin

== Conductors ==
- Mokhtar Abdullah (conductor emeritus 1991 to 1995)
- Jais Minsawi (conductor since 1995)
- Benjamin Zander (guest conductor, August 2000)
