= Michael Zander =

English legal scholar (born 1932)

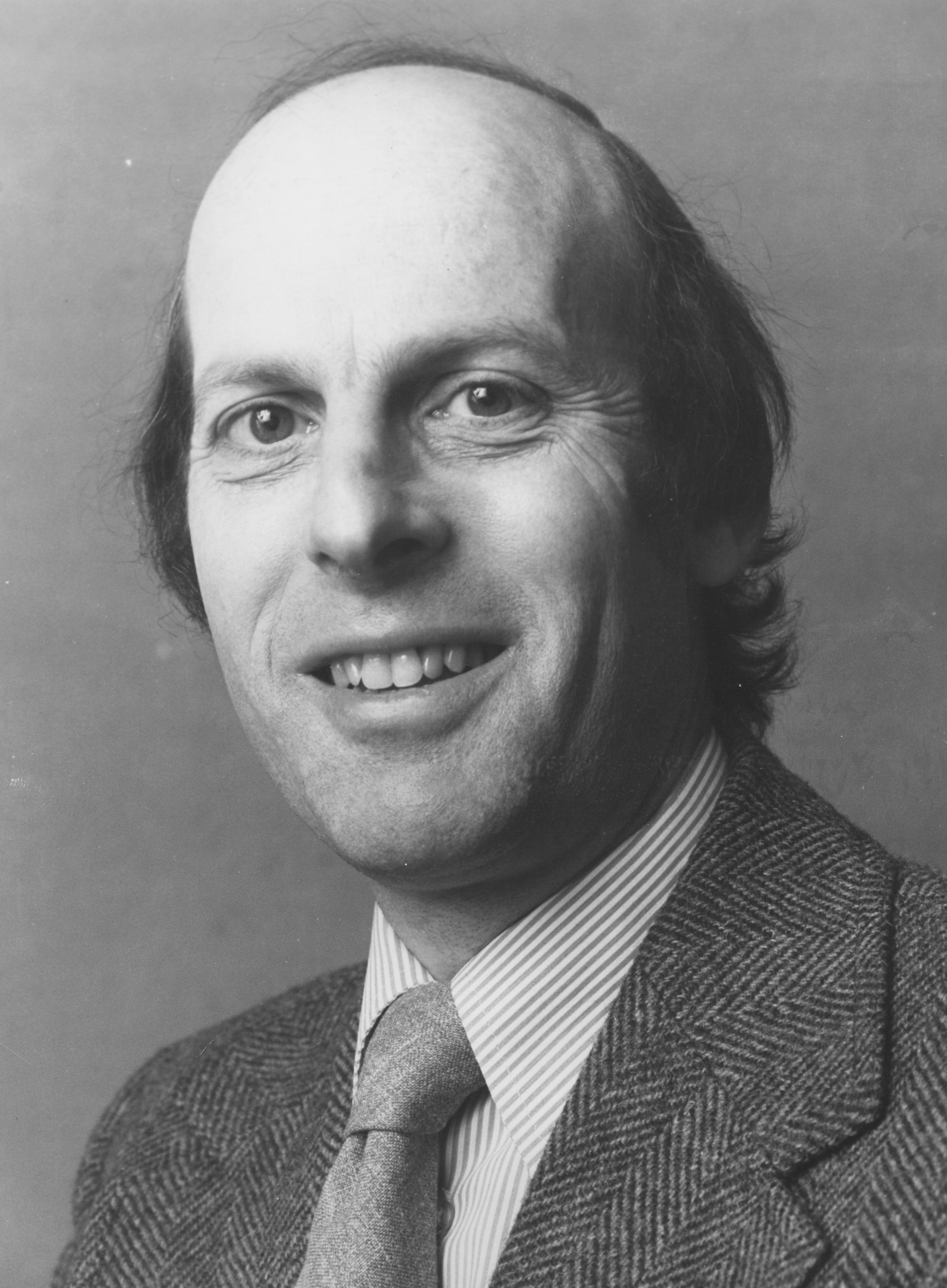
- Professor Michael Zander, 1977
- Born: Berlin
- Education: University of Cambridge
- Relatives: Benjamin Zander and Angelica Zander Rudenstine (siblings); Neil Rudenstine (brother-in-law)
- Awards: QC
- Scientific career
- Fields: Law
- Workplaces: London School of Economics

Michael Zander, KC, FBA, (born 16 November 1932 in Berlin) is a British legal scholar. He is Professor Emeritus of Law at the London School of Economics and Political Science. Zander was a member of the Royal Commission on Criminal Justice (1991–1993). He is currently a member of the Home Office's PACE Strategy Board.

== Early life and education ==
Zander was born in Berlin, Germany in 1932. He is the son of lawyer and scholar Walter Zander and Margarete (Gretl) Magnus. In 1937, when he was four years old, the family emigrated from Germany to England because of their Jewish background. His brother is conductor Benjamin Zander and his sister is curator Angelica Zander Rudenstine, while his brother-in-law is academic Neil Rudenstine.

After attending the Royal Grammar School, High Wycombe from 1946 to 1951, he won an Open Exhibition in English at Jesus College, Cambridge, where he took a Double First Honours Degree in Law, then obtained a First Class in the LLB and was awarded the Whewell Scholarship in International Law. Zander then took an LLM at Harvard Law School.

== Career ==
Zander worked with the law firm of Sullivan & Cromwell on Wall Street for a year before returning to the United Kingdom in 1959. He gave up his scholarship at Lincoln's Inn and became a solicitors’ articled clerk with Ashurst Morris Crisp. He became a qualified solicitor in 1962. During his clerkship he was legal adviser to Tony Benn in his battle to remain in the House of Commons.

In 1963, Zander joined the LSE Law Department. He was appointed to a Chair in 1977; he was Convenor (Dean) of the Law Department from 1984 to 1988 and again in 1997–98. He was appointed an Honorary Queen's Counsel in 1997 and was elected a Senior Fellow of the British Academy in 2005. Professor Zander retired from the LSE in 1998. Twenty-five years later he was still active, writing and publishing articles and new editions of his books.

From 1963 to 1988, he was also Legal Correspondent of The Guardian newspaper, for which he wrote more than 1,400 pieces.

== Selected publications ==
BOOKS

- Lawyers and the Public Interest (Weidenfeld and Nicolson,1968)
- Cases and Materials on the English Legal System (1st edn.1973, Weidenfeld and Nicolson, 10th edn., 2007, Cambridge University Press)
- A Bill of Rights? (1st edn.1974 Barry Rose, 4th edn. 1997, Sweet & Maxwell)
- Legal Services for the Community (Maurice Temple Smith, 1978)
- The Law-Making Process (1st edn. 1980, Weidenfeld and Nicolson, 9th edn. 2025, Hart Publications)
- Zander on PACE The Police and Criminal Evidence Act 1984 (Sweet & Maxwell,1st edn.1985, 9th edn.2023)
- A Matter of Justice, The Legal System in Ferment(Tauris, 1st edn.1988, revised edn.OUP,1989)
- The Crown Court Study (Royal Commission on Criminal Justice, Research Study No.19, HMSO 1993)
- The State of Justice (The 1999 Hamlyn Lectures, Sweet & Maxwell 2000)

And over 400 articles in legal and other journals.

In 2010, he received an Honorary LL.D from King's College, London. The citation stated:'He has devoted a long and active career to the study, teaching, practice and improvement of the law, and has made outstanding contributions in both the academic and public spheres. There is no greater authority in the fields to which he has devoted himself: criminal procedure, civil procedure, legal system, legal profession and legal services. The central mission of his professional life has been to make the justice system work better.’

In 2015, he was awarded the Halsbury Lifetime Contribution Award.
