= Walter Zander =

German lawyer, scholar and writer (1898–1993)

- Born: 8 June 1898; Erfurt, German Empire (now in Germany)
- Died: 7 April 1993 (aged 94); South Croydon, London, England
- Education: University of Jena; Humboldt University of Berlin
- Children: 4 (including Michael, Benjamin, and Angelica)

Walter Zander (8 June 1898, Erfurt – 7 April 1993, South Croydon) was a German-British lawyer, scholar and writer. He was Secretary of the British Friends of the Hebrew University in Jerusalem 1944–1971, Governor of the University 1972–1993, Senior Associate Fellow at St Antony's College, Oxford 1971–1988, and author of several books and articles, many of them about Israel and its international relations.

The son of a prominent Erfurt lawyer, he studied at the Gymnasium, before being called up for military service in 1916. During World War I, he served as a non-commissioned officer in the German Army and was awarded the Iron Cross. After the war, he went on to study law, philosophy and economics in Jena and Berlin. After a brief period as an assistant to one of the leading lawyers in Berlin, he set up his own practice in the city. In 1929, he took a one-year leave from his practice to study economics at the London School of Economics and the Sorbonne University.

In 1931 he married Margarete (Gretl) Magnus, daughter of famous physiologist/pharmacologist, Professor Rudolf Magnus. They had three sons and a daughter, among them legal scholar Michael Zander, conductor Benjamin Zander, and art curator Angelica Zander Rudenstine.

As a Jew, he left Nazi Germany, emigrating with his family to the United Kingdom in 1937, where he set up a printing business in Slough. Soon after, however, he was interned for ten months as an enemy alien on the Isle of Man during World War II. In the internment camp, he was one of those who started "a kind of university, which offered many different lectures on the most varied subjects ranging from theoretical physics to Greek philosophy and Russian for beginners" with his fellow prisoners.

His writings in English are accessible at www.walterzander.info.

From 1944, for 27 years, he was Secretary of the British Friends of the Hebrew University in Jerusalem. After retiring he became a Senior Associate Fellow of St Antony's College, Oxford.

== Books ==
- Soviet Jewry, Palestine and the West, London, Gollancz, 1947
- Is This The Way?, London, Gollancz, 1948
- Israel and the Holy Places of Christendom, London, Weidenfeld and Nicolson, 1971
