= Angelica Zander Rudenstine =

American art historian and curator

- Born: Angelica Zander; May 24, 1937 (age 89); Germany
- Occupations: Curator; art historian; arts administrator
- Spouse: Neil Rudenstine (m. 1960)
- Father: Walter Zander
- Relatives: Michael Zander and Benjamin Zander (brothers); David Rudenstine (brother-in-law)
- Awards: Guggenheim Fellowship (1983)

Academic background
- Education: University of Oxford; Smith College

Academic work
- Discipline: Art history
- Institutions: Museum of Fine Arts, Boston; Solomon R. Guggenheim Museum; New York University Institute of Fine Arts

Angelica Zander Rudenstine (born May 24, 1937) is an American curator, art historian, and arts administrator. She worked as a curator at the Museum of Fine Arts, Boston and Solomon R. Guggenheim Museum, with her work including Art of the Avant-Garde in Russia (1981) and Peggy Guggenheim Collection, Venice (1985). She is a 1983 Guggenheim Fellow and a 1994 Fellow of the American Association for the Advancement of Science.

== Biography ==
Angelica Zander was born on May 24, 1937, in Germany. Her father, legal scholar Walter Zander, is Jewish, and his wife Margaret is a Dutch Protestant. The family fled to England later that year due to Adolf Hitler's Nazi regime. She attended the University of Oxford, where she got a BA in Honours in 1959 and an ΜA in 1961. She also obtained an MA from Smith College in 1961.

She worked as a curator at the Museum of Fine Arts, Boston Department of European Paintings from 1960 to 1968. From 1965 to 1968, she served as editor of the Bulletin of the Museum of Fine Arts, as well as editor-in-chief of the museum's publications. She freelanced as an editor at the Museum of Modern Art (1968-1969). In 1969, she joined the Solomon R. Guggenheim Museum as a consultant. She served at the museum research curator from 1973 to 1980 and as adjunct curator from 1980 to 1981. She later chaired the Harvard University Department of Fine Arts' supervisory committee and worked at the Mellon Foundation as senior advisor of museums and art conservation. She also worked at New York University Institute of Fine Arts as an adjunct professor.

In 1976, she published the two-volume The Guggenheim Museum Collection: Paintings, 1880-1945. In 1981, she and Margit Rowell prepared Art of the Avant-Garde in Russia for the Guggenheim's exhibition of George Costakis' art. (Note: Reviews of this book:) In 1983, she was awarded a Guggenheim Fellowship "for a conceptual and historical study of museums of modern art". She later wrote a 1985 catalogue of the Peggy Guggenheim Collection in Venice and authored the fourth volume of Harvard University Art Museum's Modern Painting, Drawing and Sculpture Collected By Emily and Joseph Pulitzer Jr., (Note: Reviews of this book:) (Note: Reviews of this book:) winning a 1988 Mitchell Prize for the History of Art for the latter.

She was appointed a Fellow of the American Association for the Advancement of Science in 1994.

=== Personal life ===
In 1960, she married Neil Rudenstine, whom she met through mutual friends when he was a Rhodes Scholar at Oxford; he would later serve as president of Harvard University from 1991 to 2001. They had three children. As of 1991, she lived in Princeton, New Jersey, commuting daily by train to work in New York City.

Her brothers are legal scholar Michael Zander and conductor Benjamin Zander, and her brother-in-law is legal scholar David Rudenstine.

== Publications ==
- The Guggenheim Museum Collection: Paintings, 1880-1945 (1976)
- Art of the Avant-Garde in Russia (1981, with Margit Rowell)
- Peggy Guggenheim Collection, Venice (1985)
- Modern Painting, Drawing & Sculpture (1989)
