= 2018 Rally Estonia =

2018 Estonian motor rally

2018 Rally Estonia: 8. Shell Helix Rally Estonia 2018
- Host country: Estonia
- Rally base: Otepää, Valga County
- Dates run: 13 – 15 July 2018
- Start location: Neeruti, Valga County
- Finish location: Elva, Tartu County
- Stages: 16 (146.40 km; 90.97 miles)
- Stage surface: Gravel
- Transport distance: 529.78 km (329.19 miles)
- Overall distance: 676.18 km (420.16 miles)

Statistics
- Crews: 104 at start, 52 at finish

Overall results
- Overall winner: (Estonia) Ott Tänak (Estonia) Martin Järveoja (Japan) Toyota Gazoo Racing WRT; 1:12:31.9

The 2018 Rally Estonia (formally known as the Shell Helix Rally Estonia 2018) was a motor racing event for rally cars that was held over three days between 13 and 15 July 2018. It marked the eighth running of Rally Estonia. The event consisted of sixteen special stages totalling 146.40 km (90.97 mi) in competitive kilometres. The stages were run on smooth gravel roads of Southern Estonia. Two street stages were also held during the rally, in Tartu and in Elva. Rally headquarters and service park were based in Otepää, at the Tehvandi Sports Center, while city of Tartu hosted the ceremonial start and finish.

Ott Tänak & Martin Järveoja won the rally, while Hayden Paddon & Sebastian Marshall finished second and Craig Breen & Scott Martin finished third. For the first time in the competition's history a total of three current WRC works teams entered Rally Estonia. It was also the first time the new Toyota Yaris WRC entered a competition outside the WRC series. Tänak & Järveoja were dominant on their home ground winning eleven stages out of sixteen.

== Report ==
=== Classification ===
Pos.	No.	Driver	Co-driver	Team	Car	Time	Difference
Overall classification
1	1	(Estonia) Ott Tänak	(Estonia) Martin Järveoja	(Japan) Toyota Gazoo Racing WRT	Toyota Yaris WRC	1:12:31.9	0.0
2	3	(New Zealand) Hayden Paddon	(United Kingdom) Sebastian Marshall	(South Korea) Hyundai Motorsport	Hyundai i20 Coupe WRC	1:13:31.0	+59.1
3	2	(Republic of Ireland) Craig Breen	(United Kingdom) Scott Martin	(France) Citroën Total Abu Dhabi WRT	Citroën C3 WRC	1:15:44.3	+3:12.4
4	7	(Finland) Eerik Pietarinen	(Finland) Juhana Raitanen	(Finland) TGS Worldwide	Škoda Fabia R5	1:16:33.6	+4:01.7
5	6	(Finland) Jari Huttunen	(Finland) Antti Linnaketo	(South Korea) Hyundai Motorsport	Hyundai i20 R5	1:16:51.6	+4:19.7
6	4	(Estonia) Georg Gross	(Estonia) Raigo Mõlder	(Estonia) OT Racing	Ford Focus RS WRC 08	1:17:07.2	+4:35.3
7	5	(Ukraine) Valeriy Gorban	(Estonia) Sergei Larens	(Ukraine) Eurolamp World Rally Team	Mini John Cooper Works WRC	1:17:47.9	+5:16.0
8	16	(Estonia) Raul Jeets	(Estonia) Andrus Toom	(Estonia) Tehase Auto	Škoda Fabia R5	1:18:03.9	+5:32.0
9	12	(Estonia) Ranno Bundsen	(Estonia) Robert Loštšenikov	(Estonia) A1M Motorsport	Mitsubishi Lancer Evo VIII	1:19:21.1	+6:49.2
10	11	(Estonia) Rainer Aus	(Estonia) Simo Koskinen	(Estonia) ALM Motorsport	Volkswagen Polo Proto	1:19:55.6	+7:23.7

=== Special stages ===
Date	No.	Stage name	Distance	Winners	Car	Time	Rally leaders
13 July	—	Otepää [Shakedown]	1.00 km	Tänak / Järveoja	Toyota Yaris WRC	—	—
14 July	SS1	Raiga 1	6.24 km	Tänak / Järveoja	Toyota Yaris WRC	3:06.6	Tänak / Järveoja
14 July	SS2	Arula 1	8.74 km	Tänak / Järveoja	Toyota Yaris WRC	3:59.0	Tänak / Järveoja
14 July	SS3	Rüa 1	8.68 km	Tänak / Järveoja	Toyota Yaris WRC	4:18.8	Tänak / Järveoja
14 July	SS4	Raiga 2	6.24 km	Tänak / Järveoja	Toyota Yaris WRC	3:03.8	Tänak / Järveoja
14 July	SS5	Arula 2	8.74 km	Breen / Martin	Citroën C3 WRC	3:54.4	Tänak / Järveoja
14 July	SS6	Rüa 2	8.68 km	Tänak / Järveoja	Toyota Yaris WRC	4:14.5	Tänak / Järveoja
14 July	SS7	Karste 1	6.42 km	Paddon / Marshall	Hyundai i20 Coupe WRC	3:01.1	Tänak / Järveoja
14 July	SS8	Krüüdneri 1	13.67 km	Breen / Martin	Citroën C3 WRC	7:21.3	Tänak / Järveoja
14 July	SS9	Karste 2	6.42 km	Tänak / Järveoja	Toyota Yaris WRC	2:57.3	Tänak / Järveoja
14 July	SS10	Krüüdneri 2	13.67 km	Tänak / Järveoja	Toyota Yaris WRC	7:11.6	Tänak / Järveoja
14 July	SS11	Tartu City	1.74 km	Tänak / Järveoja	Toyota Yaris WRC	1:44.8	Tänak / Järveoja
15 July	SS12	Puugi 1	10.16 km	Tänak / Järveoja	Toyota Yaris WRC	4:38.0	Tänak / Järveoja
15 July	SS13	Prangli 1	17.05 km	Breen / Martin	Citroën C3 WRC	8:15.9	Tänak / Järveoja
15 July	SS14	Puugi 2	10.16 km	Tänak / Järveoja	Toyota Yaris WRC	4:30.4	Tänak / Järveoja
15 July	SS15	Prangli 2	17.05 km	Tänak / Järveoja	Toyota Yaris WRC	8:08.1	Tänak / Järveoja
15 July	SS16	Elva City	1.74 km	Gross / Mõlder	Ford Focus RS WRC 08	1:29.6	Tänak / Järveoja
