= Douglas Bush =

American literary critic (1896–1983)

John Nash Douglas Bush (1896–1983) was a literary critic and literary historian. He taught for most of his life at Harvard University, where his students included many of the most prominent scholars, writers, and academics of several generations, including Walter Jackson Bate, Neil Rudenstine, Paul Auster and Aharon Lichtenstein.

Bush's textual criticism on Shakespeare and John Milton was widely influential. His English Literature in the Earlier Seventeenth Century remains a standard reference work.

He received his doctorate from Harvard University in 1923.

== Major works ==
- The Renaissance and English Humanism (1939)
- English Literature in the Earlier Seventeenth Century, 1600-1660 (1st ed. 1945, 2d ed. 1962)
  - (reprinted as): The Early Seventeenth Century 1600-1660: Jonson, Donne, and Milton (The Oxford History of English Literature, 1990)
- Science and English Poetry: A Historical Sketch, 1590-1950 (1950)
- Classical Influences in Renaissance Literature (1952)
- Prefaces to Renaissance Literature (1965)
- Engaged and Disengaged (1966)

== Editions ==
- John Keats. Selected Poems and Letters (1959)
- John Milton. The Complete Poetical Works (1965)
- A Variorum Commentary on the Poems of John Milton. Volume I: The Latin and Greek Poems (1970)
