= Boston Philharmonic Youth Orchestra =

The Boston Philharmonic Youth Orchestra (BPYO) is the youth orchestra of the Boston Philharmonic. Created in 2012, the tuition-free orchestra consists of musicians between the ages of 12–21. The BPYO performs an annual concert series in Boston as well as international tours and has released two commercial recordings. The founder and current conductor of the orchestra is Benjamin Zander.

== History ==
The BPYO was founded in 2012 by Benjamin Zander, the conductor of the Boston Philharmonic Orchestra. The inaugural 2012–13 season of the BPYO culminated in a five-city concert tour of the Netherlands, featuring a performance of Mahler's Second Symphony in the Amsterdam Concertgebouw. In December 2013, the orchestra made its Carnegie Hall debut with Shostakovich's Symphony No. 5, a performance that is now released on a Linn Records recording. In the summer of 2015, the BPYO embarked on a two-week tour of Germany, Switzerland, and the Czech Republic, performing in concert halls including Smetana Hall, the Rudolfinium, and the Philharmonie. In June 2016, BPYO returned to Carnegie Hall for two concerts, before embarking on a concert tour to Spain. In 2017, BPYO toured Peru, Argentina, and Uruguay.

The BPYO is known for performing some of the most difficult pieces in the classical repertoire, with a focus on 19th and 20th century music. It has performed with many soloists including Anna Fedorova, Alisa Weilerstein, George Li, Jonah Ellsworth, Natalia Gutman, Alwyn Mellor, InMo Yang, Zlatomir Fung, and Ayano Ninomiya. For the 2016–17 season, the BPYO commissioned a piece by American composer Michael Gandolfi.

== Members ==
The BPYO consists of roughly 120 musicians between the ages of 12 and 21 in the Greater Boston Area, with musicians coming from as far as New Hampshire, Vermont, Rhode Island, Connecticut, New York, New Jersey, and Maine. The orchestra is composed of an estimated 40% college students and 60% high school students. The college musicians attend schools such as New England Conservatory, Harvard University, Tufts University, Boston University, The Boston Conservatory, Northeastern University, and The Juilliard School.

== Activities ==
The orchestra rehearses weekly at the Benjamin Franklin Institute of Technology and receives coaching from musicians of the Boston Symphony and Boston Philharmonic orchestras.

The BPYO performs at least three concerts a season in Boston. Performances take place in venues such as Symphony Hall, and Sanders Theatre. The 2014–2015 season included their semiannual concerto competition for members in the orchestra and performances of Wagner's Siegfried, Bartok's Concerto for Orchestra, and Schoenberg's Five Pieces for Orchestra, among others. The 2015–2016 season includes performances of The Rite of Spring, La mer, Beethoven's Symphony No. 3, and Mahler's Symphony No. 1.

The orchestra frequently tours, often internationally. These include tours to the Netherlands, Germany, Switzerland, the Czech Republic, Spain, Peru, Argentina, Uruguay, Brazil and two tours to Carnegie Hall. The orchestra made its debut at Young Euro Classic in 2018.

Some members of the orchestra also participate in the Boston Philharmonic's outreach program, Crescendo!. Through this program, musicians are able to perform for and teach local students in the Boston area.

== Closure ==
In March 2026, managing director Sean Lewis announced that the BPYO and its parent organization, the Boston Philharmonic Orchestra, would wind down operations following the 2026–27 season, with final performances concluding in June 2027. Both organizations will transition into a newly formed legacy project called the Zander Center, which will serve as the headquarters for Zander's artistic and educational endeavors and house the Boston Philharmonic's digital media archive. The BPYO's final concerts will take place on a tour of European musical capitals in June 2027, performing Mahler's Symphony No. 2—the same work it presented during its inaugural 2012–13 season.
