= Boston Philharmonic Orchestra =

American semi-professional orchestra

Background information
- Origin: Boston, Massachusetts, U.S.
- Genre: classical music
- Years active: 1979–present
- Website: bostonphil.org

The Boston Philharmonic Orchestra is a semi-professional orchestra based in Boston, Massachusetts, United States. It was founded in 1979.

Their concerts take place at Boston's Symphony Hall, New England Conservatory's Jordan Hall and at Harvard University's Sanders Theatre. The orchestra has been conducted by Benjamin Zander since it was founded in 1979. Each concert is preceded by a talk which Zander explains the musical ideas and structure of the pieces about to be performed.

== Closure ==
In March 2026, managing director Sean Lewis announced that the Boston Philharmonic Orchestra and its affiliated Boston Philharmonic Youth Orchestra would wind down operations following the 2026–27 season, ending 48 years of performances. Both organizations will transition into a newly formed legacy project called the Zander Center, which will serve as the headquarters for Zander's artistic and educational endeavors and house the orchestra's digital media archive. The BPO's final concert will feature Mahler's Symphony No. 9—the same work performed at the orchestra's first concert in 1979.
