= Kristo Dominković =

Serbian journalist and writer (1877–1946)

Kristo P. Dominković (Serbian Cyrillic: Кристо Доминковић; 16 January 1877 - 20 October 1946) was a Serbian journalist and writer from Dubrovnik. He was a contributor to several magazines, and was best known for being the long-time editor of the magazine Dubrovnik.

== Biography ==
Krsto P. Dominković was born in Dubrovnik on 16 January 1877, then part of Austria-Hungary. He finished high school in Dubrovnik, and then went to Vienna to study medicine and distinguished himself by being active in organizations of Serbian student youth. After a few semesters, he returned to Dubrovnik and began working in journalism.

After the death of Antun Fabris he at one point served as the editor of the "Srđ" magazine. He was one of the founders of the Serbian Gymnastics Association "Dušan Silni", editor-in-chief, publisher and owner of the "Dubrovnik" newspaper (with brief interruptions), member of the Sokol Association, and before the First World War, he was interned in various cities in Austria-Hungary from 1914 to 1917, and after that he was kept under house arrest.

After the First World War, he cooperated with all Serbian cultural societies in Dubrovnik, and was a member of the People's Radical Party. During his life, he wrote for the newspapers "Srđ", "Dubrovnik", "Srpski glasnik", "Srbin", "Zora", "Sletski sokolski vesnik Sokolske župe Mostar", "Narodna odbrana", "Čuvajte Jugoslaviju" and "Dačićeve narodne novine". His writing advocated for a Serbian supremacy among the South Slavs. He signed with the initials K. P. D., K.D and under the pseudonym Živo Knimod.

He was awarded the Order of Saint Sava for his many merits.

He died on 20 October 1946 in Dubrovnik. He was 69 years old at the time.
