= Neil Rudenstine =

American scholar and college administrator (born 1935)

26th President of Harvard University
- In office July 1, 1991 – June 30, 2001
- Preceded by: Derek C. Bok
- Succeeded by: Larry Summers

Personal details
- Born: Neil Leon Rudenstine; January 21, 1935 (age 91) Danbury, Connecticut, U.S.
- Spouse: Angelica Zander
- Children: 3

Academic background
- Education: Princeton University (BA); New College, Oxford (MA); Harvard University (PhD)
- Thesis: Sir Philip Sidney: The styles of love (1964)
- Doctoral advisor: Douglas Bush

Academic work
- Discipline: English and American Literature
- Sub-discipline: Renaissance literature

Neil Leon Rudenstine (born January 21, 1935) is an American scholar, educator, and administrator. He served as president of Harvard University from 1991 to 2001.

== Early life and education ==
Rudenstine was born in Danbury, Connecticut, on January 21, 1935, the son of Mae (née Esperito) and Harry Rudenstine, a prison guard. His father was a Ukrainian Jew who emigrated from Kyiv, his mother a Roman Catholic and the daughter of immigrants from Campobasso, Italy.

Rudenstine was raised as a Roman Catholic and grew up speaking Italian with his mother's family. Later in life, he said, he began to understand more about his Jewish heritage. He also pointed out that he had attended an Episcopal boarding school and a university with Presbyterian roots. "One way or another, I've become extremely ecumenical", he said. He attended the Wooster School in Danbury on a scholarship and was selected to participate in Camp Rising Sun, the Louis August Jonas Foundation's international summer scholarship program.

Rudenstine graduated with an A.B. in English from Princeton University in 1956 after completing his senior thesis, "The Burden of Poetry: A Study in the Art of John Keats, Matthew Arnold and Thomas Stearns Eliot". At Princeton, he participated in Army R.O.T.C. After serving in the U.S. Army as an artillery officer, he attended New College, Oxford, on a Rhodes Scholarship and earned an M.A. In 1964, Rudenstine received a Ph.D. in English literature from Harvard; his dissertation, Sir Philip Sidney: The Styles of Love, directed by Douglas Bush, treated Sidney's poetic development.

== Career ==
From 1964 to 1968, Rudenstine taught at Harvard University as an instructor and then assistant professor in the Department of English and American Literature and Language.

From 1968 to 1988, Rudenstine was a faculty member and senior administrator at Princeton University. A scholar of Renaissance literature, he was an associate professor and then full professor of English. He also held three administrative posts at Princeton, as dean of students (1968–1972), dean of the college (1972–1977), and provost (1977–1988).

From 1988 to 1991, Rudenstine was executive vice president of the Andrew W. Mellon Foundation.

=== President of Harvard ===
From 1991 to 2001, Rudenstine served as president of Harvard University, where he gained a reputation as an effective fundraiser, overseeing a period of highly successful growth in the Harvard endowment.

Rudenstine led Harvard's first university-wide fundraising campaign, raising more than $2.6 billion, surpassing the goal of $2.1 billion. With this funding Harvard increased student financial aid, supported new educational and research programs, built new buildings, and renovated existing spaces. Under Rudenstine, endowments grew from $4.7 billion in 1991 to more than $15 billion.

Rudenstine was a strong supporter of university-based research. In the mid-1990s he helped found the Science Coalition and oversaw the growth of the university's federally sponsored research support, which rose to $320 million in 2000.

During his tenure, Rudenstine worked toward more effective collaboration among Harvard schools. He developed many interdisciplinary programs, such as the Mind, Brain and Behavior Interfaculty Initiative, the University Committee on the Environment, and the David Rockefeller Center for Latin American Studies. He reorganized the university's administrative structure so that the school deans also worked as a consultative cabinet, and he recreated the provost position to oversee the interfaculty initiatives created during his presidency.

Rudenstine oversaw the establishment of the Radcliffe Institute for Advanced Study, which merged Radcliffe College with Harvard. This created a community of faculty and fellows across the arts and sciences, and promoted the study of women, gender, and society. At the time the Dean of Radcliffe Institute of Advanced Study, Drew Faust said of Rudenstine, "He made it possible and continues to offer me and the Institute support in ways too varied to enumerate. The Institute would not exist without him".

Rudenstine advocated for a diverse student body. In April 2000, during the 30th-anniversary celebration of the Department of Afro-American Studies, he said, "Harvard will continue to take ethnicity and race into account, along with many other factors, as it admits students". Rudenstine also was committed to providing increased financial aid and scholarships to students from a range of financial circumstances. Student scholarships and fellowship grants increased from $59 million in 1991 to $132 million in 2000, a year before he left the presidency.

Rudenstine was known as mild-mannered and avoided internal controversy, usually taking a hands-off approach to leading the university. He initially objected to the Harvard Living Wage Campaign of 1998–2001, an initiative that drew the support of thousands of students, faculty, and alumni, including Senator Ted Kennedy. One source of his opposition was the sit-in organized by students and alumni, during which the institution's administrative offices were occupied for more than two weeks, bringing work to a standstill.

In response, Rudenstine formed an Ad Hoc Committee on Employment Policies at Harvard, which surveyed employment practices and delivered a report to the president. The committee cited the university's strong record as an employer and recommended additional measures to build on its offerings for employees, which Rudenstine endorsed and advocated for during the remainder of his tenure.

In November 1994, the University announced that Rudenstine would take a medical leave of absence on the advice of doctors, who noted that he was suffering from severe fatigue and exhaustion. At the time, Rudenstine described the decision to take a leave as one he made with "the greatest reluctance." He took a three-month leave of absence, during which provost Albert Carnesale served as acting president. Rudenstine returned from his absence in February 1994 and went on to serve seven more years until stepping down in 2001.

=== Barnes Foundation and Artstor ===
In 2005, Rudenstine was invited to join the board of Barnes Foundation in Philadelphia, which is responsible for the art collections of Albert C. Barnes. Before taking the job, he investigated the collection's history and produced a book published in 2012, The House of Barnes: The Man, the Collection, the Controversy, which received the American Philosophical Society's John Frederick Lewis Award.

Since 2017, Rudenstine has chaired the Advisory Board for Artstor, where he taught a freshman seminar in 20th-century poetry at Harvard.

== Published works ==
- Pointing Our Thoughts: Reflections on Harvard and Higher Education, 1991–2001 (2001)
- The House of Barnes: The Man, the Collection, the Controversy (2012)
- Ideas of Order: A Close Reading of Shakespeare's Sonnets (2014)

== Memberships and affiliations ==
Rudenstine is an honorary Fellow of New College, Oxford and Emmanuel College, University of Cambridge, and Provost Emeritus at Princeton University. In 1998, as president of Harvard University, Rudenstine was awarded an honorary degree by the University of Oxford, in a ceremony in which the president of Yale University, Richard Levin, was also honored.

Rudenstine is also a Fellow of the American Academy of Arts and Sciences, a former director of the American Council on Education, and a member of the Council on Foreign Relations, the American Philosophical Society, and the Committee for Economic Development.

Rudenstine has been a member of various advisory groups, including the National Commission on Preservation and Access and the Council on Library Resources. He has also served as a trustee of the College Entrance Examination Board and the Wooster School, of which he is a graduate. He serves on the boards of the New York Public Library, the Goldman Sachs Foundation, the Barnes Foundation, and many others in the United States and in Europe.

== Personal life ==
Rudenstine is married to Angelica Zander, an art historian. They have three children and four grandchildren.

Academic offices
Preceded by Derek C. Bok	President of Harvard University; 1991–2001	Succeeded by Lawrence Summers
