= Benjamin Zander =

English conductor (born 1939)

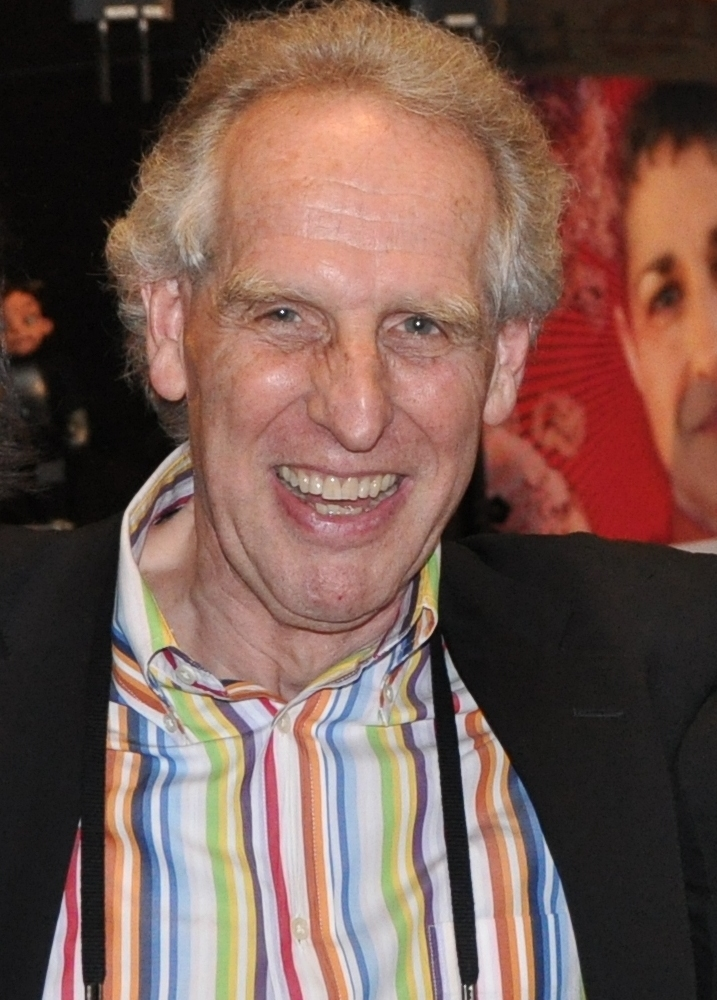

Background information
- Born: 9 March 1939 (age 87); Gerrards Cross, Buckinghamshire, England
- Genres: Classical Music
- Occupations: Conductor, composer, music director, arranger
- Instruments: Cello, piano
- Years active: 1980–present
- Website: www.benjaminzander.com

Benjamin Zander (born 9 March 1939 in Gerrards Cross, Buckinghamshire, England) is an English conductor, who is musical director of the Boston Philharmonic Orchestra and the Boston Philharmonic Youth Orchestra.

== Biography ==
Benjamin Zander was born in Gerrards Cross, Buckinghamshire, England. His parents, Walter and Margarete (née Gretl) Zander, had emigrated from Berlin in 1937 to escape the Nazis, and raised their four children: Michael, Luke, Angelica, and Benjamin. At home, his father would regularly sing and play piano after work. Benjamin Zander is Jewish.

Benjamin Zander started to compose music at the age of nine. Several of his compositions came to the attention of composer Benjamin Britten, who invited the Zander family to spend three summers in Aldeburgh, England, the seaside town in Suffolk where he lived. Benjamin Zander took lessons with Benjamin Britten and became a student of theory of Britten's amanuensis and assistant, Imogen Holst.

=== Early life ===
Zander's main instrument was the cello. He began studying at the age of 10 and became the youngest member of the National Youth Orchestra of Great Britain at the age of 12. He went as a boarder at Uppingham School, as a music scholar at the age of 13 and thence attended St Paul's School, London so he could continue his cello studies with Herbert Withers.

At the age of 15, Zander became a student of the Spanish cello virtuoso Gaspar Cassadó and moved to Florence and Siena, Italy for the next three years. He completed his cello studies at the State Conservatoire in Cologne, Germany where he served as an assistant to Cassadó.

After living abroad for five years, Zander returned to England, completed his A levels and studied at University College London for a degree in English Literature, winning the University-wide English Literature Essay Prize. During his period of study at University, he performed regularly as a cellist, giving recitals and chamber music concerts with the King-Zander-Arieli Trio and taught at the Yehudi Menuhin School for gifted children.

In 1965, he won a Harkness International Fellowship and travelled to the United States for graduate work at Brandeis University, Harvard University and with Leonard Shure and Ernst Oster in New York.

=== New England Conservatory ===
In 1967, Zander joined the faculty of the New England Conservatory of Music and remained on the faculty until 2012. In July 2012, the New England Conservatory and Preparatory School conferred on him the title of Faculty Emeritus, acknowledging his significant contributions to the school over 45 years.

This followed his dismissal in January 2012 for negligence amid allegations he had hired a videographer to record concerts, who had (to Zander's knowledge) previously served a prison sentence for sexual assault of a minor: Zander had also hired the videographer without informing school administrators. Zander later acknowledged that hiring the videographer, Peter Benjamin, was a "significant oversight".

=== Boston Philharmonic ===
Benjamin Zander is the Conductor and Music Director of the Boston Philharmonic Youth Orchestra, a youth orchestra in Boston comprising both high school and college age students. The BPYO rehearses at various venues across Boston, some of which include -Hibernian Hall, The Holy Trinity Armenian Apostle Church and Symphony Hall. Their premiere performance took place in Symphony Hall on 25 November 2012. On the program was Strauss' Ein Heldenleben, Beethoven's Egmont Overture, and Elgar's Cello Concerto with Alisa Weilerstein as soloist. BPYO's first international tour took place the summer of 2013 as the entire orchestra visited The Netherlands to play Mahler's Second Symphony in the Concertgebouw. In 2024 they toured Europe with a program of the Schumann Cello Concerto No. 1 (with Zlatomir Fung), and Mahler’s Fifth Symphony. They visited Basel, Prague, Hamburg, Vienna and Berlin, performing in halls such as Der Musikverein and Die Berliner Philharmonie.

== Personal life ==
Benjamin and Patricia Zander were married in 1966. They have one child, a daughter, Jessica. Jessica and her husband David Tomaszewski have two daughters, M. and Vivian.
