= Kristo Kraag =

Estonian rally co-driver

Kristo Kraag (born 3 February 1979) is an Estonian rally co-driver.

He was born in Tallinn.

He is active in autosport since 2001. Since 2005 he was coached by Markko Märtin and Juss Roden. He is multiple-times Estonian champion in different rally disciplines.

2012–2013 he was the chairman of Estonian Autosport Union's rally committee.

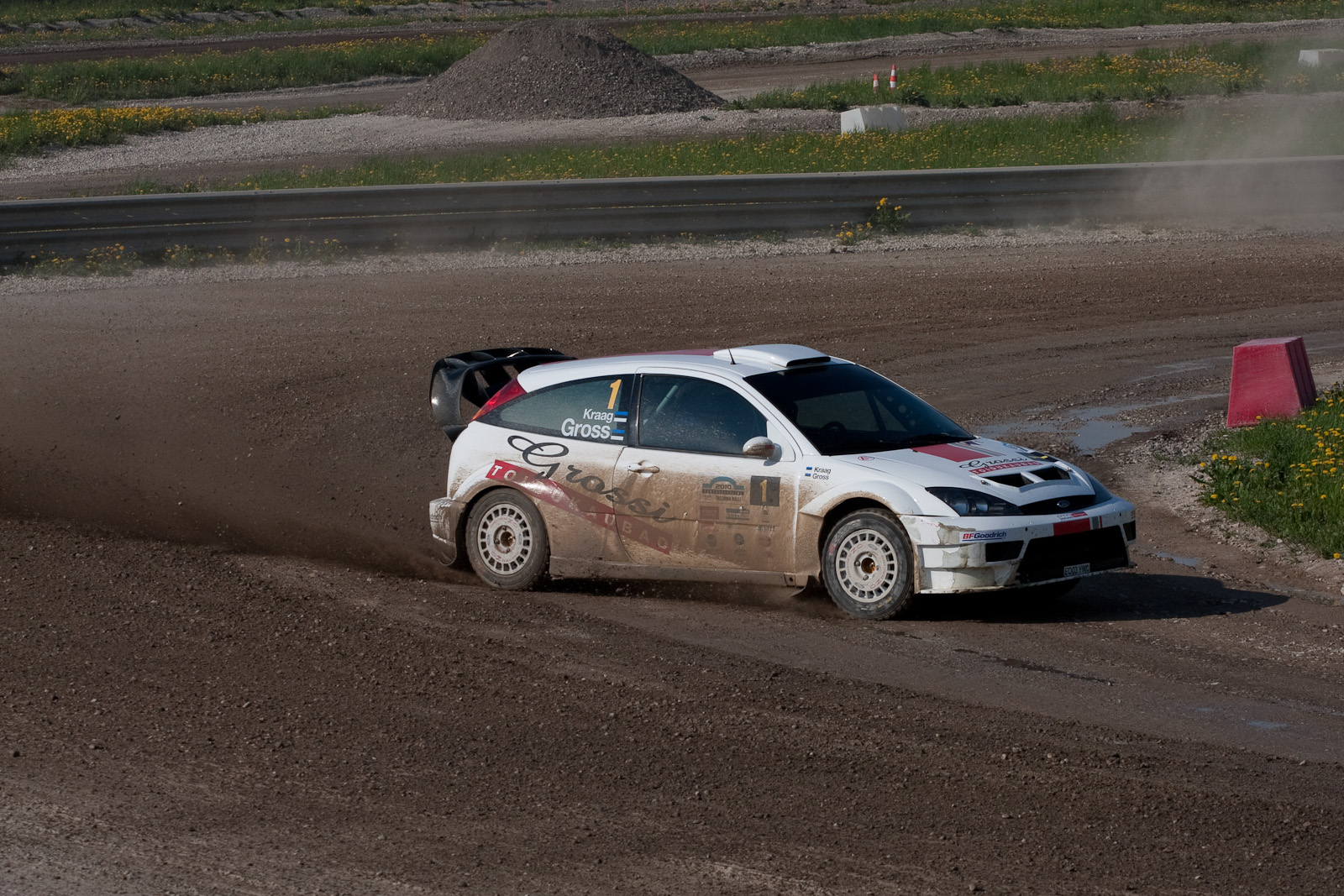
Georg Gross and Kristo Kraag
