= 2021 Estonian Rally Championship =

Champions
- Estonian Drivers' Champion: Georg Gross
- Estonian Co-drivers' Champion: Raigo Mõlder

Seasons
- ← 2020 2022 →

The 2021 Estonian Rally Championship was the sixty-third season of the Estonian Rally Championship.

At the conclusion of the championship, Gross and Mõlder won their fifth and last championship title. They were driving with Ford Fiesta WRC for OT Racing.

== Calendar ==
Round	Start date	Finish date	Rally	Surface	Stages	Distance	Ref
1	12 February	13 February	(Estonia) Otepää talveralli	Snow	8	83.94 km	
2	15 July	16 July	Rally Estonia National Day 1	Gravel, Tarmac	9	129.88 km	
3	17 July	17 July	Rally Estonia National Day 2	Gravel, Tarmac	9	132.18 km	
4	30 July	31 July	(Estonia) Rapla Rally	Gravel, Tarmac	12	102.58 km	
5	28 August	29 August	(Estonia) Lõuna-Eesti Rally	Gravel, Tarmac	10	84.33 km	
6	18 September	18 September	(Estonia) Grossi Toidukaubad Viru Rally	Gravel, Tarmac	8	97.26 km	
7	8 October	9 October	(Estonia) Saaremaa Rally	Gravel, Tarmac	14	132.02 km	

== Results and standings ==
Rally Estonia Day 1 and Day 2 were counted only in EMV2 championship not in the absolute championship.

=== Season summary ===
Round	Event	Winning driver	Winning co-driver	Winning entrant	Winning time	Ref
1	(Estonia) Otepää talveralli	(Estonia) Georg Gross	(Estonia) Raigo Mõlder	(Estonia) OT Racing	46:39.3	
2	Rally Estonia National Day 1					
3	Rally Estonia National Day 2					
4	(Estonia) Rapla Rally	(Estonia) Raul Jeets	(Estonia) Timo Taniel	(Estonia) Tehase Auto	55:17.0	
5	(Estonia) Lõuna-Eesti Rally	(Estonia) Georg Gross	(Estonia) Raigo Mõlder	(Estonia) OT Racing	44:27.0	
6	(Estonia) Grossi Toidukaubad Viru Rally	(Estonia) Georg Gross	(Estonia) Raigo Mõlder	(Estonia) OT Racing	54:19.0	
7	(Estonia) Saaremaa Rally	(Estonia) Georg Gross	(Estonia) Raigo Mõlder	(Estonia) OT Racing	1:06:59.4	

=== Scoring system ===
Position	1st	2nd	3rd	4th	5th	6th	7th	8th	9th	10th	11th	12th	13th	14th	15th	16th	17th	18th	19th	20th	21st	22nd	23rd	24th	25th	26th	27th	28th	29th	30th	31st	32nd	33rd	34th	35th	36th	37th	38th	39th	40th
Points	100	79	67	60	55	51	48	46	45	44	43	42	41	40	39	38	37	36	35	34	33	32	31	30	29	28	27	26	25	24	23	22	21	20	19	18	17	16	15	14

=== Estonian Rally Championship for Drivers ===
Pos	Driver	OTE (Estonia)	RE1 (Estonia)	RE2 (Estonia)	RAP (Estonia)	LÕU (Estonia)	VIR (Estonia)	SAA (Estonia)	Points
1	(Estonia) Georg Gross	1			Ret	1	1	1	400
2	(Estonia) Ranno Bundsen	7			3	6	5	8	267
3	(Russia) Radik Shaymiev	14			4	8	6	11	240
4	(Estonia) Priit Koik	6			2	4	Ret	7	238
5	(Estonia) Raul Jeets				1	52	3	4	229
6	(Estonia) Timmu Kõrge	5				5	4	6	221
7	(Estonia) Kaspar Kasari	18			9	15	11	16	201
8	(Estonia) Kristo Subi	10			6		7	9	188
9	(Poland) Mikołaj Kempa	9			5	11		10	187
10	(Estonia) Siim Liivamägi	15			8	9	8	Ret	176
11	(Estonia) Robert Virves	19				3		3	169
12	(Estonia) Taavi Niinemets	17			Ret	15	9	12	164
13	(Estonia) Patrick Enok	35			16	24	14	23	159
14	(Estonia) Ken Torn						2	2	158
15	(Estonia) Raiko Aru	21			11	Ret	16	15	153
16	(Estonia) David Sultanjants				14	19	13	22	149
17	(Estonia) Georg Linnamäe	3				2			146
18	(Estonia) Joosep Ralf Nõgene	31			17	18	15		136
19	(Estonia) Karl-Markus Sei	22			20	21	Ret	21	133
20	(Estonia) Toomas Vask	Ret			10	Ret	10	13	129

=== Estonian Junior Rally Championship for Drivers ===
Pos	Driver	RE1 (Estonia)	RE2 (Estonia)	RAP (Estonia)	LÕU (Estonia)	VIR (Estonia)	SAA (Estonia)	Points
1	(Estonia) Kaspar Kasari	Ret	1	1	1	1	1	195
2	(Estonia) Joosep Ralf Nõgene	1	2	2	2	2		132
3	(Estonia) Karl-Markus Sei	2	Ret	3	3	Ret	2	72
4	(Finland) Toni Herranen	3	Ret					3
