= 2022 Estonian Rally Championship =

Champions
- Estonian Drivers' Champion: Gregor Jeets
- Estonian Co-drivers' Champion: Timo Taniel

Seasons
- ← 2021 2023 →

The 2022 Estonian Rally Championship was the sixty-fourth season of the Estonian Rally Championship.

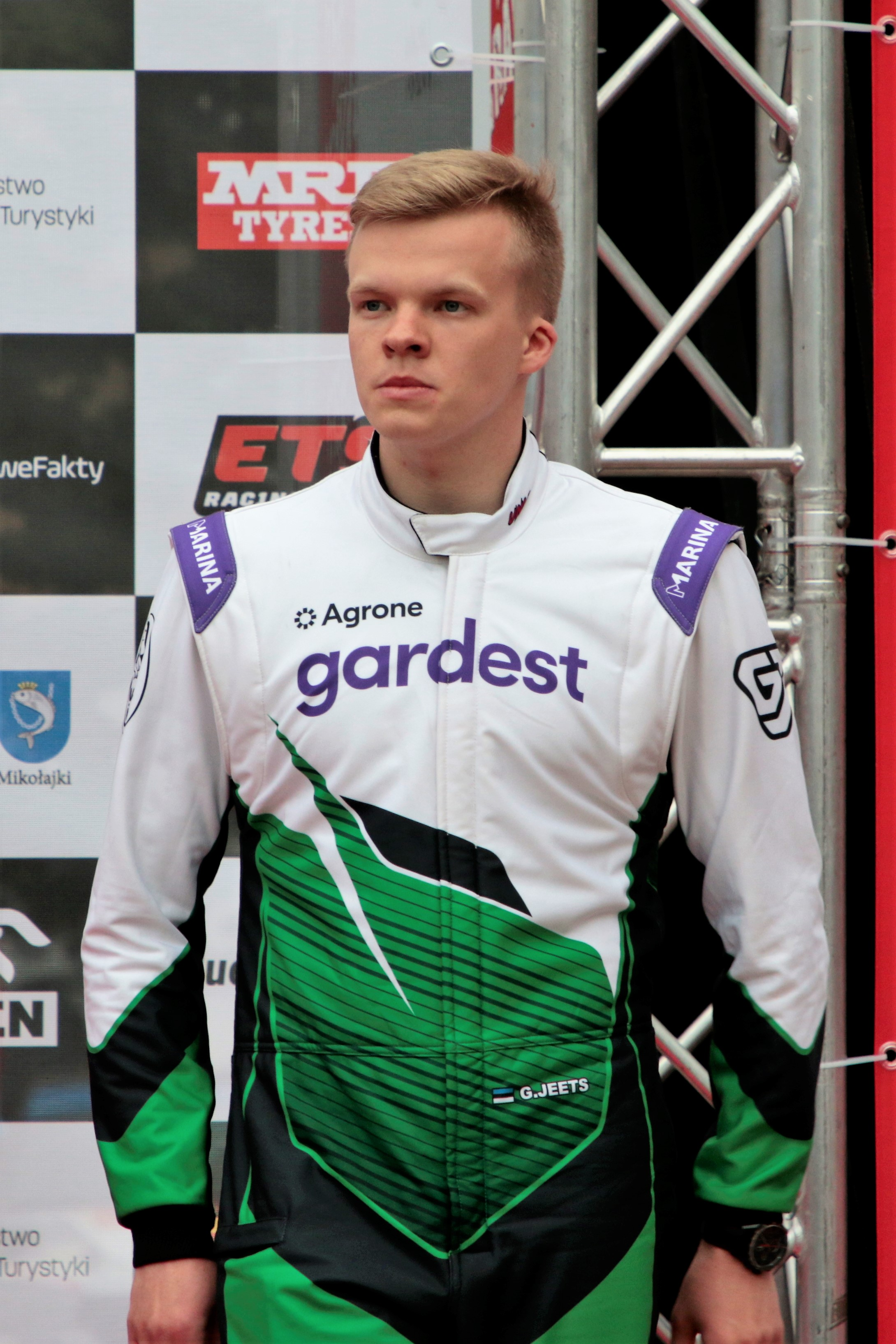
Gregor Jeets won the drivers championship.

At the conclusion of the championship, Jeets and Taniel won their first Estonian championship title. They were driving with Škoda Fabia Rally2 evo.

== Calendar ==
The 2022 season is contested mainly in Estonia, but there is one rally in Latvia which is part of the Estonian Rally Championship.

Round	Start date	Finish date	Rally	Surface	Stages	Distance	Ref
1	29 January	29 January	(Estonia) Sprintralli Otepää Talv	Snow	6	58.47 km	
2	12 February	12 February	(Latvia) Rallijs Sarma	Snow	6	88.44 km	
3	13 May	14 May	(Estonia) Rapla Rally	Gravel, Tarmac	12	102.70 km	
4	14 July	16 July	Rally Estonia National	Gravel	7	76.68 km	
5	26 August	27 August	(Estonia) Lõuna-Eesti Rally	Gravel, Tarmac	10	100.26 km	
6	16 September	17 September	(Estonia) Paide Rally	Gravel, Tarmac	10	122.32 km	
7	7 October	8 October	(Estonia) Saaremaa Rally	Gravel, Tarmac	13	134.56 km	

== Results and standings ==
=== Season summary ===
Round	Event	Winning driver	Winning co-driver	Winning entrant	Winning time	Ref
1	(Estonia) Sprintralli Otepää Talv	(Estonia) Georg Linnamäe	(United Kingdom) James Morgan	(Estonia) ALM Motorsport	35:47.0	
2	(Latvia) Rallijs Sarma	(Ukraine) Valeriy Gorban	(Estonia) Sergei Larens	(Ukraine) Eurolamp WRT	46:40.00	
3	(Estonia) Rapla Rally	(Estonia) Priit Koik	(Estonia) Kristo Tamm	(Estonia) OT Racing	55:46.3	
4	Rally Estonia National	(Estonia) Egon Kaur	(Estonia) Silver Simm	(Estonia) Egon Kaur	44:31.2	
5	(Estonia) Lõuna-Eesti Rally	(Estonia) Gregor Jeets	(Estonia) Timo Taniel	(Estonia) Tehase Auto	52:40.9	
6	(Estonia) Paide Ralli	(Estonia) Gregor Jeets	(Estonia) Timo Taniel	(Estonia) Tehase Auto	1:01:29.7	
7	(Estonia) Saaremaa Rally	(Estonia) Egon Kaur	(Estonia) Silver Simm	(Finland) Rautio Motorsport	1:05:32.9	

=== Scoring system ===
Position	1st	2nd	3rd	4th	5th	6th	7th	8th	9th	10th	11th	12th	13th	14th	15th	16th	17th	18th	19th	20th	21st	22nd	23rd	24th	25th	26th	27th	28th	29th	30th	31st	32nd	33rd	34th	35th	36th	37th	38th	39th	40th
Points	100	79	67	60	55	51	48	46	45	44	43	42	41	40	39	38	37	36	35	34	33	32	31	30	29	28	27	26	25	24	23	22	21	20	19	18	17	16	15	14

=== Estonian Rally Championship for Drivers ===
Pos	Driver	OTE (Estonia)	SAR (Latvia)	RAP (Estonia)	EST (Estonia)	LÕU (Estonia)	PAI (Estonia)	SAA (Estonia)	Points
1	(Estonia) Gregor Jeets	5	6	2	7	1	1	4	465.5
2	(Estonia) Priit Koik	7	7	1	Ret	2		3	318
3	(Estonia) Jaspar Vaher	15	12	11	6	10	5	Ret	254
4	(Estonia) Timmu Kõrge		Ret	4	4	8	2	Ret	245
5	(Estonia) Kaspar Kasari	8		9	Ret	6	3	6	237
6	(Estonia) Taavi Niinemets	17	25	Ret	11	14	4	9	235
7	(Estonia) Robert Virves	14		Ret	3	4		2	228
8	(Estonia) Karl-Markus Sei	16	11	22	9	18	9	Ret	220.5
9	(Latvia) Edgars Balodis	19	17	12	15	Ret	7	17	219.5
10	(Latvia) Edijs Bergmanis		8	Ret	8	3	Ret	7	207
11	(Estonia) Patrick Enok		15	17	14	12	11	Ret	201
11	(Estonia) Allan Popov		Ret	6	27	5	30	10	201
13	(Estonia) Egon Kaur				1			1	200
14	(Estonia) Karl Johannes Visnapuu	25	Ret	20	19	21	14	24	185.5
15	(Estonia) Keiro Orgus		24	41	42	13	13	16	175
16	(Estonia) Romet Jürgenson			Ret	12	17	6	12	171
17	(Estonia) Raiko Aru			15	10	15	8	Ret	168
18	(Estonia) Karel Tölp	43	18	29	18	23	19	Ret	166.5
19	(Estonia) Georg Linnamäe	1	23		2			Ret	160
20	(Estonia) Tarmo Lee	47	19	16	16	Ret	15	Ret	153
21	(Poland) Hubert Laskowski		10		5	7		Ret	147
22	(Estonia) Karl Jalakas	Ret	21	27	21	20	Ret	35	146
23	(Estonia) Pranko Kõrgesaar	23	Ret	25	13	24	26	Ret	142.5
24	(Estonia) Roland Murakas	4	5	5			Ret	Ret	140
25	(Lithuania) Vladas Jurkevičius		3	3				Ret	134
26	(Ukraine) Valeriy Gorban	3	1						133.5
27	(Estonia) Argo Kuutok	31	27	24	33		Ret	14	128.5
28	(Estonia) Joosep Ralf Nõgene	18	14	18	Ret			22	125.5
29	(Estonia) Mark-Egert Tiits	22	Ret	Ret	17	Ret	16	19	125
30	(Estonia) Aiko Aigro	9	9		Ret	9	Ret	Ret	112.5

=== EMV3 Championship ===
Pos	Driver	OTE (Estonia)	SAR (Latvia)	RAP (Estonia)	EST (Estonia)	LÕU (Estonia)	PAI (Estonia)	SAA (Estonia)	Points
1	(Poland) Hubert Laskowski		1		2	2		Ret	91
2	(Estonia) Kaspar Kasari				Ret	1		2	62
3	(Estonia) Rainer Rohtmets							1	35
3	(Estonia) Robert Virves				1				35

=== EMV4 Championship ===
Pos	Driver	OTE (Estonia)	SAR (Latvia)	RAP (Estonia)	EST (Estonia)	LÕU (Estonia)	PAI (Estonia)	SAA (Estonia)	Points
1	(Estonia) Jaspar Vaher	1	2	1	1	1	1	Ret	183.5
2	(Estonia) Karl-Markus Sei	2	1	7	2	3	2	Ret	143
3	(Estonia) Patrick Enok		5	2	4	2	3	Ret	120

=== Estonian Junior Rally Championship for Drivers ===
Pos	Driver	RAP (Estonia)	EST (Estonia)	LÕU (Estonia)	PAI (Estonia)	SAA (Estonia)	Points
1	(Estonia) Jaspar Vaher	1	1	1	1	Ret	181
2	(Estonia) Karl Johannes Visnapuu	4	5	4	2	1	141
3	(Estonia) Pranko Kõrgesaar	6	2	5	4	Ret	77
4	(Estonia) Patrick Enok	2	3	2			69
5	(Germany) Fabio Schwarz	8	4		3		51
6	(Spain) Gil Membrado	5	Ret	3			38
7	(Estonia) Joosep Ralf Nõgene	3	Ret				21
8	(Turkey) Kerem Kazaz	7	Ret				13
