= Rapla Rally =

Rallying competition held in Estonia

Rapla Rally Rapla Ralli
- Status: active
- Genre: motorsporting event
- Date: May
- Frequency: annual
- Location: Rapla
- Country: Estonia
- Inaugurated: 2009
- Most recent: Rapla Rally 2023
- Website: raplaralli.ee
- Rapla Rally 2023

Rapla Rally (Estonian: Rapla ralli) is a rallying event organised in Estonia. Rally is organised by MTÜ GAZ Ralliklubi. The rally competition which annually takes place in Rapla County, Estonia. Rapla Rally is part of the Estonian Rally Championship.

== Winners ==
Year	Driver	Co-driver	Car
2009	(Estonia) Georg Gross	(Estonia) Kristo Kraag	Ford Focus WRC 03
2010	(Estonia) Egon Kaur	(Estonia) Erik Lepikson	Subaru Impreza STi N14
2020	Cancelled due to COVID-19 concerns		
2021	(Estonia) Raul Jeets	(Estonia) Timo Taniel	Škoda Fabia Rally2 evo
2022	(Estonia) Priit Koik	(Estonia) Kristo Tamm	Ford Fiesta Rally2
2023	(Estonia) Priit Koik	(Estonia) Silver Simm	Škoda Fabia Rally2 evo
