= 2015 Rally Poland =

Seventh round of the 2015 World Rally Championship season

2015 Rally Poland 72nd LOTOS Rally Poland
Round 7 of the 2015 World Rally Championship season
← Previous event	Next event →
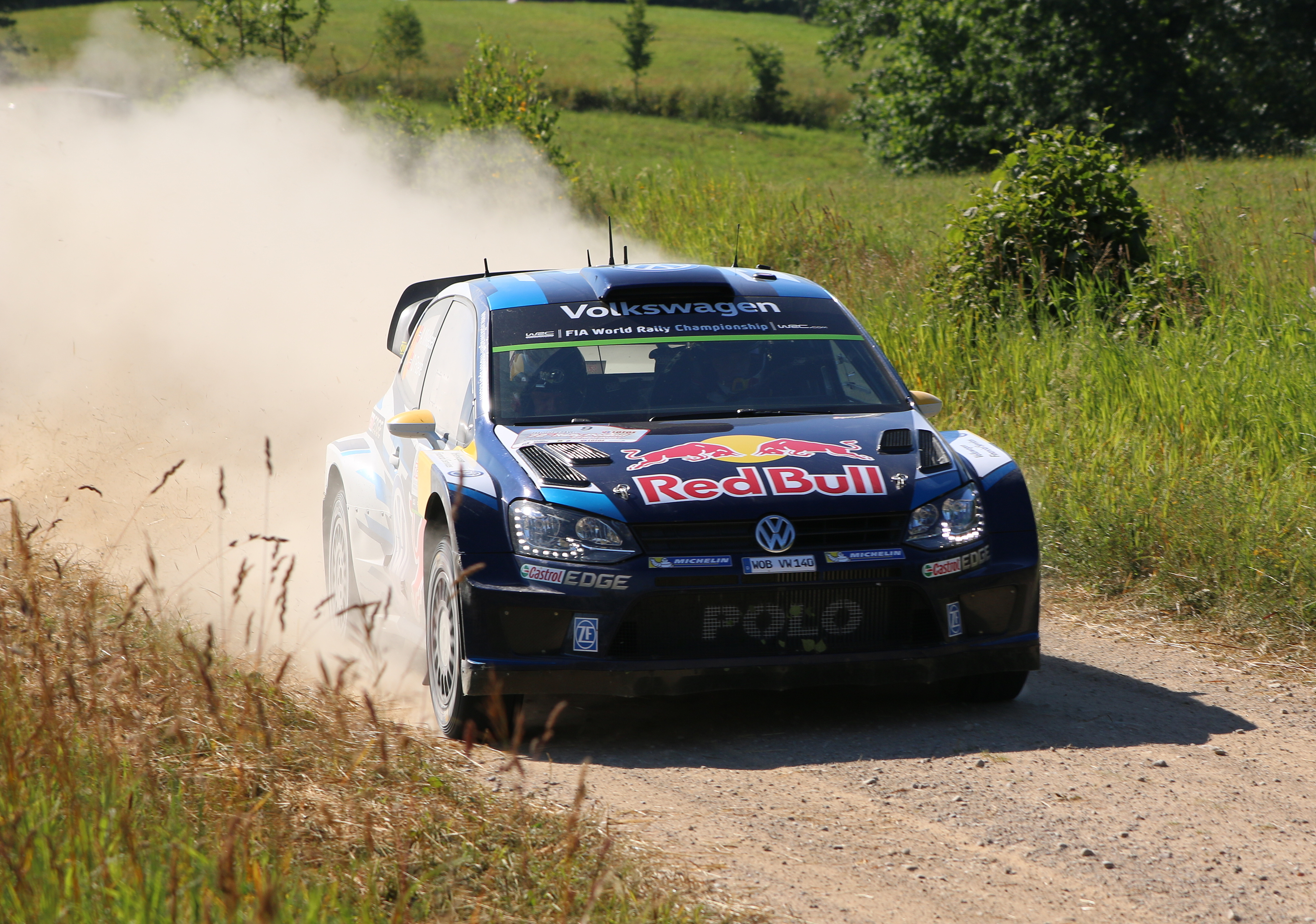
- Andreas Mikkelsen in stage 10
- Host country: Poland
- Rally base: Mikołajki, Poland
- Dates run: 2 – 5 July 2015
- Stages: 19 (313.53 km; 194.82 miles)
- Stage surface: Gravel
- Overall distance: 1,192.20 km (740.80 miles)

Statistics
- Crews: 70 at start, 56 at finish

Overall results
- Overall winner: (France) Sébastien Ogier (France) Julien Ingrassia (Germany) Volkswagen Motorsport

The 2015 Rally Poland was the seventh round of the 2015 World Rally Championship season, held over 2–5 July 2015 and was based at Mikołajki, Poland. Sébastien Ogier won the rally, his fifth victory of the 2015 WRC season.

== Special stages ==
Day	Stage number	Stage name	Length	Stage winner	Car No.	Team	Time	Avg. spd.	Rally leader
2 July	SS1	(Poland) Mikołajki Arena 1	2.50 km	(France) Sébastien Ogier (France) Julien Ingrassia	1	(Germany) Volkswagen Motorsport	1:43.9	86.62 km/h	(France) Sébastien Ogier (France) Julien Ingrassia
3 July	SS2	(Poland) Górkło	13.00 km	(Norway) Andreas Mikkelsen (Norway) Ola Fløene	9	(Germany) Volkswagen Motorsport II	5:57.0	131.09 km/h	(Norway) Andreas Mikkelsen (Norway) Ola Fløene
3 July	SS3	(Poland) Gołdap 1	14.75 km	(Estonia) Ott Tänak (Estonia) Raigo Mõlder	6	(United Kingdom) M-Sport World Rally Team	7:38.1	115.91 km/h	(Estonia) Ott Tänak (Estonia) Raigo Mõlder
3 July	SS4	(Poland) Babki 1	14.65 km	(Estonia) Ott Tänak (Estonia) Raigo Mõlder	6	(United Kingdom) M-Sport World Rally Team	7:11.4	122.25 km/h	(Estonia) Ott Tänak (Estonia) Raigo Mõlder
3 July	SS5	(Poland) Stańczyki 1	39.12 km	(Estonia) Ott Tänak (Estonia) Raigo Mõlder	6	(United Kingdom) M-Sport World Rally Team	19:27.3	120.65 km/h	(Estonia) Ott Tänak (Estonia) Raigo Mõlder
3 July	SS6	(Poland) Babki 2	14.65 km	(France) Sébastien Ogier (France) Julien Ingrassia	1	(Germany) Volkswagen Motorsport	7:01.4	125.15 km/h	(Estonia) Ott Tänak (Estonia) Raigo Mõlder
3 July	SS7	(Poland) Stańczyki 2	39.12 km	(France) Sébastien Ogier (France) Julien Ingrassia	1	(Germany) Volkswagen Motorsport	18:58.0	123.75 km/h	(France) Sébastien Ogier (France) Julien Ingrassia
3 July	SS8	(Poland) Gołdap 2	14.75 km	(Finland) Jari-Matti Latvala (Finland) Miikka Anttila	2	(Germany) Volkswagen Motorsport	7:36.2	116.40 km/h	(France) Sébastien Ogier (France) Julien Ingrassia
3 July	SS9	(Poland) Mikołajki Arena 2	2.50 km	(Czech Republic) Martin Prokop (Czech Republic) Jan Tománek	21	(Czech Republic) Jipocar Czech National Team	1:46.4	84.59 km/h	(France) Sébastien Ogier (France) Julien Ingrassia
4 July									(France) Sébastien Ogier (France) Julien Ingrassia
4 July	SS10	(Poland) Mazury 1	17.70 km	(France) Sébastien Ogier (France) Julien Ingrassia	1	(Germany) Volkswagen Motorsport	8:54.9	119.13 km/h	(France) Sébastien Ogier (France) Julien Ingrassia
4 July	SS11	(Poland) Wieliczki 1	12.87 km	(Estonia) Ott Tänak (Estonia) Raigo Mõlder	6	(United Kingdom) M-Sport World Rally Team	6:07.7	126.00 km/h	(France) Sébastien Ogier (France) Julien Ingrassia
4 July	SS12	(Poland) Świętajno 1	21.25 km	(Estonia) Ott Tänak (Estonia) Raigo Mõlder	6	(United Kingdom) M-Sport World Rally Team	10:24.8	122.44 km/h	(France) Sébastien Ogier (France) Julien Ingrassia
4 July	SS13	(Poland) Paprotki	23.15 km	(France) Sébastien Ogier (France) Julien Ingrassia	1	(Germany) Volkswagen Motorsport	11:11.7	124.07 km/h	(France) Sébastien Ogier (France) Julien Ingrassia
4 July	SS14	(Poland) Mazury 2	17.70 km	Stage cancelled					(France) Sébastien Ogier (France) Julien Ingrassia
4 July	SS15	(Poland) Wieliczki 2	12.87 km	(Norway) Andreas Mikkelsen (Norway) Ola Fløene	9	(Germany) Volkswagen Motorsport II	6:01.6	128.13 km/h	(France) Sébastien Ogier (France) Julien Ingrassia
4 July	SS16	(Poland) Świętajno 2	21.25 km	(Estonia) Ott Tänak (Estonia) Raigo Mõlder	6	(United Kingdom) M-Sport World Rally Team	10:05.2	126.40 km/h	(France) Sébastien Ogier (France) Julien Ingrassia
4 July	SS17	(Poland) Mikołajki Arena 3	2.50 km	(France) Sébastien Ogier (France) Julien Ingrassia	1	(Germany) Volkswagen Motorsport	1:45.2	85.55 km/h	(France) Sébastien Ogier (France) Julien Ingrassia
5 July	SS18	(Poland) Baranowo 1	14.60 km	(France) Sébastien Ogier (France) Julien Ingrassia	1	(Germany) Volkswagen Motorsport	6:56.3	126.26 km/h	(France) Sébastien Ogier (France) Julien Ingrassia
5 July	SS19	(Poland) Baranowo 2 (Power stage)	14.60 km	(France) Sébastien Ogier (France) Julien Ingrassia	1	(Germany) Volkswagen Motorsport	6:52.0	127.57 km/h	(France) Sébastien Ogier (France) Julien Ingrassia
