= 2023 Estonian Rally Championship =

Champions
- Estonian Drivers' Champion: Timmu Kõrge
- Estonian Co-drivers' Champion: Arro Vahtra; Erki Pints

Seasons
- ← 2022 2024 →

The 2023 Estonian Rally Championship is the sixty-fifth season of the Estonian Rally Championship.

At the conclusion of the championship, Kõrge with Vahtras and Pints won the Estonian championship title. They were driving with Mitsubishi Lancer Evo 10 for A1M Motorsport.

== Calendar ==
The 2023 season is contested mainly in Estonia, but there is one rally in Latvia which is part of the Estonian Rally Championship.

| Round | Start date | Finish date | Rally | Surface | Stages | Distance | Ref |
|---|---|---|---|---|---|---|---|
| 1 | 4 February | 4 February | (Estonia) Otepää talveralli | Snow | 8 | 110.38 km | |
| 2 | 24 February | 25 February | (Latvia) Rally Alūksne | Snow | 10 | 93.84 km | |
| 3 | 5 May | 6 May | (Estonia) Rapla Rally | Gravel, Tarmac | 12 | 103.96 km | |
| 4 | 20 July | 21 July | Rally Estonia National | Gravel | 5 | 73.84 km | |
| 5 | 25 August | 26 August | (Estonia) Paide Rally | Gravel | 10 | 129.52 km | |
| 6 | 6 October | 7 October | (Estonia) Saaremaa Rally | Gravel | 12 | 124.76 km | |

== Results and standings ==
=== Season summary ===
| Round | Event | Winning driver | Winning co-driver | Winning entrant | Winning time | Ref |
|---|---|---|---|---|---|---|
| 1 | (Estonia) Otepää talveralli | (Estonia) Georg Linnamäe | (United Kingdom) James Morgan | (Estonia) RedGrey Team | 1:00:00.2 | |
| 2 | (Latvia) Rally Alūksne | (Latvia) Emils Blūms | (Latvia) Didzis Eglītis | (Latvia) Rallyworkshop.com | 51:34.32 | |
| 3 | (Estonia) Rapla Rally | (Estonia) Priit Koik | (Estonia) Silver Simm | (Latvia) Sports Racing Technologies | 55:46.3 | |
| 4 | Rally Estonia National | (Estonia) Georg Linnamäe | (United Kingdom) James Morgan | (Estonia) Georg Linnamäe | 42:18.5 | |
| 5 | (Estonia) Paide Rally | (Estonia) Priit Koik | (Estonia) Kristo Tamm | (Latvia) Sports Racing Technologies | 1:02:29.5 | |
| 6 | (Estonia) Saaremaa Rally | (Estonia) Ott Tänak | (Estonia) Robert Virves | (Estonia) RedGrey Team | 1:05:31.5 | |

=== Scoring system ===
| Position | 1st | 2nd | 3rd | 4th | 5th | 6th | 7th | 8th | 9th | 10th | 11th | 12th | 13th | 14th | 15th | 16th | 17th | 18th | 19th | 20th | 21st | 22nd | 23rd | 24th | 25th | 26th | 27th | 28th | 29th | 30th | 31st | 32nd | 33rd | 34th | 35th | 36th | 37th | 38th | 39th | 40th |
| Points | 100 | 79 | 67 | 60 | 55 | 51 | 48 | 46 | 45 | 44 | 43 | 42 | 41 | 40 | 39 | 38 | 37 | 36 | 35 | 34 | 33 | 32 | 31 | 30 | 29 | 28 | 27 | 26 | 25 | 24 | 23 | 22 | 21 | 20 | 19 | 18 | 17 | 16 | 15 | 14 |

=== Drivers' Championships ===
| Pos | Driver | OTE (Estonia) | ALŪ (Latvia) | RAP (Estonia) | EST (Estonia) | PAI (Estonia) | SAA (Estonia) | Points |
|---|---|---|---|---|---|---|---|---|
| 1 | (Estonia) Timmu Kõrge | 4 | 2 | 5 | 7 | 3 | 4 | 369 |
| 2 | (Estonia) Priit Koik | Ret | | 1 | 4 | 1 | 5 | 311 |
| 3 | (Estonia) Kaspar Kasari | 5 | 26 | 3 | 5 | 5 | 7 | 306 |
| 4 | (Latvia) Emils Blūms | 3 | 1 | 2 | 6 | Ret | Ret | 297 |
| 5 | (Estonia) Patrick Enok | 9 | 8 | 13 | 10 | 17 | 9 | 256 |
| 6 | (Estonia) Allan Popov | 6 | 3 | 4 | | 27 | 8 | 249 |
| 7 | (Estonia) Karl-Markus Sei | 12 | 7 | 8 | 9 | 13 | 24 | 248 |
| 8 | (Estonia) Jaspar Vaher | 8 | 6 | 35 | 8 | 8 | 14 | 245 |
| 9 | (Estonia) Oskar Männamets | 10 | 10 | 40 | 13 | 26 | 23 | 202 |
| 10 | (Estonia) Kevin Lempu | 16 | 13 | 10 | 15 | 15 | Ret | 201 |
| 11 | (Estonia) Georg Linnamäe | 1 | | | 1 | | | 200 |
| 12 | (Estonia) Joosep Ralf Nõgene | 11 | 12 | 14 | | 11 | 21 | 199 |
| 13 | (Estonia) Mark-Egert Tiits | 20 | 16 | 9 | Ret | 14 | 17 | 194 |
| 14 | (Estonia) Karl Jalakas | 24 | 23 | 25 | 23 | 32 | 22 | 175 |
| 15 | (Estonia) Urmo Aava | | | 6 | | 2 | 12 | 172 |
| 16 | (Estonia) Markus Tammoja | 21 | 21 | Ret | 35 | 12 | 19 | 163 |
| 17 | (Estonia) Taavi Niinemets | 13 | 15 | Ret | Ret | 9 | | 128 |
| 18 | (Estonia) Joosep Planken | 14 | Ret | 11 | 12 | Ret | | 125 |
| 19 | (Estonia) Pranko Kõrgesaar | 17 | 17 | 18 | Ret | 30 | | 110 |
| 20 | (Estonia) Toomas Vask | 30 | 11 | 16 | | Ret | | 105 |
| Pos. | Driver | OTE (Estonia) | ALŪ (Latvia) | RAP (Estonia) | EST (Estonia) | PAI (Estonia) | SAA (Estonia) | Points |
