= Lõuna-Eesti Rally =

Rallying competition held in Estonia

- Status: active
- Genre: motorsporting event
- Date: July
- Frequency: annual
- Location: Haanja
- Country: Estonia
- Inaugurated: 1991
- Most recent: Lõuna-Eesti Rally 2023
- Website: lounaeestirally.ee
- Lõuna-Eesti Rally 2025

Lõuna-Eesti Rally (South-Estonia Rally) is a rallying event organised in Estonia. Rally is organised by RoadBook MTÜ. The rally is part of Estonian Rally Championship.

== Winners ==
Year	Driver	Co-driver	Car
1991	(Russia) Nikolay Bolshikh	(Russia) Igor Bolshikh	BMW M3 E30
1992	(Estonia) Ivar Raidam	(Estonia) Margus Karjane	Lada Samara 21083
1993	(Estonia) Ivar Raidam	(Estonia) Margus Karjane	Ford Escort RS Cosworth
1994	(Estonia) Ivar Raidam	(Estonia) Margus Karjane	Ford Escort RS Cosworth
1995	(Estonia) Ivar Raidam	(Estonia) Margus Karjane	Ford Escort RS Cosworth
1996	(Estonia) Ivar Raidam	(Estonia) Margus Karjane	Mitsubishi Lancer Evo III
1997	(Estonia) Markko Märtin	(Estonia) Toomas Kitsing	Toyota Celica Turbo 4WD
2001	(Estonia) Andrus Laur	(Estonia) Aleksander Kornilov	Ford Escort WRC
2002	(Estonia) Margus Murakas	(Estonia) Toomas Kitsing	Toyota Corolla WRC
2003	(Estonia) Margus Murakas	(Estonia) Toomas Kitsing	Ford Focus WRC 01
2006	(Estonia) Margus Murakas	(Estonia) Raul Markus	Toyota Corolla WRC
2008	(Estonia) Urmo Aava	(Estonia) Kuldar Sikk	Citroën C4 WRC
2009	(Estonia) Ott Tänak	(Estonia) Raigo Mõlder	Subaru Impreza STi N14
2016	(Estonia) Markko Märtin	(Estonia) Kristo Kraag	Ford Focus WRC 03
2017	(Estonia) Georg Gross	(Estonia) Raigo Mõlder	Ford Fiesta RS WRC
2018	(Estonia) Ranno Bundsen	(Estonia) Robert Loštšenikov	Mitsubishi Lancer Evo VIII
2019	(Estonia) Georg Gross	(Estonia) Raigo Mõlder	Ford Fiesta WRC
2020	(Estonia) Ott Tänak	(Estonia) Martin Järveoja	Hyundai i20 Coupe WRC
2021	(Estonia) Georg Gross	(Estonia) Raigo Mõlder	Ford Fiesta WRC
2022	(Estonia) Gregor Jeets	(Estonia) Timo Taniel	Škoda Fabia Rally2 evo
2023	(Estonia) Ott Tänak	(Estonia) Martin Järveoja	Ford Puma Rally1
2025	(Estonia) Ott Tänak	(Estonia) Martin Järveoja	Hyundai i20 N Rally1

=== Multiple winners ===
Wins	Driver	Years won
5	(Estonia) Ivar Raidam	1992, 1993, 1994, 1995, 1996
4	(Estonia) Ott Tänak	2009, 2020, 2023, 2025
3	(Estonia) Margus Murakas	2002, 2003, 2006
3	(Estonia) Georg Gross	2017, 2019, 2021
2	(Estonia) Markko Märtin	1997, 2016

Wins	Manufacturer
10	(United States) Ford
3	(Japan) Toyota
2	(Japan) Mitsubishi
2	(South Korea) Hyundai
