= 2015 World Rally Championship =

43rd season of the World Rally Championship

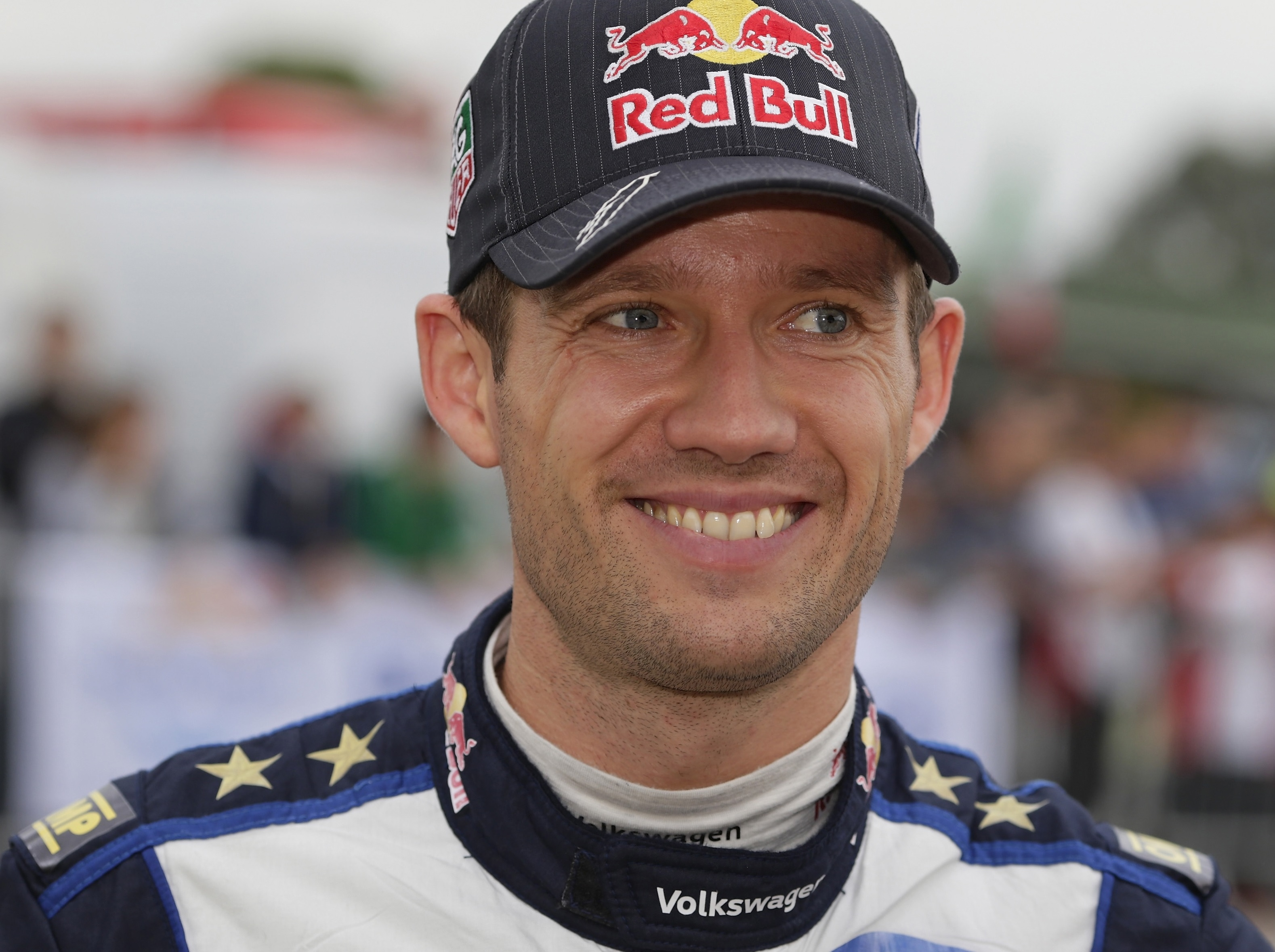
Sébastien Ogier successfully defended the drivers' title.

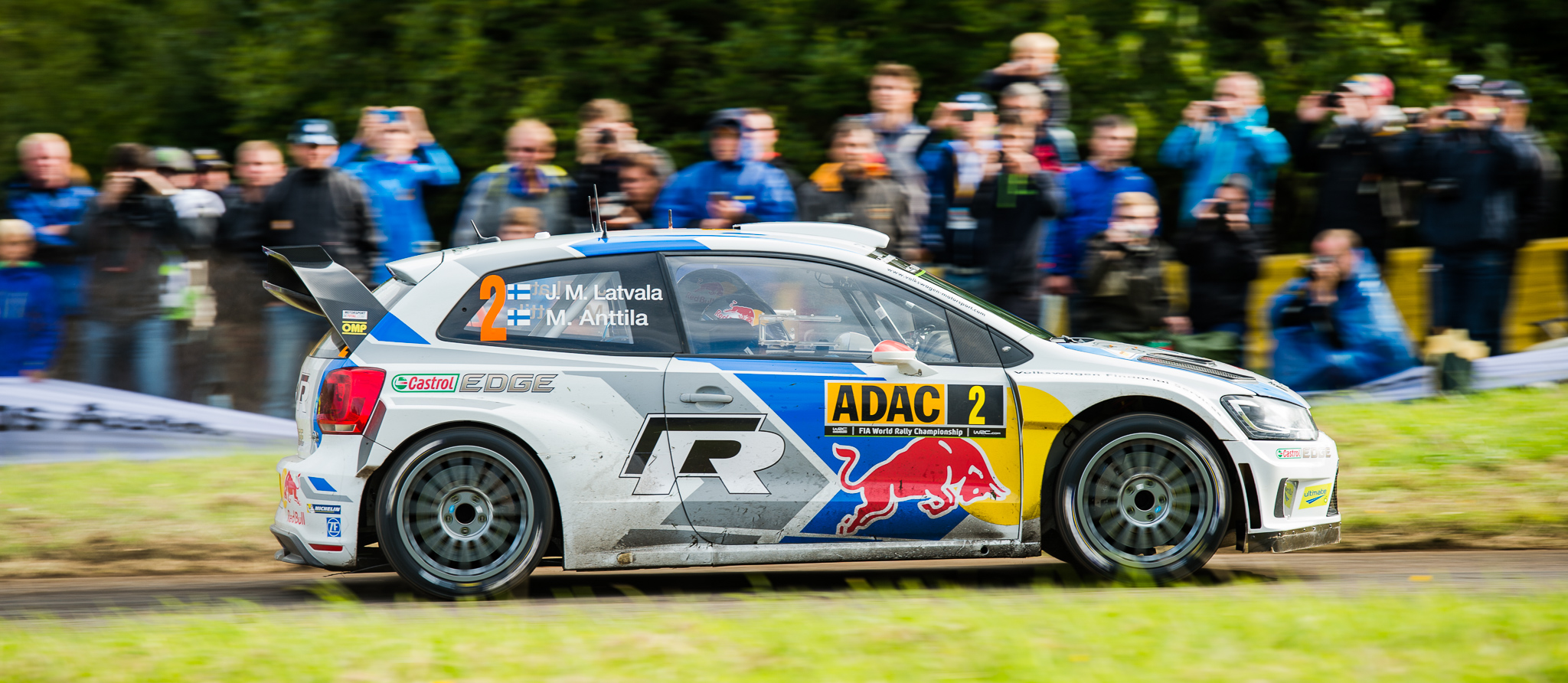
The Volkswagen Polo R WRC, car entered by Volkswagen Motorsport, who successfully defended manufacturers' title.

The 2015 FIA World Rally Championship was the 43rd season of the World Rally Championship, a rallying championship recognised by the Fédération Internationale de l'Automobile as the highest class of international rallying. Teams and drivers contest thirteen rallies across four continents, competing for the FIA World Rally Championships for Drivers and Manufacturers. The WRC-2, WRC-3 and Junior WRC championships are run in support of the premier championship.

Sébastien Ogier started the season as the defending drivers' champion. His team, Volkswagen Motorsport, were the defending manufacturers' champions. Both Ogier and Volkswagen Motorsport claimed their third consecutive drivers' and manufacturers' championships with 3 rounds to spare by winning in Rally Australia.

== Calendar ==
The 2015 calendar was announced at a meeting of the FIA World Motor Sport Council in Beijing in September 2014. The season maintained the same rallies as the 2014 season and was contested over thirteen rounds in Europe, the Americas and Oceania.

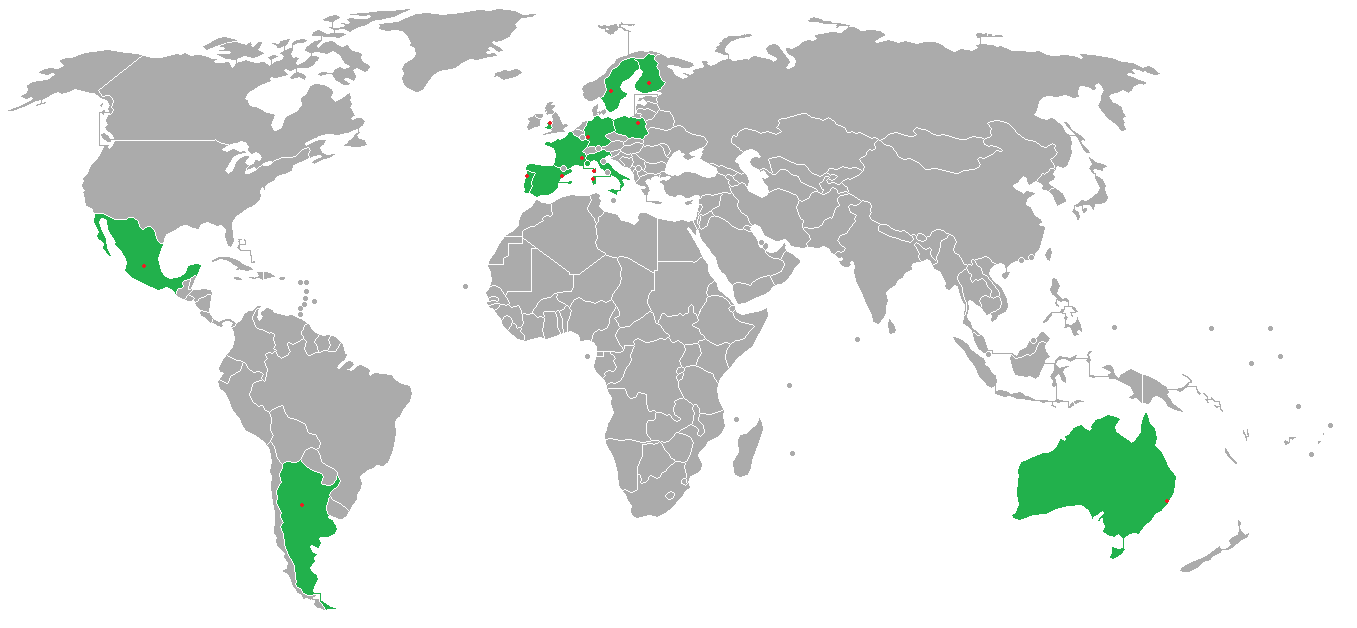
A map showing the locations of the rallies in the 2015 season

Round	Dates	Rally name	Rally headquarters	Surface
1	22–25 January	(Monaco) Monte Carlo Rally	Gap, Hautes-Alpes, France	Mixed
2	13–15 February	Rally Sweden	Hagfors, Värmland	Snow
3	6–8 March	Rally Mexico	León, Guanajuato	Gravel
4	24–26 April	Rally Argentina	Villa Carlos Paz, Córdoba	Gravel
5	22–24 May	Rally de Portugal	Matosinhos, Porto	Gravel
6	12–14 June	(Italy) Rally Italia Sardegna	Alghero, Sardinia	Gravel
7	3–5 July	Rally Poland	Mikołajki, Warmia-Masuria	Gravel
8	31 July–2 August	Rally Finland	Jyväskylä, Keski-Suomi	Gravel
9	21–23 August	(Germany) Rallye Deutschland	Trier, Rhineland-Palatinate	Tarmac
10	11–13 September	Rally Australia	Coffs Harbour, New South Wales	Gravel
11	2–4 October	(France) Tour de Corse	Ajaccio, Corse-du-Sud	Tarmac
12	23–25 October	(Spain) Rally de Catalunya	Salou, Tarragona	Mixed
13	13–15 November	(United Kingdom) Wales Rally GB	Deeside, Flintshire	Gravel

Notes:

- ^1 — The Rallies of Germany and France were provisional inclusions subject to negotiation of a new agreement between their organisers and series promoters.

=== Calendar changes ===
- The Rallye Monte Carlo adopted Rally-2 regulations, allowing retired competitors to restart the event the next day with a time penalty. Prior to 2015, the Rallye Monte Carlo was the only event being run without Rally-2 regulations.
- The Rally de Portugal and Rally Argentina swapped places in the calendar.
- The Rally of Portugal moved from its base in the town of Faro in the Algarve region—where it had been headquartered from 2007 until 2014—and relocated to the country's north, its original home prior until its removal from the calendar in 2002.
- On 6 February 2015, the Fédération Française du Sport Automobile (FFSA) announced that the Tour de Corse would replace the Rallye de France Alsace on the calendar for financial reasons.

== Teams and drivers ==
The following teams and drivers are scheduled to compete in the World Rally Championship during the 2015 season:

World Rally Car entries eligible to score manufacturer points
Manufacturer	Car	Entrant	Tyre	No.	Drivers	Co-drivers	Rounds
Volkswagen	Volkswagen Polo R WRC	(Germany) Volkswagen Motorsport	M	1	(France) Sébastien Ogier	(France) Julien Ingrassia	All
Volkswagen	Volkswagen Polo R WRC	(Germany) Volkswagen Motorsport	M	2	(Finland) Jari-Matti Latvala	(Finland) Miikka Anttila	All
Volkswagen	Volkswagen Polo R WRC	(Germany) Volkswagen Motorsport II	M	9	(Norway) Andreas Mikkelsen	(Norway) Ola Fløene	2, 4–13
Citroën	Citroën DS3 WRC	(France) Citroën Total Abu Dhabi World Rally Team	M	3	(United Kingdom) Kris Meeke	(Republic of Ireland) Paul Nagle	All
Citroën	Citroën DS3 WRC	(France) Citroën Total Abu Dhabi World Rally Team	M	4	(France) Sébastien Loeb	(Monaco) Daniel Elena	1
Citroën	Citroën DS3 WRC	(France) Citroën Total Abu Dhabi World Rally Team	M	4	(Norway) Mads Østberg	(Sweden) Jonas Andersson	2–9, 11–13
Citroën	Citroën DS3 WRC	(France) Citroën Total Abu Dhabi World Rally Team	M	4	(France) Stéphane Lefebvre	(Belgium) Stéphane Prevot	10
Ford	Ford Fiesta RS WRC	(United Kingdom) M-Sport World Rally Team	M	5	(United Kingdom) Elfyn Evans	(United Kingdom) Daniel Barritt	All
Ford	Ford Fiesta RS WRC	(United Kingdom) M-Sport World Rally Team	M	6	(Estonia) Ott Tänak	(Estonia) Raigo Mõlder	All
Ford	Ford Fiesta RS WRC	(Czech Republic) Jipocar Czech National Team	P	21	(Czech Republic) Martin Prokop	(Czech Republic) Jan Tománek	1–9, 11–13
Ford	Ford Fiesta RS WRC	(Italy) FWRT s.r.l.	P	37	(Italy) Lorenzo Bertelli	(Italy) Giovanni Bernacchini	1–5
Ford	Ford Fiesta RS WRC	(Italy) FWRT s.r.l.	P	37	(Italy) Lorenzo Bertelli	(Italy) Lorenzo Granai	6–13
Hyundai	Hyundai i20 WRC	(South Korea) Hyundai Motorsport	M	7	(Belgium) Thierry Neuville	(Belgium) Nicolas Gilsoul	1–12
Hyundai	Hyundai i20 WRC	(South Korea) Hyundai Motorsport	M	7	(Spain) Dani Sordo	(Spain) Marc Martí	13
Hyundai	Hyundai i20 WRC	(South Korea) Hyundai Motorsport	M	8	(Spain) Dani Sordo	(Spain) Marc Martí	1, 3–9, 11–12
Hyundai	Hyundai i20 WRC	(South Korea) Hyundai Motorsport	M	8	(New Zealand) Hayden Paddon	(New Zealand) John Kennard	2, 10, 13
Hyundai	Hyundai i20 WRC	(South Korea) Hyundai Motorsport N	M	20	(Netherlands) Kevin Abbring	(United Kingdom) Sebastian Marshall	2
Hyundai	Hyundai i20 WRC	(South Korea) Hyundai Motorsport N	M	20	(New Zealand) Hayden Paddon	(New Zealand) John Kennard	3–9, 11–12
Hyundai	Hyundai i20 WRC	(South Korea) Hyundai Motorsport N	M	20	(Spain) Dani Sordo	(Spain) Marc Martí	10
Hyundai	Hyundai i20 WRC	(South Korea) Hyundai Motorsport N	M	20	(Belgium) Thierry Neuville	(Belgium) Nicolas Gilsoul	13

World Rally Car entries ineligible to score manufacturer points
Manufacturer	Car	Entrant	Tyre	Drivers	Co-drivers	Rounds
Citroën	Citroën DS3 WRC	(France) Citroën Total Abu Dhabi World Rally Team	M	(Norway) Mads Østberg	(Sweden) Jonas Andersson	1
Citroën	Citroën DS3 WRC	(France) Citroën Total Abu Dhabi World Rally Team	M	(United Arab Emirates) Khalid Al Qassimi	(United Kingdom) Chris Patterson	4–6, 8, 12
Citroën	Citroën DS3 WRC	(France) Citroën Total Abu Dhabi World Rally Team	M	(France) Stéphane Lefebvre	(Belgium) Stéphane Prevot	9, 11, 13
Citroën	Citroën DS3 WRC	(France) PH Sport	M	(France) Stéphane Lefebvre	(Belgium) Stéphane Prevot	12
Citroën	Citroën DS3 WRC	(France) PH Sport	M	(France) Sébastien Chardonnet	(France) Thibault De La Haye	1
Citroën	Citroën DS3 WRC	(Italy) D-Max Racing	P	(Ukraine) Yuriy Protasov	(Ukraine) Pavlo Cherepin	1
Ford	Ford Fiesta RS WRC	(United Kingdom) M-Sport World Rally Team	M	(France) Bryan Bouffier	(France) Xavier Panseri	1
Ford	Ford Fiesta RS WRC	(United Kingdom) M-Sport World Rally Team	M	(France) Bryan Bouffier	(France) Thibault De La Haye	11
Ford	Ford Fiesta RS WRC	(United Kingdom) M-Sport World Rally Team	M	(Finland) Juho Hänninen	(Finland) Tomi Tuominen	8
Ford	Ford Fiesta RS WRC	(United Kingdom) M-Sport World Rally Team	P	(Ukraine) Yuriy Protasov	(Ukraine) Pavlo Cherepin	2
Ford	Ford Fiesta RS WRC	(United Kingdom) M-Sport World Rally Team	P	(Russia) Alexey Lukyanuk	(Russia) Alexey Arnautov	8
Ford	Ford Fiesta RS WRC	(Poland) RK World Rally Team	P	(Poland) Robert Kubica	(Poland) Maciek Szczepaniak	1–9, 11–13
Ford	Ford Fiesta RS WRC	(Norway) Adapta Motorsport	M	(Norway) Henning Solberg	(Austria) Ilka Minor	1–2, 8, 13
Ford	Ford Fiesta RS WRC	(Italy) GP Racing Team	M	(France) Jean-Michel Raoux	(France) Thomas Escartefigue	1
Ford	Ford Fiesta RS WRC	(Poland) Synthos Cersanit Rally Team	P	(Poland) Michał Sołowow	(Poland) Maciek Baran	2
Ford	Ford Fiesta RS WRC	(Italy) Motorsport Italia	P	(Mexico) Benito Guerra	(Spain) Borja Rozada	3
Ford	Ford Fiesta RS WRC	(United Kingdom) Graham Coffey Rally Team	P	(United Kingdom) Graham Coffey	(Germany) Jenny Gäbler	9
Ford	Ford Fiesta RS WRC	(Czech Republic) Jipocar Czech National Team	P	(Slovakia) Jaroslav Melichárek	(Slovakia) Erik Melichárek	9
Ford	Ford Fiesta RS WRC	(Belgium) First Motorsport	M	(France) Stéphane Sarrazin	(France) Jacques-Julien Renucci	11
Ford	Ford Fiesta RS WRC	(Republic of Ireland) Combilift Rallying	P	(Republic of Ireland) Josh Moffett	(Republic of Ireland) John Rowan	13
Ford	Ford Fiesta RS WRC	(Republic of Ireland) Combilift Rallying	P	(Republic of Ireland) Sam Moffett	(Republic of Ireland) Karl Atkinson	13
Hyundai	Hyundai i20 WRC	(South Korea) Hyundai Motorsport N	M	(Netherlands) Kevin Abbring	(United Kingdom) Sebastian Marshall	7, 9, 11, 13
Volkswagen	Volkswagen Polo R WRC	(Germany) Volkswagen Motorsport II	M	(Norway) Andreas Mikkelsen	(Norway) Ola Fløene	1, 3

=== Driver changes ===
- Mikko Hirvonen retired from rallying at the World Championship at the end of the 2014 season. His place was taken by Ott Tänak, who returned to the World Rally Championship after a season in the sport's second-tier category, WRC2.
- Nine-time World Champion Sébastien Loeb returned to the series for the Monte Carlo Rally, competing in a Citroën DS3 WRC with the Citroën World Rally Team. Mads Østberg remains with the team, driving a non-manufacturer DS3 in Monte Carlo before taking over from Loeb later in the season.

== Changes ==
=== Regulation changes ===
- Competitors who fail to contest a special stage without being able to show cause receive a seven-minute time penalty.
- Selected rounds of the 2015 season are included in the newly created FIA R-GT Cup—with the remaining rounds taken from the European Rally Championship calendar—for Grand Touring cars entered under Group R-GT regulations.
- The running order is in championship order for the first two legs of the rally. On the last leg, P1 and P2 crews run in reverse classification order.
- The transmission of performance data or information to or from a competing car, not in relation with safety, is forbidden during special stages to help promote greater competition.
- A car which has not started from the start line within 20 seconds will be considered as retired and will be able to restart under Rally 2 on the subsequent day.

== Rally summaries ==
=== Round 1 — Monte Carlo Rally ===
Round	Rally name	Podium finishers					Statistics			
Round	Rally name	Pos.	No.	Driver	Team	Time	Stages	Length	Starters	Finishers
1	(Monaco) Monte Carlo Rally (22–25 January) — Results and report	1	1	(France) Sébastien Ogier (France) Julien Ingrassia	(Germany) Volkswagen Motorsport (Volkswagen Polo R WRC)	3:36:40.2	(15)^{1a} 14	(355.48 km)^{1b} 335.55 km	94	78
1	(Monaco) Monte Carlo Rally (22–25 January) — Results and report	2	2	(Finland) Jari-Matti Latvala (Finland) Miikka Anttila	(Germany) Volkswagen Motorsport (Volkswagen Polo R WRC)	3:37:38.2	(15)^{1a} 14	(355.48 km)^{1b} 335.55 km	94	78
1	(Monaco) Monte Carlo Rally (22–25 January) — Results and report	3	9	(Norway) Andreas Mikkelsen (Norway) Ola Fløene	(Germany) Volkswagen Motorsport II (Volkswagen Polo R WRC)	3:38:52.5	(15)^{1a} 14	(355.48 km)^{1b} 335.55 km	94	78

Defending World Champion Sébastien Ogier started the season with a win in Monte Carlo, his second consecutive in the principality and the 25th of his WRC career. Returning nine-time World Champion Sébastien Loeb was the early leader of the rally, losing first position to Ogier on the seventh stage after a spin while negotiating a hairpin bend. On the next stage, Loeb hit a rock and lost a total of six minutes, before retiring in the following liaison section. This gave Ogier a lead of almost two minutes over Volkswagen teammate Jari-Matti Latvala. Despite being unable to monitor his rivals' split times during the stages under new rules, Ogier blended a controlled pace with safe tyre choices through the final two days to seal the victory. Latvala finished second, also taking one power stage point, with Andreas Mikkelsen completing a one-two-three for Volkswagen Motorsport. Citroën's Mads Østberg finished the event in fourth position. Hyundai Motorsport duo Thierry Neuville and Dani Sordo finished in fifth and sixth, split by 0.8 seconds. M-Sport's Elfyn Evans finished seventh, having dropped time after he damaged his car's rear suspension against a wall. Evans finished ahead of Loeb, who rejoined under rally-2 rules and won two power stage points. The top ten was completed by Martin Prokop and Kris Meeke, who won the power stage to take three additional points.

=== Round 2 — Rally Sweden ===
Round	Rally name	Podium finishers					Statistics			
Round	Rally name	Pos.	No.	Driver	Team	Time	Stages	Length	Starters	Finishers
2	Rally Sweden (12–15 February) — Results and report	1	1	(France) Sébastien Ogier (France) Julien Ingrassia	(Germany) Volkswagen Motorsport (Volkswagen Polo R WRC)	2:55:30.5	21	308.00 km	44	40
2	Rally Sweden (12–15 February) — Results and report	2	7	(Belgium) Thierry Neuville (Belgium) Nicolas Gilsoul	(South Korea) Hyundai Motorsport (Hyundai i20 WRC)	2:55:36.9	21	308.00 km	44	40
2	Rally Sweden (12–15 February) — Results and report	3	9	(Norway) Andreas Mikkelsen (Norway) Ola Fløene	(Germany) Volkswagen Motorsport II (Volkswagen Polo R WRC)	2:56:10.3	21	308.00 km	44	40

Sébastien Ogier won the rally on the last stage to extend his lead in the drivers' championship. The rally started with Pontus Tidemand, competing in a WRC2 Ford Fiesta RRC, winning the Thursday night super special stage in Karlstad. Ogier took the lead on Friday's opening stage, with teammate Jari-Matti Latvala chasing him for the lead. Volkswagen's third driver, Andreas Mikkelsen gained the lead on the ninth stage, after Ogier and Latvala both hit snow banks, dropping to 4th and 23rd respectively. Mikkelsen kept the lead until Saturday's final stage, where Hyundai's Thierry Neuville took the lead after fitting new tyres for the stage; Mikkelsen and Ogier were both in contention however, at deficits of 1.5 and 9.6 seconds respectively. Mikkelsen regained the lead on Sunday's opening stage, and held a three-second lead over Ogier ahead of the final stage, Värmullsåsen, which was also the event's power stage, offering additional drivers' championship points.

Running in reverse order to their rally positions, Ogier bested Neuville's time for the stage – ultimately, the stage's fastest time – and just after he completed the stage, Mikkelsen hit a snow bank and lost 40 seconds to fall behind Neuville in the standings as well. Ott Tänak finished fourth to record his best WRC result since 2012, while Hayden Paddon recorded his best WRC finish – replacing the injured Dani Sordo – in fifth position. Next in the order was British duo Elfyn Evans and Kris Meeke, Martin Prokop finished eighth ahead of Yuriy Protasov, who took his first WRC stage win, on the Kirkenær stage. Completing the championship points was Mads Østberg, who was in position for a podium spot, until he hit a snow bank on the eleventh stage. He also scored an extra point by finishing third on the power stage. After the last stage, Volkswagen Motorsport decided to retire Latvala's car – he had managed to recover up the order to 12th place – due to a rules loophole in relation to the following event, Rally México.

=== Round 3 — Rally Mexico ===
Round	Rally name	Podium finishers					Statistics			
Round	Rally name	Pos.	No.	Driver	Team	Time	Stages	Length	Starters	Finishers
3	Rally Mexico (6–9 March) — Results and report	1	1	(France) Sébastien Ogier (France) Julien Ingrassia	(Germany) Volkswagen Motorsport (Volkswagen Polo R WRC)	4:19:13.4	21	394.21 km	30	23
3	Rally Mexico (6–9 March) — Results and report	2	4	(Norway) Mads Østberg (Sweden) Jonas Andersson	(France) Citroën Total Abu Dhabi World Rally Team (Citroën DS3 WRC)	4:20:32.2	21	394.21 km	30	23
3	Rally Mexico (6–9 March) — Results and report	3	9	(Norway) Andreas Mikkelsen (Norway) Ola Fløene	(Germany) Volkswagen Motorsport II (Volkswagen Polo R WRC)	4:20:38.5	21	394.21 km	30	23

Sébastien Ogier began the event by winning the shakedown, before the rally proper opened with a night-time special stage in the tunnels of Guanajuato city, a World Heritage Site as denoted by UNESCO. Thierry Neuville became the first leader of the event by winning the stage, in front of Lorenzo Bertelli.

The second day of the event began with the first gravel section of the 2015 season, where Ogier took the opportunity to jump into the lead despite having the difficult task of sweeping the roads; he had been doing so as the championship leader. On the third stage, Ott Tänak lost control of his Ford Fiesta RS WRC and left the road, with his car falling into a reservoir. Tänak and co-driver Raigo Mõlder managed to evacuate the car before it submerged. Kris Meeke, who won the stage that Tänak crashed out on, crashed out of the rally on the following stage, irreversibly damaging his Citroën DS3 WRC. The morning also saw the retirements of Robert Kubica and Hayden Paddon.

Thierry Neuville was driving quickly in second overall when he crashed on the eighth stage, leaving Jari-Matti Latvala in second position at the end of the second day. Tänak's car was recovered from the reservoir, and the M-Sport World Rally Team were able to repair the car for use the next day. However, the car failed just after leaving service, and the car was retired for the day. Tänak did compete on the final trio of stages and was able to finish the rally in 22nd overall. On the final day, Latvala started in pursuit of Ogier, but he would ultimately finish 15th overall after broken suspension caused damage to a rear wheel. Ogier ultimately won his fifth successive rally, collecting maximum points with a power stage win. The fight for second place was between Mads Østberg and Andreas Mikkelsen, with Østberg prevailing by 6.3 seconds. Elfyn Evans matched his best WRC result in fourth, in front of Hyundai's Dani Sordo, returning from injury.

=== Round 4 — Rally Argentina ===
Round	Rally name	Podium finishers					Statistics			
Round	Rally name	Pos.	No.	Driver	Team	Time	Stages	Length	Starters	Finishers
4	Rally Argentina (23–26 April) — Results and report	1	3	(United Kingdom) Kris Meeke (Republic of Ireland) Paul Nagle	(France) Citroën Total Abu Dhabi WRT (Citroën DS3 WRC)	3:41:44.9	(12)^{2a} 11	(315,86 km)^{2b} 292,81 km	60	26
4	Rally Argentina (23–26 April) — Results and report	2	4	(Norway) Mads Østberg (Sweden) Jonas Andersson	(France) Citroën Total Abu Dhabi WRT (Citroën DS3 WRC)	3:42:03.0	(12)^{2a} 11	(315,86 km)^{2b} 292,81 km	60	26
4	Rally Argentina (23–26 April) — Results and report	3	6	(United Kingdom) Elfyn Evans (United Kingdom) Daniel Barritt	(United Kingdom) M-Sport World Rally Team (Ford Fiesta WRC)	3:45:12.3	(12)^{2a} 11	(315,86 km)^{2b} 292,81 km	60	26

Kris Meeke won a WRC rally for the first time in his career, the first time a British driver had won a WRC event since the 2002 World Rally Championship season Safari Rally, which was won by Colin McRae. Meeke dedicated the victory to McRae, who had been his mentor.

This event was the first time Citroën had won a rally since (2013 Rallye Deutschland), and the first one-two since 2012 Rally Finland, as Mads Østberg finished second. Elfyn Evans, in a Ford Fiesta WRC, took the first podium of his career. This event was the first time Volkswagen hadn't finished on the podium since their return to the WRC.

The rally was notable for its high level of attrition; only five World Rally Cars finished the event without experiencing mechanical problems. The second stage saw double world champion Sébastien Ogier stop with an injector problem, whilst Lorenzo Bertelli also retired on this stage. On the following stages, Andreas Mikkelsen and Hayden Paddon both experienced technical problems, with both drivers restarting on the following day. Ott Tänak lost a wheel on the fourth stage, but also restarted on the following day. On the second day, Paddon crashed out on the ninth stage, whilst Dani Sordo stopped with power steering problems on the following stage; both drivers restarted on the final day. On the final day, Jari-Matti Latvala suffered an engine failure on the eleventh stage, whilst Mikkelsen and Thierry Neuville both crashed in the same place on the final stage. Østberg had also experienced engine problems on the opening stage, but was able to recover to second.

Ogier won the power stage on the way to finishing 17th overall; Sordo was second on the power stage, as he recovered to fifth, and Østberg finished third.

=== Round 5 — Rally de Portugal ===
Round	Rally name	Podium finishers					Statistics			
Round	Rally name	Pos.	No.	Driver	Team	Time	Stages	Length	Starters	Finishers
5	Rally de Portugal (21–24 May) — Results and report	1	2	(Finland) Jari-Matti Latvala (Finland) Miikka Anttila	(Germany) Volkswagen Motorsport (Volkswagen Polo R WRC)	3:30:35.3	(16)^{3a} 15	(351,71 km)^{3b} 324,18 km	94	64
5	Rally de Portugal (21–24 May) — Results and report	2	1	(France) Sébastien Ogier (France) Julien Ingrassia	(Germany) Volkswagen Motorsport (Volkswagen Polo R WRC)	3:30:43.5	(16)^{3a} 15	(351,71 km)^{3b} 324,18 km	94	64
5	Rally de Portugal (21–24 May) — Results and report	3	9	(Norway) Andreas Mikkelsen (Norway) Ola Fløene	(Germany) Volkswagen Motorsport II (Volkswagen Polo R WRC)	3:31:03.9	(16)^{3a} 15	(351,71 km)^{3b} 324,18 km	94	64

14 years later, the Rally de Portugal returned to be held in the North of the country, returning to the sections that earned it the World Best Rally award for 6 times, and the people joined massively.

The race began with the return of the mythical Special Stage at Lousada racing track, with 15,000 spectators. As in the shakedown, Andreas Mikkelsen was the fastest, followed by Sébastien Ogier and Jari-Matti Latvala. Robert Kubica took the all-new Ford Fiesta RS WRC (premiered by M-Sport at Rally of Portugal) to 4th place.

On the second day of the race, the competition played in the Minho Province, with the section of Caminha proving to be quite hard, causing several dropouts and mechanical breakdowns. Ogier on WRC leader condition had the difficult task of opening the road, had a flat tyre right at the SS 2 and finished the day in 2nd overall. At the end of the SS 5 (2nd passage through Ponte de Lima was canceled due to a forest fire) Latvala was the leader with 11.1 seconds ahead of Kris Meeke, and 16 s on Mikelsen. Sordo, winner of the first special of the day (SS 2) was only 5th.

On Saturday, Ogier regained some handicap, winning the second day passes and finished the third day on 2nd place 9.5 seconds behind the leader, Latvala. Meeke won two of the SS and was 3rd, 20 s behind the leader but had Mikelsen (who won the other SS) at just 1.1 s. Elfyn Evans left after the first SS (as in the previous day) with electrical problems in the Ford Fiesta RS WRC, while Tänak and Sordo, already at more than a minute behind the lead were out of the fight for a podium finish. Neuville overturned and Ostberg suffered engine problems in his Citroën.

The title decision was reserved for Sunday, with the dispute of the mythical passages of Fafe (2 passes, with the second being the power-stage) and Cabreira (the longest of the rally with 32 km, now called the "Vieira do Minho" ). On the first pass by Fafe, and benefiting from a better position on the road, Ogier took 1.7 s the downside to Latvala, but at Serra da Cabreira Latvala responded and increased the advantage to 10.4 s. Mikelsen Volkswagen closed the podium. In the decisive power-stage, Ogier recovered 2.2 s at Latvala, insufficient to prevent the Finn to celebrate the triumph.

=== Round 6 — Rally Italia Sardegna ===
Round	Rally name	Podium finishers					Statistics			
Round	Rally name	Pos.	No.	Driver	Team	Time	Stages	Length	Starters	Finishers
6	(Italy) Rally Italia Sardegna (11–14 June) — Results and report	1	1	(France) Sébastien Ogier (France) Julien Ingrassia	(Germany) Volkswagen Motorsport (Volkswagen Polo R WRC)	4:25:54.3	23	394,63 km	53	41
6	(Italy) Rally Italia Sardegna (11–14 June) — Results and report	2	20	(New Zealand) Hayden Paddon (New Zealand) John Kennard	(South Korea) Hyundai Motorsport N (Hyundai i20 WRC)	4:28:59.7	23	394,63 km	53	41
6	(Italy) Rally Italia Sardegna (11–14 June) — Results and report	3	7	(Belgium) Thierry Neuville (Belgium) Nicolas Gilsoul	(South Korea) Hyundai Motorsport (Hyundai i20 WRC)	4:30:16.8	23	394,63 km	53	41

The rally began with a surprising Martin Prokop winning the Super Special Stage of Cagliari, followed by Dani Sordo (penalized for false start) and Mikkelsen. On the second day, new surprise with Hayden Paddon winning the first Friday 3 sections, and at the end of SS 4 led the rally with 25.3 s lead over Latvala and Ogier on 27.5. In the remaining stages, Paddon controlled the pace, but a slight touch on the last stage reduced the advantage to only 8.8 s, now on Ogier who had exceeded his teammate. Dani Sordo was forced to leave after booting a wheel while Neuville suffered from problems such as turbo and handbrake and finished 6th. Meeke gave-up at SS 2 and Kubica did the same on the next.

It was necessary to reach the SS 17 and a spinning from Paddon for a VW take the rally lead. Ostberg was third, despite having traveled 20 km with a slow tyre leakage, having won 2 PEC before having new slow tyre leakage in the last SS. In this day Mikkelsen (lost a wheel) Sordo (lack of gas pressure), Kubica (3 holes and a stuck gearbox) and Tänak (gearbox jammed when he was 3rd place) dropped out while there were many hardships to Neuville (whipping-top, turbo and steering problems and 40s penalty) and Latvala (hole and crashed shock absorber for 2 sections). At the end of the day Ogier had a huge advantage over Paddon (2m13s) while Ostberg was 3 to 3m25s and Neuville 4th at 3m57s.

For the last day the attention was concentrated in the fight for the last podium spot between Ostberg and Neuville. An outwit from Ostberg (dropped to 5) delivered the 3rd to the Belgian. The power-stage was completely dominated by VW: Ogier, Latvala and Mikkelsen.

=== Round 7 — Rally Poland ===
Round	Rally name	Podium finishers					Statistics			
Round	Rally name	Pos.	No.	Driver	Team	Time	Stages	Length	Starters	Finishers
7	Rally Poland (2–5 July) — Results and report	1	1	(France) Sébastien Ogier (France) Julien Ingrassia	(Germany) Volkswagen Motorsport (Volkswagen Polo R WRC)	2:26:11.5	(19)^{4a} 18	(313,53 km)^{4b} 295,83 km	70	57
7	Rally Poland (2–5 July) — Results and report	2	9	(Norway) Andreas Mikkelsen (Norway) Ola Fløene	(Germany) Volkswagen Motorsport II (Volkswagen Polo R WRC)	2:26:23.4	(19)^{4a} 18	(313,53 km)^{4b} 295,83 km	70	57
7	Rally Poland (2–5 July) — Results and report	3	6	(Estonia) Ott Tänak (Estonia) Raigo Mõlder	(United Kingdom) M-Sport World Rally Team (Ford Fiesta WRC)	2:26:34.5	(19)^{4a} 18	(313,53 km)^{4b} 295,83 km	70	57

Yet in the shakedown, Kris Meeke had an accident that forced him to move on foot at the departure ceremony. Sebastien Ogier won the opening Super Special, followed by privates Robert Kubica and Martin Prokop. On the 2nd day Ott Tänak took the starting position (11th on the road) and won 3 sections. However, Ogier increased the pace, and benefiting from Tänak problems, was the leader at the end of SS 7. On the 3rd day, Ogier held the lead while Tänak pressed and passed Latvala to get the final podium spot behind Mikkelsen. Elfyn Evans abandoned with trouble in the water pump, Hayden Paddon was the best Hyundai while the Citroën were misplaced. On the last day, Mikkelsen still tried the win, but the podium positions did not change. Latvala lost fourth place already on the link for assistance park to Hayden Paddon, who was the best Hyundai, a race in which four cars of the South Korean brand ended.

=== Round 8 — Rally Finland ===
Round	Rally name	Podium finishers					Statistics			
Round	Rally name	Pos.	No.	Driver	Team	Time	Stages	Length	Starters	Finishers
8	Rally Finland (30 July–2 August) — Results and report	1	2	(Finland) Jari-Matti Latvala (Finland) Miikka Anttila	(Germany) Volkswagen Motorsport (Volkswagen Polo R WRC)	2:33:03.8	20	320,00 km	84	56
8	Rally Finland (30 July–2 August) — Results and report	2	1	(France) Sébastien Ogier (France) Julien Ingrassia	(Germany) Volkswagen Motorsport (Volkswagen Polo R WRC)	2:33:17.5	20	320,00 km	84	56
8	Rally Finland (30 July–2 August) — Results and report	3	4	(Norway) Mads Østberg (Sweden) Jonas Andersson	(France) Citroën Total Abu Dhabi World Rally Team (Citroën DS3 WRC)	2:34:40.6	20	320,00 km	84	56

Jari-Matti Latvala drove away from his teammate Sébastien Ogier. After the years 2010 and 2014 Latvala won his home rally for the third time. Meeke was holding the third place until he punctured on SS15. Mikkelsen and Paddon retired after crashes.

=== Round 9 — Rallye Deutschland ===
Round	Rally name	Podium finishers					Statistics			
Round	Rally name	Pos.	No.	Driver	Team	Time	Stages	Length	Starters	Finishers
9	(Germany) Rallye Deutschland (20–23 August) — Results and report	1	1	(France) Sébastien Ogier (France) Julien Ingrassia	(Germany) Volkswagen Motorsport (Volkswagen Polo R WRC)	3:35:49.5	21	374.43 km	75	56
9	(Germany) Rallye Deutschland (20–23 August) — Results and report	2	2	(Finland) Jari-Matti Latvala (Finland) Miikka Anttila	(Germany) Volkswagen Motorsport (Volkswagen Polo R WRC)	3:36:12.5	21	374.43 km	75	56
9	(Germany) Rallye Deutschland (20–23 August) — Results and report	3	9	(Norway) Andreas Mikkelsen (Norway) Ola Fløene	(Germany) Volkswagen Motorsport II (Volkswagen Polo R WRC)	3:37:46.1	21	374.43 km	75	56

Sébastien Ogier won in front of his teammate Jari-Matti Latvala and Andreas Mikkelsen. He made thus a further major step towards world title number three. For Volkswagen it was the third triple victory of the season.

=== Round 10 — Rally Australia ===
Round	Rally name	Podium finishers					Statistics			
Round	Rally name	Pos.	No.	Driver	Team	Time	Stages	Length	Starters	Finishers
10	Rally Australia (10–13 September) — Results and report	1	1	(France) Sébastien Ogier (France) Julien Ingrassia	(Germany) Volkswagen Motorsport (Volkswagen Polo R WRC)	2:59:16.4	17	311.36 km	26	22
10	Rally Australia (10–13 September) — Results and report	2	2	(Finland) Jari-Matti Latvala (Finland) Miikka Anttila	(Germany) Volkswagen Motorsport (Volkswagen Polo R WRC)	2:59:28.7	17	311.36 km	26	22
10	Rally Australia (10–13 September) — Results and report	3	3	(United Kingdom) Kris Meeke (Republic of Ireland) Paul Nagle	(France) Citroën Total Abu Dhabi World Rally Team (Citroën DS3 WRC)	2:59:49.0	17	311.36 km	26	22

The seventh rally win this year, Ogier after 2013 and 2014 also prematurely clinched the world champion title for 2015. Volkswagen won also its third Manufacturer Title in a row.

=== Round 11 — Tour de Corse ===
Round	Rally name	Podium finishers					Statistics			
Round	Rally name	Pos.	No.	Driver	Team	Time	Stages	Length	Starters	Finishers
11	(France) Tour de Corse (1–4 October) — Results and report	1	2	(Finland) Jari-Matti Latvala (Finland) Miikka Anttila	(Germany) Volkswagen Motorsport (Volkswagen Polo R WRC)	2:39:46.7	(9)^{5a} 7	(332,73 km)^{5b} 245,35 km	123	97
11	(France) Tour de Corse (1–4 October) — Results and report	2	5	(United Kingdom) Elfyn Evans (United Kingdom) Daniel Barritt	(United Kingdom) M-Sport World Rally Team (Ford Fiesta WRC)	2:40:29.8	(9)^{5a} 7	(332,73 km)^{5b} 245,35 km	123	97
11	(France) Tour de Corse (1–4 October) — Results and report	3	9	(Norway) Andreas Mikkelsen (Norway) Ola Fløene	(Germany) Volkswagen Motorsport II (Volkswagen Polo R WRC)	2:40:33.0	(9)^{5a} 7	(332,73 km)^{5b} 245,35 km	123	97

=== Round 12 — Rally Catalunya ===
Round	Rally name	Podium finishers					Statistics			
Round	Rally name	Pos.	No.	Driver	Team	Time	Stages	Length	Starters	Finishers
12	(Spain) Rally Catalunya (22–25 October) — Results and report	1	9	(Norway) Andreas Mikkelsen (Norway) Ola Fløene	(Germany) Volkswagen Motorsport II (Volkswagen Polo R WRC)	3:21:04.8	23	331,25 km	82	64
12	(Spain) Rally Catalunya (22–25 October) — Results and report	2	2	(Finland) Jari-Matti Latvala (Finland) Miikka Anttila	(Germany) Volkswagen Motorsport (Volkswagen Polo R WRC)	3:21:07.9	23	331,25 km	82	64
12	(Spain) Rally Catalunya (22–25 October) — Results and report	3	8	(Spain) Dani Sordo (Spain) Marc Martí	(South Korea) Hyundai Motorsport (Hyundai i20 WRC)	3:21:26.0	23	331,25 km	82	64

=== Round 13 — Wales Rally GB ===
Round	Rally name	Podium finishers					Statistics			
Round	Rally name	Pos.	No.	Driver	Team	Time	Stages	Length	Starters	Finishers
13	(United Kingdom) Wales Rally GB (12–15 November) — Results and report	1	1	(France) Sébastien Ogier (France) Julien Ingrassia	(Germany) Volkswagen Motorsport (Volkswagen Polo R WRC)	3:03:02.0	19	310.15 km	70	58
13	(United Kingdom) Wales Rally GB (12–15 November) — Results and report	2	3	(United Kingdom) Kris Meeke (Republic of Ireland) Paul Nagle	(France) Citroën Total Abu Dhabi World Rally Team (Citroën DS3 WRC)	3:03:28.0	19	310.15 km	70	58
13	(United Kingdom) Wales Rally GB (12–15 November) — Results and report	3	9	(Norway) Andreas Mikkelsen (Norway) Ola Fløene	(Germany) Volkswagen Motorsport II (Volkswagen Polo R WRC)	3:03:38.2	19	310.15 km	70	58

Notes

- ^1 – The Monte Carlo Rally was shortened, as overcrowding caused the ninth stage to be cancelled for safety reasons.
- ^2 – The Rally Argentina was shortened after Hayden Paddon's accident in the ninth stage in which six spectators were injured.
- ^3 – The Rally de Portugal was shortened after a forest fire caused the cancellation of the fifth stage.
- ^4 – The Rally Poland was shortened after the fourteenth stage was cancelled due to large crowds not responding to safety crews instructions.
- ^5 – The Tour De Corse was shortened after a flood that damaged the roads caused the cancellation of the second and fourth stage.

== Results and standings ==
=== FIA World Rally Championship for Drivers ===
Points are awarded to the top ten classified finishers. There are also three bonus points awarded to the winner of the Power stage, two points for second place and one for third.

Position	1st	2nd	3rd	4th	5th	6th	7th	8th	9th	10th
Points	25	18	15	12	10	8	6	4	2	1

Pos.	Driver	MON (Monaco)	SWE (Sweden)	MEX (Mexico)	ARG (Argentina)	POR (Portugal)	ITA (Italy)	POL (Poland)	FIN (Finland)	GER (Germany)	AUS (Australia)	FRA (France)	ESP (Spain)	GBR (United Kingdom)	Points
1	(France) Sébastien Ogier	1	1^{1}	1^{1}	17^{1}	2^{1}	1^{1}	1^{1}	2^{1}	1	1^{1}	15^{1}	Ret	1	263
2	(Finland) Jari-Matti Latvala	2^{3}	Ret	15	Ret	1^{2}	6^{2}	5	1^{2}	2^{1}	2^{2}	1^{3}	2^{2}	50^{1}	183
3	(Norway) Andreas Mikkelsen	3	3	3^{2}	Ret	3^{3}	36^{3}	2^{3}	Ret	3	4^{3}	3	1^{1}	3^{2}	171
4	(Norway) Mads Østberg	4	10^{3}	2	2^{3}	7	5	9	3	7	WD	6	4	7	116
5	(United Kingdom) Kris Meeke	10^{1}	7	16	1	4	24	7	17^{3}	12^{2}	3	4	5^{3}	2	112
6	(Belgium) Thierry Neuville	5	2^{2}	8^{3}	Ret	38	3	6	4	5	7	23	8	Ret	90
7	(United Kingdom) Elfyn Evans	7	6	4	3	64	4	50	12	6	9	2	34	6	89
8	(Spain) Dani Sordo	6	WD	5	5^{2}	6	20	10	11	4^{3}	8	7	3	4	89
9	(New Zealand) Hayden Paddon		5	17	16	8	2	4	Ret	9	5	5	6	5	84
10	(Estonia) Ott Tänak	18	4	22	10	5	14	3^{2}	5	8	6	10	41	Ret	63
11	(Czech Republic) Martin Prokop	9	8	6	4	10	Ret	11	7	Ret		12	7	21	39
12	(Poland) Robert Kubica	Ret	20	18		9	30	8	Ret	35		22^{2}	11	9^{3}	11
13	(United Arab Emirates) Khalid Al Qassimi				6	24	10		16				15		9
14	(Finland) Juho Hänninen								6						8
15	(Ukraine) Yuriy Protasov	16	9	13	13		7		13	15	11	20	14	37	8
16	(Qatar) Nasser Al-Attiyah			7		11	12	Ret		17	10		12		7
17	(Qatar) Abdulaziz Al-Kuwari			11	7	16	11				12		23	16	6
18	(France) Sébastien Loeb	8^{2}													6
19	(France) Stéphane Lefebvre	12	Ret	Ret	Ret	15	26	Ret	EX	10	13	11	50	8	5
20	(Finland) Esapekka Lappi					12	17	12	8	42		14	Ret		4
21	(Paraguay) Diego Domínguez				8										4
22	(Italy) Paolo Andreucci						8								4
23	(France) Bryan Bouffier	Ret								Ret		8			4
24	(Sweden) Pontus Tidemand		17			13		13	9			Ret	9	WD	4
25	(Czech Republic) Jan Kopecký						9			13			10	WD	3
26	(France) Stéphane Sarrazin											9			2
27	(Peru) Nicolás Fuchs			9	Ret	17	15	20	Ret					18	2
28	(Paraguay) Gustavo Saba				9										2
29	(Italy) Lorenzo Bertelli	68	Ret	Ret	19	Ret	Ret	16	10	DNS	18	Ret	Ret	10	2
30	(Finland) Jari Ketomaa		13	10	12	Ret		17					36	WD	1
Pos.	Driver	MON (Monaco)	SWE (Sweden)	MEX (Mexico)	ARG (Argentina)	POR (Portugal)	ITA (Italy)	POL (Poland)	FIN (Finland)	GER (Germany)	AUS (Australia)	FRA (France)	ESP (Spain)	GBR (United Kingdom)	Points

Key
Colour	Result
Gold	Winner
Silver	2nd place
Bronze	3rd place
Green	Points finish
Blue	Non-points finish
Blue	Non-classified finish (NC)
Purple	Did not finish (Ret)
Black	Excluded (EX)
Black	Disqualified (DSQ)
White	Did not start (DNS)
White	Cancelled (C)
Blank	Withdrew entry from the event (WD)

Notes:
^{1 2 3} – Indicate position on Power stage

- – Ott Tänak finished 11th in the Argentine
  rally, but was credited with one championship
  point because the driver who finished 10th
  was ineligible for championship points.

=== FIA World Rally Championship for Co-Drivers ===
Points are awarded to the top ten classified finishers. There are also three bonus points awarded to the winner of the Power stage, two points for second place and one for third.

Position	1st	2nd	3rd	4th	5th	6th	7th	8th	9th	10th
Points	25	18	15	12	10	8	6	4	2	1

Pos.	Co-driver	MON (Monaco)	SWE (Sweden)	MEX (Mexico)	ARG (Argentina)	POR (Portugal)	ITA (Italy)	POL (Poland)	FIN (Finland)	GER (Germany)	AUS (Australia)	FRA (France)	ESP (Spain)	GBR (United Kingdom)	Points
1	(France) Julien Ingrassia	1	1^{1}	1^{1}	17^{1}	2^{1}	1^{1}	1^{1}	2^{1}	1	1^{1}	15^{1}	Ret	1	263
2	(Finland) Miikka Anttila	2^{3}	Ret	15	Ret	1^{2}	6^{2}	5	1^{2}	2^{1}	2^{2}	1^{3}	2^{2}	10^{1}	183
3	(Norway) Ola Fløene	3	3	3^{2}	Ret	3^{3}	36^{3}	2^{3}	Ret	3	4^{3}	3	1^{1}	3^{2}	171
4	(Sweden) Jonas Andersson	4	10^{3}	2	2^{3}	7	5	9	3	7	WD	6	4	7	116
5	(Republic of Ireland) Paul Nagle	10^{1}	7	16	1	4	24	7	17^{3}	12^{2}	3	4	5^{3}	2	112
6	(Belgium) Nicolas Gilsoul	5	2^{2}	8^{3}	Ret	38	3	6	4	5	7	23	8	Ret	90
7	(United Kingdom) Daniel Barritt	7	6	4	3	69	4	50	12	6	9	2	34	6	89
8	(Spain) Marc Martí	6		5	5^{2}	6	20	10	11	4^{3}	8	7	3	4	89
9	(New Zealand) John Kennard		5	17	16	8	2	4	Ret	9	5	5	6	5	84
10	(Estonia) Raigo Mõlder	18	4	22	11*	5	14	3^{2}	5	8	6	10	41	Ret	63
11	(Czech Republic) Jan Tománek	9	8	6	4	10	Ret	11	7	Ret		12	7	21	39
12	(Poland) Maciek Szczepaniak	Ret	19	18		9	30	8	Ret	35		23^{2}	11	9^{3}	11
13	(United Kingdom) Chris Patterson				6	24	10		16				15		9
14	(Finland) Tomi Suominen								6						8
15	(Ukraine) Pavlo Cherepin	16	9	13	13		7		13	15	11	20	14	37	8
16	(France) Matthieu Baumel			7		11	12	Ret		17	10		12		7
17	(United Kingdom) Marshall Clarke			11	7	16	11				12		23	16	6
18	(Monaco) Daniel Elena	8^{2}													6
19	(Belgium) Stéphane Prévot	12	Ret	Ret	Ret	15	26	Ret	EX	10	13	11	50	8	5
20	(Finland) Janne Ferm					12	17	12	8	42		14	Ret		4
21	(Argentina) Edgardo Galindo				8		25								4
22	(Italy) Anna Andreussi						8								4
23	(France) Thibault De La Haye	47										8			4
24	(Sweden) Emil Axelsson		17			13		13	9			Ret	9	WD	4
25	(Czech Republic) Pavel Dresler						9			13			10	WD	3
26	(Argentina) Fernando Mussano			9	Ret	17	15		Ret						2
27	(Argentina) Diego Cagnotti				9										2
28	(France) Jean-Jacques Renucci	34				29		38	24	33		9	46	33	2
29	(Italy) Lorenzo Granai						Ret	16	10	DNS	18	Ret	Ret	10	2
30	(Finland) Kaj Lindström		13	10	12	Ret		17					36	WD	1
Pos.	Co-driver	MON (Monaco)	SWE (Sweden)	MEX (Mexico)	ARG (Argentina)	POR (Portugal)	ITA (Italy)	POL (Poland)	FIN (Finland)	GER (Germany)	AUS (Australia)	FRA (France)	ESP (Spain)	GBR (United Kingdom)	Points

Key
Colour	Result
Gold	Winner
Silver	2nd place
Bronze	3rd place
Green	Points finish
Blue	Non-points finish
Blue	Non-classified finish (NC)
Purple	Did not finish (Ret)
Black	Excluded (EX)
Black	Disqualified (DSQ)
White	Did not start (DNS)
White	Cancelled (C)
Blank	Withdrew entry from the event (WD)

Notes:
^{1 2 3} – Indicate position on Power stage

- – Raigo Mõlder finished 11th in the Argentine
  rally, but was credited with one championship
  point because the driver who finished 10th
  was ineligible for championship points.

=== FIA World Rally Championship for Manufacturers ===
Points are awarded to the top ten classified finishers.

Position	1st	2nd	3rd	4th	5th	6th	7th	8th	9th	10th
Points	25	18	15	12	10	8	6	4	2	1

Pos.	Manufacturer	No.	MON (Monaco)	SWE (Sweden)	MEX (Mexico)	ARG (Argentina)	POR (Portugal)	ITA (Italy)	POL (Poland)	FIN (Finland)	GER (Germany)	AUS (Australia)	FRA (France)	ESP (Spain)	GBR (United Kingdom)	Points
1	(Germany) Volkswagen Motorsport	1	1	1	1	8	2	1	1	2	1	1	10	Ret	1	413
1	(Germany) Volkswagen Motorsport	2	2	Ret	7	Ret	1	6	5	1	2	2	1	2	10	413
2	(France) Citroën Total Abu Dhabi World Rally Team	3	8	7	8	1	4	9	7	10	10	3	4	5	2	230
2	(France) Citroën Total Abu Dhabi World Rally Team	4	6	9	2	2	7	5	8	3	7	10	6	4	7	230
3	(South Korea) Hyundai Motorsport	7	3	2	6	Ret	10	3	6	4	5	7	11	8	4	224
3	(South Korea) Hyundai Motorsport	8	4	5	4	5	6	8	9	8	4	5	7	3	5	224
4	(United Kingdom) M-Sport World Rally Team	5	5	6	3	3	11	4	12	9	6	9	2	9	6	181
4	(United Kingdom) M-Sport World Rally Team	6	9	4	10	6	5	7	3	5	8	6	8	10	Ret	181
5	(Germany) Volkswagen Motorsport II	9		3		Ret	3	10	2	Ret	3	4	3	1	3	131
6	(South Korea) Hyundai Motorsport N	20		10	9	7	8	2	4	Ret	9	8	5	6	Ret	67
7	(Czech Republic) Jipocar Czech National Team	21	7	8	5	4	9	Ret	10	6	Ret		9	7	9	53
8	(Italy) FWRT s.r.l.	37	10	Ret	Ret	9	Ret	Ret	11	7	DNS	11	Ret	Ret	8	13
Pos.	Manufacturer	No.	MON (Monaco)	SWE (Sweden)	MEX (Mexico)	ARG (Argentina)	POR (Portugal)	ITA (Italy)	POL (Poland)	FIN (Finland)	GER (Germany)	AUS (Australia)	FRA (France)	ESP (Spain)	GBR (United Kingdom)	Points

Key
Colour	Result
Gold	Winner
Silver	2nd place
Bronze	3rd place
Green	Points finish
Blue	Non-points finish
Blue	Non-classified finish (NC)
Purple	Did not finish (Ret)
Black	Excluded (EX)
Black	Disqualified (DSQ)
White	Did not start (DNS)
White	Cancelled (C)
Blank	Withdrew entry from the event (WD)
