= Volkswagen Motorsport =

Auto racing factory team by Volkswagen

VWR Motorsport
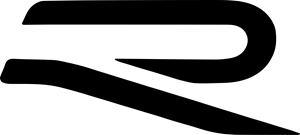
- Full name: Volkswagen R Motorsport
- Base: Hannover, Germany
- Team principal(s): (Germany) Jost Capito
- Technical director: (Germany) Willy Rampf
- Drivers: (Finland) Jari-Matti Latvala (France) Sébastien Ogier (Norway) Andreas Mikkelsen
- Co-drivers: (Finland) Miikka Anttila (France) Julien Ingrassia (Norway) Anders Jæger
- Chassis: Volkswagen Polo R WRC
- Tyres: M Michelin

World Rally Championship history
- Debut: 2013 Monte Carlo Rally
- Last event: 2016 Rally Australia
- Manufacturers' Championships: 4 (2013, 2014, 2015, 2016)
- Drivers' Championships: 4 (2013, 2014, 2015, 2016)
- Rally wins: 44

The Volkswagen R Motorsport was a works rally team of the German car manufacturer Volkswagen, who competed in the World Rally Championship (WRC) and Dakar Rally.

The team started competing in WRC in 1978 and used different specs of Volkswagen Golfs before leaving the sport in 1990. Volkswagen competed at the Dakar Rally from 2003 to 2011, claiming three overall wins. The team made its WRC comeback in 2011 Rally Finland with a pair of Škoda Fabia S2000s, and competed with the Volkswagen Polo R WRC from the start of the 2013 World Rally Championship season to the end of the 2016 World Rally Championship season.

At the end of the 2016 season, Volkswagen Motorsport decided to withdraw from the FIA World Rally Championship.

== History ==
=== Dakar (2003–2011) ===
In 2003, Volkswagen entered the Tarek 2WD buggy at the Dakar Rally, with Stéphane Henrard placing 6th outright. The Race Touareg 1 was introduced in 2004, when Bruno Saby finished 6th. In 2005, Jutta Kleinschmidt finished in 3rd overall. With the Race Touareg 2, Giniel de Villiers finished in 2nd place overall in 2006. In 2007, Mark Miller finished 4th overall. Volkswagen won the 2009, 2010 and 2011 Dakar Rally, the latter with the Race Touareg 3, with drivers De Villiers, Carlos Sainz and Nasser Al-Attiyah.

=== 2011–2012 ===
In 2011 Volkswagen competed with seven different drivers in four rallies (Rally Finland, Rallye Deutschland, Rally Catalunya and Wales Rally GB). German Christian Riedemann was the only driver competing in two rallies.

In November 2011, the team revealed they have made a multi-year contract with the French rally star Sébastien Ogier and his co-driver Julien Ingrassia.

For 2012 season, Volkswagen Motorsport continued developing their Polo R World Rally Car and they also completed a full WRC-campaign (except New Zealand) with a pair of Škoda Fabias. Sébastien Ogier drove it in every round of the campaign, while the second car was shared between Andreas Mikkelsen and Kevin Abbring. The team had a third car in their home rally Germany driven by Sepp Wiegand.

The season included some highlights, including Sébastien Ogier's unexpected special stage win in Sardinia. Ogier's fifth place in Sardinia also remains the best ever overall finish for a S2000 car in World Rally Championship. Also important to mention that Mikkelsen was the first ever S2000 driver to score Power Stage points, which he did during 2012 Rallye Deutschland by finishing 3rd on the penultimate stage.

In October, Volkswagen Motorsport announced that they have signed Jari-Matti Latvala with his co-driver Miikka Anttila to join Ogier and Ingrassia to drive Volkswagen Polo R WRC for 2013 season.

=== 2013 ===
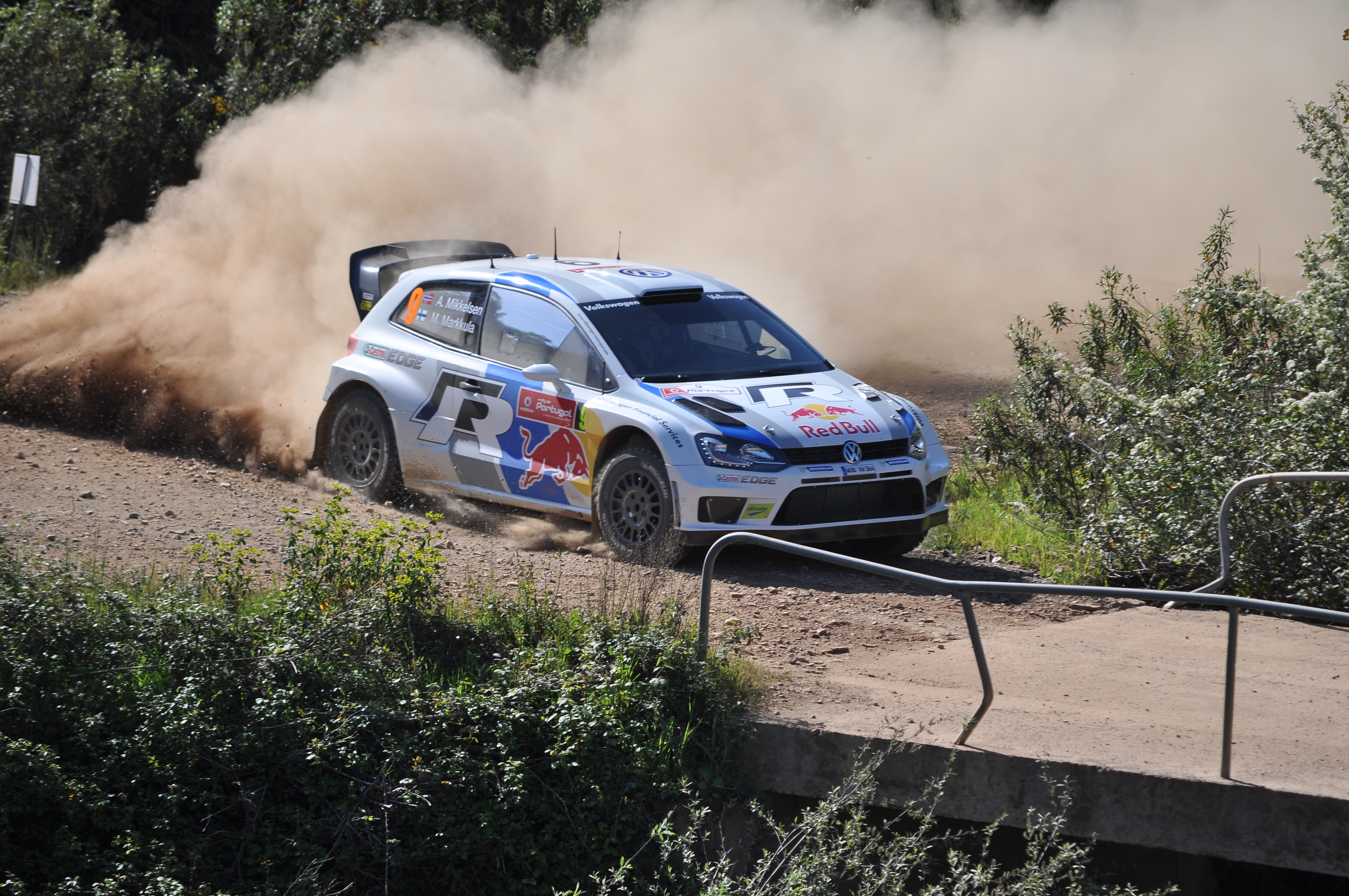
Andreas Mikkelsen driving a Volkswagen Polo R WRC at the 2013 Rally de Portugal.

Volkswagen Motorsport entered as a fully-fledged manufacturer team in 2013. Sébastien Ogier and Jari-Matti Latvala started the season, whilst Andreas Mikkelsen joined the championship at the fourth round in Portugal. Mikkelsen and his new co-driver Mikko Markkula were registered under a second manufacturer team, known as “Volkswagen Motorsport II” so as to give them as much time as possible testing the Polo R WRC.

The 2013 season started with Rallye Monte-Carlo. Volkswagen entered the rally with two cars, Latvala/Anttila and Ogier/Ingrassia. Ogier started their campaign with a dream start by winning the very first stage of the season, and the first of Volkswagen Polo R WRC. Ogier won one more stage and finished the rally in second place, nearly two minutes behind the winner Sébastien Loeb. Jari-Matti Latvala's rally ended in last evening of the rally when he hit the wall in slippery conditions.

The team took its first WRC victory in their second rally with the World Rally Car, when Sébastien Ogier dominated the Rally Sweden being fastest in half of the stages of the rally. Jari-Matti Latvala finished fourth, and also scored his first stage win with the team.

Ogier continued his dominance at the next event in Rally Mexico, giving the team its second victory in a row. Ogier won 16 out of 23 stages and lead the rally from the second stage till the finish. Latvala hit a rock in SS2 and after restarting in Day 2 he eventually finished outside of the points. That meant Volkswagen was still 6 points behind Citroën in Manufacturers' standings before moving on to Rally de Portugal.

=== 2016 ===
2016 would turn out to be another successful year for the team; as they collected their fourth consecutive manufacturers’ championship, and Sébastien Ogier claimed his fourth consecutive drivers’ championship.

Just days after the 2016 Wales Rally GB, Volkswagen announced that they would be pulling out of the WRC at the end of the 2016 season. This came as a surprise to many fans and journalists, as the team and their drivers had already been conducting major development and testing work on the new 2017 Polo, based on the new generation WRC cars. Although no direct reason was given for the teams’ withdrawal, it was widely speculated to be a result of Volkswagen’s recent emissions scandal.

=== 2018 ===
Volkswagen Motorsport made a return to the World Rally Championship with an R5 version of the Volkswagen Polo GTI. The car made its debut at the 2018 Rally Catalunya, with entries for both Petter Solberg and Eric Camilli.

=== 2019 ===
In November 2019, Volkswagen announced that, consistent with its shift in focus to emphasize the manufacturing of electric vehicles, it would end all internal combustion engine-based motorsport activities.

== Complete WRC results ==
=== WRC victories ===
No.	Season	Rally	Driver	Co-driver	Car
1	1987	(Ivory Coast) 19ème Rallye Côte d'Ivoire	(Sweden) Kenneth Eriksson	(West Germany) Peter Diekmann	Volkswagen Golf GTI 16V
2	2013	61st Rally Sweden	(France) Sébastien Ogier	(France) Julien Ingrassia	Volkswagen Polo R WRC
3	2013	(Mexico) 27º Rally México	(France) Sébastien Ogier	(France) Julien Ingrassia	Volkswagen Polo R WRC
4	2013	47º Rally de Portugal	(France) Sébastien Ogier	(France) Julien Ingrassia	Volkswagen Polo R WRC
5	2013	(Greece) 59th Acropolis Rally	(Finland) Jari-Matti Latvala	(Finland) Miikka Anttila	Volkswagen Polo R WRC
6	2013	(Italy) 10º Rally Italia Sardegna	(France) Sébastien Ogier	(France) Julien Ingrassia	Volkswagen Polo R WRC
7	2013	63rd Rally Finland	(France) Sébastien Ogier	(France) Julien Ingrassia	Volkswagen Polo R WRC
8	2013	22nd Rally Australia	(France) Sébastien Ogier	(France) Julien Ingrassia	Volkswagen Polo R WRC
9	2013	Rallye de France – Alsace 2013	(France) Sébastien Ogier	(France) Julien Ingrassia	Volkswagen Polo R WRC
10	2013	(Spain) 49º Rally Catalunya	(France) Sébastien Ogier	(France) Julien Ingrassia	Volkswagen Polo R WRC
11	2013	(United Kingdom) 69th Wales Rally GB	(France) Sébastien Ogier	(France) Julien Ingrassia	Volkswagen Polo R WRC
12	2014	(Monaco) 82ème Rallye Automobile Monte-Carlo	(France) Sébastien Ogier	(France) Julien Ingrassia	Volkswagen Polo R WRC
13	2014	62nd Rally Sweden	(Finland) Jari-Matti Latvala	(Finland) Miikka Anttila	Volkswagen Polo R WRC
14	2014	(Mexico) 28º Rally México	(France) Sébastien Ogier	(France) Julien Ingrassia	Volkswagen Polo R WRC
15	2014	48º Rally de Portugal	(France) Sébastien Ogier	(France) Julien Ingrassia	Volkswagen Polo R WRC
16	2014	34° Rally Argentina	(Finland) Jari-Matti Latvala	(Finland) Miikka Anttila	Volkswagen Polo R WRC
17	2014	(Italy) 11º Rally Italia Sardegna	(France) Sébastien Ogier	(France) Julien Ingrassia	Volkswagen Polo R WRC
18	2014	71st Rally Poland	(France) Sébastien Ogier	(France) Julien Ingrassia	Volkswagen Polo R WRC
19	2014	64th Rally Finland	(Finland) Jari-Matti Latvala	(Finland) Miikka Anttila	Volkswagen Polo R WRC
20	2014	23rd Rally Australia	(France) Sébastien Ogier	(France) Julien Ingrassia	Volkswagen Polo R WRC
21	2014	Rallye de France – Alsace 2014	(Finland) Jari-Matti Latvala	(Finland) Miikka Anttila	Volkswagen Polo R WRC
22	2014	(Spain) 50º Rally Catalunya	(France) Sébastien Ogier	(France) Julien Ingrassia	Volkswagen Polo R WRC
23	2014	(United Kingdom) 70th Wales Rally GB	(France) Sébastien Ogier	(France) Julien Ingrassia	Volkswagen Polo R WRC
24	2015	(Monaco) 83ème Rallye Automobile Monte-Carlo	(France) Sébastien Ogier	(France) Julien Ingrassia	Volkswagen Polo R WRC
25	2015	63rd Rally Sweden	(France) Sébastien Ogier	(France) Julien Ingrassia	Volkswagen Polo R WRC
26	2015	(Mexico) 29° Rally Guanajuato México	(France) Sébastien Ogier	(France) Julien Ingrassia	Volkswagen Polo R WRC
27	2015	49° Vodafone Rally de Portugal	(Finland) Jari-Matti Latvala	(Finland) Miikka Anttila	Volkswagen Polo R WRC
28	2015	(Italy) 12° Rally d'italia Sardegna	(France) Sébastien Ogier	(France) Julien Ingrassia	Volkswagen Polo R WRC
29	2015	72nd LOTOS Rally Poland	(France) Sébastien Ogier	(France) Julien Ingrassia	Volkswagen Polo R WRC
30	2015	65th Rally Finland	(Finland) Jari-Matti Latvala	(Finland) Miikka Anttila	Volkswagen Polo R WRC
31	2015	(Germany) 33. ADAC Rallye Deutschland	(France) Sébastien Ogier	(France) Julien Ingrassia	Volkswagen Polo R WRC
32	2015	24th Coates Hire Rally Australia	(France) Sébastien Ogier	(France) Julien Ingrassia	Volkswagen Polo R WRC
33	2015	58ème Tour de Corse – Rallye de France	(Finland) Jari-Matti Latvala	(Finland) Miikka Anttila	Volkswagen Polo R WRC
34	2015	(Spain) 51º Rally Catalunya	(Norway) Andreas Mikkelsen	(Norway) Ola Fløene	Volkswagen Polo R WRC
35	2015	(United Kingdom) 71st Wales Rally GB	(France) Sébastien Ogier	(France) Julien Ingrassia	Volkswagen Polo R WRC
36	2016	(Monaco) 84ème Rallye Automobile Monte-Carlo	(France) Sébastien Ogier	(France) Julien Ingrassia	Volkswagen Polo R WRC
37	2016	64th Rally Sweden	(France) Sébastien Ogier	(France) Julien Ingrassia	Volkswagen Polo R WRC
38	2016	(Mexico) 30º Rally Guanajuato México	(Finland) Jari-Matti Latvala	(Finland) Miikka Anttila	Volkswagen Polo R WRC
39	2016	73rd Rally Poland	(Norway) Andreas Mikkelsen	(Norway) Anders Jæger	Volkswagen Polo R WRC
40	2016	(Germany) 34. ADAC Rallye Deutschland	(France) Sébastien Ogier	(France) Julien Ingrassia	Volkswagen Polo R WRC
41	2016	59ème Tour de Corse – Rallye de France	(France) Sébastien Ogier	(France) Julien Ingrassia	Volkswagen Polo R WRC
42	2016	(Spain) 52º Rally RACC Catalunya – Costa Daurada	(France) Sébastien Ogier	(France) Julien Ingrassia	Volkswagen Polo R WRC
43	2016	(United Kingdom) 72nd Wales Rally GB	(France) Sébastien Ogier	(France) Julien Ingrassia	Volkswagen Polo R WRC
44	2016	25th Rally Australia	(Norway) Andreas Mikkelsen	(Norway) Anders Jæger	Volkswagen Polo R WRC

== Dakar Rally results ==
Year	Class	No	Driver	Co-Driver	Position	Stages won
2003	Cars	215	(Belgium) Stéphane Henrard	(United Kingdom) Bobby Willis	6th	1
2003	Cars	203	(Germany) Jutta Kleinschmidt	(Italy) Fabrizia Pons	8th	0
2004	Cars	204	(Germany) Jutta Kleinschmidt	(Italy) Fabrizia Pons	21st	1
2004	Cars	224	(France) Bruno Saby	(United Kingdom) Matthew Stevenson	6th	0
2005	Cars	307	(France) Bruno Saby	(France) Michel Périn	5th	2
2005	Cars	310	(Germany) Jutta Kleinschmidt	(Italy) Fabrizia Pons	3rd	1
2005	Cars	313	(Finland) Juha Kankkunen	(Finland) Juha Repo	DNF	0
2005	Cars	317	(United States) Robby Gordon	(Germany) Dirk von Zitzewitz	12th	2
2006	Cars	301	(France) Bruno Saby	(France) Michel Périn	8th	0
2006	Cars	303	(Germany) Jutta Kleinschmidt	(Italy) Fabrizia Pons	DNF	0
2006	Cars	305	(South Africa) Giniel de Villiers	(Sweden) Tina Thörner	2nd	1
2006	Cars	307	(Spain) Carlos Sainz	(Germany) Andreas Schulz	11th	4
2006	Cars	309	(United States) Mark Miller	(Germany) Dirk von Zitzewitz	5th	0
2007	Cars	301	(South Africa) Giniel de Villiers	(Germany) Dirk von Zitzewitz	11th	4
2007	Cars	303	(Spain) Carlos Sainz	(France) Michel Périn	9th	5
2007	Cars	305	(United States) Mark Miller	(South Africa) Ralph Pitchford	4th	0
2007	Cars	308	(Finland) Ari Vatanen	(Italy) Fabrizia Pons	DNF	0
2008	Event cancelled – replaced by the 2008 Central Europe Rally					
2009	Cars	301	(Spain) Carlos Sainz	(France) Michel Périn	DNF	6
2009	Cars	305	(South Africa) Giniel de Villiers	(Germany) Dirk von Zitzewitz	1st	4
2009	Cars	307	(Germany) Dieter Depping	(Germany) Timo Gottschalk	6th	0
2009	Cars	308	(United States) Mark Miller	(South Africa) Ralph Pitchford	2nd	0
2010	Cars	300	(South Africa) Giniel de Villiers	(Germany) Dirk von Zitzewitz	7th	0
2010	Cars	303	(Spain) Carlos Sainz	(France) Michel Périn	1st	2
2010	Cars	305	(United States) Mark Miller	(South Africa) Ralph Pitchford	3rd	1
2010	Cars	306	(Qatar) Nasser Al-Attiyah	(Germany) Timo Gottschalk	2nd	4
2011	Cars	300	(Spain) Carlos Sainz	(Spain) Lucas Cruz	3rd	7
2011	Cars	302	(Qatar) Nasser Al-Attiyah	(Germany) Timo Gottschalk	1st	4
2011	Cars	304	(United States) Mark Miller	(South Africa) Ralph Pitchford	6th	0
2011	Cars	308	(South Africa) Giniel de Villiers	(Germany) Dirk von Zitzewitz	2nd	1

== See also ==
- Citroën World Rally Team
- M-Sport World Rally Team
