= Estonian Rally Championship =

- Category: Rallying
- Country: Estonia
- Inaugural season: 1959
- Drivers' champion: (Estonia) Timmu Kõrge
- Co-Drivers' champion: (Estonia) Arro Vahtra (Estonia) Erki Pints
- Teams' champion: (Estonia) A1M Motorsport

Estonian Rally Championship is the national rally championship in Estonia, held annually since 1959.

== Calendar 2024 ==
1. (Latvia) Rally Alūksne 2024
2. (Estonia) Otepää Talveralli 2024
3. (Finland) Länsirannikon Ralli 2024
4. (Estonia) Võru Rally 2024
5. Rally Estonia National 2024
6. (Estonia) Paide Rally 2024
7. (Estonia) Saaremaa Rally 2024

== Rally classes ==
There are 10 rally classes in total. There is also a special class for trucks.

EMV1 is the absolute championship for all drivers.

EMV2 is the highest class where Rally2, R5 and S2000 cars compete.

EMV3 is class for Rally3 cars.

EMV4 is for front-wheel drive cars class for Rally4, Rally5 and R2 cars with engine capacity 2000 cm³.

EMV5 is for front-wheel drive cars such as E12 and N4 class cars.

EMV6 is for rear-wheel drive cars such as E11 class cars with engine capacity 3500 cm³.

EMV7 is for front-wheel drive cars such as R3, A7, N3, E10 class cars with engine capacity 1600-2000 cm³.

EMV8 is the lowest car class for E9 class cars with engine capacity maximum 1600 cm³.

EMV9 is trucks class which is usually driven by Soviet era trucks like GAZ 51.

EMV Lada is historic rally class for Lada rally cars like Lada VFTS.

EMV10 is constructors championship.

== Champions ==
Champion without notes is considered absolute winner, others show the winning class.

Season	Driver	Co-driver	Car	Team	Notes
1959	(Soviet Union) B. Borsianski	(Soviet Union) V. Jegorov		Moskva	Moskvitch
1960	(Estonian Soviet Socialist Republic) Valdo Mägi	(Estonian Soviet Socialist Republic) Mihkel Tartlain		Tallinna Kalev	Moskvitch
1961	(Estonian Soviet Socialist Republic) Kalju Nurme	(Estonian Soviet Socialist Republic) Aadu Viik		Tallinna Kalev	Moskvitch
1962	(Estonian Soviet Socialist Republic) Valdo Mägi	(Estonian Soviet Socialist Republic) Kalju Nurme		Tallinna Kalev	Moskvitch
1963	(Estonian Soviet Socialist Republic) Valdo Mägi	(Estonian Soviet Socialist Republic) Kalju Nurme		Tallinna Kalev	Moskvitch
1964	(Estonian Soviet Socialist Republic) Valdo Mägi	(Estonian Soviet Socialist Republic) Kalju Nurme		Tallinna Kalev	Moskvitch
1965	(Estonian Soviet Socialist Republic) Avo Tilga	(Estonian Soviet Socialist Republic) Väino Nemvalts		Tartu Kalev	Moskvitch
1966	(Estonian Soviet Socialist Republic) Enno Luik	(Estonian Soviet Socialist Republic) Valdo Kuusik		Sõprus TSK	Moskvitch
1967	(Estonian Soviet Socialist Republic) Gunnar Holm	(Estonian Soviet Socialist Republic) Hans Rüütel	Moskvitch 412	SK Tempo	Moskvitch
1968	(Estonian Soviet Socialist Republic) Toomas Bernstein	(Estonian Soviet Socialist Republic) Heino Sepp	Moskvitch 408	ETKVL TSK	Moskvitch 408
1969	(Estonian Soviet Socialist Republic) Valdo Mägi	(Estonian Soviet Socialist Republic) Ülo Eismann	Moskvitch 408	Tervishoiu min. Autopark	
1970	(Estonian Soviet Socialist Republic) Valdo Mägi	(Estonian Soviet Socialist Republic) Ülo Eismann	Moskvitch 408	Tervishoiu min. Autopark	Moskvitch 408
1971	(Estonian Soviet Socialist Republic) Valdo Mägi	(Estonian Soviet Socialist Republic) Ülo Eismann	Moskvitch 408	Tervishoiu min. Autopark	
1972	(Estonian Soviet Socialist Republic) Madis Possul	(Estonian Soviet Socialist Republic) Uudo Laaneots	Moskvitch 412	Tallinna EPT	
1973	(Estonian Soviet Socialist Republic) Kaarel-Ain Viirok	(Estonian Soviet Socialist Republic) Arvi Bachmann	Moskvitch 412	Rapla MEK	
1974	(Estonian Soviet Socialist Republic) Heiki Ohu	(Estonian Soviet Socialist Republic) Väino Touart	Lada VAZ 2101	Sõprus TSK	
1975	(Estonian Soviet Socialist Republic) Heiki Ohu	(Estonian Soviet Socialist Republic) Väino Touart	Lada VAZ 2101	Sõprus TSK	
1976	(Estonian Soviet Socialist Republic) Madis Possul	(Estonian Soviet Socialist Republic) Väino Touart	Lada VAZ 2101	Sõprus TSK	7. classe
1977	(Estonian Soviet Socialist Republic) Olavi Ellermann	(Estonian Soviet Socialist Republic) Meelis Arumeel	Lada VAZ 2101	Sõprus TSK	7. classe
1978	(Estonian Soviet Socialist Republic) Olavi Ellermann	(Estonian Soviet Socialist Republic) Meelis Arumeel	Lada VAZ 2101	Sõprus TSK	I classe
1979	(Estonian Soviet Socialist Republic) Jüri Triisa	(Estonian Soviet Socialist Republic) Valdur Lembing	Lada VAZ 2101	Nuia EPT	
1980	(Estonian Soviet Socialist Republic) Toonart Rääsk	(Estonian Soviet Socialist Republic) Lehar Linno		ETKVL Koondis Auto	I classe
1981	(Estonian Soviet Socialist Republic) Ivar Peedu	(Estonian Soviet Socialist Republic) Juhan Kasemaa	Lada VAZ 2101	Tallinna Autoveod	7. classe
1982	(Estonian Soviet Socialist Republic) Ando Nõel	(Estonian Soviet Socialist Republic) Rein Talvar	Lada VAZ 2101	Harju KEK Ralliklubi	7. classe
1983	(Estonian Soviet Socialist Republic) Enn Jõemägi	(Estonian Soviet Socialist Republic) Tiit Sepp	Lada VAZ 2105	Rakvere Jõud/Rakvere EPT	7. classe
1984	(Estonian Soviet Socialist Republic) Enn Jõemägi	(Estonian Soviet Socialist Republic) Tiit Sepp	Lada VAZ 2105	Rakvere TSK	7. classe
1985	(Estonian Soviet Socialist Republic) Aare Klooren	(Estonian Soviet Socialist Republic) Urmas Püssim	Lada VAZ 2105	ERF Mobile	7. classe
1986	(Estonian Soviet Socialist Republic) Mihhail Orlov	(Estonian Soviet Socialist Republic) Hannes Vares	Lada VAZ 2101	Rakvere TSK	7. classe
1987	(Estonian Soviet Socialist Republic) Toomas Seger	(Estonian Soviet Socialist Republic) Tiit Paju	Lada VAZ 2105 VFTS	Vinni TSK	7. classe
1988	(Estonian Soviet Socialist Republic) Aare Klooren	(Estonian Soviet Socialist Republic) Toomas Kreek	VAZ 2108	Mobile	7. classe
1989	(Estonian Soviet Socialist Republic) Ilmar Raissar	(Estonian Soviet Socialist Republic) Rein Talvar	Lada VAZ 2105 VFTS	Harju KEK Ralliklubi	A-2
1990	(Estonian Soviet Socialist Republic) Aare Klooren	(Estonian Soviet Socialist Republic) Toomas Kreek	Lada Samara	Mobile	A-8
1991	(Estonia) Ivar Raidam	(Estonia) Margus Karjane	Lada Samara	Harju KEK Ralliklubi	A8
1992	(Estonia) Ivar Raidam	(Estonia) Margus Karjane	Lada Samara 21083	Harju KEK Ralliklubi	
1993	(Estonia) Marek Toome	(Estonia) Aleksander Käo	Toyota Celica 4WD	Tallinna Sadam	
1994	(Estonia) Ivar Raidam	(Estonia) Margus Karjane	Ford Escort RS Cosworth	Harju KEK Ralliklubi	A>2000
1995	(Estonia) Ivar Raidam	(Estonia) Margus Karjane	Ford Escort RS Cosworth	Harju KEK Ralliklubi	N2000
1995	(Estonia) Raido Rüütel	(Estonia) Robert Lepikson	Toyota Celica 4WD	Rüütel & Vanaselja Racing	A>2000
1996	(Estonia) Ivar Raidam	(Estonia) Margus Karjane	Mitsubishi Lancer Evo III	Harju KEK Ralliklubi	N 2000+
1996	(Estonia) Raido Rüütel	(Estonia) Robert Lepikson	Toyota Celica 4WD	EMEX	A, E 2000+
1997	(Estonia) Ivar Raidam	(Estonia) Margus Karjane	Mitsubishi Lancer Evo III	Harju KEK Ralliklubi	N 2000+
1997	(Estonia) Markko Märtin	(Estonia) Toomas Kitsing	Toyota Celica 4 WD T	EK	A, E 2000+
1998	(Estonia) Markko Märtin	(Estonia) Toomas Kitsing	Toyota Celica GT Four	E.O.S-Finest	A, E 2000+
1998	(Estonia) Riho Parts	(Estonia) Aare Kaaristo	Mitsubishi Lancer Evo III	EMEX	N 2000+
1999	(Estonia) Ivar Raidam	(Estonia) Robert Lepikson	Mitsubishi Lancer Evo IV	Harju KEK Ralliklubi	A, E 2000+
1999	(Estonia) Margus Murakas	(Estonia) Toomas Sildmäe & (Estonia) Peep Kallaste	Subaru Impreza 555	Mariine Auto	N 2000+
2000	(Estonia) Ivar Raidam	(Estonia) Robert Lepikson	Mitsubishi Lancer Evo VI	Harju KEK Ralliklubi	A 2000+
2000	(Estonia) Margus Murakas	(Estonia) Peep Kallaste	Subaru Impreza 555	Mariine Auto	N, E 2000+
2001	(Estonia) Margus Murakas	(Estonia) Toomas Kitsing	Toyota Corolla WRC	Toyota Castrol Baltic RT	A 2000+
2001	(Estonia) Urmo Aava	(Estonia) Peeter Poom	Subaru Impreza	Subaru-Valvoline RT	N, E 2000+
2002	(Estonia) Margus Murakas	(Estonia) Toomas Kitsing	Toyota Corolla WRC	Toyota Castrol Baltic RT	A 2000+
2002	(Estonia) Mait Meriloo	(Estonia) Peep Kallaste & (Estonia) Meelis Pihel	Mitsubishi Lancer	Toyota Castrol Baltic RT	N 2000+
2003	(Estonia) Slava Popov	(Estonia) Sergei Larens	Mitsubishi Lancer Evo 3	Cueks Racing	A 2000+
2003	(Estonia) Ivar Raidam	(Estonia) Robert Lepikson	Mitsubishi Lancer Evo 6	Harju KEK Ralliklubi	N 2000+
2004	(Russia) Aleksander Dorossinski	(Russia) Dmitri Balin	Subaru Impreza	Cueks Racing	N2000+
2005	(Estonia) Margus Murakas	(Estonia) Aare Ojamäe & (Estonia) Raul Markus	Toyota Corolla WRC	Sar-Tech Motorsport & Uno X Rally Team	A6+E10
2006	(Estonia) Martin Rauam	(Estonia) Kristo Kraag	Subaru Impreza Spec C	Subaru - E.O.S. Rally Team	
2007	(Estonia) Rainer Aus	(Estonia) Kristo Kraag & (Estonia) Silver Kütt	Subaru Impreza Spec C	Subaru - Finest Rally Team	
2008	(Estonia) Aivo Hintser	(Estonia) Janek Tamm	Mitsubishi Lancer Evo 6	AGK Sportdrive	A8, WRC, E12
2008	(Estonia) Ott Tänak	(Estonia) Raigo Mõlder & (Estonia) Kristo Kraag	Subaru Impreza WRX STi	Subaru Autospiritist	N4, Super 2000
2009	(Estonia) Marko Kasepõld	(Estonia) Rein Jõessar	Mitsubishi Lancer Evo 6	Märjamaa Rally Team & Harju KEK Ralliklubi	WRC, A8, E12
2009	(Estonia) Ott Tänak	(Estonia) Raigo Mõlder	Subaru Impreza WRX STi	Subaru Autospiritist	N4, S2000
2010	(Estonia) Margus Remmak	(Estonia) Urmas Roosimaa & (Estonia) Olaf Suuder	Mitsubishi Lancer Evo 9	Harju KEK Ralliklubi	
2011	(Latvia) Jānis Vorobjovs	(Latvia) Guntars Zicāns	Mitsubishi Lancer Evo 10	Vorobjovs Racing	
2012	(Estonia) Rainer Aus	(Estonia) Rein Jõessar & (Estonia) Simo Koskinen	Mitsubishi Lancer Evo 9	Carglass Rally Team	
2013	(Estonia) Georg Gross	(Estonia) Raigo Mõlder	Ford Focus RS WRC 08	OT Racing	
2014	(Estonia) Timmu Kõrge	(Estonia) Erki Pints	Ford Fiesta R5	MM-Motorsport	EMV1
2014	(Russia) Aleksey Lukyanuk	(Russia) Aleksei Arnautov	Mitsubishi Lancer Evo 10	EAMV	EMV2 (N4)
2015	(Estonia) Siim Plangi	(Estonia) Marek Sarapuu & (Estonia) Urmas Roosimaa	Mitsubishi Lancer Evo 10	ASRT Rally Team	
2016	(Estonia) Egon Kaur	(Estonia) Erik Lepikson & (Estonia) Silver Simm	Mitsubishi Lancer Evo 9	Kaur Motorsport	
2017	(Estonia) Georg Gross	(Estonia) Raigo Mõlder	Ford Fiesta RS WRC	OT Racing	
2018	(Ukraine) Valeriy Gorban	(Estonia) Sergei Larens	Mini Cooper WRC	Eurolamp World Rally Team	
2019	(Estonia) Georg Gross	(Estonia) Raigo Mõlder	Ford Fiesta WRC	OT Racing	
2020	(Estonia) Georg Gross	(Estonia) Raigo Mõlder	Ford Fiesta WRC	OT Racing	
2021	(Estonia) Georg Gross	(Estonia) Raigo Mõlder	Ford Fiesta WRC	OT Racing	
2022	(Estonia) Gregor Jeets	(Estonia) Timo Taniel	Škoda Fabia Rally2 evo	Tehase Auto	
2023	(Estonia) Timmu Kõrge	(Estonia) Arro Vahtra & (Estonia) Erki Pints	Mitsubishi Lancer Evo 10	A1M Motorsport	
