= Georg Gross =

Estonian rally driver (born 1983)

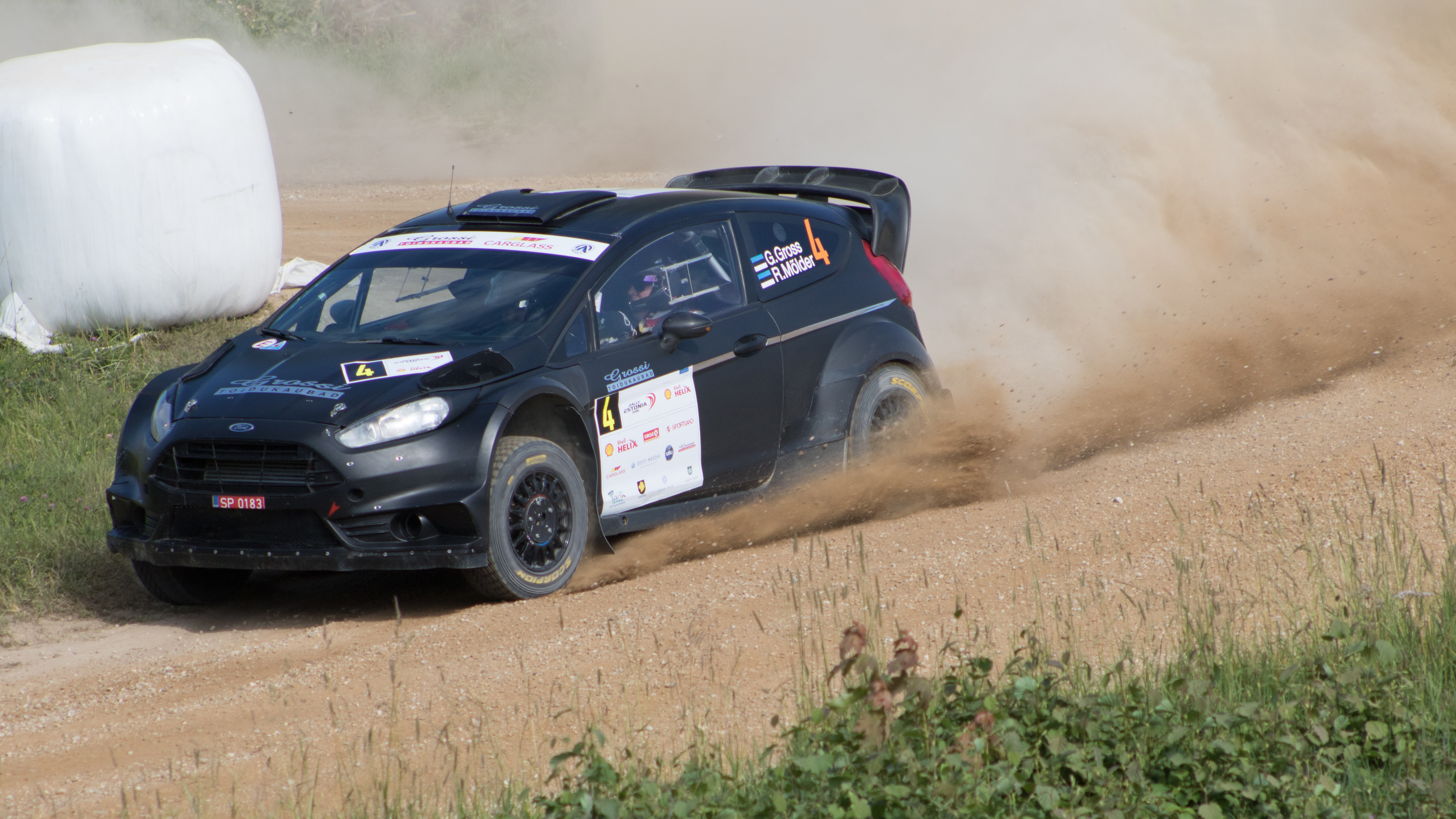

Personal information
- Nationality: (Estonia) Estonian
- Born: January 22, 1983 (age 43)

World Rally Championship record
- Years active: 2009, 2020
- Co-driver: Raigo Mõlder
- Teams: OT Racing
- Rallies: 2
- Championships: 0
- Rally wins: 0
- Podiums: 0
- Stage wins: 0
- Total points: 0
- First rally: 2009 Rally Finland
- Last rally: 2020 Rally Estonia

Georg Gross (born 22 January 1983) is an Estonian rally driver. He won the Estonian Rally Championship five times, in 2013, 2017, 2019, 2020 and 2021.

== Rally results ==
=== WRC results ===
Year	Entrant	Car	1	2	3	4	5	6	7	8	9	10	11	12	WDC	Points
2009	Georg Gross	Subaru Impreza STi N12	IRE	NOR	CYP	POR	ARG	ITA	GRE	POL	FIN; Ret	AUS	ESP	GBR	NC	0
2020	OT Racing	Ford Fiesta WRC	MON	SWE	MEX	EST; Ret	TUR	ITA	MNZ						NC	0

* Season still in progress.

== Personal life ==
Georg Gross is the son of the Estonian entrepreneur Oleg Gross. He and his wife Katrin Gross have a daughter together.
