= Raigo Mõlder =

Estonian rally co-driver (born 1982)

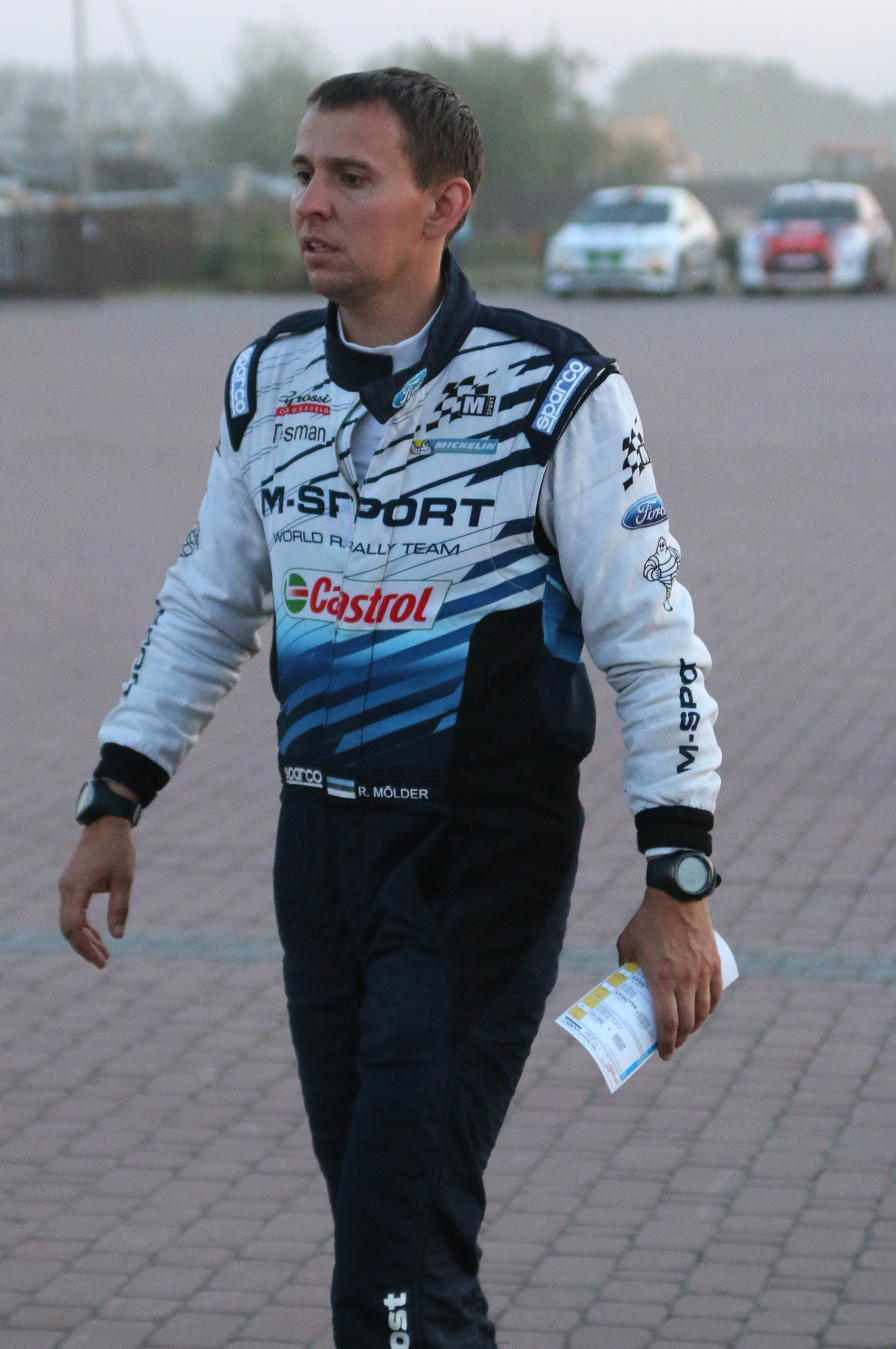
- Mõlder in 2015

Personal information
- Nationality: Estonia
- Born: 25 March 1982 (age 44)

World Rally Championship record
- Years active: 2009, 2014–2016, 2020
- Driver: (Estonia) Georg Gross; (Estonia) Ott Tänak
- Teams: M-Sport World Rally Team; DMACK World Rally Team
- Rallies: 38
- Championships: 0
- Rally wins: 0
- Podiums: 3
- Stage wins: 42
- First rally: 2009 Rally Finland
- Last rally: 2020 Rally Estonia

Raigo Mõlder (born 25 March 1982) is an Estonian rally co-driver. He was the co-driver of 2019 World Rally Champion Ott Tänak from 2014 to 2016.

== Rally career ==
Mõlder made his WRC debut at 2009 Rally Finland, where he was the navigator of compatriot Georg Gross in a Subaru Impreza STi N12. His most successful part of career was with Ott Tänak.

Mõlder achieved his first podium finish at 2015 Rally Poland. A year later, at 2016 Rally Poland, it could be a victory until a puncture dropped the Estonian crew down to second.

Mõlder and Tänak garnered mainstream attention during the third stage of 2015 Rally México, Los Mexicanos, when the Estonian crew crashed their Ford Fiesta RS WRC into a lake, but both Mõlder and Tänak were able to extract themselves from the car prior to it submerging. The car was recovered from the lake before repaired by the M-Sport World Rally Team and dubbed the TiTänak — a portmanteau of the RMS Titanic passenger liner, that sank in 1912, and Tänak's name. They re-joined the rally on Sunday, finishing 22nd overall and scoring a manufacturers' championship point.

== Rally results ==
=== WRC results ===
Year	Entrant	Car	1	2	3	4	5	6	7	8	9	10	11	12	13	14	WDC	Points
2009	Georg Gross	Subaru Impreza WRX STi	IRE	NOR	CYP	POR	ARG	ITA	GRE	POL	FIN; Ret	AUS	ESP	GBR			NC	0
2014	M-Sport WRT	Ford Fiesta RS WRC	MON	SWE; 5		POR; Ret											16th	17
2014	Drive Dmack	Ford Fiesta R5			MEX; 15		ARG; 17	ITA; 21	POL; 11	FIN; 12	GER; 10	AUS; Ret	FRA	ESP			16th	17
2014	Drive Dmack	Ford Fiesta RS WRC													GBR; 7		16th	17
2015	M-Sport WRT	Ford Fiesta RS WRC	MON; 18	SWE; 4	MEX; 22	ARG; 11	POR; 5	ITA; 14	POL; 3	FIN; 5	GER; 8	AUS; 6	FRA; 10	ESP; 41	GBR; Ret		10th	63
2016	DMACK WRT	Ford Fiesta RS WRC	MON; 7	SWE; 5	MEX; 6	ARG; 15	POR; Ret	ITA; 5	POL; 2	FIN; Ret	GER; 23	CHN; C	FRA; 10	ESP; 6	GBR; 2	AUS; 7	8th	88
2020	OT Racing	Ford Fiesta WRC	MON	SWE	MEX	EST; Ret	TUR	ITA	MNZ								NC	0
