= Special stage (rallying) =

Closed course for timed speed tests in rallying

A special stage (SS) is a section of closed road at a stage rallying event used for timed speed tests. Racers attempt to complete the stage in the shortest time. A race on a special stage is coordinated such that each competing racer begins after a set interval, to reduce the chance of impedance by other competitors. Each special stage is usually between 10 kilometres (6.2 mi) and 30 kilometres (19 mi) in length. Some stages may be as long as 50 kilometres (31 miles) in length. A rally usually comprises approximately 15–30 special stages, over multiple days of an event. The driver with the lowest overall time for all special stages in an event is the winner.

== Special stage ==
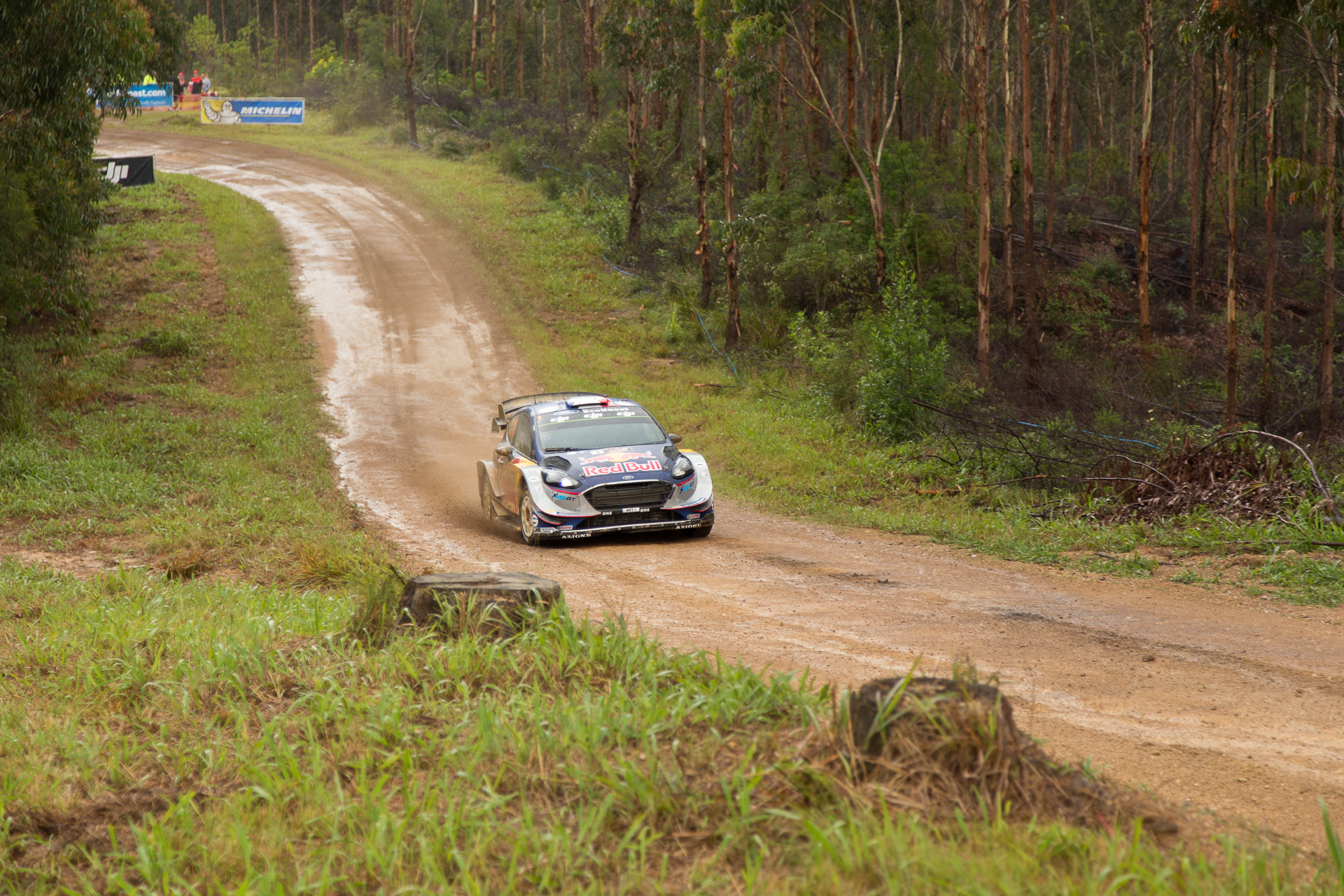
A special stage at the 2017 Rally Australia.

The roads on which special stages are held vary from rally to rally, from the asphalt mountain passes used on the Monte Carlo Rally to the rough forest tracks used on the Rally GB. Surfaces such as ice and snow or desert sand are also common, with the aim of providing a challenge for the driver and crew as well as a test of the car's performance and reliability.

While competing on a special stage, the drivers and co-drivers can have no support from their teams (except through radio/phone contact) and must deal with any breakdowns or problems themselves.

Typically, each car will be given a specific start time for a stage at four-minute intervals. In the minutes before setting off, a car will wait stationary at the start point until the driver scheduled start time. The driver may begin immediately at that time, and usually an official (using hand signals) and the co-driver (through speech) will provide a ten-second countdown. The timing of a stage for a particular car starts at its scheduled time, not when it passes the start point. At the end of the stage, there are two sets of markers. The first is usually referred to as the flying finish, and is the point at which timing for the stage ends. The name comes from the fact that a car will be travelling at full racing speeds when it passes this post. Several hundred meters further along the stage is the stop control point, where the car must come to a halt in order for officials to record their time and check paperwork. Approximately 50 meters after the stop point is the end of the special stage restrictions.

The cars must travel between special stages on public roads, often known as transport stages. While on public roads, all local traffic laws must be obeyed, so all cars must be roadworthy and taxed and insured. Drivers may be given a scheduled time to arrive at their destination to ensure they do not speed during the journey, with penalties for arriving too soon or too late (although the margin for late arrival is quite large).

== Super special stage ==
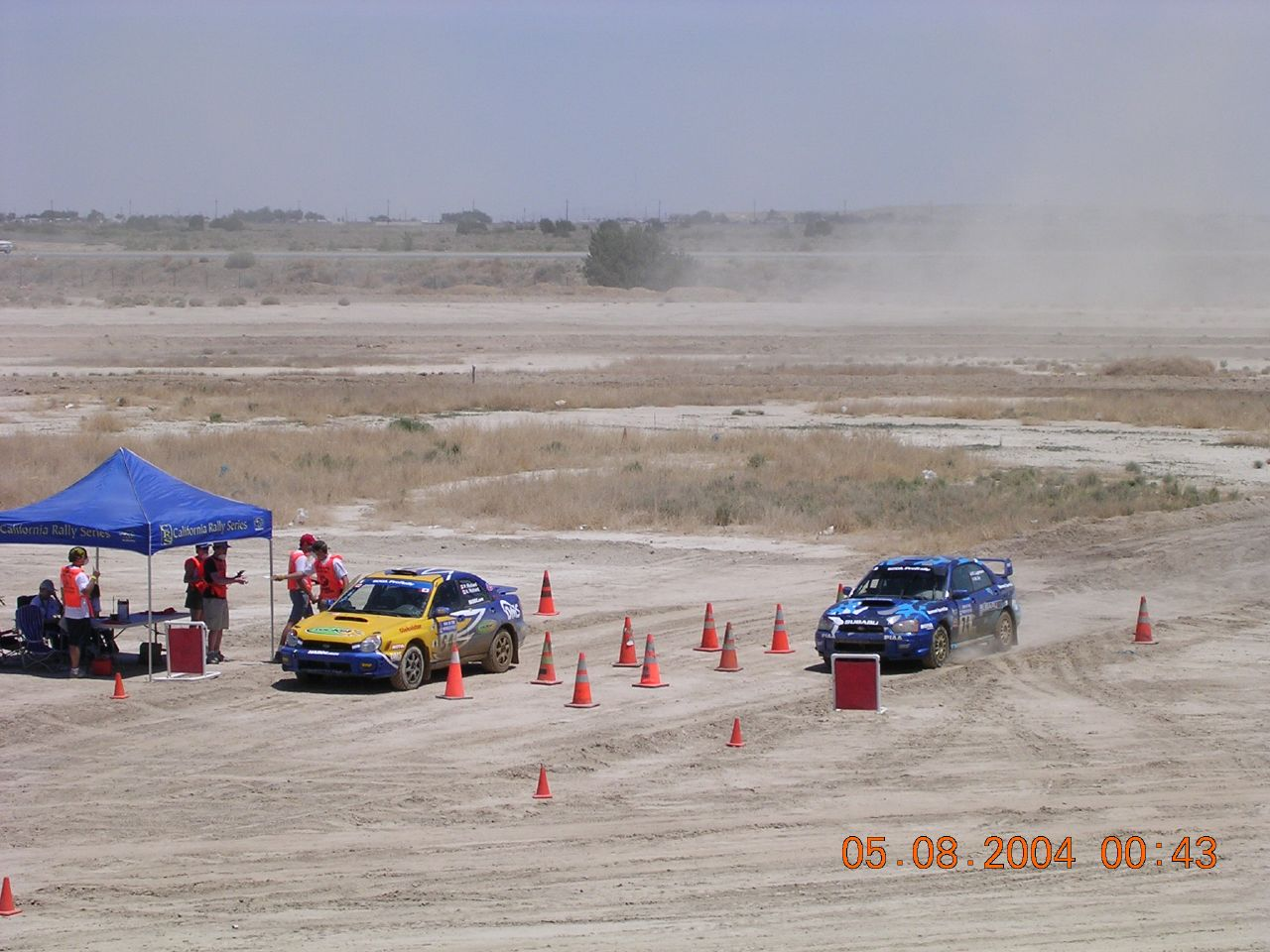
Start line of a head-to-head format super special stage

So called super special stages are when the ordinary running of a special stage differs to the character of the rally. There are many potential reasons why and the supplementary regulations for a stage rally must explain for the competitors to understand. Typical examples include where:

- there is a change in surface type such as an asphalt stage on a gravel rally
- two cars start simultaneously at different points of a looped stage in a head-to-head format
- the running order of competitors may be altered for promotional or spectator purposes
- the starting intervals are irregular

== See also ==
- Rallycross
