= Vello Õunpuu =

Estonian rally driver (1949–2022)

Personal information
- Nationality: (Estonia) Estonian
- Born: 14 November 1949; Kuressaare, then part of Estonian SSR, Soviet Union
- Died: 12 February 2022 (aged 72)

World Rally Championship record
- Years active: 1982–1983
- Co-driver: (Estonia) Aarne Timusk
- Rallies: 2
- Championships: 0
- Rally wins: 0
- Podiums: 0
- Stage wins: 0
- Total points: 0
- First rally: 1982 RAC Rally
- Last rally: 1983 RAC Rally

Vello Õunpuu (14 November 1949 – 12 February 2022) was an Estonian rally driver. He participated in European Rally Championship and in the World Rally Championship. From 1980 to 1986 he was part of the Soviet Union Team.

Vello won his home event Saaremaa Rally three times in 1977, 1980 and 1981. He died on 12 February 2022, when he was 72 years old. He was part of the Estonian rally documentary Legends of the Winding Road, but died before the film's release.

== Career ==
Vello Õunpuu started rallying in 1975 in Tehumardi Rally in Saaremaa with co-driver Ivo Vaher. In 1977, he won the Estonian Championship snow race in Tallinn Hippodrome, driving with pick-up Moskvitch.

He won Tehumardi Rally three times 1977, 1980 and 1981. In 1978 he won his first medal in Estonian Rally Championship finishing in second place.

In 1978, Rally Põlva was first rally for him with new co-driver Aarne Timusk, which became very successful crew. Their first foreign rally was in Romania, in spring 1979.

Õunpuu participated 14 times in the European Rally Championship, the best achievement was third place at the Czech "Tatra Rally" in 1982.

In 1982, Õunpuu and Timusk won the Rallye Russkaya Zima the first rally of the Rally Cup of Peace and Friendship season, which was held near Moscow. At the end of the season they became first Estonian crew to win Friendship Cup, last season they finished second.

Started twice in the RAC Rally in the World Rally Championship, both appearances ended in retirement. The 1982 British rally is notable for the fact that the Lada 2105 VFTS, the first and only Soviet Group B car, was shown on the international stage for the first time. Õunpuu was one of two pilots who were entrusted with launching this car.

== Racing Record ==
=== Complete WRC results ===
Year	Entrant	Car	1	2	3	4	5	6	7	8	9	10	11	12	WDC	Points
1982	Vello Õunpuu	Lada VAZ 2105 VFTS	MON	SWE	POR	KEN	FRA	GRC	NZL	BRA	FIN	ITA	CIV	GBR; Ret	N/A	0
1983	Vello Õunpuu	Lada VAZ 2105 VFTS	MON	SWE	POR	KEN	FRA	GRC	NZL	ARG	FIN	ITA	CIV	GBR; Ret	N/A	0

=== Complete CoPaF results ===
Year	Entrant	Car	1	2	3	4	5	6	7	WDC	Points
1981	Vello Õunpuu	Lada VAZ 21011	SAC; 9	ALB; Ret	VOL; 10	DAN; 9	TAT; 14	RUS; 4		2nd	179
1982	Vello Õunpuu	Lada VAZ 21011	RUS; 1	ALB; 5	MEC; 9	DAN	POK	TAT; 2	WAR; 7	1st	210
