= VFTS =

VFTS may stand for:

- VLT FLAMES Tarantula Survey of massive stars in the Tarantula Nebula
- Views (album), Originally titled Views From The Six
- Lada VFTS - a rally car based on Lada 2105
