= 2020 Estonian Rally Championship =

Champions
- Estonian Drivers' Champion: Georg Gross
- Estonian Co-drivers' Champion: Raigo Mõlder

Seasons
- ← 2019 2021 →

The 2020 Estonian Rally Championship was the sixty-second season of the Estonian Rally Championship.

The championship was heavily affected by the COVID-19 pandemic. There was eight events planned prior to the pandemic, but with several events being cancelled due to the pandemic.

At the conclusion of the championship, Gross and Mõlder won their fourth championship title. They were driving with Ford Fiesta WRC for OT Racing.

== Calendar ==
Round	Start date	Finish date	Rally	Surface	Stages	Distance	Ref
1	4 July	4 July	(Estonia) Grossi Toidukaubad Viru Rally	Gravel, Tarmac	7	88.40 km	
2	23 August	23 August	(Estonia) RedGrey Lõuna-Eesti Rally	Gravel, Tarmac	8	101.50 km	
3	4 September	5 September	Rally Estonia National Day 1	Gravel, Tarmac	11	148.46 km	
4	6 September	6 September	Rally Estonia National Day 2	Gravel, Tarmac	6	84.94 km	
5	9 October	10 October	(Estonia) Saaremaa Rally	Gravel	9	102.34 km	

== Results and standings ==
Rally Estonia Day 1 and Day 2 were counted only in EMV2 championship not in the absolute championship.

=== Season summary ===
Round	Event	Winning driver	Winning co-driver	Winning entrant	Winning time	Ref
1	(Estonia) Grossi Toidukaubad Viru Rally	(Estonia) Georg Gross	(Estonia) Raigo Mõlder	(Estonia) OT Racing	47:57.7	
2	(Estonia) RedGrey Lõuna-Eesti Rally	(Estonia) Georg Gross	(Estonia) Raigo Mõlder	(Estonia) OT Racing	52:02.9	
3	Rally Estonia National Day 1					
4	Rally Estonia National Day 2					
5	(Estonia) Saaremaa Rally	(Estonia) Georg Gross	(Estonia) Raigo Mõlder	(Estonia) OT Racing	52:36.3	

=== Scoring system ===
Position	1st	2nd	3rd	4th	5th	6th	7th	8th	9th	10th	11th	12th	13th	14th	15th	16th	17th	18th	19th	20th	21st	22nd	23rd	24th	25th	26th	27th	28th	29th	30th	31st	32nd	33rd	34th	35th	36th	37th	38th	39th	40th
Points	100	79	67	60	55	51	48	46	45	44	43	42	41	40	39	38	37	36	35	34	33	32	31	30	29	28	27	26	25	24	23	22	21	20	19	18	17	16	15	14

=== Estonian Rally Championship for Drivers ===
Pos	Driver	VIR (Estonia)	LÕU (Estonia)	RE1 (Estonia)	RE2 (Estonia)	SAA (Estonia)	Points
1	(Estonia) Georg Gross	1	1			1	300
2	(Estonia) Egon Kaur	2	2			3	225
3	(Estonia) Raul Jeets	3	5			4	182
4	(Estonia) Georg Linnamäe	13	3			2	168
5	(Estonia) Priit Koik	6	4			18	147
6	(Estonia) Marko Ringenberg	7	9			10	137
7	(Estonia) Robert Virves	8	7			17	131
8	(Latvia) Edgars Balodis	11	11			16	124
9	(Estonia) Gregor Jeets	12	12			20	118
10	(Estonia) Roland Murakas	5				5	110
11	(Estonia) Mart Tikkerbär	20	16			19	107
12	(Estonia) Ranno Bundsen	Ret	6			6	102
13	(Estonia) David Sultanjants	23	21			24	95
14	(Poland) Mikołaj Kempa		10			7	92
15	(Estonia) Hendrik Kers		8			9	91
