= 1997 Estonian Rally Championship =

Champions
- A, E 2000+ Drivers' Champion: Markko Märtin
- A, E 2000+ Co-drivers' Champion: Toomas Kitsing
- N 2000+ Drivers' Champion: Ivar Raidam
- N 2000+ Co-drivers' Champion: Margus Karjane

Seasons
- ← 1996 1998 →

The 1997 Estonian Rally Championship was the thirty-ninth season of the Estonian Rally Championship.

At the conclusion of the championship, Ivar Raidam and Margus Karjane won the N 2000+ championship driving with Mitsubishi Lancer Evo III. Markko Märtin won the A, E 2000+ championship together with Toomas Kitsing.

== Calendar ==
Round	Start date	Finish date	Rally	Surface	Stages	Distance	Ref
1	10 January	11 January	(Estonia) Estonian Winter Rally	Snow	8	94.95 km	
2	16 May	17 May	(Estonia) Tallinn EK Rally	Gravel	11	154.84 km	
3	27 June	28 June	(Estonia) Valge Daam	Gravel	12	108.80 km	
4	18 July	19 July	(Estonia) Livonia Ralli	Gravel	20	191.45 km	
5	12 September	13 September	(Estonia) Lõuna-Eesti Rally	Gravel	14	186.16 km	
6	31 October	1 November	(Estonia) Saaremaa Ralli	Gravel	9	122.19 km	

== Results and standings ==
=== Season summary ===
Round	Event	Winning driver	Winning co-driver	Winning entrant	Winning time	Ref
1	(Estonia) Estonian Winter Rally	(Estonia) Ivar Raidam	(Estonia) Margus Karjane	(Estonia) Harju KEK Ralliklubi	58:25	
2	(Estonia) Tallinn EK Rally	(Estonia) Riho Parts	(Estonia) Aare Kaaristo	(Estonia) EMEX	1:12:33	
3	(Estonia) Valge Daam	(Estonia) Ivar Raidam	(Estonia) Margus Karjane	(Estonia) Harju KEK Ralliklubi	1:00:17	
4	(Estonia) Livonia Ralli	(Estonia) Markko Märtin	(Estonia) Toomas Kitsing	(Estonia) EK	1:40:05	
5	(Estonia) Lõuna-Eesti Rally	(Estonia) Markko Märtin	(Estonia) Toomas Kitsing	(Estonia) EK Finest	1:28:49	
6	(Estonia) Saaremaa Rally	(Estonia) Markko Märtin	(Estonia) Toomas Kitsing	(Estonia) EK Finest	1:04:26	

=== Scoring system ===
Position	1st	2nd	3rd	4th	5th	6th
Points	9	6	4	3	2	1

=== A, E 2000+ Championship for Drivers ===
Pos	Driver	EWR (Estonia)	TER (Estonia)	VAL (Estonia)	LIV (Estonia)	LÕU (Estonia)	SAA (Estonia)	Points
1	(Estonia) Markko Märtin			1	1	1	1	36
2	(Estonia) Dmitri Mälsom	3	3	2	2	Ret	Ret	20
3	(Finland) Saku Vierimaa	1	2					15
4	(Finland) Pasi Hagström		1					9
5	(Estonia) Erki Piirsalu	2						6
6	(Lithuania) Rokas Lipeikis						2	6

=== N 2000+ Championship for Drivers ===
Pos	Driver	EWR (Estonia)	TER (Estonia)	VAL (Estonia)	LIV (Estonia)	LÕU (Estonia)	SAA (Estonia)	Points
1	(Estonia) Ivar Raidam	1	1	1	1	1	NC	45
2	(Estonia) Riho Parts	2	2	2	2	NC	1	33
3	(Estonia) Margus Murakas	Ret	6	3	4	3	3	16
4	(Estonia) Aleksander Käo		3	5	3	4	4	16
5	(Estonia) Mait Meriloo		7	4	5	5	5	13
6	(Estonia) Aivo Hintser	3						4
