= Legends of the Winding Roads =

Legends of the Winding Roads Kurvilise tee legendid
- Directed by: Tarvo Mölder
- Written by: Kaidi Klein
- Produced by: Eero Nõgene; Sterotek Film
- Starring: Vello Õunpuu; Vallo Soots; Ilmar Raissar; Hardi Mets; Ott Tänak; Markko Märtin
- Narrated by: Evelin Võigemast
- Release date: April 25, 2023
- Running time: 132 minutes
- Country: Estonia
- Languages: Estonian; Russian

Legends of the Winding Roads (Estonian: Kurvilise tee legendid) is a 2023 documentary film directed by Tarvo Mölder about the Estonian rally drivers in the 1980s.

The film was chosen to International Sport Film Festival in Italy, to St Andrews Festival in Scotland and to IDFA Festival 2023 in Netherland.

== Plot ==
The film revolves around Estonian rally drivers who were under the shadow of the Soviet occupation, and the restoration of four Soviet-era Lada rally cars driven by those drivers, whose dream was to be part of the national rally team where they were given the opportunity for them to see the world beyond the authoritarian confines of the Iron Curtain.

Though the Soviet Union covered nearly one-sixth of the Earth's land and was made up of fifteen constituent republics, most of the drivers in the Soviet Rally Team were from the smallest republic of them all, Estonia.

== Cast ==
- Vello Õunpuu
- Vallo Soots
- Hardi Mets
- Ilmar Raissar
- Joel Tammeka
- Toomas Diener
- Raido Rüütel
- Ott Tänak
- Markko Märtin

== Release ==
=== Marketing ===
The trailer was released by Sterotek Film via YouTube on October 7, 2022, and was released theatrically in Estonia on April 26, 2023. The film was also released worldwide through Netikino.ee, an Estonian video-on-demand service, on July 21, 2023.
