= Saaremaa Rally =

Rallying competition held in Estonia

Saaremaa Rally Saaremaa Ralli
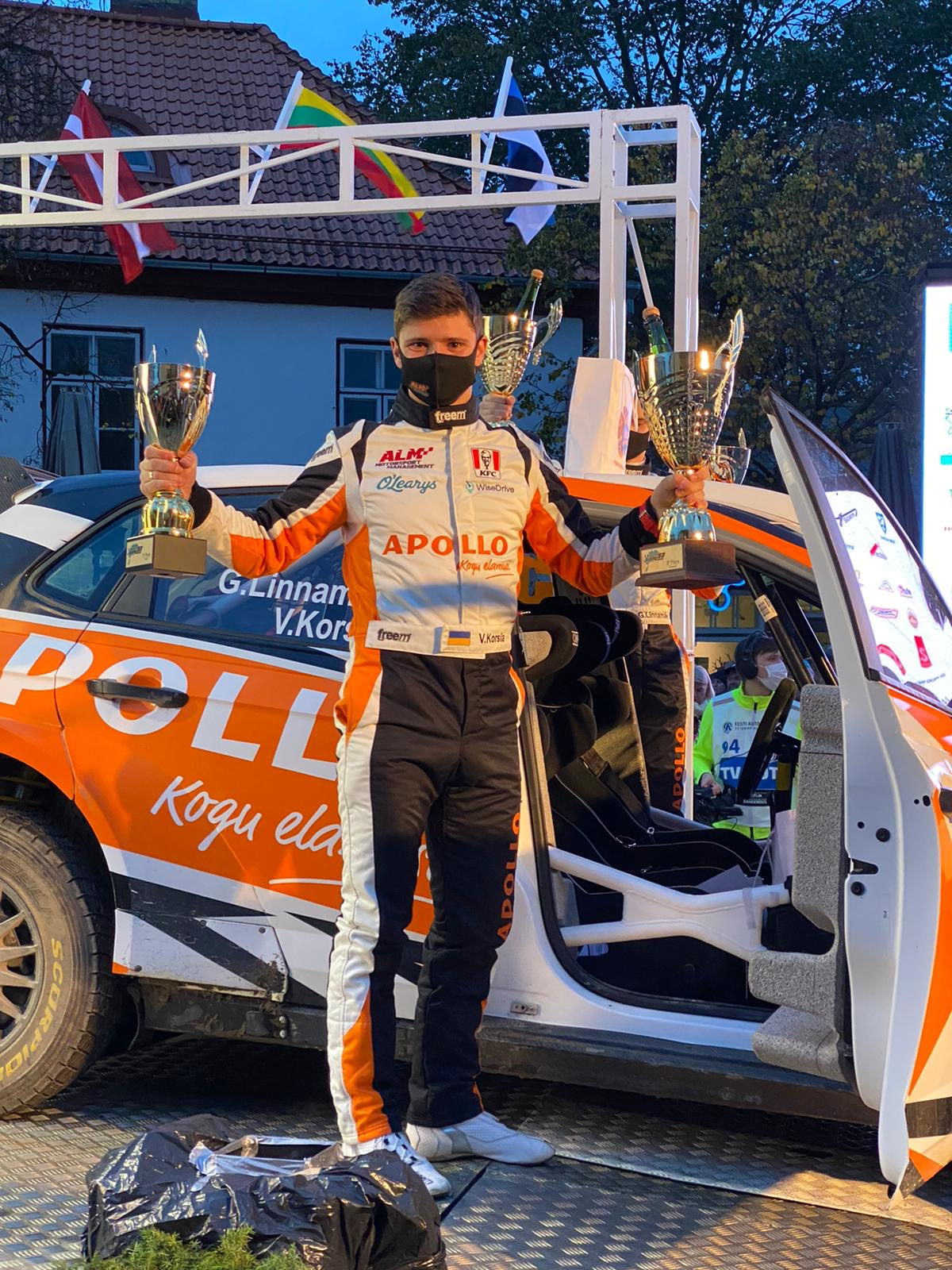
- Status: active
- Genre: motorsporting event
- Date: October
- Frequency: annual
- Location: Saare County
- Country: Estonia
- Inaugurated: 1974
- Website: saaremaarally.eu

Saaremaa Rally (Estonian: Saaremaa ralli) is an annual rally competition held in Saare County, Estonia. The rally is part of the Estonian Rally Championship.

The first competition was held in 1974.

== Winners ==
Year	Driver	Co-driver	Car
1974	(Estonian Soviet Socialist Republic) Toonart Rääsk	(Estonian Soviet Socialist Republic) Urmas Silm	Lada VAZ 2101
1975	(Estonian Soviet Socialist Republic) Valter Hännikäinen	(Estonian Soviet Socialist Republic) Meinhard Paas	
1976	(Estonian Soviet Socialist Republic) Raivo Sareal	(Estonian Soviet Socialist Republic) Toonart Rääsk	
1977	(Estonian Soviet Socialist Republic) Vello Õunpuu	(Estonian Soviet Socialist Republic) Ivo Vaher	
1978	(Estonian Soviet Socialist Republic) Endel Kabral	(Estonian Soviet Socialist Republic) Arvo Rebane	
1979	(Estonian Soviet Socialist Republic) Endel Kabral	(Estonian Soviet Socialist Republic) Arvo Rebane	Lada VAZ 2106
1980	(Estonian Soviet Socialist Republic) Vello Õunpuu	(Estonian Soviet Socialist Republic) Aarne Timusk	Lada VAZ 21011
1981	(Estonian Soviet Socialist Republic) Vello Õunpuu	(Estonian Soviet Socialist Republic) Aarne Timusk	Lada VAZ 21011
1982	(Estonian Soviet Socialist Republic) Enn Jõemägi	(Estonian Soviet Socialist Republic) Tiit Sepp	Lada VAZ 2105
1983	(Estonian Soviet Socialist Republic) Aavo Pikkuus	(Estonian Soviet Socialist Republic) Lehar Linno	Lada VAZ 21011
1984	(Estonian Soviet Socialist Republic) Ilmar Raissar	(Estonian Soviet Socialist Republic) Rein Talvar	Lada VAZ 21011
1985	(Estonian Soviet Socialist Republic) Enn Jõemägi	(Estonian Soviet Socialist Republic) Tiit Sepp	Lada VAZ 2105 VFTS
1986	(Estonian Soviet Socialist Republic) Rain Aava	(Estonian Soviet Socialist Republic) Erbert Kalaus	Lada VAZ 2101
1987	(Estonian Soviet Socialist Republic) Joel Tammeka	(Estonian Soviet Socialist Republic) Ants Kulgevee	Lada VAZ 2105 VFTS
1988	(Estonian Soviet Socialist Republic) Joel Tammeka	(Estonian Soviet Socialist Republic) Ants Kulgevee	Lada VAZ 2105 VFTS
1989	(Estonian Soviet Socialist Republic) Raul Viik	(Estonian Soviet Socialist Republic) Toomas Valter	Lada Samara 21083
1990	(Estonian Soviet Socialist Republic) Ilmar Raissar	(Estonian Soviet Socialist Republic) Rein Talvar	Lada VAZ 2105 VFTS
1991	(Estonia) Ivar Raidam	(Estonia) Margus Karjane	Lada Samara 21083
1992	(Estonia) Ivar Raidam	(Estonia) Margus Karjane	Lada Samara 21083
1993	(Finland) Eija Jurvanen	(Finland) Tomi Tuominen	Ford Sierra RS Cosworth 4x4
1994	(Estonia) Ivar Raidam	(Estonia) Margus Karjane	Ford Escort RS Cosworth
1995	(Finland) Sebastian Lindholm	(Finland) Pertti Lahtinen	Ford Escort RS Cosworth
1996	(Finland) Sebastian Lindholm	(Finland) Pertti Lahtinen	Ford Escort RS Cosworth
1997	(Estonia) Markko Märtin	(Estonia) Toomas Kitsing	Toyota Celica Turbo 4WD
1998	(Estonia) Ivar Raidam	(Estonia) Robert Lepikson	Mitsubishi Lancer Evo III
1999	(Estonia) Ivar Raidam	(Estonia) Robert Lepikson	Mitsubishi Lancer Evo VI
2000	(Estonia) Aleksander Käo	(Estonia) Aare Ojamäe	Mitsubishi Lancer Evo IV
2001	(Estonia) Margus Murakas	(Estonia) Toomas Kitsing	Toyota Corolla WRC
2002	(Estonia) Margus Murakas	(Estonia) Toomas Kitsing	Toyota Corolla WRC
2003	(Norway) Thomas Schie	(Norway) Ragnar Engen	Toyota Corolla WRC
2004	(Norway) Thomas Schie	(Norway) Ragnar Engen	Toyota Corolla WRC
2005	(Finland) Juho Hänninen	(Finland) Marko Sallinen	Mitsubishi Lancer Evo VIII
2006	(Norway) Andreas Mikkelsen	(Norway) Ola Fløene	Ford Focus WRC 05
2007	(Estonia) Rainer Aus	(Estonia) Kristo Kraag	Subaru Impreza STi N12
2008	(Estonia) Ott Tänak	(Estonia) Raigo Mõlder	Subaru Impreza STi N14
2009	(Estonia) Georg Gross	(Estonia) Kristo Kraag	Ford Focus WRC 03
2010	(Norway) Mads Østberg	(Sweden) Jonas Andersson	Subaru Impreza S12B WRC '07
2011	(Estonia) Ott Tänak	(Estonia) Kuldar Sikk	Ford Focus WRC 03
2012	(Russia) Alexey Lukyanuk	(Russia) Alexey Arnautov	Mitsubishi Lancer Evo X R4
2013	(Estonia) Georg Gross	(Estonia) Raigo Mõlder	Ford Focus WRC 08
2014	(Estonia) Timmu Kõrge	(Estonia) Erki Pints	Ford Fiesta R5
2015	(Estonia) Egon Kaur	(Estonia) Annika Arnek	Mitsubishi Lancer Evo IX
2016	(Estonia) Siim Plangi	(Estonia) Marek Sarapuu	Mitsubishi Lancer Evo X
2017	(Estonia) Ott Tänak	(Estonia) Georg Gross	Ford Fiesta RS WRC
2018	(Estonia) Georg Gross	(Estonia) Raigo Mõlder	Ford Fiesta WRC
2019	(Estonia) Georg Gross	(Estonia) Raigo Mõlder	Ford Fiesta WRC
2020	(Estonia) Georg Gross	(Estonia) Raigo Mõlder	Ford Fiesta WRC
2021	(Estonia) Georg Gross	(Estonia) Raigo Mõlder	Ford Fiesta WRC
2022	(Estonia) Egon Kaur	(Estonia) Silver Simm	Volkswagen Polo GTI R5
2023	(Estonia) Ott Tänak	(Estonia) Robert Virves	Ford Fiesta R5 Mk. II
2024	(Estonia) Ken Torn	(Estonia) Kauri Pannas	Škoda Fabia
2025			

=== Multiple winners ===
Wins	Driver	Years won
6	(Estonia) Georg Gross	2009, 2013, 2018, 2019, 2020, 2021
5	(Estonia) Ivar Raidam	1991, 1992, 1994, 1998, 1999
4	(Estonia) Ott Tänak	2008, 2011, 2017, 2023
3	(Estonia) Vello Õunpuu	1977, 1980, 1981
2	(Estonia) Endel Kabral	1978, 1979
2	(Estonia) Enn Jõemägi	1982, 1985
2	(Estonia) Ilmar Raissar	1984, 1990
2	(Estonia) Joel Tammeka	1987, 1988
2	(Finland) Sebastian Lindholm	1995, 1996
2	(Estonia) Margus Murakas	2001, 2002
2	(Norway) Thomas Schie	2003, 2004
2	(Estonia) Egon Kaur	2015, 2022

Wins	Manufacturer
15	(Russia) Lada
15	(United States) Ford
7	(Japan) Mitsubishi
5	(Japan) Toyota
3	(Japan) Subaru
