= Joel Tammeka =

Estonia rally driver

Personal information
- Nationality: (Estonia) Estonian
- Born: 11 February 1951 (age 75) Tallinn, then part of Estonian SSR, Soviet Union
- Years active: 1974 - 1992

Sport
- Country: Estonia
- Sport: Rally raid, Rallying

Joel Tammeka (born 11 February 1951) is a retired rally driver from Estonia. Tammeka is one of the few racing drivers in the Baltic states who has achieved good results competing in Dakar rally. In 1991 Dakar rally he became third in the truck class driving with Kamaz. Tammeka still holds the record for the best overall result in a truck class in the Baltics as well as for an Estonian driver.

Tammeka was part of the Soviet Union team from 1989 to 1991 and was driving for the Kamaz team in 1991 Paris-Dakar Rally. At the 1991 Dakar rally, while he was holding second place, he was given orders from the Kamaz team to let Russian Goltsov crew ahead and finished behind them in third place.

Joel was part of the Estonian historic rally film Legends of the Winding Roads.

== Achievements ==
- 1982 - USSR Rally Championship: 1st place.
- 1983 - Rally Finland: 1st place in B10 class.
- 1984 - USSR Rally Championship: 3rd place.
- 1991 - Dakar Rally: 3rd place in trucks class.

== Racing record ==
=== WRC results ===
| Year | Entrant | Car | 1 | 2 | 3 | 4 | 5 | 6 | 7 | 8 | 9 | 10 | 11 | 12 | 13 | WDC | Points |
|---|---|---|---|---|---|---|---|---|---|---|---|---|---|---|---|---|---|
| 1983 | Lada | Lada VAZ 2105 VFTS | MON | SWE | POR | KEN | FRA | GRC | NZL | ARG | FIN; 43 | ITA | CIV | GBR | | NC | 0 |
| 1984 | V/O Autosport | Lada VAZ 2105 VFTS | MON | SWE | POR | KEN | FRA | GRC | NZL | ARG | FIN; Ret | ITA | CIV | GBR | | NC | 0 |
| 1987 | Lada | Lada VAZ 2105 VFTS | MON | SWE | POR | KEN | FRA | GRE | USA | NZL | ARG | FIN; 22 | CIV | ITA | GBR | NC | 0 |

== Dakar results ==
| Year | Class | Vehicle | Position | Stages won |
|---|---|---|---|---|
| 1991 | Trucks | (Russia) Kamaz | 3rd | ? |
