= Group B =

Motorsport regulation for cars

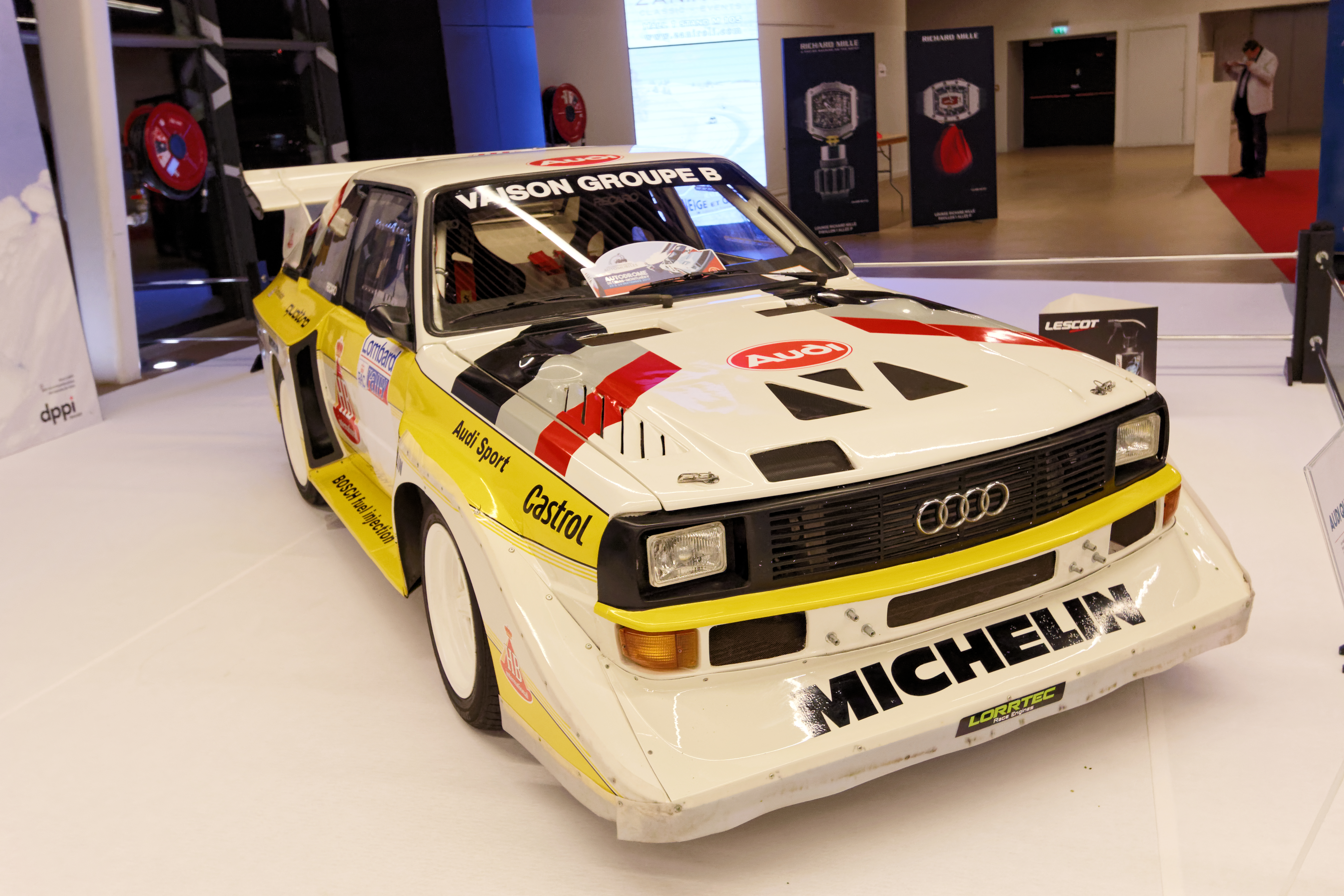
An Audi Sport Quattro S1 E2, one of the most powerful Group B cars

Group B was a set of regulations for grand touring (GT) cars used in sports car racing and rallying introduced in 1982 by the Fédération Internationale de l'Automobile (FIA). Although permitted to enter a GT class of the World Sportscar Championship alongside the faster and more popular Group C prototypes, Group B cars are commonly associated with international rallying during 1982 to 1986, when they were the highest class used in the World Rally Championship (WRC) and regional and national rally championships.

The Group B regulations fostered some of the fastest, most powerful, and most sophisticated rally cars ever built, and their era is commonly referred to as the golden era of rallying. However, a series of major and fatal accidents occurred amid ongoing concerns over unchecked evolution of the cars' performance abilities, the rally itineraries and lack of crowd control at events. Immediately after the deaths of Henri Toivonen and his co-driver Sergio Cresto in the 1986 Tour de Corse, the FIA banned the group from competing in the WRC from the following season, also dropping its prior plans to introduce Group S whilst designating Group A as the top class of rally cars with engine limits of 2,000 cc and 300 hp (224 kW).

In the following years, ex-rally Group B cars found a niche in the European Rallycross Championship until being dropped in 1993. By 1991, the World Sportscar Championship had moved on from Group B and C, with the GT championships formed in the 1990s preferring other classes such as the new GT1. The last Group B cars were homologated in 1993, though the FIA made provisions for national championships and domestic racing until as late as 2011.

== Overview ==
=== New FISA groups ===
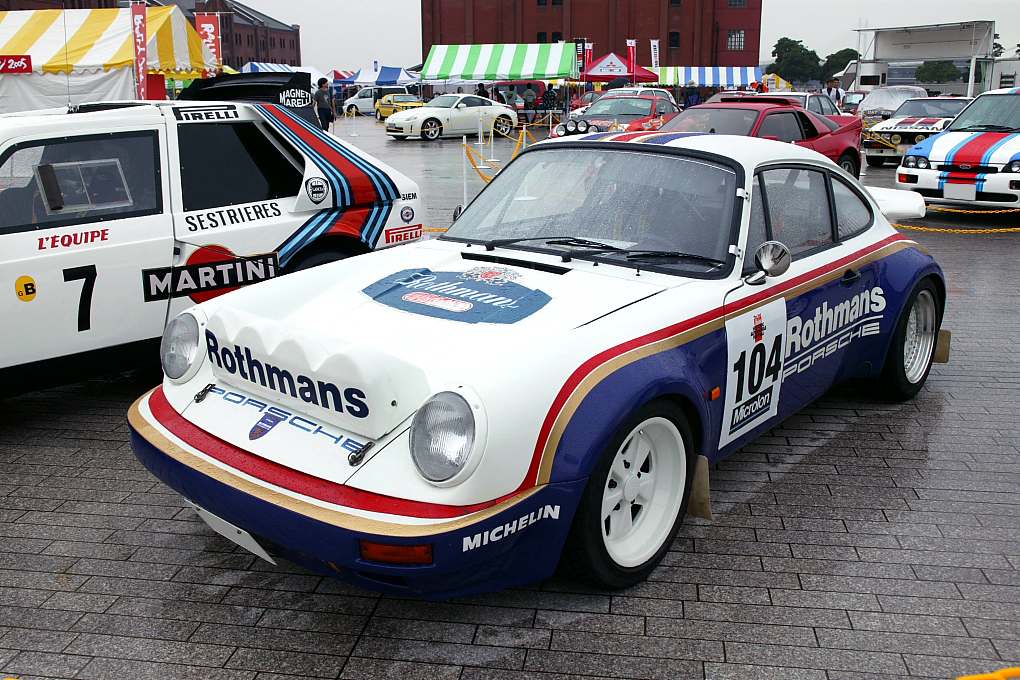
Rothmans Rally Team's Prodrive-run Porsche 911 SC RS

In 1982, the Fédération Internationale du Sport Automobile (FISA) restructured the production car category of Appendix J of the International Sporting Code to consist of three new groups.

The outgoing Group 1 and Group 2 were replaced with Group N and Group A, for unmodified and modified production touring cars respectively. These cars had to have four seats (although the minimum size of the rear seats was small enough that some 2+2 cars could qualify) and be produced in large numbers. Their homologation requirement was 5,000 units in a 12-month period between 1982 and 1992. From 1993, the requirement was reduced to 2,500 units.

Group B was for GT cars with a minimum of two seats, redefined as sports grand touring cars in 1986. It combined and replaced Group 3 and Group 4, two grand touring groups already used in rallying, and the production-derived Group 5 silhouette cars used in circuit racing. Group 5 cars had never been permitted in the World Rally Championship for Manufacturers.

=== Homologation ===
The number of cars required for homologation—200—was 4% of what some other groups required, and half of what had previously been accepted in Group 4. As homologation periods could be extended by producing 10% of the initial requirement each subsequent year (20 in Group B's case compared to 500 for A and N), the group made motorsport more accessible for car manufacturers before taking the group's technicalities and performance into account. 'Evolutions' could be included within the original homologation without needing to produce a new initial run, allowing manufacturers to tweak various aspects of their competing car and produce 20 of the 'evolved' cars rather than 200. Together, these homologation rules resulted in Group B 'homologation specials'—extremely rare cars that were only produced to satisfy the homologation quota rather than for sales, if they continued to exist beyond presentation to FIA officials in the first place.

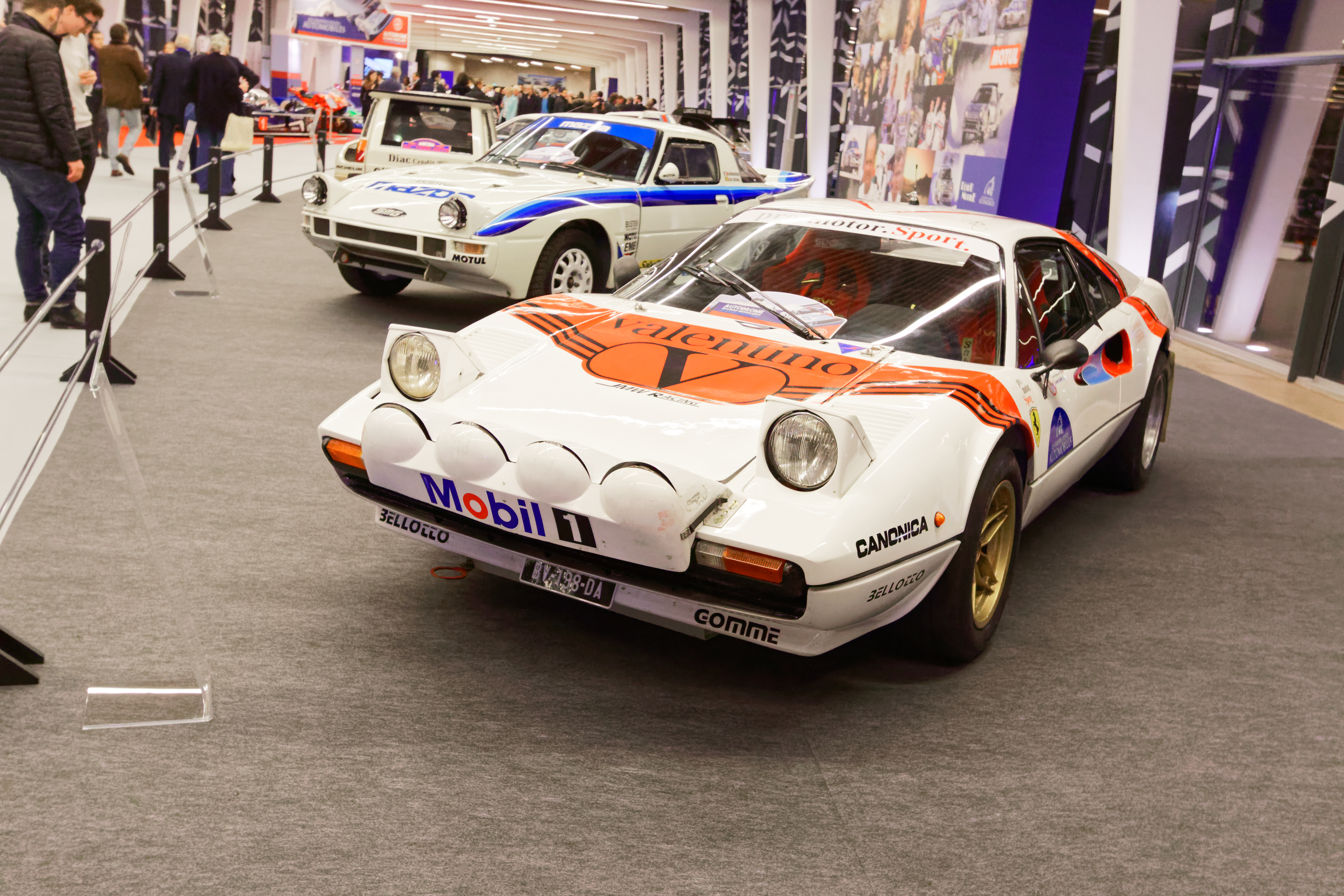
Ferrari 308 GTB Group B (1984)

Group B could be used to homologate production sports cars which were ineligible for Group N or A due to not having four seats or not being produced in large enough numbers (such as the Ferrari 308 or the Porsche 911). Furthermore, the low production requirement encouraged manufacturers to use competition-oriented space frames instead of the unibodies typically used in most series-production road cars.

Existing cars already homologated within Groups 2, 3 and 4 could be transferred to Group B, with many being automatically transferred by the FISA secretariat.

== Regulations ==
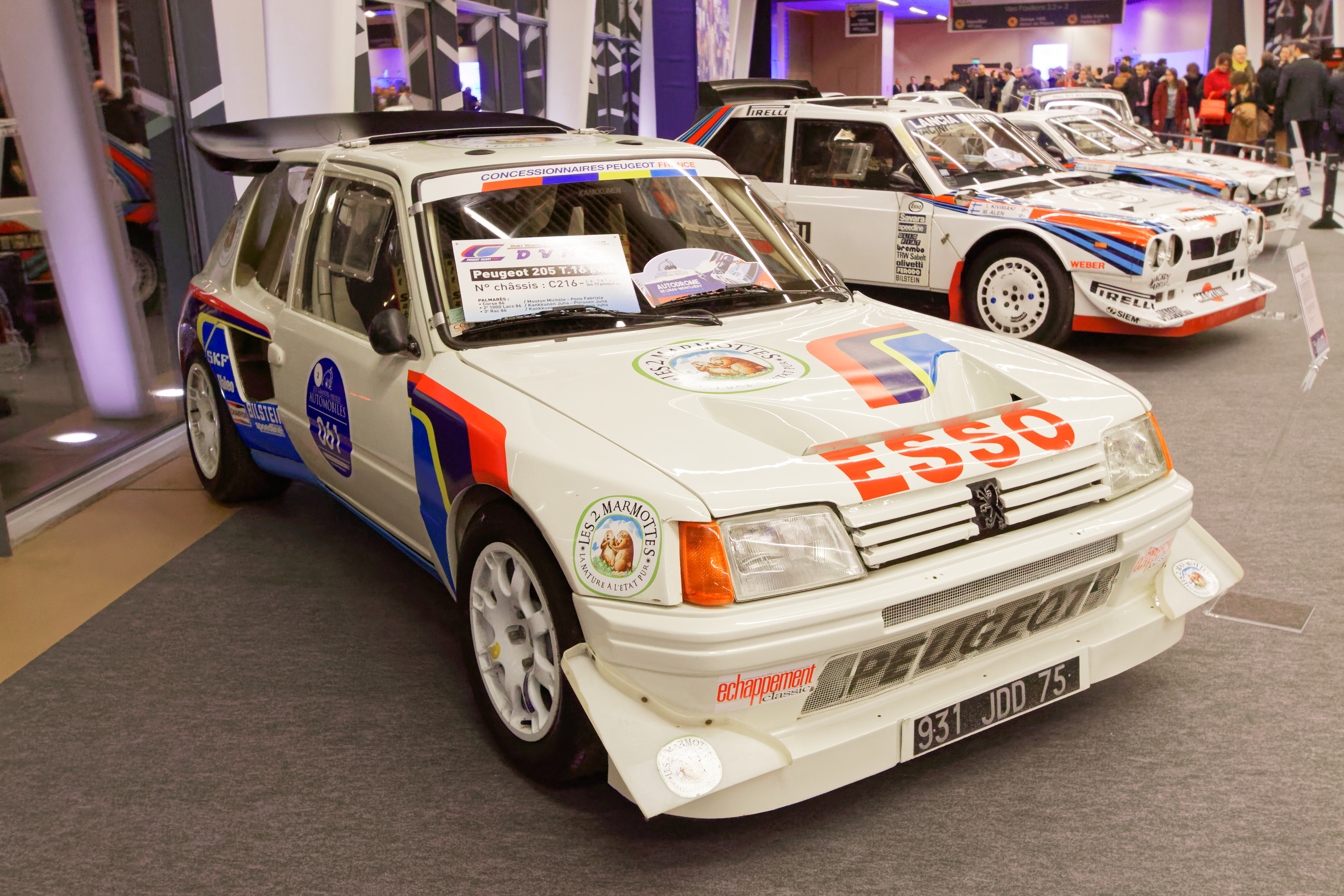
The transverse mid-engine Peugeot 205 Turbo 16 E2 won Peugeot the 1985 and 1986 WRC manufacturers' titles.

=== Specific regulations ===
Group B followed Article 252 and 253, which covered such things as safety cages or parts defining a car, like windshields or side-view mirrors. Article 256 covered regulations specific to Group B, with 5 paragraphs over half a page, and included most of the 7 pages of Article 255 for Group A. The first two paragraphs of 256 covered the definition of "(Sports) Grand Touring Cars" with a minimum of two seats, and their homologation requirements.

The section, "3) Fittings and Modifications Allowed" states, "All those allowed for Group A..." referring to the base rule set of what is allowed to be modified, how it can be modified, and what can be removed from the homologation road cars.

Group B engine capacity, weight, and tyre width limits, 1982
Maximum engine capacity (cc)	Minimum weight (kg)	Maximum tyre width (in)
1,000	580	8
1,300	675	8.5
1,600	750	9
2,000	820	10
2,500	890	11 (Note: Maximum tyre width was not specified for 2,500 cc, with the 3,000 cc limit being applied instead.)
3,000	960	11
4,000	1,100	12
5,000	1,235	13
>5,000	1,300	14

If forced induction is present, restrictions apply as though the engine capacity is 1.4 times its actual value. If the engine is a Wankel rotary or similar, then the capacity is considered to be "twice the volume determined between the maximum and minimum capacity of the combustion chamber." The equivalent capacity, $C$, for a turbine engine is much more complicated, derived with the formula $C = \frac{S(( 3.10 \times T) - 7.63) }{0.09625}$ (1982) or $C = \frac{S( 3.10 \times R) - 7.63}{0.09625}$ (1986), where $S$ is the "high pressure nozzle area" (cm^{2}), and $T$/$R$ is the "pressure ratio" of the compressor.

=== Resulting builds ===
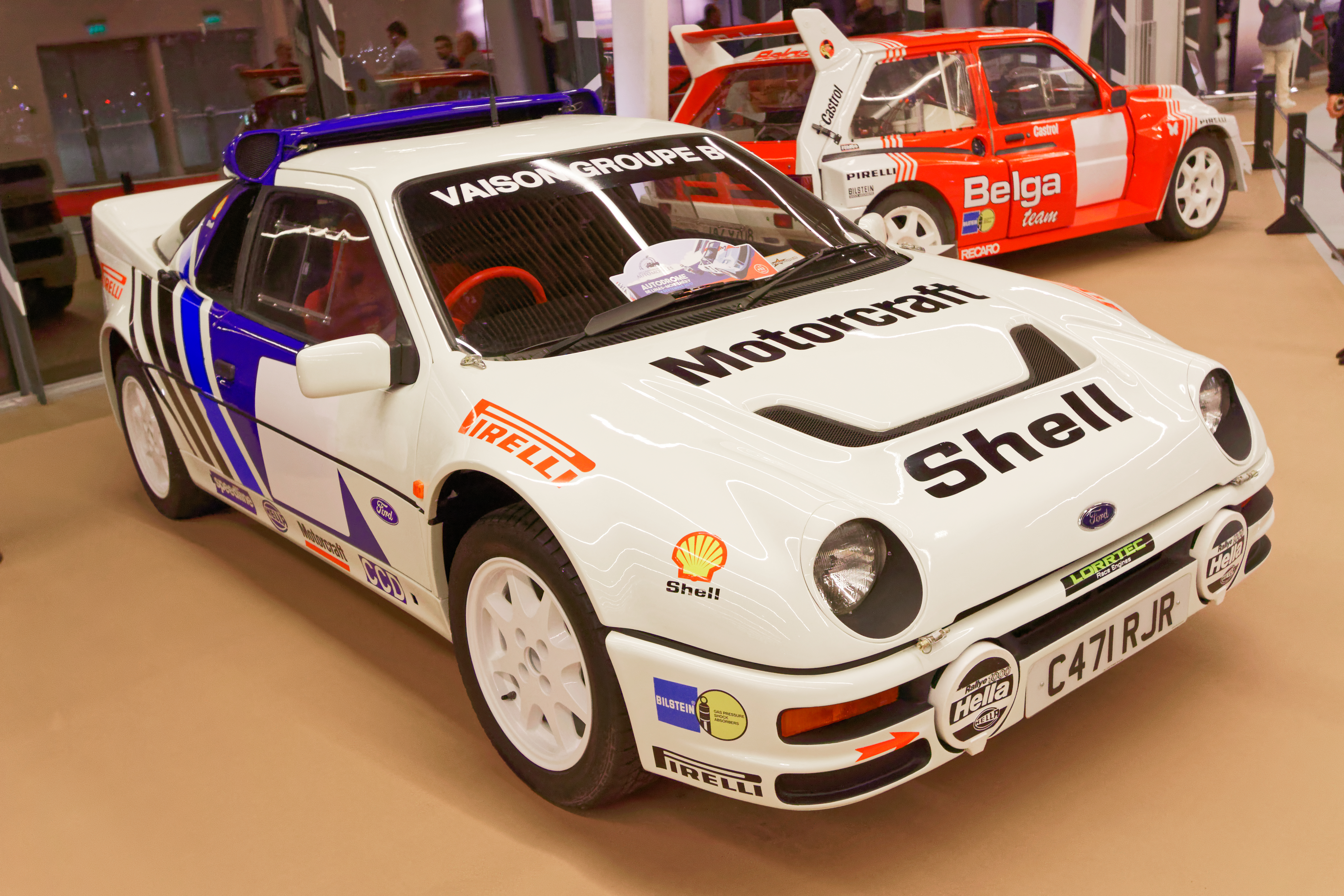
Ford RS200

Ultimately, there were few restrictions on technology, design or materials permitted. For example, fiberglass bodywork was used in the Ford RS200, a car without a common commercially available counterpart, though silhouette race cars using space frame chassis were still common even when consumer car equivalents were mass produced, for example in the case of the Peugeot 205 T16 or Lancia Delta S4. The rules provided for manufacturers who wanted to compete in rallying with mid-engine and RWD or 4WD, but their RWD production models had been gradually replaced by FWD counterparts. By reducing the homologation minimum from 400 in Group 4 to 200, FISA enabled manufacturers to design specialized RWD or 4WD homologation specials without the financial commitment of producing their production counterparts in such large numbers.

When the Group N, A, and B rules were decided upon, weight and engine displacement restrictions were thought the only way to control speed. This meant that there were no restrictions on boost, resulting in power output increasing from the winning cars' 250 hp (186 kW) in 1981 to there being at least two cars producing in excess of 500 hp (373 kW) by 1986, the final year of Group B in rally. Turbocharged engines were not yet common in road-going cars and had only been introduced in the early 1960s, but in the early and mid-1980s, engineers learned how to extract extraordinary amounts of power from turbocharging. Some Group B manufacturers went further; Peugeot, for example, installed a Formula One-derived antilag system to their engine, although the technology was new and not very effective, and Lancia twincharged their Delta S4. Nowadays, the power output of turbo engines is limited via intake restrictors, and in the Groups Rally hierarchy, each class has an explicit weight/power ratio limit.

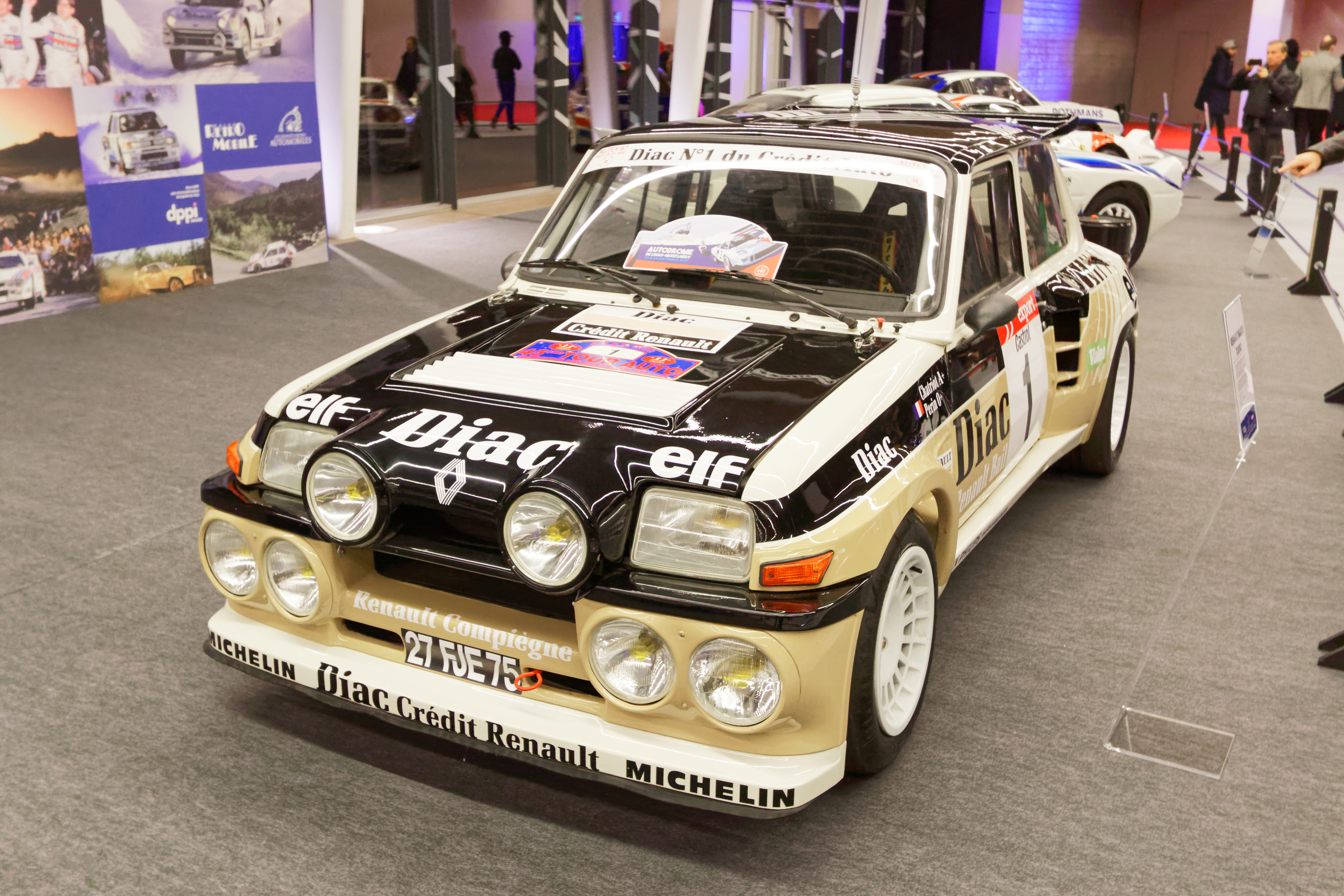
Renault 5 Turbo

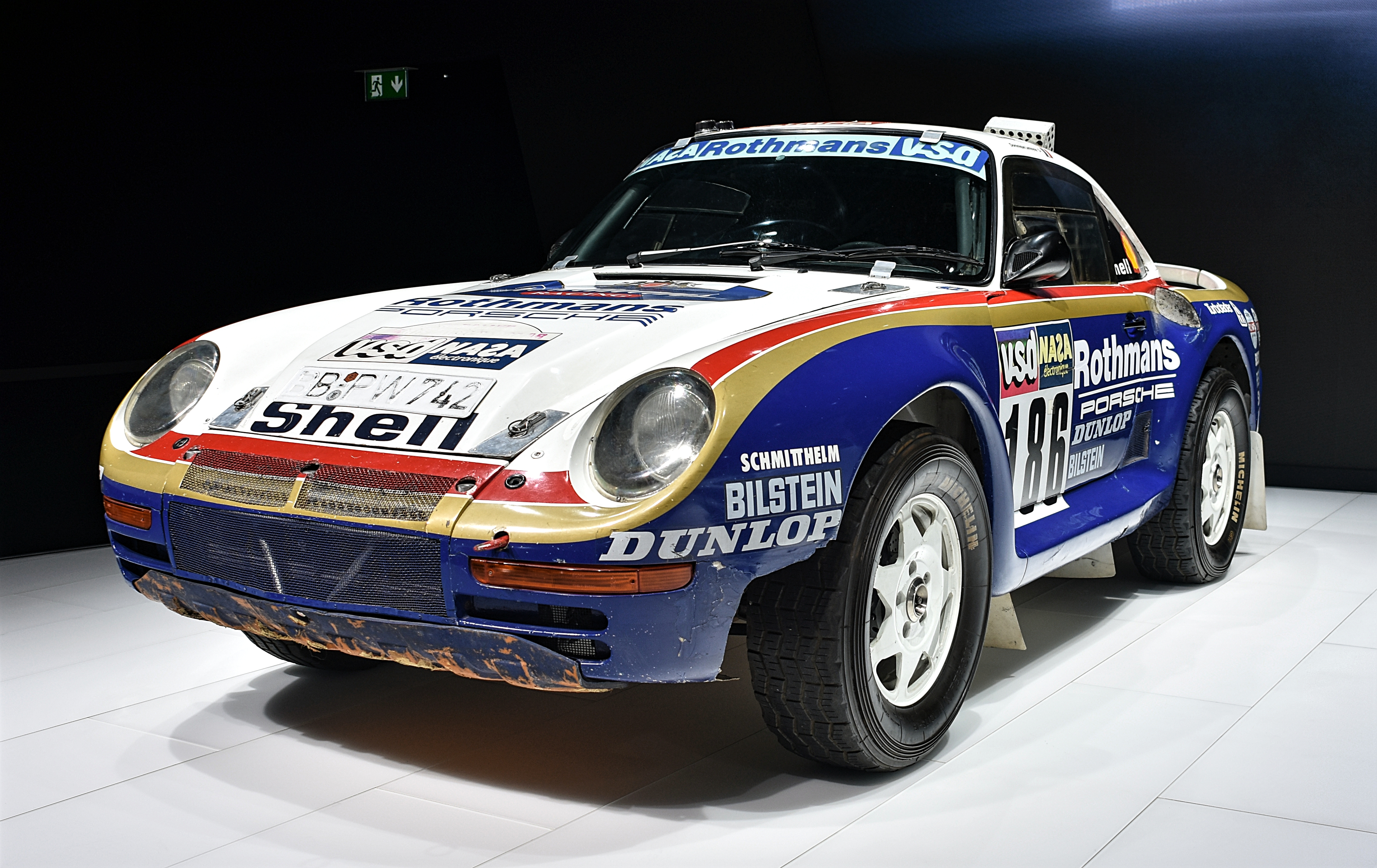
Porsche 959

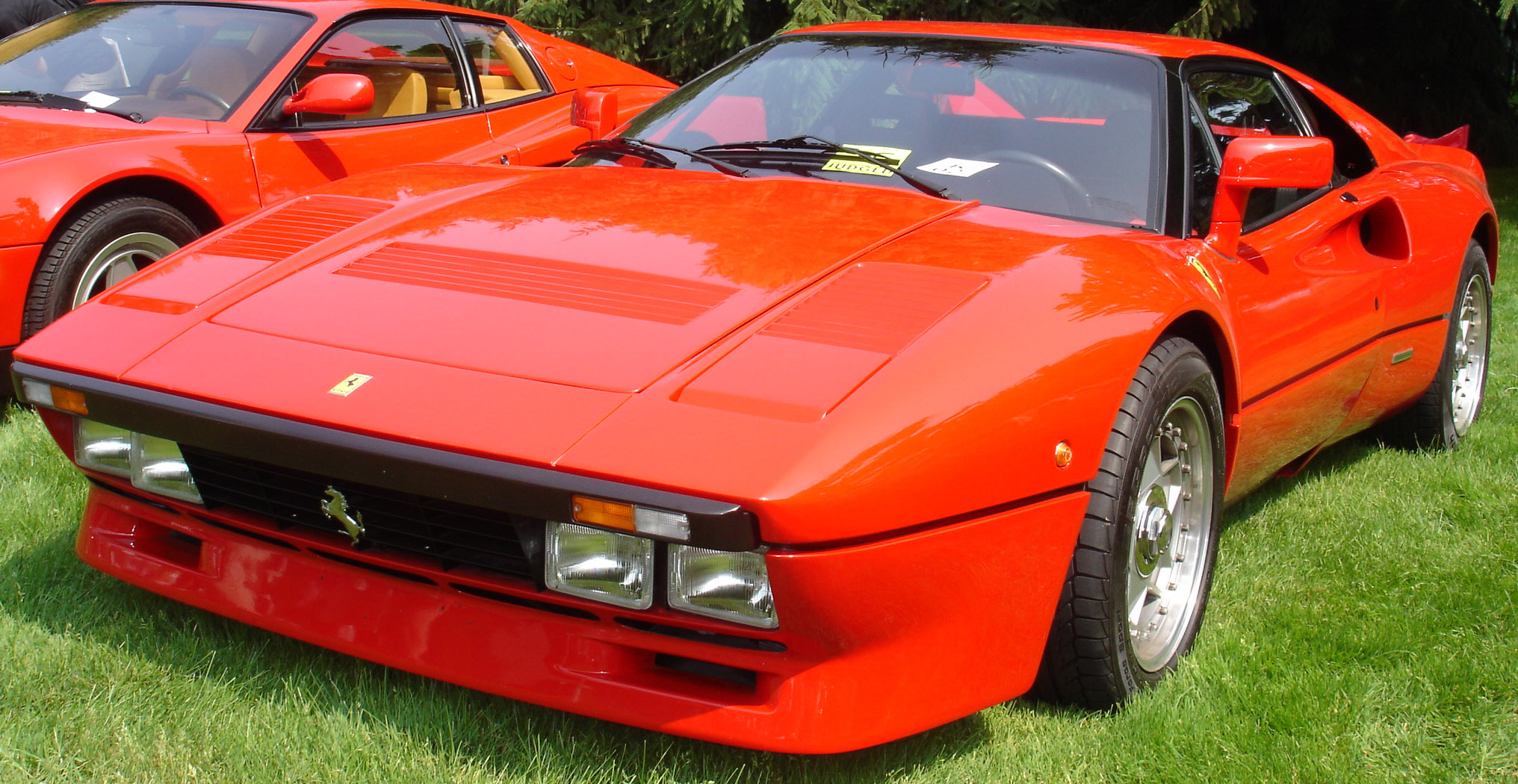
Ferrari 288 GTO

Across Groups N, A, and B, there were 15 classes based on engine displacement, with a 1.4 equivalence factor applied for forced induction engines. Each class had weight and wheel size limits. Notable classes for Group B were the 3,000 cc class (2,142.8 cc with forced induction) with a 960 kg minimum weight (Audi Quattro, Lancia 037), and the 2,500 cc class (1,785 cc with FI) with a 890 kg minimum weight (Peugeot 205 T16, Lancia Delta S4). The original Renault 5 Turbo had a turbocharged 1.4 L engine, so it was in the 2,000 cc class. Renault later increased the size of the engine somewhat for the Turbo Maxi to be able to fit larger tires (at the expense of higher weight). The Ferrari 288 GTO and the Porsche 959 were in the 4,000 cc (2857 cc with FI), 1,100 kg class, which would probably have become the normal class for circuit racing if Group B had seen much use there.

Group B subclasses
Displacement		Weight	Wheel width (front & back)	Cars
Naturally-aspirated	Supercharged or turbocharged	Weight	Wheel width (front & back)	Cars
4,000 cc	2,857 cc	1,100 kg	12"	Ferrari 288 GTO, Porsche 959
3,000 cc	2,142.8 cc	960 kg	11"	Audi Quattro, Lancia 037, MG Metro 6R4, Ford RS200
2,500 cc	1,785 cc	890 kg	11"	Peugeot 205 T16, Lancia Delta S4
2,000 cc	1,397 cc	820 kg	10"	Renault 5 Turbo

== Rallying ==
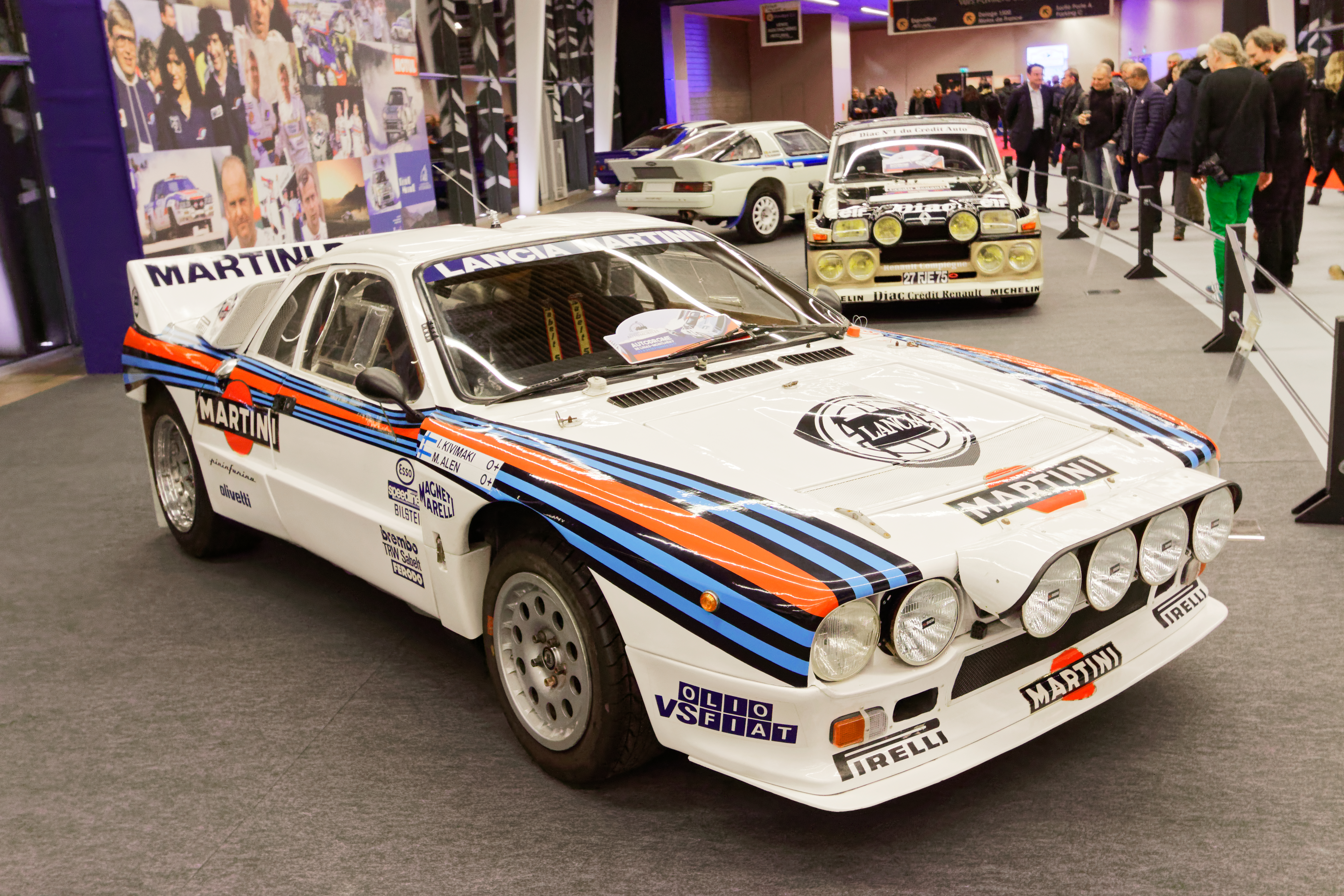
Lancia 037

=== 1982–1983 ===
The existing Groups 1–4 were still permitted in the World Rally Championship during 1982, the first year of the new groups. Although some freshly homologated Group B cars were entered from the first round in Monte Carlo, no car from the group made podium at any of the season's 12 rallies.

Although the Audi Quattro was still in essence a Group 4 car, it carried Hannu Mikkola to the driver's title in 1983. Lancia had designed a new car to Group B specifications, but the Lancia 037 still had rear-wheel drive and was thus less stable than the Quattro over loose surfaces. Nevertheless, the 037 performed well enough for Lancia to capture the manufacturers' title, which was generally considered more prestigious than the drivers' title at the time, with a win to spare. In fact, so low was Lancia's regard for the Drivers Championship that they did not enter a single car into the season finale RAC Rally, despite the fact that driver Walter Röhrl was still in the running for the title. This may have been, in part, because Röhrl "never dreamed of becoming a world champion."

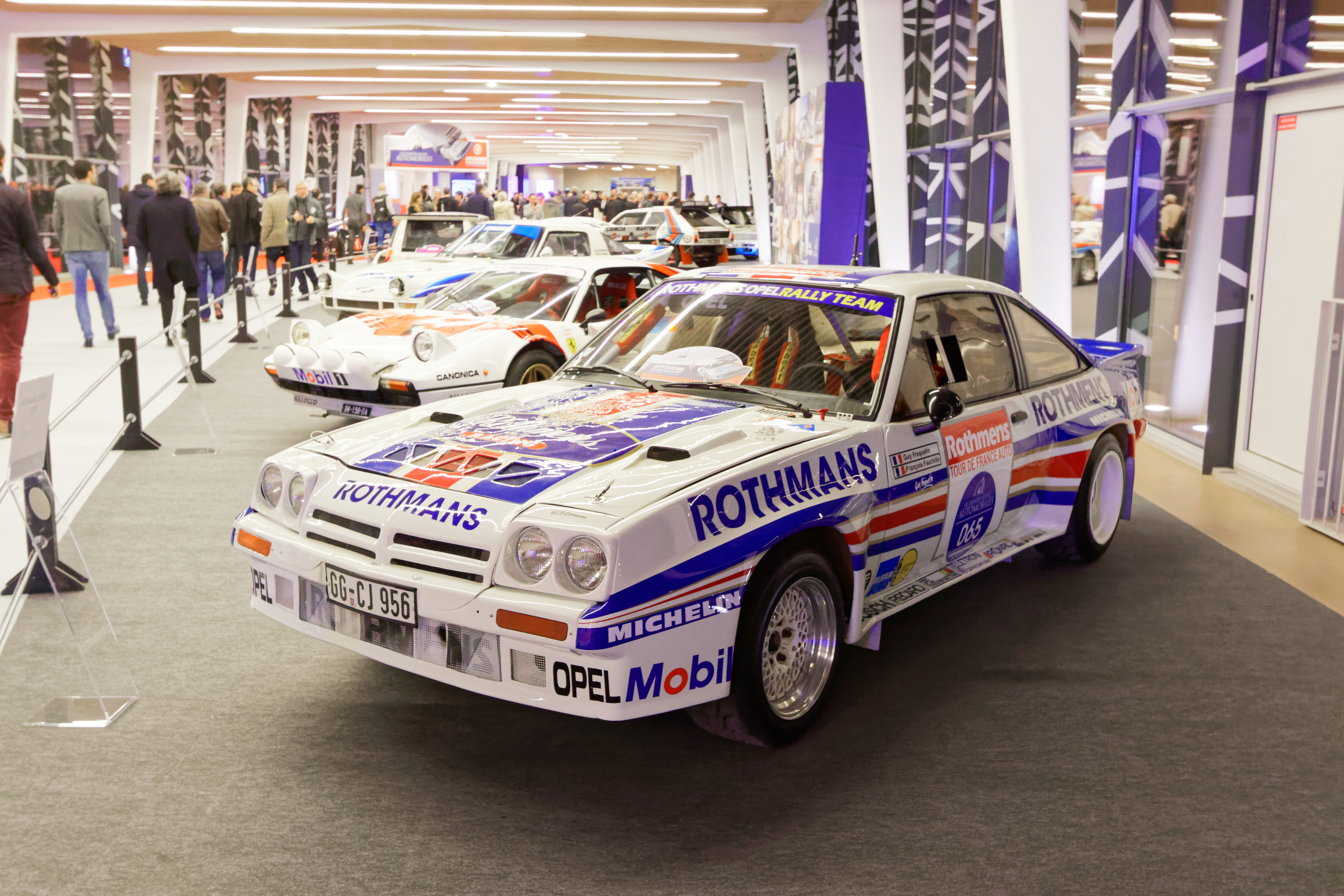
Opel Manta 400

The lenient homologation requirements quickly attracted manufacturers to Group B. Opel replaced their production-derived Ascona with the Group B Manta 400, and Toyota built a new car based on their Celica. Like the Lancia 037, both cars were rear-wheel drive; while proving successful in national rallying in various countries, they were less so at the World Championship level, although Toyota won the 1983 Ivory Coast Rally with Björn Waldegård behind the wheel.

=== 1984–1985 ===
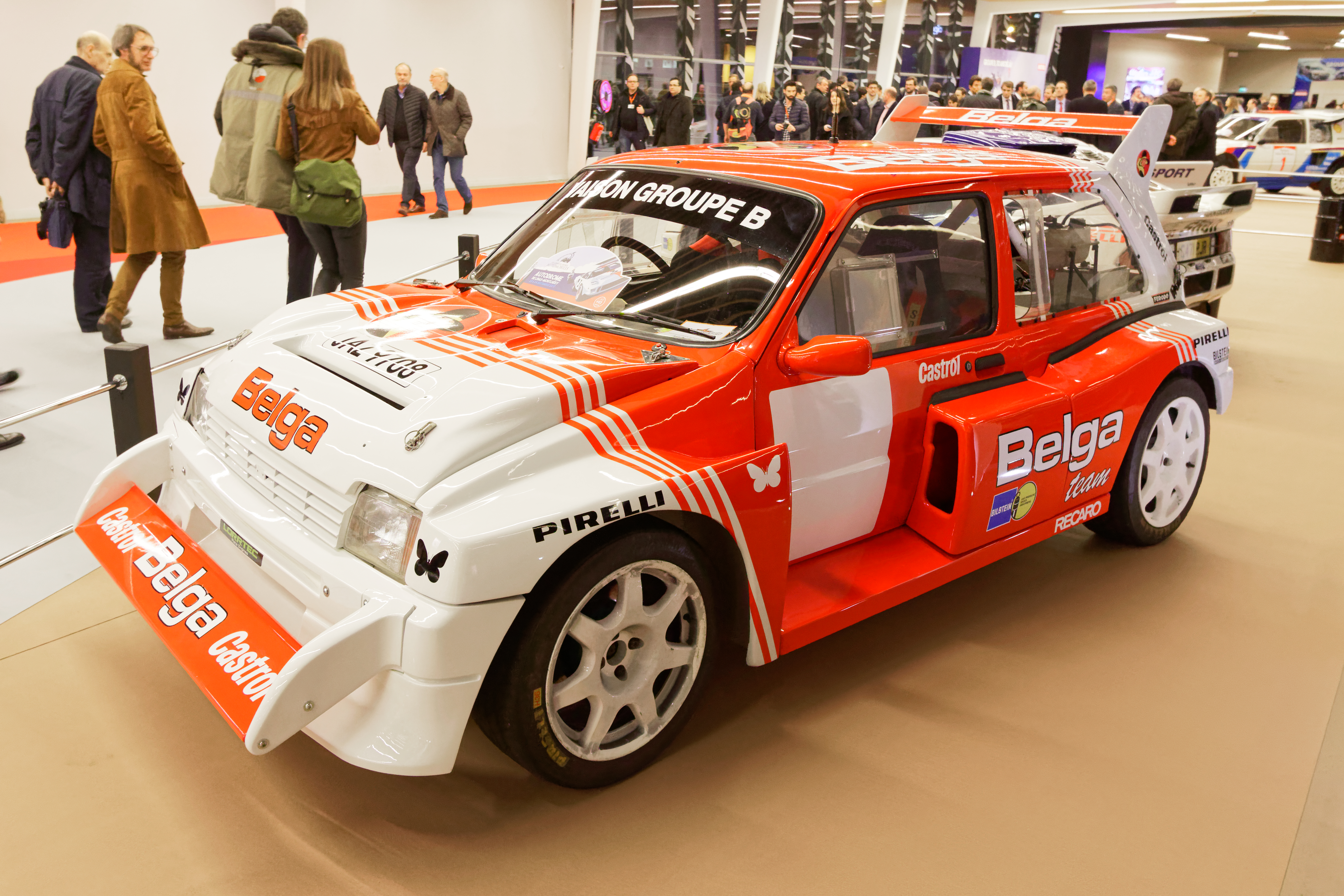
The Metro 6R4 was developed to compete in the 1986 WRC.

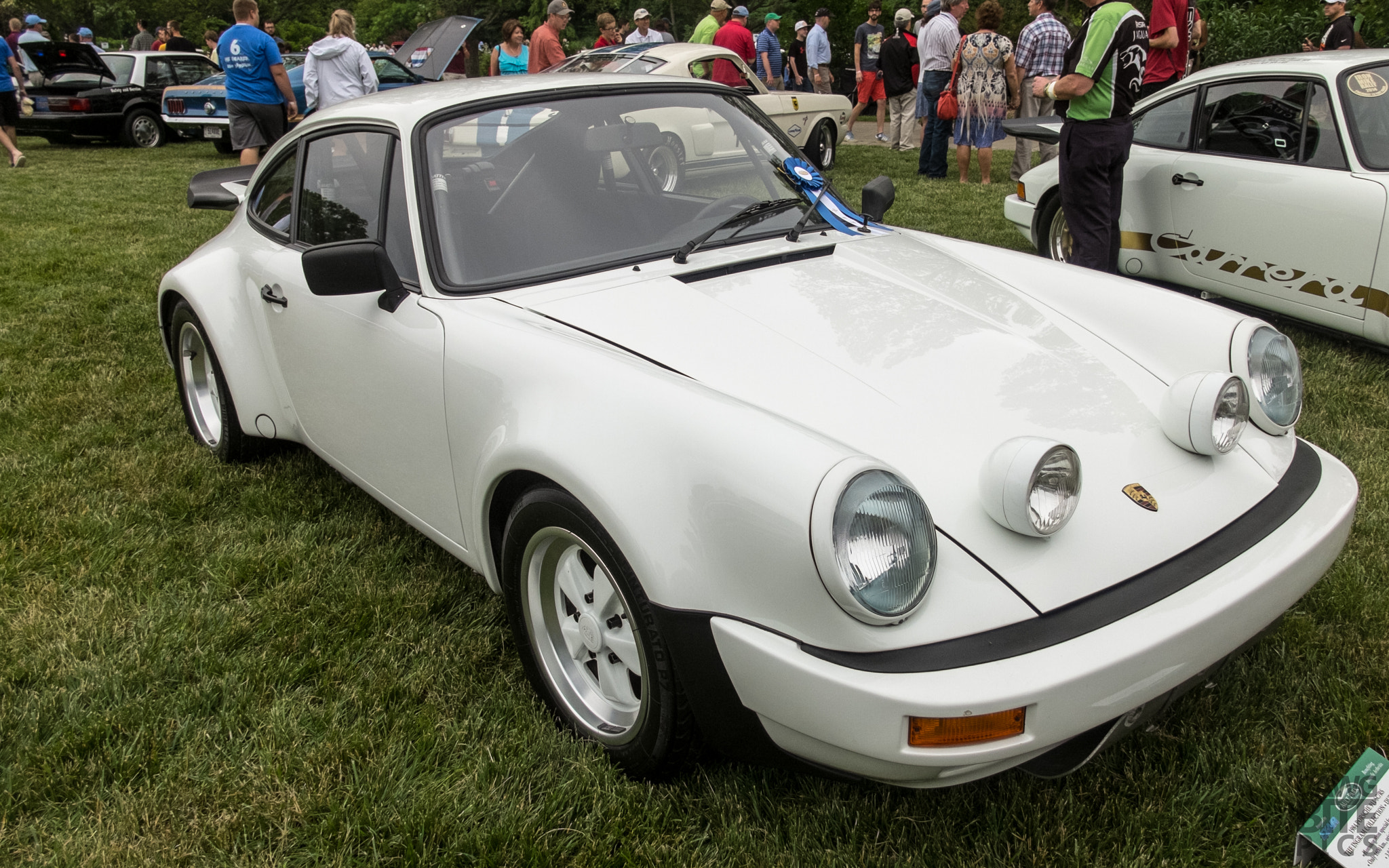
Porsche 911 SC RS homologation special for Group B rallying; developed for the 1984 WRC.

In 1984, Audi beat Lancia for both the manufacturers' title and drivers' titles, the latter of which was won by Stig Blomqvist, but received unexpected new competition midway through the year. Peugeot had joined with its Group B 205 T16. Like the Quattro, the T16 also had four-wheel drive, but was smaller and lighter. At the wheel was 1981 driver's champion Ari Vatanen, with future Ferrari Formula One team manager and FIA President Jean Todt overseeing the operation.

A crash prevented the T16 from winning its first rally, but the writing was on the wall for Audi. Despite massive revisions to the Quattro, including a shorter wheelbase, Peugeot dominated the 1985 season, although not without mishap—Vatanen plunged off the road in Argentina and was seriously injured when his seat mounts broke in the ensuing crash. Fellow Peugeot driver Timo Salonen won the 1985 driver's title with five wins.

Although the crash was a sign that Group B cars had already become dangerously quick (despite Vatanen himself having a consistent record of crashing out while leading), several new Group B cars debuted in 1985:

- Late in the year, Lancia replaced their outclassed 037 with the Delta S4, which featured both a turbocharger and a supercharger for optimum power output.
- Ford returned after several years away with the RS200 and the Sierra RS Cosworth (though the latter went on to compete in Group A).
- Citroën developed and entered the BX 4TC, which had proven too heavy and cumbersome to be successful.
- Rover created the distinctive Metro 6R4, which featured boxy bodywork and a large wing on the front of the car.

=== 1986 ===
For the 1986 season, defending champion Salonen and ex-Toyota driver Juha Kankkunen drove the new Evolution 2 version of Peugeot's 205 T16 with its lightweight spaceframe chassis. Audi's evolved Sport Quattro S1 now boasted over 600 hp (450 kW) and a huge snowplow-like front end. Lancia's Delta S4 would be in the hands of Finnish prodigy Henri Toivonen and Markku Alén, and Ford readied its high-tech RS200 with Stig Blomqvist and Kalle Grundel.

The appeal of the Group B cars had helped attract more spectators to the rally stages. Crowds were so large in places that the road ahead was barely visible to the drivers, with spectators stood on the road itself. Michèle Mouton is quoted as saying she could only drive competitively by thinking of the spectators lining the road as trees. Ari Vatanen spoke of a 'human corridor'. Other reports suggested spectators were interfering with directional markers, or shovelling snow or mud into the road to create a hazard. Some spectators tried to touch passing cars, with enduring rumours that mechanics would find human fingers in the car air intakes or bodywork.

In March, on the first stage of the Rally de Portugal, 'Lagoa Azul', near Sintra, Portuguese driver Joaquim Santos crested a rise, turning to his right to avoid a small group of spectators. This caused him to lose control of his Ford RS200. The car veered to the right and slid off the road into another group of spectators, killing three people and injuring 31 others. All of the top teams immediately pulled out of the rally, with other drivers also refusing to continue. A group of crews including the reigning world champion Timo Salonen stated it was 'impossible to guarantee the safety of the spectators,' and that "The accident on stage one was caused by the driver having to try to avoid spectators that were in the road. It was not due to the type of car or the speed of it."

Ford team manager Peter Ashcroft told reporters he had already expressed concern over crowd control in WRC rallies. Writing in The Guardian, Maurice Hamilton reported that the Portuguese Rally had an appalling safety record, with no-to-poor crowd control, spectators were able to please themselves. On the same stage prior to Santos' accident, Salonen's car had already made contact with a cameraman, breaking bones; and Markku Alén and Henri Toivonen had reportedly had stones thrown at them.

"The worst fear of the rallying world was confirmed yesterday when the absence of crowd control in the Portuguese Rally caused a car to crash, killing three spectators and injuring 31."

— Maurice Hamilton, The Guardian, 6 March 1986

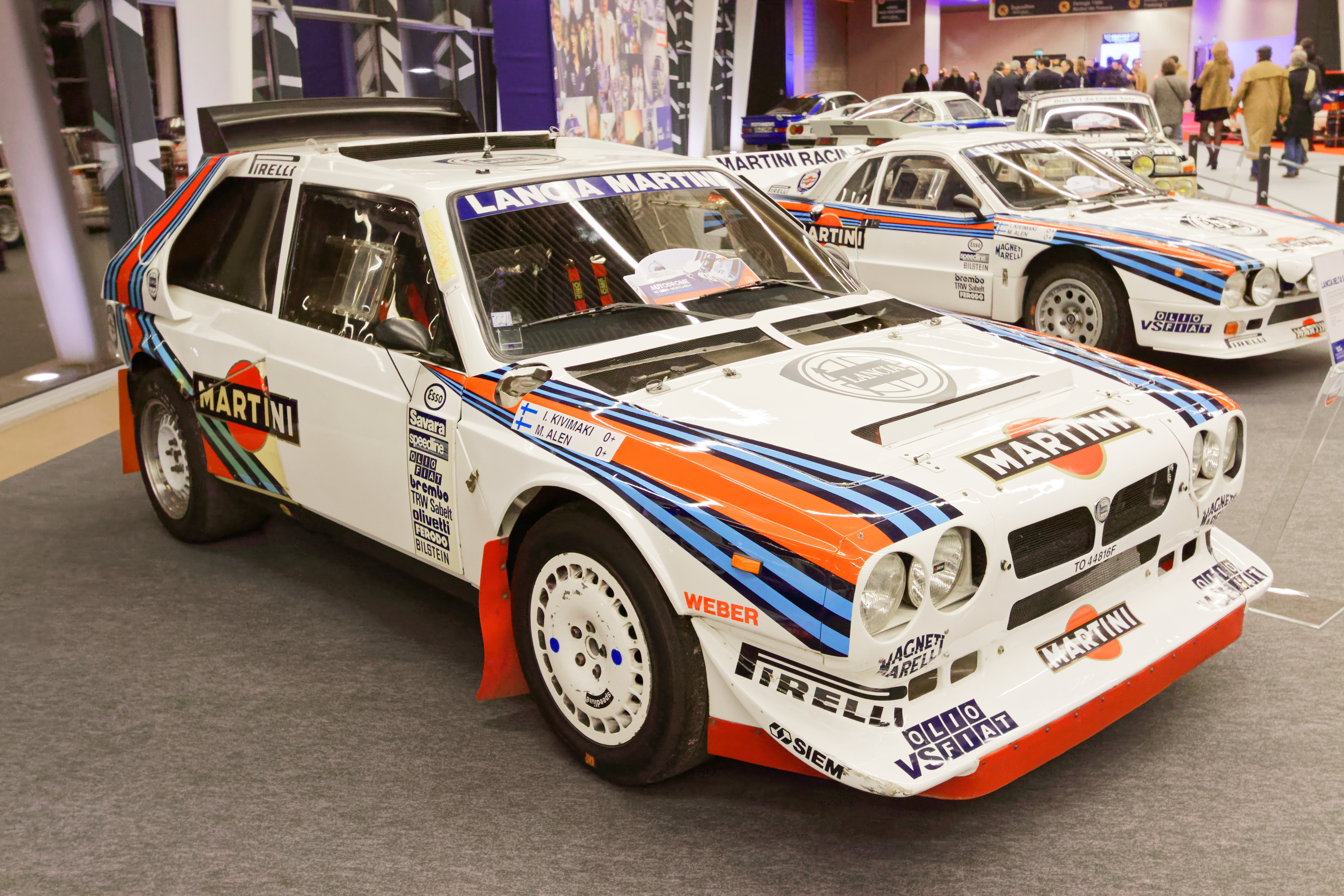
Lancia Delta S4

In May, at the Tour de Corse, Lancia's Toivonen was the championship favourite, and once the rally got underway, he was the pace setter. Seven kilometres into the 18th stage, Toivonen's S4 flew off the unguarded edge of a tightening left-hand bend and plunged down a steep wooded hillside. The car landed upside down with its fuel tanks ruptured by the impact. The combination of a red-hot turbocharger, Kevlar bodywork, and leaking fuel ignited the car and set fire to the dry undergrowth. Toivonen and co-driver Sergio Cresto died in their seats. With no witnesses to the accident, it was impossible to determine what caused the crash. Some cite Toivonen's ill health at the time (he reportedly was suffering from the flu);, or the fatigue of the long rally itinerary without significant rest breaks, others suggest mechanical failure or simply the difficulty of driving the car (although Toivonen, like Vatanen, had a career full of crashing out while leading rallies). Up until that stage he was leading the rally by a large margin, with no other driver in close contention.

The crash came a year after Lancia driver Attilio Bettega had crashed and died in his 037. While that fatality was largely blamed on the unforgiving Corsican scenery (and bad luck, as his co-driver, Maurizio Perissinot, was unharmed), Toivonen and Cresto's deaths, combined with the Portugal tragedy and televised accident of F1 driver Marc Surer in another RS200 which killed co-driver Michel Wyder, compelled the FIA to ban all Group B cars immediately for 1987. Audi decided to quit rallying entirely after the Corsica rally, stating that the FIA decision took no measures into improving spectator safety.

The final days of Group B were also controversial. The Peugeots were disqualified from the Rally Sanremo by the Italian scrutineers as the 'skirts' around the bottom of the car were found to be illegal. Peugeot immediately accused the Italians of favouring Lancia. Their case was strengthened at the next event, the RAC Rally, when the British scrutineers passed the Peugeots as legal in identical trim. FISA annulled the result of the Sanremo Rally eleven days after the final round in the United States. As a result, the championship title was passed from Lancia's Markku Alén to Peugeot's Juha Kankkunen. Salonen had won another two rallies during the 1986 season, becoming the most successful Group B-era driver with a total of seven wins.

=== Beyond WRC ===
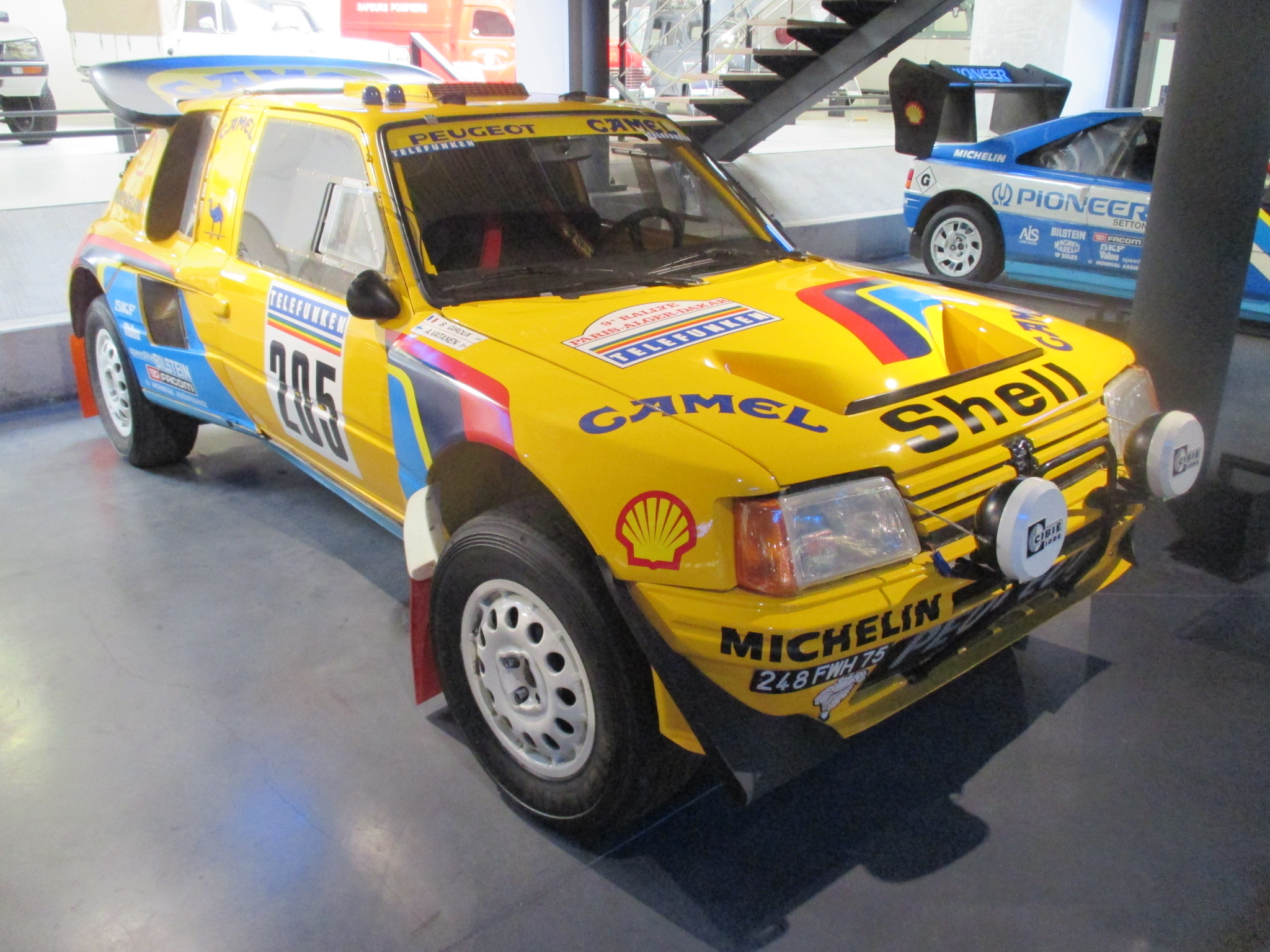
Ari Vatanen's Dakar-spec 205 T16

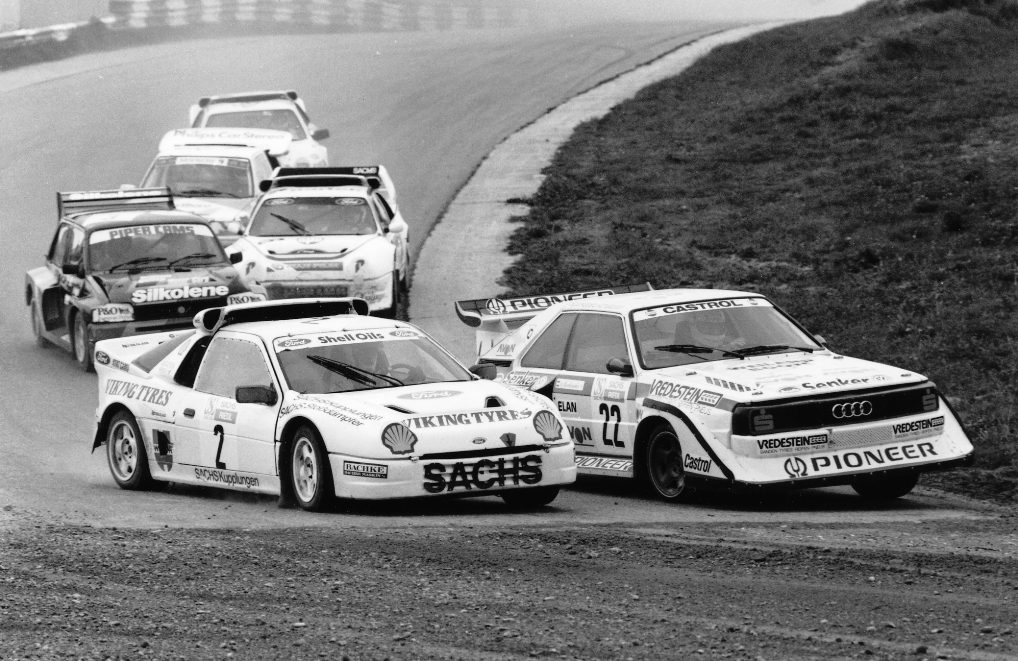
Three Ford RS200 E2, Audi Sport Quattro S1, MG Metro 6R4, and Peugeot 205 T16 E2 in the 1989 Rallycross EC round at Melk

Although 1987 saw the end of Group B rally car development and their appearance on the world rally scene, the cars did not disappear outright. They were still permitted in regional championships, providing they met the limit of 1,600 cc for four-wheel drive or were homologated prior to 1984. Future FIA president Mohammed Ben Sulayem was one privateer who contested rounds of the 1987 Middle East Rally Championship in an Audi Quattro A2 and Opel Manta 400. Independent teams would enter the European Championship too, though the limited options of permitted Group B cars were not as competitive or ubiquitous as newer Group A cars.

Porsche's 959 never entered a WRC event, though it did compete in the Middle East championship and won the Paris-Dakar Rally in 1986. Peugeot adapted their T16 to run in the Dakar Rally. Ari Vatanen won the event in 1987, 1989 and 1990. Improved Peugeot and Audi cars also competed in the Pikes Peak Hillclimb in Colorado. Walter Röhrl's Quattro S1 won the Pikes Peak International Hill Climb in 1987 and set a new record at the time. Audi used their Group B experience to develop a production based racing car for the Trans-Am and IMSA GTO series in 1988 and 1989 respectively.

Many ex-rally cars found homes in European rallycross events from the beginning of 1987 until the end of 1992. The MG Metro 6R4 and Ford RS200 became frequent entries in national championships. For 1993, the FIA replaced the Group B models in the European Rallycross Championship with prototypes that had to be based on existing Group A models.

=== Group S ===
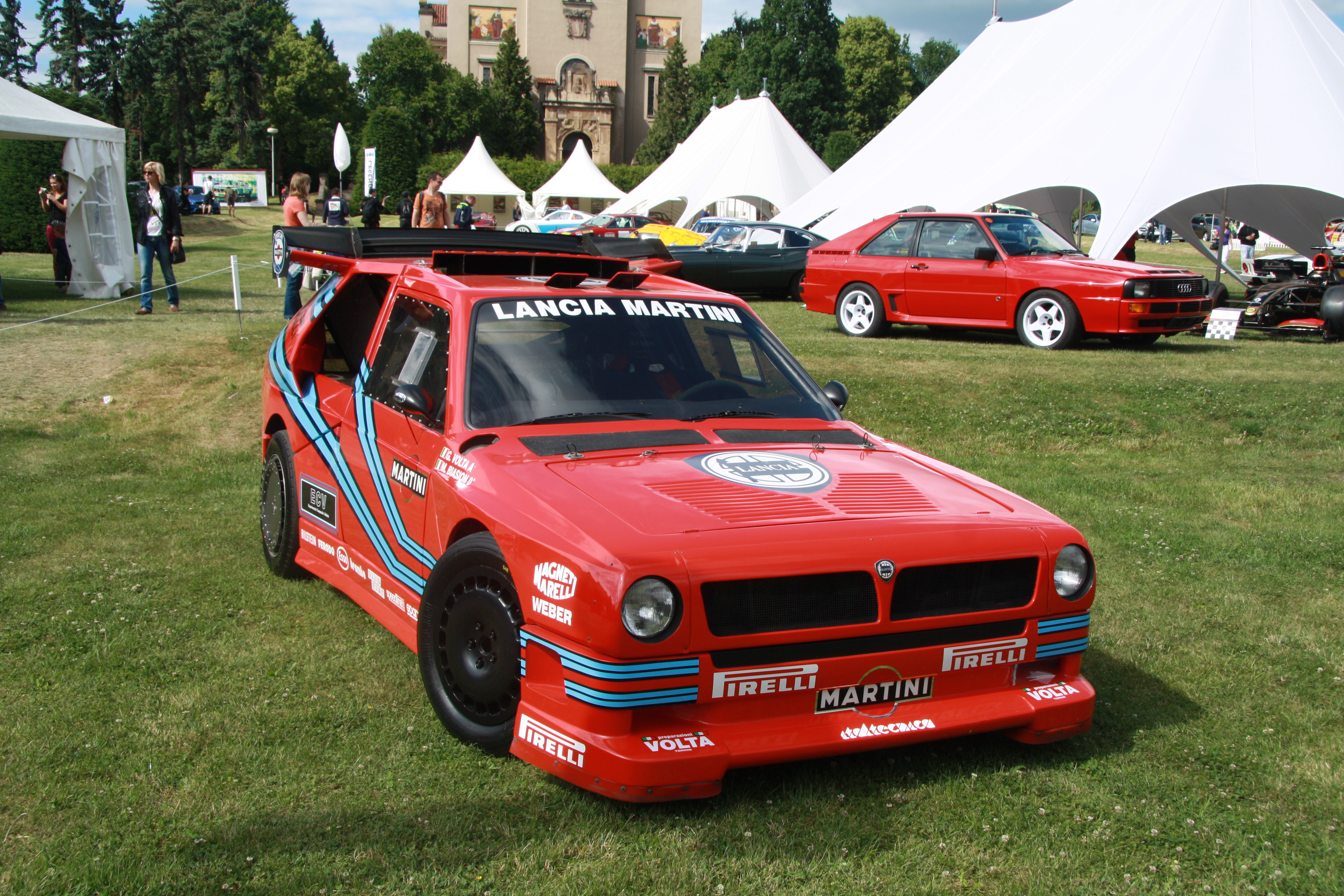
Lancia ECV pictured at Legendy 2014

The cancellation of Group B, coupled with the tragedies of 1986, brought about the scrapping of Group B's proposed replacement: Group S.

Group S rules would have limited car engine power to 300 hp (225 kW). To encourage innovative designs, just ten examples of a car would have been required for homologation, rather than the 200 required for Group B. By the time of its cancellation, at least four Group S prototypes had been built: the Lancia ECV, the Toyota MR2-based 222D, the Opel Kadett Rallye 4x4 (a.k.a. Vauxhall Astra 4S) and the Lada Samara S-proto, and new cars were also planned by both Audi (the 002 Quattro) and Ford (a Group S modification of the RS200). The cancellation of Group S angered many rally insiders who believed the new specification to be both safer than Group B and more exciting than Group A.

The Group S concept was revived by the FIA in 1997 as the World Rally Car specification, which persisted until 2021. WRC cars were limited to 380 hp (283 kW) and required 2,500 examples of a model but, unlike Group S, also had to share certain parts with their base production models.

== Circuit racing ==
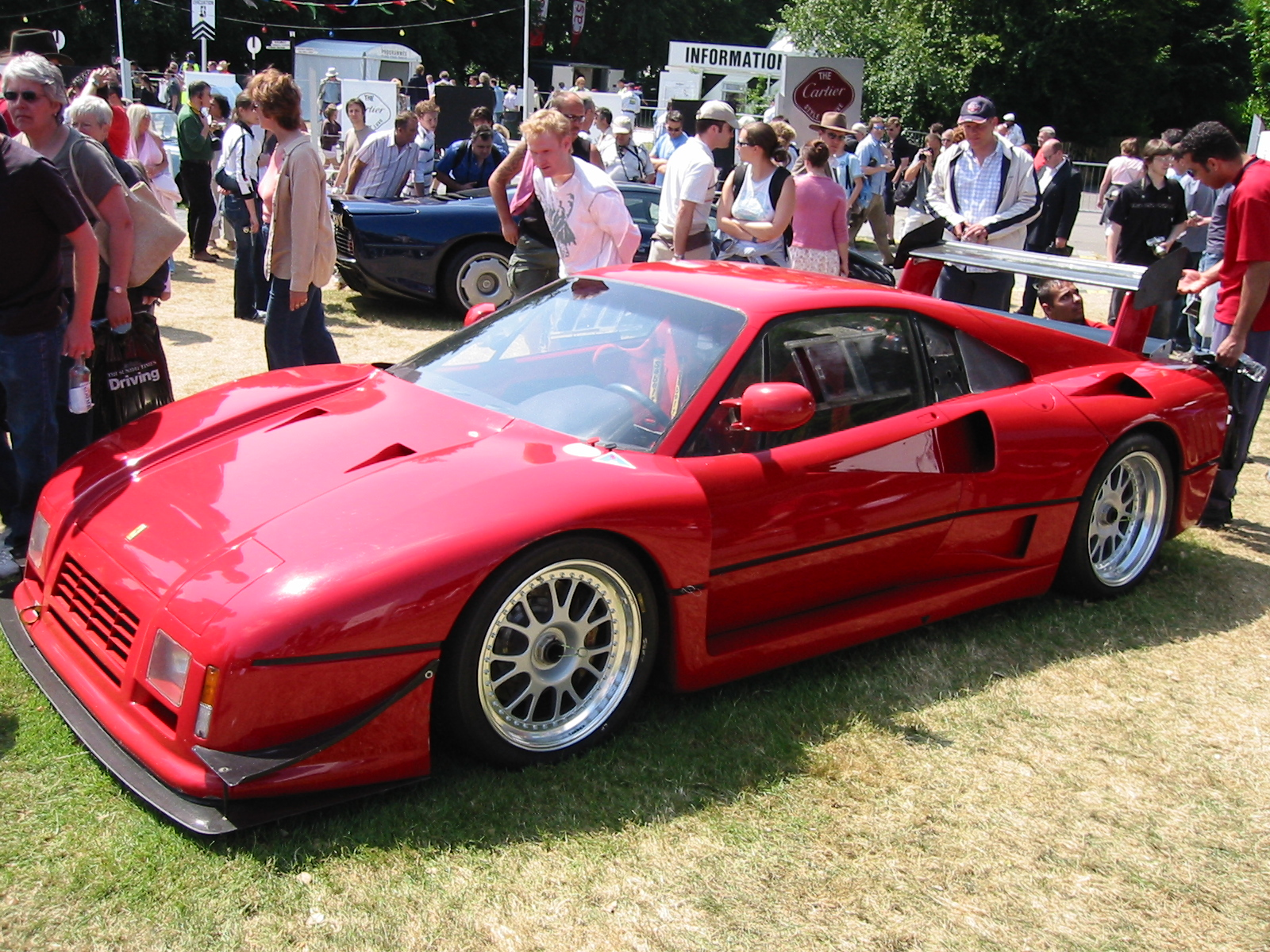
Ferrari 288 GTO Evoluzione (1985)

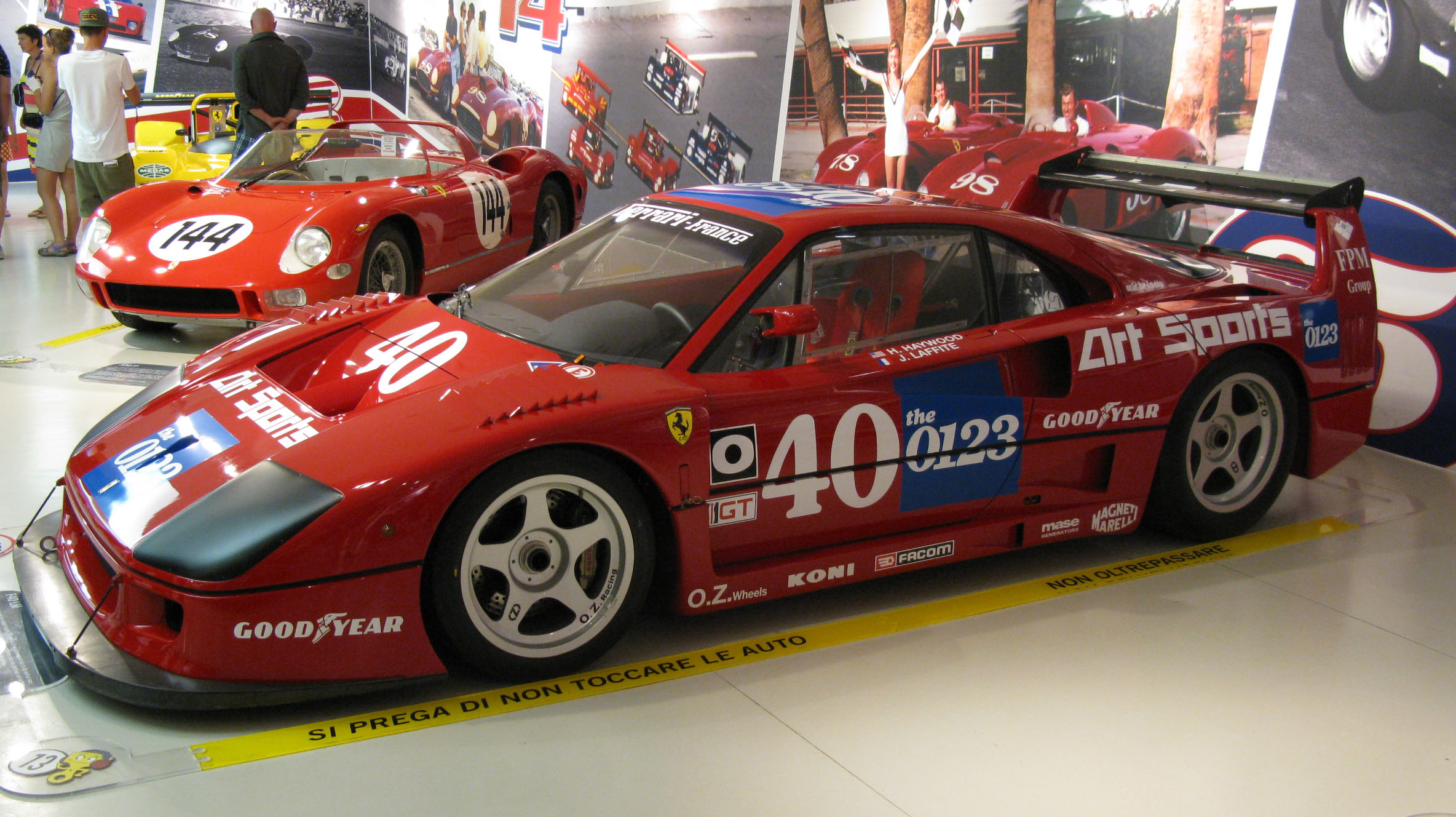
Ferrari F40 LM

From their introduction in 1982, Group B cars found a home in the World Endurance Championship, formerly the World Sportscar Championship, though were secondary to the Group C racing prototypes. The 1983 season had the first significant entry list including Porsche 930, BMW M1 and Ferrari 308 GTB LM vehicles. Porsche won the FIA GT Cup in 1983, handing it over to BMW in 1984 and 1985. From 1986, the championship retired Group B in favor of IMSA-regulated cars, becoming the World Sports Prototype Championship.

The Porsche 961 prototype, intended to be the basis for Group B homologation, won the GTX class at the 24 Hours of Le Mans in 1986 but crashed and caught fire in 1987. The Ferrari 288 GTO had the minimum requirement of cars built and sold to the public, but never saw competition in its category. The WSPC grids it was intended for were filled up by a batch of Group C cars (there would be no production sports car-based racers in European racing, including Le Mans, until 1993), but it saw limited use in an IMSA GTO race in 1989.

== Legacy ==
1985 Audi Sport Quattro S1

The era of Group B is often considered one of the most competitive and compelling periods in rallying. The combination of a lightweight chassis, sophisticated aerodynamics, and massive amounts of horsepower resulted in the development of a class of cars whose performance has not yet been surpassed within their category, even three decades later. In reference to their dubious safety record, the class has also earned an unsavoury nickname among some rally enthusiasts: "Killer B's". In contrast to this, many others refer to the Group B era as the Golden Age of Rallying.

Many racing video games feature Group B cars for the player to drive. One such example is the 2017 video game Gran Turismo Sport, which features a rally car category known as "Gr. B", an obvious homage to Group B. This particular category features predominantly fictional rally cars based on newer models, such as the Mitsubishi Lancer Evolution X and the Subaru WRX STI, although it does include the Pikes Peak version of the Audi Quattro. For the game's sequel, Gran Turismo 7, an actual Group B car—the Peugeot 205 T16—was added to the class. Another video game, Art of Rally, takes place in an alternate universe where Group B was never discontinued, and features fictional cars inspired by the famous rally cars of that era.

== Cars ==
=== Group B ===
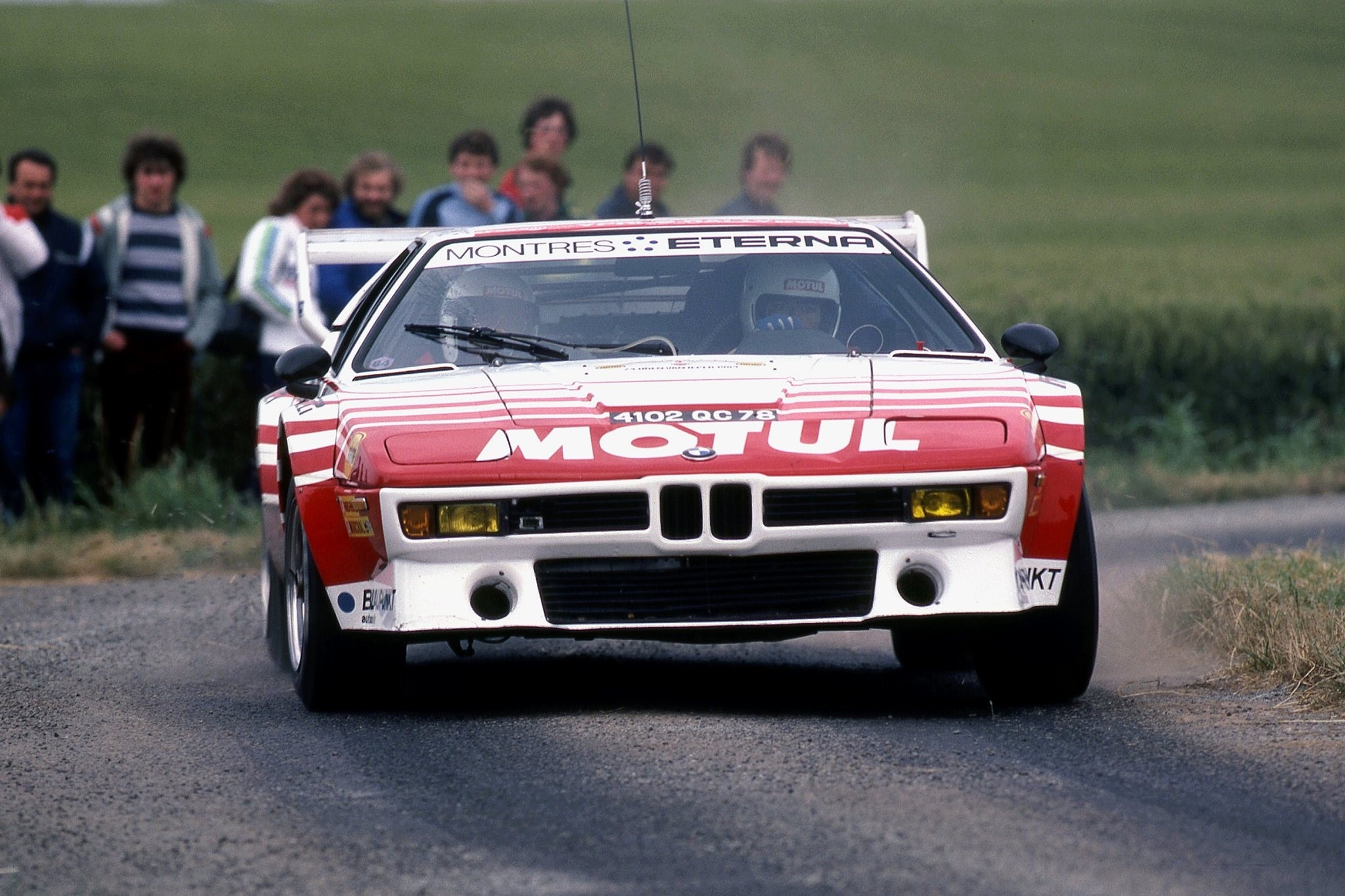
BMW M1

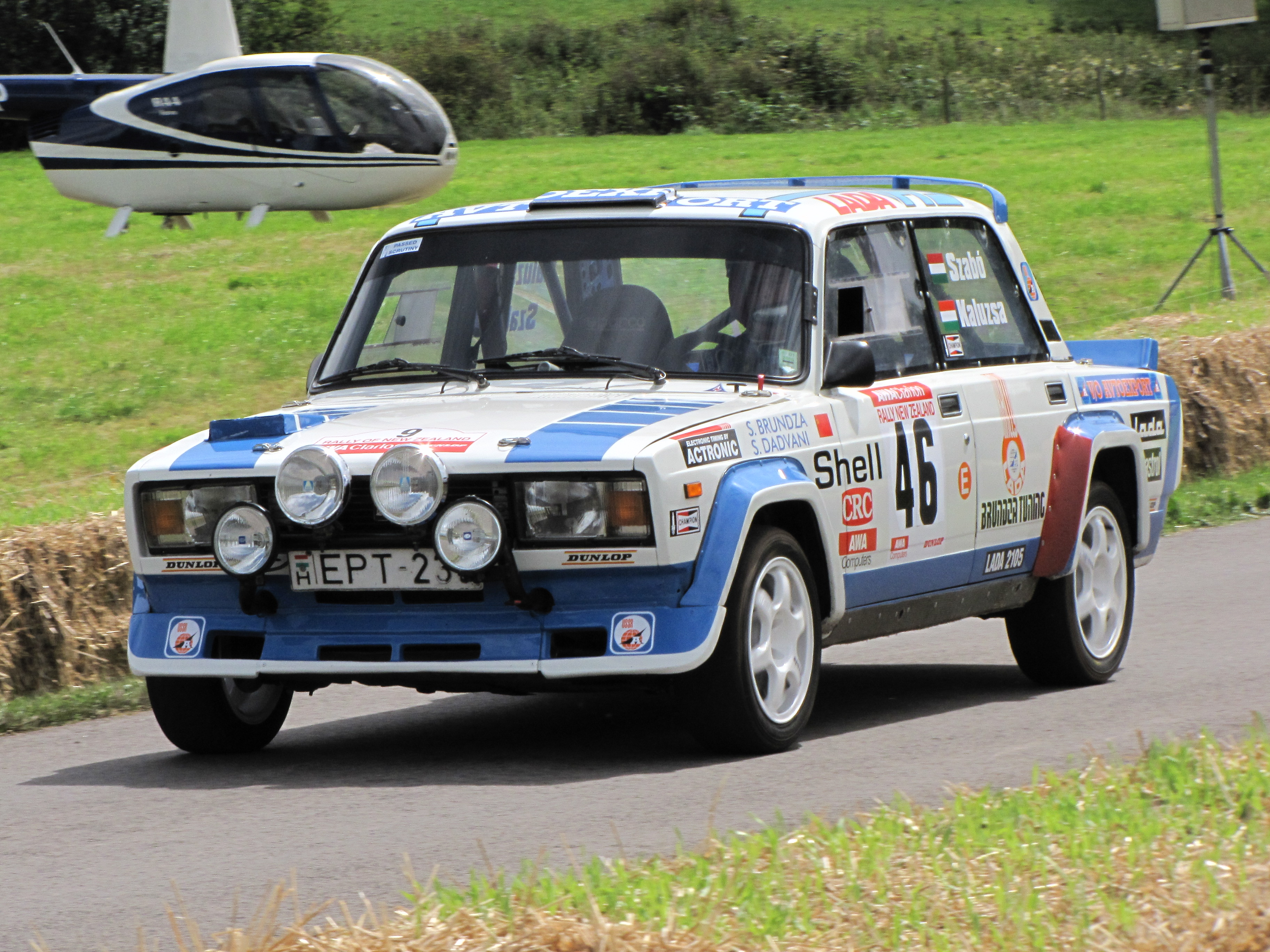
Lada VFTS

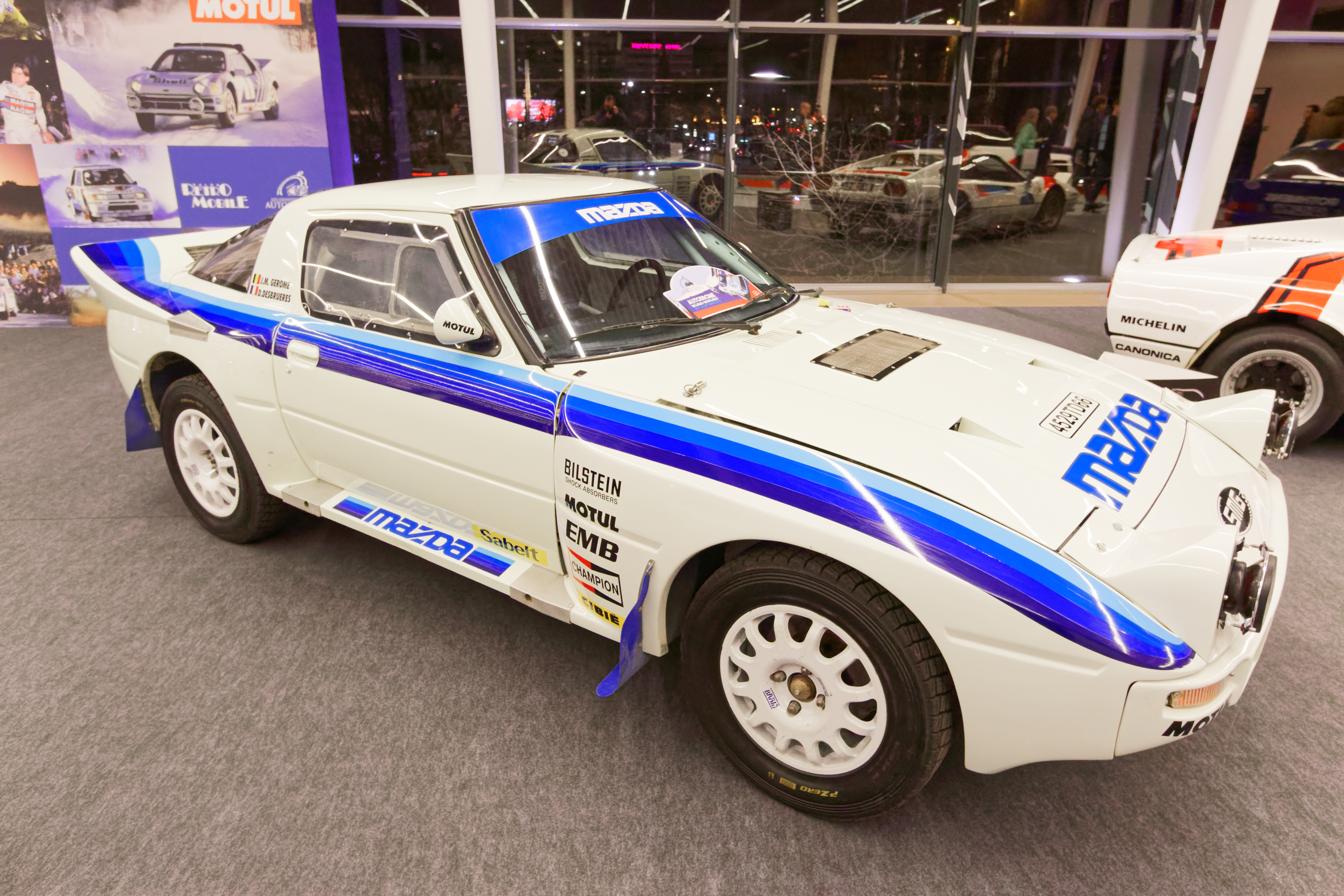
Mazda RX-7

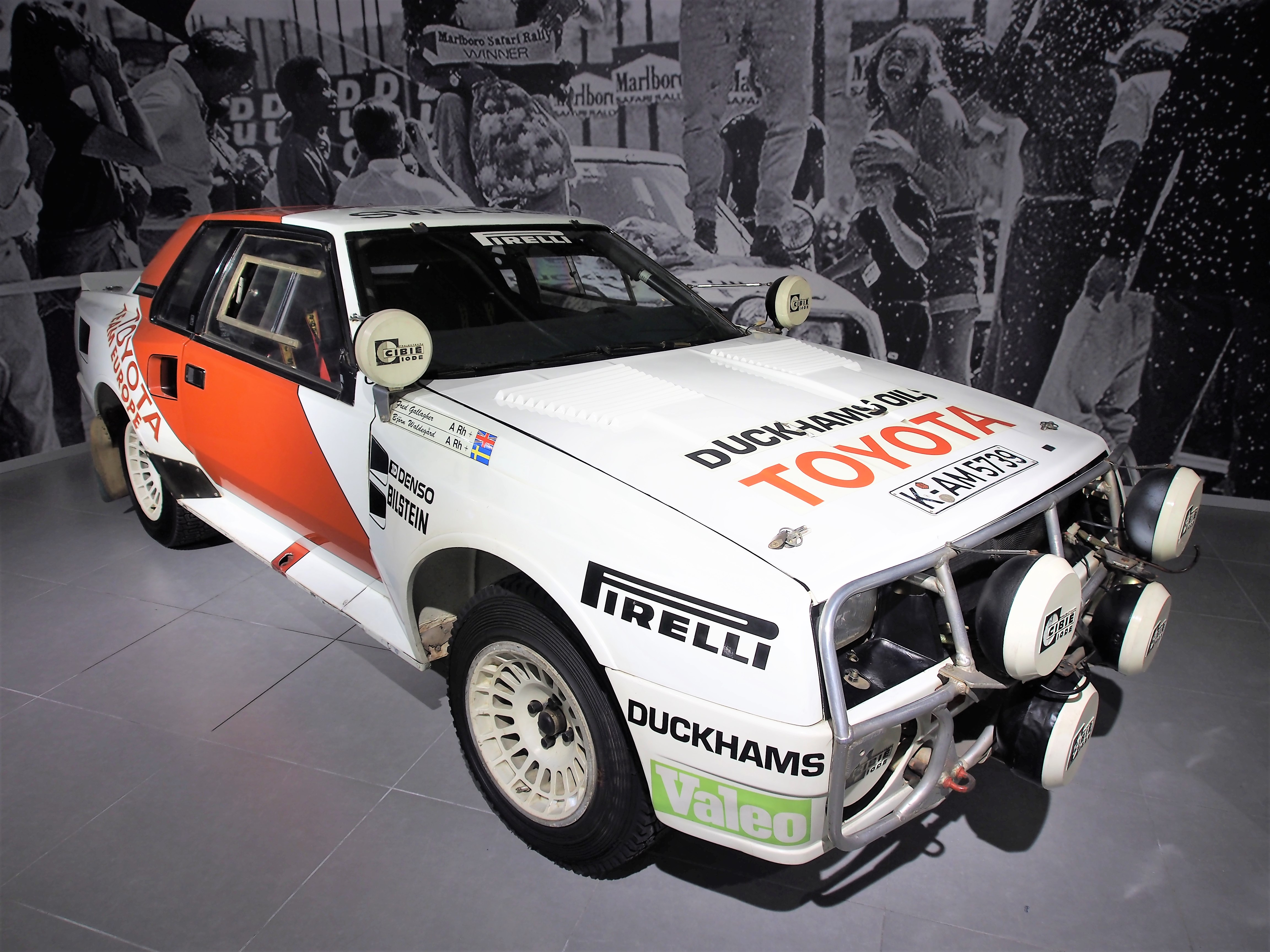
1986 Toyota Celica Twin-Cam Turbo

This list includes under-development and prototype cars that did not receive homologation.

Transferred from Group 4 homologation
Rehomologated for Group A

Car	Class	N°	Start	Note	Source
Alfa Romeo GTV 2000 Turbodelta	B/12	B-238	1 March 1983		
Alfa Romeo Alfasud Sprint 6C		Prototype			
Alfa Romeo SZ	B/12	B-297	1 November 1992		
Alpine A310 V6	B/12	B-204	1 February 1982		
Alpine A610	B/12	B-299	1 April 1993		
Audi Quattro A1	B/12	B-229	1 January 1983		
Audi 80 Quattro A2	B/12	B-231	1 January 1983	(Note: Re-homologated as Group A, homologation number 5156)	
Audi Quattro A1	B/12	B-242	1 May 1983	(Note: 2145cc engine upgrade)	
Audi Quattro A2	B/12	B-243	1 May 1983		
Audi Sport Quattro S1	B/12	B-243	1 May 1984		
Audi Sport Quattro E2	B/12	B-264	1 July 1985		
BMW M1	B/12	B-240	1 March 1983		
Citroën BX 4TC	B/12	B-279	1 October 1986		
Citroën Visa Trophée	B/9	B-201	1 January 1982		
Citroën Visa Chrono II	B/10	B-219	1 October 1982		
Citroën Visa 1000 Pistes	B/10	B-258	1 March 1984		
Daihatsu Charade 926 Turbo	B/9	B-268	1 January 1985		
Daihatsu Charade DeTomaso 926R	Under 1,300cc	Prototype			
Ferrari 308 GTB Michelotto	B/12	B-220	1 October 1982		
Ferrari 308 GTB Michelotto	B/12	B-236	1 January 1983		
Ferrari 308 Quattrovalvole	B/12	B-241	1 April 1983		
Ferrari 288 GTO	B/12	B-273	1 June 1985		
Ferrari 288 GTO Evoluzione		Prototype		(Note: Car built to Group B regulations but not homologated; project abandoned in favor of F40)	
Ferrari F40	B/12	B-293	1 December 1989		
Ford RS200	B/12	B-280	1 February 1986		
Ford Escort RS 1700T		Prototype		(Note: Car built to Group B regulations but not homologated; project abandoned in favor of RS200)	
Ford Escort RS Turbo	B/12	B-270	1 April 1985	(Note: Re-homologated as Group A, homologation number 5272)	
Ford Sierra RS Cosworth	B/12	B-286	1 August 1986	(Note: Re-homologated as Group A, homologation number 5323)	
FSO Polonez 2500 Racing		Prototype	1 April 1985		
FSO Polonez 2000 Rally	B/11	B-261	1 April 1984		
FSO Polonez 2000 Turbo	Under 2,000cc	Prototype			
Giocattolo Group B		Prototype			
Jaguar XJS	B/12	B-292	1 February 1988		
Lada 2105 VFTS	B/10	B-222	1 October 1982		
Lada Samara EVA		Prototype			
Lamborghini Countach 5000QV	B/12	B-291	1 January 1988		
Lancia Rally 037	B/12	B-210	1 April 1982		
Lancia Delta S4	B/12	B-276	1 November 1985		
Mazda RX-7	B/12	B-255	1 February 1984		
Mercedes-Benz 190E Cosworth		Prototype		(Note: Abandoned once the Audi Quattro became known.)	
MG Metro 6R4	B/12	B-277	1 November 1985		
Mitsubishi Lancer 2000 Turbo	B/12	B-230	1 January 1983		
Mitsubishi Starion 4WD		Prototype		(Note: Not homologated in time before Group B ended, ran as prototype)	
Moskvitch-Aleko 2141-KR		Prototype			
Nissan 240RS	B/12	B-233	1 January 1983		
Opel Ascona 400	B/12	B-221	1 November 1982		
Opel Manta 400	B/12	B-237	1 March 1983		
Peugeot 205 T16	B/12	B-262	1 April 1984		
Peugeot 305 V6		Prototype		(Note: Car built to Group B regulations but not homologated; project abandoned in favor of 205 T16)	
Peugeot 504 Turbo Injection	B/12	B-252	1 November 1983		
Peugeot 504 Pickup	B/11	B-228	1 December 1982		
Porsche 924 Carrera GT	B/12	B-203	1 January 1982		
Porsche 911 SC RS	B/12	B-207	1 March 1982		
Porsche 911 Turbo	B/12	B-208	1 January 1982		
Porsche 928S	B/12	B-209	1 January 1982		
Porsche 911 Carrera	B/12	B-282	1 June 1986		
Porsche 911 Carrera 2	B/12	B-294	1 September 1990		
Porsche 911 Carrera 4	B/12	B-295	1 September 1990		
Porsche 911 Carrera RS	B/12	B-296	1 March 1992		
Porsche 911 Turbo	B/12	B-298	1 April 1993		
Porsche 928S	B/12	B-283	1 June 1986		
Porsche 944 Turbo	B/12	B-284	1 June 1986		
Porsche 959		Prototype			
Porsche 961		Prototype			
Premier 118NE	B/9	B-290	1 November 1988		
Renault 5 Turbo "Cévennes"	B/11	B-205	1 February 1982		
Renault 5 Turbo "Tour de Corse"	B/11	B-234	1 January 1983		
Renault 5 Maxi Turbo	B/12	B-267	1 December 1984		
Seat Fura Crono 1.6	B/10	B-244	1 May 1983		
Škoda 130 LR	B/9	B-269	1 January 1985		
Subaru MP-1 Utility	B/11	B-259	1 March 1984		
Subaru XT 4WD Turbo	B/12	B-275	1 October 1985		
Talbot Sunbeam Lotus	B/12	B-227	1 December 1982		
Talbot Horizon		Prototype			
Talbot Samba Rallye	B/9	B-232	1 January 1983		
Toyota Celica Twin-Cam Turbo	B/12	B-239	1 March 1983		

=== Group S ===
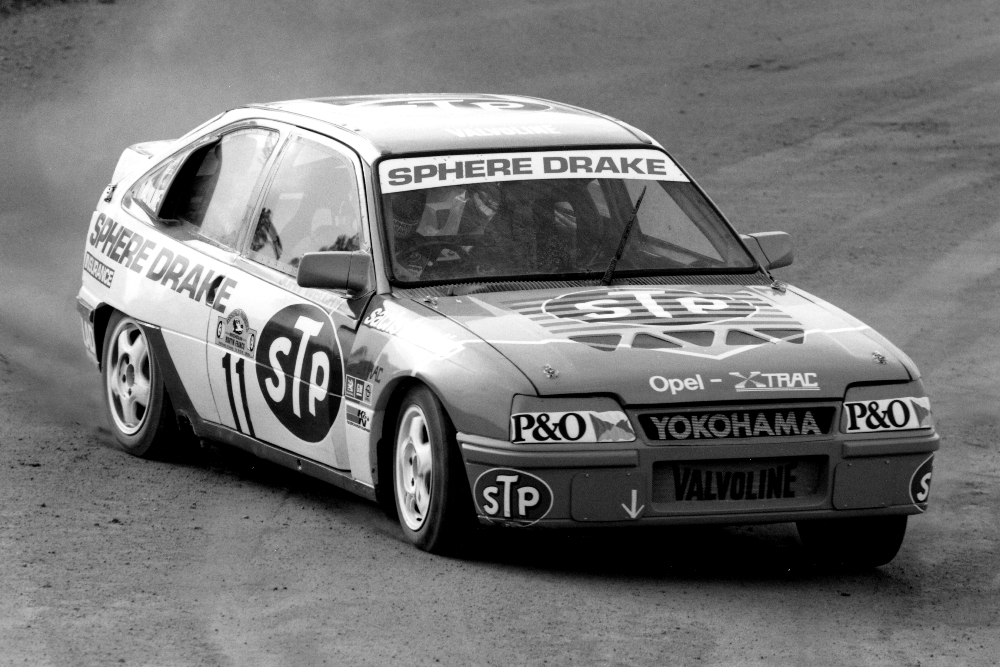
Opel's Kadett Rallye 4x4 was later used by Briton John Welch for Rallycross.

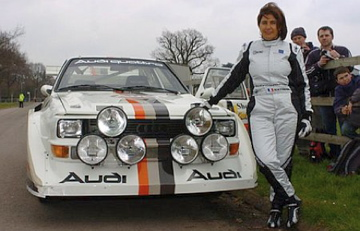
Michèle Mouton and her Quattro in 2007.

- Audi Sport Quattro RS 002
- Ford RS200
- Lada Samara S-proto
- Lancia ECV
- Mazda RX7S
- Opel Kadett Rallye 4x4/Vauxhall Astra 4S
- Peugeot 405 T16 GR
- SEAT Ibiza Bimotor
- Škoda 130LR Evolution
- Toyota 222D (based upon MR2)

== Notable drivers ==
- (Finland) Markku Alén
- (Italy) Attilio Bettega
- (Italy) Miki Biasion
- (Sweden) Stig Blomqvist
- (Poland) Marian Bublewicz
- (United States) John Buffum
- (Finland) Juha Kankkunen
- (Kenya) Shekhar Mehta
- (Finland) Hannu Mikkola
- (France) Michèle Mouton
- (United Kingdom) Tony Pond
- (France) Jean Ragnotti
- (Argentina) Jorge Recalde
- (Germany) Walter Röhrl
- (Finland) Timo Salonen
- (Finland) Henri Toivonen
- (Finland) Ari Vatanen
- (Sweden) Björn Waldegård
