= Lada VFTS =

Rally car based on Lada 2105

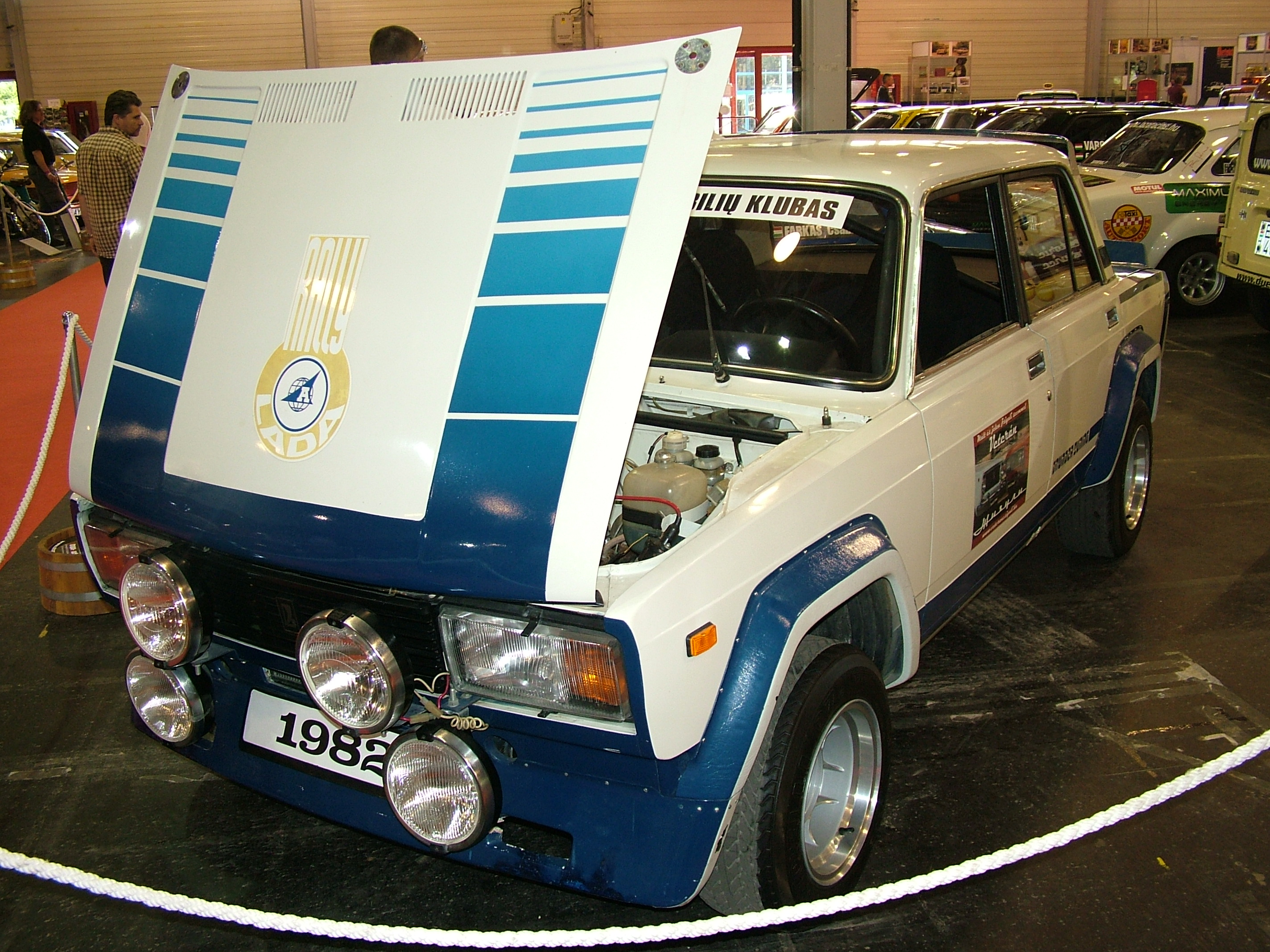

Overview
- Manufacturer: VFTS
- Also called: LADA-2105 VFTS
- Production: 1982–1987
- Assembly: Vilnius, Lithuanian SSR, Soviet Union
- Designer: Stasys Brundza

Body and chassis
- Class: Rally car
- Body style: 2-door sedan
- Layout: Front-engine, rear-wheel-drive
- Related: Lada 2105

Powertrain
- Engine: 1.6 L inline-four petrol
- Transmission: 5-speed manual

Dimensions
- Wheelbase: 2,424 mm (95.4 in)
- Length: 4,130 mm (162.6 in)
- Curb weight: 920–950 kg (2,028–2,094 lb)

Chronology
- Predecessor: Lada-1600 Rally
- Successor: Lada-2108 EVA Turbo

The LADA VFTS is a rally car based on the Lada 2105. Lada is a trademark of the Russian manufacturer AvtoVAZ. VFTS stands for Vilniusskaja Fabrika Transportnych Sredstv (in Cyrillic: Вильнюсская фабрика транспортных средств), Russian for "Vilnius factory of vehicles".

VFTS started as a workshop at the Vilnius car repair factory and later transformed into the Vilnius factory of vehicles, a company that specialized in producing rally/race versions of Lada vehicles and engines. VFTS is best known for a rally version of the Lada 2105, which was prepared under Group B rules. The company was founded and managed by Lithuanian rally driver Stasys Brundza.

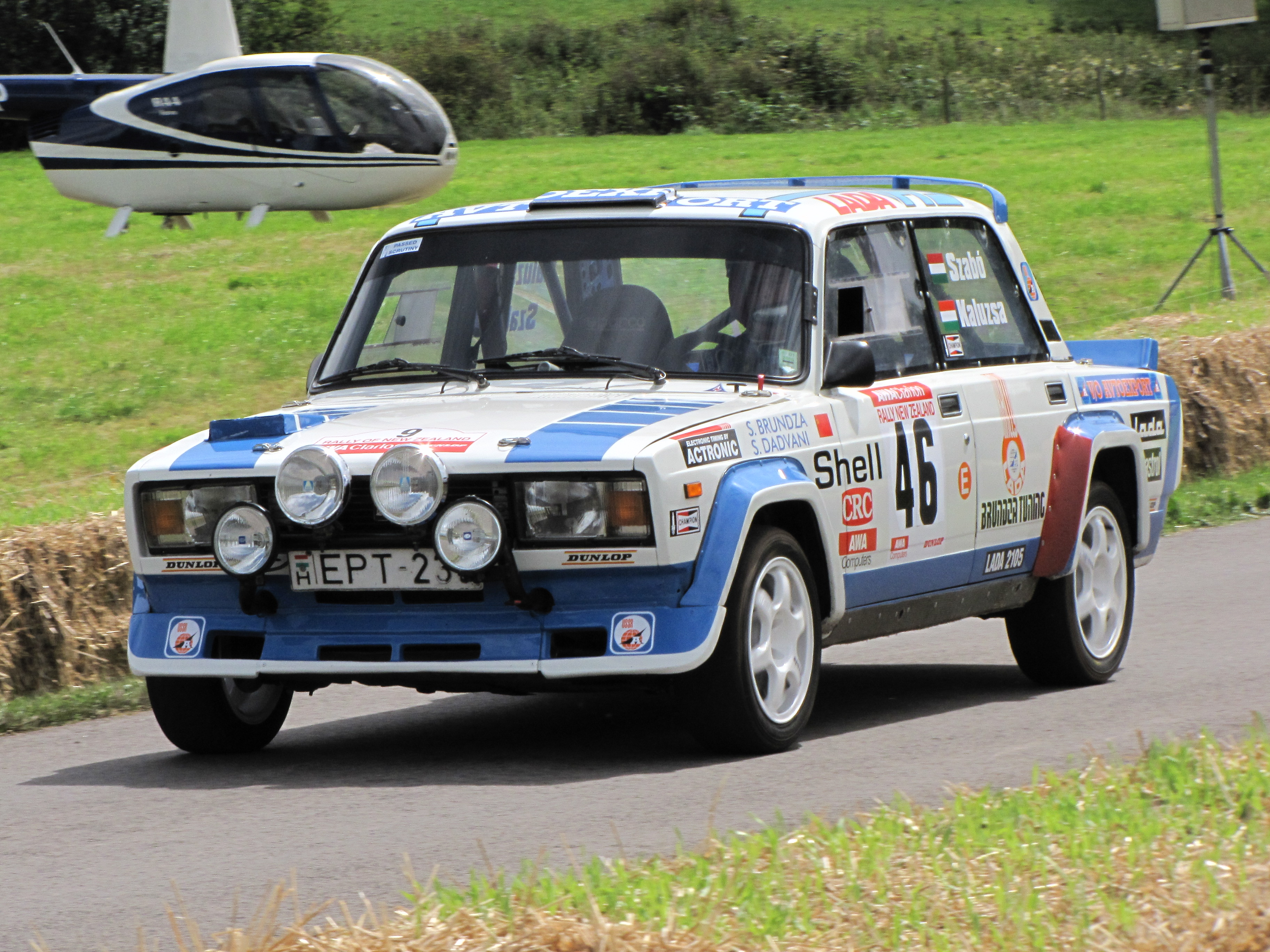
A replica based on the original Lada VFTS

== History ==
The preparation of rally cars started in 1970 in Vilnius, Lithuania (then part of the Soviet Union), in one of the halls of the Vilnius car repair factory. The first model produced in the Vilnius factory was the Lada 1300, with an engine enlarged to 1600cc and tuned to 130-150 HP.

- 1978: "Lada-1600 Rally" model was presented
- 1 October 1982: "LADA VFTS" received FIA homologation
- 1985–1988: VFTS developed the Lada-2108 EVA Turbo, a mid-engine rally car with an 1860 cc, 16 valve, turbocharged engine that produced 270-300 HP under Group B rules. The VFTS soon became very popular among race drivers and rally fans. It was strongly advertised, and a leaflet featuring the car was even translated to English.
- 1988: VFTS became fully independent and renamed "Eksperimentinė sportinių automobilių gamykla" - in English EVA ("Experimental Vilnius Auto-plant").

Number of exported original vehicles:

- 1979: 2 examples to Bulgaria
- 1980: 1 example to Panama, 1 example to Norway
- 1981: 1 example to Norway, 1 example to Canada
- 1984: 2 examples to Cameroon
- 1985: 1 pc. Austria, 1 pc. Norway, 1 pc. Bulgaria
- 1986: 1 pc. Panama, 2 pcs. Jordan, 1 pc. Norway, 2 pcs. Finland, 2 pcs. Spain
- 1987: 1 pc. Finland, 1pc. Panama, 1 pc. Hungary
- 1990: 4 pcs Czechoslovakia "Metalex", 1pc Germany

In total, 30 vehicles were exported.

The head engineers and technicians at VFTS were Zbignevas Kivertas (engine), Henrikas Šilinis, Vygandas Ulickas, and Arūnas Volungevičius (design of Lada 2108 EVA).

However, production of the Lada VFTS did not continue long after Group B was banned. As the Soviet Union abolished the production of these cars, various rally drivers started to copy the design and technical solutions of the VFTS. LADA-VFTS became very popular in Hungary. Lada VFTS cars reappeared in the H class of the Hungarian championship at the end of the 1990s. Nowadays, this car is very popular among rally drivers in ex-Soviet and other European countries. For example, Russian rally drivers use these cars in Club Rally Series, also in short Rally-Sprints series. They build replicas of VFTS cars and are showing results that are better than with other newer rally cars.

== Appearance ==
The car's mudguards are angularly broadened which gives the car's characteristic appearance. This modification was not merely about design it was necessary because of the car's widened wheels. Spoilers are also used.

== Construction ==
The most important factor during the creation of a Lada VFTS was to reduce total weight. To achieve weight of 920–950 kg different materials are used such as plexi glass or polycarbonate instead of glass. As this car was designed for races there were many changes comparing to the Lada 2105 that gives its brakes and bodywork to the complete racecar. Many parts of the VFTS are strengthened in order to improve driving stability, cornering, grip and handling.

Lada VFTS is a rear-wheel drive car. However, during its development many things were changed. The brake system remained the same that was used on production vehicles from the Soviet factory. Disk brakes are used on the front axle while drum brakes are used on the rear.

The engine is different from the original one. There's a high-efficiency engine in it that has higher petrol consumption. 100 octane fuel is used in these race cars. Many things are transferred or removed from the engine compartment to make it easier to repair and to get rid of the unnecessary elements such as the air filter. The structural and electronical changes in Lada VFTS cars result in 160-180 HP compared to only 75 HP in the standard model 2105. The body is also strengthened in order to make the car suitable for race adversities. The axle housing was heavily fortified. A single-row gearshift that is different from the usual one is used in this car that produces the characteristic sound of these cars. Due to the modifications there were also changes in the places of each gear as a result of lack of space. The cabin is also converted. Roll over cage is added. There are only two bucket seats with 4-point seat belts. The dashboard is also reorganized to make the contingent repairs easier and faster.
