= 2025 Acropolis Rally =

69th edition of the Acropolis Rally

2025 Acropolis Rally EKO Acropolis Rally 2025
Round 7 of 14 in the 2025 World Rally Championship
← Previous event	Next event →
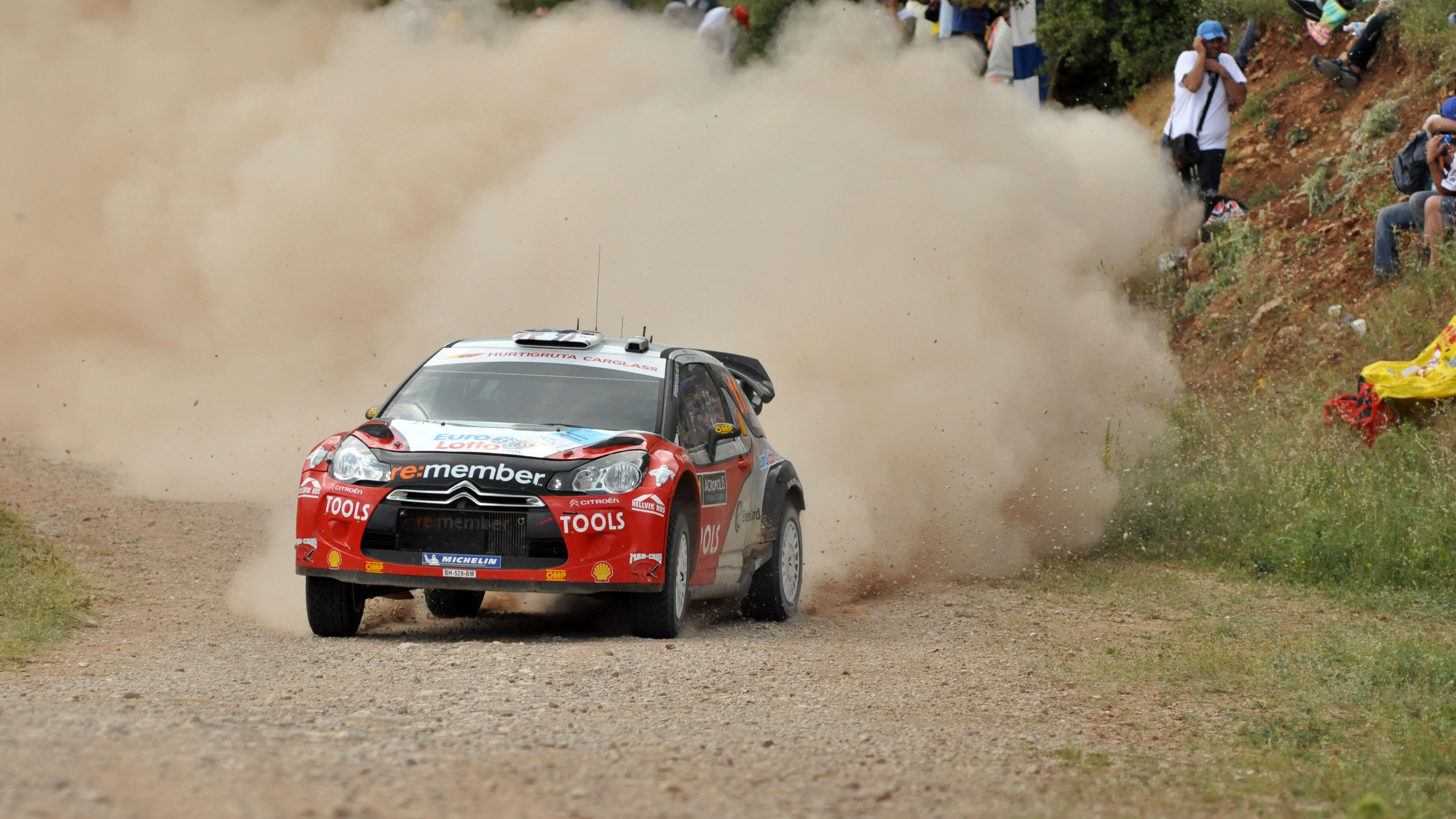
- Twisty gravel mountain roads, high temperatures and choking dust are the challenges of the event.
- Host country: Greece
- Rally base: Lamia, Central Greece
- Dates run: 26 – 29 June 2025
- Start location: Athens, Attica
- Finish location: Lamia, Central Greece
- Stages: 17 (345.76 km; 214.85 miles)
- Stage surface: Gravel
- Transport distance: 1,076.54 km (668.93 miles)
- Overall distance: 1,422.30 km (883.78 miles)

Statistics
- Crews registered: 69
- Crews: 67 at start, 49 at finish

Overall results
- Overall winner: (Estonia) Ott Tänak (Estonia) Martin Järveoja (South Korea) Hyundai Shell Mobis WRT; 4:12:20.1
- Sunday Accumulated leader: (France) Sébastien Ogier (France) Vincent Landais (Japan) Toyota Gazoo Racing WRT; 1:15:37.6
- Power Stage winner: (France) Sébastien Ogier (France) Vincent Landais (Japan) Toyota Gazoo Racing WRT; 16:34.6

Support category results
- WRC-2 winner: (Sweden) Oliver Solberg (United Kingdom) Elliott Edmondson (Finland) Printsport; 4:22:54.8
- WRC-3 winner: (Turkey) Ali Türkkan (Turkey) Oytun Albayrak (Turkey) Castrol Ford Team Türkiye; 4:39:31.7
- J-WRC winner: (Turkey) Ali Türkkan (Turkey) Oytun Albayrak (Turkey) Castrol Ford Team Türkiye; 4:39:31.7

The 2025 Acropolis Rally (also known as the EKO Acropolis Rally 2025) was a motor racing event for rally cars scheduled to be held over four days from 26 to 29 June 2025. It marked the sixty-ninth running of the Acropolis Rally, and was the seventh round of the 2025 World Rally Championship, 2025 WRC2 Championship and 2025 WRC3 Championship. The event was also be third round of the 2025 Junior WRC Championship. The 2025 event was based in Lamia in Central Greece and was contested over seventeen special stages, covering a total competitive distance of 345.76 km (214.85 mi).

Thierry Neuville and Martijn Wydaeghe were the defending rally winners, and their team, Hyundai Shell Mobis WRT, were the defending manufacturer's winners. Sami Pajari and Enni Mälkönen were the defending rally winners in the WRC2 category, but they did not defend their titles as they were promoted to the top tier by Toyota. Norbert Maior and Francesca Maria Maior were the defending rally winners in the WRC3 category, as well as the junior category.

Ott Tänak and Martin Järveoja won the rally, and their team, Hyundai, successfully defended their titles. Oliver Solberg and Elliott Edmondson were the winners in the WRC2 category. Ali Türkkan and Oytun Albayrak were the winners in the WRC3 category as well as the junior championship.

== Background ==
=== Entry list ===
The following crews entered into the rally. The event was opened to crews competing in the World Rally Championship, its support categories, the WRC2 Championship, the WRC3 Championship and privateer entries that were not registered to score points in any championship. Twelve entered under Rally1 regulations, as were thirty-four Rally2 crews in the WRC2 Championship and eleven Rally3 crew in the WRC3 Championship. A total of nine crews participated in the Junior World Rally Championship.

Rally1 entries competing in the World Rally Championship
No.	Driver	Co-Driver	Entrant	Car	Championship eligibility	Tyre
1	(Belgium) Thierry Neuville	(Belgium) Martijn Wydaeghe	(South Korea) Hyundai Shell Mobis WRT	Hyundai i20 N Rally1	Driver, Co-driver, Manufacturer	H
5	(Finland) Sami Pajari	(Finland) Marko Salminen	(Japan) Toyota Gazoo Racing WRT2	Toyota GR Yaris Rally1	Driver, Co-driver, Manufacturer, Team	H
8	(Estonia) Ott Tänak	(Estonia) Martin Järveoja	(South Korea) Hyundai Shell Mobis WRT	Hyundai i20 N Rally1	Driver, Co-driver, Manufacturer	H
9	(Greece) Jourdan Serderidis	(Belgium) Frédéric Miclotte	(United Kingdom) M-Sport Ford WRT	Ford Puma Rally1	Driver, Co-driver	H
13	(Luxembourg) Grégoire Munster	(Belgium) Louis Louka	(United Kingdom) M-Sport Ford WRT	Ford Puma Rally1	Driver, Co-driver, Manufacturer	H
16	(France) Adrien Fourmaux	(France) Alexandre Coria	(South Korea) Hyundai Shell Mobis WRT	Hyundai i20 N Rally1	Driver, Co-driver, Manufacturer	H
17	(France) Sébastien Ogier	(France) Vincent Landais	(Japan) Toyota Gazoo Racing WRT	Toyota GR Yaris Rally1	Driver, Co-driver, Manufacturer	H
18	(Japan) Takamoto Katsuta	(Republic of Ireland) Aaron Johnston	(Japan) Toyota Gazoo Racing WRT	Toyota GR Yaris Rally1	Driver, Co-driver	H
22	(Latvia) Mārtiņš Sesks	(Latvia) Renārs Francis	(United Kingdom) M-Sport Ford WRT	Ford Puma Rally1	Driver, Co-driver	H
33	(United Kingdom) Elfyn Evans	(United Kingdom) Scott Martin	(Japan) Toyota Gazoo Racing WRT	Toyota GR Yaris Rally1	Driver, Co-driver, Manufacturer	H
55	(Republic of Ireland) Josh McErlean	(Republic of Ireland) Eoin Treacy	(United Kingdom) M-Sport Ford WRT	Ford Puma Rally1	Driver, Co-driver, Manufacturer	H
69	(Finland) Kalle Rovanperä	(Finland) Jonne Halttunen	(Japan) Toyota Gazoo Racing WRT	Toyota GR Yaris Rally1	Driver, Co-driver, Manufacturer	H

Rally2 entries competing in the WRC2 Championship
No.	Driver	Co-Driver	Entrant	Car	Championship eligibility	Tyre
20	(France) Yohan Rossel	(France) Arnaud Dunand	(France) PH Sport	Citroën C3 Rally2	Driver, Co-driver, Team	H
21	(Sweden) Oliver Solberg	(United Kingdom) Elliott Edmondson	(Finland) Printsport	Toyota GR Yaris Rally2	Driver, Co-driver	H
23	(United Kingdom) Gus Greensmith	(Sweden) Jonas Andersson	(United Kingdom) Gus Greensmith	Škoda Fabia RS Rally2	Driver, Co-driver	H
24	(Spain) Jan Solans	(Spain) Rodrigo Sanjuan de Eusebio	(Spain) PH.Ph	Toyota GR Yaris Rally2	Challenger Driver, Challenger Co-driver	H
25	(Italy) Roberto Daprà	(Italy) Luca Guglielmetti	(Italy) Roberto Daprà	Škoda Fabia RS Rally2	Challenger Driver, Challenger Co-driver	H
26	(Paraguay) Fabrizio Zaldivar	(Italy) Marcelo Der Ohannesian	(Paraguay) Fabrizio Zaldivar	Škoda Fabia RS Rally2	Challenger Driver, Challenger Co-driver	H
27	(Finland) Mikko Heikkilä	(Finland) Kristian Temonen	(Finland) Mikko Heikkilä	Škoda Fabia RS Rally2	Challenger Driver, Challenger Co-driver	H
28	(Spain) Alejandro Cachón	(Spain) Borja Rozada	(Spain) Toyota España	Toyota GR Yaris Rally2	Challenger Driver, Challenger Co-driver	H
30	(France) Léo Rossel	(France) Guillaume Mercoiret	(France) PH Sport	Citroën C3 Rally2	Challenger Driver, Challenger Co-driver, Team	H
31	(Finland) Lauri Joona	(Finland) Samu Vaaleri	(Finland) Lauri Joona	Škoda Fabia RS Rally2	Challenger Driver, Challenger Co-driver	H
32	(Spain) Diego Ruiloba	(Spain) Ángel Vela	(Spain) Diego Ruiloba	Citroën C3 Rally2	Challenger Driver, Challenger Co-driver	H
34	(Poland) Kajetan Kajetanowicz	(Poland) Maciej Szczepaniak	(Poland) Kajetan Kajetanowicz	Toyota GR Yaris Rally2	Challenger Driver, Challenger Co-driver	H
35	(Finland) Emil Lindholm	(Finland) Reeta Hämäläinen	(Germany) Toksport WRT	Škoda Fabia RS Rally2	Driver, Co-driver, Team	H
36	(France) Pablo Sarrazin	(France) Geoffrey Combe	(Italy) Sarrazin Motorsport – Iron Lynx	Citroën C3 Rally2	Challenger Driver, Challenger Co-driver	H
37	(France) Pierre-Louis Loubet	(France) Loris Pascaud	(United Kingdom) M-Sport Ford WRT	Ford Fiesta Rally2	Driver, Co-driver	H
38	(Bolivia) Marco Bulacia	(Spain) Diego Vallejo	(Bolivia) Marco Bulacia	Toyota GR Yaris Rally2	Challenger Driver, Challenger Co-driver	H
39	(Japan) Yuki Yamamoto	(Republic of Ireland) James Fulton	(Japan) Toyota Gazoo Racing WRT NG	Toyota GR Yaris Rally2	Challenger Driver, Challenger Co-driver, Team	H
40	(France) Sarah Rumeau	(France) Julie Amblard	(Italy) Sarrazin Motorsport – Iron Lynx	Citroën C3 Rally2	Challenger Driver, Challenger Co-driver, Team	H
41	(Mexico) Alejandro Mauro	(Spain) Adrián Pérez	(Mexico) Alejandro Mauro	Škoda Fabia RS Rally2	Challenger Driver, Challenger Co-driver	H
42	(Estonia) Robert Virves	(Estonia) Jakko Viilo	(Germany) Toksport WRT	Škoda Fabia RS Rally2	Challenger Driver, Challenger Co-driver, Team	H
43	(Czech Republic) Martin Prokop	(Czech Republic) Michal Ernst	(Czech Republic) Martin Prokop	Škoda Fabia RS Rally2	Challenger Driver, Challenger Co-driver	H
44	(Estonia) Georg Linnamäe	(United Kingdom) James Morgan	(Estonia) Georg Linnamäe	Toyota GR Yaris Rally2	Challenger Driver, Challenger Co-driver	H
45	(Bolivia) Bruno Bulacia	(Brazil) Gabriel Morales	(Bolivia) Bruno Bulacia	Toyota GR Yaris Rally2	Challenger Driver, Challenger Co-driver	H
46	(Japan) Hikaru Kogure	(Finland) Topi Matias Luhtinen	(Japan) Toyota Gazoo Racing WRT NG	Toyota GR Yaris Rally2	Challenger Driver, Challenger Co-driver, Team	H
47	(Germany) Fabio Schwarz	(Austria) Bernhard Ettel	(Germany) Armin Schwarz Driving Experience	Toyota GR Yaris Rally2	Challenger Driver, Challenger Co-driver	H
48	(Italy) Giovanni Trentin	(Italy) Alessandro Franco	(Italy) MT Racing SRL	Škoda Fabia RS Rally2	Challenger Driver, Challenger Co-driver	H
49	(Greece) Giorgos Amoutzas	(Greece) Elias Panagiotounis	(Greece) Giorgos Amoutzas	Škoda Fabia Rally2 evo	Challenger Driver, Challenger Co-driver	H
50	(Greece) Epaminondas Karanikolas	(Greece) Giorgos Kakavas	(Greece) Epaminondas Karanikolas	Ford Fiesta Rally2	Challenger Driver, Challenger Co-driver	H
51	(Qatar) Abdulaziz Al-Kuwari	(Republic of Ireland) Lorcan Moore	(Qatar) Abdulaziz Al-Kuwari	Citroën C3 Rally2	Challenger Driver, Challenger Co-driver	H
52	(Mexico) Miguel Granados	(Spain) Marc Martí	(Mexico) Miguel Granados	Škoda Fabia RS Rally2	Challenger/Masters Driver, Challenger/Masters Co-driver	H
53	(Netherlands) Bernhard ten Brinke	(United Kingdom) Tom Woodburn	(Netherlands) Bernhard ten Brinke	Škoda Fabia RS Rally2	Challenger Driver, Challenger Co-driver	H
54	(Turkey) Uğur Soylu	(Turkey) Sener Güray	(Turkey) GP Garage My Team	Škoda Fabia RS Rally2	Challenger/Masters Driver, Challenger Co-driver	H
56	(Romania) Eugen Cărăgui	(Romania) Robert Patrick Fus	(Romania) Eugen Cărăgui	Citroën C3 Rally2	Challenger Driver, Challenger Co-driver	H
57	(Romania) Cristian Dolofan	(Romania) Traian Pavel	(Romania) Cristian Dolofan	Citroën C3 Rally2	Challenger Driver, Challenger Co-driver	H

Rally3 entries competing in the WRC3 Championship and/or the Junior World Rally Championship
No.	Driver	Co-Driver	Entrant	Car	Class/Championship eligibility	Tyre
58	(Greece) Efthimios Halkias	(Greece) Nikos Komnos	(Greece) Efthimios Halkias	Renault Clio Rally3	WRC3	H
59	(Greece) Giorgos Delaportas	(Greece) Evangelos Panaritis	(Greece) Giorgos Delaportas	Ford Fiesta Rally3	WRC3	H
60	(Greece) Stephanos Theocharopoulos	(Greece) Giorgos Kotsalis	(Greece) Stephanos Theocharopoulos	Ford Fiesta Rally3	WRC3	H
61	(Greece) Georgios Vasilakis	(United Kingdom) Allan Harryman	(Greece) Georgios Vasilakis	Ford Fiesta Rally3	WRC3, Masters Driver, Masters Co-Driver	H
62	(Greece) Giorgos Dodos	(Greece) Nikos Intzoglou	(Greece) Giorgos Dodos	Renault Clio Rally3	WRC3	H
63	(Australia) Taylor Gill	(Australia) Daniel Brkic	FIA Rally Star	Ford Fiesta Rally3	WRC3, Junior WRC	H
64	(Sweden) Mille Johansson	(Sweden) Johan Grönvall	(Sweden) Mille Johansson	Ford Fiesta Rally3	Junior WRC	H
65	(Turkey) Kerem Kazaz	(France) Corentin Silvestre	(Turkey) Team Petrol Ofisi	Ford Fiesta Rally3	WRC3, Junior WRC	H
66	(Republic of Ireland) Eamonn Kelly	(Republic of Ireland) Conor Mohan	(Republic of Ireland) Motorsport Ireland Rally Academy	Ford Fiesta Rally3	Junior WRC	H
67	(Belgium) Thomas Martens	(United Kingdom) Max Freeman	(Belgium) Thomas Martens	Ford Fiesta Rally3	Junior WRC	H
68	(Turkey) Ali Türkkan	(Turkey) Oytun Albayrak	(Turkey) Castrol Ford Team Türkiye	Ford Fiesta Rally3	WRC3, Junior WRC	H
70	(South Africa) Max Smart	(New Zealand) Malcolm Read	FIA Rally Star	Ford Fiesta Rally3	WRC3, Junior WRC	H
71	(Paraguay) Diego Dominguez Jr.	(Spain) Rogelio Peñate	(Paraguay) Diego Dominguez Jr.	Ford Fiesta Rally3	WRC3, Junior WRC	H
72	(Germany) Claire Schönborn	(Germany) Michael Wenzel	WRC Young Driver Program	Ford Fiesta Rally3	WRC3, Junior WRC	H

Other major entries
No.	Driver	Co-Driver	Entrant	Car	Tyre
29	(Bulgaria) Nikolay Gryazin	(Kyrgyzstan) Konstantin Aleksandrov	(Bulgaria) Nikolay Gryazin	Škoda Fabia RS Rally2	H

=== Itinerary ===
All dates and times are EEST (UTC+3).

Date	No.	Time span	Stage name	Distance
26 June	—	After 8:01	Lamia [Shakedown]	3.62 km
26 June		After 17:45	Opening ceremony, Athens	—N/a
26 June	SS1	After 18:05	EKO Athens SSS	1.50 km
27 June	SS2	After 7:28	Aghii Theodori 1	26.76 km
27 June	SS3	After 8:31	Loutraki	12.90 km
27 June		9:03 – 9:48	Regroup	—N/a
27 June	SS4	After 10:28	Aghii Theodori 2	26.76 km
27 June		11:16 – 11:46	Regroup	—N/a
27 June		11:46 – 12:06	Remote service, Loutraki	—N/a
27 June	SS5	After 14:29	Thiva	19.58 km
27 June	SS6	After 16:50	Stiri	24.18 km
27 June		17:48 – 18:08	Regroup	—N/a
27 June	SS7	After 19:31	Elatia	11.58 km
27 June		20:53 – 21:38	Flexi service A, Lamia	—N/a
28 June	SS8	After 8:22	Pavliani 1	24.58 km
28 June	SS9	After 10:05	Karoutes 1	19.48 km
28 June	SS10	After 11:32	Inohori 1	17.66 km
28 June		12:52 – 13:32	Regroup	—N/a
28 June		13:32 – 14:12	Service B, Lamia	—N/a
28 June	SS11	After 15:22	Pavliani 2	24.58 km
28 June	SS12	After 17:05	Karoutes 2	19.48 km
28 June	SS13	After 18:32	Inohori 2	17.66 km
28 June		20:02 – 20:47	Flexi service C, Lamia	—N/a
29 June	SS14	After 8:03	Smokovo 1	26.16 km
29 June	SS15	After 9:05	Tarzan 1	23.37 km
29 June		10:39 – 11:09	Regroup	—N/a
29 June		11:09 – 11:24	Service D, Lamia	—N/a
29 June	SS16	After 12:32	Smokovo 2	26.16 km
29 June		13:22 – 14:02	Regroup	—N/a
29 June	SS17	After 14:15	Tarzan 2 [Power Stage]	23.37 km
29 June		After 15:49	Finish	—N/a
29 June		After 16:45	Podium ceremony, Lamia	—N/a

== Report ==
=== WRC Rally1 ===
==== Classification ====
Position		No.	Driver	Co-driver	Entrant	Car	Time	Difference	Points			
Event	Class	No.	Driver	Co-driver	Entrant	Car	Time	Difference	Event	Sunday	Stage	Total
1	1	8	Ott Tänak	Martin Järveoja	Hyundai Shell Mobis WRT	Hyundai i20 N Rally1	4:12:20.1	0.0	25	4	1	30
2	2	17	Sébastien Ogier	Vincent Landais	Toyota Gazoo Racing WRT	Toyota GR Yaris Rally1	4:12:52.9	+32.8	17	5	5	27
3	3	16	Adrien Fourmaux	Alexandre Coria	Hyundai Shell Mobis WRT	Hyundai i20 N Rally1	4:15:29.9	+3:09.8	15	2	0	17
4	4	33	Elfyn Evans	Scott Martin	Toyota Gazoo Racing WRT	Toyota GR Yaris Rally1	4:15:51.2	+3:31.1	12	3	2	17
5	5	1	Thierry Neuville	Martijn Wydaeghe	Hyundai Shell Mobis WRT	Hyundai i20 N Rally1	4:21:19.6	+8:59.5	10	0	3	13
12	6	55	Josh McErlean	Eoin Treacy	M-Sport Ford WRT	Ford Puma Rally1	4:29:06.2	+16:46.1	0	0	0	0
15	7	22	Mārtiņš Sesks	Renārs Francis	M-Sport Ford WRT	Ford Puma Rally1	4:31:20.1	+19:00.0	0	0	0	0
26	8	69	Kalle Rovanperä	Jonne Halttunen	Toyota Gazoo Racing WRT	Toyota GR Yaris Rally1	4:51:29.0	+39:08.9	0	0	4	4
30	9	18	Takamoto Katsuta	Aaron Johnston	Toyota Gazoo Racing WRT	Toyota GR Yaris Rally1	4:56:29.2	+44:09.1	0	0	0	0
46	10	5	Sami Pajari	Marko Salminen	Toyota Gazoo Racing WRT2	Toyota GR Yaris Rally1	5:34:41.1	+1:22:21.0	0	1	0	1
Retired SS14		13	Grégoire Munster	Louis Louka	M-Sport Ford WRT	Ford Puma Rally1	Mechanical		0	0	0	0
Retired SS10		9	Jourdan Serderidis	Frédéric Miclotte	M-Sport Ford WRT	Ford Puma Rally1	Medical reasons		0	0	0	0

==== Special stages ====
Stage	Winners	Car	Time	Class leaders
SD	Neuville / Wydaeghe	Hyundai i20 N Rally1	2:37.9	—N/a
SS1	Ogier / Landais	Toyota GR Yaris Rally1	1:18.1	Ogier / Landais
SS1	Tänak / Järveoja	Hyundai i20 N Rally1	1:18.1	Ogier / Landais
SS2	Ogier / Landais	Toyota GR Yaris Rally1	19:00.1	Ogier / Landais
SS3	Fourmaux / Coria	Hyundai i20 N Rally1	9:08.7	Neuville / Wydaeghe
SS4	Ogier / Landais	Toyota GR Yaris Rally1	18:31.5	Ogier / Landais
SS5	Fourmaux / Coria	Hyundai i20 N Rally1	13:24.4	Ogier / Landais
SS6	Fourmaux / Coria	Hyundai i20 N Rally1	15:03.9	Tänak / Järveoja
SS7	Neuville / Wydaeghe	Hyundai i20 N Rally1	8:15.3	Tänak / Järveoja
SS8	Tänak / Järveoja	Hyundai i20 N Rally1	19:34.1	Tänak / Järveoja
SS9	Tänak / Järveoja	Hyundai i20 N Rally1	12:14.6	Tänak / Järveoja
SS10	Ogier / Landais	Toyota GR Yaris Rally1	14:16.4	Tänak / Järveoja
SS11	Tänak / Järveoja	Hyundai i20 N Rally1	19:16.9	Tänak / Järveoja
SS12	Tänak / Järveoja	Hyundai i20 N Rally1	12:02.2	Tänak / Järveoja
SS13	Tänak / Järveoja	Hyundai i20 N Rally1	14:00.0	Tänak / Järveoja
SS14	Tänak / Järveoja	Hyundai i20 N Rally1	21:05.2	Tänak / Järveoja
SS15	Tänak / Järveoja	Hyundai i20 N Rally1	16:52.7	Tänak / Järveoja
SS16	Ogier / Landais	Toyota GR Yaris Rally1	20:58.8	Tänak / Järveoja
SS17	Ogier / Landais	Toyota GR Yaris Rally1	16:34.6	Tänak / Järveoja

==== Championship standings ====
Drivers' Standings
Move	Pos.	Driver	Points
	1	Elfyn Evans	150
	2	Sébastien Ogier	141
1	3	Ott Tänak	138
1	4	Kalle Rovanperä	117
	5	Thierry Neuville	96

Co-drivers' Standings
Move	Pos.	Driver	Points
	1	Scott Martin	150
	2	Vincent Landais	141
1	3	Martin Järveoja	138
1	4	Jonne Halttunen	117
	5	Martijn Wydaeghe	96

Manufacturers' Standings
Move	Pos.	Driver	Points
	1	Toyota Gazoo Racing WRT	358
	2	Hyundai Shell Mobis WRT	293
	3	M-Sport Ford WRT	97
	4	Toyota Gazoo Racing WRT2	57

=== WRC2 Rally2 ===
==== Classification ====
Position		No.	Driver	Co-driver	Entrant	Car	Time	Difference	Points	
Event	Class	No.	Driver	Co-driver	Entrant	Car	Time	Difference	Class	Event
6	1	21	Oliver Solberg	Elliott Edmondson	Printsport	Toyota GR Yaris Rally2	4:22:54.8	0.0	25	8
7	2	23	Gus Greensmith	Jonas Andersson	Gus Greensmith	Škoda Fabia RS Rally2	4:23:48.6	+53.8	17	6
8	3	20	Yohan Rossel	Arnaud Dunand	PH Sport	Citroën C3 Rally2	4:24:03.8	+1:09.0	15	4
9	4	35	Kajetan Kajetanowicz	Maciej Szczepaniak	Kajetan Kajetanowicz	Toyota GR Yaris Rally2	4:25:16.8	+2:22.0	12	2
10	5	25	Alejandro Cachón	Borja Rozada	Toyota España	Toyota GR Yaris Rally2	4:26:40.0	+3:45.2	10	1
11	6	43	Martin Prokop	Michal Ernst	Martin Prokop	Škoda Fabia RS Rally2	4:27:14.6	+4:19.8	8	0
13	7	34	Emil Lindholm	Reeta Hämäläinen	Toksport WRT	Škoda Fabia RS Rally2	4:29:45.8	+6:51.0	6	0
14	8	44	Robert Virves	Jakko Viilo	Toksport WRT	Škoda Fabia RS Rally2	4:30:36.6	+7:41.8	4	0
16	9	28	Léo Rossel	Guillaume Mercoiret	PH Sport	Citroën C3 Rally2	4:34:34.0	+11:39.3	2	0
17	10	31	Lauri Joona	Samu Vaaleri	Lauri Joona	Škoda Fabia RS Rally2	4:34:53.6	+11:58.8	1	0
18	11	27	Roberto Daprà	Luca Guglielmetti	Roberto Daprà	Škoda Fabia RS Rally2	4:36:33.4	+13:38.6	0	0
20	12	51	Abdulaziz Al-Kuwari	Lorcan Moore	Abdulaziz Al-Kuwari	Citroën C3 Rally2	4:42:41.5	+19:46.7	0	0
23	13	58	Miguel Granados	Marc Martí	Miguel Granados	Škoda Fabia RS Rally2	4:46:47.3	+23:52.5	0	0
24	14	24	Jan Solans	Rodrigo Sanjuan de Eusebio	PH.Ph	Toyota GR Yaris Rally2	4:47:47.7	+24:52.9	0	0
28	15	54	Uğur Soylu	Sener Güray	GP Garage My Team	Škoda Fabia RS Rally2	4:53:12.5	+30:17.7	0	0
29	16	23	Fabrizio Zaldivar	Marcelo Der Ohannesian	Fabrizio Zaldivar	Škoda Fabia RS Rally2	4:53:26.6	+30:31.8	0	0
35	17	73	Epaminondas Karanikolas	Giorgos Kakavas	Epaminondas Karanikolas	Ford Fiesta Rally2	5:08:01.3	+45:06.5	0	0
36	18	46	Bruno Bulacia	Gabriel Morales	Bruno Bulacia	Toyota GR Yaris Rally2	5:08:32.4	+45:37.5	0	0
41	19	49	Fabio Schwarz	Bernhard Ettel	Fabio Schwarz	Toyota GR Yaris Rally2	5:20:28.4	+57:33.6	0	0
42	20	39	Yuki Yamamoto	James Fulton	Toyota Gazoo Racing WRT NG	Toyota GR Yaris Rally2	5:23:40.0	+1:00:45.2	0	0
43	21	57	Cristian Dolofan	Traian Pavel	Cristian Dolofan	Citroën C3 Rally2	5:25:40.5	+1:02:45.7	0	0
44	22	53	Bernhard ten Brinke	Tom Woodburn	Bernhard ten Brinke	Škoda Fabia RS Rally2	5:28:05.1	+1:05:10.3	0	0
Retired SS16		56	Eugen Cărăgui	Robert Patrick Fus	Eugen Cărăgui	Citroën C3 Rally2	Retired		0	0
Retired SS16		32	Diego Ruiloba	Ángel Vela	Diego Ruiloba	Citroën C3 Rally2	Retired		0	0
Retired SS15		42	Marco Bulacia	Diego Vallejo	Marco Bulacia	Toyota GR Yaris Rally2	Accident		0	0
Retired SS15		48	Giovanni Trentin	Pietro Elia Ometto	MT Racing SRL	Škoda Fabia RS Rally2	Clutch		0	0
Retired SS14		40	Sarah Rumeau	Julie Amblard	Sarrazin Motorsport – Iron Lynx	Citroën C3 Rally2	Mechanical		0	0
Retired SS11		36	Pablo Sarrazin	Yannick Roche	Sarrazin Motorsport – Iron Lynx	Citroën C3 Rally2	Damper		0	0
Retired SS8		46	Hikaru Kogure	Topi Matias Luhtinen	Toyota Gazoo Racing WRT NG	Toyota GR Yaris Rally2	Accident		0	0
Retired SS8		44	Georg Linnamäe	James Morgan	Georg Linnamäe	Toyota GR Yaris Rally2	Retired		0	0
Retired SS6		41	Alejandro Mauro	Adrián Pérez	Alejandro Mauro	Škoda Fabia RS Rally2	Brakes		0	0
Retired SS5		49	Giorgos Amoutzas	Elias Panagiotounis	Giorgos Amoutzas	Škoda Fabia Rally2 evo	Accident		0	0

==== Special stages ====
Overall
Stage	Winners	Car	Time	Class leaders
SD	Solans / Sanjuan de Eusebio	Toyota GR Yaris Rally2	2:45.4	—N/a
SS1	Solberg / Edmondson	Toyota GR Yaris Rally2	1:21.6	Solberg / Edmondson
SS2	Solberg / Edmondson	Toyota GR Yaris Rally2	19:28.3	Solberg / Edmondson
SS3	Solberg / Edmondson	Toyota GR Yaris Rally2	9:28.5	Solberg / Edmondson
SS4	Solberg / Edmondson	Toyota GR Yaris Rally2	19:25.2	Solberg / Edmondson
SS5	Solberg / Edmondson	Toyota GR Yaris Rally2	13:54.0	Solberg / Edmondson
SS6	Virves / Viilo	Škoda Fabia RS Rally2	15:37.8	Solberg / Edmondson
SS7	Solberg / Edmondson	Toyota GR Yaris Rally2	8:39.6	Solberg / Edmondson
SS8	Solans / Sanjuan de Eusebio	Toyota GR Yaris Rally2	20:16.9	Solberg / Edmondson
SS9	Solans / Sanjuan de Eusebio	Toyota GR Yaris Rally2	12:47.0	Solberg / Edmondson
SS10	Solberg / Edmondson	Toyota GR Yaris Rally2	14:47.7	Solberg / Edmondson
SS11	Cachón / Rozada	Toyota GR Yaris Rally2	20:01.8	Solberg / Edmondson
SS12	Solberg / Edmondson	Toyota GR Yaris Rally2	12:39.4	Solberg / Edmondson
SS13	Solberg / Edmondson	Toyota GR Yaris Rally2	14:19.3	Solberg / Edmondson
SS14	Rossel / Dunand	Citroën C3 Rally2	21:50.4	Solberg / Edmondson
SS15	Rossel / Dunand	Citroën C3 Rally2	17:37.2	Solberg / Edmondson
SS16	Greensmith / Andersson	Škoda Fabia RS Rally2	21:35.9	Solberg / Edmondson
SS17	Greensmith / Andersson	Škoda Fabia RS Rally2	17:18.1	Solberg / Edmondson

Challenger
Stage	Winners	Car	Time	Class leaders
SD	Solans / Sanjuan de Eusebio	Toyota GR Yaris Rally2	2:45.4	—N/a
SS1	Virves / Viilo	Škoda Fabia RS Rally2	1:21.8	Virves / Viilo
SS2	Kajetanowicz / Szczepaniak	Toyota GR Yaris Rally2	19:48.5	Kajetanowicz / Szczepaniak
SS3	Virves / Viilo	Škoda Fabia RS Rally2	9:29.2	Kajetanowicz / Szczepaniak
SS4	Kajetanowicz / Szczepaniak	Toyota GR Yaris Rally2	19:35.1	Kajetanowicz / Szczepaniak
SS5	Virves / Viilo	Škoda Fabia RS Rally2	13:54.1	Kajetanowicz / Szczepaniak
SS6	Virves / Viilo	Škoda Fabia RS Rally2	15:37.8	Kajetanowicz / Szczepaniak
SS7	Kajetanowicz / Szczepaniak	Toyota GR Yaris Rally2	8:43.2	Kajetanowicz / Szczepaniak
SS8	Solans / Sanjuan de Eusebio	Toyota GR Yaris Rally2	20:16.9	Kajetanowicz / Szczepaniak
SS9	Solans / Sanjuan de Eusebio	Toyota GR Yaris Rally2	12:47.0	Kajetanowicz / Szczepaniak
SS10	Kajetanowicz / Szczepaniak	Toyota GR Yaris Rally2	14:50.9	Kajetanowicz / Szczepaniak
SS11	Cachón / Rozada	Toyota GR Yaris Rally2	20:01.8	Kajetanowicz / Szczepaniak
SS12	Solans / Sanjuan de Eusebio	Toyota GR Yaris Rally2	12:42.4	Kajetanowicz / Szczepaniak
SS13	Joona / Vaaleri	Škoda Fabia RS Rally2	14:32.1	Kajetanowicz / Szczepaniak
SS14	Joona / Vaaleri	Škoda Fabia RS Rally2	22:07.9	Kajetanowicz / Szczepaniak
SS15	Virves / Viilo	Škoda Fabia RS Rally2	17:37.3	Kajetanowicz / Szczepaniak
SS16	Cachón / Rozada	Toyota GR Yaris Rally2	21:52.3	Kajetanowicz / Szczepaniak
SS17	Virves / Viilo	Škoda Fabia RS Rally2	17:29.8	Kajetanowicz / Szczepaniak

==== Championship standings ====
Drivers' Standings
Move	Pos.	Driver	Points
1	1	Oliver Solberg	85
1	2	Yohan Rossel	82
1	3	Gus Greensmith	57
1	4	Roberto Daprà	49
	5	Jan Solans	39

Co-drivers' Standings
Move	Pos.	Driver	Points
1	1	Elliott Edmondson	85
1	2	Arnaud Dunand	82
1	3	Jonas Andersson	57
1	4	Luca Guglielmetti	41
	5	Rodrigo Sanjuan de Eusebio	39

Manufacturers' Standings
Move	Pos.	Driver	Points
	1	PH Sport	163
	2	Toyota Gazoo Racing WRT NG	89
	3	Sarrazin Motorsport – Iron Lynx	64
	4	Toksport WRT	64

Challenger Drivers' Standings
Move	Pos.	Driver	Points
	1	Roberto Daprà	71
2	2	Kajetan Kajetanowicz	62
1	3	Jan Solans	55
1	4	Roope Korhonen	50
3	5	Alejandro Cachón	42

Challenger Co-drivers' Standings
Move	Pos.	Driver	Points
3	1	Maciej Szczepaniak	62
1	3	Luca Guglielmetti	56
2	3	Diego Sanjuan de Eusebio	55
2	4	Anssi Viinikka	50
3	5	Borja Rozada	42

=== WRC3 Rally3 ===
==== Classification ====
Position		No.	Driver	Co-driver	Entrant	Car	Time	Difference	Points
Event	Class	No.	Driver	Co-driver	Entrant	Car	Time	Difference	Points
19	1	68	Ali Türkkan	Oytun Albayrak	Castrol Ford Team Türkiye	Ford Fiesta Rally3	4:03:55.4	0.0	25
21	2	63	Taylor Gill	Daniel Brkic	FIA Rally Star	Ford Fiesta Rally3	4:45:23.1	+5:51.4	17
22	3	71	Diego Dominguez Jr.	Rogelio Peñate	Diego Dominguez Jr.	Ford Fiesta Rally3	4:45:48.8	+6:17.1	15
25	4	65	Kerem Kazaz	Corentin Silvestre	Team Petrol Ofisi	Ford Fiesta Rally3	4:49:53.5	+10:21.8	12
32	5	58	Efthimios Halkias	Nikos Komnos	Efthimios Halkias	Renault Clio Rally3	5:05:22.5	+25:50.8	10
37	6	70	Max Smart	Malcolm Read	FIA Rally Star	Ford Fiesta Rally3	5:13:23.1	+33:51.4	8
38	7	59	Giorgos Delaportas	Evangelos Panaritis	Giorgos Delaportas	Ford Fiesta Rally3	5:14:24.6	+34:52.9	6
40	8	72	Claire Schönborn	Jara Hain	WRC Young Driver Program	Ford Fiesta Rally3	5:18:20.2	+38:48.5	4
48	9	62	Giorgos Dodos	Nikos Intzoglou	Giorgos Dodos	Renault Clio Rally3	6:14:49.3	+1:35:17.6	2
49	10	61	Georgios Vasilakis	Allan Harryman	Georgios Vasilakis	Ford Fiesta Rally3	7:15:48.8	+2:36:17.1	1
Retired SS10		60	Stephanos Theocharopoulos	Giorgos Kotsalis	Stephanos Theocharopoulos	Ford Fiesta Rally3	Excluded		0

==== Special stages ====
Stage	Winners	Car	Time	Class leaders
SD	Gill / Brkic	Ford Fiesta Rally3	2:54.2	—N/a
SS1	Türkkan / Albayrak	Ford Fiesta Rally3	1:28.4	Türkkan / Albayrak
SS2	Türkkan / Albayrak	Ford Fiesta Rally3	20:35.5	Türkkan / Albayrak
SS3	Türkkan / Albayrak	Ford Fiesta Rally3	9:49.4	Türkkan / Albayrak
SS4	Türkkan / Albayrak	Ford Fiesta Rally3	20:37.2	Türkkan / Albayrak
SS5	Türkkan / Albayrak	Ford Fiesta Rally3	14:53.5	Türkkan / Albayrak
SS6	Türkkan / Albayrak	Ford Fiesta Rally3	16:21.8	Türkkan / Albayrak
SS7	Gill / Brkic	Ford Fiesta Rally3	9:34.6	Türkkan / Albayrak
SS8	Gill / Brkic	Ford Fiesta Rally3	21:02.0	Türkkan / Albayrak
SS9	Gill / Brkic	Ford Fiesta Rally3	13:13.1	Türkkan / Albayrak
SS10	stage cancelled			
SS11	Türkkan / Albayrak	Ford Fiesta Rally3	21:05.8	Türkkan / Albayrak
SS12	Türkkan / Albayrak	Ford Fiesta Rally3	13:32.8	Türkkan / Albayrak
SS13	Türkkan / Albayrak	Ford Fiesta Rally3	16:02.0	Türkkan / Albayrak
SS14	Dominguez Jr. / Peñate	Ford Fiesta Rally3	23:14.4	Türkkan / Albayrak
SS15	Halkias / Komnos	Ford Fiesta Rally3	18:03.7	Türkkan / Albayrak
SS16	Dominguez Jr. / Peñate	Ford Fiesta Rally3	23:15.2	Türkkan / Albayrak
SS17	Dominguez Jr. / Peñate	Ford Fiesta Rally3	18:41.8	Türkkan / Albayrak

==== Championship standings ====
Drivers' Standings
Move	Pos.	Driver	Points
1	1	Taylor Gill	67
1	2	Matteo Fontana	59
1	3	Kerem Kazaz	49
1	4	Arthur Pelamourges	42
5	5	Ali Türkkan	42

Co-drivers' Standings
Move	Pos.	Driver	Points
1	1	Daniel Brkic	67
1	2	Alessandro Arnaboldi	59
1	3	Corentin Silvestre	49
1	4	Bastien Pouget	42
5	5	Oytun Albaykar	42

=== JWRC Rally3 ===
==== Classification ====
Position		No.	Driver	Co-driver	Entrant	Car	Time	Difference	Points	
Event	Class	No.	Driver	Co-driver	Entrant	Car	Time	Difference	Class	Stage
19	1	68	Ali Türkkan	Oytun Albayrak	Castrol Ford Team Türkiye	Ford Fiesta Rally3	4:39:31.7	0.0	25	7
21	2	63	Taylor Gill	Daniel Brkic	FIA Rally Star	Ford Fiesta Rally3	4:45:23.1	+5:51.4	17	2
22	3	71	Diego Dominguez Jr.	Rogelio Peñate	Diego Dominguez Jr.	Ford Fiesta Rally3	4:45:48.8	+6:17.1	15	1
25	4	65	Kerem Kazaz	Corentin Silvestre	Team Petrol Ofisi	Ford Fiesta Rally3	4:49:53.5	+10:21.8	12	0
31	5	66	Efthimios Halkias	Nikos Komnos	Efthimios Halkias	Renault Clio Rally3	5:05:22.5	+25:50.8	10	0
33	6	64	Mille Johansson	Johan Grönvall	Mille Johansson	Ford Fiesta Rally3	5:13:23.1	+33:51.4	8	4
37	7	70	Max Smart	Malcolm Read	FIA Rally Star	Ford Fiesta Rally3	5:14:24.6	+34:52.9	6	0
40	8	72	Claire Schönborn	Michael Wenzel	WRC Young Driver Program	Ford Fiesta Rally3	5:18:20.2	+38:48.5	4	0
Retired SS14		67	Thomas Martens	Max Freeman	Thomas Martens	Ford Fiesta Rally3	Propshaft		0	1

==== Special stages ====
Stage	Winners	Car	Time	Class leaders
SD	Gill / Brkic	Ford Fiesta Rally3	2:54.2	—N/a
SS1	Türkkan / Albayrak	Ford Fiesta Rally3	1:28.4	Türkkan / Albayrak
SS2	Türkkan / Albayrak	Ford Fiesta Rally3	20:35.5	Türkkan / Albayrak
SS3	Türkkan / Albayrak	Ford Fiesta Rally3	9:49.4	Türkkan / Albayrak
SS4	Türkkan / Albayrak	Ford Fiesta Rally3	20:37.2	Türkkan / Albayrak
SS5	Türkkan / Albayrak	Ford Fiesta Rally3	14:53.5	Türkkan / Albayrak
SS6	Johansson / Grönvall	Ford Fiesta Rally3	16:12.5	Türkkan / Albayrak
SS7	Johansson / Grönvall	Ford Fiesta Rally3	9:21.7	Türkkan / Albayrak
SS8	Gill / Brkic	Ford Fiesta Rally3	21:02.0	Türkkan / Albayrak
SS9	Gill / Brkic	Ford Fiesta Rally3	13:13.1	Türkkan / Albayrak
SS10	stage cancelled			
SS11	Türkkan / Albayrak	Ford Fiesta Rally3	21:05.8	Türkkan / Albayrak
SS12	Türkkan / Albayrak	Ford Fiesta Rally3	13:32.8	Türkkan / Albayrak
SS13	Martens / Freeman	Ford Fiesta Rally3	15:38.8	Türkkan / Albayrak
SS14	Johansson / Grönvall	Ford Fiesta Rally3	22:40.3	Türkkan / Albayrak
SS15	Gill / Brkic	Ford Fiesta Rally3	18:03.7	Türkkan / Albayrak
SS16	Johansson / Grönvall	Ford Fiesta Rally3	22:43.5	Türkkan / Albayrak
SS17	Dominguez Jr. / Peñate	Ford Fiesta Rally3	18:41.8	Türkkan / Albayrak

==== Championship standings ====
Drivers' Standings
Move	Pos.	Driver	Points
	1	Taylor Gill	78
	2	Mille Johansson	71
3	3	Ali Türkkan	47
1	4	Kerem Kazaz	38
1	5	Eamonn Kelly	32

Co-drivers' Standings
Move	Pos.	Driver	Points
	1	Daniel Brkic	78
	2	Johan Grönvall	71
3	3	Oytun Albayrak	47
1	4	Corentin Silvestre	38
1	5	Conor Mohan	32

Previous rally: 2025 Rally Italia Sardegna	2025 FIA World Rally Championship	Next rally: 2025 Rally Estonia
Previous rally: 2024 Acropolis Rally	2025 Acropolis Rally	Next rally: 2026 Acropolis Rally
