= Martin Järveoja =

Estonian rally co-driver (born 1987)

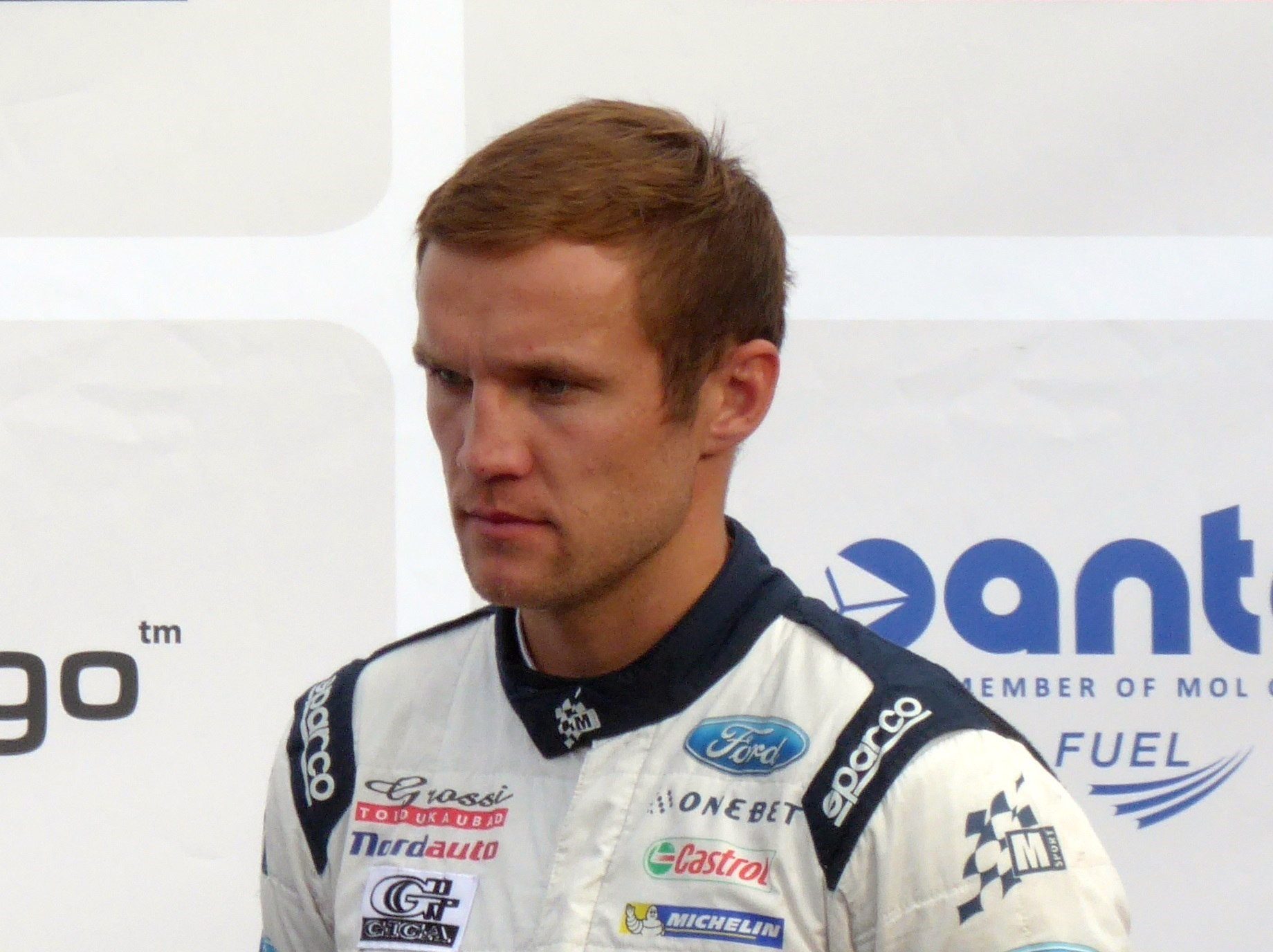
- Järveoja at the 2017 Rallye Deutschland

Personal information
- Nationality: (Estonia) Estonian
- Born: 18 August 1987 (age 39); Elva, then part of Estonian SSR, Soviet Union

World Rally Championship record
- Years active: 2010–2025
- Driver: (Estonia) Karl Kruuda (Estonia) Ott Tänak
- Teams: Hyundai (2020–2022, 2024–2025); M-Sport (2017, 2023); Toyota (2018–2019); Drive DMACK (2016); ME3 Rally Team (2011, 2015); Printsport (2014); MM Motorsport (2013); World Rally Team Estonia (2010)
- Rallies: 147
- Co-championships: 1 (2019)
- Rally wins: 22
- Podiums: 52
- Stage wins: 401
- Total points: 1664
- First rally: 2010 Jordan Rally
- First win: 2017 Rally Italia Sardegna
- Last win: 2025 Acropolis Rally
- Last rally: 2025 Rally Saudi Arabia

Martin Järveoja (Estonian pronunciation: [ˈmɑr.tin ˈjær.ʋeˈojɑ]; born 18 August 1987) is an Estonian rally co-driver. He joined Gazoo Racing Toyota and teamed up with his long time partner Ott Tänak to compete in World Rally Championship.

== Rally career ==
Järveoja is the son of Estonian politician Toomas Järveoja, and originally a Judo competitor (he was five-time champion in Estonia). Järveoja began his rally career in 2006, co-driving for several drivers, including his cousin Ken Järveoja and uncle Tarmo Järveoja, competing in the regional and national championships.

In 2010, Järveoja made his debut in the World Rally Championship, co-driving for Karl Kruuda in Jordan. The pair finished fifth in the 2014 World Rally Championship-2 after wins in Finland and Sweden.

In December 2016, Järveoja signed a contract with M-Sport World Rally Team and formed a partnership with Ott Tänak. He and Tänak claimed their first World Rally Championship victory in the 2017 Rally Italia Sardegna.

From 2018, Järveoja and Tänak competed for Toyota Gazoo Racing WRT. In 2019, they won in Sweden, Chile, Portugal, Finland, Germany and Wales. They were crowned the world champions in Catalunya, with one race to spare.

== Victories ==
=== WRC victories ===
#	Event	Season	Driver	Car
1	(Italy) 2017 Rally Italia Sardegna	2017	(Estonia) Ott Tänak	Ford Fiesta WRC
2	(Germany) 2017 Rallye Deutschland	2017	(Estonia) Ott Tänak	Ford Fiesta WRC
3	2018 Rally Argentina	2018	(Estonia) Ott Tänak	Toyota Yaris WRC
4	2018 Rally Finland	2018	(Estonia) Ott Tänak	Toyota Yaris WRC
5	(Germany) 2018 Rallye Deutschland	2018	(Estonia) Ott Tänak	Toyota Yaris WRC
6	2018 Rally Turkey	2018	(Estonia) Ott Tänak	Toyota Yaris WRC
7	2019 Rally Sweden	2019	(Estonia) Ott Tänak	Toyota Yaris WRC
8	2019 Rally Chile	2019	(Estonia) Ott Tänak	Toyota Yaris WRC
9	2019 Rally de Portugal	2019	(Estonia) Ott Tänak	Toyota Yaris WRC
10	2019 Rally Finland	2019	(Estonia) Ott Tänak	Toyota Yaris WRC
11	(Germany) 2019 Rallye Deutschland	2019	(Estonia) Ott Tänak	Toyota Yaris WRC
12	(United Kingdom) 2019 Wales Rally GB	2019	(Estonia) Ott Tänak	Toyota Yaris WRC
13	2020 Rally Estonia	2020	(Estonia) Ott Tänak	Hyundai i20 Coupe WRC
14	(Finland) 2021 Arctic Rally	2021	(Estonia) Ott Tänak	Hyundai i20 Coupe WRC
15	(Italy) 2022 Rally Italia Sardegna	2022	(Estonia) Ott Tänak	Hyundai i20 N Rally1
16	2022 Rally Finland	2022	(Estonia) Ott Tänak	Hyundai i20 N Rally1
17	(Belgium) 2022 Ypres Rally	2022	(Estonia) Ott Tänak	Hyundai i20 N Rally1
18	2023 Rally Sweden	2023	(Estonia) Ott Tänak	Ford Puma Rally1
19	2023 Rally Chile	2023	(Estonia) Ott Tänak	Ford Puma Rally1
20	(Italy) 2024 Rally Italia Sardegna	2024	(Estonia) Ott Tänak	Hyundai i20 N Rally1
21	(Europe) 2024 Central European Rally	2024	(Estonia) Ott Tänak	Hyundai i20 N Rally1
22	(Greece) 2025 Acropolis Rally	2025	(Estonia) Ott Tänak	Hyundai i20 N Rally1

== Results ==
=== WRC results ===
Year	Entrant	Car	1	2	3	4	5	6	7	8	9	10	11	12	13	14	WDC	Points
2010	World Rally Team Estonia	Suzuki Swift S1600	SWE	MEX	JOR; 22	TUR; 31	NZL	POR; 27	BUL; 18	FIN	GER; 30	JPN	FRA				NC	0
2010	World Rally Team Estonia	Honda Civic Type-R R3												ESP; 28			NC	0
2010	Karl Kruuda	Suzuki Swift S1600													GBR; Ret		NC	0
2011	ME3 Rally Team	Škoda Fabia S2000	SWE	MEX; 15	POR; 13	JOR; 11	ITA; 21	ARG	GRE; 23	FIN; 27	GER; 22	AUS	FRA	ESP; 28			NC	0
2011	Karl Kruuda	Ford Fiesta S2000													GBR; 28		NC	0
2012	Karl Kruuda	Ford Fiesta S2000	MON	SWE	MEX	POR	ARG	GRE	NZL	FIN; 12		GBR; 21	FRA	ITA; Ret	ESP; 23		NC	0
2012	Karl Kruuda	Škoda Fabia S2000									GER; Ret						NC	0
2013	MM Motorsport	Ford Fiesta R5	MON	SWE	MEX	POR	ARG	GRE	ITA	FIN; Ret	GER; 18	AUS	FRA	ESP	GBR		NC	0
2014	Printsport	Ford Fiesta S2000	MON	SWE; 11	MEX	POR; 12	ARG			FIN; 10	GER	AUS	FRA	ESP; 24	GBR; 16		28th	1
2014	Tagai Racing Technology	Peugeot 208 T16						ITA; 15	POL; Ret								28th	1
2015	ME3 Rally Team	Citroën DS3 R5	MON	SWE	MEX	ARG	POR; 26	ITA; Ret	POL; 14	FIN	GER	AUS	FRA	ESP	GBR		NC	0
2016	Drive DMACK Trophy Team	Ford Fiesta R5	MON	SWE	MEX	ARG	POR; Ret	ITA; 11	POL; 23	FIN; Ret	GER	CHN; C	FRA	ESP	GBR	AUS	NC	0
2017	M-Sport WRT	Ford Fiesta WRC	MON; 3	SWE; 2	MEX; 4	FRA; 11	ARG; 3	POR; 4	ITA; 1	POL; Ret	FIN; 7	GER; 1	ESP; 3	GBR; 6	AUS; 2		3rd	191
2018	Toyota Gazoo Racing WRT	Toyota Yaris WRC	MON; 2	SWE; 9	MEX; 14	FRA; 2	ARG; 1	POR; Ret	ITA; 9	FIN; 1	GER; 1	TUR; 1	GBR; 19	ESP; 6	AUS; Ret		3rd	181
2019	Toyota Gazoo Racing WRT	Toyota Yaris WRC	MON; 3	SWE; 1	MEX; 2	FRA; 6	ARG; 8	CHL; 1	POR; 1	ITA; 5	FIN; 1	GER; 1	TUR; 16	GBR; 1	ESP; 2	AUS; C	1st	263
2020	Hyundai Shell Mobis WRT	Hyundai i20 Coupe WRC	MON; Ret	SWE; 2	MEX; 2	EST; 1	TUR; 17	ITA; 6	MNZ; 2								3rd	105
2021	Hyundai Shell Mobis WRT	Hyundai i20 Coupe WRC	MON; Ret	ARC; 1	CRO; 4	POR; 21	ITA; 24	KEN; 3	EST; 31	BEL; 6	GRE; 2	FIN; 2	ESP; Ret	MNZ			5th	128
2022	Hyundai Shell Mobis WRT	Hyundai i20 N Rally1	MON; Ret	SWE; 20	CRO; 2	POR; 6	ITA; 1	KEN; Ret	EST; 3	FIN; 1	BEL; 1	GRE; 2	NZL; 3	ESP; 4	JPN; 2		2nd	205
2023	M-Sport Ford WRT	Ford Puma Rally1	MON; 5	SWE; 1	MEX; 9	CRO; 2	POR; 4	ITA; 35	KEN; 6	EST; 8	FIN; Ret	GRE; 4	CHL; 1	EUR; 3	JPN; 6		4th	174
2024	Hyundai Shell Mobis WRT	Hyundai i20 N Rally1	MON; 4	SWE; 41	KEN; 8	CRO; 4	POR; 2	ITA; 1	POL; 40	LAT; 3	FIN; Ret	GRE; 3	CHL; 3	EUR; 1	JPN; Ret		3rd	200
2025	Hyundai Shell Mobis WRT	Hyundai i20 N Rally1	MON; 5	SWE; 4	KEN; 2	ESP; 6	POR; 2	ITA; 2	GRE; 1	EST; 2	FIN; 10	PAR; 4	CHL; 34	EUR; 3	JPN; 4	SAU; 11	4th	216

=== WRC-2 results ===
Year	Entrant	Car	1	2	3	4	5	6	7	8	9	10	11	12	13	14	WDC	Points
2013	MM Motorsport	Ford Fiesta R5	MON	SWE	MEX	POR	ARG	GRE	ITA	FIN; Ret	GER; 5	AUS	FRA	ESP	GBR		29th	10
2014	Printsport	Ford Fiesta S2000	MON	SWE; 1	MEX	POR; 4	ARG			FIN; 1	GER	AUS	FRA	ESP; 7	GBR; 5		5th	90
2014	Tagai Racing Technology	Peugeot 208 T16						ITA; 4	POL; Ret								5th	90
2015	ME3 Rally Team	Citroën DS3 R5	MON	SWE	MEX	ARG	POR; 11	ITA; Ret	POL; 3	FIN	GER	AUS	FRA	ESP	GBR		25th	15
2016	Drive DMACK Trophy Team	Ford Fiesta R5	MON	SWE	MEX	ARG	POR; Ret	ITA; 3	POL; 10	FIN; Ret	GER	CHN; C	FRA	ESP	GBR	AUS	18th	16

=== JWRC results ===
Year	Entrant	Car	1	2	3	4	5	6	WDC	Points
2010	World Rally Team Estonia	Suzuki Swift S1600	TUR; 6	POR; 2	BUL; 5	GER; 3	FRA		4th	59
2010	World Rally Team Estonia	Honda Civic Type-R R3						ESP; 6	4th	59

=== SWRC results ===
Year	Entrant	Car	1	2	3	4	5	6	7	8	WDC	Points
2011	ME3 Rally Team	Škoda Fabia S2000	MEX; 4	JOR; 2	ITA; 6	GRE; 8	FIN; 7	GER; 5	FRA	ESP; 7	6th	64

Awards
Preceded by Kelly Sildaru (female); Magnus Kirt (male)	Estonian Athlete of the Year (with Ott Tänak); 2020	Succeeded by Incumbent
