= 2011 Rally Italia Sardegna =

8th annual rally of Sardegna

2011 Rally Italia Sardegna Rally Italia Sardegna 2011
Round 5 of the 2011 World Rally Championship season
| ← Previous event | Next event → |
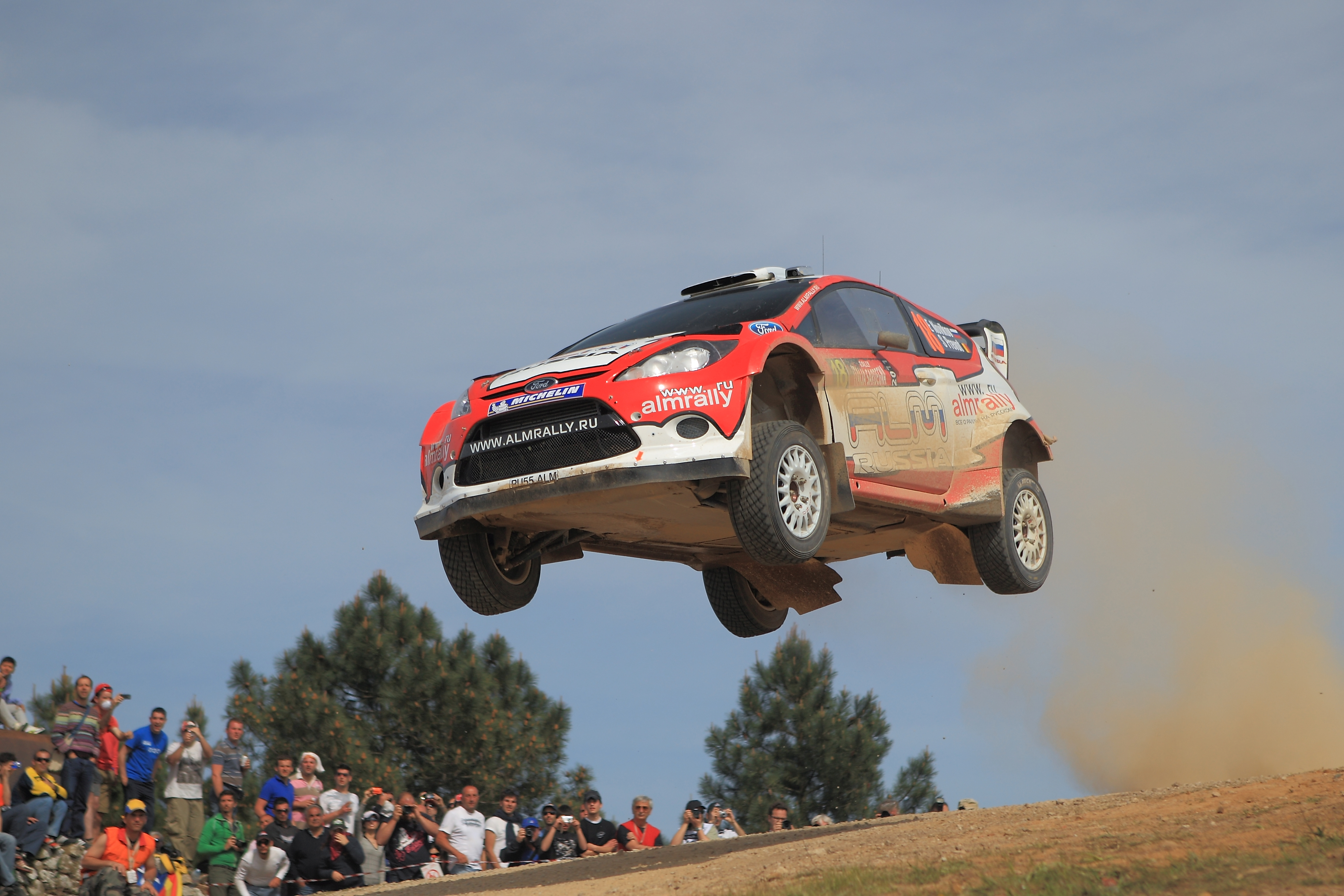
- Host country: Italy
- Rally base: Olbia, Italy
- Dates run: May 6 – 8 2011
- Stages: 18 (339.70 km; 211.08 miles)
- Stage surface: Gravel
- Overall distance: 1,183.52 km (735.41 miles)

Statistics
- Crews: 64 at start, 32 at finish

Overall results
- Overall winner: (France) Sébastien Loeb (France) Citroën World Rally Team

The 2011 Rally Italia Sardegna was the fifth round of the 2011 World Rally Championship season. The rally took place over 6–8 May, and was based in Olbia, the fourth-largest town on the island of Sardinia. The rally was also the third round of the Super 2000 World Rally Championship and the second round of the WRC Academy. Sardinia returned to the WRC calendar for the first time since 2009, after the event was a part of the Intercontinental Rally Challenge in 2010.

Sébastien Loeb took his second win of the season and the 64th WRC win of his career after holding off challenges from Mikko Hirvonen and Petter Solberg on the final day of the rally, despite having to run most of the event first on the road and being disadvantaged by sweeping away loose gravel. In the junior classes, Ott Tänak won his first SWRC event by finishing seventh overall, 26.7 seconds ahead of Juho Hänninen, who was eighth overall. Egon Kaur won the WRC Academy for the second event running.

== Results ==
=== Event standings ===
| Pos. | Driver | Co-driver | Car | Time | Difference | Points |
|---|---|---|---|---|---|---|
| 1. | (France) Sébastien Loeb | (Monaco) Daniel Elena | Citroën DS3 WRC | 3:45:40.9 | 0.0 | 26 |
| 2. | (Finland) Mikko Hirvonen | (Finland) Jarmo Lehtinen | Ford Fiesta RS WRC | 3:45:52.1 | 11.2 | 21 |
| 3. | (Norway) Petter Solberg | (United Kingdom) Chris Patterson | Citroën DS3 WRC | 3:46:04.7 | 23.8 | 15 |
| 4. | (France) Sébastien Ogier | (France) Julien Ingrassia | Citroën DS3 WRC | 3:47:12.4 | 1:31.5 | 12 |
| 5. | (Norway) Mads Østberg | (Sweden) Jonas Andersson | Ford Fiesta RS WRC | 3:48:23.5 | 2:42.6 | 10 |
| 6. | (Spain) Dani Sordo | (Spain) Carlos del Barrio | Mini John Cooper Works WRC | 3:49:08.5 | 3:27.6 | 8 |
| 7. | (Estonia) Ott Tänak | (Estonia) Kuldar Sikk | Ford Fiesta S2000 | 3:52:51.8 | 7:10.9 | 6 |
| 8. | (Finland) Juho Hänninen | (Finland) Mikko Markkula | Škoda Fabia S2000 | 3:53:18.5 | 7:37.6 | 4 |
| 9. | (United Kingdom) Matthew Wilson | (United Kingdom) Scott Martin | Ford Fiesta RS WRC | 3:53:41.3 | 8:00.4 | 2 |
| 10. | (Czech Republic) Martin Prokop | (Czech Republic) Jan Tománek | Ford Fiesta S2000 | 3:57:09.1 | 11:28.2 | 1 |
SWRC
| 1. (7.) | (Estonia) Ott Tänak | (Estonia) Kuldar Sikk | Ford Fiesta S2000 | 3:52:51.8 | 0.0 | 25 |
| 2. (8.) | (Finland) Juho Hänninen | (Finland) Mikko Markkula | Škoda Fabia S2000 | 3:53:18.5 | 26.7 | 18 |
| 3. (10.) | (Czech Republic) Martin Prokop | (Czech Republic) Jan Tománek | Ford Fiesta S2000 | 3:57:09.1 | 4:17.3 | 15 |
| 4. (11.) | (Qatar) Nasser Al-Attiyah | (Italy) Giovanni Bernacchini | Ford Fiesta S2000 | 3:58:14.7 | 5:22.9 | 12 |
| 5. (16.) | (Germany) Hermann Gassner, Jr. | (Germany) Kathi Wüstenhagen | Škoda Fabia S2000 | 4:06:23.4 | 13:31.6 | 10 |
| 6. (21.) | (Estonia) Karl Kruuda | (Estonia) Martin Järveoja | Škoda Fabia S2000 | 4:22:45.6 | 29:53.8 | 8 |
| 7. (24.) | (Hungary) Frigyes Turán | (Hungary) Gábor Zsiros | Ford Fiesta S2000 | 4:35:09.8 | 42:18.0 | 6 |
WRC Academy^{†}
| 1. | (Estonia) Egon Kaur | (Estonia) Erik Lepikson | Ford Fiesta R2 | 3:29:39.4 | 0.0 | 30 |
| 2. | (Argentina) Miguel Baldoni | (Argentina) Fernando Mussano | Ford Fiesta R2 | 3:31:21.5 | 1:42.1 | 18 |
| 3. | (Sweden) Fredrik Åhlin | (Sweden) Bjorn Nilsson | Ford Fiesta R2 | 3:32:21.7 | 2:42.3 | 15 |
| 4. | (Czech Republic) Jan Černý | (Czech Republic) Pavel Kohout | Ford Fiesta R2 | 3:46:22.3 | 16:42.9 | 12 |
| 5. | (Australia) Brendan Reeves | (Australia) Rhianon Smyth | Ford Fiesta R2 | 3:47:02.5 | 17:23.1 | 12 |
| 6. | (Italy) Andrea Crugnola | (Italy) Roberto Mometti | Ford Fiesta R2 | 3:47:13.3 | 17:33.9 | 10 |
| 7. | (Estonia) Miko-Ove Niinemäe | (Estonia) Timo Kasesalu | Ford Fiesta R2 | 4:01:44.6 | 32:05.2 | 6 |
| 8. | (Republic of Ireland) Craig Breen | (United Kingdom) Gareth Roberts | Ford Fiesta R2 | 4:02:33.6 | 32.54.2 | 8 |

† – The WRC Academy features only the first two legs of the rally.

=== Special stages ===
All dates and times are CEST (UTC+2).

| Day | Stage | Time | Name | Length | Winner | Time | Avg. spd. | Rally leader |
|---|---|---|---|---|---|---|---|---|
| Leg 1 (6 May) | SS1 | 9:33 | Lago Omodeo 1 | 10.21 km | (Norway) Petter Solberg | 5:59.2 | 102.33 km/h | (Norway) Petter Solberg |
| Leg 1 (6 May) | SS2 | 10:25 | Monte Grighini Nord 1 | 21.32 km | (Finland) Mikko Hirvonen | 14:59.1 | 85.37 km/h | (Finland) Mikko Hirvonen |
| Leg 1 (6 May) | SS3 | 11:26 | Alta Marmilla 1 | 14.34 km | (France) Sébastien Loeb (France) Sébastien Ogier (Norway) Petter Solberg | 9:37.8 | 89.35 km/h | (Finland) Mikko Hirvonen |
| Leg 1 (6 May) | SS4 | 12:09 | Monte Grighini Sud 1 | 19.66 km | (France) Sébastien Loeb | 13:45.6 | 85.73 km/h | (France) Sébastien Loeb |
| Leg 1 (6 May) | SS5 | 13:46 | Monte Grighini Nord 2 | 21.32 km | (Finland) Mikko Hirvonen | 14:32.6 | 87.96 km/h | (France) Sébastien Loeb |
| Leg 1 (6 May) | SS6 | 14:47 | Alta Marmilla 2 | 14.34 km | (France) Sébastien Loeb | 9:18.4 | 92.45 km/h | (France) Sébastien Loeb |
| Leg 1 (6 May) | SS7 | 15:30 | Monte Grighini Sud 2 | 19.66 km | (France) Sébastien Loeb | 13:17.0 | 88.80 km/h | (France) Sébastien Loeb |
| Leg 1 (6 May) | SS8 | 17:04 | Lago Omodeo 2 | 10.21 km | (Finland) Mikko Hirvonen | 5:58.6 | 102.50 km/h | (France) Sébastien Loeb |
| Leg 2 (7 May) | SS9 | 9:29 | Coiluna 1 | 29.35 km | (Finland) Jari-Matti Latvala | 17:39.9 | 99.69 km/h | (France) Sébastien Loeb |
| Leg 2 (7 May) | SS10 | 10:36 | Monte Lerno 1 | 27.97 km | (Finland) Jari-Matti Latvala | 18:06.2 | 92.70 km/h | (France) Sébastien Loeb |
| Leg 2 (7 May) | SS11 | 11:15 | Su Filigosu 1 | 14.21 km | (Finland) Jari-Matti Latvala | 8:59.8 | 94.77 km/h | (France) Sébastien Loeb |
| Leg 2 (7 May) | SS12 | 14:39 | Coiluna 2 | 29.35 km | (France) Sébastien Ogier | 17:13.8 | 102.21 km/h | (France) Sébastien Loeb |
| Leg 2 (7 May) | SS13 | 15:46 | Monte Lerno 2 | 27.97 km | (Finland) Jari-Matti Latvala | 17:41.0 | 94.90 km/h | (France) Sébastien Loeb |
| Leg 2 (7 May) | SS14 | 16:25 | Su Filigosu 2 | 14.21 km | (Finland) Jari-Matti Latvala | 8:44.0 | 97.63 km/h | (France) Sébastien Loeb |
| Leg 3 (8 May) | SS15 | 6:50 | Gallura 1 | 8.24 km | (Finland) Jari-Matti Latvala | 6:28.9 | 76.28 km/h | (France) Sébastien Loeb |
| Leg 3 (8 May) | SS16 | 8:03 | Monte Olia | 24.50 km | (Finland) Jari-Matti Latvala | 17:50.7 | 82.38 km/h | (France) Sébastien Loeb |
| Leg 3 (8 May) | SS17 | 8:41 | Terranova | 24.60 km | (Norway) Petter Solberg | 17:26.4 | 84.63 km/h | (France) Sébastien Loeb |
| Leg 3 (8 May) | SS18 | 12:00 | Gallura 2 (Power stage) | 8.24 km | (Finland) Mikko Hirvonen | 6:15.2 | 79.06 km/h | (France) Sébastien Loeb |

=== Power Stage ===
The "Power stage" was a live, televised 8.24 km (5.12 mi) stage at the end of the rally, held in Gallura.

| Pos | Driver | Time | Diff. | Avg. speed | Points |
|---|---|---|---|---|---|
| 1 | (Finland) Mikko Hirvonen | 6:15.2 | 0.0 | 79.06 km/h | 3 |
| 2 | (Finland) Jari-Matti Latvala | 6:16.6 | +1.4 | 78.77 km/h | 2 |
| 3 | (France) Sébastien Loeb | 6:18.0 | +2.8 | 78.48 km/h | 1 |
