= Ott Tänak =

Estonian rally driver (born 1987)

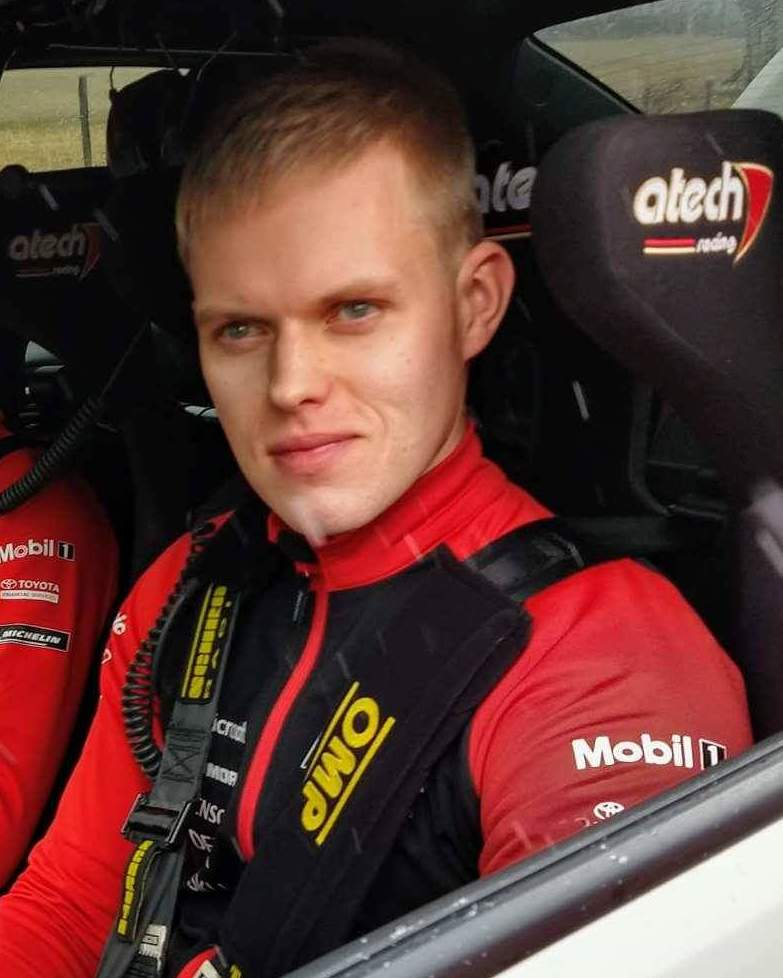
- Tänak at the 2019 Rallye Monte Carlo.

Personal information
- Nationality: (Estonia) Estonian
- Born: 15 October 1987 (age 39); Kärla, then part of Estonian SSR, Soviet Union

World Rally Championship record
- Years active: 2009–2012, 2014–2025
- Co-driver: (Estonia) Kristo Kraag (Estonia) Kuldar Sikk (Estonia) Raigo Mõlder (Estonia) Martin Järveoja
- Teams: Pirelli Star Driver; DMACK World Rally Team; Toyota; M-Sport Ford; Hyundai
- Rallies: 176
- Championships: 1 (2019)
- Rally wins: 22
- Podiums: 58
- Stage wins: 440
- Total points: 1898
- First rally: 2009 Rally de Portugal
- First win: 2017 Rally Italia Sardegna
- Last win: 2025 Acropolis Rally
- Last rally: 2025 Rally Saudi Arabia

Ott Tänak (Estonian pronunciation: [ˈotʲˑ ˈtæ.nɑk]; born 15 October 1987) is an Estonian rally driver and the 2019 World Rally Champion. He most recently competed full-time for Hyundai World Rally Team in the World Rally Championship (WRC) during the 2025 season, before stepping away from full-time competition. In 2026, Tänak joined Toyota Gazoo Racing WRT in a testing and development role, contributing to the manufacturer's preparations for the 2027 season. On 3 November 2026, Toyota announced that Tänak would return to full-time WRC competition in 2027, reuniting with his long-time co-driver Martin Järveoja. Tänak previously won the 2019 World Rally Championship with Toyota Gazoo Racing, securing six victories during his championship-winning season.

Tänak has won 22 world rallies, putting the Estonian eighth on the all-time list. He and co-driver Järveoja achieved their maiden world rally win at the 2017 Rally Italia Sardegna driving for M-Sport Ford. Tänak's maiden drivers' world title followed just two years later, making him the first Estonian to win the drivers' championship, the first non-Frenchman to win the drivers' championship since Petter Solberg in 2003, and the first Toyota driver to win the drivers' championship since Didier Auriol in 1994. He finished as the championship runner-up in 2022, only behind runaway champion Kalle Rovanperä, and he has finished third in the standings on four occasions.

== Career ==
=== Early career ===
Tänak won the Estonian Rally Championship in 2008 and 2009, driving for the team run by former world rally winner Markko Märtin. Tänak made his World Rally Championship debut on the 2009 Rally de Portugal, finishing 20th overall. In September 2009, Tänak won the European Pirelli Star Driver shootout held in Austria. This gave him the opportunity to compete six rounds of the 2010 World Rally Championship season in PWRC support category programme. He won the PWRC category on the 2010 Rally Finland and 2010 Rally GB.

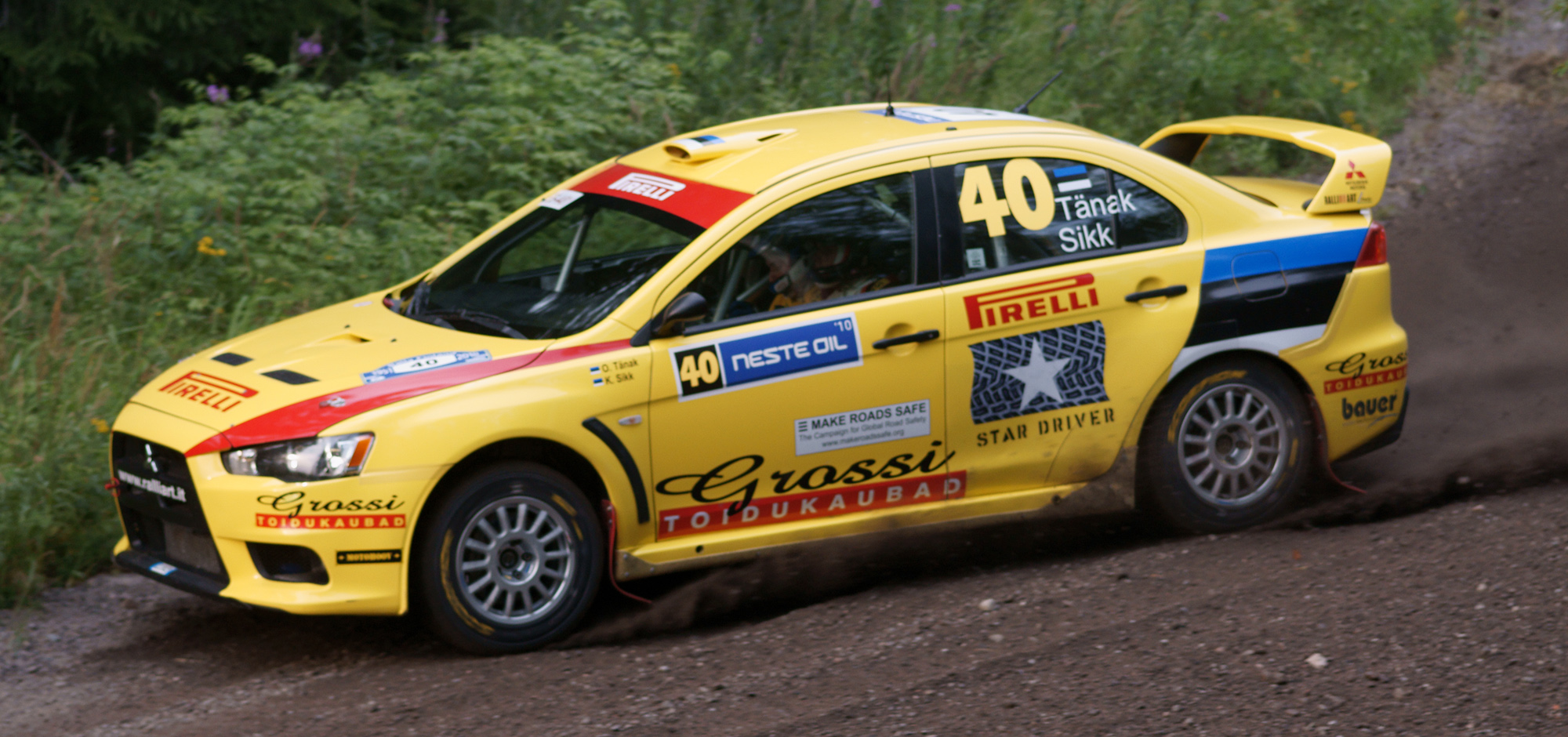
Tänak at the 2010 Rally Finland

=== 2011 ===
In 2011, Tänak drove in seven rallies with a Ford Fiesta S2000, prepared by MM-Motorsport team under Markko Märtin's instructions. He made a five-year contract with Ford.

Tänak scored his first WRC points in the 2011 Rally Mexico, and finished second in SWRC. In Italy, he collected his first class win with an outstanding performance. He continued to impress in Greece, as he was leading after the first day, but rolled his car on the first stage of the second day, and had to retire. In Finland, he finished third, and looked like he has only mathematical chances of winning the title. But with victories in Germany and France, he put himself back into title contention, arriving in Spain only three points behind leader Juho Hänninen. However, he hit a rock on the first stage, breaking his Fiesta S2000's front crossmember, and had to restart under SupeRally rules, meaning that he basically lost all of his chances of becoming the champion. He finished the event sixth in SWRC, and runner-up to Hänninen in the championship standings.

Tänak made his debut in a WRC-spec Ford Fiesta prepared by M-Sport Stobart at the 2011 Wales Rally GB, testing tyre supplier DMACK's tyre compounds in preparation for their entry into the championship in 2012.

=== 2012 ===
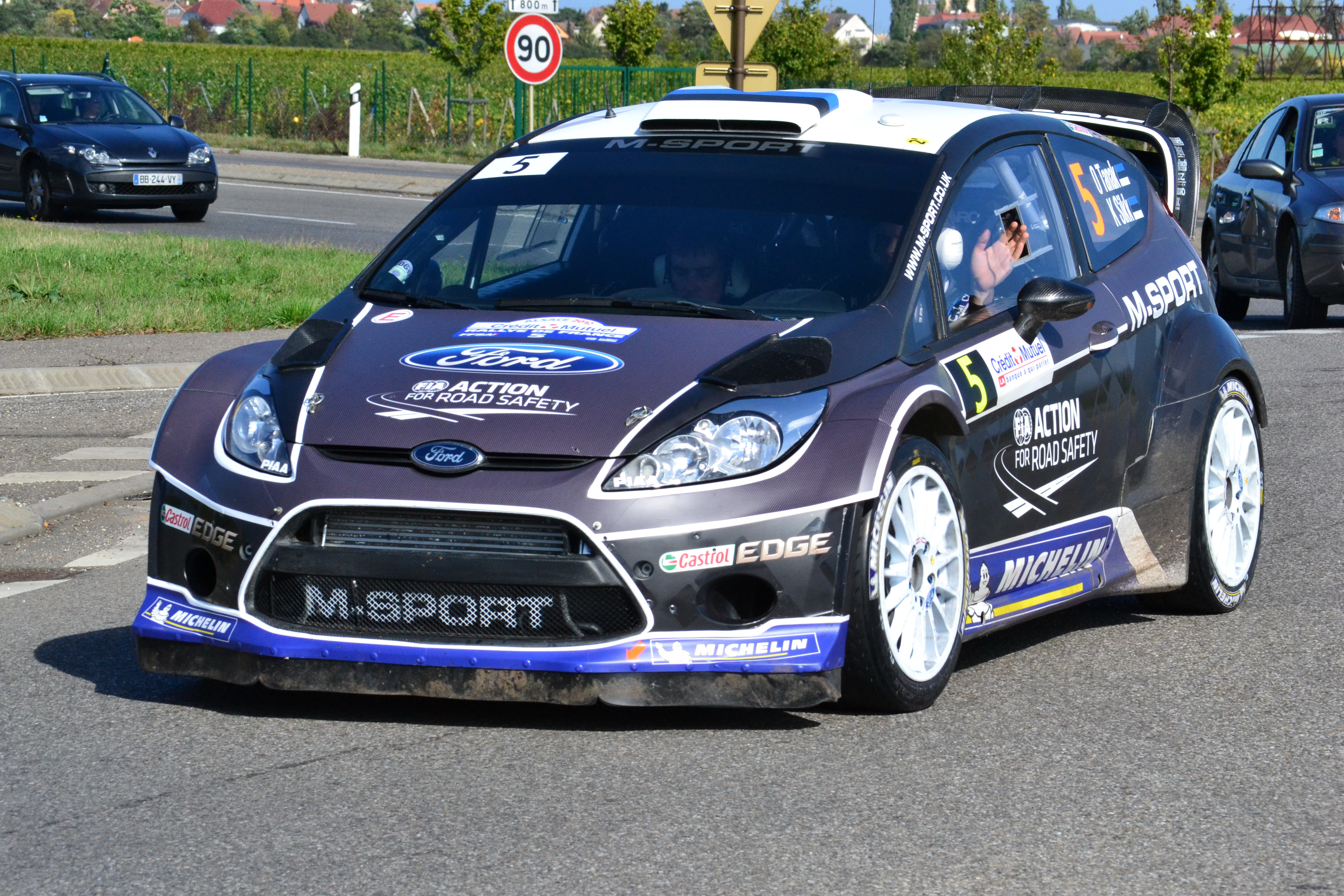
Tänak at the 2012 Rallye de France

In 2012, Tänak was the number one driver for M-Sport Ford World Rally Team, and with a Ford Fiesta RS WRC he drove the full 2012 season. At the Rally Sweden, Tänak took his first stage win on SS14. He later had a season with ups and downs. After retiring in Sweden with engine failure, he finished fifth in Mexico. But in Portugal, he slid off the road, forcing him to return under Rally2 (formerly SupeRally) rules. The next round, Rally Argentina started well for Tänak, but continued badly: he collected punctures, and slid back to 37th, but fought his way back to tenth. In Greece, he was doing well until he had to stop due to suspension damage and had to use Rally2 again. He crashed out in New Zealand, but on Rally Finland, the next round, he bounced back with a sixth-place finish. He followed this up by two crashes in Germany and Great Britain. After these poor performances, he went on to finish sixth in France. He scored his first podium in Italy, the penultimate round of the season, by finishing third behind winner Mikko Hirvonen and Evgeny Novikov. The final round of the season, the Catalunya Rally, was bittersweet to him: on the first day, he was even leading the rally, and was lying fifth when he crashed out on the last stage. He finished eighth in the final standings, winning eight stages during the season.

=== 2013 ===
In the year 2013, Tänak was no longer a part of M-Sport World Rally Team and was forced to leave the WRC stage. He started competing in and leading a team at Estonian national rallies, OT Racing, and the first rally under his direction was Võru Talveralli 2013. Tänak's first competitive rally in 2013 was Rally Tallinn, driving a Subaru Impreza WRX STi N12, in which he finished second, just after Georg Gross, who was driving a 2008 Ford Focus WRC, and just 0.4 seconds ahead of Alexey Lukyanuk, who was driving in a Mitsubishi Lancer Evolution 10. In season total, he finished six rally events, of which one he won and came second in the rest, all behind Georg Gross. At the season finale, Saaremaa Rally, Tänak led the event at the penultimate stage by just 4.4 seconds ahead of Georg Gross. Five stages before the penultimate stage, Tänak, with his WRC experience, knew that he would have to really push in the early morning when others are still waking up. He succeeded and built a lead of 15.9 seconds ahead of Egon Kaur and 20 seconds ahead of Georg Gross. But it wasn't enough, he was driving on the limits of his Subaru Impreza and couldn't go any faster. Georg Gross caught him on the final stage and won by 2.4 seconds. He finished the season by winning the N4 class with three points ahead of Timmu Kõrge.

=== 2014 ===
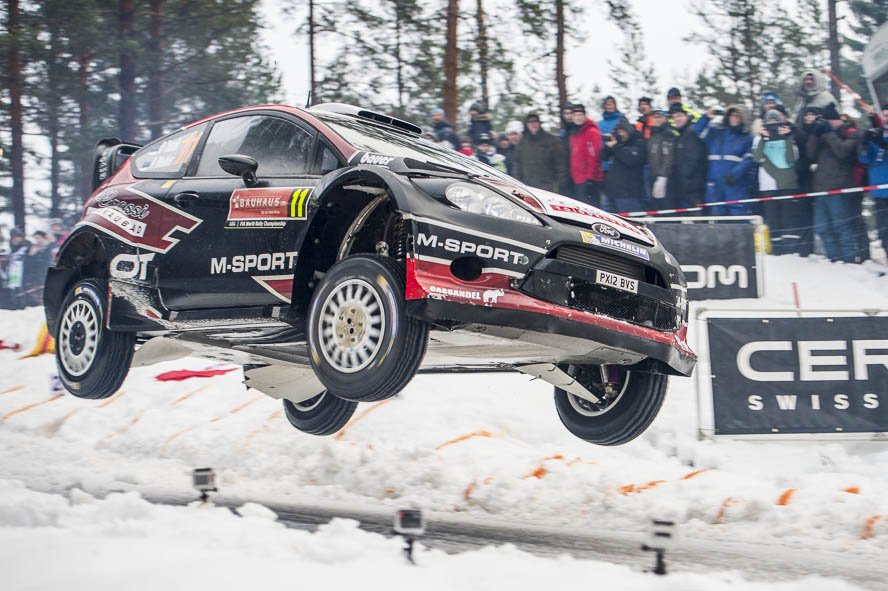
Tänak at the 2014 Rally Sweden

Tänak joined the DMACK World Rally Team in 2014, which he drove under WRC2, and M-Sport, where he took part in Sweden, Portugal and Sardegna with a Ford Fiesta RS WRC. Raigo Mõlder served as his co-driver and his WRC-2 teammate was Jari Ketomaa.

=== 2015 ===
In 2015, Tänak returned to M-Sport Ford World Rally Team following the retirement of Mikko Hirvonen to compete in the Ford Fiesta RS WRC. His best result of the season was claiming third in the 72nd Rally Poland, matching his career-best result.

=== 2016 ===
Tänak left the M-Sport World Rally Team and returned to the DMACK World Rally Team, the team he drove for at selected events in 2014. Tänak achieved two podium finishes during 2016 season. Having dominated most of the Rally Poland, Tänak suffered puncture in the penultimate stage and lost out to eventual winner Andreas Mikkelsen. He picked up another podium in Wales Rally, where he also finished second. Tänak finished the season eighth.

=== 2017 ===
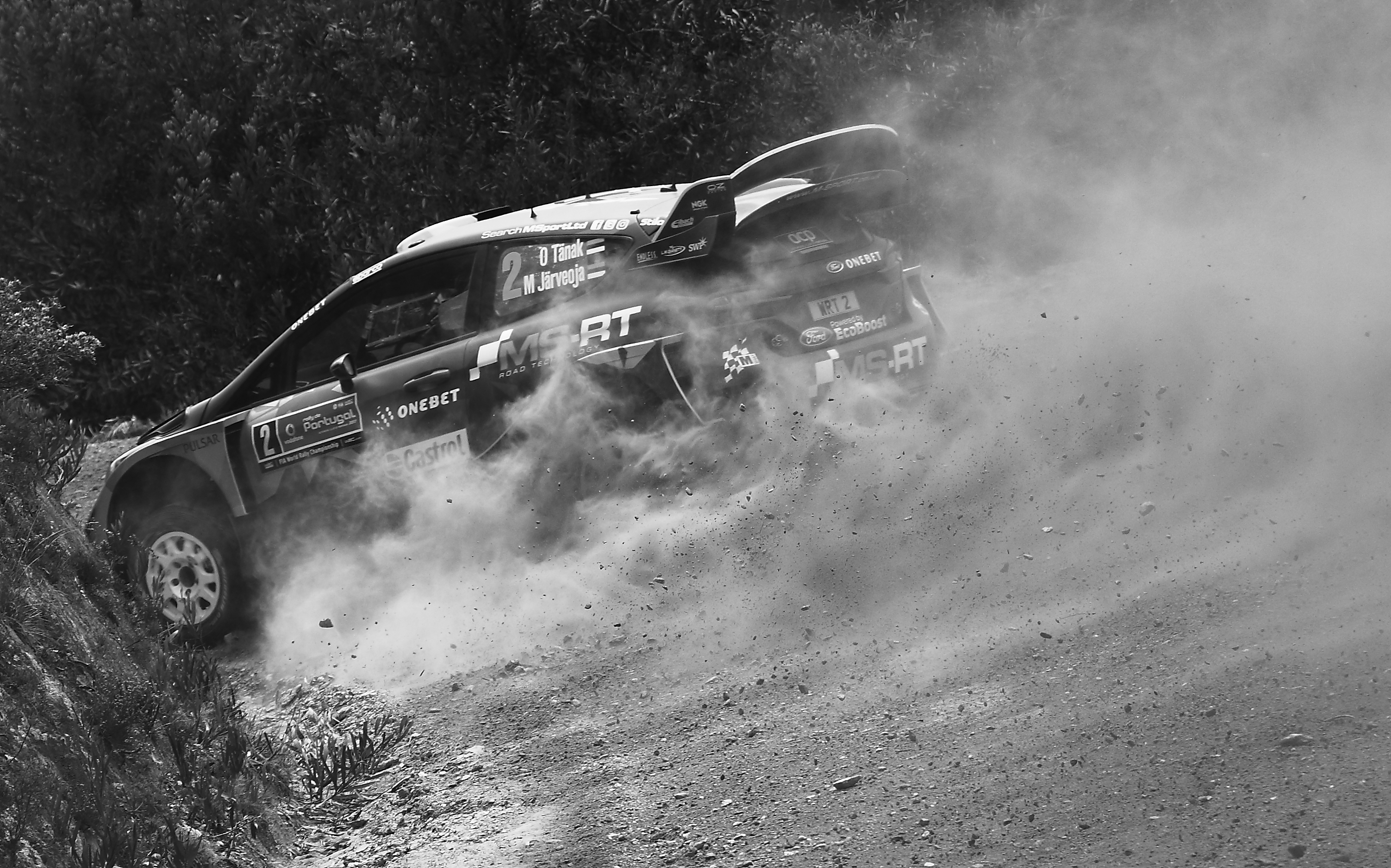
Tänak at the 2017 Rally de Portugal

After a year in DMACK World Rally Team, Tänak returned to M-Sport Ford World Rally Team, teaming up with 4-time world champion Sébastien Ogier, who chose M-Sport after Volkswagen's withdrawal. Tänak changed co-drivers, with Martin Järveoja replacing Raigo Mõlder. Tänak started the year off well, driving himself to third place in both Monte Carlo and Argentina, and to second place in Sweden. In Portugal, Tänak led at the end of day 1, but hit a bank and punctured a tire early on during day 2, eventually finishing fourth. However, in the next round in Sardinia, Tänak inherited the lead after a mistake by Hayden Paddon, and despite a final day charge by Jari-Matti Latvala, finally took his first WRC event win. He squandered the chance of back-to-back wins when he crashed early on during the final day in Poland. After a frustrating seventh-place finish in Finland, Tänak surprised many by taking a faultless win in Germany, marking the first time Ford or M-Sport have won in Germany since it became a WRC event in 2002. He went on to finish the final events of the year third (Spain), second (Wales) and sixth (Australia), guaranteeing him overall third place in the championship behind teammate Ogier and Thierry Neuville.

=== 2018 ===
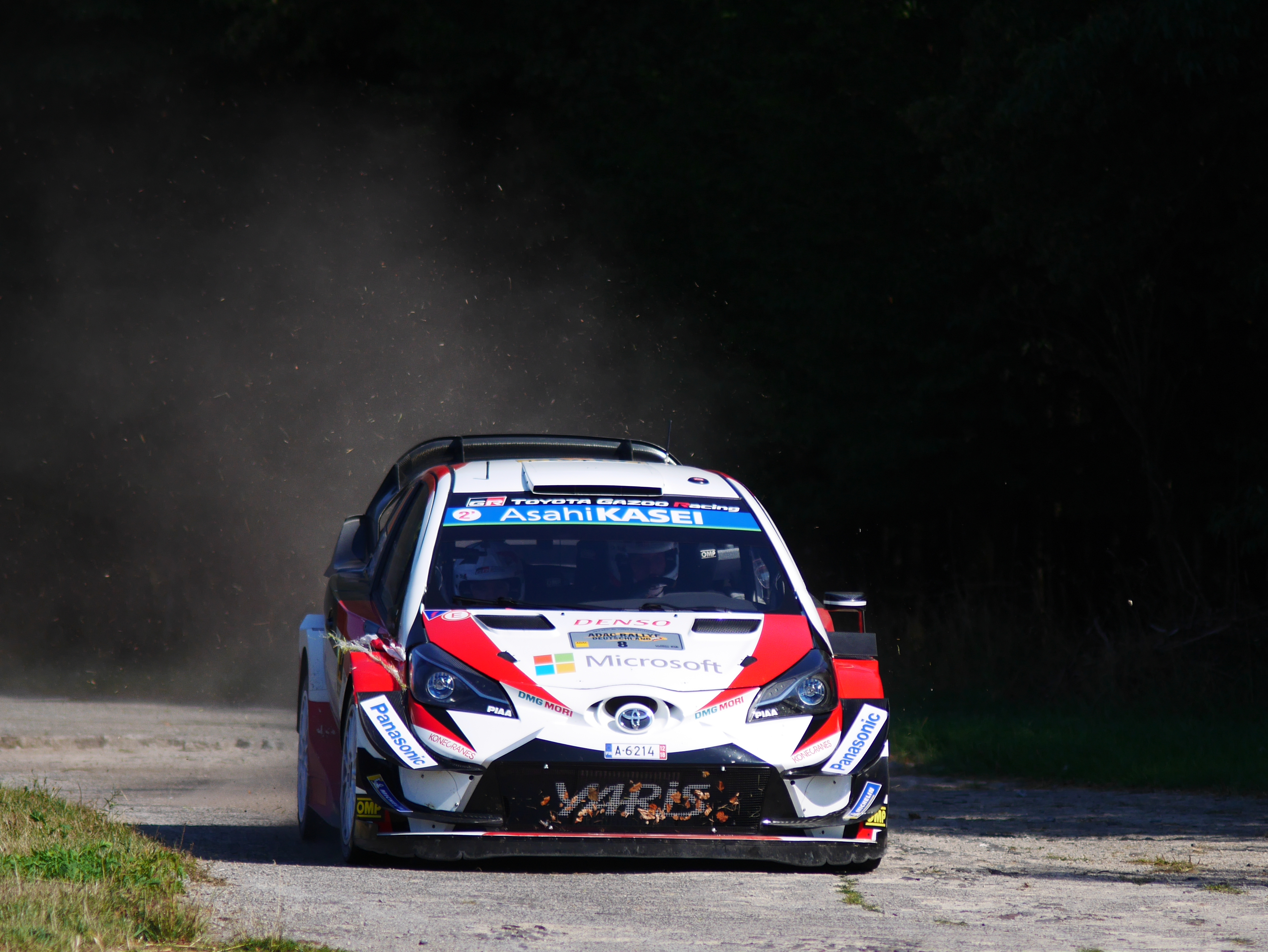
Tänak won the 2018 Rallye Deutschland

Before the 2018 season, Tänak signed a two-year deal with Toyota Gazoo Racing WRT, run by four-time world champion Tommi Mäkinen. His team-mates for the season were Jari-Matti Latvala and Esapekka Lappi. While many speculated that the Estonian would take considerable time to get used to the team and the car, Tänak proved people wrong by showing immediate speed in the Toyota - finishing second in the opening round in Monte Carlo, following it up with another podium in Corsica and winning in Argentina, having led from day one by a strong margin. Both him and his Toyota car demonstrated their highly competitive performance round-after-round, but similarly to Sebastien Ogier, Tänak was hampered by the starting order in Sweden and suffered a turbo failure in the high altitudes at Mexico. Tänak replicated his earlier success in Argentina with three consecutive rally wins in Finland, Germany and Turkey, putting him in striking distance for the drivers' championship behind Ogier and Neuville with three events left. Unfortunate performances in Great Britain and Spain left Tänak with narrow chances at the title, being 23 points off the lead with one event left. Tricky conditions took Tänak out of contention for the title, and he finished the Australian event in fourth. Jari-Matti Latvala's win in the final rally meant that Toyota Gazoo Racing WRT won the constructors championship for the first time since 1999.

=== 2019 ===
Continuing the overall trend from the previous two seasons, Tänak finished third in Monte Carlo behind rivals Thierry Neuville and Sebastien Ogier. He then went on to win in Sweden, marking the first time he had led the points standings in the WRC driver's championship. Leading the championship for the first time in his career, he managed second place in Mexico, retaining first place in the championship over Ogier by four points. Tänak won the debuting Rally Chile ahead of Sebastien Ogier and Sebastien Loeb, and despite a last-minute loss in the 2019 Rally Italia Sardegna, won four more rallies before securing his first driver's championship trophy in the 2019 Rally Catalunya, following an early power steering failure by Ogier in the first leg and a Power Stage victory by Tänak. Tänak became the first non-Frenchman to win the World Rally Championship since 2003.

=== 2020 ===
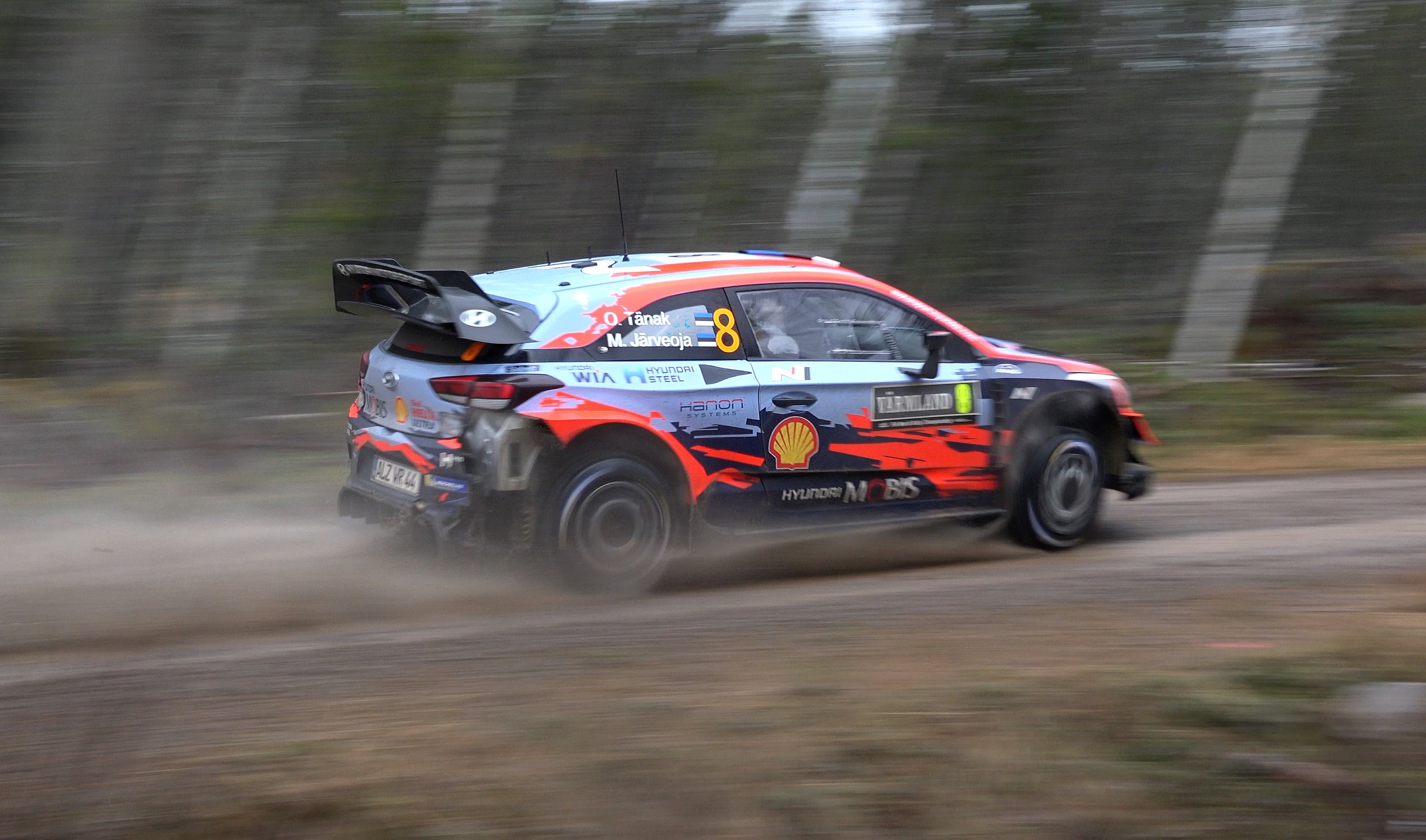
Tänak in his second rally for Hyundai Motorsport, the 2020 Rally Sweden.

In October 2019, Tänak signed a two-year deal with Hyundai. He could have been selected number 1, which is reserved for the champion for the previous season but he decided to keep the number 8 during the season. Tänak's title defence began with a major shunt at the Monte Carlo Rally, with his Hyundai i20 bottoming out on a bump in Stage 4 and flying off a 40 metre high cliff at 180 km/h, rolling end-over-end through a series of trees before landing on the road below – with both him and Järveoja remarkably walking away uninjured. Tänak made up for this with a second-place finish in Sweden, just below Elfyn Evans who won the event.

=== 2021 ===
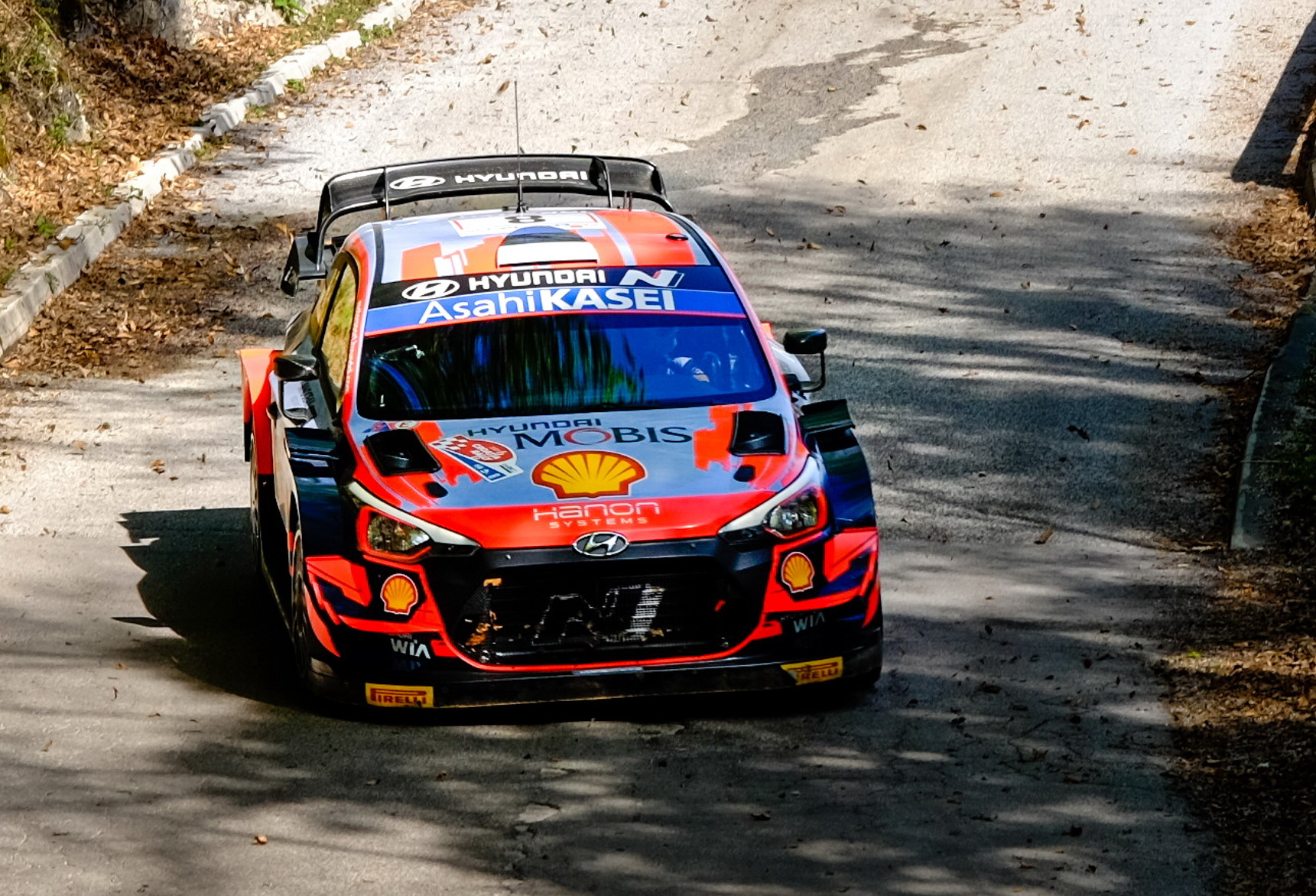
Tänak at the 2021 Croatia Rally.

Hyundai's Hyundai i20 Coupe WRC Car was very fast but reliability issues, mechanical issues and damage cost them points.

Tänak and Järveoja retired from leading the 2021 Monte Carlo Rally and retired from the 2021 Rally Catalunya. He retired from the lead at the 2021 Rally de Portugal because of damage to the rear right suspension. He clipped a rock and crashed out of the lead at the 2021 Rally Italia Sardegna and retired from Day 1 at his Home Rally, the 2021 Rally Estonia due to a puncture.

Tänak also couldn't participate in the final event of the year, the 2021 Rally Monza, due to "personal family matters". Teemu Suninen and Mikko Markkula replaced them for that event.

Tänak and Järveoja Won the 2021 Arctic Rally Finland, and scored three more podiums at the 2021 Safari Rally, the 2021 Acropolis Rally, and the 2021 Rally Finland.

Tänak also finished fourth at the 2021 Croatia Rally and sixth at the 2021 Ypres Rally Belgium. Tänak and Järveoja finished the season in fifth place on 128 points.

=== 2022 ===
With new regulations mandating the use of a hybrid system in place for 2022 and onwards, Hyundai World Rally Team faced a new challenge. Team Principal Andrea Adamo left the team for personal reasons. Hyundai's new Hyundai i20 N Rally1 car was neither competitive nor reliable at the first round in Monte Carlo and Tänak and Järveoja retired from the rally.

Tänak and Järveoja scored their first podium of the season at the Croatia Rally. Leader Kalle Rovanperä lost time to Tänak, who was in second place, due to a puncture. In the penultimate stage of the rally Tänak chose soft tyres over Rovanperä's hards, meaning he not only won the stage, but gained 29.8 seconds over Rovanperä and got the overall lead with 1.4 seconds. In the power stage, he could not match Rovanperä's time and lost the rally by 4.3 seconds.

At the Rally Italia Sardegna, Tänak and Järveoja were fighting with Elfyn Evans and later with Esapekka Lappi for the rally lead on Friday after Evans' retirement. Tänak took the overall lead on SS4 and lost it on SS7 due to transmission issues and reportedly only having three-wheel drive. SS8 and 9 were cancelled. In the opening stage of Saturday, Lappi crashed and Tänak now lead the rally. He held a comfortable lead over Craig Breen and won the rally with nine stage wins.

After a retirement in Kenya, Tänak achieved third place in Rally Estonia, but was clearly behind the Toyotas. There was not much hope for Finland due to lack of speed and readiness of the Hyundai. Tänak was struggling with his Hyundai in Finland, but pushing his car to the limits and risking everything, he beat Toyotas and took his third Rally Finland victory.

Because Neuville had more points than Tänak, he was the favor going to Ypres Rally. Since Rovanperä and Neuville both crashed on Friday, it was up to Tänak to take win also in Belgium and passing Neuville in the championship standings. It was clear that Tänak should be Hyundais number one for the title, but a controversial moment in the next rally in Greece. Where Neuville was leading the rally in front of Ott and of course should have given his place in favor of Tänak, he maintained his position and took the win since there was no team order. Although because Rovanperä was so ahead of Tänak, he secured his title already in the next round in New Zealand. Tänak finished the season in second place with 205 points.

=== 2023 ===
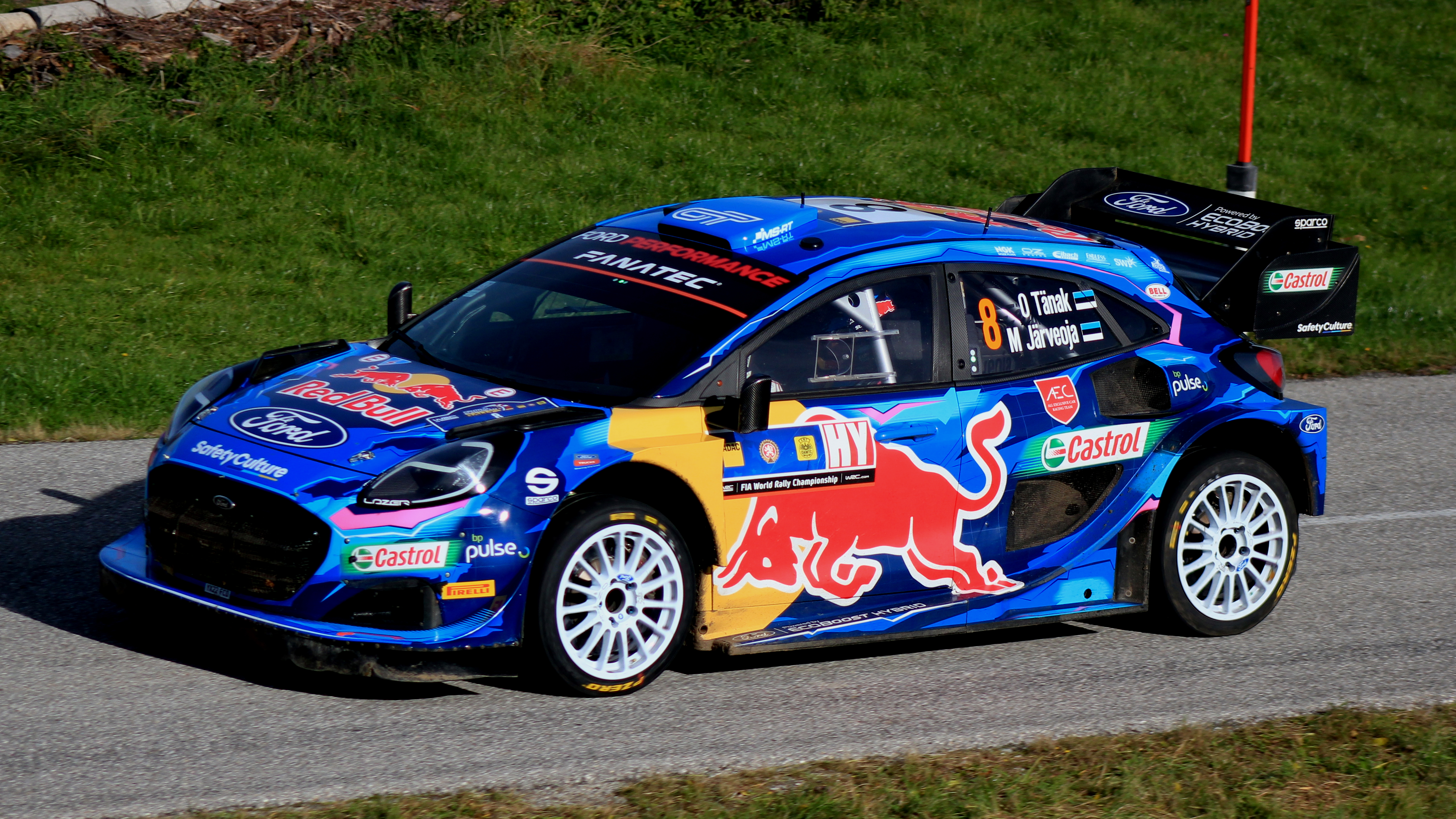
Tänak at the 2023 Central European Rallye with his Ford Puma

For 2023 season, Tänak returned to his old team M-Sport and driving with Ford Puma Rally1 car. In his first rally of 2023 with Puma he achieved fifth place from Monte Carlo Rally. The second round, Rally Sweden, saw Tänak and Martin Järveoja take an early lead, before losing it to Craig Breen and James Fulton on Friday evening. However, Tänak and Järveoja fought back on Saturday evening, and won the event. This was his first win with Ford Puma Rally1 car.

Next rally in Mexico was a disappointment for Tänak after losing a lots of time on Friday but still managed to finish the rally in eighth place. Croatia Rally was an emotional rally after Craig Breen had lost his life during testing for Croatia Rally. Tänak scored an emotional second place in Croatia rally. From that point the real misfortune began, one failure after another and poor reliability of Ford Puma ended his championship hopes. Tänak got his revenge at the Rally Chile where he scored his final victory with M–Sport.

=== 2024 ===
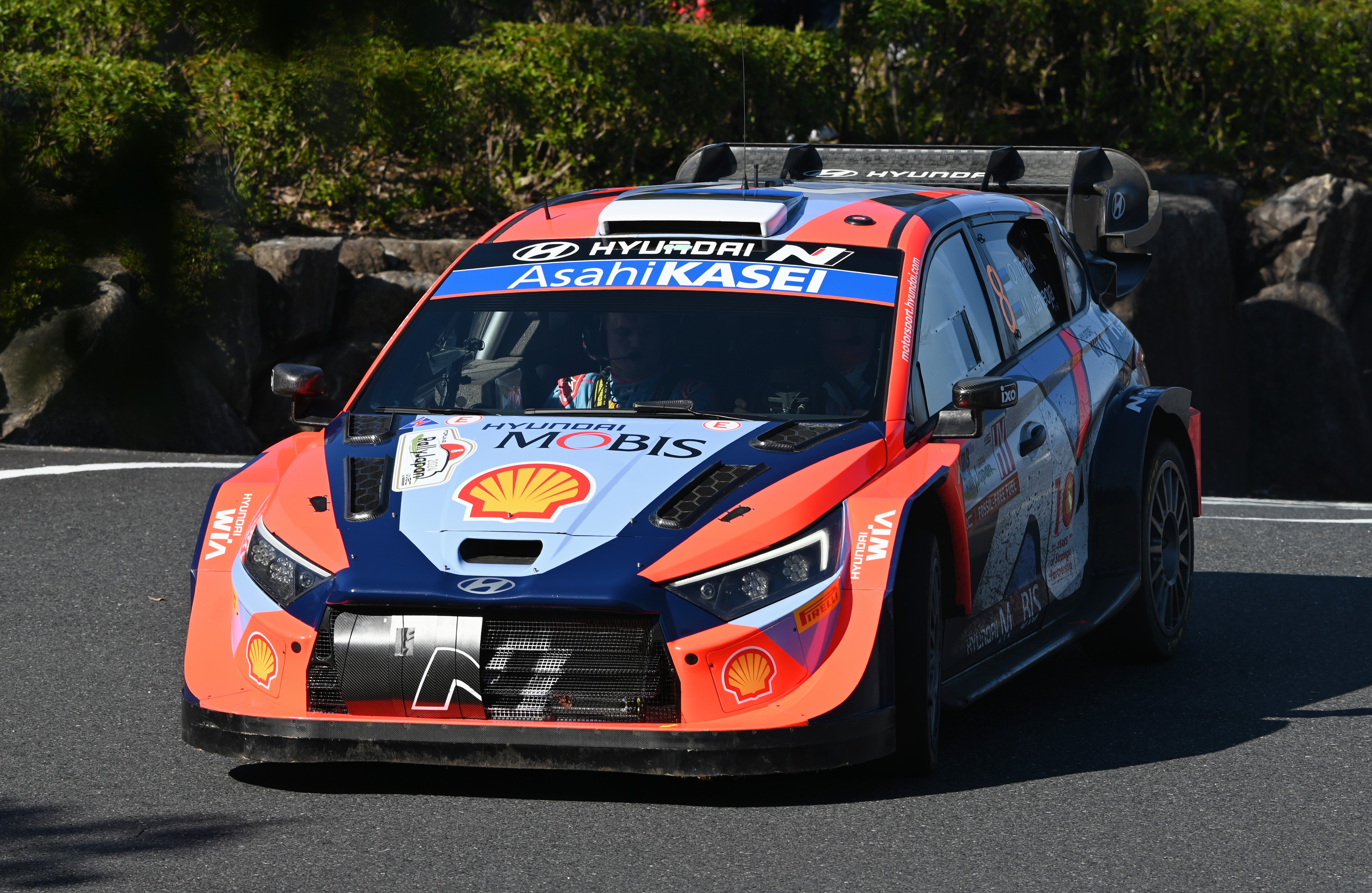
Tänak with his Hyundai at 2024 Rally Japan

In October 2023, it was announced that Tänak would rejoin Hyundai after one year in M–Sport. His first podium of the season came in Portugal when he was fighting for the victory with Ogier and finished second. In Sardegna Tänak was again fighting with Ogier, but this time beating him only by 0.2 seconds repeating the earlier closest finish to a WRC event. Tänak was back in fight for the championship and hoping to gain on the upcoming fast gravel rallies, but hitting a deer at full speed in Poland caused him to retire. After third place in Latvia, Tänak rolled his car in Finland and retired from the rally which hit hard for the championship hopes. He achieved third place both in Greece and Chile but did not manage to reduce the championship gap with Neuville. Tänak won the Central European Rally which left him a mathematical chance to win the championship, but retirement on the last day of Rally Japan left the title to Neuville.

=== 2025 ===
New tire supplier Hankook and change of technical regulations on Rally1 cars, made teams develop their car from new page. At the start of the season it was clear that Hyundai was far behind Toyota in car development. After a modest start to a season, Tänak found himself 52 points behind championship leader Elfyn Evans already after the fourth round. Tänak then went on an incredible charge, hunting down the championship leader Evans. As Hyundai i20 was slowly starting to find pace in gravel, Tänak was fighting for the victory in Portugal and Sardegna. Because of technical problems that prevented him from winning, he still managed to finish second in both rallies behind Ogier.

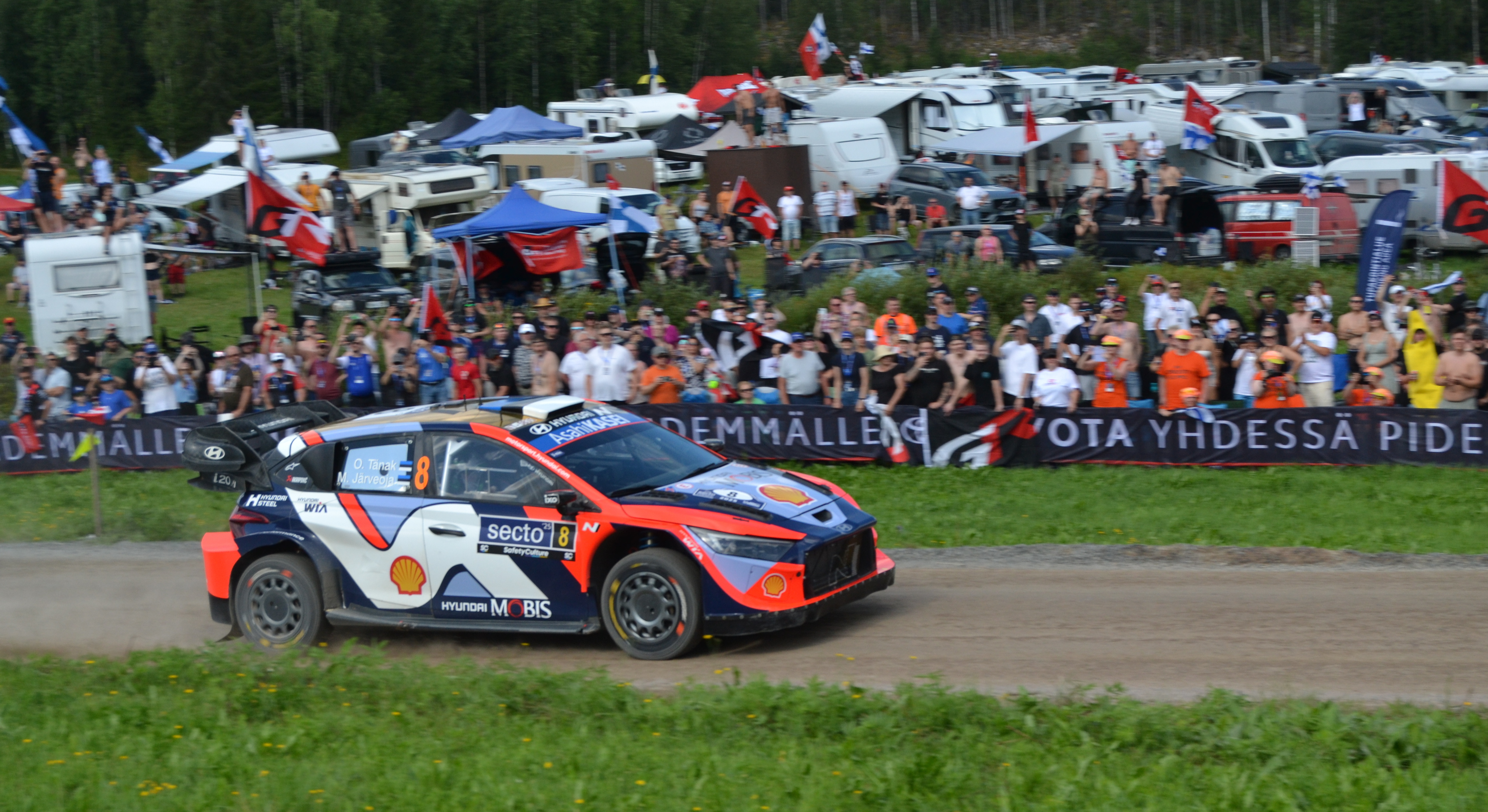
Tänak driving with Hyundai i20 Rally in 2025 Rally Finland

The battle of the champions between Tänak and Ogier continued in Greece, but this time leaving no chance for others and winning the rally in front of Ogier. Despite last stage fright when Tänak's Hyundai was experiencing gearbox failure, they still managed to get back to service park in time to ensure the victory.

In Chile, Tänak went with big hopes to gain on the gravel. He was leading the rally after SS5, but engine failure on the next stage, left him on the side of the road. His engine was changed, but new engine was already worn out, so the new engine started to fail almost immediately. Since both of Tänak's car engines were faulty, they needed a brand new engine, but FIA rules do not allow to use more than two engines per season, so Hyundai came out with a plan to avoid the five minute time penalty, as they changed Tänak's car engine for a new one and Tänak would not be nominated to score manufactures points for the rest of the season.

At the conclusion of the 2025 Rally Japan, Tänak announced that he would be stepping down from full-time rallying, and the WRC, by the end of the season.

=== 2026: Toyota development role and return announcement ===
After stepping away from full-time competition at the end of 2025, Tänak returned to Toyota Gazoo Racing WRT in April 2026, taking on a development and testing role for the manufacturer's new 2027-specification rally car. His first test took place in Croatia, marking his first time driving a Toyota rally car since winning the 2019 World Rally Championship. Tänak continued working with the team throughout the season, contributing to the development of its next-generation Rally1 machinery.

On 3 November 2026, Toyota Gazoo Racing officially announced that Tänak would return to full-time World Rally Championship competition for the 2027 season, reuniting with co-driver Martin Järveoja. The pair were confirmed as part of the GAZOO Racing TOYOTA team, driving the new GR Yaris Rally1 under the championship's revised technical regulations. The move marked Tänak's return to the manufacturer with which he won the 2019 World Rally Championship, following a one-year absence from full-time competition.

== Personal life ==
Tänak was born in Kärla, Saare County. He married Janika Tänak in 2016, with whom he has two children, a son named Ron and a daughter named Mia. In 2017, Tänak was chosen for the Estonian Athlete of the Year award, and in 2018, he and Martin Järveoja were chosen for the Estonian Sports Team of the Year award.

A documentary film about Tänak's life and rallying career titled Ott Tänak: The Movie was announced in December 2018. The film provides a rare look at the Estonian rally driver's early life on the island of Saaremaa and eventual rally career through interviews from his friends, relatives and colleagues in the sport, interspersed with archive and filmed footage of his past and current rallies. It was released theatrically in Estonia on 11 April 2019.

Tänak was also interviewed in the Estonian rally documentary film Legends of the Winding Road.

== Rally wins ==
=== WRC victories ===
#	Event	Season	Co-driver	Car
1	(Italy) 2017 Rally Italia Sardegna	2017	(Estonia) Martin Järveoja	Ford Fiesta WRC
2	(Germany) 2017 Rallye Deutschland	2017	(Estonia) Martin Järveoja	Ford Fiesta WRC
3	2018 Rally Argentina	2018	(Estonia) Martin Järveoja	Toyota Yaris WRC
4	2018 Rally Finland	2018	(Estonia) Martin Järveoja	Toyota Yaris WRC
5	(Germany) 2018 Rallye Deutschland	2018	(Estonia) Martin Järveoja	Toyota Yaris WRC
6	2018 Rally Turkey	2018	(Estonia) Martin Järveoja	Toyota Yaris WRC
7	2019 Rally Sweden	2019	(Estonia) Martin Järveoja	Toyota Yaris WRC
8	2019 Rally Chile	2019	(Estonia) Martin Järveoja	Toyota Yaris WRC
9	2019 Rally de Portugal	2019	(Estonia) Martin Järveoja	Toyota Yaris WRC
10	2019 Rally Finland	2019	(Estonia) Martin Järveoja	Toyota Yaris WRC
11	(Germany) 2019 Rallye Deutschland	2019	(Estonia) Martin Järveoja	Toyota Yaris WRC
12	(United Kingdom) 2019 Wales Rally GB	2019	(Estonia) Martin Järveoja	Toyota Yaris WRC
13	2020 Rally Estonia	2020	(Estonia) Martin Järveoja	Hyundai i20 Coupe WRC
14	(Finland) 2021 Arctic Rally	2021	(Estonia) Martin Järveoja	Hyundai i20 Coupe WRC
15	(Italy) 2022 Rally Italia Sardegna	2022	(Estonia) Martin Järveoja	Hyundai i20 N Rally1
16	2022 Rally Finland	2022	(Estonia) Martin Järveoja	Hyundai i20 N Rally1
17	(Belgium) 2022 Ypres Rally	2022	(Estonia) Martin Järveoja	Hyundai i20 N Rally1
18	2023 Rally Sweden	2023	(Estonia) Martin Järveoja	Ford Puma Rally1
19	2023 Rally Chile	2023	(Estonia) Martin Järveoja	Ford Puma Rally1
20	(Italy) 2024 Rally Italia Sardegna	2024	(Estonia) Martin Järveoja	Hyundai i20 N Rally1
21	(Europe) 2024 Central European Rally	2024	(Estonia) Martin Järveoja	Hyundai i20 N Rally1
22	(Greece) 2025 Acropolis Rally	2025	(Estonia) Martin Järveoja	Hyundai i20 N Rally1

==== Wins per rally ====
3 wins	2 wins	1 win
(Germany) Rallye Deutschland	Rally Sweden	Rally Argentina
Rally Finland	Rally Chile	Rally Turkey
(Italy) Rally Italia Sardegna		Rally de Portugal
		(United Kingdom) Wales Rally GB
		Rally Estonia
		Arctic Rally Finland
		Ypres Rally Belgium
		(Europe) Central European Rally
		Acropolis Rally Greece

=== WRC-2 victories ===
#	Event	Season	Co-driver	Car
1	71st Rally Poland	2014	(Estonia) Raigo Mõlder	Ford Fiesta R5

=== S-WRC victories ===
#	Event	Season	Co-driver	Car
1	(Italy) 8th Rally Italia Sardegna	2011	(Estonia) Kuldar Sikk	Ford Fiesta S2000
2	(Germany) 29th Rallye Deutschland	2011	(Estonia) Kuldar Sikk	Ford Fiesta S2000
3	2nd Rallye de France Alsace	2011	(Estonia) Kuldar Sikk	Ford Fiesta S2000

=== P-WRC victories ===
#	Event	Season	Co-driver	Car
1	60th Rally Finland	2010	(Estonia) Kuldar Sikk	Mitsubishi Lancer Evo X
2	(United Kingdom) 66th Wales Rally GB	2010	(Estonia) Kuldar Sikk	Mitsubishi Lancer Evo X

=== ERC victories ===
#	Event	Season	Co-driver	Car
1	5th Rally Estonia	2014	(Estonia) Raigo Mõlder	Ford Fiesta R5

=== Other notable victories ===
#	Event	Season	Co-driver	Car
1	(Estonia) 41st Saaremaa Rally	2008	(Estonia) Raigo Mõlder	Subaru Impreza STi
2	(Estonia) 13th Lõuna-Eesti Rally	2009	(Estonia) Raigo Mõlder	Subaru Impreza STi N14
3	(Estonia) 44th Saaremaa Rally	2011	(Estonia) Kuldar Sikk	Ford Focus RS WRC 03
4	(Estonia) 50th Saaremaa Rally	2017	(Estonia) Georg Gross	Ford Fiesta RS WRC
5	8th Rally Estonia	2018	(Estonia) Martin Järveoja	Toyota Yaris WRC
6	9th Rally Estonia	2019	(Estonia) Martin Järveoja	Toyota Yaris WRC
7	(Estonia) 19th Lõuna-Eesti Rally	2020	(Estonia) Martin Järveoja	Hyundai i20 Coupe WRC
8	(Estonia) 3rd Otepää Winter Rally	2021	(Estonia) Martin Järveoja	Hyundai i20 Coupe WRC
9	(Estonia) 5th Otepää Winter Rally	2023	(Estonia) Martin Järveoja	Ford Puma Rally1
10	(Estonia) 22nd Lõuna-Eesti Rally	2023	(Estonia) Martin Järveoja	Ford Puma Rally1
11	(Estonia) 56th Saaremaa Rally	2023	(Estonia) Robert Virves	Ford Fiesta R5 Mk. II
12	(Estonia) 23th Lõuna-Eesti Rally	2025	(Estonia) Martin Järveoja	Hyundai i20 N Rally1
13	(United States) 7th Overmountain Rally Tennessee	2026	(Estonia) Martin Järveoja	Toyota GR Corolla Rally RC2

== Racing record ==
=== WRC summary ===
Season	Team	Starts	Victories	Podiums	Stage wins	DNF	Points	Final result
2009	Private/MM Motorsport	2	0	0	0	1	0	–
2010	Private/Pirelli Star Driver	7	0	0	0	3	0	–
2011	Private/M-Sport	8	0	0	0	1	15	15th
2012	M-Sport	13	0	1	8	5	52	8th
2014	M-Sport/DMACK	10	0	0	1	2	17	15th
2015	M-Sport	13	0	1	11	1	63	10th
2016	DMACK	13	0	2	30	2	88	8th
2017	M-Sport	13	2	7	30	1	191	3rd
2018	Toyota	13	4	6	70	2	181	3rd
2019	Toyota	13	6	9	73	0	263	1st
2020	Hyundai	7	1	4	12	1	105	3rd
2021	Hyundai	11	1	4	49	2	128	5th
2022	Hyundai	13	3	8	41	2	205	2nd
2023	M-Sport	13	2	4	30	1	174	4th
2024	Hyundai	13	2	6	29	1	200	3rd
2025	Hyundai	14	1	6	54	0	216	4th
Total		176	22	58	440	25	1898	

=== WRC results ===
Year	Entrant	Car	1	2	3	4	5	6	7	8	9	10	11	12	13	14	WDC	Points
2009	Ott Tänak	Subaru Impreza WRX STi	IRE	NOR	CYP	POR; 20	ARG	ITA	GRE	POL	FIN; Ret	AUS	ESP	GBR			NC	0
2010	Ott Tänak	Subaru Impreza WRX STi	SWE; Ret	MEX	JOR												NC	0
2010	Pirelli Star Driver	Mitsubishi Lancer Evo X				TUR; Ret	NZL	POR; Ret	BUL	FIN; 18	GER; 31	JPN	FRA; 19	ESP	GBR; 17		NC	0
2011	MM Motorsport	Ford Fiesta S2000	SWE	MEX; 10	POR	JOR	ITA; 7	ARG	GRE; Ret	FIN; 13	GER; 12	AUS	FRA; 11	ESP; 27			15th	15
2011	M-Sport Stobart Ford WRT	Ford Fiesta RS WRC													GBR; 6		15th	15
2012	M-Sport Ford WRT	Ford Fiesta RS WRC	MON; 8	SWE; Ret	MEX; 5	POR; 14	ARG; 10	GRE; 9	NZL; Ret	FIN; 6	GER; Ret	GBR; Ret	FRA; 6	ITA; 3	ESP; Ret		8th	52
2014	M-Sport WRT	Ford Fiesta RS WRC	MON	SWE; 5		POR; Ret											15th	17
2014	Drive DMACK	Ford Fiesta R5			MEX; 15		ARG; 17	ITA; 21	POL; 11	FIN; 12	GER; 10	AUS; Ret	FRA	ESP			15th	17
2014	Drive DMACK	Ford Fiesta RS WRC													GBR; 7		15th	17
2015	M-Sport WRT	Ford Fiesta RS WRC	MON; 18	SWE; 4	MEX; 22	ARG; 11	POR; 5	ITA; 14	POL; 3	FIN; 5	GER; 8	AUS; 6	FRA; 10	ESP; 41	GBR; Ret		10th	63
2016	DMACK WRT	Ford Fiesta RS WRC	MON; 7	SWE; 5	MEX; 6	ARG; 15	POR; Ret	ITA; 5	POL; 2	FIN; Ret	GER; 23	CHN; C	FRA; 10	ESP; 6	GBR; 2	AUS; 7	8th	88
2017	M-Sport WRT	Ford Fiesta WRC	MON; 3	SWE; 2	MEX; 4	FRA; 11	ARG; 3	POR; 4	ITA; 1	POL; Ret	FIN; 7	GER; 1	ESP; 3	GBR; 6	AUS; 2		3rd	191
2018	Toyota Gazoo Racing WRT	Toyota Yaris WRC	MON; 2	SWE; 9	MEX; 14	FRA; 2	ARG; 1	POR; Ret	ITA; 9	FIN; 1	GER; 1	TUR; 1	GBR; 19	ESP; 6	AUS; Ret		3rd	181
2019	Toyota Gazoo Racing WRT	Toyota Yaris WRC	MON; 3	SWE; 1	MEX; 2	FRA; 6	ARG; 8	CHL; 1	POR; 1	ITA; 5	FIN; 1	GER; 1	TUR; 16	GBR; 1	ESP; 2	AUS; C	1st	263
2020	Hyundai Shell Mobis WRT	Hyundai i20 Coupe WRC	MON; Ret	SWE; 2	MEX; 2	EST; 1	TUR; 17	ITA; 6	MNZ; 2								3rd	105
2021	Hyundai Shell Mobis WRT	Hyundai i20 Coupe WRC	MON; Ret	ARC; 1	CRO; 4	POR; 21	ITA; 24	KEN; 3	EST; 31	BEL; 6	GRE; 2	FIN; 2	ESP; Ret	MNZ			5th	128
2022	Hyundai Shell Mobis WRT	Hyundai i20 N Rally1	MON; Ret	SWE; 20	CRO; 2	POR; 6	ITA; 1	KEN; Ret	EST; 3	FIN; 1	BEL; 1	GRE; 2	NZL; 3	ESP; 4	JPN; 2		2nd	205
2023	M-Sport Ford WRT	Ford Puma Rally1	MON; 5	SWE; 1	MEX; 9	CRO; 2	POR; 4	ITA; 35	KEN; 6	EST; 8	FIN; Ret	GRE; 4	CHL; 1	EUR; 3	JPN; 6		4th	174
2024	Hyundai Shell Mobis WRT	Hyundai i20 N Rally1	MON; 4	SWE; 41	KEN; 8	CRO; 4	POR; 2	ITA; 1	POL; 40	LAT; 3	FIN; Ret	GRE; 3	CHL; 3	EUR; 1	JPN; Ret		3rd	200
2025	Hyundai Shell Mobis WRT	Hyundai i20 N Rally1	MON; 5	SWE; 4	KEN; 2	ESP; 6	POR; 2	ITA; 2	GRE; 1	EST; 2	FIN; 10	PAR; 4	CHL; 34	EUR; 3	JPN; 4	SAU; 11	4th	216

=== PWRC results ===
Year	Entrant	Car	1	2	3	4	5	6	7	8	9	PWRC	Points
2010	Pirelli Star Driver	Mitsubishi Lancer Evo X	SWE	MEX	JOR	NZL	FIN; 1	GER; 5	JPN	FRA; 2	GBR; 1	4th	78

=== SWRC results ===
Year	Entrant	Car	1	2	3	4	5	6	7	8	SWRC	Points
2011	MM Motorsport	Ford Fiesta S2000	MEX; 3	JOR	ITA; 1	GRE; Ret	FIN; 3	GER; 1	FRA; 1	ESP; 6	2nd	113

=== WRC-2 results ===
Year	Entrant	Car	1	2	3	4	5	6	7	8	9	10	11	12	13	WRC 2	Points
2014	Drive DMACK	Ford Fiesta R5	MON	SWE	MEX; 4	POR	ARG; 8	ITA; 8	POL; 1	FIN; 3	GER; 2	AUS; Ret	FRA	ESP	GBR	6th	78

=== ERC results ===
Year	Entrant	Car	1	2	3	4	5	6	7	8	9	10	11	Pos.	Points
2014	MM Motorsport	Ford Fiesta R5	JÄN	LIE	GRE	IRE	AZO	YPR	EST; 1					11th	44
2014	Drive DMACK	Ford Fiesta R5								CZE; 7	CYP	VAL	COR	11th	44

Awards
Preceded by Rasmus Mägi	Estonian Male Athlete of the Year; 2017	Succeeded by Magnus Kirt
Preceded by Sébastien Ogier	Autosport; International Rally Driver Award; 2019	Succeeded by Elfyn Evans
Preceded by Magnus Kirt (male); Kelly Sildaru (female)	Estonian Athlete of the Year (with Martin Järveoja); 2020	Succeeded by Rasmus Mägi (male); Katrina Lehis (female)
Sporting positions
Preceded by Sébastien Ogier	World Rally Champion; 2019	Succeeded by Sébastien Ogier
