= 2008 Intercontinental Rally Challenge =

Seasons
- ← 2007 2009 →

The 2008 Intercontinental Rally Challenge season was the third season of the Intercontinental Rally Challenge. The season consisted of ten rounds and began on April 4, with the Istanbul Rally. The season ended on December 12 with the China Rally. Nicolas Vouilloz won the title ahead of Freddy Loix and Giandomenico Basso.

== Calendar ==
Rd.	Start date	Finish date	Rally	Rally headquarters	Surface	Stages	Distance
C	21 March	23 March	(Kenya) 56th KCB Safari Rally	Nairobi	Gravel	??	??
1	4 April	6 April	(Turkey) 37th Istanbul Rally	Pendik, Istanbul	Gravel	15	255.77 km
2	8 May	10 May	42th Vodafone Rally de Portugal	Faro, Algarve	Gravel	13	249.74 km
3	27 June	28 June	44th Belgium Ypres Westhoek Rally	Ypres, West Flanders	Asphalt	18	298.88 km
4	11 July	12 July	2nd Rally Russia	Vyborg, Leningrad	Gravel	12	223.24 km
5	1 August	2 August	(Portugal) 49th Rali Vinho da Madeira	Funchal, Madeira	Asphalt	21	292.16 km
6	22 August	24 August	(Czech Republic) 38th Barum Rally Zlín	Zlín, Zlín Region	Asphalt	15	263.06 km
7	11 September	13 September	(Spain) 45th Rally Principe de Asturias	Oviedo, Asturias	Asphalt	15	249.77 km
8	26 September	28 September	(Italy) 50th Rallye Sanremo	Sanremo, Liguria	Asphalt	12	258.51 km
9	24 October	26 October	(Switzerland) 49th Rallye International du Valais	Martigny, Valais	Asphalt	17	266.25 km
10	5 December	7 December	11th Rally China	??	Gravel	13	157.50 km

Safari Rally dropped off the calendar due to political difficulties in Kenya. The Istanbul Rally was added to become the new season opener

== Selected entries ==
Entrant	Constructor	Car	Driver	Co-driver	Rounds
(Italy) Abarth & C. Spa	Abarth	Fiat Abarth Grande Punto S2000	(Italy) Giandomenico Basso	(Italy) Mitia Dotta	1–9
(Italy) Abarth & C. Spa	Abarth	Fiat Abarth Grande Punto S2000	(Finland) Anton Alén	(Finland) Timo Alanne	1–4, 6–9
(Italy) Abarth & C. Spa	Abarth	Fiat Abarth Grande Punto S2000	(Italy) Umberto Scandola	(Italy) Guido D'Amore	5, 9
(Italy) Abarth & C. Spa	Abarth	Fiat Abarth Grande Punto S2000	(Italy) Umberto Scandola	(Italy) Dario D'Esposito	8
(Italy) Abarth & C. Spa	Abarth	Fiat Abarth Grande Punto S2000	(Italy) Andrea Navarra	(Italy) Guido D'Amore	8
(Italy) Abarth & C. Spa	Abarth	Fiat Abarth Grande Punto S2000	(Italy) Alessio Pisi	(Italy) Luca Costantini	8
(Italy) Abarth & C. Spa	Abarth	Fiat Abarth Grande Punto S2000	(Italy) Renato Travaglia	(Italy) Lorenzo Granai	8
(Italy) Island Motorsport	Abarth	Fiat Abarth Grande Punto S2000	(Italy) Renato Travaglia	(Italy) Lorenzo Granai	1, 3, 5–6
Fiat Motorsport Turkey	Abarth	Fiat Abarth Grande Punto S2000	(Turkey) Volkan Isik	(Turkey) Kaan Özşenler	1, 3, 5–6
(Italy) Procar	Abarth	Fiat Abarth Grande Punto S2000	(Spain) Daniel Solà	(Spain) Oscar Sanchez	1–4, 7
(Italy) Procar	Abarth	Fiat Abarth Grande Punto S2000	(Belgium) François Duval	(France) Patrick Pivato	2
(Poland) Fiat Cersanit Rally Team	Abarth	Fiat Abarth Grande Punto S2000	(Poland) Michał Sołowow	(Poland) Maciek Baran	1
(Portugal) Fiat Vodafone	Abarth	Fiat Abarth Grande Punto S2000	(Portugal) José Pedro Fontes	(Portugal) António Costa	2, 5
(Italy) H.F. Grifone SRL	Abarth	Fiat Abarth Grande Punto S2000	(France) Didier Auriol	(France) Denis Giraudet	2, 4, 8
(Italy) H.F. Grifone SRL	Abarth	Fiat Abarth Grande Punto S2000	(Italy) Corrado Fontana	(Italy) Carlo Cassina	3
(Spain) Fiat Auto Eapaña	Abarth	Fiat Abarth Grande Punto S2000	(Spain) Miguel Fuster	(Spain) José Vincente Medina	7
(Switzerland) Scuderia Zero4 Piu	Abarth	Fiat Abarth Grande Punto S2000	(Switzerland) Olivier Burri	(France) Benjamin Veillas	9
(Czech Republic) Champion Racing	Peugeot	Peugeot 207 S2000	(Czech Republic) Jan Kopecký	(Czech Republic) Petr Starý	1–4
(Belgium) Peugeot Team Belux	Peugeot	Peugeot 207 S2000	(Belgium) Freddy Loix	(Belgium) Robin Buysmans	1–9
(Belgium) Peugeot Team Belux	Peugeot	Peugeot 207 S2000	(France) Nicolas Vouilloz	(France) Nicolas Klinger	1–9
(Belgium) Peugeot Team Belux	Peugeot	Peugeot 207 S2000	(Finland) Juho Hänninen	(Finland) Mikko Markkula	4
(France) BSA Team	Peugeot	Peugeot 207 S2000	(France) Brice Tirabassi	(France) Fabrice Gordon	1–5
(Italy) F.P.F. Sport SRL	Peugeot	Peugeot 207 S2000	(Italy) Luca Rossetti	(Italy) Matteo Chiarcossi	1–3, 5–6, 8–9
(Italy) F.P.F. Sport SRL	Peugeot	Peugeot 207 S2000	(Italy) Sandro Sottile	(Italy) Andrea Gorni	8
(Austria) Stohl Racing	Peugeot	Peugeot 207 S2000	(Austria) Manfred Stohl	(Austria) Ilka Minor	2
(France) Peugeot Total	Peugeot	Peugeot 207 S2000	(Portugal) Bruno Magalhães	(Portugal) Mário Castro	2
(France) Peugeot Total	Peugeot	Peugeot 207 S2000	(Portugal) Bruno Magalhães	(Portugal) Carlos Magalhães	5, 7
(France) BF Goodrich Drivers Team	Peugeot	Peugeot 207 S2000	(Portugal) Miguel Campos	(Portugal) Paulo Babo	2
(France) BF Goodrich Drivers Team	Peugeot	Peugeot 207 S2000	(Belgium) Patrick Snijers	(Belgium) Wim Soenens	3
(France) BF Goodrich Drivers Team	Peugeot	Peugeot 207 S2000	(Czech Republic) Pavel Valoušek	(Czech Republic) Zdeněk Hrůza	6
(France) BF Goodrich Drivers Team	Peugeot	Peugeot 207 S2000	(Spain) Sergio Vallejo	(Spain) Diego Vallejo	7
(France) BF Goodrich Drivers Team	Peugeot	Peugeot 207 S2000	(Italy) Andrea Torlasco	(Italy) Michele Brega	8
(Hungary) Peugeot Total Hungaria	Peugeot	Peugeot 207 S2000	(Hungary) János Tóth	(Hungary) Robert Tagai	2–3, 6, 9
(Poland) Cersanit Rally Team	Peugeot	Peugeot 207 S2000	(Poland) Michał Sołowow	(Poland) Maciek Baran	3, 5–6, 8
(Portugal) Team de Ralis Olca/Nacional da Madeira	Peugeot	Peugeot 207 S2000	(Portugal) Alexandre Camacho	(Portugal) Pedro Calado	5
(Czech Republic) Tescoma Rally Team	Peugeot	Peugeot 207 S2000	(Czech Republic) Roman Kresta	(Czech Republic) Petr Gross	6
(Spain) Peugeot Sport España	Peugeot	Peugeot 207 S2000	(Spain) Enrique García Ojeda	(Spain) Jordi Barrabés	6–7
(Spain) Peugeot Sport España	Peugeot	Peugeot 207 S2000	(Spain) Luís Monzón	(Spain) José Carlos Déniz	7
(Spain) Peugeot Sport España	Peugeot	Peugeot 207 S2000	(Spain) Óscar Garré	(Spain) Pablo Marcos	7
(Poland) Peugeot Sport Polska	Peugeot	Peugeot 207 S2000	(France) Bryan Bouffier	(France) Xavier Panseri	6, 9
(Switzerland) Lugano Racing Team	Peugeot	Peugeot 207 S2000	(Switzerland) Gregoire Hotz	(Switzerland) Pietro Ravasi	9
(Switzerland) Team Philippe Roux - Anne Spiers	Peugeot	Peugeot 207 S2000	(Switzerland) Florian Gonon	(Switzerland) Sandra Arlettaz	9
(Italy) Mauro Rally Tuning	Mitsubishi Ralliart	Mitsubishi Lancer Evo IX	(Italy) Giovanni Manfrinato	(Italy) Claudio Condotta	1
(Austria) Red Bull Rally Team	Mitsubishi Ralliart	Mitsubishi Lancer Evo IX	(Austria) Andreas Aigner	(Germany) Klaus Wicha	2
(Austria) Red Bull Rally Team	Mitsubishi Ralliart	Mitsubishi Lancer Evo IX	(Portugal) Bernardo Sousa	(Portugal) Carlos Magalhães	2
Ralliart Italy	Mitsubishi Ralliart	Mitsubishi Lancer Evo IX	(Portugal) Armindo Araújo	(Portugal) Miguel Ramalho	2
Ralliart Italy	Mitsubishi Ralliart	Mitsubishi Lancer Evo IX	(Italy) Paolo Andreucci	(Italy) Anna Andreussi	2, 8
(Finland) RRE Sports	Mitsubishi Ralliart	Mitsubishi Lancer Evo IX	(Finland) Juho Hänninen	(Finland) Mikko Markkula	2
(Netherlands) Heuvel Motorsport	Mitsubishi Ralliart	Mitsubishi Lancer Evo IX	(Netherlands) Jasper van den Heuvel	(Netherlands) Martine Kolman	3
(Russia) Driving Art	Mitsubishi Ralliart	Mitsubishi Lancer Evo IX	(Russia) Andrey Zhigunov	(Russia) Igor Ter-Oganesiants	4
(Czech Republic) EuroOil Čepro Czech National Team	Mitsubishi Ralliart	Mitsubishi Lancer Evo IX	(Czech Republic) Václav Pech	(Czech Republic) Petr Uhel	6
(Spain) B9 Racing	Mitsubishi Ralliart	Mitsubishi Lancer Evo IX	(Spain) Alberto Hevia	(Spain) Alberto Iglesias	7
(China) Guizhou Bailing Team	Mitsubishi Ralliart	Mitsubishi Lancer Evo IX	(China) Liu Chao Dong	(China) Hongyu Pan	10
(China) Guizhou Bailing Team	Mitsubishi Ralliart	Mitsubishi Lancer Evo IX	(China) Hongjie Wei	(China) Shaojun Huang	10
(China) Guizhou Bailing Team	Mitsubishi Ralliart	Mitsubishi Lancer Evo IX	(Finland) Juha Salo	(Finland) Mika Stenberg	10
(China) Soueast-Motor Wan Yu Rally Team	Mitsubishi Ralliart	Mitsubishi Lancer Evo IX	(Finland) Jarkko Miettinen	(Finland) Mikko Lukka	10
(China) Soueast-Motor Wan Yu Rally Team	Mitsubishi Ralliart	Mitsubishi Lancer Evo IX	(China) Fan Fan	(China) Junwei Fang	10
(China) Soueast-Motor Wan Yu Rally Team	Mitsubishi Ralliart	Mitsubishi Lancer Evo IX	(Thailand) Jixiang Wu	(Thailand) Zhengliang Ke	10
(China) Soueast-Motor Wan Yu Rally Team	Mitsubishi Ralliart	Mitsubishi Lancer Evo IX	(China) Zhonglin Yang	(China) Weipeng Zhang	10
(China) Wuyi Youth Rally Team	Mitsubishi Ralliart	Mitsubishi Lancer Evo IX	(China) Jun Xu	(China) Shuang Liu	10
(China) Wuyi Youth Rally Team	Mitsubishi Ralliart	Mitsubishi Lancer Evo IX	(China) Zhixing Yang	(China) Xin Guo	10
(Belgium) Duindistel	Volkswagen	Volkswagen Polo S2000	(Belgium) Bernd Casier	(Belgium) Frédéric Miclotte	3
(Belgium) Belgian VW Club	Volkswagen	Volkswagen Polo S2000	(Belgium) Bernd Casier	(Belgium) Frédéric Miclotte	6, 8
(Belgium) Belgian VW Club	Volkswagen	Volkswagen Polo S2000	(Belgium) Raphaël Auqueir	(Belgium) Cédric Pirotte	3
(Belgium) René Georges Rally Sport	Volkswagen	Volkswagen Polo S2000	(France) Philippe Greiffenberg	(France) Laurent Fourcade	9
(United Kingdom) Bill Gwynne Motorsport	MG	S2000 Sport	(United Kingdom) Mark Higgins	(United Kingdom) Rory Kennedy	3
(United Kingdom) Stuart Jones Rallying	MG	S2000 Sport	(United Kingdom) Stuart Jones	(United Kingdom) George Gwynn	9
(Italy) Procar	Honda	Honda Civic Type-R R3	(Italy) Alessandro Bettega	(Italy) Simone Scattolin	3, 6–9
(Italy) JAS Motorsport	Honda	Honda Civic Type-R R3	(United Kingdom) Guy Wilks	(Republic of Ireland) David Moynihan	4

== Drivers standings ==
- The best seven scores from each driver count towards the championship.

Pos	Driver	IST (Turkey)	POR (Portugal)	YPR (Belgium)	RUS (Russia)	MAD (Portugal)	ZLI (Czech Republic)	AST (Spain)	SAN (Italy)	VAL (Switzerland)	CHN (China)	Pts
1	(France) Nicolas Vouilloz	2	3	2	5	1	2	2	2	2		58
2	(Belgium) Freddy Loix	8	Ret	1	4	6	1	3	5	1		48
3	(Italy) Giandomenico Basso	Ret	4	6	3	2	Ret	1	1	5		46
4	(Italy) Luca Rossetti	1	1	3		5	7		3	3		44
5	(Finland) Anton Alén	3	Ret	11	2		Ret	6	8	6		21
6	(Italy) Renato Travaglia	4		Ret		4	5		4			19
7	(Czech Republic) Jan Kopecký	5	2	Ret	6							15
8	(Finland) Juho Hänninen		5		1							14
9	(France) Bryan Bouffier						3			4		11
10	(Finland) Jarkko Miettinen										1	10
11	(China) Liu Chao Dong										3	8
12	(Portugal) Alexandre Camacho					3						6
13	(China) Jun Xu										4	6
14	(Spain) Enrique García Ojeda						13	4				5
15	(Belgium) Bernd Casier			4								5
16	(Czech Republic) Pavel Valoušek						4					5
17	(China) Fan Fan										6	5
18	(Belgium) Patrick Snijers			5								4
19	(Spain) Miguel Fuster							5				4
20	(Hungary) János Tóth		Ret	Ret			6			8		4
21	(Portugal) Bruno Magalhães		6			8		Ret				4
22	(China) Hanping Ma										7	4
23	(Spain) Daniel Sola	6	Ret	Ret	Ret			Ret				3
24	(Italy) Alessandro Perico								6			3
25	(China) Zhuoyong Tan										8	3
26	(Turkey) Volkan Isik	7		Ret		11	16					2
27	(France) Brice Tirabassi	Ret	Ret	Ret	7	Ret						2
28	(Italy) Umberto Scandola					7			Ret	Ret		2
29	(Austria) Manfred Stohl		7									2
30	(Netherlands) Jasper van den Heuvel			7								2
31	(Spain) Sergio Vallejo							7				2
32	(Italy) Luca Cantamessa								7			2
33	(Switzerland) Gregoire Hotz									7		2
34	(Thailand) Jixiang Wu										9	2
35	(Austria) Andreas Aigner		8									1
36	(Czech Republic) Josef Peták						8					1
37	(Spain) Alberto Hevia							8				1
38	(Belgium) Paul Lietaer			9								1
39	(Russia) Oleg Antropov				9							1
40	(China) Jianrong Jan										11	1
Pos	Driver	IST (Turkey)	POR (Portugal)	YPR (Belgium)	RUS (Russia)	MAD (Portugal)	ZLI (Czech Republic)	AST (Spain)	SAN (Italy)	VAL (Switzerland)	CHN (China)	Pts

Key
Colour	Result
Gold	Winner
Silver	2nd place
Bronze	3rd place
Green	Points finish
Blue	Non-points finish
Blue	Non-classified finish (NC)
Purple	Did not finish (Ret)
Black	Excluded (EX)
Black	Disqualified (DSQ)
White	Did not start (DNS)
White	Cancelled (C)
Blank	Withdrew entry from the event (WD)
