= 2011 European Rally Championship =

Seasons
- ← 2010 2012 →

The 2011 European Rally Championship season was the 59th season of the FIA European Rally Championship, the European continental championship series in rallying. The season consisted of eleven rallies, beginning with Rally 1000 Miglia on 14 April 2011 and concluding with the Rallye International du Valais on 29 October 2011. Only drivers registered for the European championship were allowed to score points at the events, and they had to compete in a minimum of 8 rallies to be classified in the final championship standings. 28 drivers were registered for the season, the majority (15) were from Italy, four were from Poland, three from Bulgaria, two each from Slovenia and France and one each from Czech Republic and Switzerland.

As in the previous year, Italian driver Luca Rossetti won the European championship, driving an Abarth Grande Punto S2000 car. He won the European championship category in 5 rallies. Second place in the final standings was claimed by Luca Betti (Italy), who won 2 events. Polish driver Michał Sołowow was the ERC winner in 3 events, but did not compete in enough rallies to be classified in the final standings.

== Calendar ==
The original calendar for the 2011 season featured 12 rallies, the 11 rallies from the previous season plus Rally Bulgaria which returned after one year with the WRC. However, the first event, the ELPA Rally in Greece, was cancelled, leaving 11 rallies, 9 of them on tarmac. Two events were shared with the Intercontinental Rally Challenge: Ypres and Zlín.

Round	Date	Event	Surface	Other series
	1–3 April	(Greece) ELPA Rally	cancelled	
1	14–16 April	(Italy) Rally 1000 Miglia	tarmac	Italian
2	20–22 May	Croatia Rally	tarmac	Croatian
3	3–5 June	(Turkey) Bosphorus Rally	gravel	Turkish
4	23–25 June	(Belgium) Ypres Rally	tarmac	IRC, Belgian
5	8–10 July	Rally Bulgaria	tarmac	Bulgarian
6	4–6 August	(Portugal) Rally Vinho da Madeira	tarmac	Portuguese, Madeiran
7	16–18 August	(Czech Republic) Barum Rally Zlín	tarmac	IRC, Czech
8	9–11 September	(Spain) Rally Príncipe de Asturias	tarmac	Spain
9	23–25 September	Rally Poland	gravel	Polish
10	14–16 October	(France) Rallye d'Antibes Côte d'Azur	tarmac	French
11	27–29 October	(Switzerland) Rallye International du Valais	tarmac	Swiss

== Results and standings ==
=== Results and statistics ===
Note: the results and statistics only consider drivers starting in the ERC.

Colour	Rally Surface
Gold	Gravel
Silver	Tarmac

Round	Rally name	ERC Podium finishers				ERC Statistics			
Round	Rally name	Rank	Driver	Car	Time	Stages	Length	Starters	Finishers
1	(Italy) Rally 1000 Miglia (14–16 April); Result source:	1	(Italy) Luca Rossetti	Abarth Grande Punto S2000	2:57:17.3	14	247.43 km	17	11
1	(Italy) Rally 1000 Miglia (14–16 April); Result source:	2	(Italy) Renato Travaglia	Škoda Fabia S2000	+1:17.3	14	247.43 km	17	11
1	(Italy) Rally 1000 Miglia (14–16 April); Result source:	3	(Italy) Alessandro Perico	Peugeot 207 S2000	+1:39.8	14	247.43 km	17	11
2	Croatia Rally (20–22 May); Result source:	1	(Italy) Luca Rossetti	Abarth Grande Punto S2000	2:21:09.1	15	246.45 km	13	10
2	Croatia Rally (20–22 May); Result source:	2	(Italy) Luca Betti	Peugeot 207 S2000	+1:41.1	15	246.45 km	13	10
2	Croatia Rally (20–22 May); Result source:	3	(Poland) Maciej Oleksowicz	Ford Fiesta S2000	+2:51.9	15	246.45 km	13	10
3	(Turkey) Bosphorus Rally (3–5 June); Result source:	1	(Italy) Luca Betti	Peugeot 207 S2000	2:28:14.7	16	238.30 km	7	5
3	(Turkey) Bosphorus Rally (3–5 June); Result source:	2	(Poland) Maciej Oleksowicz	Ford Fiesta S2000	+34.9	16	238.30 km	7	5
3	(Turkey) Bosphorus Rally (3–5 June); Result source:	3	(Poland) Szymon Ruta	Peugeot 207 S2000	+4:42.6	16	238.30 km	7	5
4	(Belgium) Ypres Rally (24–25 June) — Results and report Result source:	1	(Poland) Michał Sołowow	Ford Fiesta S2000	2:46:10.7	18	297.10 km	7	4
4	(Belgium) Ypres Rally (24–25 June) — Results and report Result source:	2	(Italy) Luca Rossetti	Abarth Grande Punto S2000	+1:18.2	18	297.10 km	7	4
4	(Belgium) Ypres Rally (24–25 June) — Results and report Result source:	3	(Czech Republic) Antonín Tlusťák	Škoda Fabia S2000	+5:22.1	18	297.10 km	7	4
5	Rally Bulgaria (8–10 July); Result source:	1	(Italy) Luca Rossetti	Abarth Grande Punto S2000	2:28:35.9	10	257.76 km	10	10
5	Rally Bulgaria (8–10 July); Result source:	2	(Bulgaria) Petar Gyoshev	Peugeot 207 S2000	+7.3	10	257.76 km	10	10
5	Rally Bulgaria (8–10 July); Result source:	3	(Italy) Luca Betti	Peugeot 207 S2000	+34.8	10	257.76 km	10	10
6	(Portugal) Rali Vinho da Madeira (4–6 August); Result source:	1	(Italy) Luca Rossetti	Abarth Grande Punto S2000	2:54:40.4	19	268.50 km	7	6
6	(Portugal) Rali Vinho da Madeira (4–6 August); Result source:	2	(Italy) Luca Betti	Peugeot 207 S2000	+4:00.3	19	268.50 km	7	6
6	(Portugal) Rali Vinho da Madeira (4–6 August); Result source:	3	(Czech Republic) Antonín Tlusťák	Škoda Fabia S2000	+7:08.0	19	268.50 km	7	6
7	(Czech Republic) Barum Rally Zlín (16–18 August); Result source:	1	(Poland) Michał Sołowow	Ford Fiesta S2000	2:20:52.4	15	248.48 km	9	8
7	(Czech Republic) Barum Rally Zlín (16–18 August); Result source:	2	(Italy) Giandomenico Basso	Proton Satria Neo S2000	+52.1	15	248.48 km	9	8
7	(Czech Republic) Barum Rally Zlín (16–18 August); Result source:	3	(Poland) Maciej Oleksowicz	Ford Fiesta S2000	+2:09.0	15	248.48 km	9	8
8	(Spain) Rally Príncipe de Asturias (9–11 September); Result source:	1	(Italy) Luca Betti	Peugeot 207 S2000	2:31:15.1	13	231,56 km	6	4
8	(Spain) Rally Príncipe de Asturias (9–11 September); Result source:	2	(Czech Republic) Antonín Tlusťák	Škoda Fabia S2000	+3:30.7	13	231,56 km	6	4
8	(Spain) Rally Príncipe de Asturias (9–11 September); Result source:	3	(Poland) Szymon Ruta	Peugeot 207 S2000	+3:34.5	13	231,56 km	6	4
9	Rally Poland (23–25 September); Result source:	1	(Poland) Michał Sołowow	Ford Fiesta S2000	2:09:17.9	13	230.23 km	7	7
9	Rally Poland (23–25 September); Result source:	2	(Italy) Luca Rossetti	Abarth Grande Punto S2000	+4:17.6	13	230.23 km	7	7
9	Rally Poland (23–25 September); Result source:	3	(Poland) Szymon Ruta	Peugeot 207 S2000	+4:44.8	13	230.23 km	7	7
10	(France) Rallye d'Antibes Côte d'Azur (14–16 October); Result source:	1	(Italy) Luca Rossetti	Abarth Grande Punto S2000	2:56:38.1	14	259.91 km	8	6
10	(France) Rallye d'Antibes Côte d'Azur (14–16 October); Result source:	2	(Italy) Luca Betti	Peugeot 207 S2000	+23.6	14	259.91 km	8	6
10	(France) Rallye d'Antibes Côte d'Azur (14–16 October); Result source:	3	(Poland) Maciej Oleksowicz	Ford Fiesta S2000	+6:23.0	14	259.91 km	8	6
11	(Switzerland) Rallye International du Valais (27–29 October); Result source:	1	(Czech Republic) Antonín Tlusťák	Škoda Fabia S2000	3:12:48.4	17	264.71 km	6	4
11	(Switzerland) Rallye International du Valais (27–29 October); Result source:	2	(Poland) Maciej Oleksowicz	Ford Fiesta S2000	+10:28.2	17	264.71 km	6	4
11	(Switzerland) Rallye International du Valais (27–29 October); Result source:	3	(Slovenia) Rok Turk	Peugeot 207 R3T	+14:07.4	17	264.71 km	6	4

=== Drivers' championship ===
For the final classification in a rally, the winner got 25 points, the runner-up 18 and the third placed driver 15. Drivers ranked 4 to 10 got 12–10–8–6–4–2–1 point(s). Additionally, the top five of every leg got 7–5–3–2–1 point(s). The season was divided into two parts (first 5 and last 6 rallies). From each part, only the 4 best results for each driver counted towards the championship. To qualify for the final standings, a driver had to participate in at least 5 events and in at least 1 in each part of the season.

Pos	Driver	ITA (Italy)	CRO (Croatia)	TUR (Turkey)	BEL (Belgium)	BUL (Bulgaria)	POR (Portugal)	CZE (Czech Republic)	ESP (Spain)	POL (Poland)	FRA (France)	SUI (Switzerland)	Pts
1	(Italy) Luca Rossetti	1	1		2	1	1			2	1	Ret	253
2	(Italy) Luca Betti	4	2	1	Ret	3	2	5	1		2	Ret	223
3	(Czech Republic) Antonín Tlusťák	9	6	4	3	5	3	4	2	4	4	1	164
4	(Poland) Maciej Oleksowicz	7	3	2	4		Ret	3	Ret	Ret	3	2	163
5	(Poland) Szymon Ruta		5	3		7	4		3	3	Ret		101
6	(Slovenia) Rok Turk	10	8			9	5	8			5	3	59
7	(Italy) Giovanni Vergnano	Ret	10	Ret		10	6		4	Ret	6	4	51
Not enough events to qualify for championship
	(Poland) Michał Sołowow				1			1		1			(115)
	(Bulgaria) Dimitar Iliev	5	4			4							(46)
	(Italy) Renato Travaglia	2	Ret	Ret									(35)
	(Italy) Giandomenico Basso				Ret			2					(31)
	(Bulgaria) Petar Gyoshev	Ret				2							(28)
	(Poland) Maciej Rzeźnik		7			6			Ret	Ret			(23)
	(Italy) Alessandro Perico	3											(21)
	(Italy) Stefano Albertini	6			Ret			6					(18)
	(Bulgaria) Todor Slavov			5		8		Ret					(17)
	(Italy) Piero Longhi	Ret	Ret										(7)
	(Italy) Marco Cavigioli							7					(6)
	(Italy) Marco Signor	8											(4)
	(Italy) Elia Bossalini	Ret	9										(2)
	(France) Cyril Vosahlo										Ret		(1)

Key
Colour	Result
Gold	Winner
Silver	2nd place
Bronze	3rd place
Green	Points finish
Blue	Non-points finish
Blue	Non-classified finish (NC)
Purple	Did not finish (Ret)
Black	Excluded (EX)
Black	Disqualified (DSQ)
White	Did not start (DNS)
White	Cancelled (C)
Blank	Withdrew entry from the event (WD)

=== 2WD drivers' championship ===
Any driver participating in a 2WD car automatically also scored points for the 2WD championship.

Pos	Driver	ITA (Italy)	CRO (Croatia)	TUR (Turkey)	BEL (Belgium)	BUL (Bulgaria)	POR (Portugal)	CZE (Czech Republic)	ESP (Spain)	POL (Poland)	FRA (France)	SUI (Switzerland)	Pts
1	(Slovenia) Rok Turk	3	1			2	1	2			1	1	231
2	(Italy) Giovanni Vergnano	Ret	2	Ret		3	2		1	Ret	2	2	186
Not enough events to qualify for championship
	(Bulgaria) Todor Slavov			1		1		Ret					(85)
	(Italy) Stefano Albertini	1			Ret			1					(78)
	(Italy) Marco Signor	2											(28)
	(Italy) Andrea Dallavilla	Ret											(2)
