= 2012 European Rally Championship =

Seasons
- ← 2011 2013 →

The 2012 European Rally Championship season was the 60th season of the FIA European Rally Championship, the European continental championship series in rallying. The season consisted of eleven (twelve planned) rallies, beginning with the Internationale Jänner Rallye in Austria on 5 January 2012 and concluding with the Rallye International du Valais on 27 October 2012. After 8 rounds, Finnish driver Juho Hänninen secured the championship, winning four events.

== Calendar ==
The calendar for the 2012 season featured twelve rallies, the eleven rallies from the previous season plus the Internationale Jänner Rallye in Austria. Two events were shared with the Intercontinental Rally Challenge: Ypres and Zlín. However one event, the Rallye d'Antibes Côte d'Azur, withdrew from the ERC during the season.

Round	Date	Event	Surface	Distance	Winner	Time	Avg. Speed
1	5 – 7 January	(Austria) Internationale Jänner Rallye	wintery tarmac	237.58 km	(Czech Republic) Jan Kopecký	2:54:20.4	81.8 km/h
2	19 – 21 April	(Italy) Rally 1000 Miglia	tarmac	256.63 km	(Italy) Giandomenico Basso	3:00:28.2	85.3 km/h
3	24 – 26 May	Croatia Rally	tarmac	240.74 km	(Finland) Juho Hänninen	2:17:21.8	105.2 km/h
4	8 – 10 June	Rally Bulgaria	tarmac	250.22 km	(Bulgaria) Dimitar Iliev	2:20:26.5	106.9 km/h
5	21 – 24 June	(Belgium) Ypres Rally	tarmac	287.50 km	(Finland) Juho Hänninen	2:36:52.7	110.0 km/h
6	6 – 8 July	(Turkey) Bosphorus Rally	gravel	238.66 km	(Finland) Juho Hänninen	2:29:50.8	94.9 km/h
7	26 – 28 July	(Portugal) Rally Vinho da Madeira	tarmac	250.06 km	(Portugal) Bruno Magalhães	2:39:41.8	94.0 km/h
8	31 Aug. – 2 Sep.	(Czech Republic) Barum Rally Zlín	tarmac	251.62 km	(Finland) Juho Hänninen	2:11:28.2	104.2 km/h
9	13 – 15 September	(Spain) Rally Príncipe de Asturias	tarmac	235.56 km	(Andorra) Joan Vinyes	1:38:44.7	89.4 km/h
10	28 – 30 September	Rally Poland	gravel	233.40 km	(Finland) Esapekka Lappi	2:06:03.1	111.1 km/h
	12 – 14 October	(France) Rallye d'Antibes Côte d'Azur	withdrew from ERC				
11	25 – 27 October	(Switzerland) Rallye International du Valais	tarmac	293.36 km	(Switzerland) Laurent Reuche	3:12:10.1	85.2 km/h

== Championship standings ==
=== Drivers' championship ===
For the final classification in a rally, the winner got 25 points, the runner-up 18 and the third placed driver 15. Drivers ranked 4 to 10 got 12–10–8–6–4–2–1 point(s). Additionally, the top five of every leg got 7–5–3–2–1 point(s). Drivers had to start in a minimum of 4 events in order to qualify for the final standings and at least one event in either half of the season. Only the 4 best results from both half-seasons counted towards the final standings.

Note: The "4+4" column lists the 4 best results from both halves of the season, and only if the driver competed in at least one event in each half. The "all" column lists the total number of points, but only if they differ from the other column.

Pos	Driver	AUT (Austria)	ITA (Italy)	CRO (Croatia)	BUL (Bulgaria)	BEL (Belgium)	TUR (Turkey)	POR (Portugal)	CZE (Czech Republic)	ESP (Spain)	POL (Poland)	SUI (Switzerland)	Points	
Pos	Driver	AUT (Austria)	ITA (Italy)	CRO (Croatia)	BUL (Bulgaria)	BEL (Belgium)	TUR (Turkey)	POR (Portugal)	CZE (Czech Republic)	ESP (Spain)	POL (Poland)	SUI (Switzerland)	4+4	all
1	(Finland) Juho Hänninen	2	4	1		1	1	7	1				203	(220)
2	(Poland) Michał Sołowow	7	14	4		5	5		9	2	2		103	
3	(Italy) Luca Betti	18	7	3	EX			Ret					32	
4	(Czech Republic) Antonín Tlusťák	12		Ret	5	10	7		Ret	Ret		8	25	
5	(Switzerland) Francisco Parli		Ret	6	7					6			23	
6	(Bulgaria) Ekaterina Stratieva			14	8	42			Ret				4	
7	(Czech Republic) Jan Černý	25	10						23		12		1	
Not enough events for final standings (podium finishers)
	(Czech Republic) Jan Kopecký	1							Ret				–	(40)
	(Italy) Giandomenico Basso		1										–	(39)
	(Portugal) Bruno Magalhães							1					–	(39)
	(Finland) Esapekka Lappi										1		–	(39)
	(Switzerland) Laurent Reuche											1	–	(39)
	(Belgium) Pieter Tsjoen					3						4	–	(39)
	(Bulgaria) Dimitar Iliev		Ret	Ret	1								–	(37)
	(Andorra) Joan Vinyes									1			–	(37)
	(Switzerland) Florian Gonon											2	–	(34)
	(Germany) Hermann Gassner, Jr.			2									–	(33)
	(Bulgaria) Petar Gyoshev		9		2								–	(32)
	(Turkey) Yağiz Avci						2						–	(30)
	(Belgium) Freddy Loix					2							–	(28)
	(Italy) Luca Rossetti						3						–	(28)
	(Portugal) Vítor Sá							2					–	(28)
	(Italy) Paolo Andreucci		2										–	(26)
	(Switzerland) Nicola Althaus											3	–	(25)
	(Czech Republic) Roman Kresta								2				–	(22)
	(Italy) Umberto Scandola		3										–	(22)
	(Bulgaria) Krum Donchev				3								–	(21)
	(Spain) Surhayen Pernía									3			–	(21)
	(Czech Republic) Tomáš Kostka								3				–	(19)
	(Poland) Grzegorz Grzyb										3		–	(19)
	(Austria) Beppo Harrach	3											–	(18)
	(Portugal) João Magalhães							3					–	(18)
