= 2009 European Rally Championship =

Seasons
- ← 2008 2010 →

The 2009 European Rally Championship season was the 57th season of the FIA European Rally Championship. The season had 11 rallies, of which Giandomenico Basso won 7 and thus claimed his second European rally championship title.

== Calendar and winners ==
For the 2009 season, the number of rounds was increased from 9 to 11. The calendar featured 3 new rallies (in Spain, Greece and Switzerland), whereas Rally Poland was a round of the World Rally Championship in that year.

Round	Date	Event	Winner ERC
1	17–19 April	(Italy) Rally 1000 Miglia	(Italy) Giandomenico Basso
2	1– 3 May	(Turkey) Istanbul Rally	(Poland) Michał Sołowow
3	28–30 May	Croatia Rally	(Bulgaria) Krum Donchev
4	18–20 June	(Belgium) Ypres Rally	(Italy) Giandomenico Basso
5	17–19 July	Rally Bulgaria	(Italy) Giandomenico Basso
6	30 July–1 August	(Portugal) Rally Vinho da Madeira	(Italy) Giandomenico Basso
7	20–22 August	(Czech Republic) Barum Rally Zlín	(Poland) Michał Sołowow
8	10–12 September	(Spain) Rallye Príncipe de Asturias	(Italy) Corrado Fontana
9	25–27 September	(Greece) ELPA Rally	(Italy) Giandomenico Basso
10	16–18 October	(France) Rallye d'Antibes Côte d'Azur	(Italy) Giandomenico Basso
11	30 October– 1 November	(Switzerland) Rallye International du Valais	(Italy) Giandomenico Basso

== Championship standings ==
For the final classification in a rally, the winner was awarded 10 points, the runner-up 8 and the third placed driver 6. Drivers ranked 4 to 8 got 5–4–3–2–1 point(s). Additionally, the top three of every leg got 3–2–1 point(s). Only drivers who participated in least 6 events qualified for the championship ranking.

Pos.	Driver	(Italy)	(Turkey)	(Croatia)	(Belgium)	(Bulgaria)	(Portugal)	(Czech Republic)	(Spain)	(Greece)	(France)	(Switzerland)	Points
1	(Italy) Giandomenico Basso	1			1	1	1	Ret	3	1	1	1	122
2	(Poland) Michał Sołowow	3	1	2	4	5	3	1	2	Ret	2	2	103
3	(Italy) Corrado Fontana	5	3	4	3	3	2	Ret	1	2	Ret		78
4	(Italy) Luca Betti	4	Ret	3	2	Ret					Ret		34
5	(Czech Republic) Antonín Tlusťák	10		8	6	7	Ret	4	4	4			22
6	(Czech Republic) Jan Černý	11		10		10		2		Ret	3		16
7	(Bulgaria) Todor Slavov	9	Ret	7		8		5	Ret	3			14
8	(Italy) Marco Cavigioli			9		9	Ret	3			Ret	Ret	6
Not enough events to qualify for championship
	(Bulgaria) Krum Donchev	6	2	1	5	2							(43)
	(Italy) Renato Travaglia	2											(13)
	(Italy) Davide di Benedetto	8		5		6							(8)

Key
Colour	Result
Gold	Winner
Silver	2nd place
Bronze	3rd place
Green	Points finish
Blue	Non-points finish
Blue	Non-classified finish (NC)
Purple	Did not finish (Ret)
Black	Excluded (EX)
Black	Disqualified (DSQ)
White	Did not start (DNS)
White	Cancelled (C)
Blank	Withdrew entry from the event (WD)
