= 2008 European Rally Championship =

Seasons
- ← 2007 2009 →

The 2008 European Rally Championship season was the 56th season of the FIA European Rally Championship. Italian driver Luca Rossetti won 4 of the 9 rallies to claim his first European rally championship title.

== Calendar and winners ==
The calendar of the 2008 season consisted of only 9 events, after the ELPA Rally not taking place in that year. The remaining events were unchanged from the previous year.

Round	Date	Event	Winner ERC
1	4– 6 April	(Turkey) Istanbul Rally	(Italy) Luca Rossetti
2	18–20 April	(Italy) Rally 1000 Miglia	(Italy) Luca Rossetti
3	22–24 May	Croatia Delta Rally	(Italy) Luca Rossetti
4	6– 8 June	Rally Poland	(Poland) Michał Sołowow
5	27–28 June	(Belgium) Ypres Rally	(Italy) Luca Rossetti
6	11–13 July	Rally Bulgaria	(Bulgaria) Krum Donchev
7	1–2 August	(Portugal) Rally Vinho da Madeira	(Italy) Giandomenico Basso
8	22–24 August	(Czech Republic) Barum Rally Zlín	(Italy) Renato Travaglia
9	17–19 October	(France) Rallye Antibes Côte d'Azur	(Poland) Michał Sołowow

== Championship standings ==
For the final classification in a rally, the winner was awarded 10 points, the runner-up 8 and the third placed driver 6. Drivers ranked 4 to 8 got 5–4–3–2–1 point(s). Additionally, the top three of every leg got 3–2–1 point(s). Only drivers who participated in least 6 events qualified for the championship ranking.

Pos.	Driver	(Turkey)	(Italy)	(Croatia)	(Poland)	(Belgium)	(Bulgaria)	(Portugal)	(Czech Republic)	(France)	Points
1	(Italy) Luca Rossetti	1	1			1		3	2	Ret	67
2	(Poland) Michał Sołowow	Ret	Ret	2	1	Ret	3	4	3	1	65
3	(Turkey) Volkan Isik	5	Ret	3	3	Ret	2	5	5	2	54
4	(Italy) Corrado Fontana		4	1	Ret	Ret	4			3	34
5	(Bulgaria) Krum Donchev	6	6	4	6		1		Ret	Ret	30
6	(Italy) Luca Betti	Ret	7	5	4	4	5	6	4	Ret	29
7	(Czech Republic) Antonín Tlusťák		8	Ret		5	Ret		6	4	13
Not enough events to qualify for championship
	(Italy) Renato Travaglia	3	2			Ret		2	1		(50)
	(Italy) Giandomenico Basso	Ret	Ret			2		1	Ret		(32)
	(Finland) Anton Alén	2				3			Ret		(22)
	(Poland) Tomasz Czopik		Ret		2						(12)

Key
Colour	Result
Gold	Winner
Silver	2nd place
Bronze	3rd place
Green	Points finish
Blue	Non-points finish
Blue	Non-classified finish (NC)
Purple	Did not finish (Ret)
Black	Excluded (EX)
Black	Disqualified (DSQ)
White	Did not start (DNS)
White	Cancelled (C)
Blank	Withdrew entry from the event (WD)
