= Anton Alén =

Finnish rally driver

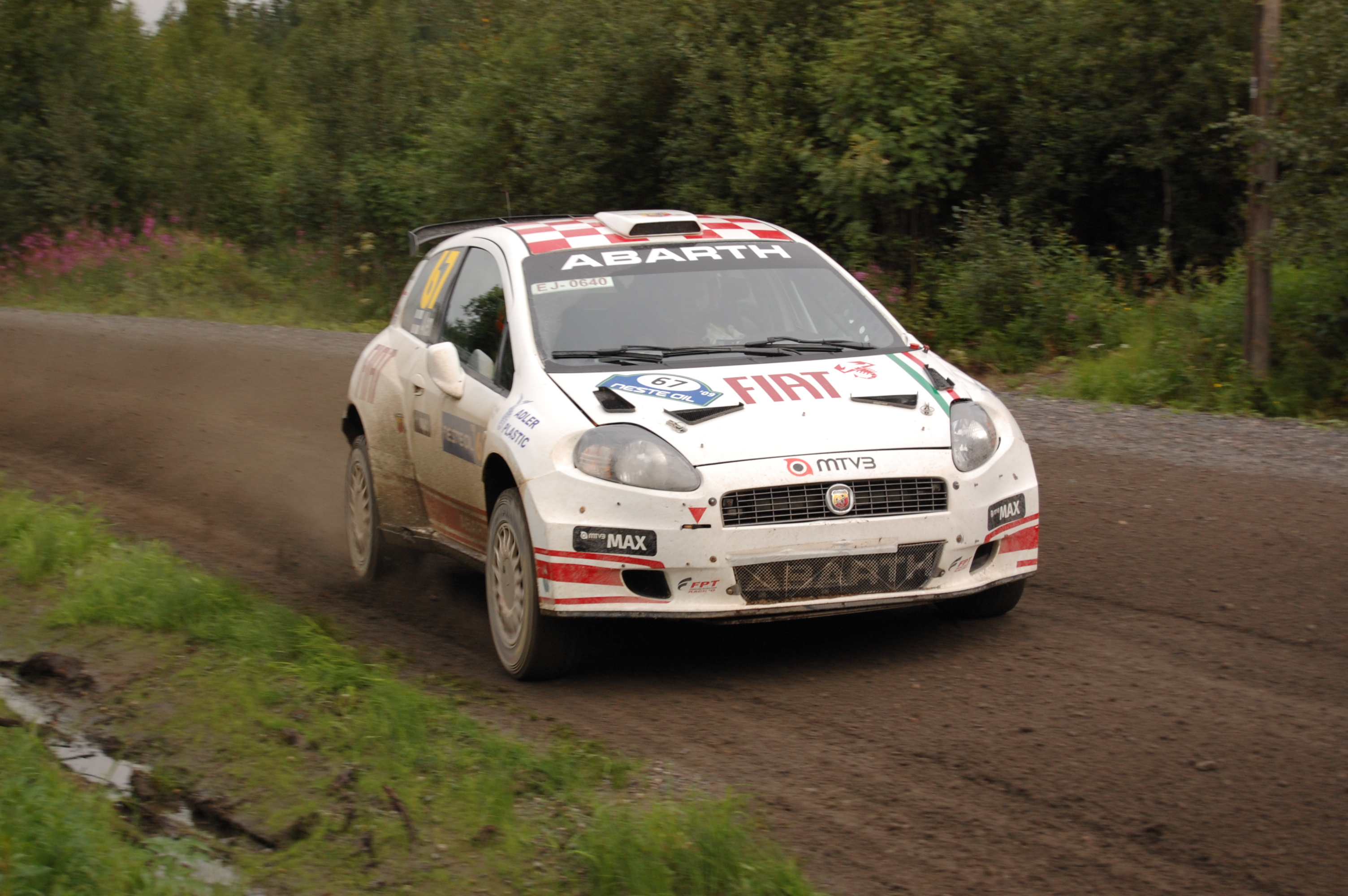
- Anton Alen racing in 2009 Rally Finland

Personal information
- Nationality: (Finland) Finnish
- Born: 3 June 1983 (age 43)

World Rally Championship record
- Years active: 2005–2007, 2009
- Co-driver: (Finland) Jussi Aariainen (Finland) Timo Hantunen (Finland) Timo Alanne
- Teams: Abarth
- Rallies: 7
- Championships: 0
- Rally wins: 0
- Podiums: 0
- Stage wins: 0
- Total points: 0
- First rally: 2005 Rally Finland
- Last rally: 2009 Rally Finland

Anton Alén (born 3 June 1983) is a Finnish rally driver, who competed in World Rally Championship and Intercontinental Rally Challenge during his career. He was a factory driver for Fiat Abarth from 2007 to 2009. He scored one IRC victory, at 2007 Rally Russia. Hís father Markku Alén became one-time World Rally Champion in 1978 with the legendary Fiat 131 Abarth.

== Career results ==
=== WRC results ===
Year	Entrant	Car	1	2	3	4	5	6	7	8	9	10	11	12	13	14	15	16	WDC	Points
2005	Anton Alén	Mitsubishi Lancer Evo VII	MON	SWE	MEX	NZL	ITA	CYP	TUR	GRE	ARG	FIN; 33	GER	GBR	JPN	FRA	ESP	AUS	NC	0
2006	Anton Alén	Subaru Impreza STi	MON	SWE	MEX	ESP	FRA	ARG	ITA; Ret	GRE	GER	FIN; 11	JPN	CYP	TUR	AUS	NZL	GBR; 13	NC	0
2007	Anton Alén	Subaru Impreza STi	MON	SWE; 17	NOR	MEX	POR	ARG	ITA	GRE									NC	0
2007	Abarth & Co. SpA	Fiat Abarth Grande Punto S2000									FIN; Ret	GER	NZL	ESP	FRA	JPN	IRE	GBR	NC	0
2009	Abarth & Co. SpA	Fiat Abarth Grande Punto S2000	IRE	NOR	CYP	POR	ARG	ITA	GRE	POL	FIN; 12	AUS	ESP	GBR					NC	0

=== IRC results ===
Year	Entrant	Car	1	2	3	4	5	6	7	8	9	10	11	12	WDC	Points
2007	(Italy) Abarth & Co. SpA	Fiat Abarth Grande Punto S2000	KEN	TUR; 4	BEL	RUS; 1	POR	CZE; Ret	ITA	SWI	CHI				7th	15
2008	(Italy) Abarth & Co. SpA	Fiat Abarth Grande Punto S2000	TUR; 3	POR; Ret	BEL; 11	RUS; 2	POR	CZE; Ret	ESP; 6	ITA; 8	SWI; 6	CHI			5th	21
2009	(Italy) Abarth & Co. SpA	Fiat Abarth Grande Punto S2000	MON; Ret	BRA; Ret	KEN	POR; 14	BEL	RUS; 7	POR	CZE	ESP	ITA	SCO		34th	3
