= 2010 European Rally Championship =

Seasons
- ← 2009 2011 →

The 2010 European Rally Championship season was the 58th season of the FIA European Rally Championship. The season had 11 rallies, beginning with Rally 1000 Miglia on 22 April. The championship was contested by 24 drivers from 6 countries. Luca Rossetti won 4 events and claimed his second European rally championship title.

== Calendar and winners ==
As in the previous year, the calendar consisted of 11 rounds. Rally Bulgaria was a World Rally Championship event in 2010, but Rally Poland was back in the ERC calendar. The other 10 rounds remained the same, although in a slightly different order.

Round	Date	Event	Winner ERC
1	22–24 April	(Italy) Rally 1000 Miglia	(Italy) Luca Rossetti
2	14–16 May	Croatia Rally	(Italy) Luca Rossetti
3	4–6 June	Rally Poland	(Poland) Kajetan Kajetanowicz
4	24–26 June	(Belgium) Ypres Rally	(Czech Republic) Jan Kopecký
5	23–25 July	(Turkey) Bosphorus Rally	(Italy) Luca Rossetti
6	5–7 August	(Portugal) Rally Vinho da Madeira	(Czech Republic) Jan Kopecký
7	27–29 August	(Czech Republic) Barum Rally Zlín	(France) Bryan Bouffier
8	9–11 September	(Spain) Rallye Principe de Asturias	(Italy) Luigi Fontana
9	1–3 October	(Greece) ELPA Rally	(Ukraine) Yuriy Protasov
10	15–17 October	(France) Rallye Antibes Côte d'Azur	(Italy) Luca Betti
11	28–30 October	(Switzerland) Rallye International du Valais	(Italy) Luca Rossetti

== Championship standings ==
For the final classification in a rally, the winner got 25 points, the runner-up 18 and the third placed driver 15. Drivers ranked 4 to 10 got 12–10–8–6–4–2–1 point(s). Additionally, the top five of every leg were awarded 7–5–3–2–1 point(s). Only drivers who participated in least 5 events qualified for the championship ranking.

Pos.	Driver	(Italy)	(Croatia)	(Poland)	(Belgium)	(Turkey)	(Portugal)	(Czech Republic)	(Spain)	(Greece)	(France)	(Switzerland)	Points
1	(Italy) Luca Rossetti	1	1	3		1	Ret					1	195
2	(Czech Republic) Antonín Tlusťák	10	5		Ret			2	2	2	3	3	140
3	(Poland) Michał Sołowow			2	2					Ret	2	Ret	112
4	(Italy) Luca Betti	6	2	Ret	3	Ret					1	Ret	102
5	(Poland) Maciej Oleksowicz	11	4	4	5	Ret		5		Ret	4		91
6	(Italy) Corrado Fontana	7	3	Ret	4	Ret	2	Ret	Ret				78
7	(Poland) Szymon Ruta			Ret		2				4	5	Ret	60
8	(Ukraine) Yuriy Protasov	13	Ret	Ret	Ret	Ret		Ret		1	6		51
9	(Czech Republic) Jan Černý	12	7		Ret			4		3		Ret	39
Not enough events to qualify for championship
	(Czech Republic) Jan Kopecký	8			1		1	Ret					(82)
	(Italy) Luigi Fontana	Ret	6				3		1				(66)
	(Poland) Kajetan Kajetanowicz			1	Ret								(37)
	(France) Bryan Bouffier			Ret				1					(37)
	(Italy) Matteo Gamba	9						Ret				2	(32)

Key
Colour	Result
Gold	Winner
Silver	2nd place
Bronze	3rd place
Green	Points finish
Blue	Non-points finish
Blue	Non-classified finish (NC)
Purple	Did not finish (Ret)
Black	Excluded (EX)
Black	Disqualified (DSQ)
White	Did not start (DNS)
White	Cancelled (C)
Blank	Withdrew entry from the event (WD)
