= 2007 Intercontinental Rally Challenge =

Seasons
- ← 2006 2008 →

The 2007 Intercontinental Rally Challenge was the second season of the Intercontinental Rally Challenge. The season consisted of nine rounds and began on March 9, with the Safari Rally. The season ended on November 11 with the China Rally. Enrique García Ojeda won the title ahead of Nicolas Vouilloz and Andrea Navarra.

== Calendar ==
Rd.	Start date	Finish date	Rally	Rally headquarters	Surface	Stages	Distance
1	9 March	11 March	(Kenya) 55th KCB Safari Rally	Nairobi	Gravel	19	294.28 km
2	11 May	13 May	36th Fiat Rally of Turkey	Pendik, Istanbul	Gravel	19	249.85 km
3	22 June	24 June	43rd Belgium Ypres Westhoek Rally	Ypres, West Flanders	Asphalt	18	288.82 km
4	12 July	14 July	1st Rally Russia	Vyborg, Leningrad	Gravel	11	152.03 km
5	2 August	4 August	(Portugal) 48th Rali Vinho da Madeira	Funchal, Madeira	Asphalt	19	285.68 km
6	24 August	26 August	(Czech Republic) 37th Barum Rally Zlín	Zlín, Zlín Region	Asphalt	15	262.34 km
7	27 September	29 September	(Italy) 49th Rallye Sanremo	Sanremo, Liguria	Asphalt	10	217.48 km
8	25 October	27 October	(Switzerland) 48th Rallye International du Valais	Martigny, Valais	Asphalt	17	261.38 km
9	9 November	11 November	10th Rally China Longyou	Longyou, Quzhou	Gravel	16	223.37 km

== Selected entries ==
Entrant	Constructor	Car	Driver	Co-driver	Rounds
(Italy) Abarth & Co. Spa	Abarth	Fiat Abarth Grande Punto S2000	(Italy) Andrea Navarra	(Italy) Guido D'Amore	1–4
(Italy) Abarth & Co. Spa	Abarth	Fiat Abarth Grande Punto S2000	(Italy) Andrea Navarra	(Italy) Dario D'Esposito	5–8
(Italy) Abarth & Co. Spa	Abarth	Fiat Abarth Grande Punto S2000	(Italy) Umberto Scandola	(Italy) Luigi Pirollo	1, 3
(Italy) Abarth & Co. Spa	Abarth	Fiat Abarth Grande Punto S2000	(Italy) Umberto Scandola	(Italy) Guido D'Amore	7–8
(Italy) Abarth & Co. Spa	Abarth	Fiat Abarth Grande Punto S2000	(Finland) Anton Alén	(Finland) Timo Alanne	2, 4, 6
(Italy) Abarth & Co. Spa	Abarth	Fiat Abarth Grande Punto S2000	(Italy) Giandomenico Basso	(Italy) Mitia Dotta	5, 7
Fiat Motorsport Turkey	Abarth	Fiat Abarth Grande Punto S2000	(Turkey) Volkan Isik	(Turkey) Kaan Özşenler	2–3, 5–6
(Italy) H.F. Grifone SRL	Abarth	Fiat Abarth Grande Punto S2000	(Italy) Corrado Fontana	(Italy) Renzo Casazza	3, 5–6
(Poland) Cersanit Rally Team	Abarth	Fiat Abarth Grande Punto S2000	(Poland) Michał Sołowow	(Poland) Maciek Baran	3, 6
(Belgium) Duindistel	Abarth	Fiat Abarth Grande Punto S2000	(Belgium) Pieter Tsjoen	(Belgium) Eddy Chevaillier	3
(Belgium) Duindistel	Abarth	Fiat Abarth Grande Punto S2000	(Belgium) Freddy Loix	(Belgium) Eddy Chevaillier	5–8
(Portugal) Fiat Vodafone	Abarth	Fiat Abarth Grande Punto S2000	(Portugal) José Pedro Fontes	(Portugal) Fernando Prata	5
(Italy) Island Motorsport	Abarth	Fiat Abarth Grande Punto S2000	(Italy) Renato Travaglia	(Italy) Lorenzo Granai	6–7
(Switzerland) Scuderia Zero4 Piu	Abarth	Fiat Abarth Grande Punto S2000	(Switzerland) Philippe Roux	(Switzerland) Eric Jordan	8
(Japan) Ralliart	Mitsubishi Ralliart	Mitsubishi Lancer Evo IX	(Japan) Hideaki Miyoshi	(Japan) Hakaru Ichino	1
(Italy) Island Motorsport	Mitsubishi Ralliart	Mitsubishi Lancer Evo IX	(Italy) Renato Travaglia	(Italy) Lorenzo Granai	2–5
(Bulgaria) Boyla Automotorsport	Mitsubishi Ralliart	Mitsubishi Lancer Evo IX	(Bulgaria) Dimitar Iliev	(Bulgaria) Yanaki Yanakiev	2–3, 5–6
(Poland) Cersanit Rally Team	Mitsubishi Ralliart	Mitsubishi Lancer Evo IX	(Poland) Michał Sołowow	(Poland) Maciek Baran	2
(Belgium) Duindistel	Mitsubishi Ralliart	Mitsubishi Lancer Evo IX	(Belgium) Larry Cols	(Belgium) Filip Goddé	3
(Belgium) Duindistel	Mitsubishi Ralliart	Mitsubishi Lancer Evo IX	(Belgium) Bob Colsoul	(Belgium) Tom Colsoul	3
(Belgium) Duindistel	Mitsubishi Ralliart	Mitsubishi Lancer Evo IX	(Belgium) Melisa Debackere	(Belgium) Isidoor Smets	3
(Belgium) Duindistel	Mitsubishi Ralliart	Mitsubishi Lancer Evo IX	(Belgium) Eddy Snaet	(Belgium) Filip Deplancke	3
(Russia) Prosport	Mitsubishi Ralliart	Mitsubishi Lancer Evo IX	(Russia) Andrey Zhigunov	(Russia) Igor Ter-Oganesiants	4
(Russia) Prosport	Mitsubishi Ralliart	Mitsubishi Lancer Evo IX	(Russia) Andrey Lagunov	(Russia) Sergey Grudina	4
(Russia) Prosport	Mitsubishi Ralliart	Mitsubishi Lancer Evo IX	(Russia) Dmitriy Lagunov	(Russia) Boris Kostyrko	4
(Czech Republic) Euro Oil Team	Mitsubishi Ralliart	Mitsubishi Lancer Evo IX	(Czech Republic) Václav Pech	(Czech Republic) Petr Uhel	6
(Czech Republic) Mediasport Czezh National Team	Mitsubishi Ralliart	Mitsubishi Lancer Evo IX	(Czech Republic) Václav Arazim	(Czech Republic) Julius Gal	6
(Czech Republic) Tescoma Rally Team	Mitsubishi Ralliart	Mitsubishi Lancer Evo IX	(Czech Republic) Roman Kresta	(Czech Republic) Petr Gross	6
Ralliart Italy	Mitsubishi Ralliart	Mitsubishi Lancer Evo IX	(Italy) Paolo Andreucci	(Italy) Anna Andreussi	7
Ralliart Italy	Mitsubishi Ralliart	Mitsubishi Lancer Evo IX	(Italy) Matteo Gamba	(Italy) Giancarla Guzzi	7
(India) MRF Tyres	Mitsubishi Ralliart	Mitsubishi Lancer Evo IX	(Finland) Jussi Valimaki	(Finland) Jarkko Kalliolepo	9
(India) MRF Tyres	Mitsubishi Ralliart	Mitsubishi Lancer Evo IX	(Japan) Katsuhiko Taguchi	(Australia) Mark Stacey	9
(China) Mitsubishi Lancer Team	Mitsubishi Ralliart	Mitsubishi Lancer Evo IX	(New Zealand) Brian Green	(New Zealand) Fleur Pedersen	9
(China) Mitsubishi Lancer Team	Mitsubishi Ralliart	Mitsubishi Lancer Evo IX	(China) Jixiang Wu	(Thailand) Zhongqi Li	9
(China) Mitsubishi Lancer Team	Mitsubishi Ralliart	Mitsubishi Lancer Evo IX	(Thailand) Fenghze Xie	(Taiwan) Tsung Yu Hsieh	9
(China) Mitsubishi Lancer Wan Yu Team	Mitsubishi Ralliart	Mitsubishi Lancer Evo IX	(United Kingdom) David Higgins	(United Kingdom) Ieuan Thomas	9
(China) Mitsubishi Lancer Wan Yu Team	Mitsubishi Ralliart	Mitsubishi Lancer Evo IX	(China) Qingxian Hua	(China) Jian Zhang	9
(China) Mitsubishi Lancer Wan Yu Team	Mitsubishi Ralliart	Mitsubishi Lancer Evo IX	(China) Fan Fan	(China) Shu Fan	9
(China) KST Rally Team	Mitsubishi Ralliart	Mitsubishi Lancer Evo IX	(United Kingdom) Martin Rowe	(Australia) Dale Moscatt	9
(China) Wu Ming Rally Team	Mitsubishi Ralliart	Mitsubishi Lancer Evo IX	(China) Lang Xu	(China) Yu Huang	9
(China) Wu Ming Rally Team	Mitsubishi Ralliart	Mitsubishi Lancer Evo IX	(China) Qinghong Li	(China) Hongyu Pan	9
(China) Wu Ming Rally Team	Mitsubishi Ralliart	Mitsubishi Lancer Evo IX	(China) Chunlei Shi	(China) Xin Shen	9
(Kenya) Dalbit Team	Mitsubishi Ralliart	Mitsubishi Lancer Evo 8	(United Kingdom) Alastair Cavenagh	(United Kingdom) Des Page-Morris	1
(Kenya) Triton Team	Mitsubishi Ralliart	Mitsubishi Lancer Evo 8	(Kenya) Lee Rose	(Kenya) Piers Daykin	1
(China) KST Rally Team	Mitsubishi Ralliart	Mitsubishi Lancer Evo 8	(China) Hongjie Wei	(China) Hongwei Song	9
(Kenya) Aztek Motorsport	Mitsubishi Ralliart	Mitsubishi Lancer Evo 7	(Kenya) Asad Anwar	(Kenya) Nick Patel	1
(India) MRF Tyres	Mitsubishi Ralliart	Mitsubishi Lancer Evo 7	(India) Gaurav Gill	(Australia) Glenn MacNeall	9
(Spain) Peugeot Sport España	Peugeot	Peugeot 207 S2000	(France) Nicolas Vouilloz	(France) Nicolas Klinger	2–8
(Spain) Peugeot Sport España	Peugeot	Peugeot 207 S2000	(Spain) Enrique García Ojeda	(Spain) Jordi Barrabés	2–8
(Belgium) Peugeot Team Belux	Peugeot	Peugeot 207 S2000	(Belgium) Bernd Casier	(Belgium) Frédéric Miclotte	3, 5–8
(Italy) Racing Lions SRL	Peugeot	Peugeot 207 S2000	(Italy) Luca Rossetti	(Italy) Matteo Chiarcossi	3, 7
(Italy) Racing Lions SRL	Peugeot	Peugeot 207 S2000	(France) Gilles Panizzi	(France) Xavier Panseri	7
(Hungary) Peugeot Total Hungaria	Peugeot	Peugeot 207 S2000	(Hungary) János Tóth	(Hungary) Bea Bahor	3, 6
(Hungary) Peugeot Total Hungaria	Peugeot	Peugeot 207 S2000	(Hungary) János Tóth	(Hungary) Robert Tagai	7
Peugeot Sport Sweden	Peugeot	Peugeot 207 S2000	(Sweden) Jimmy Joge	(Sweden) Mattias Andersson	4
Peugeot Sport Sweden	Peugeot	Peugeot 207 S2000	(Sweden) Jimmy Joge	(Sweden) Mathias Gardman	6
(France) Peugeot Total	Peugeot	Peugeot 207 S2000	(Portugal) Bruno Magalhães	(Portugal) Paulo Grave	5, 7
(France) BSA Team	Peugeot	Peugeot 207 S2000	(France) Brice Tirabassi	(France) Fabrice Gordon	7
(France) BSA Team	Peugeot	Peugeot 207 S2000	(France) Julien Pressac	(France) Thibault Gorczyca	7
(Switzerland) Lugano Racing Team	Peugeot	Peugeot 207 S2000	(Switzerland) Christian Jaquillard	(Switzerland) Christiane Jaquillard	8
(Switzerland) Scuderia Zero4 Piu	Citroën	Citroën C2 S1600	(Switzerland) Antonio Galli	(Italy) Paolo Brusadelli	8
(France) PH Sport	Citroën	Citroën C2 S1600	(France) Simon Jean-Joseph	(France) Jacques Boyere	2–3, 5–6
(France) PH Sport	Citroën	Citroën C2 R2	(France) Simon Jean-Joseph	(France) Jacques Boyere	4
(France) PH Sport	Citroën	Citroën C2 R2	(France) Laurent Viana	(France) Isabelle Galmiche	6
(Italy) JAS Motorsport	Honda	Honda Civic Type-R R3	(Spain) Daniel Solà	(Spain) Oscar Sanchez	2–6
(Italy) JAS Motorsport	Honda	Honda Civic Type-R R3	(Spain) Daniel Solà	(Spain) Carlos Del Barrio	7
(Italy) JAS Motorsport	Honda	Honda Civic Type-R R3	(Italy) Luca Betti	(Italy) Simone Cuneo	2
(Italy) JAS Motorsport	Honda	Honda Civic Type-R R3	(Italy) Luca Betti	(Italy) Giovanni Bernacchini	3–8
(Belgium) Belgian VW Club	Volkswagen	Volkswagen Polo S2000	(Belgium) Freddy Loix	(Belgium) Robin Buysmans	3
(Poland) ACE Racing	Volkswagen	Volkswagen Polo S2000	(Poland) Tomasz Czopik	(Ukraine) Glib Zagoriy	3

== Drivers standings ==
- The best seven scores from each driver count towards the championship.

Pos	Driver	SAF (Kenya)	TUR (Turkey)	YPR (Belgium)	RUS (Russia)	MAD (Portugal)	ZLI (Czech Republic)	SAN (Italy)	VAL (Switzerland)	CHN (China)	Pts
1	(Spain) Enrique García Ojeda		3	2	2	4	2	6	2		47
2	(France) Nicolas Vouilloz		1	Ret	3	10	1	3	1		42
3	(Italy) Andrea Navarra	3	2	3	4	Ret	7	10	Ret		32
4	(Italy) Luca Rossetti			1				1			20
5	(Italy) Giandomenico Basso					1		2			18
6	(Italy) Umberto Scandola	Ret		5				4	3		15
7	(Finland) Anton Alén		4		1		Ret				15
8	(Belgium) Bernd Casier			4		6	5	14	Ret		13
9	(United Kingdom) David Higgins									2	10
10	(Portugal) Bruno Magalhães					3		Ret			8
11	(China) Lang Xu									3	8
12	(Japan) Hideaki Miyoshi	4									8
13	(Czech Republic) Václav Pech						3				6
14	(United Kingdom) Martin Rowe									6	6
15	(Kenya) Asad Answar	7									6
16	(Belgium) Freddy Loix			Ret		Ret	Ret	11	4		5
17	(Czech Republic) Roman Kresta						4				5
18	(Portugal) José Pedro Fontes					5					5
19	(New Zealand) Brian Green									7	5
20	(Kenya) Sammy Aslam	8									5
21	(Italy) Renato Travaglia		5	13	Ret	Ret	8	Ret			5
22	(Italy) Marco Cavigioli		16	21	5	15	Ret	20			4
23	(Italy) Paolo Andreucci							5			4
24	(Italy) Luca Betti		21	Ret	Ret	Ret	22	30	9		4
25	(China) Qingxian Hua									9	4
26	(Kenya) Robert Gow	19									4
27	(France) Simon Jean-Joseph		8	10	11	8	10				4
28	(Turkey) Volkan Isik		6	Ret		14	13				3
29	(Czech Republic) Václav Arazim						6				3
30	(Italy) Corrado Fontana			Ret		7	Ret				3
31	(Belgium) Patrick Snijers			7							3
32	(Russia) Andrey Zhigunov				7						3
33	(Switzerland) Philippe Roux								10		3
34	(Japan) Shinichiro Karakama									10	3
35	(Tanzania) Navraj Hans	25									3
36	(Poland) Tomasz Czopik		7	11		Ret					2
37	(Bulgaria) Dimitar Iliev		Ret	8		Ret	Ret				2
38	(Russia) Boris Fedotov				8						2
39	(France) Gilles Panizzi							8			2
40	(Switzerland) Jean-Philippe Radoux								11		2
41	(China) Chunlei Shi									11	2
42	(Hungary) Gergely Szabo				9		17				1
43	(Portugal) Alexandre Camacho					9					1
44	(Switzerland) Devis Cremona								12		1
45	(Thailand) Fenghze Xie									12	1
Pos	Driver	SAF (Kenya)	TUR (Turkey)	YPR (Belgium)	RUS (Russia)	MAD (Portugal)	ZLI (Czech Republic)	SAN (Italy)	VAL (Switzerland)	CHN (China)	Pts

Key
Colour	Result
Gold	Winner
Silver	2nd place
Bronze	3rd place
Green	Points finish
Blue	Non-points finish
Blue	Non-classified finish (NC)
Purple	Did not finish (Ret)
Black	Excluded (EX)
Black	Disqualified (DSQ)
White	Did not start (DNS)
White	Cancelled (C)
Blank	Withdrew entry from the event (WD)

=== Manufacturers standings ===
Pos	Driver	SAF (Kenya)	TUR (Turkey)	YPR (Belgium)	RUS (Russia)	MAD (Portugal)	ZLI (Czech Republic)	SAN (Italy)	VAL (Switzerland)	CHN (China)	Pts
1	(France) Peugeot	0	16	18	14	14	18	16	18	0	114
2	(Italy) Abarth	10	13	10	15	15	0	13	11	0	87
3	(Japan) Mitsubishi	14	6	5	7	0	11	4	0	18	65
4	(Japan) Honda	0	0	0	0	0	0	0	4	3	7
5	(France) Citroën	0	1	1	0	2	0	0	0	0	4
Pos	Driver	SAF (Kenya)	TUR (Turkey)	YPR (Belgium)	RUS (Russia)	MAD (Portugal)	ZLI (Czech Republic)	SAN (Italy)	VAL (Switzerland)	CHN (China)	Pts
