= 2007 European Rally Championship =

Seasons
- ← 2006 2008 →

The 2007 European Rally Championship season was the 55th season of the FIA European Rally Championship. French driver Simon Jean-Joseph won his second European rally championship title despite not winning any of the 10 events.

== Calendar and winners ==
The calendar of the 2007 European rally championship season consisted of 10 events.

Round	Date	Event	Winner ERC
1	19–21 April	(Italy) Rally 1000 Miglia	(Bulgaria) Dimitar Iliev
2	11–12 May	(Turkey) Rally Istanbul	(France) Nicolas Vouilloz
3	24–26 May	Croatia Rally	(Croatia) Juraj Šebalj
4	8–10 June	Rally Poland	(Italy) Renato Travaglia
5	22–23 June	(Belgium) Ypres Rally	(Spain) Enrique García Ojeda
6	6–8 July	Rally Bulgaria	(Bulgaria) Dimitar Iliev
7	2–4 August	(Portugal) Rally Vinho da Madeira	(Spain) Enrique García Ojeda
8	24–26 August	(Czech Republic) Barum Rally Zlín	(France) Nicolas Vouilloz
9	5–7 October	(Greece) ELPA Rally	(Turkey) Volkan Işık
10	19–21 October	(France) Rallye Antibes Côte d'Azur	(Italy) Renato Travaglia

== Championship standings ==
For the final classification in a rally, the winner was awarded 10 points, the runner-up 8 and the third placed driver 6. Drivers ranked 4 to 8 got 5–4–3–2–1 point(s). Additionally, the top three of every leg got 3–2–1 point(s). Only drivers who participated in least 6 events qualified for the championship ranking.

Pos.	Driver	(Italy)	(Turkey)	(Croatia)	(Poland)	(Belgium)	(Bulgaria)	(Portugal)	(Czech Republic)	(Greece)	(France)	Points
1	(France) Simon Jean-Joseph	Ret	7	3	6	4	2	3	5	2	2	64
2	(Turkey) Volkan Işık	Ret	5	Ret	3	Ret	5	5	6	1	3	57
3	(Italy) Renato Travaglia	Ret	4		1	6	Ret	Ret	4	Ret	1	54
4	(Poland) Michał Sołowow	2	Ret	4	2	7	6		Ret	3	4	46
5	(Bulgaria) Dimitar Iliev	1	Ret	2		3	1	Ret	Ret	Ret	Ret	43
6	(Italy) Corrado Fontana	Ret		5		Ret	4	2	Ret		Ret	25
7	(Bulgaria) Krum Donchev	Ret	9	7			3			4	5	19
8	(Poland) Tomasz Czopik	Ret	6	6	5	5		Ret				16
9	(Czech Republic) Antonín Tlusťák	Ret	Ret	Ret	4	8			8			7
Not enough events to qualify for championship
	(Spain) Enrique García Ojeda		3			1		1	2			(51)
	(France) Nicolas Vouilloz		1			Ret		4	1			(40)
	(Italy) Andrea Navarra		2			2		Ret	3			(26)
	(Croatia) Juraj Šebalj			1			7			Ret		(15)

Key
Colour	Result
Gold	Winner
Silver	2nd place
Bronze	3rd place
Green	Points finish
Blue	Non-points finish
Blue	Non-classified finish (NC)
Purple	Did not finish (Ret)
Black	Excluded (EX)
Black	Disqualified (DSQ)
White	Did not start (DNS)
White	Cancelled (C)
Blank	Withdrew entry from the event (WD)
