= 2006 European Rally Championship =

Seasons
- ← 2005 2007 →

The 2006 European Rally Championship season was the 54th season of the FIA European Rally Championship. Italian driver Giandomenico Basso won his first European rally championship after winning 4 rallies.

== Calendar and winners ==
The calendar of the 2006 European rally championship season consisted of 9 events.

Round	Date	Event	Winner ERC
1	20–22 April	(Italy) Rally 1000 Miglia	(Italy) Paolo Andreucci
2	13–14 May	(Turkey) Rally Istanbul	(Italy) Giandomenico Basso
3	9–11 June	Rally Poland	(Poland) Leszek Kuzaj
4	23–24 June	(Belgium) Ypres Rally	(Italy) Giandomenico Basso
5	6–8 July	Rally Bulgaria	(Italy) Giandomenico Basso
6	3–5 August	(Portugal) Rally Vinho da Madeira	(Italy) Giandomenico Basso
7	25–27 August	(Czech Republic) Barum Rally Zlín	(Czech Republic) Roman Kresta
8	15–17 September	(Greece) ELPA Rally	(Bulgaria) Dimitar Iliev
9	20–22 October	(France) Rallye Antibes Côte d'Azur	(France) Bryan Bouffier

== Selected entries ==
Notable entry list
Constructor	Car	Team	Driver	Co-driver	Rounds
FIAT	Fiat Abarth Grande Punto S2000	(Italy) N-Technology	(Italy) Andrea Navarra	(Italy) Guido D'Amore	1
FIAT	Fiat Abarth Grande Punto S2000	(Italy) N-Technology	(Italy) Paolo Andreucci	(Italy) Anna Andreussi	1
FIAT	Fiat Abarth Grande Punto S2000	(Italy) N-Technology	(Italy) Giandomenico Basso	(Italy) Mitia Dotta	1-3
FIAT	Fiat Abarth Grande Punto S2000	(Italy) Giandomenico Basso	(Italy) Giandomenico Basso	(Italy) Mitia Dotta	4-6
FIAT	Fiat Abarth Grande Punto S2000	(Italy) Gass Racing	(Italy) Umberto Scandola	(Italy) Luigi Pirollo	4, 6
Citroën	Citroën C2	(France) Citroën Total WRT	(United Kingdom) Kris Meeke	(United Kingdom) Glenn Patterson	3
Mitsubishi	Mitsubishi Lancer Evo IX	(Bulgaria) Boyla Automotorsport	(Bulgaria) Dimitar Iliev	(Bulgaria) Yanaki Yanakiev	1-3, 5, 7-9
