= Enrique García Ojeda =

Spanish rally driver (born 1972)

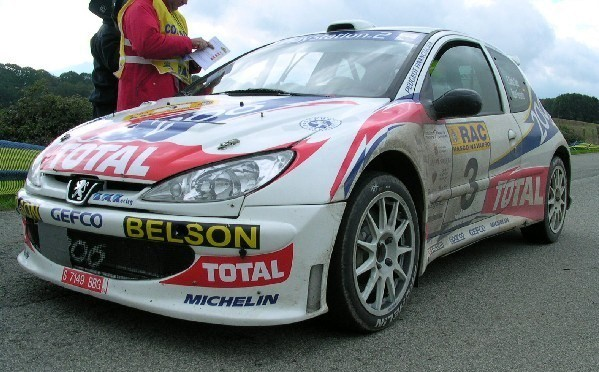
Ojeda in 2003.

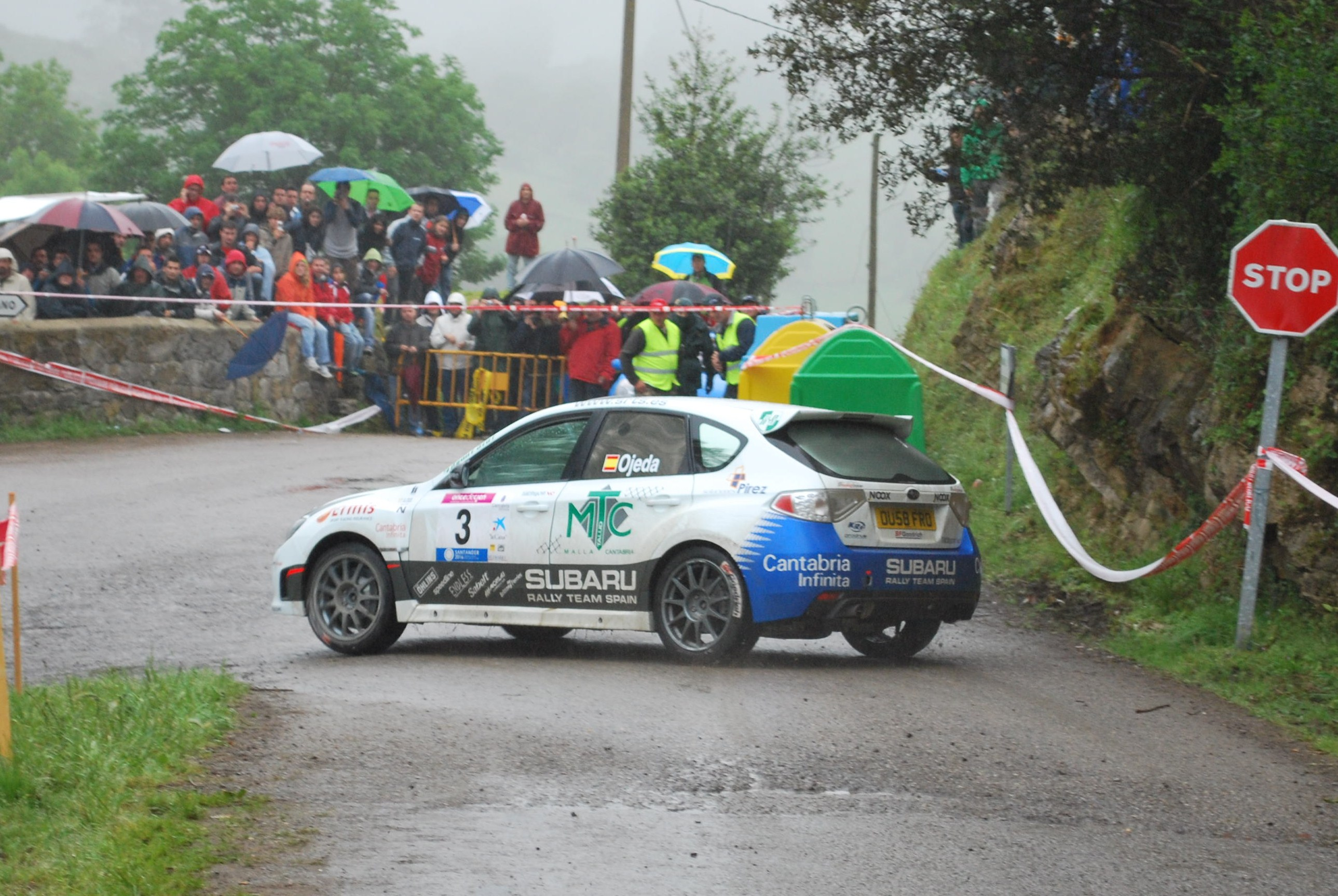
Ojeda driving for Subaru in 2009.

Enrique García Ojeda (born January 21, 1972, in Los Corrales de Buelna, Cantabria) is a Spanish rally driver, who won the 2007 Intercontinental Rally Challenge (IRC).

A regular competitor in Spanish rallies, including Rally Catalunya, Ojeda entered rounds of the first season of the IRC in 2006 as a Peugeot Sport España driver, in a Peugeot 206 S1600, with a best finish of seventh on the Ypres Rally. In 2007, Peugeot Sport España began running the Peugeot 207 S2000, which Ojeda drove to five podium finishes in the seven rounds he started, scoring points on all seven. Despite not winning an event, he was able to beat teammate Nicolas Vouilloz and the Abarth drivers to the title.

Kronos Racing and Peugeot Bel-Lux took over the running of the 207 S2000s in 2008, meaning Ojeda and Peugeot Sport España only entered two rounds, finishing fourth on Rally Príncipe de Asturias. He was able to win the Spanish Tarmac Championship. He began driving for Subaru in 2009.

== IRC results ==
Year	Entrant	Car	1	2	3	4	5	6	7	8	9	10	WDC	Points
2006	(Spain) Peugeot Sport España	Peugeot 207 S1600	RSA	YPR; 7	MAD; Ret	ITA; 13							23rd	2
2007	(Spain) Peugeot Sport España	Peugeot 207 S2000	KEN	TUR; 3	BEL; 2	RUS; 2	POR; 4	CZE; 2	ITA; 6	SWI; 2	CHI		1st	47
2008	(Spain) Peugeot Sport España	Peugeot 207 S2000	TUR	POR	BEL	RUS	POR	CZE; 13	ESP; 4	ITA	SWI	CHI	21st	4

Sporting positions
Preceded by Giandomenico Basso	Intercontinental Rally Challenge Champion; 2007	Succeeded by Nicolas Vouilloz
