= Peugeot 207 S2000 =

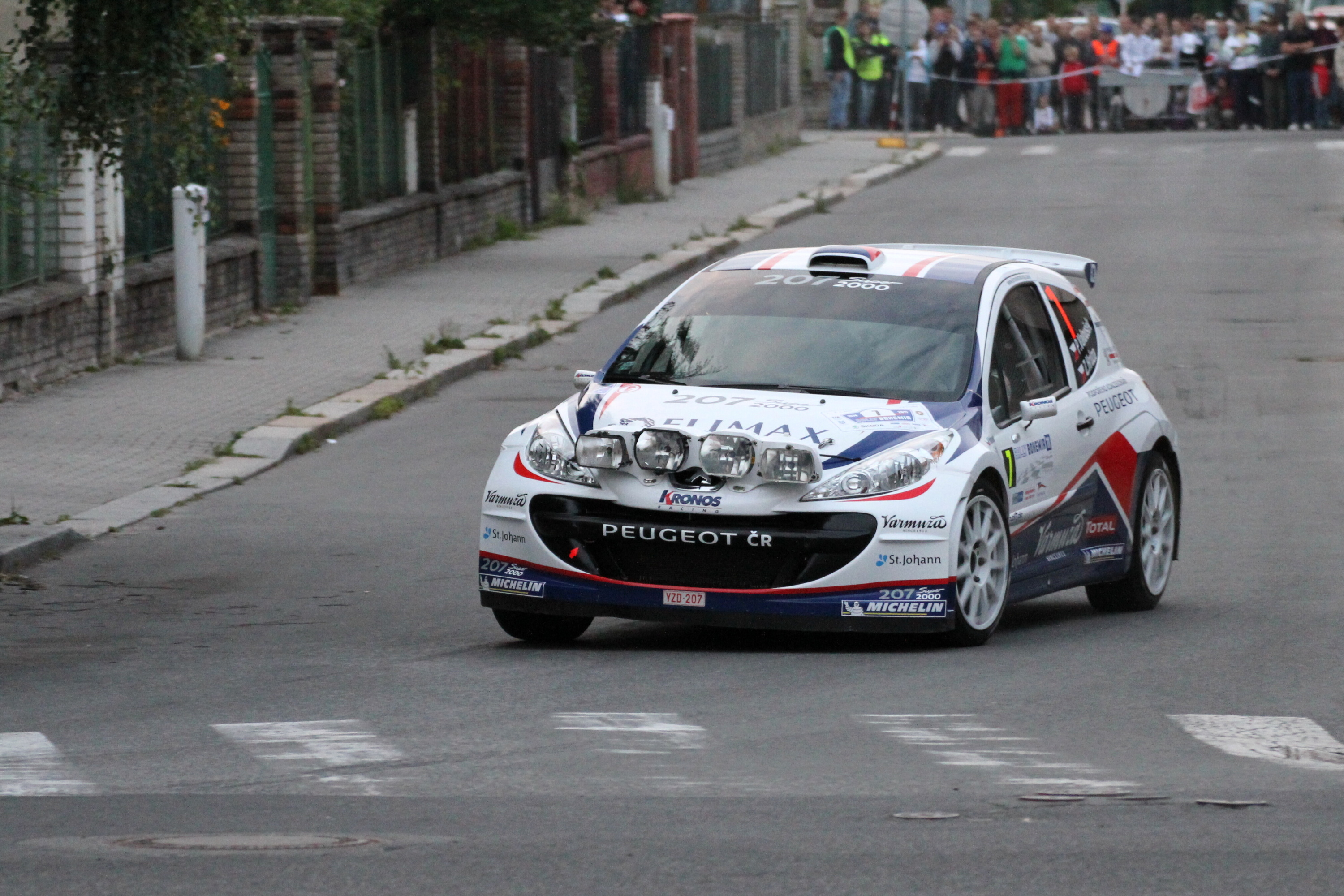

Overview
- Manufacturer: Peugeot/Peugeot Sport
- Production: 2007-
- Assembly: Paris, France
- Designer: Bertrand Vallat (project manager); Bruno Famin (technical manager, Peugeot Sport)

Body and chassis
- Class: Super 2000
- Layout: Front-engine, four-wheel drive

Powertrain
- Engine: 2.0 L (122 cu in) 4-cylinder, 16-valve
- Transmission: SADEV six-speed sequential gearbox with AP Racing clutch

Dimensions
- Wheelbase: 2,486 mm (97.9 in)
- Length: 4,000 mm (160 in)
- Width: 1,820 mm (72 in)
- Kerb weight: 1,200 kg (2,646 lb)

Chronology
- Predecessor: none
- Successor: Peugeot 208 T16

The Peugeot 207 S2000 is a Super 2000 rally car developed by Peugeot Sport. It is based upon the Peugeot 207 road car. Drivers Enrique García Ojeda, Nicolas Vouilloz and Kris Meeke won the Intercontinental Rally Challenge (IRC) drivers' title in 2007, 2008 and 2009 respectively in a Peugeot 207 S2000.

== IRC Victories ==
No.	Event	Season	Driver	Co-driver
1	2007 Rally of Turkey	2007	(France) Nicolas Vouilloz	(France) Nicolas Klinger
2	2007 Belgium Ypres Westhoek Rally	2007	(Italy) Luca Rossetti	(Italy) Matteo Chiarcossi
3	(Czech Republic) 2007 Barum Rally Zlín	2007	(France) Nicolas Vouilloz	(France) Nicolas Klinger
4	(Italy) 2007 Rallye San Remo	2007	(Italy) Luca Rossetti	(Italy) Matteo Chiarcossi
5	(Switzerland) 2007 Rallye International du Valais	2007	(France) Nicolas Vouilloz	(France) Nicolas Klinger
6	(Turkey) 2008 Istanbul Rally	2008	(Italy) Luca Rossetti	(Italy) Matteo Chiarcossi
7	2008 Rallye de Portugal	2008	(Italy) Luca Rossetti	(Italy) Matteo Chiarcossi
8	2008 Belgium Ypres Westhoek Rally	2008	(Belgium) Freddy Loix	(Belgium) Robin Buysmans
9	2008 Rally Russia	2008	(Finland) Juho Hänninen	(Finland) Mikko Markkula
10	(Portugal) 2008 Rali Vinho da Madeira	2008	(France) Nicolas Vouilloz	(France) Nicolas Klinger
11	(Czech Republic) 2008 Barum Czech Rally Zlín	2008	(Belgium) Freddy Loix	(Belgium) Robin Buysmans
12	(Switzerland) 2008 Rallye International du Valais	2008	(Belgium) Freddy Loix	(Belgium) Robin Buysmans
13	(Monaco) 2009 Monte Carlo Rally	2009	(France) Sébastien Ogier	(France) Julien Ingrassia
14	(Brazil) 2009 Rallye Internacional de Curitiba	2009	(United Kingdom) Kris Meeke	(Republic of Ireland) Paul Nagle
15	(Portugal) 2009 Rallye Açores	2009	(United Kingdom) Kris Meeke	(Republic of Ireland) Paul Nagle
16	2009 Belgium Ypres Westhoek Rally	2009	(United Kingdom) Kris Meeke	(Republic of Ireland) Paul Nagle
17	(Italy) 2009 Rallye Sanremo	2009	(United Kingdom) Kris Meeke	(Republic of Ireland) Paul Nagle
18	(Brazil) 2010 Rally International of Curitiba	2010	(United Kingdom) Kris Meeke	(Republic of Ireland) Paul Nagle
19	(Portugal) 2010 Rallye Açores	2010	(Portugal) Bruno Magalhães	(Portugal) Carlos Magalhães
20	(Italy) 2010 Rallye Sanremo	2010	(Italy) Paolo Andreucci	(Italy) Anna Andreussi
21	(Monaco) 2011 Monte Carlo Rally	2011	(France) Bryan Bouffier	(France) Xavier Panseri
22	(France) 2011 Tour de Corse	2011	(Belgium) Thierry Neuville	(Belgium) Nicolas Gilsoul
23	(Italy) 2011 Rallye Sanremo	2011	(Belgium) Thierry Neuville	(Belgium) Nicolas Gilsoul

== ERC Victories ==
No.	Event	Season	Driver	Co-driver
1	2007 Rally of Turkey	2007	(France) Nicolas Vouilloz	(France) Nicolas Klinger
2	2007 Belgium Ypres Westhoek Rally	2007	(Spain) Enrique García Ojeda	(Spain) Jordi Barrabés Costa
3	(Portugal) 2007 Rali Vinho da Madeira	2007	(Spain) Enrique García Ojeda	(Spain) Jordi Barrabés Costa
4	(Czech Republic) 2007 Barum Rally Zlín	2007	(France) Nicolas Vouilloz	(France) Nicolas Klinger
5	(Turkey) 2008 Istanbul Rally	2008	(Italy) Luca Rossetti	(Italy) Matteo Chiarcossi
6	(Italy) 2008 Rally 1000 Miglia	2008	(Italy) Luca Rossetti	(Italy) Matteo Chiarcossi
7	(Poland) 2008 Rajd Polski	2008	(Poland) Michał Sołowow	(Poland) Maciej Baran
8	2008 Belgium Ypres Westhoek Rally	2008	(Italy) Luca Rossetti	(Italy) Matteo Chiarcossi
9	2008 Rally Bulgaria	2008	(Bulgaria) Krum Donchev	(Bulgaria) Stoiko Valchev
10	(France) 2008 Rallye Antibes Cote d´Azur	2008	(Poland) Michał Sołowow	(Poland) Maciej Baran
11	(Turkey) 2009 Istanbul Rally	2009	(Poland) Michał Sołowow	(Poland) Maciej Baran
12	2009 Croatia Delta Rally	2009	(Bulgaria) Krum Donchev	(Bulgaria) Petar Yordanov
13	(Czech Republic) 2009 Barum Czech Rally Zlín	2009	(Poland) Michał Sołowow	(Poland) Maciej Baran
14	(Czech Republic) 2010 Barum Czech Rally Zlín	2010	(France) Bryan Bouffier	(France) Xavier Panseri
15	(Spain) 2010 Rally Principe de Asturias	2010	(Italy) Luigi Fontana	(Italy) Renzo Casazza
16	(France) 2010 Rallye Antibes Côte d'Azur	2010	(Italy) Luca Betti	(Italy) Guido d'Amore
17	2011 Rally Turkey	2011	(Italy) Luca Betti	(Italy) Maurizio Barone
18	(Spain) 2011 Rally Principe de Asturias	2011	(Italy) Luca Betti	(Italy) Maurizio Barone
19	(Portugal) 2012 Rali Vinho da Madeira	2012	(Portugal) Bruno Magalhães	(Portugal) Nuno Rodrigues da Silva
20	(Switzerland) 2012 Rallye International du Valais	2012	(Switzerland) Laurent Reuche	(Switzerland) Jean Deriaz
21	(France) 2013 Tour de Corse	2013	(France) Bryan Bouffier	(France) Xavier Panseri
22	(Italy) 2013 Rallye Sanremo	2013	(Italy) Giandomenico Basso	(Italy) Mitia Dotta
