= 2006 International Rally Challenge =

Seasons
- ← none 2007 →

The 2006 International Rally Challenge was the inaugural season of the rallying series, which was renamed to the Intercontinental Rally Challenge from 2007 onwards. The season consisted of four rounds and began on May 26, with the Zulu Rally South Africa. The season ended on September 16 with the Rally Sanremo. Giandomenico Basso won the title with Fiat Grande Punto Abarth S2000 ahead of Alister McRae and Paolo Andreucci.

== Calendar ==
Rd.	Start date	Finish date	Rally	Rally headquarters	Surface	Stages	Distance
1	26 May	27 May	35th Zulu Rally of South Africa	Durban, KwaZulu-Natal	Gravel	12	233.70 km
2	23 June	24 June	42th Belgium Ypres Westhoek Rally	Ypres, West Flanders	Asphalt	18	277.66 km
3	3 August	5 August	(Portugal) 47th Rali Vinho da Madeira	Funchal, Madeira	Asphalt	19	285.74 km
4	14 September	16 September	(Italy) 48th Rallye Sanremo	Sanremo, Liguria	Asphalt	10	188.72 km

== Driver Standings ==
Pos	Driver	RSA (South Africa)	YPR (Belgium)	MAD (Portugal)	ITA (Italy)	Pts
1	(Italy) Giandomenico Basso		1	1		20
2	(United Kingdom) Alister McRae	1				10
2	(Italy) Paolo Andreucci				1	10
4	(South Africa) Enzo Kuun	2				8
4	(Belgium) Kris Princen		2			8
4	(Portugal) Armindo Araujo			2		8
4	(Italy) Andrea Aghini				2	8
8	(France) Simon Jean-Joseph			5	5	8
9	(Italy) Renato Travaglia			8	3	7
10	(South Africa) Etienne Lourens	3				6
10	(Belgium) Larry Cols		3			6
10	(Portugal) Fernando Peres			3		6
13	(United Kingdom) Robbie Head	4				5
13	(Belgium) Freddy Loix		4			5
13	(Portugal) Bruno Magalhães			4		5
13	(Italy) Piero Longhi				4	5
17	(South Africa) Hergen Fekken	5				4
17	(Belgium) Bernd Casier		5			4
19	(South Africa) Fernando Rueda	6				3
19	(Estonia) Urmo Aava		6			3
19	(France) Gilles Panizzi			6		3
19	(Italy) Andrea Navarra				6	3
23	(South Africa) Nicholas Ryan	7				2
23	(Spain) Enrique García Ojeda		7	Ret	13	2
23	(Portugal) Filipe Freitas			7		2
23	(San Marino) Denis Colombini				7	2
27	(South Africa) Jean-Pierre Damseaux	8				1
27	(Belgium) Bob Colsoul		8			1
27	(Italy) Luca Rossetti				8	1
Pos	Driver	RSA (South Africa)	YPR (Belgium)	MAD (Portugal)	ITA (Italy)	Pts

Key
Colour	Result
Gold	Winner
Silver	2nd place
Bronze	3rd place
Green	Points finish
Blue	Non-points finish
Blue	Non-classified finish (NC)
Purple	Did not finish (Ret)
Black	Excluded (EX)
Black	Disqualified (DSQ)
White	Did not start (DNS)
White	Cancelled (C)
Blank	Withdrew entry from the event (WD)
