= Luca Rossetti (racing driver) =

Italian racecar driver

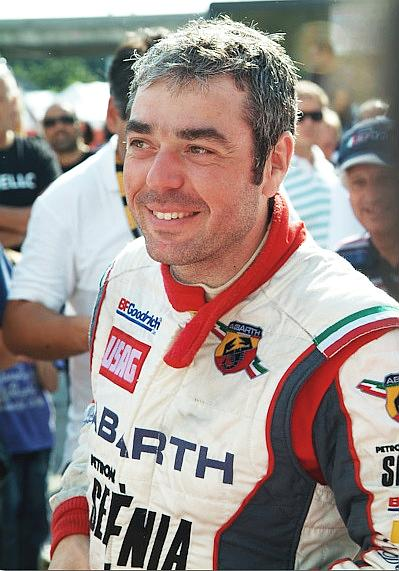
Luca Rossetti

Luca "ROX" Rossetti (born 24 March 1976) is an Italian rally driver. He won the Italian Rally Championship in 2008, the European Rally Championship in 2008, 2010 and 2011, and the Turkish Rally Championship in 2012 driving a Skoda Fabia S2000 for Pegasus Racing. Luca Rossetti's co-driver is Italian Matteo Chiarcossi.

== IRC results ==
Year	Entrant	Car	1	2	3	4	5	6	7	8	9	10	11	12	WDC	Points
2006	(Italy) Racing Lions SRL	Peugeot 206 S1600	RSA	YPR	MAD	ITA; 8									27th	1
2007	(Italy) Racing Lions SRL	Peugeot 207 S2000	KEN	TUR	BEL; 1	RUS	POR	CZE	ITA; 1	SWI	CHI				4th	20
2008	(Italy) Racing Lions SRL	Peugeot 207 S2000	TUR; 1	POR; 1	BEL; 3	RUS	POR; 5	CZE; 7	ESP	ITA; 3	SWI; 3	CHI			4th	44
2009	(Italy) Abarth & Co. SpA	Fiat Grande Punto Abarth S2000	MON; Ret	BRA	KEN	POR	BEL	RUS	POR; Ret	CZE; 10	ESP	ITA; 2	SCO		11th	8
2010	(Italy) Abarth & Co. SpA	Fiat Grande Punto Abarth S2000	MON	BRA	ARG	CAN	ITA	BEL	AZO	MAD; Ret	CZE	ITA; 5	SCO	CYP	22nd	4
2011	(Italy) Abarth & Co. SpA	Fiat Grande Punto Abarth S2000	MON	CAN	COR	YAL	YPR; 7	AZO	ZLI	MEC	SAN	SCO	CYP		29th	6

Sporting positions
Preceded by Simon Jean-Joseph	European Rally Champion; 2008	Succeeded by Giandomenico Basso
Preceded by Giandomenico Basso	Italian Rally Champion; 2008	Succeeded by Paolo Andreucci
Preceded by Giandomenico Basso	European Rally Champion; 2010–2011	Succeeded by Juho Hänninen
