= ELPA Rally =

The ELPA Rally was a rally competition held in the Chalkidiki peninsula in Greece. The rally was organised by the Automobile and Touring Club of Greece (ELPA) and was the second most important rally event in Greece after the Acropolis Rally. The first edition was held in 1976 under the name Chalkidiki Rally. Since 1977 the rally was regular part of the European Rally Championship. The 2011 edition of the rally was cancelled due to financial reasons and was never revived since.

== Previous winners ==
Sourced from

Year	Driver	Car
1976	(Greece) Tasos Livieratos	Alpine A110 1600
1977	(Greece) Tasos Livieratos	Datsun 160J
1978	(Italy) Antonio Carello	Lancia Stratos HF
1979	(Germany) Jochi Kleint	Opel Ascona 1.9 SR
1980	(Spain) Antonio Zanini	Porsche 911 SC
1981	(Italy) Adriatico Vudafieri	Fiat 131 Abarth
1982	(United Kingdom) Jimmy McRae	Opel Ascona 400
1983	(Italy) Tonino Tognana	Lancia 037 Rally
1984	(Italy) Carlo Capone	Lancia 037 Rally
1985	(Italy) Massimo Biasion	Lancia 037 Rally
1986	(Italy) Fabrizio Tabaton	Lancia Delta S4
1987	(Italy) Dario Cerrato	Lancia Delta HF 4WD
1988	(Italy) Fabrizio Tabaton	Lancia Delta Integrale
1989	(France) Yves Loubet	Lancia Delta Integrale
1990	(Italy) Michele Rayneri	Lancia Delta Integrale
1991	(Italy) Piero Liatti	Lancia Delta Integrale 16V
1992	(Germany) Erwin Weber	Mitsubishi Galant VR-4
1993	(Italy) Vanio Pasquali	Ford Escort RS Cosworth
1994	(Italy) Sergio Pianezzzola	Lancia Delta HF Integrale
1995	(Greece) Leonidas Kyrkos	Ford Escort RS Cosworth
1996	(Greece) Leonidas Kyrkos	Ford Escort RS Cosworth
1997	(Poland) Krzysztof Hołowczyc	Subaru Impreza 555
1998	(Greece) Armodios Vovos	Subaru Impreza WRC
1999	(Greece) Ioannis Papadimitriou	Subaru Impreza WRC
2000	(Denmark) Henrik Lundgaard	Toyota Corolla WRC
2001	(Greece) Armodios Vovos	Subaru Impreza WRC
2002	(Italy) Renato Travaglia	Peugeot 206 WRC
2003^{1}	(Belgium) Bruno Thiry	Peugeot 206 WRC
2004	(France) Simon Jean-Joseph	Renault Clio S1600
2005	(Italy) Giandomenico Basso	Fiat Punto S1600
2006	(Bulgaria) Dimitar Iliev	Mitsubishi Lancer Evo IX
2007	(Turkey) Volkan Işık	Fiat Abarth Grande Punto S2000
2008^{2}	(Greece) Lefteris Sothiris (ELPA Rally I)	Mitsubishi Lancer Evo IX
2008^{2}	(Greece) Ioannis Papadimitriou (ELPA Rally II)	Mitsubishi Lancer Evo IX
2009	Ioannis Papadimitriou (Greece)^{3}	Mitsubishi Lancer Evo IX
2009	(Italy) Giandomenico Basso (ERC)	Fiat Abarth Grande Punto S2000
2010	Armodios Vovos (Greece)^{4}	Mitsubishi Lancer Evo IX
2010	(Ukraine) Yuriy Protasov (ERC)	Mitsubishi Lancer Evo IX
2011	Canceled^{5}	

Notes:

- ^1 - The 2003 event was canceled after one stage due to fatal accident involving local driver Dimitris Kolopianos, who was killed instantly in the crash.
- ^2 - In the 2008 edition there were two separate ELPA Rally events - ELPA Rally I and ELPA Rally II
- ^3 - Ioannis Papadimitriou set the fastest overall time, but he was registered only for the national championship and not for the European Rally Championship, so therefore Giandomenico Basso is recognised as the official rally winner by the FIA.
- ^4 - Armodios Vovos set the fastest overall time, but he was registered only for the national championship and not for the European Rally Championship, so therefore Yuriy Protasov is recognised as the official rally winner by the FIA.
- ^5 - The 2011 event was canceled for economic reasons.
