= Genito Ortiz =

Spanish rally driver (1948–2026)

- Nationality: Spain
- Born: Eugenio Ortiz Alonso; 17 May 1948 Cantabria, Spain
- Died: 4 June 2026 (aged 78)

Championship titles
- 1983: Spanish Rally Championship

Eugenio Ortiz Alonso (17 May 1948 – 4 June 2026) was a Spanish rally driver. He was best known for winning the Spanish Rally Championship in 1983.

Ortiz died on 4 June 2026, at the age of 78.
