= Rally of Turkey =

Rally competition

- Status: active
- Genre: motorsporting event
- Country: Turkey
- Inaugurated: 2000

The Rally of Turkey (also known as Anatolian Rally) is a rally competition on the FIA World Rally Championship (WRC) schedule.

== History ==
First international rally in Turkey was held in 1972, starting and finishing in Istanbul. In 1999, the idea of creating an all-new event as a WRC candidate was conceived. The next year in 2000, the Anatolian Rally based in İzmir was born. After being observed by the FIA, the rally became an official reserve event for the WRC.

Antalya and Kemer, a holiday region in southwestern Turkey was chosen in 2001 as the start and finish venue for the Anatolian Rally adopting a WRC format. In 2002, first foreign entries took part, Sébastien Loeb in a Citroën Saxo and Juuso Pykälistö in a Peugeot 206 WRC.

Turkey debuted in the World Rally Championship in the 2003 season in which only 27 of the 62 entries finished. The first two years were dedicated to Junior World Rally Championship (JWRC) for gaining experience. In 2005, the Rally of Turkey hosted for the first time Production Car World Rally Championship (PWRC) drivers.

76 rally teams took part in the 2005 Rally of Turkey. Only 53 teams finished the total distance of 1,228 km. Repeating his victory of previous year, Sébastien Loeb of France won the cup at 4.21.48.00' with his co-driver Daniel Elena.

The 2006 event was held from October 13 to October 15, 2006 around Kemer – Kumluca – Antalya in southwestern Turkey on rough, gravel roads up into occasionally snowy mountain roads. Rally headquarters and the service park were located in Kemer.

The Rally of Turkey returned to the WRC calendar in for the 2008 season. The 2008 Rally of Turkey took place between June 12–15 and was won by Mikko Hirvonen ahead of Jari-Matti Latvala and Sébastien Loeb. The rally was removed from the calendar after the 2010 event.

The Rally of Turkey was revived for the 2018 championship as a replacement for Rally Poland. The event was based in the town of Marmaris in Muğla Province.

== Winners ==
Pink background indicates that in that year the rally was not part of WRC calendar.

Season	Name	Driver	Car	Report
2000	1. Anatolian Rally	(Turkey) Volkan Isik	Subaru Impreza WRC	
2001	2. Anatolian Rally	(Turkey) Serkan Yazici	Toyota Corolla WRC	
2002	3. Anatolian Rally	(Turkey) Ercan Kazaz	Subaru Impreza WRX	
2003	4. Rally of Turkey	(Spain) Carlos Sainz	Citroën Xsara WRC	Report
2004	5. Rally of Turkey	(France) Sébastien Loeb	Citroën Xsara WRC	Report
2005	6. Rally of Turkey	(France) Sébastien Loeb	Citroën Xsara WRC	Report
2006	7. Rally of Turkey	(Finland) Marcus Grönholm	Ford Focus RS WRC 06	Report
2007	8. Rally of Turkey	(France) Nicolas Vouilloz	Peugeot 207 S2000	Report
2008	9. Rally of Turkey	(Finland) Mikko Hirvonen	Ford Focus RS WRC 07	Report
2010	10. Rally of Turkey	(France) Sébastien Loeb	Citroën C4 WRC	Report
2018	11. Marmaris Rally of Turkey	(Estonia) Ott Tänak	Toyota Yaris WRC	Report
2019	12. Marmaris Rally of Turkey	(France) Sébastien Ogier	Citroën C3 WRC	Report
2020	13. Marmaris Rally of Turkey	(United Kingdom) Elfyn Evans	Toyota Yaris WRC	Report
