= Rally 1000 Miglia =

The Rally 1000 Miglia (English: Rally 1000 Miles) is an Italian Rally that has been held since 1977, and is part of the European Rally Championship and the Italian Rally Championship.

It is organised by the Automobile Club di Brescia and takes place on asphalt roads in the mountains of the Province of Brescia, in Lombardy, and is typically approximately 1,000 kilometres (620 mi) long.

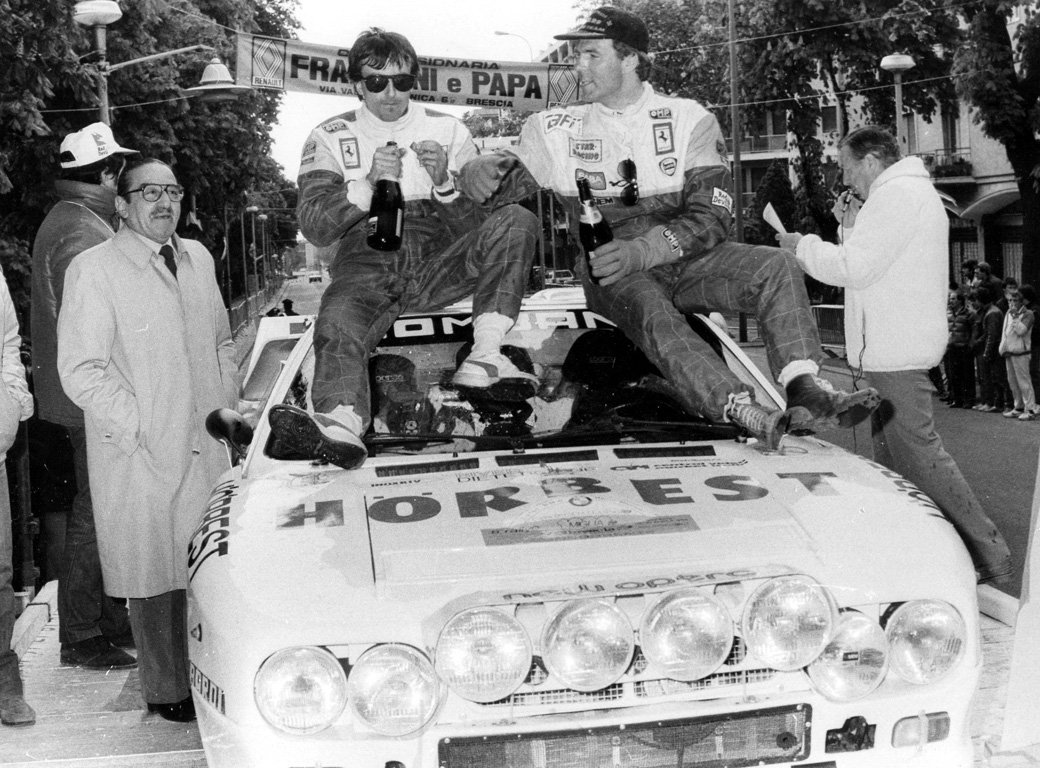
Nicola Busseni at The Rally 1000 Miglia

== Winners ==
Season	Edition	Driver	Codriver	Car	Series
1977	1. Rally 1000 Miglia	(Italy) Mario Pasetti	(Italy) Luigi Pirollo	Fiat 131 Abarth	CAR
1978	2. Rally 1000 Miglia	(Italy) Alessandro Cola	(Italy) Emilio Redaelli	Lancia Stratos HF	CAR
1979	3. Rally 1000 Miglia	(Italy) Giovanni Casarotto	(Italy) Stefano Zonta	Lancia Stratos HF	CAR
1980	4. Rally 1000 Miglia	(Italy) Nicola Busseni	(Italy) Roberto Bassi	Porsche Carrera RS	CAR
1981	5. Rally 1000 Miglia	(Italy) Nicola Busseni	(Italy) Roberto Bassi	Porsche Carrera RS	CAR
1982	6. Rally 1000 Miglia	(Italy) Carlo Cuccirelli	(Italy) Daniela Muttini	Porsche Carrera RS	CAR
1983	7. Rally 1000 Miglia	(Italy) Nicola Busseni	(Italy) Daniele Ciocca	Ferrari 308 GTB	CAR
1984	8. Rally 1000 Miglia	(Italy) Nicola Busseni	(Italy) Daniele Ciocca	Lancia 037 Rally	CAR
1985	9. Rally 1000 Miglia	(Italy) Fabrizio Tabaton	(Italy) Luciano Tedeschini	Lancia 037 Rally	CAR
1986	10. Rally 1000 Miglia	(Italy) Dario Cerrato	(Italy) Giuseppe Cerri	Lancia Delta S4	CAR
1987	11. Rally 1000 Miglia	(Italy) Gianfranco Cunico	(Italy) Stefano Evangelisti	Lancia 037 Rally	CAR
1988	12. Rally 1000 Miglia	(Italy) Dario Cerrato	(Italy) Giuseppe Cerri	Lancia Delta 4WD	CAR
1989	13. Rally 1000 Miglia	(Italy) Dario Cerrato	(Italy) Giuseppe Cerri	Lancia Delta Integrale	ERC5
1990	14. Rally 1000 Miglia	(Italy) Piero Liatti	(Italy) Luciano Tedeschini	Lancia Delta Integrale 16V	ERC5
1991	15. Rally 1000 Miglia	(Italy) Gianfranco Cunico	(Italy) Stefano Evangelisti	Ford Sierra RS Cosworth 4x4	ERC5
1992	16. Rally 1000 Miglia	(Italy) Lorenzo Colbrelli	(Italy) Roberto Berardi	Lancia Delta Integrale 16V	ERC5
1993	17. Rally 1000 Miglia	(Italy) Piero Longhi	(Italy) Gianfranco Imerito	Lancia Delta HF Integrale	ERC5, CAR
1994	18. Rally 1000 Miglia	(Italy) Piero Longhi	(Italy) Fabrizia Pons	Toyota Celica Turbo 4WD	ERC5, CAR
1995	19. Rally 1000 Miglia	(Italy) Gianfranco Cunico	(Italy) Stefano Evangelisti	Ford Escort RS Cosworth	ERC5, CAR
1996	20. Rally 1000 Miglia	(Italy) Gianfranco Cunico	(Italy) Pierangelo Scalvini	Ford Escort RS Cosworth	ERC10, CAR
1997	21. Rally 1000 Miglia	(Italy) Andrea Dallavilla	(Italy) Danilo Fappani	Subaru Impreza 555	ERC10, CIR
1998	22. Rally 1000 Miglia	(Italy) Gianfranco Cunico	(Italy) Luigi Pirollo	Ford Escort WRC	ERC10, CIR
1999	23. Rally 1000 Miglia	(Italy) Gianfranco Cunico	(Italy) Luigi Pirollo	Subaru Impreza WRC	ERC10, CIR
2000	24. Rally 1000 Miglia	(Italy) Paolo Andreucci	(Italy) Giovanni Bernacchini	Subaru Impreza WRC	ERC10, CIR
2001	25. Rally 1000 Miglia	(Italy) Renato Travaglia	(Italy) Flavio Zanella	Peugeot 206 WRC	ERC20, CIR
2002	26. Rally 1000 Miglia	(Italy) Renato Travaglia	(Italy) Flavio Zanella	Peugeot 206 WRC	ERC20, CIR
2003	27. Rally 1000 Miglia	(Portugal) Miguel Campos	(Portugal) Carlos Magalhães	Peugeot 206 WRC	ERC20, CIR
2004	28. Rally 1000 Miglia	(Italy) Giandomenico Basso	(Italy) Mitia Dotta	Fiat Punto S1600	ERC, CIR
2005	29. Rally 1000 Miglia	(Italy) Renato Travaglia	(Italy) Flavio Zanella	Renault Clio S1600	ERC, CIR
2006	30. Rally 1000 Miglia	(Italy) Paolo Andreucci	(Italy) Anna Andreussi	Fiat Grande Punto Abarth S2000	ERC, CIR
2007	31. Rally 1000 Miglia	(Italy) Giandomenico Basso	(Italy) Mitia Dotta	Fiat Grande Punto Abarth S2000	ERC, CIR
2008	32. Rally 1000 Miglia	(Italy) Paolo Andreucci	(Italy) Anna Andreussi	Mitsubishi Lancer Evo IX	ERC, CIR
2009	33. Rally 1000 Miglia	(Italy) Giandomenico Basso	(Italy) Mitia Dotta	Fiat Grande Punto Abarth S2000	ERC, CIR
2010	34. Rally 1000 Miglia	(Italy) Paolo Andreucci	(Italy) Anna Andreussi	Peugeot 207 S2000	ERC, CIR
2011	35. Rally 1000 Miglia	(Italy) Paolo Andreucci	(Italy) Anna Andreussi	Peugeot 207 S2000	ERC, CIR
2012	36. Rally 1000 Miglia	(Italy) Giandomenico Basso	(Italy) Mitia Dotta	Ford Fiesta 106 Turbo RRC	ERC, CIR
2013	37. Rally 1000 Miglia	(Italy) Alessandro Perico	(Italy) Fabrizio Carrara	Peugeot 207 S2000	CIR
2014	38. Rally 1000 Miglia	(Italy) Luca Pedersoli	(Italy) Matteo Romano	Citroen C4 WRC	CIWRC
2015	39. Rally 1000 Miglia	(Italy) Luca Rossetti	(Italy) Ivan Maurigi	Ford Fiesta WRC	CIWRC
2016	40. Rally 1000 Miglia	(Italy) Luca Pedersoli	(Italy) Anna Tomasi	Citroen C4 WRC	CIWRC
2017	41. Rally 1000 Miglia	(Italy) Stefano Albertini	(Italy) Danilo Fappani	Ford Fiesta WRC	CIWRC
2018	42. Rally 1000 Miglia	(Italy) Stefano Albertini	(Italy) Danilo Fappani	Ford Fiesta WRC	CIWRC
2019	43. Rally 1000 Miglia	(Italy) Luca Pedersoli	(Italy) Anna Tomasi	Citroën DS3 WRC	CIWRC
2020	Cancelled due to the COVID-19 pandemic				
2021	44. Rally 1000 Miglia	(Italy) Stefano Albertini	(Italy) Danilo Fappani	Škoda Fabia Rally2 evo	CIWRC
2022	45. Rally 1000 Miglia	(Italy) Andrea Crugnola	(Italy) Pietro Elia Ometto	Citroën C3 Rally2	CIWRC
2023	46. Rally 1000 Miglia	(Italy) Stefano Albertini	(Italy) Danilo Fappani	Škoda Fabia Rally2 evo	CIWRC
CAR/CIR/CIWRC – (Italian Rally Championship); ERC – European Rally Championship
