= Volkan Işık =

Turkish rally driver (born 1967)

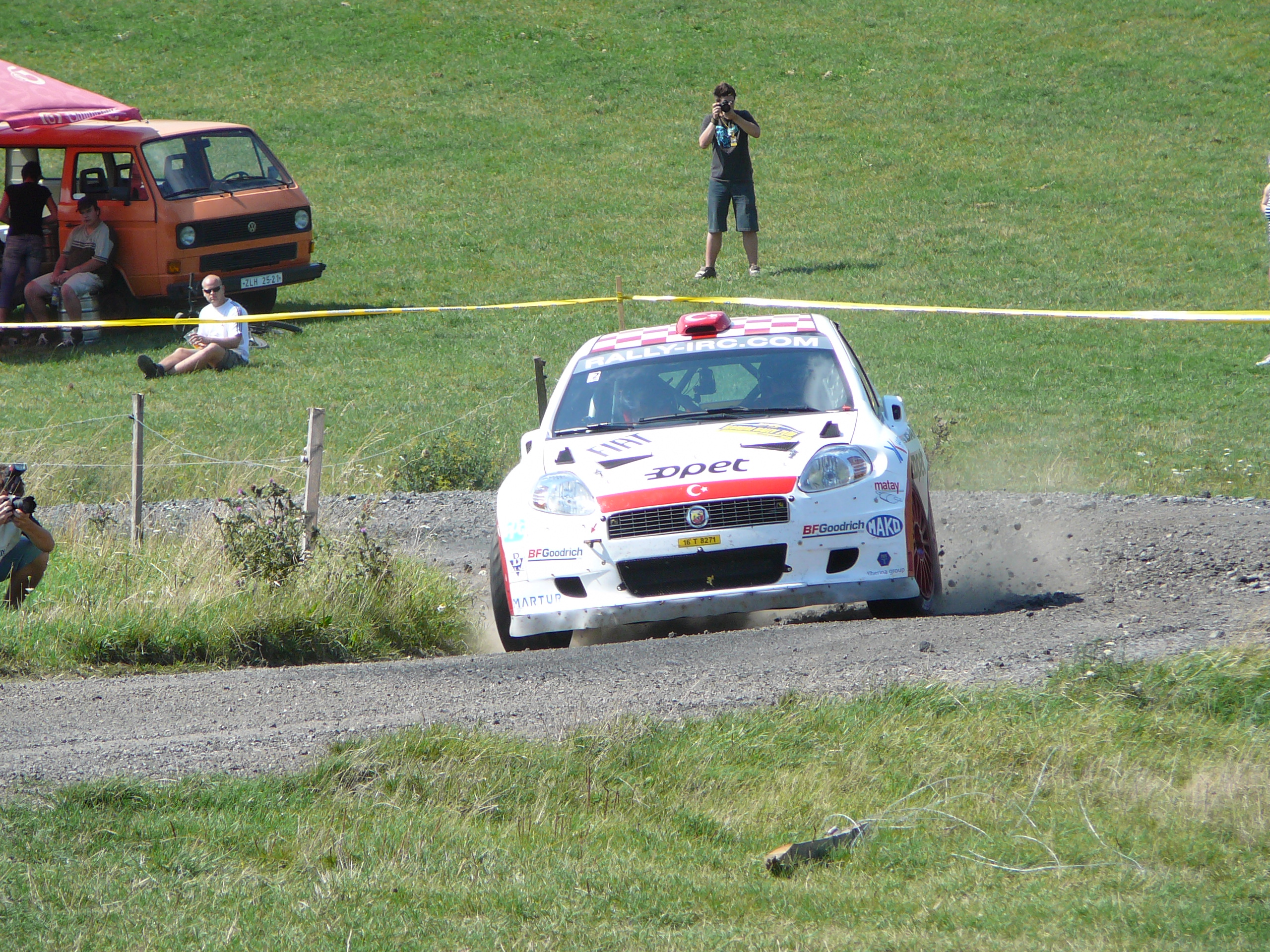

Personal information
- Nationality: (Turkey) Turkish
- Born: September 11, 1967 (age 59); Istanbul, Turkey

World Rally Championship record
- Years active: 1998-1999, 2003-2006
- Co-driver: (Turkey) Ilham Dökümcü (Turkey) Erkan Bodur (Turkey) Süren Çağlar (Turkey) Erkan Güleren (Turkey) Gür Levent (Turkey) Guray Karacar
- Teams: Toyota Mobil Team Turkey
- Rallies: 20
- Championships: 0
- Rally wins: 0
- Podiums: 0
- Stage wins: 0
- Total points: 1
- First rally: 1998 Rallye of Portugal
- Last rally: 2006 Rally of Turkey

Volkan Işık (born 11 September 1967) is a Turkish male rally driver.

Işık drove in the World Rally Championship in the late 1990s and early 2000s. In a Toyota Corolla WRC, Işık and his co-driver, Erkan Bodur, were sixth and thus scored their first WRC point at the 1999 China Rally, helped by most big names dropping out of the rally including Tommi Mäkinen and Colin McRae. He became the first Turkish driver to score WRC points. Işık has also competed in the European Rally Championship and Intercontinental Rally Challenge. In 2007, he won the ELPA Rally. Beyond this, throughout his rally career, he competed in vehicles such as the Opel Manta, Tofaş Murat 131, Renault 11 Turbo Group A, Lancia Delta HF Integrale Group A, Ford Escort RS Cosworth Group A, Ford Escort WRC, Toyota Celica GT-Four (ST205), Subaru Impreza WRC, Fiat Punto Kit car F3, Fiat Palio Super 1600, Fiat Punto Super 1600, Fiat Grande Punto Super 2000, Peugeot 206 WRC, Peugeot 207 S2000, Subaru Impreza WRX STi Group N, Mitsubishi Lancer Evolution IX Group N, Skoda Fabia S2000, Hyundai i20 R5 and Skoda Fabia Rally2 Evo.
