= Bosphorus Rally =

The Bosphorus Rally (also called Istanbul Rally, Fiat Rally, Rally of Turkey and Günaydin Rally) is a rally event, held near Istanbul, Turkey. It is one of the first international rally events in Turkey. The first Bosphorus Rally was held in 1972. The rally was regular part of the European Rally Championship since its first incarnation and was also included in the Intercontinental Rally Challenge calendar.

The Bosphorus Rally was also called Rally of Turkey for a while. However, the Rally of Turkey which became a round from the World Rally Championship has HQ in Antalya and thus it's completely different from the Bosphorus Rally.

The Rally is not to be confused with the Boğaziçi Rallisi, held since 1975, also called Bosphorus Rally in some editions.

== Winners ==
Year	Name^{1}	Driver	Car
1972	1. Günaydin Rally	(Turkey) Engin Serozan	Renault 12
1973	2. Günaydin Rally	(Turkey) Levent Pekün	Renault 12
1974	3. Günaydin Rally	(Turkey) Faruk Süren	Renault 12
1975	4. Günaydin Rallisi	(Turkey) Aytaç Kot	Renault 12
1976	5. Günaydin Rallisi	(Turkey) Renç Koçibey	Murat 124
1977	6. Günaydin Rally	(Turkey) Ali Bacıoğlu	Opel Kadett GT/E
1978	7. Günaydin Rally	(Bulgaria) Ilia Tchoubrikov	Renault 5 Alpine
1979	8. Uluslararası Günaydin Türkiye Rallisi	(Turkey) Renç Koçibey	Ford Escort RS 2000
1980	9. Günaydin Rally	(Turkey) Azmi Avcıoğu	Murat 131
1981	10. Günaydin Rally	(Bulgaria) Ilia Tchoubrikov	Renault 5 Alpine
1982	11. Günaydin Rally	(Bulgaria) Radoslav Petkov	Porsche 911
1983	12. Günaydin Rally	(Bulgaria) Ilia Tchoubrikov	Renault 5 Alpine
1984	13. Günaydin Rally	(Austria) Franz Wurz	Audi Quattro
1985	14. Günaydin Rally	(Finland) Kalevi Aho	Opel Manta 400
1986	15. Günaydin Rally	(Austria) Gerhard Kalnay	Škoda 130 LR
1987	16. Günaydin International Turkish Rally	(Finland) Kalevi Aho	Renault 11 Turbo
1988	17. Günaydin Rally	(Turkey) Emre Yerlici	Audi Coupé Quattro
1989	18. Günaydin Turkiye Rallisi	(Turkey) Emre Yerlici	Lancia Delta Integrale
1990	19. Günaydin Rally	(France) Philippe Bugalski	Renault 11 Turbo
1991	20. Rally of Turkey	(Turkey) Ali Bacıoğlu	Lancia Delta Integrale
1992	21. Rally of Turkey	(Turkey) İskender Atakan	Lancia Delta Integrale
1993	22. Rally of Turkey	(Turkey) İskender Atakan	Lancia Delta Integrale
1994	23. International Rally of Turkey	(Turkey) Ercan Kazaz	Lancia Delta Integrale
1995	24. Rally of Turkey	(United Kingdom) Mark Higgins	Nissan Sunny GTI
1996	25. Rally of Turkey	(Turkey) Serdar Bostancı	Ford Escort RS Cosworth
1997	26. Rally of Turkey	(Turkey) Volkan Işık	Ford Escort WRC
1998	27. Rally of Turkey	(Italy) Alessandro Fiorio	Ford Escort RS Cosworth
1999	28. Rally of Turkey	(Turkey) Volkan Işık	Toyota Celica GT-Four
2000	29. Rally of Turkey	(Denmark) Henrik Lundgaard	Toyota Corolla WRC
2001	30. Tofaş Rally Turkey	(Germany) Armin Kremer	Toyota Corolla WRC
2002	31. Tofaş Rally Turkey	(Poland) Janusz Kulig	Ford Focus RS WRC
2003	32. Tofaş Rally Turkey	(Belgium) Bruno Thiry	Peugeot 206 WRC
2004	33. FIAT Rally	(France) Simon Jean Joseph	Renault Clio S1600
2005	34. FIAT Rally	(France) Simon Jean Joseph	Renault Clio S1600
2006	35. FIAT Rally	(Italy) Giandomenico Basso	Fiat Abarth Grande Punto S2000
2007	36. FIAT Rally	(France) Nicolas Vouilloz	Peugeot 207 S2000
2008	37. Istanbul Rally	(Italy) Luca Rossetti	Peugeot 207 S2000
2009	38. Istanbul Rally	(Poland) Michał Sołowow	Peugeot 207 S2000
2010	39. Bosphorus Rally	(Italy) Luca Rossetti	Fiat Abarth Grande Punto S2000
2011	40. Bosphorus Rally	(Turkey) Yağiz Avci (Overall)^{2}	Ford Fiesta S2000
2011	40. Bosphorus Rally	(Italy) Luca Betti (ERC)	Peugeot 207 S2000
2012	41. Bosphorus Rally	(Finland) Juho Hänninen	Škoda Fabia S2000
2013	42. Bosphorus Rally	(Turkey) Orhan Avcioğlu	Ford Fiesta S2000
2014	43. Bosphorus Rally	(Turkey) Murat Bostanci	Ford Fiesta S2000
2015	44. Bosphorus Rally	(Turkey) Murat Bostanci	Ford Fiesta S2000
2016	45. Marmaris Rally Turkey	(Turkey) Yagiz Avci	Peugeot 208 T16 R5
2017	46. Marmaris Rally Turkey	(Turkey) Orhan Avcioğlu	Škoda Fabia R5

Notes:

- ^1 - The rally had various name incarnations during the years.
- ^2 - Yağiz Avci set the overall fastest time, but he wasn't registered for the European Rally Championship and therefore he isn't recognized as the winner by the FIA. In ERC FIA recognized the second fastest overall Luca Betti as winner.
