= Rally Princesa de Asturias =

Rally Príncipe de Asturias
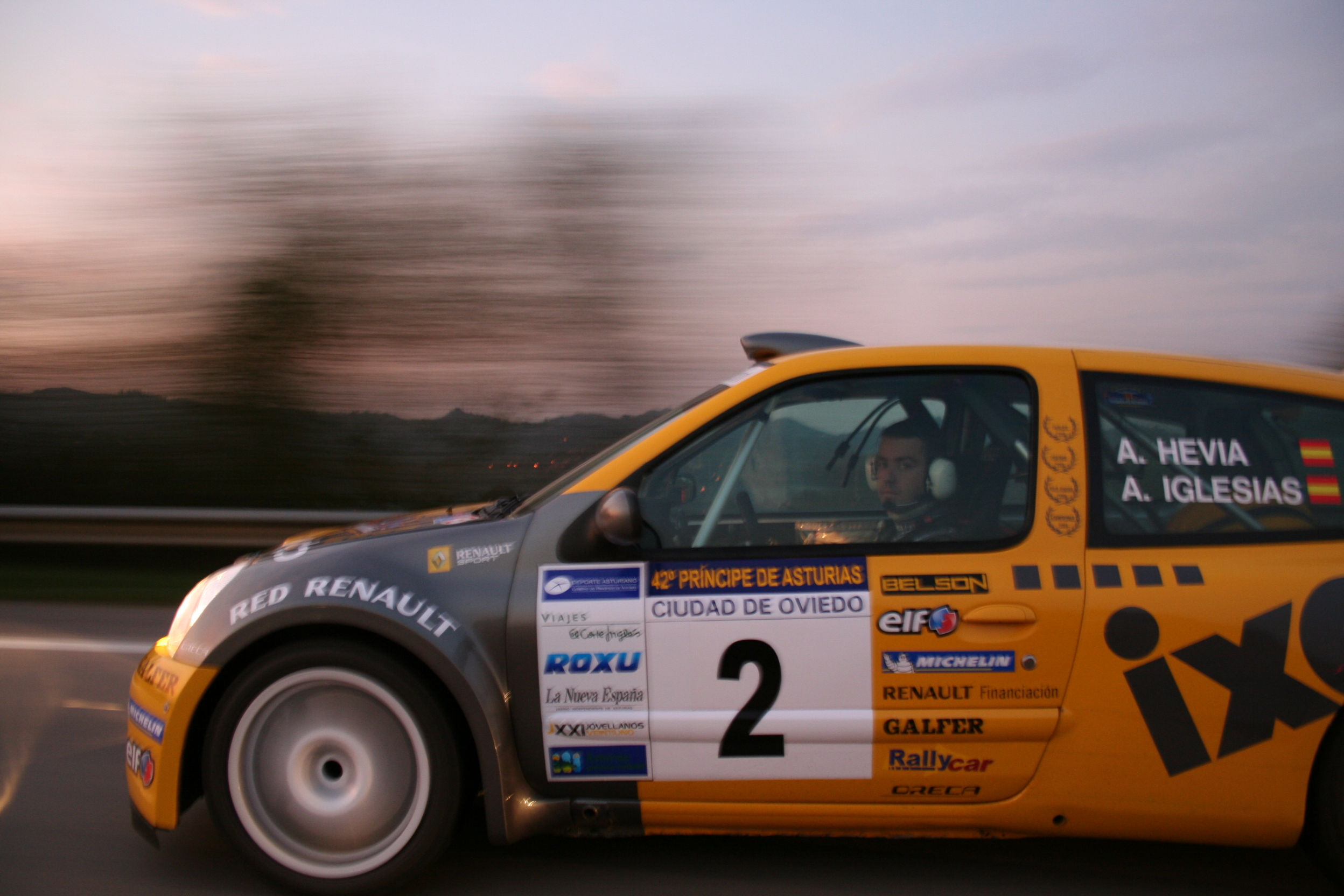
- Alberto Hevia in 2005 driving a Renault Clio S1600.
- Category: Rally
- Country: ESP Asturias, Spain
- Inaugural season: 1964
- Drivers' champion: ESP Miguel Ángel Fuster
- Official website: rallyprincipe.com

The Rally Príncipe de Asturias is a rally motorsport competition usually held in September in Asturias, Spain, organized by the Automóvil Club Principado de Asturias (ACPA). In the early years, the championship was called Rally de la Ciudad de Oviedo.

The rally started in 1964, becoming the oldest and most popular car competition in Spain. In its first year, the entree fee was 800 pesetas and had a purse of 30,000 pesetas.

This competition is part of the Spanish Rally Championship, the Asturias Rally Championship and the European Rally Championship (western zone) with a maximum coefficient. On July 19, 2007, it was included in the 2008 calendar of the Intercontinental Rally Challenge and was repeated for two additional seasons.

The championship is split into the following segments:

- Tuesday and Wednesday: Registration and other administrative tasks
- Thursday: Shakedown, technical checks, and official ceremony.
- Friday and Saturday: The race, split into three stages. The two first are on Friday and the last on Saturday morning.

Although in April 2013 the Rally fell from the calendar due to a lack of institutional support and was later announced to be canceled, the organization managed to get the support of the board of the Cangas del Narcea and was able to re-establish the competition for the year.

On June 29, 2013, the first "Rally Fórmula Príncipe de Asturias" was held with the intention to raise funds for the rally. The event was held in the "Toño Fernández" circuit in the town of Cibuyo, in Cangas del Narcea, and on the 14th, 15th, and 16 September 50th anniversary was celebrated. The winner of the race was Luis Monzón (Mini John Cooper Works WRC), followed by Sergio Vallejo (Porsche 911) and Óscar Palacio (Porsche 911).

The Rally de Asturias Histórico is a classic rally held since 2009, and is a round of the European Historic Rally Championship since 2014.

== Champions ==
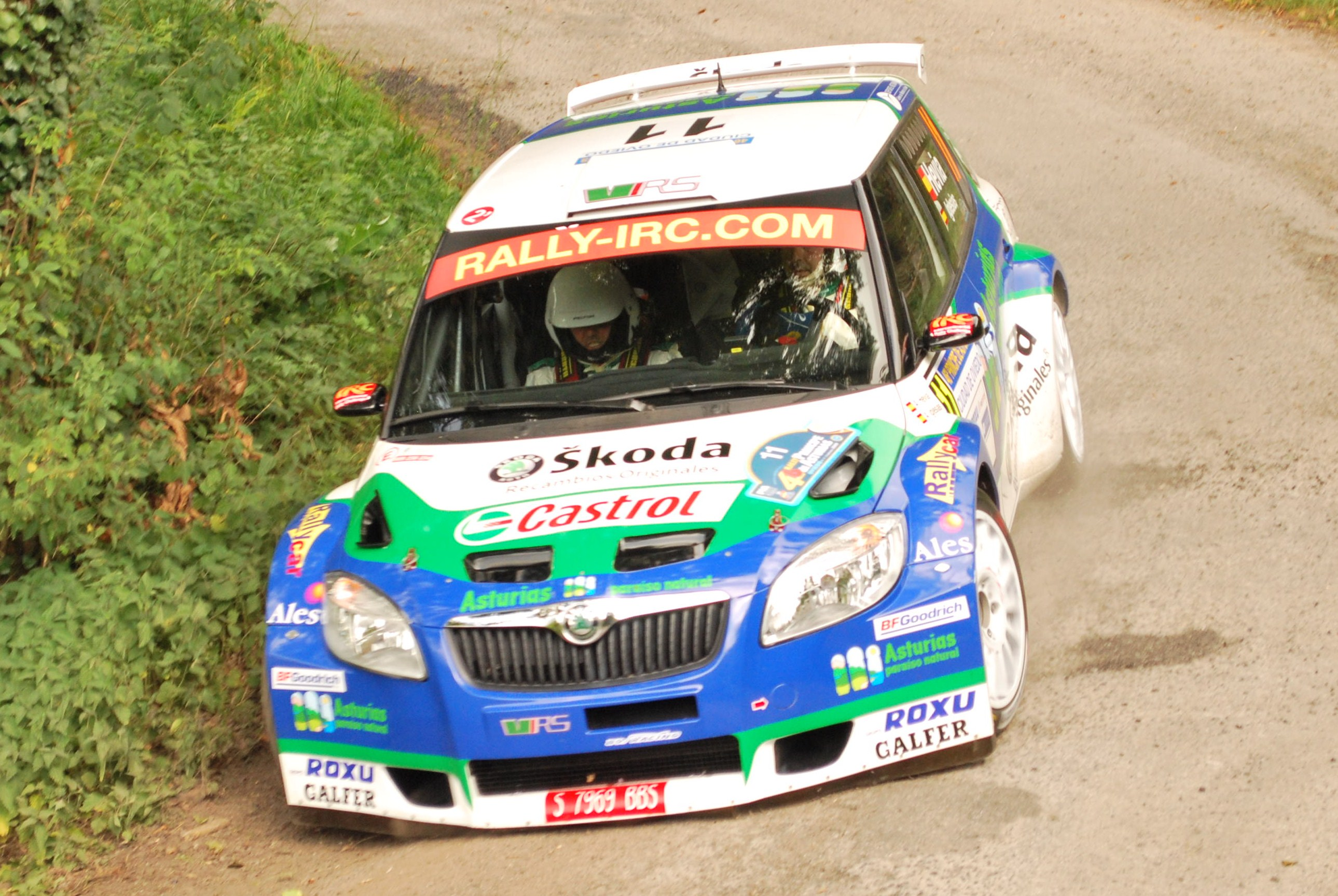
Alberto Hevia in the 2009 Rally Príncipe de Asturias.

Annual champions
Year	Edición	Driver	Copilot	Car	Series
1964	1st Rally de la Ciudad de Oviedo	(Spain) Luis Huerta	(Spain) José Luis Tuya	Ford Cortina Lotus	
1965	2nd Rally de la Ciudad de Oviedo	(Spain) Luis Fernández Trabanco	(Spain) Manuel González	Morris 1.100	
1966	3rd Rally de la Ciudad de Oviedo	(Spain) Pedro Puche	(Spain) Pedro Amengual	Saab 99 Sport	Spain
1967	4th Rally de la Ciudad de Oviedo	Roter Barón Ben	(Spain) Ricardo Muñoz	Porsche 911	Spain
1968	5th Rally de la Ciudad de Oviedo	(France) Bernard Tramont	(Spain) Ricardo Muñoz	Renault-Alpine A 110	Spain
1969	6th Rally de la Ciudad de Oviedo	(France) Bernard Tramont	(Spain) Luis Blasco	Renault Alpine A 110	Spain
1970	7th Rallye Premio Ciudad de Oviedo	(Spain) Eladio Doncel	(Spain) Juan A. Conde	Porsche 911 S	Spain
1971	8th Rallye Premio Ciudad de Oviedo	(Spain) Alberto R. Jiménez	(Spain) Juan A. Conde	Porsche 911 S	Spain
1972	9th Rallye Ciudad de Oviedo	(Spain) Estanislao Reverter	(Spain) Antonio Reverter	Renault Alpin che	Spain
1973	10th ?	(Spain) J. I. Villacieros	(Spain) J.A. Lobo	Renault Alpine 1600	Spain
1974	11th ?	(Spain) Salvador Cañellas	(Spain) Daniel Ferrater	Seat 1430-1800	Spain
1975	12th Rallye Príncipe de Asturias	(Spain) Antonio Zanini	(Spain) Eduardo M. Adam	Seat 1430-1800	Spain
1976 - Not held
1977	14th Rally Príncipe de Asturias	(Spain) José María Puig	(Spain) Enrique	Seat 124/1800	Spain
1978	15th Rally Príncipe de Asturias	(Spain) Tino Suárez	(Spain) J.B. Pino	Seat FL-80	Spain
1979	16th Rally Príncipe de Asturias	(Spain) Aladino Martínez	(Spain) López	Seat 124/1200	Spain
1980	17th Rally Príncipe de Asturias	(Spain) José Antonio López-Fombona	(Spain) L. Menéndez	Fiat 131 Abarth	Spain
1981	18th Rally Príncipe de Asturias	(Spain) Genito Ortiz	(Spain) Susi Cabal	Renault 5 Turbo 2	Spain
1982	19th Rally Príncipe de Asturias	(Spain) Antonio Zanini	(Spain) J. Sabater	Talbot Sumbeam Lotus	Spain
1983	20th Rally Príncipe de Asturias	(Spain) Genito Ortiz	(Spain) R. Mínguez	Renault 5 Turbo	ERC, Spain
1984	21st Rally Príncipe de Asturias	(Spain) Salvador Serviá	(Spain) J. Sabater	Opel Manta 400	ERC, Spain
1985	22nd Rally Príncipe de Asturias	(Spain) Salvador Serviá	(Spain) J. Sabater	Lancia 037 Rallye	ERC, Spain
1986	23rd Rally Príncipe de Asturias	(Italy) Fabrizio Tabaton	(Italy) Tedeschini	Lancia Delta S4	ERC, Spain
1987	24th Rally Príncipe de Asturias	(Spain) Carlos Sainz	(Spain) Antonio Boto	Ford Sierra Cosworth	Spain
1988	25th Rally Príncipe de Asturias	(Italy) Alex Fiorio	(Italy) L. Pirollo	Lancia Delta HF-1	Spain
1989	26th Rally Príncipe de Asturias	(Spain) Pep Bassas	(Spain) A. Rodríguez	BMW M3	Spain
1990	27th Rally Príncipe de Asturias	(Spain) Jesús Puras	(Spain) J. Arrate	Lancia Delta Integrale I 16V	Spain
1991	28th Rally Príncipe de Asturias	(Spain) José María Ponce	(Spain) José Carlos Deniz	BMW M3	Spain
1992	29th Rally Príncipe de Asturias	(Spain) Pedro Diego	(Spain) Icíar Muguerza	Lancia Delta I 16V	Spain
1993	30th Rally Príncipe de Asturias	(Spain) Daniel Alonso	(Spain) Salvador Belzunces	Ford Escort Cosworth Gr.N	ERC, Spain
1994	31st Rally Príncipe de Asturias	(Spain) Oriol Gómez	(Spain) Marc Martí	Renault Clio Williams	ERC, Spain
1995	32nd Rally Príncipe de Asturias	(Spain) Luis Monzón	(Spain) José Carlos Deniz	Ford Escort Cosworth	ERC, Spain
1996	33rd Rally Príncipe de Asturias	(Spain) Oriol Gómez	(Spain) Marc Martí	Renault Mégane Maxi	ERC, Spain
1997	34th Rally Príncipe de Asturias	(Spain) Jesús Puras	(Spain) Carlos del Barrio	Citroën ZX 16V	ERC, Spain
1998	35th Rally Príncipe de Asturias	(Spain) Jesús Puras	(Spain) Carlos del Barrio	Citroën Xsara Kit Car	ERC, Spain
1999	36th Rally Príncipe de Asturias	(Spain) Jesús Puras	(Spain) Carlos del Barrio	Citroën Xsara Kit Car	Spain
2000	37th Rally Príncipe de Asturias	(Spain) Jesús Puras	(Spain) Marc Martí	Citroën Xsara Kit Car	Spain
2001	38th Rally Príncipe de Asturias	(Spain) Luis Monzón	(Spain) José Carlos Déniz	Peugeot 206 WRC	Spain
2002	39th Rally Príncipe de Asturias	(Spain) Manuel Cabo	(Spain) Eduardo González	Citroën Saxo Kit Car	Spain
2003	40th Rally Príncipe de Asturias	(Spain) Enrique García Ojeda	(Spain) Raquel Fernández	Peugeot 206 S1600	Spain
2004	41st Rally Príncipe de Asturias	(Spain) Alberto Hevia	(Spain) Alberto Iglesias Pin	Renault Clio S1600	ERC, Spain
2005	42nd Rally Príncipe de Asturias	(Spain) Daniel Sordo	(Spain) Marc Martí	Citroën C2 S1600	ERC, Spain
2006	43rd Rally Príncipe de Asturias	(Spain) Dani Solà	(Spain) Xavier Amigo	Citroën C2 S1600	Spain
2007	44th Rally Príncipe de Asturias	(Spain) Enrique García Ojeda	(Spain) Jordi Barrabés	Peugeot 207 S2000	Spain
2008	45th Rally Príncipe de Asturias	(Italy) Giandomenico Basso	(Italy) Mitia Dotta	Fiat Grande Punto S2000	IRC, Spain
2009	46th Rally Príncipe de Asturias	(Czech Republic) Jan Kopecký	(Czech Republic) Petr Starý	Škoda Fabia S2000	IRC, ERC, Spain
2010	47th Rally Príncipe de Asturias	(Spain) Alberto Hevia	(Spain) Alberto Iglesias Pin	Škoda Fabia S2000	ERC, Spain
2011	48th Rally Príncipe de Asturias	(Spain) Alberto Hevia	(Spain) Alberto Iglesias Pin	Škoda Fabia S2000	ERC, Spain
2012	49th Rally Príncipe de Asturias	(Andorra) Joan Vinyes	(Spain) Jordi Mercader	Suzuki Swift S1600	ERC, Spain
2013	50th Rally Príncipe de Asturias	(Spain) Luis Monzón	(Spain) José Carlos Déniz	Mini John Cooper Works WRC	Spain
2014	51st Rally Príncipe de Asturias	(Spain) Miguel Ángel Fuster	(Spain) Ignacio Aviñó	Ford Fiesta R5	Spain
2015	52nd Rally Príncipe de Asturias	(Spain) Miguel Ángel Fuster	(Spain) Ignacio Aviñó	Porsche 997 GT3 RS 3.8	Spain
2016	53rd Rally Príncipe de Asturias	(Spain) Iván Ares	(Spain) José Antonio Pintor	Skoda Fabia R5	Spain
2017	54th Rally Príncipe de Asturias	(Spain) Iván Ares	(Spain) José Antonio Pintor	Hyundai i20 R5	Spain
