= Rallye International du Valais =

Car race in Switzerland

The Rallye International du Valais is a yearly rally in the canton of Valais in Switzerland. It was founded by Philippe Simonetta, a local wine dealer in 1960. Since 1980 it has been part of the European Rally Championship and in 2007 and 2008 it was an event of the Intercontinental Rally Challenge. In 2009, it became a top category (coeff. 20) event of the European Rally Championship and since then it has been the final event of the ERC season. The rally headquarters is in Martigny.

== Recent winners ==
Year	Series	Driver	Co-Driver	Car
2023	ERT	(Switzerland) Jonathan Hirschi	(Switzerland) Sarah Lattion	Škoda Fabia Rally2 evo
2022	Alps Rally Trophy	(Switzerland) Mike Coppens	(Switzerland) Christophe Roux	Škoda Fabia Rally2 evo
2021	Alps Rally Trophy	(Switzerland) Mike Coppens	(Switzerland) Christophe Roux	Škoda Fabia Rally2 evo
2019	TER, ERT	(Switzerland) Olivier Burri	(Switzerland) Fabrice Gordon	Škoda Fabia R5
2018	TER	(Italy) Giandomenico Basso	(Italy) Lorenzo Granai	Škoda Fabia R5
2017	TER	(Italy) Giandomenico Basso	(Italy) Lorenzo Granai	Hyundai i20 R5
2016	TER	(Switzerland) Sébastien Carron	(Switzerland) Lucien Revaz	Ford Fiesta R5
2015	ERC	(Russia) Alexey Lukyanuk	(Russia) Alexey Arnautov	Ford Fiesta R5
2014	ERC	(Finland) Esapekka Lappi	(Finland) Janne Ferm	Škoda Fabia S2000
2013	ERC	(Finland) Esapekka Lappi	(Finland) Janne Ferm	Škoda Fabia S2000
2012	ERC	(Switzerland) Laurent Reuche	(Switzerland) Jean Deriaz	Peugeot 207 S2000
2011	ERC	(Switzerland) Laurent Reuche	(Switzerland) Jean Deriaz	Peugeot 207 S2000
2010	ERC	(Italy) Luca Rossetti	(Italy) Matteo Chiarcossi	Abarth Grande Punto S2000
2009	ERC	(Switzerland) Grégoire Hotz	(Switzerland) Pietro Ravasi	Peugeot 207 S2000
2008	IRC, ERC (coeff. 10)	(Belgium) Freddy Loix	(Belgium) Robin Buysmans	Peugeot 207 S2000
2007	IRC, ERC (coeff. 10)	(France) Nicolas Vouilloz	(France) Nicolas Klinger	Peugeot 207 S2000
2006	ERC (coeff. 10)	(Switzerland) Olivier Burri	(France) Fabrice Gordon	Subaru Impreza WRX STI
2005	ERC (coeff. 10)	(Switzerland) Olivier Gillet	(Switzerland) Frédéric Helfer	Renault Clio S1600
