= Renato Travaglia =

Italian rally driver (born 1965)

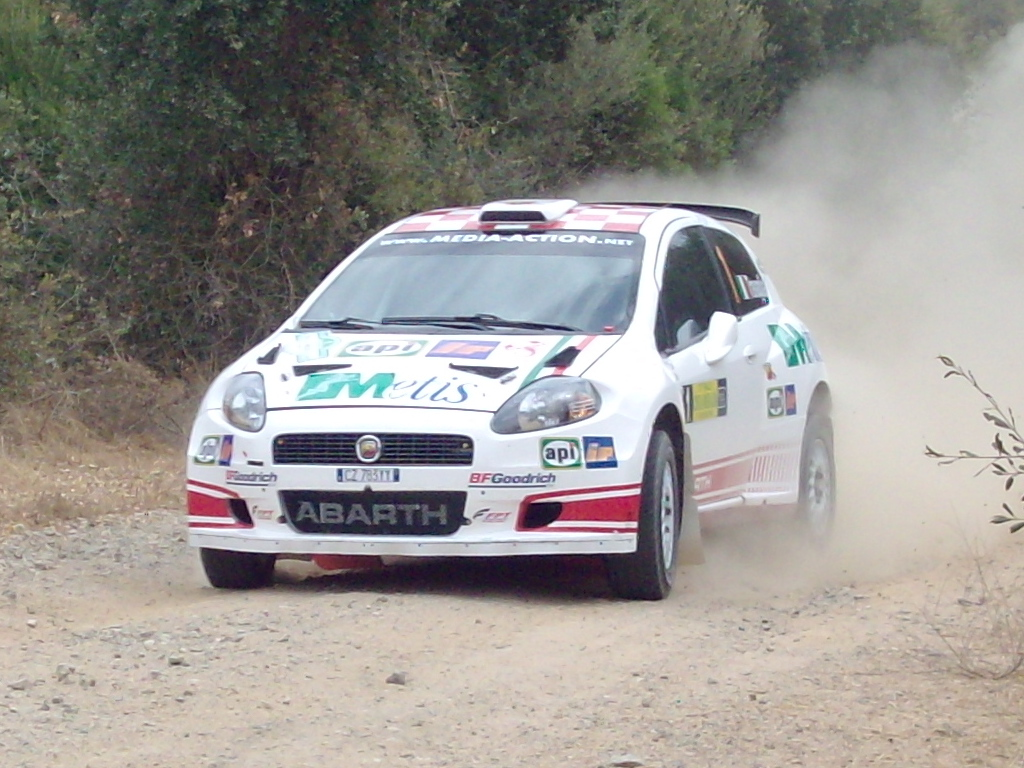
- Travaglia on Abarth Grande Punto S2000 at the 2008 Rally Costa Smeralda

Personal information
- Nationality: (Italy) Italian

World Rally Championship record
- Years active: 1991-2002
- Co-driver: (Italy) Emiliano Castioni (Italy) Alessandro Mari (Italy) Flavio Zanella
- Rallies: 13
- Championships: 0
- Rally wins: 0
- Podiums: 0
- Stage wins: 0
- Total points: 8
- First rally: 1991 Rallye Sanremo
- Last rally: 2002 Rallye Sanremo

Renato Travaglia (born October 26, 1965) is an Italian rally driver. He is best known for his success in the Italian and European rally championships, having won both in 2002 driving a Peugeot 206 WRC and the latter in 2005 driving a Super 1600 Renault Clio. Overall in his career he won 12 National and International Rally CChampionships. He also won the 1999 Monza Rally Show.

He has been a regular competitor in the Rallye Sanremo during the nineties and early noughties, which was at the time a round of the World Rally Championship; his best result was a fifth-place finish in 2001. He also competed in the Race of Champions, representing Italy in 2002 and 2003, reaching the final of the Nations' Cup in 2002 alongside Fabrizio Giovanardi and Marco Melandri but losing to the United States. He reached the quarter-finals of the main event in 2003, but lost to Gilles Panizzi.

His son Aronne Travaglia (b. 1994) races in Class 3000 SNORE and MORE Championships and he won both in 2015.

Sporting positions
Preceded by Armin Kremer	European Rally Champion; 2002	Succeeded by Bruno Thiry
Preceded by Simon Jean-Joseph	European Rally Champion; 2005	Succeeded by Giandomenico Basso
