= 2016 Czech Rally Championship =

2016 Czech Rally Championship season

Seasons
- ← 2015 2017 →

The 2016 Czech Rally Championship season was an international rally championship. The championship was contested by a combination of regulations with Group R competing directly against Super 2000 and WRC cars for points.

The championship began in Klatovy on 29 April and concluded in Příbram on 2 October. The championship was held over six events.

== Calendar ==
Round	Dates	Rally name	Surface
1	29–30 April	51. Rallye Šumava Klatovy 2016	Tarmac
2	27–28 May	44. Rallye Český Krumlov 2016	Tarmac
3	17–18 June	12. Agrotec Petronas Syntium Rally Hustopeče 2016	Tarmac
4	1–3 July	43. Rally Bohemia 2016	Tarmac
5	26–28 August	46. Barum Czech Rally Zlín 2016	Tarmac
6	30 September – 2 October	37. SVK Rally Příbram 2016	Tarmac

== Championship standings ==
The 2016 Czech Rally Championship for Drivers points was as follows:

Pos.	Driver	Vehicle	Team	ŠUM	KRU	HUS	BOH	BAR	PŘÍ	Total
1	(Czech Republic) Jan Kopecký	Škoda Fabia R5	Škoda Motorsport	1	1	1	1	1		324
2	(Czech Republic) Jan Černý	Škoda Fabia S2000; Škoda Fabia R5	Mogul Czech National Team	4	8	5	Ret	3	4	160
3	(Czech Republic) Vojtěch Štajf	Škoda Fabia R5	Klokočka Škoda Czech national team	Ret	5	4	4	7	3	139.5
4	(Czech Republic) Jan Dohnal	Ford Focus RS WRC '06		6	Ret	3	10		1	139
5	(Czech Republic) Václav Pech	Porsche 997 GT3 RS 3.8	EuroOil Invelt Czech National Team	5	Ret	Ret	2	Ret	2	129
6	(Czech Republic) Pavel Valoušek	Škoda Fabia R5	Energy Oil Motorsport	3		2		4		128.5
7	(Czech Republic) Martin Vlček	Škoda Fabia WRC; Ford Fiesta R5	Svarmetal Motorsport	11	6		3	6	5	99.5
8	(Sweden) Pontus Tidemand	Škoda Fabia R5	Škoda Motorsport	2	2					96
9	(Czech Republic) Miroslav Jakeš	Citroën DS3 R5; Škoda Fabia S2000	Gemini Clinic Rally Team; Kimi Racing	9	3		5	8		83.5
10	(Czech Republic) Roman Odložilík	Ford Fiesta R5	TRT Czech Rally Sport	7	4	33	Ret	9	Ret	74.5
