= 2017 Czech Rally Championship =

The 2017 Czech Rally Championship season was an international rally championship. The championship was contested by a combination of regulations with Group R competing directly against Super 2000 and WRC cars for points.

== Calendar ==
| Round | Dates | Rally name | Surface |
|---|---|---|---|
| 1 | 24-26 March | 36. Janča Valašská Rally 2017 | Tarmac |
| 2 | 21-22 April | 52. Rallye Šumava Klatovy 2017 | Tarmac |
| 3 | 19-20 May | 45. Rallye Český Krumlov 2017 | Tarmac |
| 4 | 16-17 June | 13. Agrotec Petronas Rally Hustopeče 2017 | Tarmac |
| 5 | 1-2 July | 44. Rally Bohemia 2017 | Tarmac |
| 6 | 25–27 August | 47. Barum Czech Rally Zlín 2017 | Tarmac |
| 7 | 6-8 October | 38. Rally Příbram 2017 | Tarmac |

== Teams and drivers ==
Entries
| Entrant | Car | Class | Drivers | Co-drivers | Rounds |
|---|---|---|---|---|---|
| (Czech Republic) Kimi Sport | Ford Fiesta R5 | R5 | (Czech Republic) Miroslav Jakeš | (Czech Republic) Marcela Ehlová | 1, 3 |
| (Czech Republic) A-Team | Ford Fiesta R5 | R5 | (Czech Republic) Miroslav Jakeš | (Czech Republic) Marcela Ehlová | 4-6 |
| (Czech Republic) A-Team | Ford Fiesta R5 | R5 | (Czech Republic) Tomáš Kurka | (Czech Republic) David Šmeidler | 4, 6 |
| (Czech Republic) TRT Czech Rally Sport | Ford Fiesta R5 | R5 | (Czech Republic) Roman Odložilík | (Czech Republic) Martin Tureček | All |
| (Czech Republic) EuroOil Invelt Czech National Team | Ford Fiesta R5 | R5 | (Czech Republic) Václav Pech | (Czech Republic) Petr Uhel | All |
| (Czech Republic) GK Forge Metkom Rally Team | Ford Fiesta R5 | R5 | (Poland) Jarosław Szeja | (Poland) Marcin Szeja | All |
| (Czech Republic) Svarmetal Motorsport | Ford Fiesta R5 | R5 | (Czech Republic) Martin Vlček | (Czech Republic) Jindřiška Žáková | All |
| (Czech Republic) Icari Rally Team | Ford Fiesta R5 | R5 | (Czech Republic) Ondřej Bisaha | (Czech Republic) Jiří Hovorka | 3 |
| (Czech Republic) Icari Rally Team | Ford Fiesta R5 | R5 | (Czech Republic) Ondřej Bisaha | (Czech Republic) Ondřej Krajča | 6 |
| (Czech Republic) Icari Rally Team | Ford Fiesta R5 | R5 | (Czech Republic) Pavel Valoušek | (Czech Republic) Veronika Havelková | 4 |
| (Czech Republic) Icari Rally Team | Škoda Fabia R5 | R5 | (Czech Republic) Pavel Valoušek | (Czech Republic) Veronika Havelková | 6 |
| (Czech Republic) Škoda Motorsport | Škoda Fabia R5 | R5 | (Czech Republic) Jan Kopecký | (Czech Republic) Pavel Dresler | 1-6 |
| (Czech Republic) Škoda Motorsport | Škoda Fabia R5 | R5 | (Sweden) Pontus Tidemand | (Sweden) Jonas Andersson | 4 |
| (Czech Republic) Racing 21 | Škoda Fabia R5 | R5 | (Czech Republic) Daniel Landa | (Czech Republic) Julius Gál | 1 |
| (Czech Republic) Spirit Racing | Škoda Fabia R5 | R5 | (Czech Republic) Daniel Landa | (Czech Republic) Pavel Zalabák | 2-6 |
| (Czech Republic) Klokočka Škoda Czech national team | Škoda Fabia R5 | R5 | (Czech Republic) Vojtěch Štajf | (Czech Republic) František Rajnoha | 1-4 |
| (Czech Republic) Klokočka Škoda Czech national team | Škoda Fabia R5 | R5 | (Czech Republic) Vojtěch Štajf | (Czech Republic) Markéta Skácelová | 5-7 |
| (Czech Republic) Mogul Škoda ACA Racing | Škoda Fabia R5 | R5 | (Czech Republic) Jan Černý | (Czech Republic) Petr Černohorský, jr. | 1-3 |
| (Czech Republic) Tlusťák Racing | Škoda Fabia R5 | R5 | (Czech Republic) Antonín Tlusťák | (Czech Republic) Ivo Vybíral | 1, 6 |
| (Czech Republic) Korno Motorsport | Škoda Fabia R5 | R5 | (Czech Republic) Karel Trojan | (Czech Republic) Petr Chlup | 1-3 |
| (Czech Republic) Jan Sýkora | Škoda Fabia R5 | R5 | (Czech Republic) Jan Sýkora | (Czech Republic) Štěpán Palivec | 2, 5 |
| (Czech Republic) Zdeněk Pokorný | Škoda Fabia R5 | R5 | (Czech Republic) Zdeněk Pokorný | (Czech Republic) Richard Lasevič | 4 |
| (Czech Republic) Mogul Racing Team | Škoda Fabia R5 | R5 | (Czech Republic) Roman Kresta | (Czech Republic) Petr Starý | 5-6 |
| (Czech Republic) Jiří Tošovský | Škoda Fabia R5 | R5 | (Czech Republic) Jiří Tošovský | (Czech Republic) Tomáš Plachý | 5 |
| (Austria) BRR Baumschlager Rallye & Racing Team | Škoda Fabia R5 | R5 | (Czech Republic) Tomáš Kostka | (Czech Republic) Ladislav Kučera | 6 |
| (Czech Republic) Jaromír Tarabus | Škoda Fabia S2000 | S2000 | (Czech Republic) Jaromír Tarabus | (Czech Republic) Petr Machů | All |
| (Czech Republic) Daniel Zpěvák | Škoda Fabia S2000 | S2000 | (Czech Republic) Daniel Zpěvák | (Czech Republic) Jan Kubala | 4, 6 |
| (Czech Republic) David Tomek | Škoda Fabia S2000 | S2000 | (Czech Republic) David Tomek | (Czech Republic) Marek Zeman | 5, 7 |
| (Czech Republic) Lukáš Pondělíček | Škoda Fabia S2000 | S2000 | (Czech Republic) Lukáš Pondělíček | (Czech Republic) Eduard Perski | 7 |
| (Czech Republic) Jan Dohnal | Ford Focus RS WRC '06 | WRC | (Czech Republic) Jan Dohnal | (Czech Republic) Michal Ernst | 1-3 |
| (Czech Republic) Walašský Rally Klub | Škoda Octavia WRC Evo3 | WRC | (Czech Republic) Silvestr Mikuláštík | (Slovakia) Lukáš Šintal | 1 |
| (Czech Republic) Karel Trněný | Škoda Fabia WRC | WRC | (Czech Republic) Karel Trněný | (Czech Republic) Václav Pritzl | 1-2, 4, 7 |
| (Czech Republic) XTG Motorsport Klub | Škoda Fabia WRC | WRC | (Czech Republic) Marian Šín | (Czech Republic) Jiří Kulštejn | 7 |
| (Czech Republic) Štěpán Vojtěch | Peugeot 206 WRC | WRC | (Czech Republic) Štěpán Vojtěch | (Czech Republic) Michal Ernst | 5 |

== Czech Rally Championship ==
| Pos. | Driver | Car | VAL | ŠUM | KRU | HUS | BOH | BAR | PŘÍ | Points |
|---|---|---|---|---|---|---|---|---|---|---|
| 1 | (Czech Republic) Jan Kopecký | Škoda Fabia R5 | 1 | 1 | 1 | 1 | 1 | 1 | | 330 |
| 2 | (Czech Republic) Václav Pech | Ford Fiesta R5 | 2 | 2 | 2 | 2 | 2 | Ret | 2 | 232 |
| 3 | (Czech Republic) Jan Černý | Škoda Fabia R5 | 3 | 3 | 4 | | 3 | 6 | | 173 |
| 4 | (Czech Republic) Jan Dohnal | Ford Focus RS WRC '06 | 4 | 5 | 6 | 6 | Ret | | 1 | 164 |
| 5 | (Poland) Jarosław Szeja | Ford Fiesta R5 | 7 | 4 | 7 | 8 | 4 | Ret | 7 | 120 |
| 6 | (Czech Republic) Miroslav Jakeš | Ford Fiesta R5 | Ret | | 3 | 3 | 6 | 43 | | 102 |
| 7 | (Czech Republic) Roman Kresta | Škoda Fabia R5 | | | | | 5 | 2 | | 99 |
| 8 | (Czech Republic) Jaromír Tarabus | Škoda Fabia S2000 | 9 | 6 | 8 | 9 | 9 | 7 | 4 | 92,5 |
| 9 | (Czech Republic) Vojtěch Štajf | Škoda Fabia R5 | 10 | 8 | 5 | Ret | 8 | Ret | 3 | 92 |
| 10 | (Czech Republic) Roman Odložilík | Ford Fiesta R5 | 5 | Ret | Ret | 7 | Ret | 5 | Ret | 78 |
| 11 | (Czech Republic) Pavel Valoušek | Ford Fiesta R5; Škoda Fabia R5 | | | | 4 | | 4 | | 75 |
| Pos. | Driver | Car | VAL | ŠUM | KRU | HUS | BOH | BAR | PŘÍ | Points |
