= Czech Rally Championship =

Automotive race in Czechia

- Country: Czech Republic
- Inaugural season: 1994
- Drivers' champion: (Czech Republic) Jan Kopecký

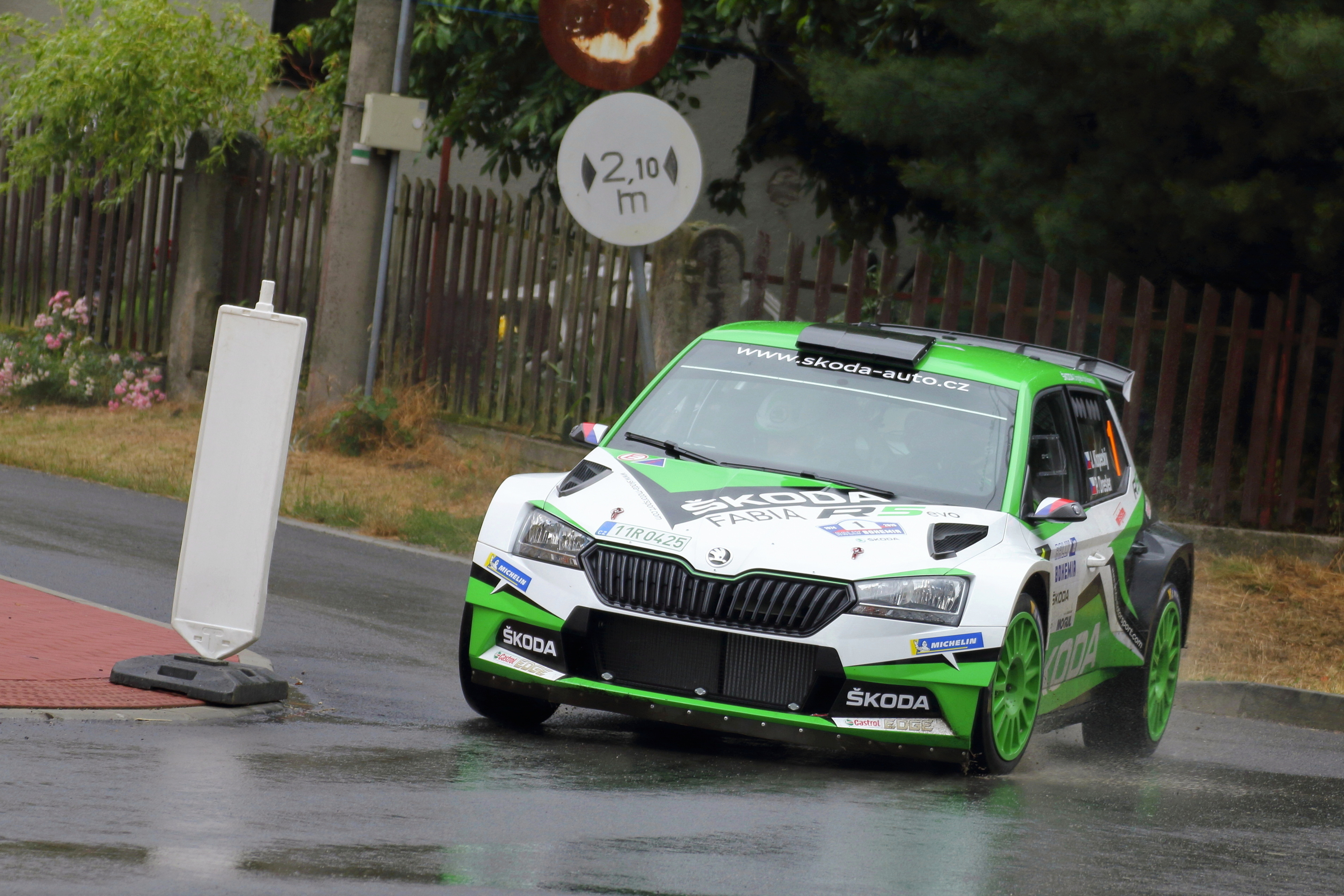
2019 Rally Bohemia

The Czech Rally Championship is a rallying series based in the Czech Republic. The first championship was run in 1994.

== Czech Rally Championship ==
=== Champions ===
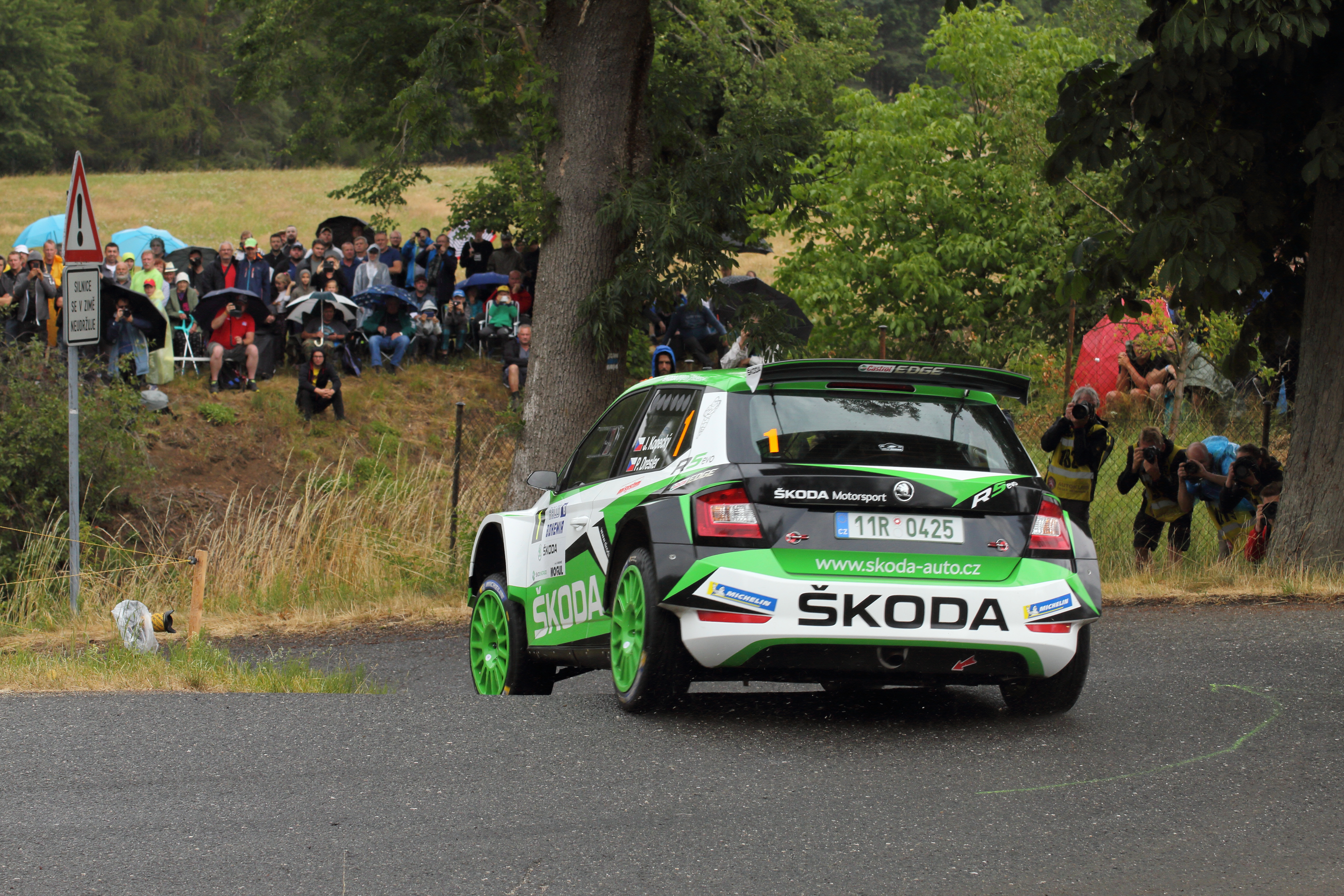
Jan Kopecký at the 2019 Rally Bohemia

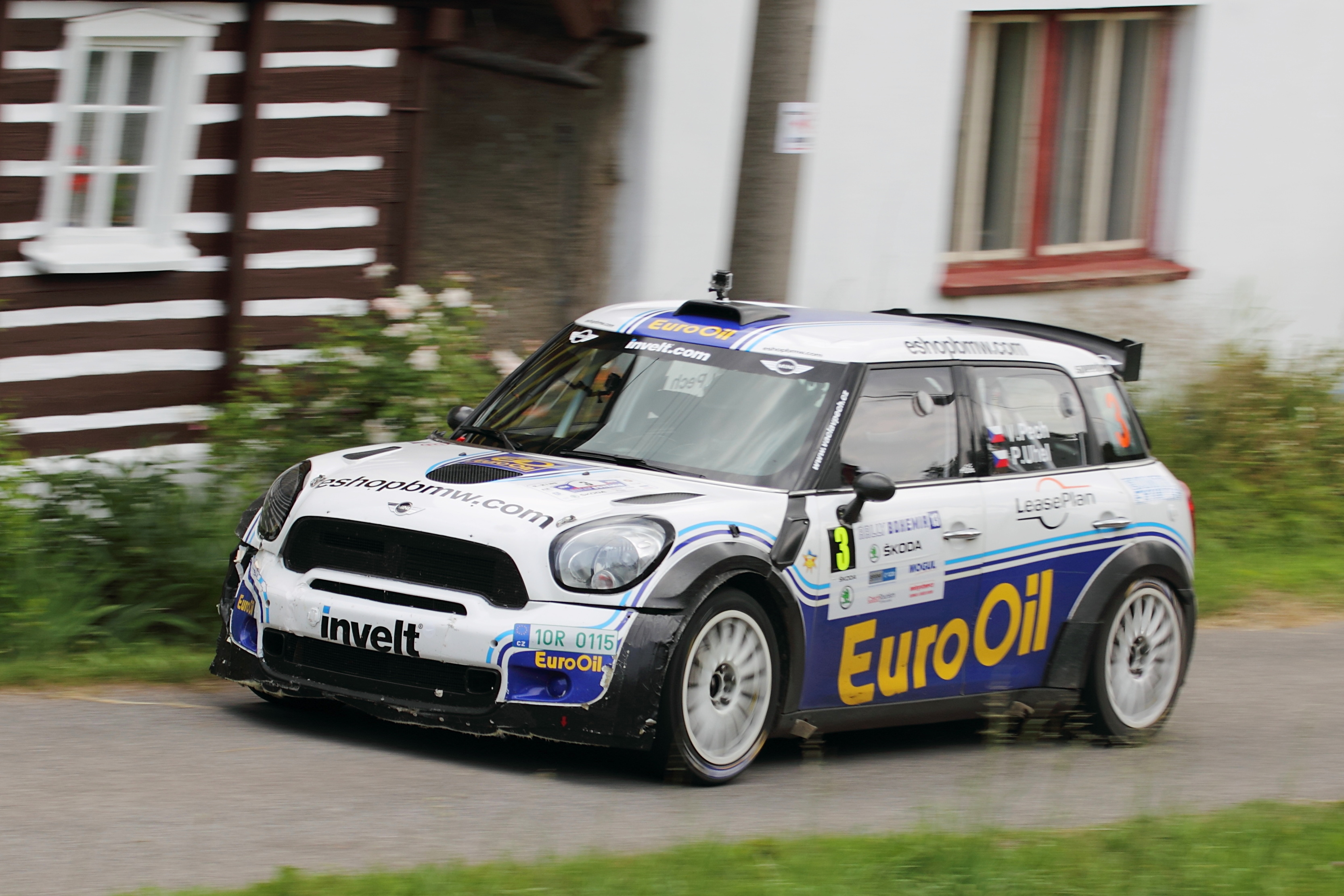
Václav Pech in 2013

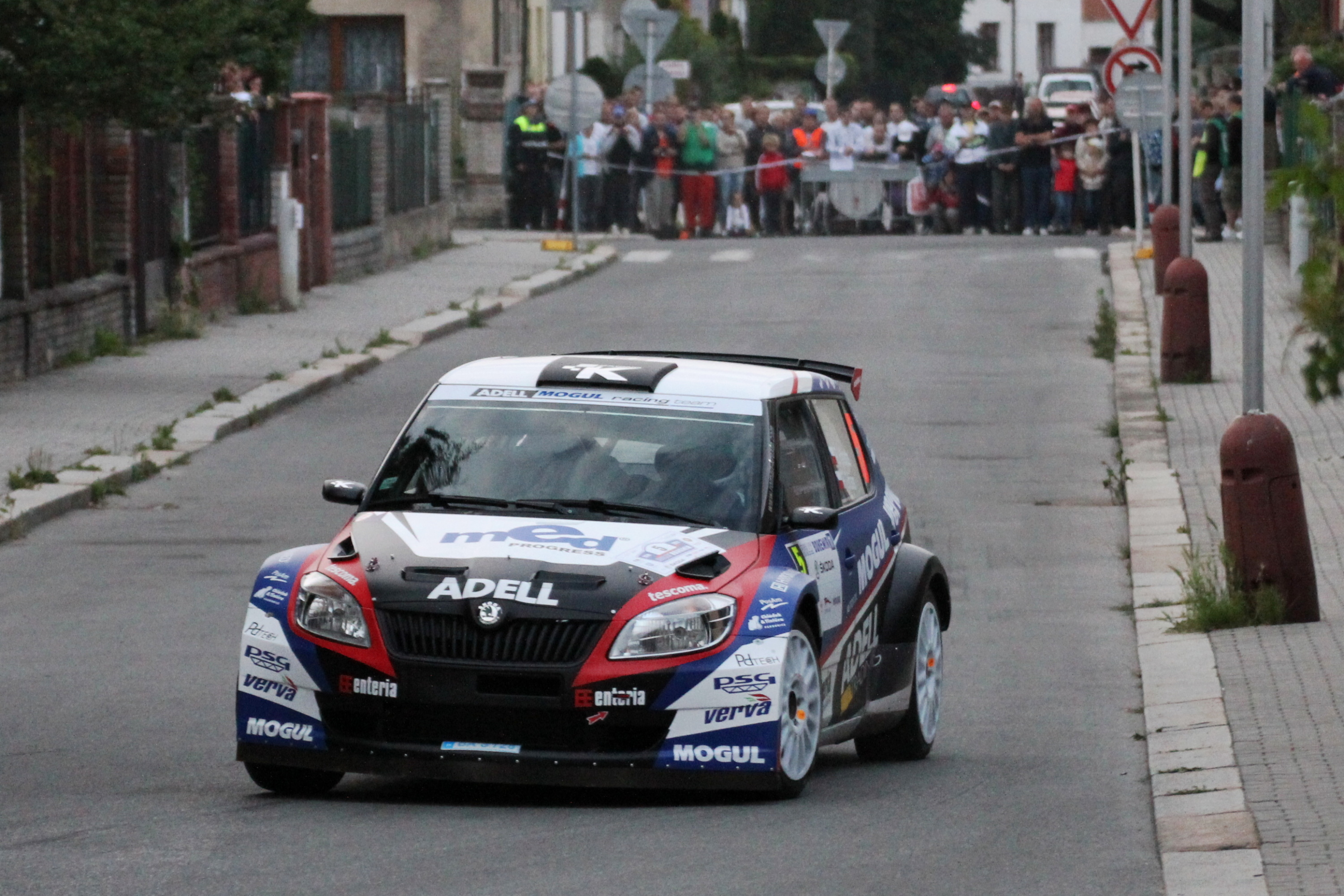
Roman Kresta in 2011

Season	Champion	Co-Driver	Car	Team
2023	(Czech Republic) Jan Kopecký	(Czech Republic) Jan Hloušek	Škoda Fabia RS Rally2	Agrotec Škoda Rally Team
2022	(Czech Republic) Jan Kopecký	(Czech Republic) Jan Hloušek	Škoda Fabia Rally2 evo	Agrotec Škoda Rally Team
2021	(Czech Republic) Jan Kopecký	(Czech Republic) Jan Hloušek	Škoda Fabia Rally2 evo	Agrotec Škoda Rally Team
2020	(Czech Republic) Václav Pech	(Czech Republic) Petr Uhel	Ford Focus RS WRC 06	EuroOil Team
2019	(Czech Republic) Jan Kopecký	(Czech Republic) Pavel Dresler	Škoda Fabia R5; Škoda Fabia R5 evo	Škoda Motorsport
2018	(Czech Republic) Jan Kopecký	(Czech Republic) Pavel Dresler	Škoda Fabia R5	Škoda Motorsport
2017	(Czech Republic) Jan Kopecký	(Czech Republic) Pavel Dresler	Škoda Fabia R5	Škoda Motorsport
2016	(Czech Republic) Jan Kopecký	(Czech Republic) Pavel Dresler	Škoda Fabia R5	Škoda Motorsport
2015	(Czech Republic) Jan Kopecký	(Czech Republic) Pavel Dresler	Škoda Fabia R5	Škoda Motorsport
2014	(Czech Republic) Václav Pech	(Czech Republic) Petr Uhel	Mini Cooper S2000 1.6T	EuroOil Invelt Team
2013	(Czech Republic) Václav Pech	(Czech Republic) Petr Uhel	Mini Cooper S2000 1.6T	EuroOil Invelt Team
2012	(Czech Republic) Jan Kopecký	(Czech Republic) Pavel Dresler	Škoda Fabia S2000	Škoda Motorsport
2011	(Czech Republic) Roman Kresta	(Czech Republic) Petr Gross	Škoda Fabia S2000	Adell Mogul Rally Team
2010	(Czech Republic) Pavel Valoušek	(Czech Republic) Zdeněk Hrůza	Škoda Fabia S2000	Škoda Delimax Czech National Team
2009	(Czech Republic) Roman Kresta	(Czech Republic) Petr Gross	Peugeot 207 S2000	Mogul Rally Team
2008	(Czech Republic) Roman Kresta	(Czech Republic) Petr Gross	Mitsubishi Lancer Evo IX	Mogul Rally Team
2007	(Czech Republic) Václav Pech	(Czech Republic) Petr Uhel	Mitsubishi Lancer Evo IX	EuroOil Čepro Czech National Team
2006	(Czech Republic) Václav Pech	(Czech Republic) Petr Uhel	Mitsubishi Lancer Evo IX	Czech National Team
2005	(Czech Republic) Václav Pech	(Czech Republic) Petr Uhel	Ford Focus RS WRC '02	Euro Oil Team
2004	(Czech Republic) Jan Kopecký	(Czech Republic) Filip Schovánek	Škoda Fabia WRC	Škoda Matador Team
2003	(Czech Republic) Václav Pech	(Czech Republic) Petr Uhel	Ford Focus RS WRC '02	Czech National Eurooil Team
2002	(Czech Republic) Václav Pech	(Czech Republic) Petr Uhel	Ford Focus RS WRC '01	Barum Rally Team
2001	(Czech Republic) Roman Kresta	(Czech Republic) Jan Tománek	Škoda Octavia WRC	Škoda Benzina Team
2000	(Czech Republic) Roman Kresta	(Czech Republic) Jan Tománek	Škoda Octavia WRC	Škoda Motorsport
1999	(Czech Republic) Ladislav Křeček	(Czech Republic) Jan Krečman	Ford Escort RS Cosworth	Benzina Mogul Team
1998	(Czech Republic) Ladislav Křeček	(Czech Republic) Jan Krečman	Ford Escort RS Cosworth	Benzina Mogul Team
1997	(Czech Republic) Milan Dolák	(Czech Republic) Jaroslav Palivec	Toyota Celica GT-Four	HRS Team
1996	(Czech Republic) Ladislav Křeček	(Czech Republic) Jan Krečman	Ford Escort RS Cosworth	Benzina Mogul Team
1995	(Italy) Enrico Bertone	(Italy) Massimo Chiapponi	Toyota Celica Turbo 4WD	CW Sport Zlín
1994	(Italy) Piergiorgio Deila	(Italy) Pierangelo Scalvini	Lancia Delta HF Integrale	V.I.P Motorsport

=== Multiple wins by individual ===
	Name	Titles	Winning years
(Czech Republic)	Jan Kopecký	10	2004, 2012, 2015, 2016, 2017, 2018, 2019, 2021, 2022, 2023
(Czech Republic)	Václav Pech	8	2002, 2003, 2005, 2006, 2007, 2013, 2014, 2020
(Czech Republic)	Roman Kresta	5	2000, 2001, 2008, 2009, 2011
(Czech Republic)	Ladislav Křeček	3	1996, 1998, 1999

=== Multiple wins by car manufacturer ===
	Name	Titles	Winning years
(Czech Republic)	Škoda Auto	14	2000, 2001, 2004, 2010, 2011, 2012, 2015, 2016, 2017, 2018, 2019, 2021, 2022, 2023
(United States)	Ford	7	1996, 1998, 1999, 2002, 2003, 2005, 2020
(Japan)	Mitsubishi Motors	3	2006, 2007, 2008
(Japan)	Toyota	2	1995, 1997
(United Kingdom)	Mini	2	2013, 2014

== Czech Sprintrally Championship ==
Season	Champion	Co-Driver	Car	Team
2018	(Czech Republic) Petr Semerád	(Czech Republic) Petr Těšínský (Czech Republic) Jiří Hlávka	Peugeot 208 R2; Opel Adam R2	- Hájek Rally Team
2017	(Czech Republic) Egon Smékal	(Czech Republic) Petra Němcová	Citroën DS3 R3T Max	Egon Smékal Bens Racing Team
2016	(Czech Republic) Patrik Rujbr	(Czech Republic) Veronika Římalová	Renault Clio R3T	TNT Počernice
2015	(Czech Republic) Ondřej Bisaha	(Czech Republic) Petr Píža	Citroën DS3 R3T Max	-
2014	(Czech Republic) Jaromír Tomaštík	(Slovakia) Róbert Baran	Subaru Impreza WRC '06	JT Říha Group Rally Team
2013	(Czech Republic) Roman Odložilík	(Czech Republic) Martin Tureček	Škoda Fabia S2000	TRT Czech Rally Sport
2012	(Czech Republic) Tomáš Kostka	(Czech Republic) Miroslav Houšť	Citroën C4 WRC	Regionsport
2011	(Czech Republic) Pavel Valoušek	(Czech Republic) Zdeněk Hrůza	Škoda Fabia WRC	Delimax Czech National Team
2010	(Czech Republic) Roman Kresta	(Czech Republic) Tomáš Kašpárek	Mitsubishi Lancer Evo IX	Enteria Rally Team
2009	(Czech Republic) Jaroslav Orsák	(Czech Republic) Karel Vajík	Mitsubishi Lancer Evo IX	Seznam.cz Rally Team
2008	(Czech Republic) Josef Peták	(Czech Republic) Libor Joska	Peugeot 207 S2000	Hroch Rally Team v AČR
2007	(Czech Republic) Karel Trněný	(Czech Republic) Jiří Kulhan	Škoda Octavia WRC	Hroch Rally Team v AČR
2006	(Czech Republic) Josef Semerád	(Czech Republic) Bohuslav Ceplecha	Mitsubishi Lancer Evo IX	Czech National Mitsubishi RT
2005	(Czech Republic) Václav Pech	(Czech Republic) Petr Uhel	Ford Focus RS WRC '02	Euro Oil Team
2004	(Czech Republic) Václav Pech	(Czech Republic) Petr Uhel	Ford Focus RS WRC '02	Euro Oil Team
2003	(Czech Republic) Štěpán Vojtěch	(Czech Republic) Michal Ernst	Toyota Corolla WRC	JM Racing
2002	(Czech Republic) Stanislav Chovanec	(Czech Republic) Karel Holaň	Škoda Octavia WRC	-
2001	(Czech Republic) Tomáš Hrdinka	(Czech Republic) Petr Gross	Subaru Impreza WRC '00	Styllex Tuning Prosport
2000	(Czech Republic) Emil Triner	(Czech Republic) Miloš Hůlka	Nissan Pulsar GTi-R	Roto Plzeň

=== Multiple wins by individual ===
	Name	Titles	Winning years
(Czech Republic)	Václav Pech	2	2004, 2005

=== Multiple wins by car manufacturer ===
	Name	Titles	Winning years
(Czech Republic)	Škoda Auto	4	2002, 2007, 2011, 2013
(Japan)	Mitsubishi Motors	3	2006, 2009, 2010
(France)	Citroën	3	2012, 2015, 2017
(Japan)	Subaru	2	2001, 2014
(United States)	Ford	2	2004, 2005
