= Škoda Motorsport =

Auto racing factory team by Škoda

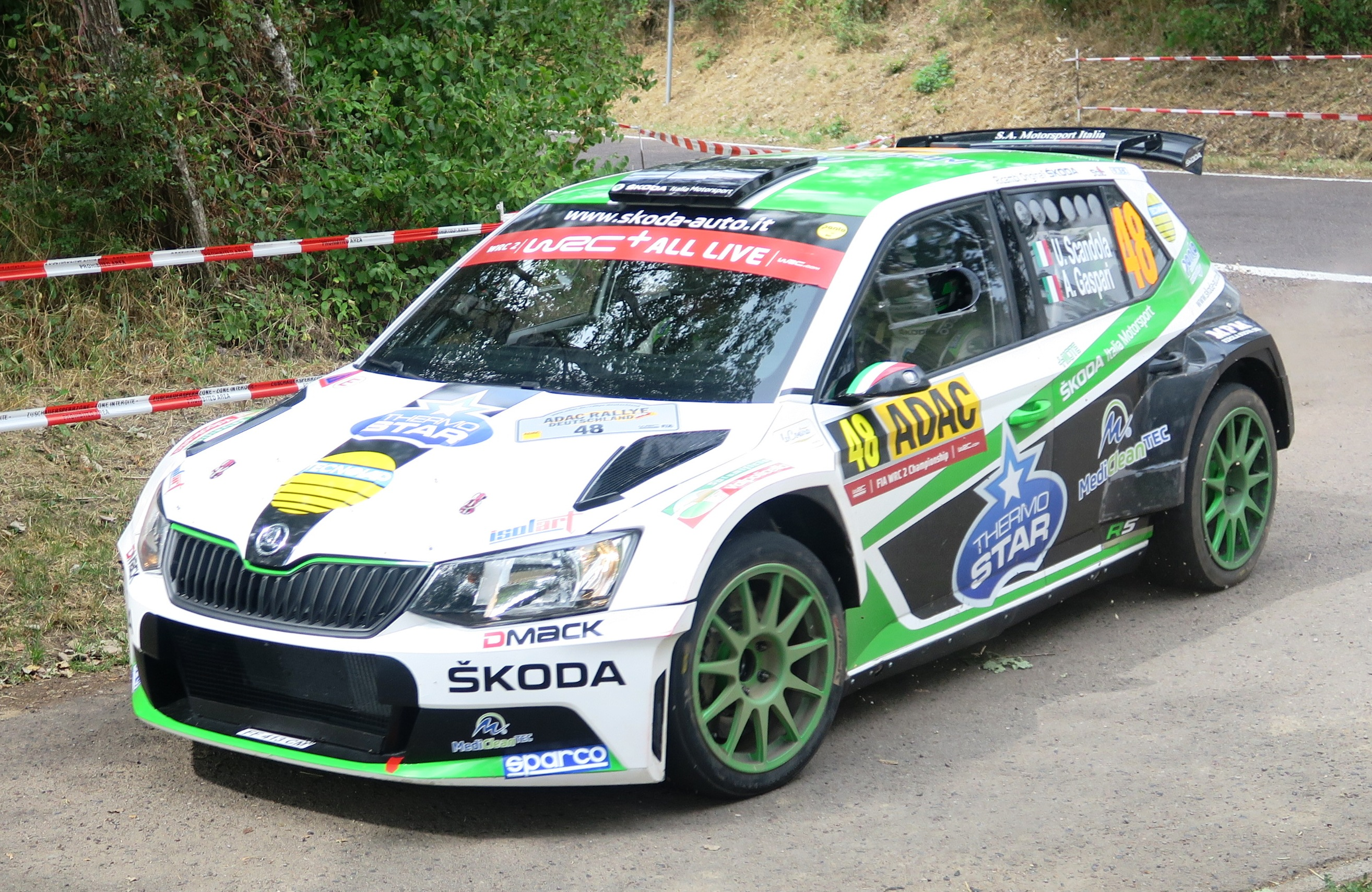
- Full name: Škoda Motorsport
- Base: Plazy, Czech Republic
- Team principal(s): Michal Hrabánek
- Chassis: Škoda Fabia RS Rally2

Škoda Motorsport is the sports factory team of the car manufacturer Škoda Auto, currently focusing on the development and construction of racing cars. The latest model from Škoda Motorsport's workshops is the Škoda Fabia RS Rally2, which was introduced on 14 June 2022 and is set to follow in the footsteps of its successful predecessor, the Škoda Fabia Rally2 evo, unveiled in 2019. During the factory team's existence, they have managed to secure five championship titles in the FIA World Rally Championship WRC2 category in the manufacturers' standings.

More than one hundred and fifty private teams from around the world also achieve success with the Škoda racing cars. Customer teams annually claim titles not only in national and continental championships but also secure leading positions in the FIA World Rally Championship.

In 2021, Škoda Motorsport celebrated its 120th anniversary since its first involvement in motorsport, confirming its integral part in Škoda Auto's DNA. In the 2022 season, the Škoda Motorsport team continued its successful collaboration with the customer team Toksport WRT, providing them support in the FIA World Rally Championship (WRC2 category).

== History ==
=== 1901–1902 ===
At the start of the Paris - Berlin race, there were 110 participants in 4 categories. One of these categories was for motorcycles and motor tricycles, which saw a total of 10 riders, including Narcis Podsedníček, a mechanic and workshop master at the former factory in Mladá Boleslav. After several days, Podsedníček arrived in Berlin on his motorcycle from Paris. According to some sources, he was the only motorcyclist to complete the race, but only after the official end of the competition. This remarkable achievement by Podsedníček influenced the future racing activities of the brand.

The successes continued in 1902 when Klement won the first prize and Podsedníček took second place on a 4.2 km track in the race on Exelberg hill in the Austro-Hungarian territory. However, these victories did not hold much value as they were the only two riders who participated in this particular race category.

=== 1905–1935 ===
In 1905, a new era began as the Mladá Boleslav car manufacturer definitively ended its official participation in motorcycle races and shifted its focus to car racing. Their first car was the two-seater Voituretta A with a two-cylinder liquid-cooled V engine, priced at 3600 crowns. In 1907, Ing. Otto Hieronimus, an outstanding designer and European-level racer, joined the company. His engagement raised the competitive spirit in the factory, and in 1908, the brand celebrated its first success in the Zbraslav Jíloviště hill climb race, with the brand appearing on the results list in various categories, securing six first, five second, and one third place.

Another triumph for L&K (Laurin & Klement, the previous name of ŠKODA) came in the Semmering hill climb race in 1908, which was won by the aforementioned Otto Hieronimus. In 1912, the Alpine Ride competition was announced, stating that the automaker whose car would win three consecutive annual races without incurring penalty points would be awarded a perpetual trophy. The Mladá Boleslav car manufacturer participated in five races and won all of them, with Kolowrat behind the wheel in three of those victories.

Due to financial difficulties faced by the car manufacturer after the end of World War I, the year 1925 marked the merger of L&K with the Plzeň-based Škoda Works. This merger marked the beginning of modernizing production technologies. In 1935, the company participated in the 1000 Miles of Czechoslovakia race with the racing car ŠKODA Rapid Six, and the crew Komár - Houšť was awarded the prize for third place in their class.

=== 1936–1968 ===
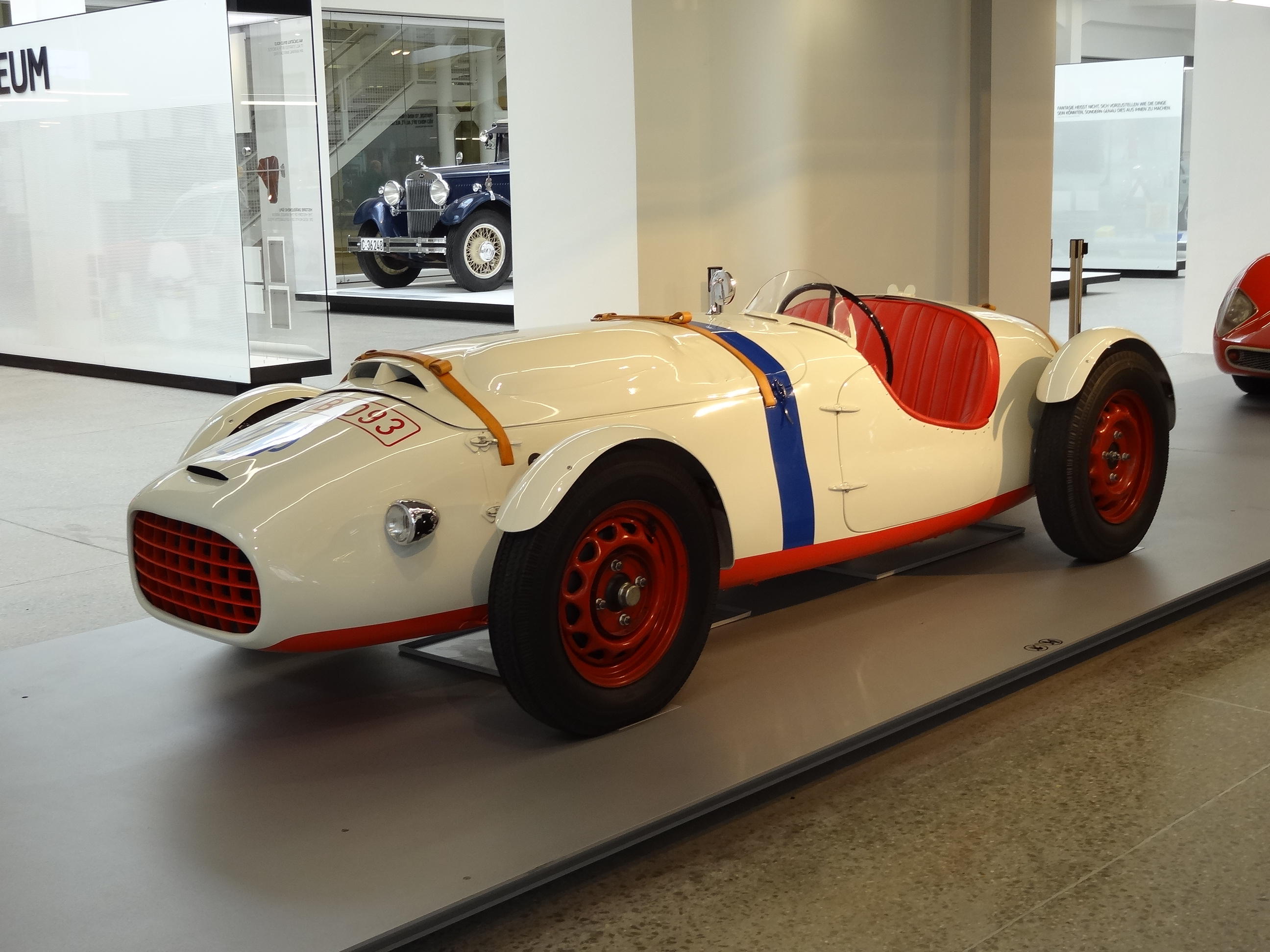
Škoda 966 Supersport

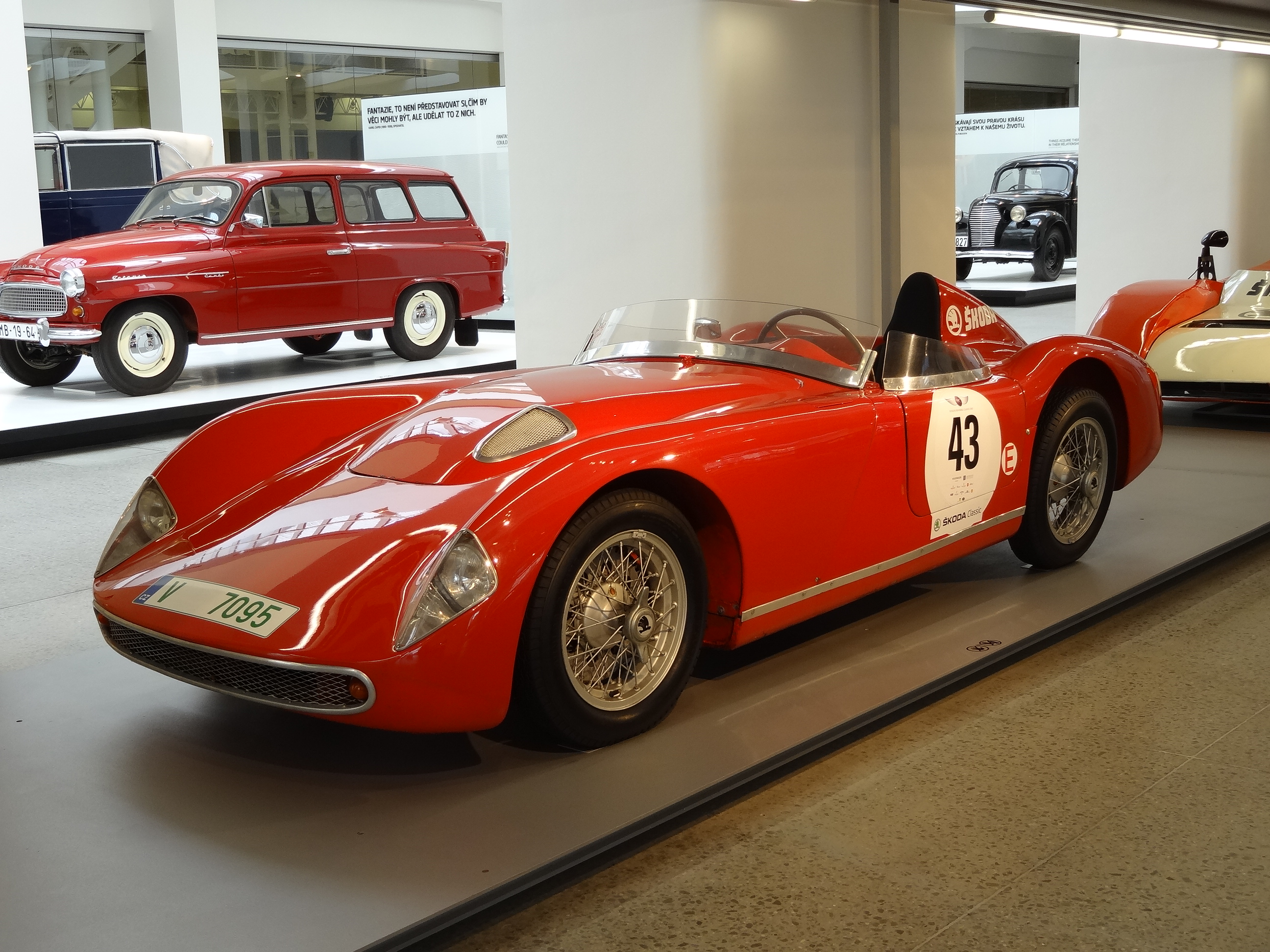
Škoda 1100 OHC (type 968)

The aforementioned success of the duo Komár - Houšť resulted in the motivation to create the Škoda Popular Sport roadster with a rear axle and a more powerful engine from the larger Rapid model for the Monte Carlo Rally in 1936. The crew Zdeněk Pohl - Jaroslav Hausman achieved 2nd place in the under 1500 cc class and 20th place overall. This achievement ignited enthusiasm for rallying among spectators and fans. The company quickly responded by presenting the sporty model Škoda Popular Sport Monte Carlo.

After World War II, the car manufacturer continued its sports activities and in 1946, they constructed the Škoda 1101, later referred to as the 'Tudor,' an open two-seater sports car that won the 1000 miles of Montevideo race in 1948. The crew Bobek - Netušil participated in the 24 Hours of Le Mans race in 1950 with the Škoda 1101 Sport.

In 1959, the Škoda Octavia model was introduced, and a year later, its sports version Octavia Touring Sport was released. In 1961, the crew Keinänen - Eklund took part in the prestigious Rallye Monte Carlo with this model and finished sixth overall, winning their class.

The new era in the history of Škoda began in the early 1960s when the Škoda 1000 MB was launched in 1964, featuring rear-wheel drive and a rear-engine layout. Additionally, a single-seater car (monopost) for circuits was developed based on the Škoda 1000 MB, and in 1968, Miroslav Fousek won the Eastern European Formula 3 Championship with it.

=== 1970–1981 ===
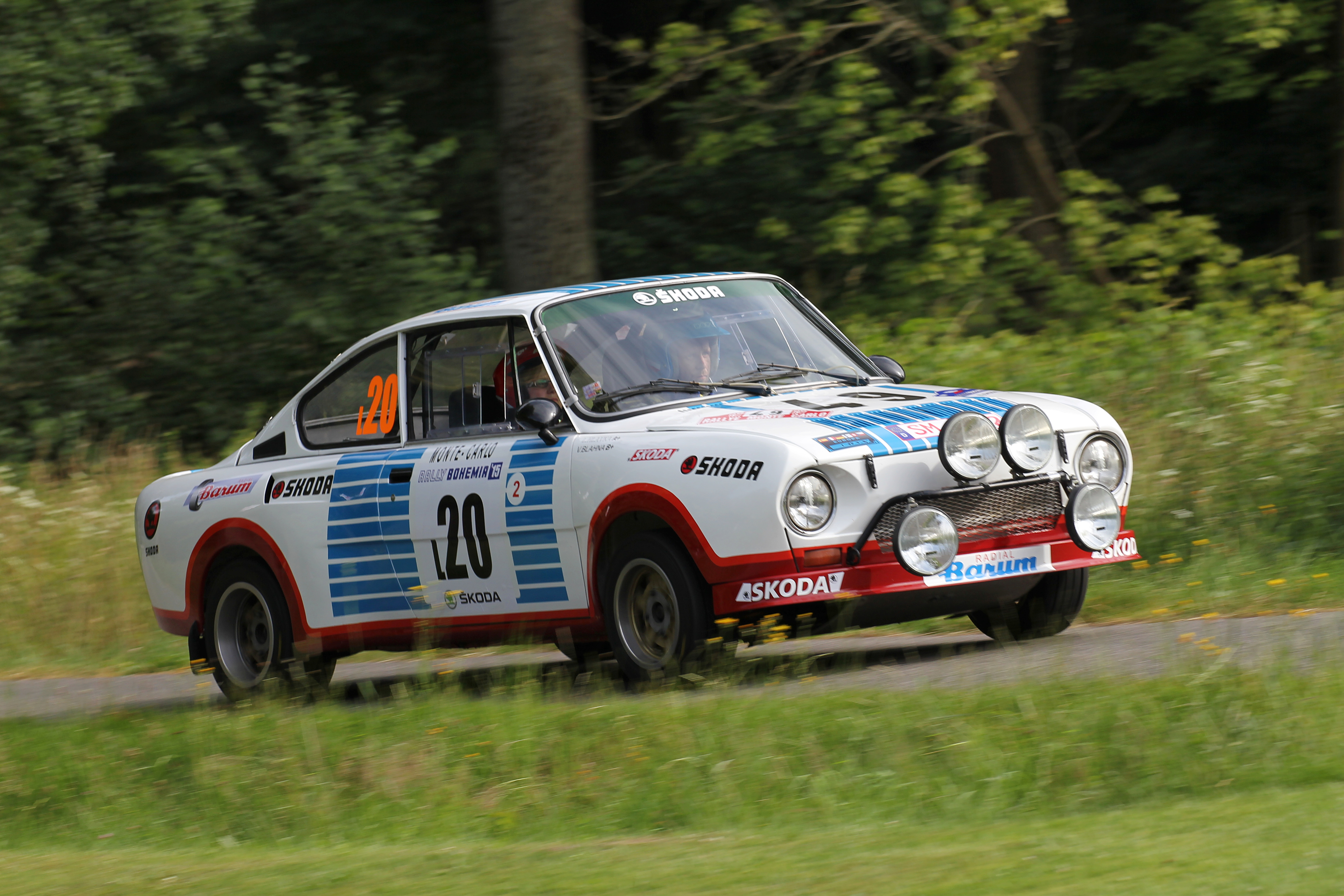
Škoda 130 RS

In 1970, the special racing car, Škoda 1500 OHC B5, designed for circuit and hill climb races in the B5 category, was introduced. In 1974, Škoda first used the abbreviation 'RS.' The Škoda 200 RS racing car is considered the original RS model of the Škoda brand. Its development was driven by the desire to compete in the top category of rallying.

In 1975, the ŠKODA 130 RS was unveiled, based on the sports coupe Škoda 110 R. The Škoda 130 RS earned the nickname 'Porsche of the East' and was the most successful car of its time and in its class.

In 1977, the crews Blahna - Hlávka and Zapadlo - Motal participated in the Rallye Monte Carlo. The Blahna - Hlávka crew finished first in the under 1300cc class, and the Zapadlo - Motal crew, with the same car, came in second. Out of a total of 198 crews at the start, only 45 reached the finish, among them were two Škoda 130 RS cars.

The successes continued in 1981 when the drivers Zdeněk Vojtěch - Břetislav Enge - Šenkýř - Bervid, typically using two Škoda 130 RS cars, won six out of eight races and secured the European Touring Car Championship (ETCC) title for the Škoda brand.

=== 1991–2008 ===
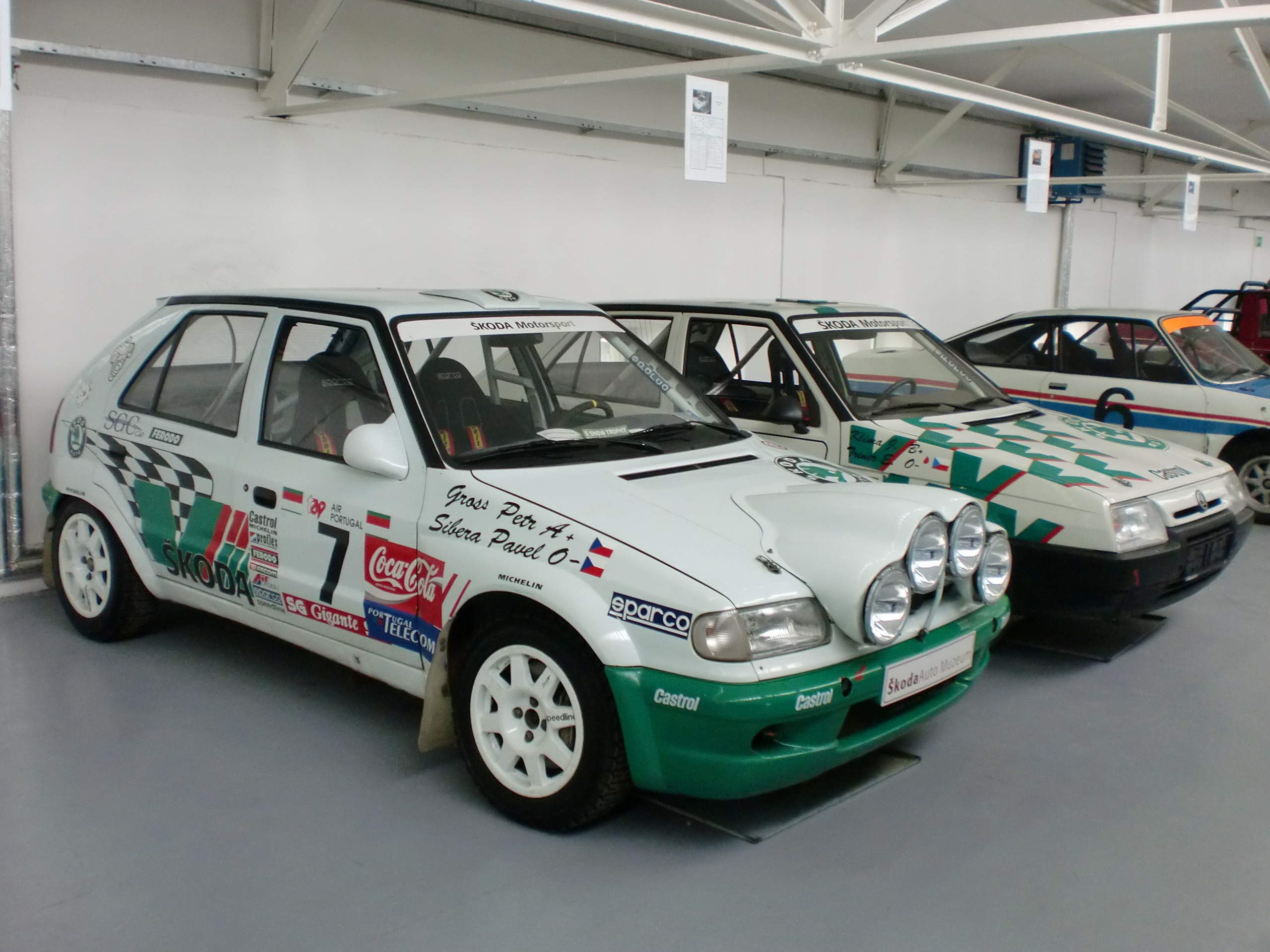
Škoda Felicia Kit Car and Škoda Favorit 136 L/A Rallye in Škoda Auto Museum

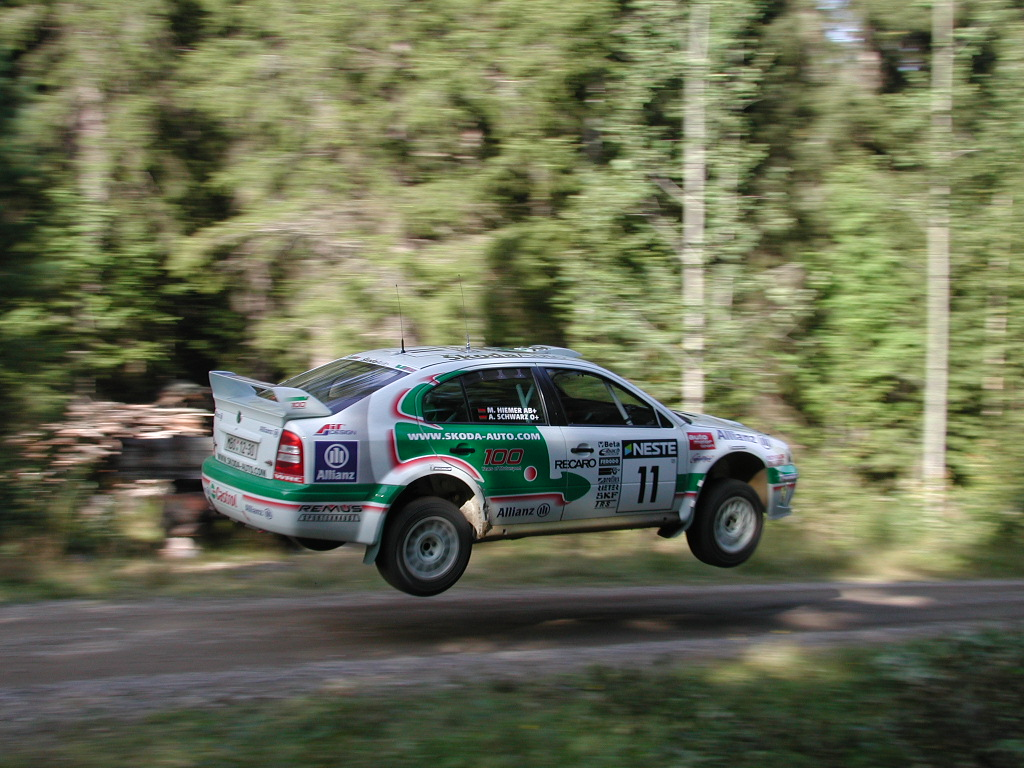
Armin Schwarz driving Škoda Octavia WRC on the 2001 Rally Finland

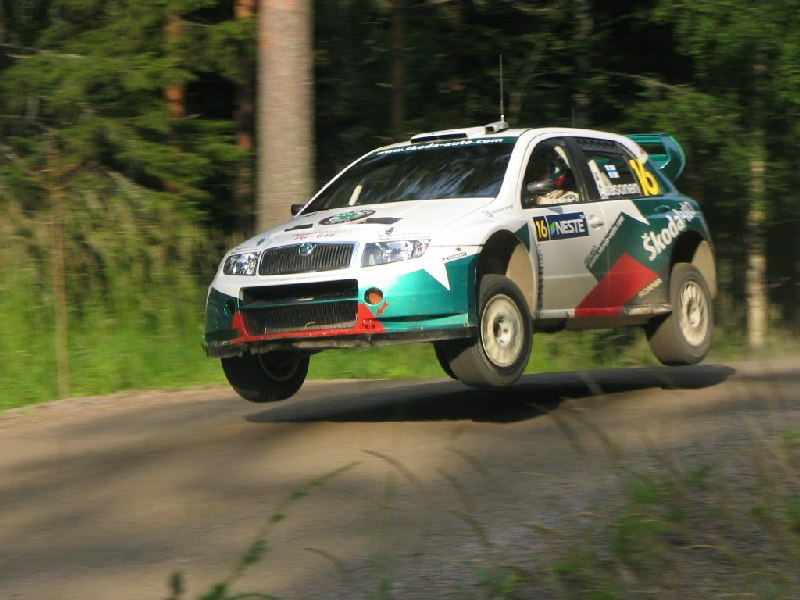
Jani Paasonen driving Škoda Fabia WRC on 2004 Rally Finland

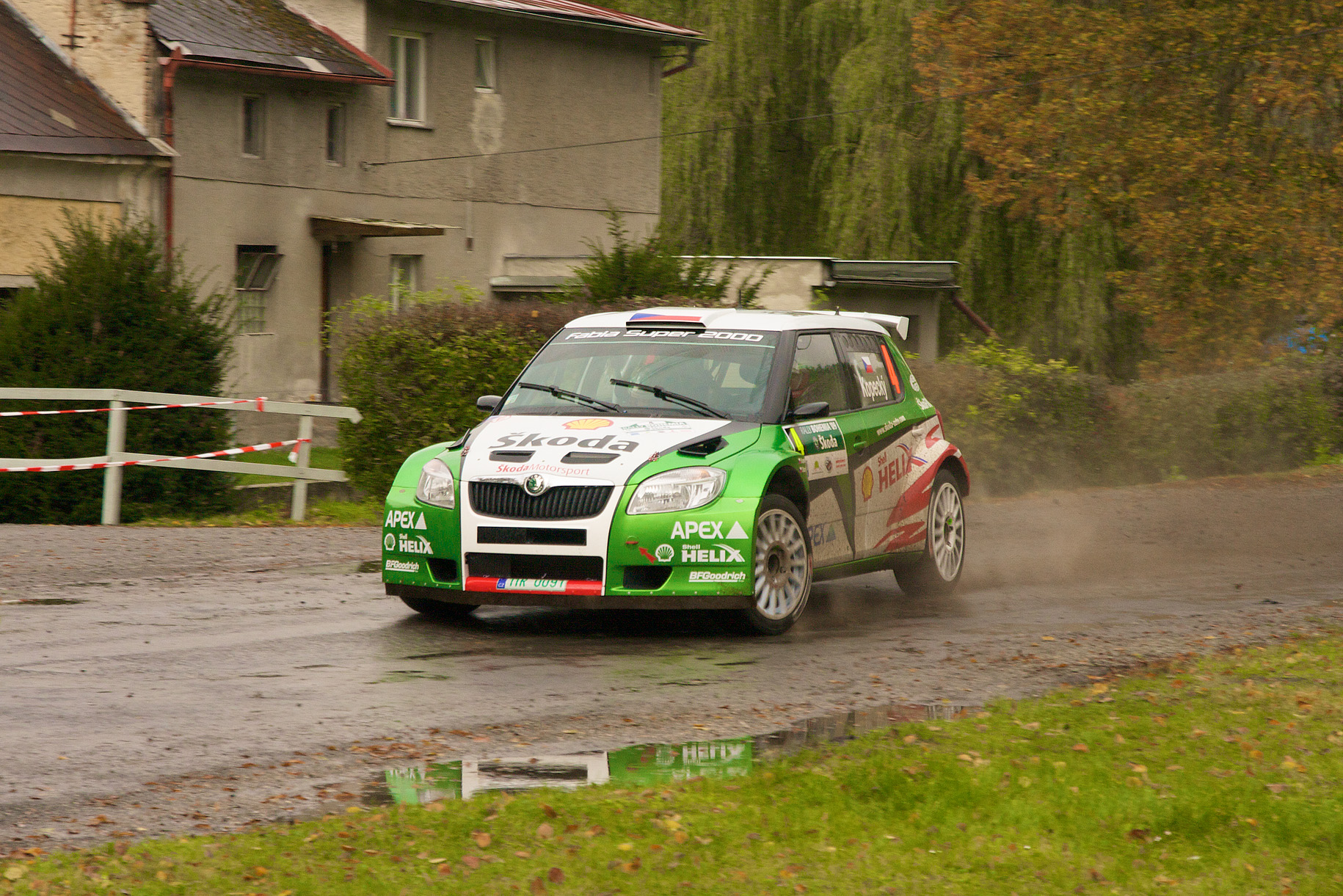
Rally Bohemia 2009

The year 1991 marks one of the greatest milestones in the history of Škoda Motorsport as it marked the beginning of a new partnership with Volkswagen. In 1994, Škoda Motorsport decided to enter its crews into the complete FIA World Cup series with the Škoda Favorit car, and they achieved the World Cup victory for the Škoda brand. The following year, the Škoda Favorit was replaced by the new model range, Škoda Felicia. From 1997 until 1999, the Octavia kit car was used which was seen as a step to enter the top class of the WRC.

On 1 January 1999 the Škoda Octavia WRC was homologated. The Octavia became a suitable platform for Škoda Motorsport to compete at the top level on the world's racing tracks. The most significant successes were achieved by the crews Thiry - Prévot, Schwarz - Heimer, and Gardemeister - Lukander.

After two years of development, the Škoda Fabia WRC was presented at the Geneva Motor Show in 2003, and it received homologation on 1 July that year.

=== From 2009 ===
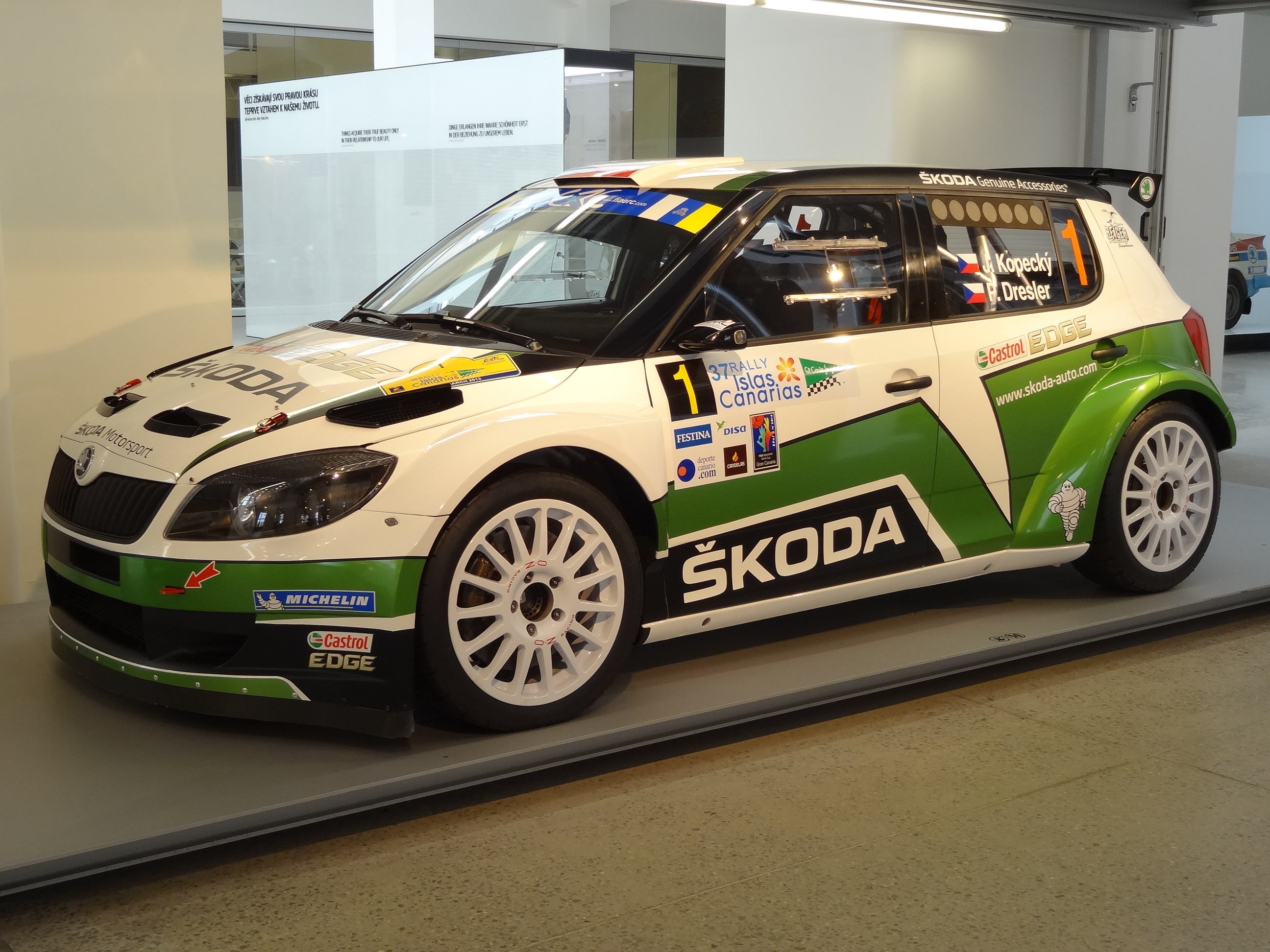
2012 Škoda Fabia Super 2000

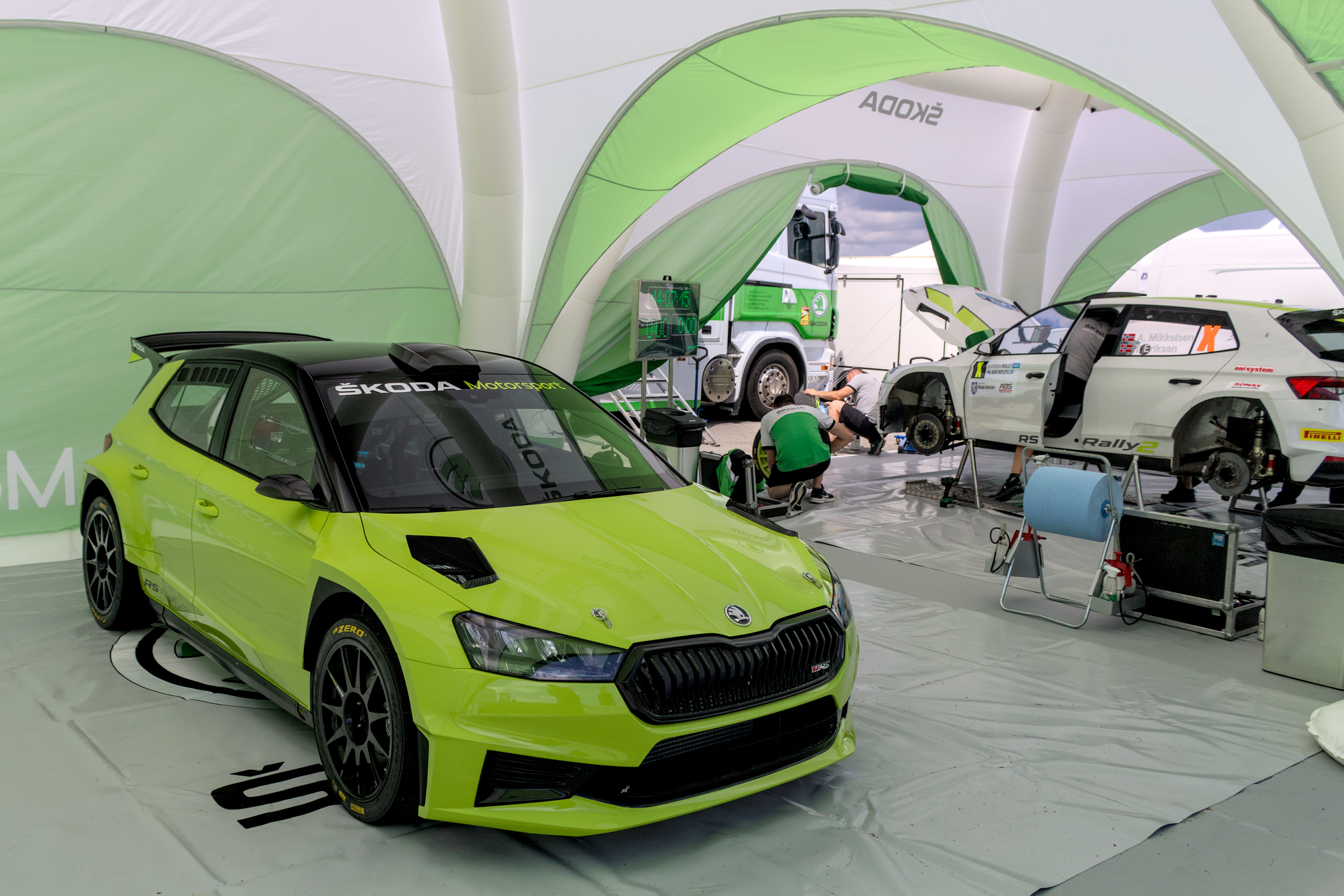
2022 Škoda Fabia RS Rally2

From 2009 onwards, the Škoda Fabia S2000 took over as the successor to the Škoda Fabia WRC, and it dominated the world of rallying in its category. No other car had been as successful in this category before. The Škoda Fabia S2000 achieved 50 national and international titles worldwide, marking the most successful chapter in the history of Škoda Motorsport until it was surpassed by its successor, the Škoda Fabia Rally2 based on the 3rd generation of the Fabia production model. The Škoda Fabia Rally2 proved to be a highly successful continuation of its predecessor, and its crews managed to secure several valuable titles, including the manufacturer title in 2015, the year when this model was homologated. However, the most successful year was 2016 when the Thiry - Prévot crew won the WRC 2 category in the FIA World Rally Championship, securing both the team and driver titles. In 2017, the Tidemand - Andersson crew continued the success by winning the WRC 2 category in the FIA World Rally Championship, and Škoda Motorsport earned another manufacturer title in the WRC 2 category.

The Škoda Fabia Rally2 achieved victories in numerous international and national championships. A notable success was the back-to-back victory in the Czech Republic by the crew Kopecký - Dresler, who won all events in the Czech Rally Championship (MČR) and became the Czech champions in 2017. In 2018, the Czech crew Kopecký - Dresler followed the success of their teammates from previous years and won the world champion title in the WRC 2 category, while Škoda Motorsport secured another manufacturer title in the WRC 2 category. Additionally, they were crowned champions in the Czech Republic in 2018.

In 2019, the Škoda Fabia Rally2 was replaced by a new version - the Škoda Fabia Rally2 evo. This model was homologated on 1 April 2019, and it debuted at one of the events in the Czech Rally Championship in Český Krumlov, where the crew Kopecký - Dresler secured the first place. The final round of the MČR was the Barum Czech Rally Zlín, where the same crew won, securing the title of Czech Rally Champions 2019. Škoda Motorsport also had exceptional success in the FIA World Rally Championship, where they won the team title in the WRC 2 Pro category, and the Finnish crew Rovanperä - Halttunen became the world champions in the WRC 2 Pro category for drivers and co-drivers. Kalle Rovanperä became the youngest world champion in history.

In 2020, the pandemic situation caused by COVID-19 significantly affected the motorsport industry, and Škoda Motorsport primarily focused on supporting its customers and developing customer sports services. Despite the challenges, Škoda Motorsport participated in the Czech Rally Championship, where the factory crew Jan Kopecký and Jan Hloušek finished in second place overall. Additionally, Škoda Motorsport began a unique collaboration with the young and talented driver Oliver Solberg, providing support for selected events in the FIA World Rally Championship. In 2021, Škoda Motorsport focused exclusively on supporting customer teams in competitions. The team partnered with the customer team Toksport WRT, which used Škoda Fabia Rally2 evo cars in the World Rally Championship and the European Championship. The collaboration resulted in several victories and titles, including the WRC 2 Pro team title and the WRC 2 Pro driver title for the Finnish crew Rovanperä - Halttunen, making Kalle Rovanperä the youngest world champion. The team also achieved over 20 titles in various international and national championships. In 2021, Škoda Motorsport celebrated its 120th anniversary of involvement in motorsport, with various events and activities held throughout the year. In 2022, Škoda Motorsport focused primarily on its customer program and provided engineering and technical support to the Toksport WRT team, which achieved success in the WRC2 category. Additionally, Škoda Motorsport worked on the development of a purely electric rally car, the ŠKODA RE-X1, in collaboration with Škoda Austria, Kreisel Electric, and the Baumschlager Rally & Racing team. The team also started testing the new Rally2 spec car based on the fourth generation of the Škoda Fabia production model.

== Customer support ==
Within the customer program, there is a sale of racing cars and the provision of customer services. The program was launched in 2009 with the Škoda Fabia S2000 project and continues with the Škoda Fabia Rally2 car. Since 2015, Škoda Motorsport has sold more than 470 Škoda Fabia Rally2 and Škoda Fabia Rally2 evo cars to customer teams worldwide. As of 2020, Škoda Motorsport no longer has its own factory team and primarily supports its numerous customer teams in international rallies. After purchasing a rally car, Škoda Motorsport can offer its customer teams a wide range of services, from supplying spare parts to technical support, upon request. At the forefront of the customer teams is the factory-supported German team, Toksport WRT.

=== Fabia S2000 ===
The Škoda Fabia S2000 is a racing car belonging to the Super 2000 class, which successfully underwent homologation at the beginning of 2009. Škoda Motorsport produced this car between 2009 and 2015. With this project, Škoda Motorsport entered the market, selling new and used cars to private teams. During the project's existence, 63 specials were sold, making this model one of the most successful in the S2000 class. Among the notable customer successes are the victory in Sweden in the World Championship for Super 2000 cars, achieved by Pre-Gunnar Andresson, and the achievements of Patrik Sandell, who won two asphalt rallies in the SWRC in Germany and France.

=== Fabia Rally2 ===
The successes of the Škoda Fabia S2000 project were followed by the homologation of the Škoda Fabia Rally2 in 2015, which garnered great interest among customers. This car belongs to the Rally2 category, formerly known as R5. Vehicles in this category are more accessible and overall cheaper to operate compared to the S2000 group. In April 2019, the Škoda Fabia Rally2 evo was homologated, and the first car was officially handed over to the 1st customer in July 2019. The first customer was Toni Gardemeister, a former factory driver for Škoda Motorsport. This initial customer car was already used in the Finnish rally at the beginning of August 2019. Many customers around the world appreciate the technical prowess and quality of the car, as they compete with the newly homologated vehicle. The most successful year for Škoda Motorsport and its customers was 2019 when 19 customers won national titles, and 4 customers claimed continental championship titles. Undoubtedly, the biggest customer success of 2019 was the victory of Perre-Louis Loubet in the World Championship, where he won the WRC2 category designated for private teams. In early 2020, the car was renamed from the original version Škoda Fabia R5 evo to Škoda Fabia Rally2 evo. The reason for this change was the rebranding of the R5 group to Rally2, introduced by the FIA at the beginning of 2020. In 2020, a unique collaboration was established with the young talented driver Oliver Solberg, who received support in selected events within the World Rally Championship. The year 2020 was heavily impacted by the COVID-19 pandemic, affecting various sports including rally. Many national championships were either canceled or significantly shortened. Despite these complications, customers still achieved a total of 14 regional and national titles. One of the most significant achievements was the victory of the Toksport WRT team in the World Championship in the WRC2 category in the team standings.

=== Fabia RS Rally2 ===
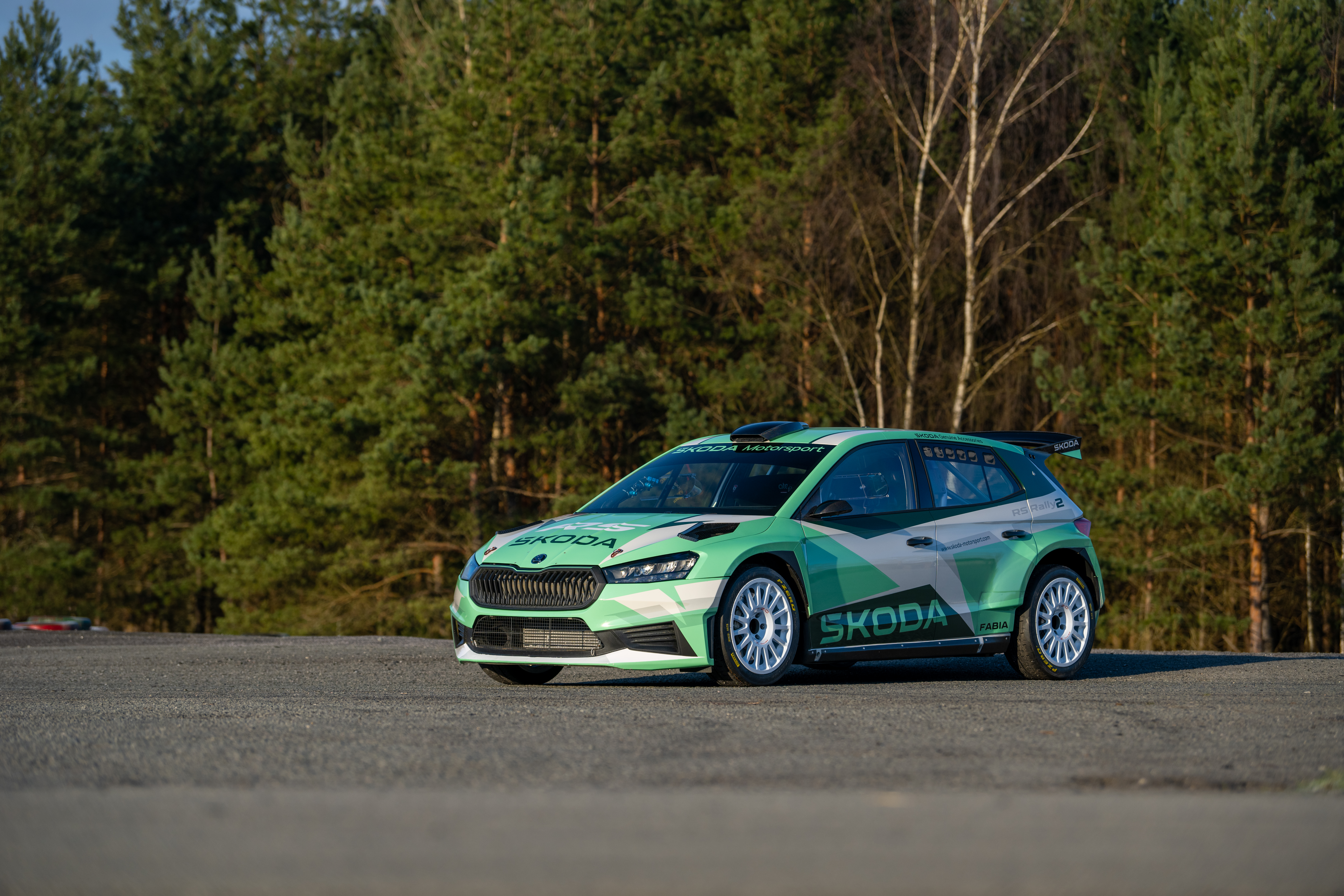
Škoda Fabia RS Rally2

The latest model from Škoda Motorsport is the Škoda Fabia RS Rally2, which was unveiled during its world premiere on 14 June 2022, in Mladá Boleslav at the Škoda Motorsport team's headquarters. The new Škoda Fabia RS Rally2 is a completely newly developed Rally2 category racing car, boasting the best aerodynamics in its class and a high body stiffness derived from the production model. In addition to improved powertrain, electronics, safety, and vehicle controls, the experts from Škoda Motorsport also developed a new 1.6-liter turbocharged engine based on the EA888 family of gasoline TSI engines seen in the RS models. The engine delivers approximately 214 kW of power, a maximum torque of 430 Nm, and transmits the power to all four wheels through a sequential five-speed gearbox and two mechanical differentials. The new car's livery, Mamba Green, also connects it to the RS models, following the tradition seen in the Octavia RS, Enyaq Coupé RS iV, and others. During the preparation of the new Škoda Fabia RS Rally2 for its first competitive drives, the Škoda Motorsport team completed an extensive testing program on asphalt, gravel, and snow, lasting almost a year and covering over 10,000 km of testing. From the summer of 2021, testing drives took place in the Czech Republic, France, Italy, Croatia, Germany, Belgium, Spain, and extreme winter conditions in northern Finland. The first competitive debut of the new generation rally car took place at the German Lausitz Rallye on 5 November 2022, with the customer team Toksport entering the car in the race, and Andreas Mikkelsen taking the wheel.

== Team principals ==
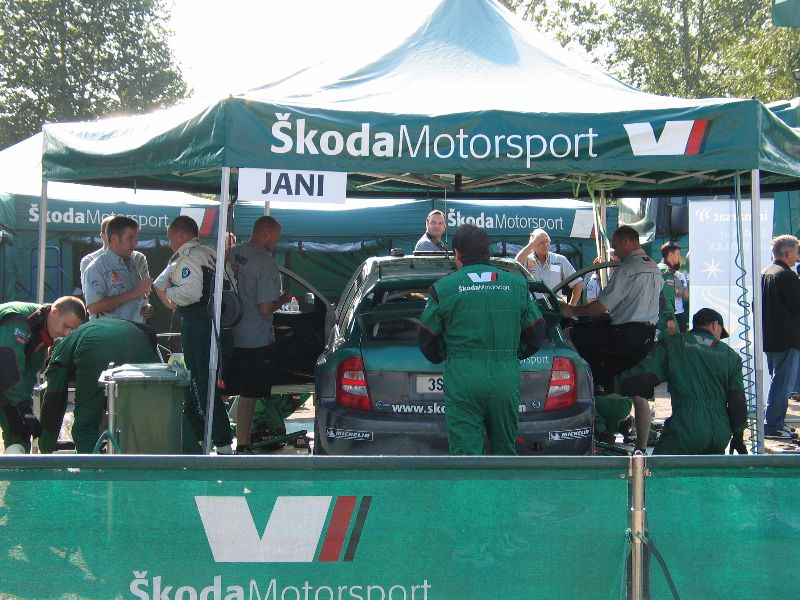
Garage Škoda Motorsport (2004)

- Jiří Kotek (1981–1989)
- Pavel Janeba (1990–2003)
- Martin Mühlmeier (2004–2007)
- Armin Schwarz/Raimund Baumschlager (2006 – Red Bull Škoda)
- Michal Hrabánek (2007–now)

== Major championship victories ==
Year	Championship	Driver(s)	Car
1994	FIA 2-Litre World Rally Cup	(Czech Republic) Emil Triner	Škoda Favorit 136L
1994	FIA 2-Litre World Rally Cup	(Czech Republic) Jindřich Štolfa	Škoda Favorit 136L
1994	FIA 2-Litre World Rally Cup	(Czech Republic) Pavel Sibera	Škoda Favorit 136L
2010	WRC Cup for Super 2000 Teams Championship	(Sweden) Patrik Sandell	Škoda Fabia S2000
2010	IRC Drivers Championship	(Finland) Juho Hänninen	Škoda Fabia S2000
2010	IRC Manufacturers Championship	(Finland) Juho Hänninen	Škoda Fabia S2000
2010	IRC Manufacturers Championship	(Czech Republic) Jan Kopecký	Škoda Fabia S2000
2010	IRC Manufacturers Championship	(France) Nicolas Vouilloz	Škoda Fabia S2000
2010	IRC Manufacturers Championship	(Belgium) Freddy Loix	Škoda Fabia S2000
2010	IRC Manufacturers Championship	(United Kingdom) Guy Wilks	Škoda Fabia S2000
2011	SWRC Drivers Championship	(Finland) Juho Hänninen	Škoda Fabia S2000
2011	IRC Drivers Championship	(Norway) Andreas Mikkelsen	Škoda Fabia S2000
2011	IRC Manufacturers Championship	(Finland) Juho Hänninen	Škoda Fabia S2000
2011	IRC Manufacturers Championship	(Czech Republic) Jan Kopecký	Škoda Fabia S2000
2011	IRC Manufacturers Championship	(France) Nicolas Vouilloz	Škoda Fabia S2000
2011	IRC Manufacturers Championship	(Belgium) Freddy Loix	Škoda Fabia S2000
2011	IRC Manufacturers Championship	(Norway) Andreas Mikkelsen	Škoda Fabia S2000
2012	IRC Drivers Championship	(Norway) Andreas Mikkelsen	Škoda Fabia S2000
2012	IRC Manufacturers Championship	(Finland) Juho Hänninen	Škoda Fabia S2000
2012	IRC Manufacturers Championship	(Czech Republic) Jan Kopecký	Škoda Fabia S2000
2012	IRC Manufacturers Championship	(Norway) Andreas Mikkelsen	Škoda Fabia S2000
2012	European Rally Championship	(Finland) Juho Hänninen	Škoda Fabia S2000
2013	European Rally Championship	(Czech Republic) Jan Kopecký	Škoda Fabia S2000
2014	European Rally Championship	(Finland) Esapekka Lappi	Škoda Fabia S2000
2015	FIA World Rally Championship-2 for Teams	(Finland) Esapekka Lappi	Škoda Fabia R5
2015	FIA World Rally Championship-2 for Teams	(Sweden) Pontus Tidemand	Škoda Fabia R5
2015	FIA World Rally Championship-2 for Teams	(Czech Republic) Jan Kopecký	Škoda Fabia R5
2016	FIA World Rally Championship-2 for Drivers	(Finland) Esapekka Lappi	Škoda Fabia R5
2016	FIA World Rally Championship-2 for Teams	(Finland) Esapekka Lappi	Škoda Fabia R5
2016	FIA World Rally Championship-2 for Teams	(Sweden) Pontus Tidemand	Škoda Fabia R5
2016	FIA World Rally Championship-2 for Teams	(Czech Republic) Jan Kopecký	Škoda Fabia R5

== Results ==
=== WRC results ===
From 1999 to 2005 the team competed in the highest category of the World Championship. From 2015 to 2019, and from 2021 to 2022, the team won the second highest category of the WRC-2 with the Škoda Fabia Rally2 and the Škoda Fabia Rally2 evo.

=== ERC results ===
Škoda Motorsport drivers won the 2012–2014 European Rally Championship with the Škoda Fabia S2000.

=== APRC results ===
Year	Team	Driver(s)	Car	1	2	3	4	5	6	APRC	Points	Place	Points
2012	MRF Tyres	Chris Atkinson	Škoda Fabia S2000	NZL; 1	NZL; 2	AUS; 1	MYS; 2	JPN	CHN; 2	1st	154	1st	179
2012	MRF Tyres	Gaurav Gill	Škoda Fabia S2000	NZL; 3	NCL; 1	AUS; Ret	MYS; Ret	JPN; Ret	CHN; Ret	4th	82	1st	179
2013	Team MRF	Gaurav Gill	Škoda Fabia S2000	NZL; 2	NCL; 1	AUS; Ret	MYS	JPN; 1	CHN; 2	1st	145.5	1st	197.5
2013	Team MRF	Esapekka Lappi	Škoda Fabia S2000	NZL; 1	NCL; Ret	AUS; 1	MYS; Ret	JPN; Ret	CHN; 1	2nd	117	1st	197.5
2014	Team MRF	Gaurav Gill	Škoda Fabia S2000	NZL; 1	NCL; 2	AUS; Ret	MYS; 1	JPN; Ret	CHN; Ret	3rd	104	1st	192
2014	Team MRF	Jan Kopecký	Škoda Fabia S2000	NZL; 2	NCL; 1	AUS; 1	MYS; Ret	JPN; 1	CHN; 1	1st	190	1st	192
2015	Team MRF	Gaurav Gill	Škoda Fabia S2000	NZL; 2	NCL; 1	AUS; Ret	MYS; 2	JPN; Ret	CHN; Ret	3rd	104	1st	389
2015	Team MRF	Pontus Tidemand	Škoda Fabia S2000	NZL; 1	NCL; 2	AUS; 1	MYS; 1	JPN; 1		1st	225	1st	389
2015	Team MRF	Pontus Tidemand	Škoda Fabia Rally2						CHN; 1	1st	225	1st	389
2016	Team MRF	Gaurav Gill	Škoda Fabia Rally2	NZL; 1	AUS; 1	CHN; 1	JPN; 1	MYS; 1	IND; 1	1st	192	1st	322
2016	Team MRF	Fabian Kreim	Škoda Fabia Rally2	NZL; 2	AUS; 2	CHN; 3	JPN; 2	MYS; 17	IND; 5	2nd	138	1st	322
2017	Team MRF	Gaurav Gill	Škoda Fabia Rally2	NZL; 1	AUS; 2	MYS; 2	JPN; 1	IND; 1		1st	174	1st	334
2017	Team MRF	Ole Christian Veiby	Škoda Fabia Rally2	NZL; 2	AUS; 1	MYS; 1	JPN; 3	IND; 2		2nd	160	1st	334
