= Plazy =

- Municipality
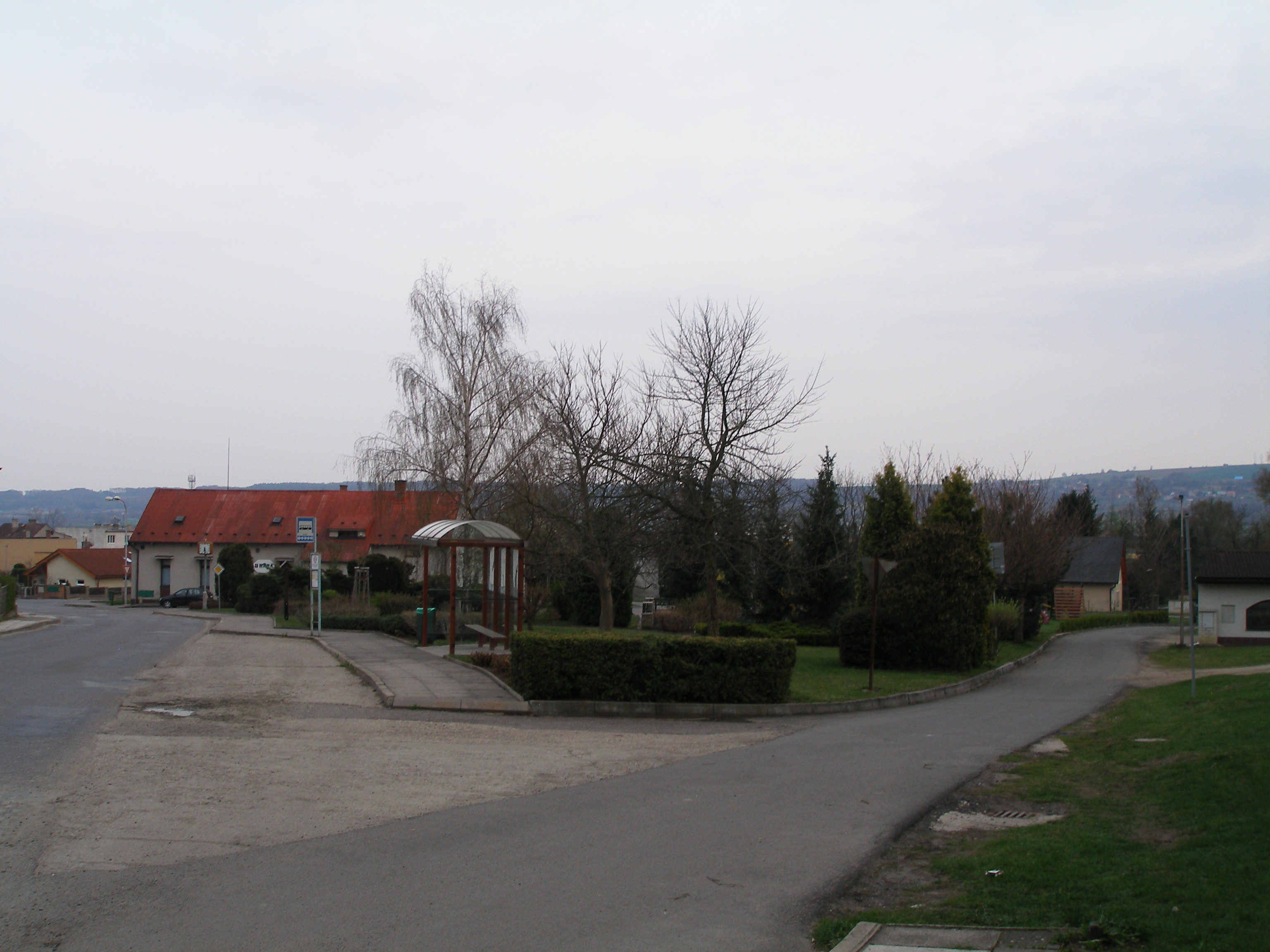
- Centre of Plazy

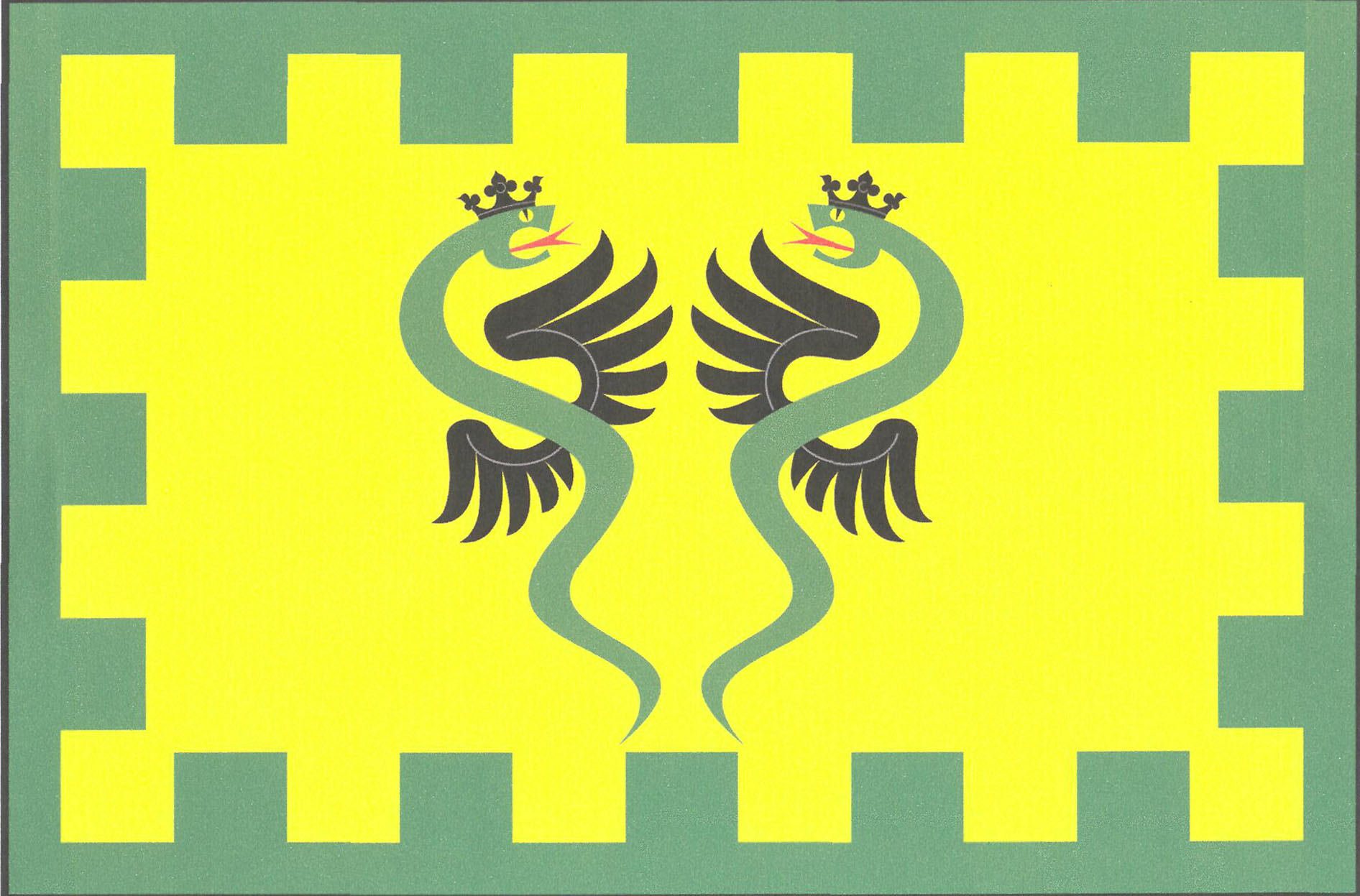
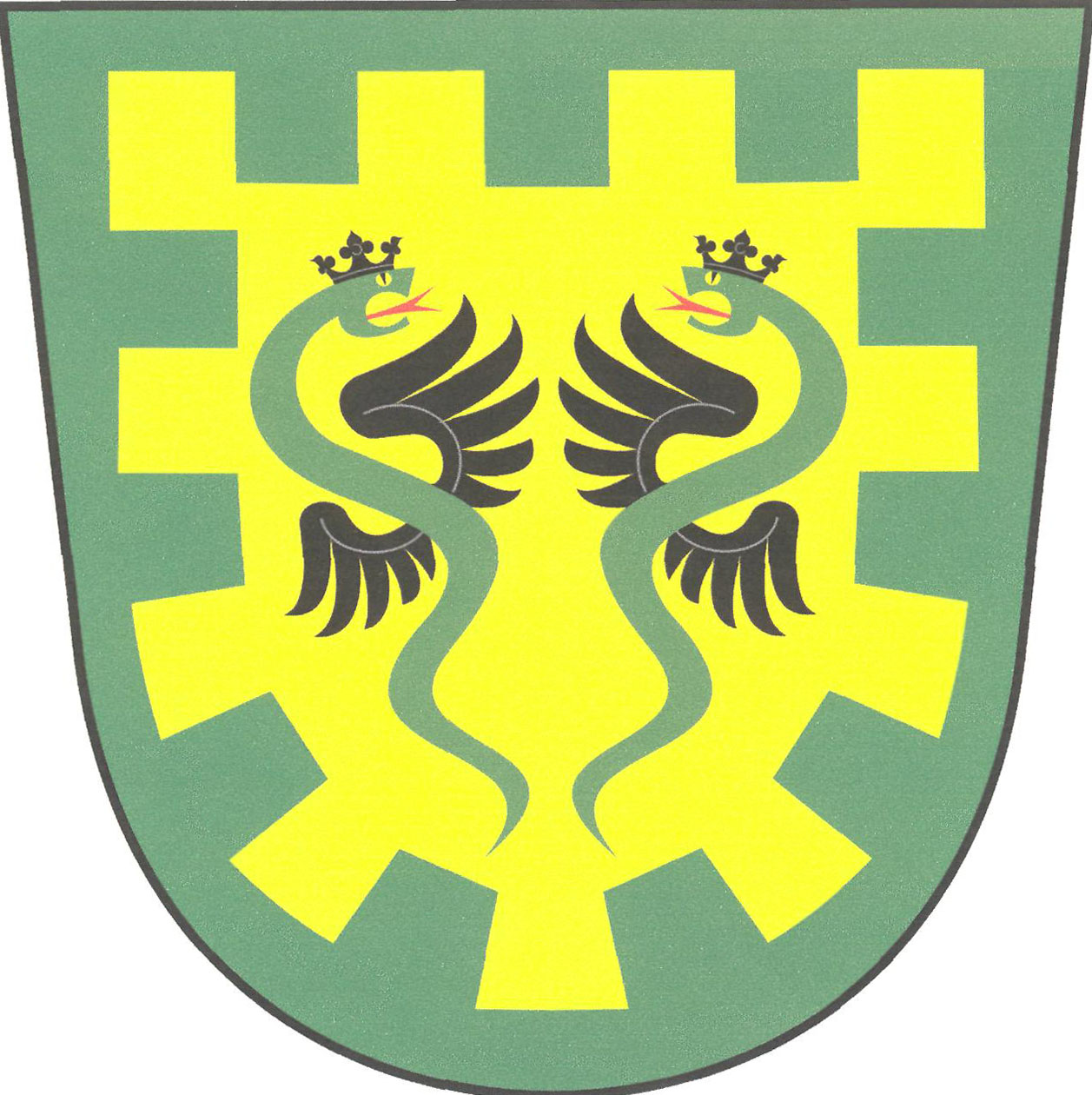
- Flag Coat of arms

- Location in the Czech Republic
- Coordinates: 50°24′51″N 14°58′30″E
- Country: Czech Republic
- Region: Central Bohemian
- District: Mladá Boleslav
- First mentioned: 1322

Area
  - Total: 3.34 km^{2} (1.29 sq mi)
- Elevation: 221 m (725 ft)

Population (2026-01-01)
  - Total: 507
  - Density: 152/km^{2} (393/sq mi)
- Time zone: UTC+1 (CET)
  - Summer (DST): UTC+2 (CEST)
- Postal code: 293 01
- Website: www.plazy.cz

Plazy is a municipality and village in Mladá Boleslav District in the Central Bohemian Region of the Czech Republic. It has about 500 inhabitants.

== Administrative division ==
Plazy consists of two municipal parts (in brackets population according to the 2021 census):

- Plazy (341)
- Valy (139)

== Etymology ==
The name is derived from the word plaz. In old Czech it was an expression for a slippery path.

== Geography ==
Plazy is located about 4 kilometres (2 mi) east of Mladá Boleslav and 47 km (29 mi) northeast of Prague. It lies in a flat agricultural landscape in the Jičín Uplands.

== History ==
The first written mention of Plazy is from 1322.

== Demographics ==
Historical population

Year	Pop.	±%
1869	268	—
1880	280	+4.5%
1890	286	+2.1%
1900	294	+2.8%
1910	313	+6.5%

Year	Pop.	±%
1921	396	+26.5%
1930	407	+2.8%
1950	304	−25.3%
1961	319	+4.9%
1970	300	−6.0%

Year	Pop.	±%
1980	287	−4.3%
1991	335	+16.7%
2001	358	+6.9%
2011	503	+40.5%
2021	480	−4.6%

Source: Censuses

== Economy ==
In the eastern part of the municipal territory is an extensive industrial zone, which partially extends into the territory of neighbouring Mladá Boleslav. The largest company based here is the automotive parts manufacturer Faurecia Interior Systems Bohemia.

== Transport ==
The I/16 road (the section from Mladá Boleslav to Jičín) runs along the southern municipal border.

== Sights ==
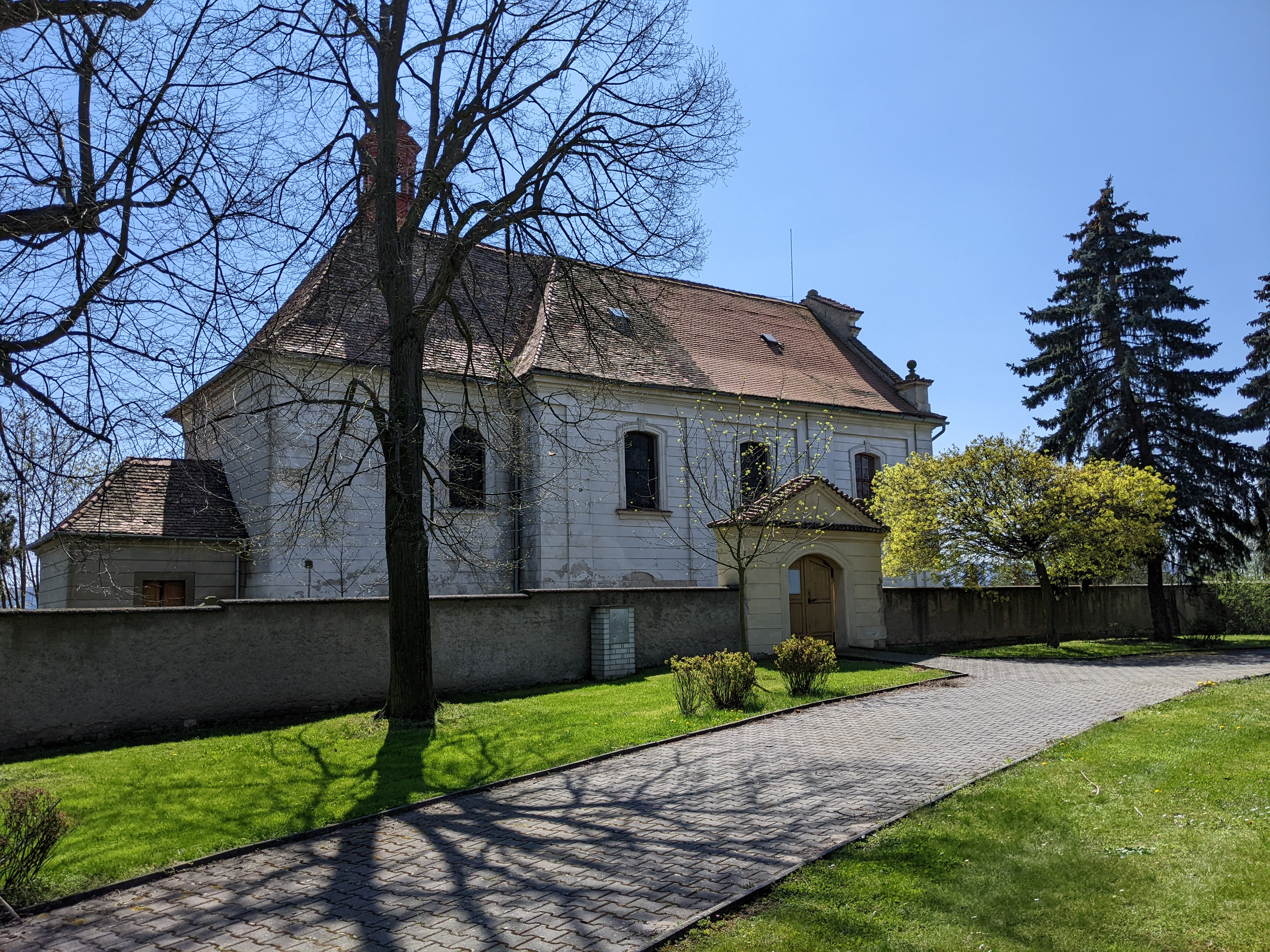
Church of Saints Simon and Jude

The main landmark of Plazy is the Church of Saints Simon and Jude. It is a Baroque church built in 1739. It replaced an old church, first mentioned in 1394, which was destroyed by the fall of the newly added tower in 1731.
