= Jan Kopecký =

Czech rally driver (born 1982)

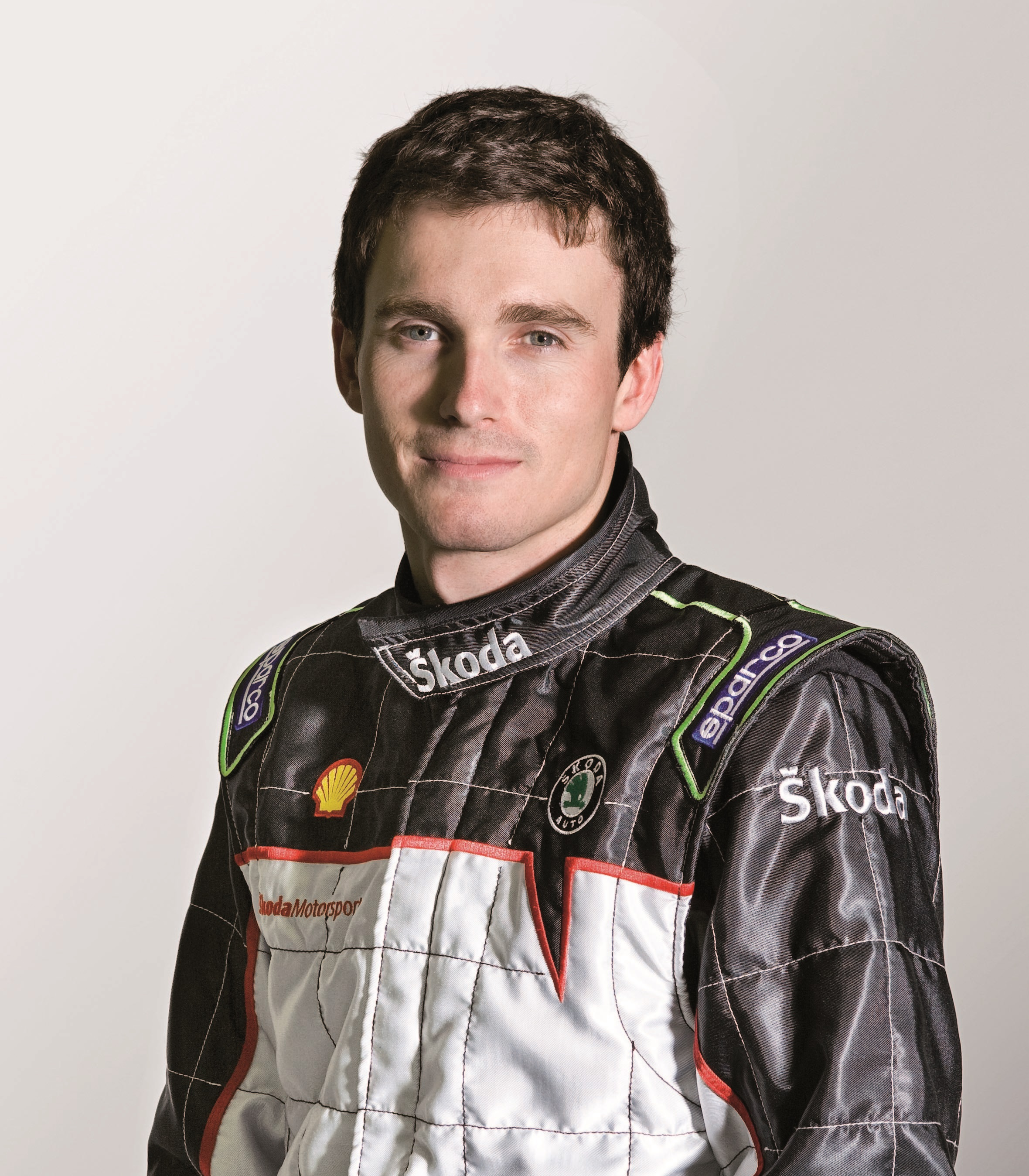
- Kopecký in 2008

Personal information
- Nationality: (Czech Republic) Czech
- Born: 28 January 1982 (age 44); Opočno, Czechoslovakia

World Rally Championship record
- Years active: 2002–2008, 2015–2020
- Co-driver: (Czech Republic) Filip Schovánek (Czech Republic) Petr Starý (Czech Republic) Pavel Dresler (Czech Republic) Jan Hloušek
- Teams: Škoda
- Rallies: 58
- Championships: 0
- Rally wins: 0
- Podiums: 0
- Stage wins: 4
- Total points: 57
- First rally: 2002 Rallye Deutschland
- Last rally: 2020 Rally Monza

Jan Kopecký (born 28 January 1982) is a professional rally driver from Czech Republic who drives for Škoda Motorsport. He is the 2013 ERC champion, 2018 WRC-2 champion as well as a multiple champion of the Czech Rally Championship. He is also a four-time runner-up in the now-defunct IRC championship and a champion of the Asia-Pacific Rally Championship. In terms of total professional achievements, he is among the most successful drivers in rally history.

== Career ==
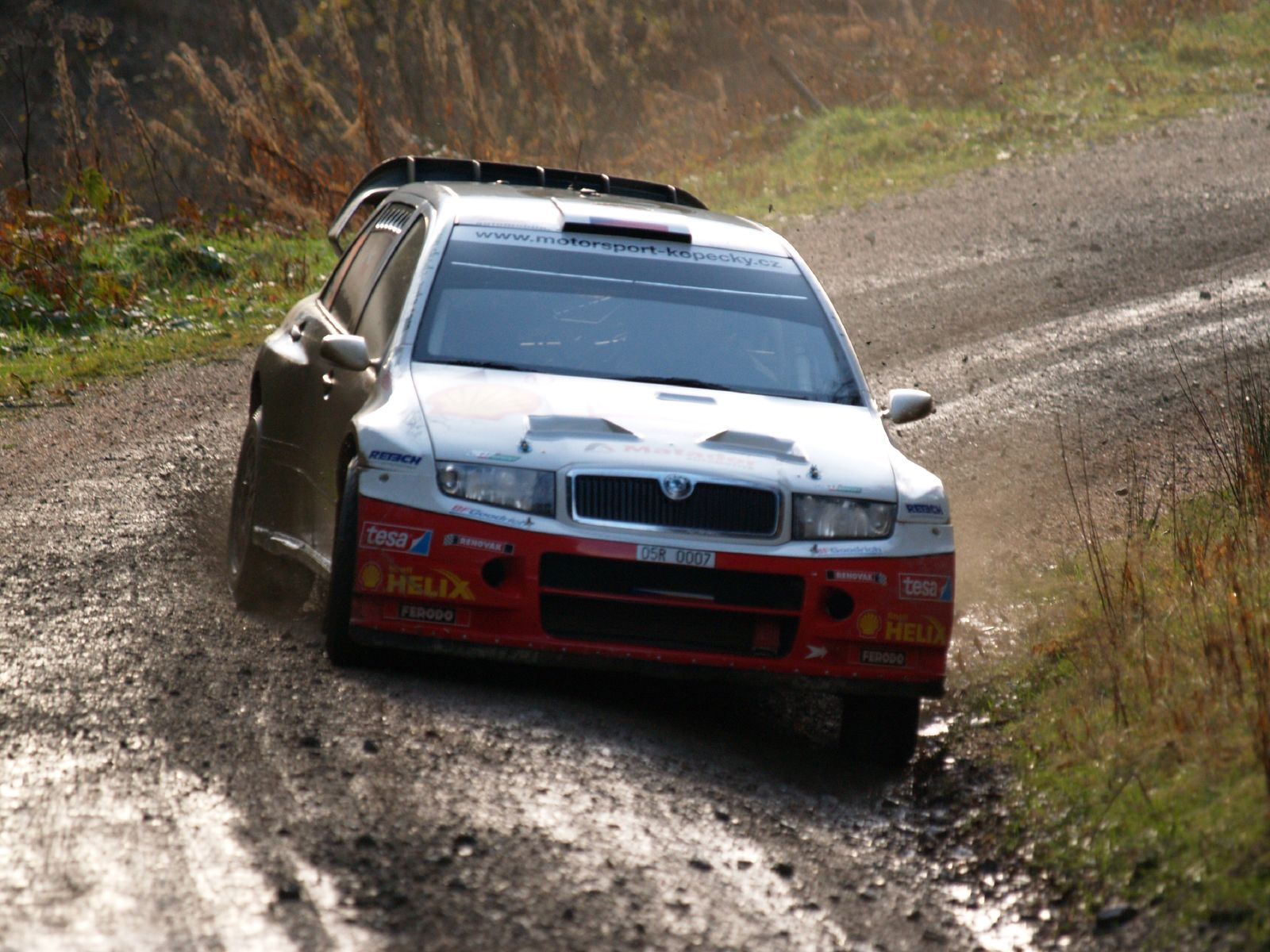
Kopecký at the 2007 Wales Rally GB.

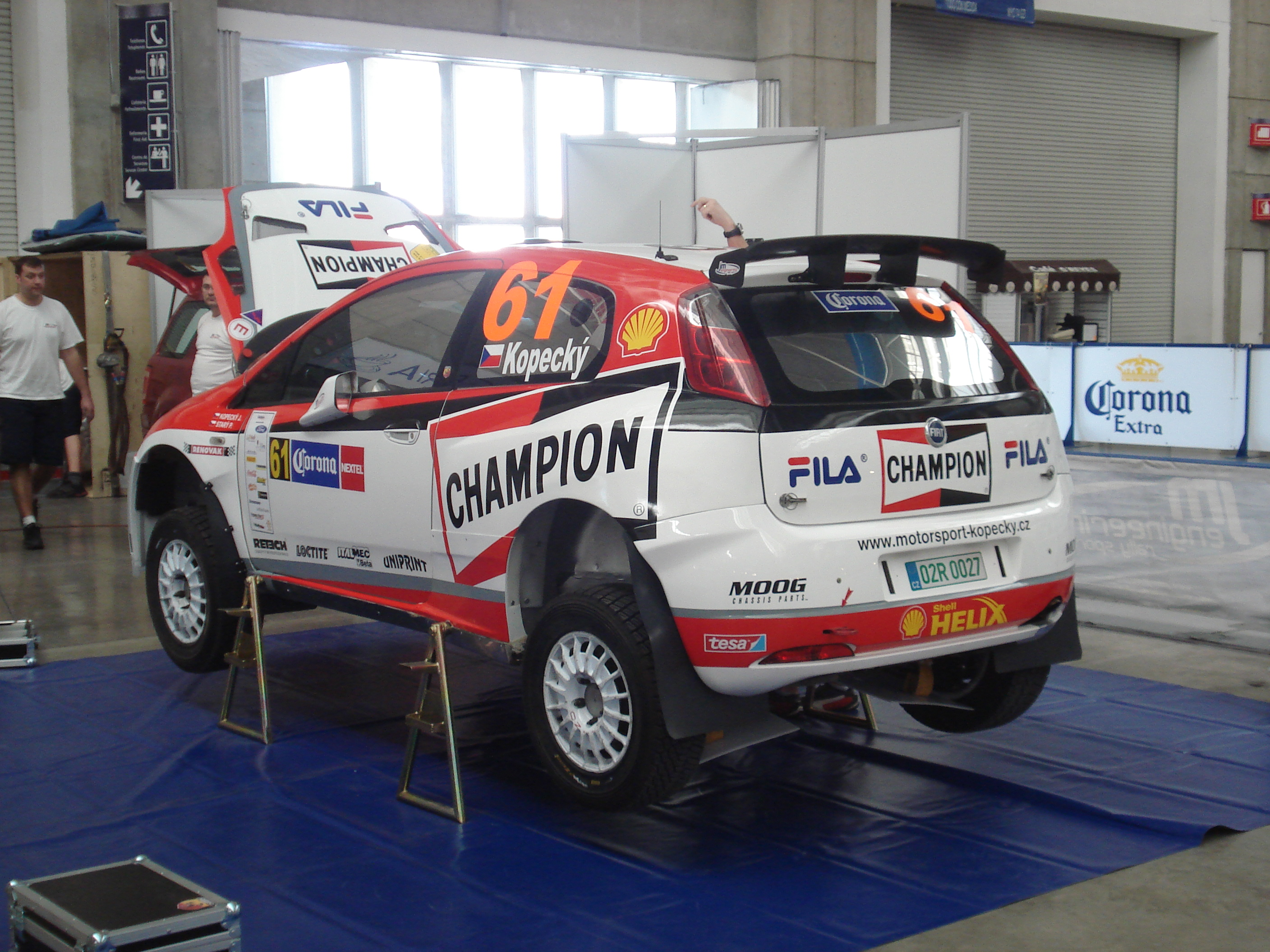
Kopecký at the 2008 Rally México.

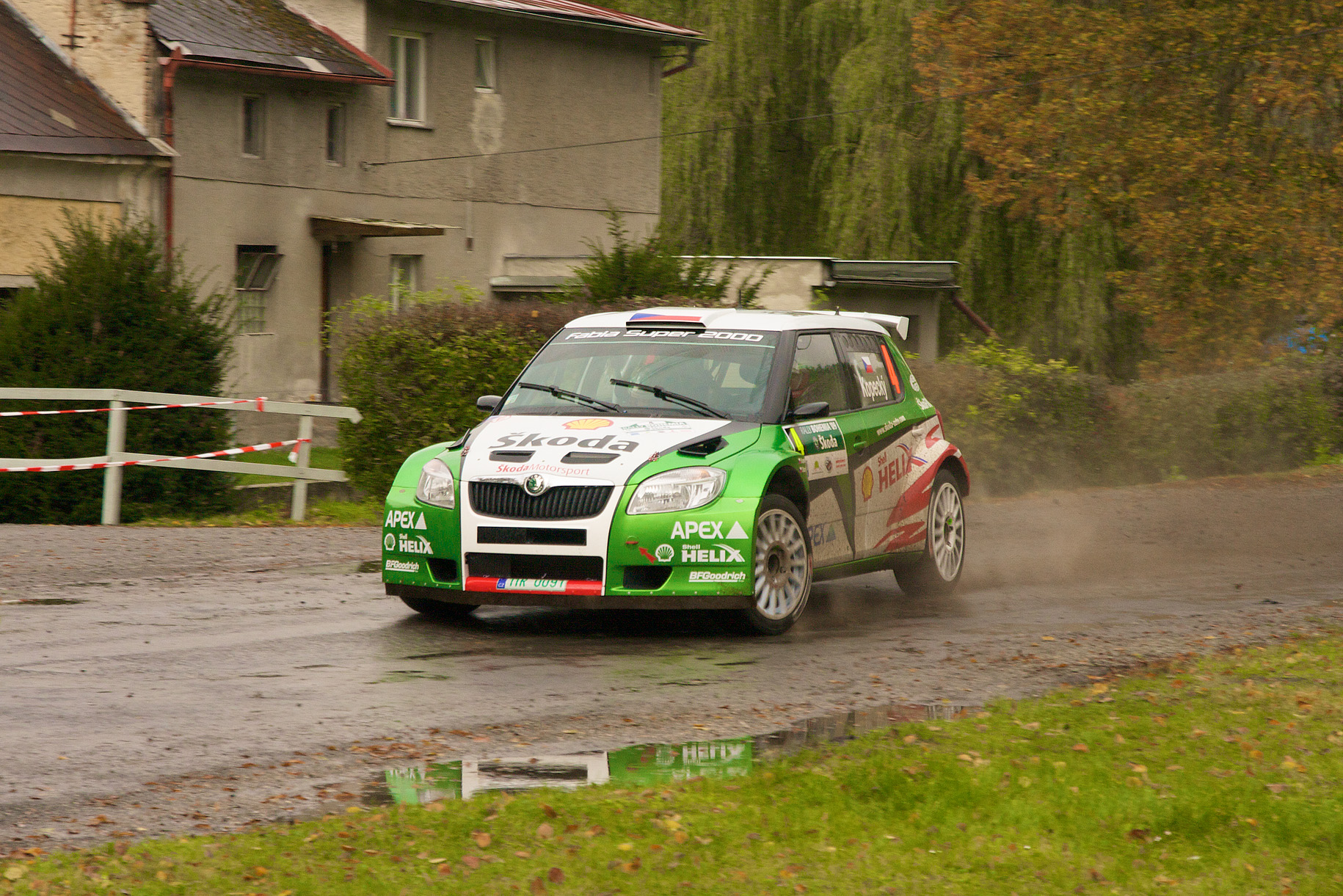
Kopecký at the 2009 Rally Bohemia.

After beginning his career as a circuit touring cars driver, Kopecký changed to rallysport in 2001, winning the national sprintrally championships at first. In 2004, he won the national classical rally championships and entered the world championships next year.

In the 2006 World Rally Championship season, Kopecký competed with co-driver Filip Schovánek driving a Škoda Fabia WRC. Kopecký won three Special Stages, SS18 at the 2006 Rally d'Italia Sardegna and SS9 and SS14 at the 2006 Rallye Deutschland. His best finish was fifth place at the 2006 Rally Catalunya, he scored seven points and 15th position.

In 2007, Kopecký continued competing with the Fabia and placed 12th in the drivers' world championship. His best finish was fifth place at the 2007 Rallye Deutschland, he scored more points than in 2006, ten points and 12th position.

In 2008, Kopecký entered Rally México with Fiat Grande Punto Abarth S2000 but retired at the second special stage. After that, he switched to Peugeot 207 S2000 and Intercontinental Rally Challenge. His best result was second place at the Rally Portugal and after Rally Russia he was hired by Škoda Motorsport and started testing Škoda Fabia S2000.

Kopecký competed in the Intercontinental Rally Challenge with a works Škoda Fabia Super 2000 finishing second in the championship and winning two events, the Rally Principe de Asturias and Barum Czech Rally Zlín, making him the first Czech driver to win the rally in a Czech car. Kris Meeke became champion with Peugeot 207 S2000 in 2009.

In 2010, Kopecký continued his relationship with Škoda and also with his good performance in IRC. He won Rally Islas Canarias and finished 2nd at Ypres Rally and at Rali Vinho da Madeira but he also twice retired from first position almost at the end of rally. It was at Rally Azores and at Barum Rally Zlín. Kopecký was again 2nd in drivers standings, this time Juho Hänninen, 2nd factory driver of Škoda Motorsport was champion.

In 2011, Kopecký was entered by Škoda Motorsport at the 2011 Monte Carlo Rally alongside of Freddy Loix, Juho Hänninen and Nicolas Vouilloz. In 2021, he entered to the Hungarian Rally Championship with a Skoda Fabia Rally2 Evo under the Topp Cars Rally Team alongside the Czech Championship .

== Results ==
=== WRC results ===
Year	Entrant	Car	1	2	3	4	5	6	7	8	9	10	11	12	13	14	15	16	Pos	Points
2002	Matador Czech Nation Team	Toyota Corolla WRC	MON	SWE	FRA	ESP	CYP	ARG	GRE	KEN	FIN	GER; Ret	ITA	NZL	AUS	GBR			-	0
2003	Škoda Matador Czech National Team	Škoda Octavia WRC	MON	SWE	TUR	NZL	ARG	GRE	CYP	GER; 20		AUS	ITA	FRA	ESP	GBR; Ret			-	0
2003	Jan Kopecký	Mitsubishi Lancer Evo 7									FIN; 32								-	0
2004	Škoda Motorsport	Škoda Fabia WRC	MON	SWE	MEX	NZL	CYP	GRE	TUR	ARG	FIN	GER	JPN	GBR	ITA	FRA	ESP; Ret	AUS	-	0
2005	Jan Kopecký	Mitsubishi Lancer Evo 7	MON	SWE; 37															26th	1
2005	Škoda Motorsport	Škoda Fabia WRC			MEX	NZL	ITA	CYP	TUR	GRE	ARG	FIN	GER; Ret	GBR	JPN	FRA; 12	ESP; 8	AUS	26th	1
2006	Czech Rally Team Škoda	Škoda Fabia WRC	MON; 11	SWE; 13	MEX	ESP; 5	FRA; 10	ARG	ITA; 17	GRE; 16	GER; 7	FIN; 8	JPN	CYP	TUR; Ret	AUS	NZL	GBR; 10	15th	7
2007	Czech Rally Team Kopecký	Škoda Fabia WRC	MON; 8	SWE; 10	NOR; 8	MEX	POR; 20	ARG	ITA; Ret	GRE; 7	FIN; Ret	GER; 5	NZL	ESP; Ret	FRA; 7	JPN	IRE	GBR; 12	12th	10
2008	Jan Kopecký	Fiat Grande Punto Abarth S2000	MON	SWE	MEX; Ret	ARG	JOR	ITA	GRE	TUR	FIN	GER	NZL	ESP	FRA	JPN	GBR		-	0
2015	Škoda Motorsport	Škoda Fabia R5	MON	SWE	MEX	ARG	POR	ITA; 9	POL	FIN	GER; 13	AUS	FRA		GBR; WD				25th	3
2015	Škoda Motorsport II	Škoda Fabia R5												ESP; 10					25th	3
2016	Škoda Motorsport	Škoda Fabia R5	MON	SWE	MEX	ARG	POR; 19	ITA; 10	POL	FIN	GER; 9	CHN; C	FRA; 12	ESP; 8	GBR; 16	AUS; WD			19th	7
2017	Škoda Motorsport	Škoda Fabia R5	MON; 8	SWE	MEX	FRA; 16	ARG	POR		POL	FIN	GER; 11		GBR	AUS				16th	7
2017	Škoda Motorsport II	Škoda Fabia R5							ITA; 10				ESP; 9						16th	7
2018	Škoda Motorsport II	Škoda Fabia R5	MON; 10	SWE	MEX	FRA; 8	ARG	POR	ITA; 8	FIN	GER; 9	TUR; 7	GBR						15th	17
2018	Škoda Motorsport	Škoda Fabia R5												ESP; 13	AUS				15th	17
2019	Škoda Motorsport	Škoda Fabia R5 Evo	MON	SWE	MEX	FRA	ARG	CHL	POR; 8	ITA; 10	FIN	GER; 11	TUR; 11	GBR; 18	ESP; 11	AUS; C			19th	5
2020	Toksport WRT	Škoda Fabia R5 Evo	MON	SWE	MEX	EST	TUR	ITA	MNZ; 13										NC	0

=== WRC-2 results ===
Year	Entrant	Car	1	2	3	4	5	6	7	8	9	10	11	12	13	14	Pos	Points
2015	Škoda Motorsport	Škoda Fabia R5	MON	SWE	MEX	ARG	POR	ITA; 3	POL	FIN	GER; 1	AUS	FRA		GBR; WD		8th	58
2015	Škoda Motorsport II	Škoda Fabia R5												ESP; 2			8th	58
2016	Škoda Motorsport	Škoda Fabia R5	MON	SWE	MEX	ARG	POR; 10	ITA; 2	POL	FIN	GER; 2	CHN; C	FRA; 2	ESP; 1	GBR; 4	AUS; WD	4th	92
2017	Škoda Motorsport	Škoda Fabia R5	MON; 2	SWE	MEX	FRA; 7	ARG	POR		POL	FIN	GER; 2		GBR	AUS		4th	85
2017	Škoda Motorsport II	Škoda Fabia R5							ITA; 1				ESP; 2				4th	85
2018	Škoda Motorsport II	Škoda Fabia R5	MON; 1	SWE	MEX	FRA; 1	ARG	POR	ITA; 1	FIN	GER; 1	TUR; 1	GBR				1st	143
2018	Škoda Motorsport	Škoda Fabia R5												ESP; 2	AUS		1st	143
2020	Toksport WRT	Škoda Fabia R5 Evo	MON	SWE	MEX	EST	TUR	ITA	MNZ; 3								8th	15

=== WRC-2 Pro results ===
Year	Entrant	Car	1	2	3	4	5	6	7	8	9	10	11	12	13	14	Pos	Points
2019	Škoda Motorsport	Škoda Fabia R5 Evo	MON	SWE	MEX	FRA	ARG	CHL	POR; 2	ITA; 2	FIN	GER; 1	TUR; 2	GBR; 2	ESP; 2	AUS; C	4th	115

=== IRC results ===
Year	Entrant	Car	1	2	3	4	5	6	7	8	9	10	11	12	13	Pos	Points
2008	Champion Racing	Peugeot 207 S2000	TUR; 5	POR; 2	BEL; Ret	RUS; 6	POR	CZE	ESP	ITA	SWI	CHI				7th	15
2009	Škoda Motorsport	Škoda Fabia S2000	MON; 4	BRA	KEN	POR; 2	BEL; 2	RUS; 2	POR	CZE; 1	ESP; 1	ITA; Ret	SCO			2nd	49
2010	Škoda Motorsport	Škoda Fabia S2000	MON; 5	CUR; 4	ARG; 3	CAN; 1	SAR; 3	YPR; 2	AZO; Ret	MAD; 2	ZLI; Ret	SAN; 6	SCO	CYP		2nd	47
2011	Škoda Motorsport	Škoda Fabia S2000	MON; 8	CAN; 2	COR; 2	YAL; 3	YPR; DNS	AZO; 3	ZLI; 1	MEC; 1	SAN; 4	SCO; 5	CYP; 2			2nd	183
2012	Škoda Motorsport	Škoda Fabia S2000	AZO	CAN; 1	IRL; 3	COR; 2	ITA; 1	YPR	SMR	ROM	ZLI; Ret	YAL	SLI	SAN; 2	CYP	2nd	101

=== ERC results ===
Year	Entrant	Car	1	2	3	4	5	6	7	8	9	10	11	12	Pos	Points
2013	Škoda Motorsport	Škoda Fabia S2000	JÄN; 1	LIE	CAN; 1	AZO; 1	COR; 2	YPR	ROM; 1	CZE; 1	POL; 3	CRO; 1	SAN	VAL	1st	287
2015	Škoda Motorsport	Škoda Fabia R5	JÄN	LIE	IRE	AZO	YPR	EST	CZE; 1	CYP	GRE	VAL			9th	36
2016	Škoda Motorsport	Škoda Fabia R5	CAN	IRE	GRE	AZO	YPR	EST	POL	CZE; 1	LIE	CYP			6th	39
2017	Škoda Motorsport	Škoda Fabia R5	AZO	CAN	ACR	CYP	POL	CZE; 1	RMC	LIE					9th	39
2018	Škoda Motorsport	Škoda Fabia R5	AZO	CAN	ACR	CYP	RMC	CZE; 1	POL	LIE					10th	38
2019	Škoda Motorsport	Škoda Fabia R5 Evo	AZO	CAN	LIE	POL	RMC	CZE; 1	CYP	HUN					7th	39
2021	Agrotec Škoda Rally Team	Škoda Fabia R5 Evo	POL	LAT	ITA	CZE; 1	PRT1	PRT2	HUN	ESP					14th	39
2022	Agrotec Skoda Rally Team	Škoda Fabia Rally2 evo	PRT1	PRT2	ESP1	POL	LAT	ITA	CZE; 1	ESP2					15th	32
2023	Agrotec Škoda Rally Team	Škoda Fabia RS Rally2	PRT	CAN	POL	LAT	SWE	ITA	CZE; 1	HUN					16th	32
2024	Agrotec Škoda Rally Team	Škoda Fabia RS Rally2	HUN	CAN	SWE	EST	ITA	CZE; 9	GBR	POL					39th	9
2025	Agrotec Škoda Rally Team	Škoda Fabia RS Rally2	ESP	HUN	SWE	POL	ITA	CZE; 1	GBR	CRO					12th	31

=== Czech Rally Championship results ===
Year	Entrant	Car	1	2	3	4	5	6	7	8	9	MMČR	Points
2001	Pennzoil Racing	Škoda Octavia	ŠUM; 21	VAL; 19	KRU	BOH	BAR; Ret	PŘÍ; Ret	TŘE; 11			-	0
2002	Matador Pneusport	Toyota Corolla WRC	ŠUM; Ret	VAL; 4	KRU; 3	BOH	BAR; Ret	PŘÍ; 3	TŘE; 1			4th	249
2003	Škoda Matador Team	Škoda Octavia WRC	ŠUM; Ret	VAL; Ret	KRU	BOH; 25	BAR; 3	PŘÍ; 1	TŘE; 1			3rd	79
2004	Škoda Matador Team	Škoda Fabia WRC	JÄN; 2	ŠUM; 18	TAT; 3	KRU; 3		BAR; 1	PŘÍ; 1	TŘE; 1		1st	182
2004	Škoda Motorsport	Škoda Fabia WRC					BOH; 1					1st	182
2005	Matador Pneusport	Mitsubishi Lancer Evo VII	JÄN; 7	ŠUM; 3	VAL		KRU; Ret		BAR; 3	PŘÍ; 9	TŘE	3rd	108
2005	Matador Pneusport	Škoda Fabia WRC				TAT; 2						3rd	108
2005	Škoda Motorsport	Škoda Fabia WRC						BOH; 1				3rd	108
2006	Matador Motorsport	Citroën C2 S1600	JÄN	ŠUM	TAT; Ret	KRU	BOH	BAR	TŘE	PŘÍ		-	0
2008	Champion Racing	Peugeot 207 S2000	JÄN	VAL	ŠUM	KRU	HUS; Ret	TŘE	BOH	BAR	PŘÍ	-	0
2009	Škoda Motorsport	Škoda Fabia S2000	VAL; 2	ŠUM	KRU	HUS	BAR; 1	PŘÍ	BOH; 2			3rd	117
2010	Škoda Motorsport	Škoda Fabia S2000	VAL	ŠUM	KRU	HUS	BOH	BAR; Ret	PŘÍ			-	0
2011	Škoda Motorsport	Škoda Fabia S2000	VAL; 1	ŠUM	KRU	HUS; 1	BOH	BAR; 1	PŘÍ			2nd	150
2012	Škoda Motorsport	Škoda Fabia S2000	JÄN; 1	VAL; 1	ŠUM; 1	KRU; 1	HUS; 1	BOH -	BAR; Ret	PŘÍ		1st	260
2013	Škoda Motorsport	Škoda Fabia S2000	JÄN; 1	ŠUM	KRU	HUS; 1	BOH; 1	BAR; 1	PŘÍ -			2nd	306
2014	Škoda Motorsport	Škoda Fabia S2000	JÄN	KRU; Ret	ŠUM	HUS	BOH; 1	BAR	PŘÍ			7th	98
2015	Škoda Motorsport	Škoda Fabia R5	ŠUM; 1	KRU; 1	HUS; 1	BOH; 1	BAR; 1	KLA				1st	412,5
2016	Škoda Motorsport	Škoda Fabia R5	ŠUM; 1	KRU; 1	HUS; 1	BOH; 1	BAR; 1	PŘÍ				1st	324
2017	Škoda Motorsport	Škoda Fabia R5	VAL; 1	ŠUM; 1	KRU; 1	HUS; 1	BOH; 1	BAR; 1	PŘÍ			1st	297
2018	Škoda Motorsport	Škoda Fabia R5	VAL; 1	ŠUM; 1	KRU; 1	HUS; 1	BOH; 1	BAR; 1	PŘÍ			1st	326
2019	Škoda Motorsport	Škoda Fabia R5	VAL; 1	ŠUM; 2								1st	311
2019	Škoda Motorsport	Škoda Fabia R5 Evo			KRU; 1	HUS	BOH; 1	BAR; 1	PŘÍ; C			1st	311
2020	Škoda Motorsport	Škoda Fabia R5 Evo	BOH; 2	VAL; 2	PAČ; 1							2nd	156
2021	Agrotec Škoda Rally Team	Škoda Fabia R5 Evo	VAL; 1	ŠUM; 1	HUS; 2		BAR; 1	PAČ; 1	KRU; 2			1st	316
2021	Škoda Motorsport	Škoda Fabia R5 Evo				BOH; 1						1st	316
2022	Agrotec Škoda Rally Team	Škoda Fabia Rally2 evo	VAL; 3	ŠUM; 1	KRU; 1	HUS; 1	BOH; 1	BAR; 1	PAČ; 1	3ST		1st	322.5
2023	Agrotec Škoda Rally Team	Škoda Fabia Rally2 evo	VAL; 3	ŠUM; 2	KRU; 1	HUS; 2	BOH; 2	BAR; 2	PAČ; 2			1st	325.5
2024*	Agrotec Škoda Rally Team	Škoda Fabia Rally2 evo	ŠUM; C	KRU; 2	HUS; 2	BOH; 3	BAR; 5	PAČ				2nd*	138*

* Season still in progress.

Sporting positions
Preceded by Juho Hänninen	European Rally Champion; 2013	Succeeded by Esapekka Lappi
Preceded by Gaurav Gill	Asia-Pacific Rally Champion; 2014	Succeeded by incumbent
