= Miroslav Jakeš =

Czech polar explorer and mountaineer (1951–2026)

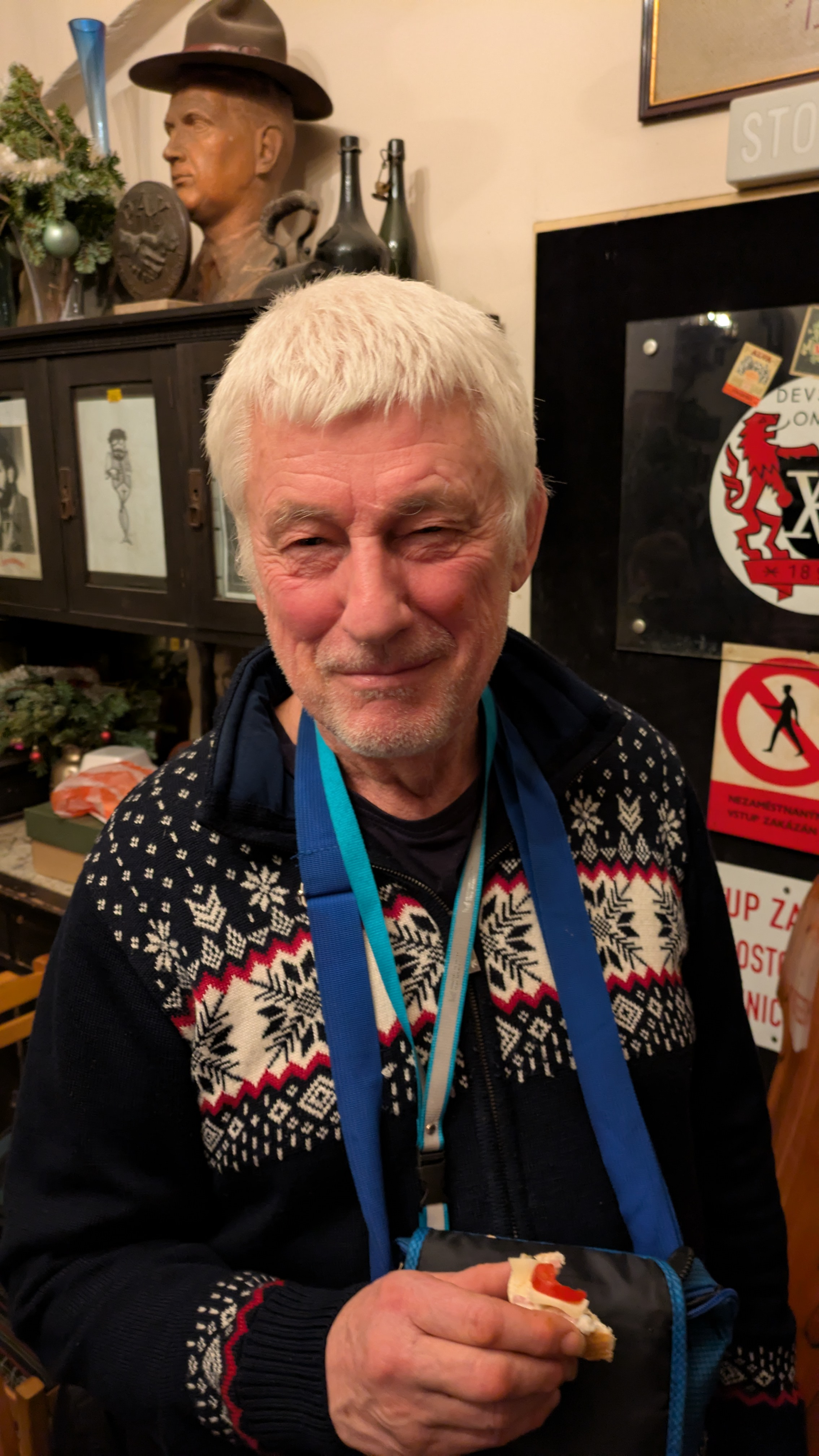
- Born: 29 March 1951; Havlíčkův Brod, Czechoslovakia
- Died: 2 April 2026 (aged 75); Skilfonna glacier, Svalbard, Norway
- Cause of death: Fall into a glacier crevasse
- Education: Czech Technical University
- Occupations: Polar explorer, mountaineer, expedition guide
- Known for: First Czech to reach the North Pole on skis (1993)

Miroslav Jakeš (29 March 1951 – 2 April 2026) was a Czech polar explorer, mountaineer and expedition guide. In May 1993, he became the first Czech to reach the North Pole on skis, and he subsequently led or accompanied around twenty expeditions to the pole, working closely with Russian polar staff at the Barneo ice camp.

Jakeš died on 2 April 2026 after falling into a crevasse on the Skilfonna glacier on Svalbard during a solo ski expedition. His body was recovered four days later from a depth of approximately 20 metres.

== Early life ==
Jakeš was born on 29 March 1951 in Havlíčkův Brod, in what was then Czechoslovakia, and studied mechanical engineering at the Czech Technical University in Prague. During his early life, he took a series of jobs largely for the latitude they gave him to take long absences for expeditions, including work as a labourer on drilling rigs, an office worker at the Kovohutě metalworks and at the national airline ČSA, a door-to-door salesman of Lux vacuum cleaners (one of which he later took to the North Pole), a building-site worker, a night watchman, and a tour guide in Africa.

== Career ==
=== Mountaineering and Antarctica ===
Jakeš was introduced to expedition travel by the Czech polar explorer Jaroslav Pavlíček, with whom he climbed in the Pamirs, the Caucasus, the Alps, and the Himalayas. In 1982, the pair set a Czechoslovak winter altitude record of 6,500 metres on Cho Oyu. In 1984, together with Pavlíček and Vladimír Weigner, he became part of the first Czechoslovak team to traverse Greenland from east to west. In 1989, he took part in the establishment of a Czechoslovak research station on Nelson Island in the South Shetland Islands, Antarctica.

In 1986, Jakeš became the first Czech to make a solo winter ascent of Aconcagua, the highest mountain in South America. On the descent, he suffered severe frostbite and lost toes.

=== Polar expeditions ===
Jakeš began Arctic expedition work in 1992 and in May 1993 became the first Czech to reach the geographic North Pole on skis, as part of the international Malakhov–Weber North Pole Light expedition that set out across the polar pack ice from Severnaya Zemlya. In 1996, he completed an unsupported solo crossing of Greenland without radio or satellite contact.

In later years, he worked principally as a polar guide, returning regularly to Svalbard, Greenland, and Iceland, and travelling repeatedly to Baffin Island, Alaska, Siberia, the Kamchatka Peninsula, and the Kola Peninsula. From the Barneo drifting ice camp, he led tourist groups and expeditions to the North Pole in cooperation with Russian polar staff. By his own count, he made about fifty visits to Svalbard, thirty to Greenland, and around twenty to the North Pole itself. A 2008 expedition with the filmmaker and traveller Petr Horký covered around 170 kilometres on the polar pack ice and was described in the Czech media as the longest Czech polar expedition.

A number of documentary films were produced from his expeditions, and he wrote and lectured widely about his experiences in Czech magazines, on radio, and on television.

== Death ==
In early March 2026, Jakeš travelled to Longyearbyen on Svalbard for a solo ski expedition through the archipelago's icefields and valleys. He last made contact, by satellite phone, on 30 March 2026, and stopped reporting on 1 April; on 6 April the office of the Governor of Svalbard received a missing-person report and a helicopter search began the same day. Searchers found one of his ski poles at the edge of a crevasse on the Skilfonna glacier on Edgeøya, and on 9 April his body was recovered from a depth of about 20 metres in the same crevasse. The Governor's office confirmed his identity publicly the following day, after consultation with his family.
