= Škoda Motorsport ERC results =

The table below shows all results of Škoda Motorsport in European Rally Championship.

== ERC results ==
Year	Entrant	Car	Driver	1	2	3	4	5	6	7	8	9	10	11	12	ERC	Points
2012	Škoda Motorsport	Škoda Fabia S2000	(Finland) Juho Hänninen	JÄN; 2	MIL; 4	CRO; 1	BUL	YPR; 1	BOS; 1	MAD; 7	CZE; 1	AST	POL	VAL		1st	203
2012	Škoda Motorsport	Škoda Fabia S2000	(Czech Republic) Jan Kopecký	JÄN; 1	MIL	CRO	BUL	YPR	BOS	MAD	CZE; Ret	AST	POL	VAL		-	-
2012	Škoda Motorsport	Škoda Fabia S2000	(Finland) Esapekka Lappi	JÄN	MIL	CRO	BUL	YPR	BOS	MAD	CZE	AST	POL; 1	VAL		-	-
2013	Škoda Motorsport	Škoda Fabia S2000	(Czech Republic) Jan Kopecký	JÄN; 1	LIE	CAN; 1	AZO; 1	COR; 2	YPR	ROM; 1	CZE; 1	POL; 3	CRO; 1	SAN	VAL	1st	287
2013	Škoda Motorsport	Škoda Fabia S2000	(Belgium) Freddy Loix	JÄN	LIE	CAN	AZO	COR	YPR; 1	ROM	CZE	POL	CRO	SAN	VAL	11th	37
2013	Škoda Motorsport	Škoda Fabia S2000	(Finland) Esapekka Lappi	JÄN	LIE	CAN	AZO	COR	YPR	ROM	CZE; Ret	POL	CRO	SAN; 2	VAL; 1	5th	64
2013	Škoda Motorsport	Škoda Fabia S2000	(Germany) Sepp Wiegand	JÄN	LIE	CAN	AZO	COR	YPR	ROM	CZE; 4	POL	CRO	SAN	VAL	27th	18
2014	Škoda Motorsport	Škoda Fabia S2000	(Finland) Esapekka Lappi	JÄN	LIE; 1	GRE; 4	IRE; 1	AZO	YPR; Ret	EST; 5	CZE; Ret	CYP	VAL; 1	COR; Ret		1st	162
2014	Škoda Auto Deutschland	Škoda Fabia S2000	(Germany) Sepp Wiegand	JÄN	LIE; 5	GRE; Ret	IRE; 2	AZO	YPR; 3	EST; 7	CZE; 2	CYP	VAL; 3	COR; DNS		2nd	128
2015	Škoda Motorsport	Škoda Fabia R5	(Czech Republic) Jan Kopecký	JÄN	LIE	IRE	AZO	YPR	EST	CZE; 1	CYP	GRE	VAL			8th	36
2016	Škoda Motorsport	Škoda Fabia R5	(Czech Republic) Jan Kopecký	CAN	IRE	GRE	AZO	YPR	EST	POL	ZLI; 1	LIE	CYP			6th	39
2017	Škoda Motorsport	Škoda Fabia R5	(Czech Republic) Jan Kopecký	AZO	CAN	ACR	CYP	POL	CZE; 1	RMC	LIE					9th	39
2018	Škoda Motorsport	Škoda Fabia R5	(Finland) Juuso Nordgren	AZO	CAN	ACR; 18	CYP; Ret	RMC; 7	CZE	POL	LIE					24th	13
2018	Škoda Motorsport	Škoda Fabia R5	(Czech Republic) Jan Kopecký	AZO	CAN	ACR	CYP	RMC	CZE; 1	POL	LIE					10th	38

== ERC Victories ==
No.	Event	Season	Driver	Co-driver	Car
1	45. Belgium Geko Ypres Rally 2010	2010	(Belgium) Freddy Loix	(Belgium) Fréderic Miclotte	Škoda Fabia S2000
2	(Portugal) 51. Rali Vinho da Madeira 2010	2010	(Czech Republic) Jan Kopecký	(Czech Republic) Petr Starý	Škoda Fabia S2000
3	(Switzerland) 52. Rallye International du Valais 2011	2011	(Czech Republic) Antonín Tlusťák	(Czech Republic) Jan Škaloud	Škoda Fabia S2000
4	(Austria) 29. Internationale Jänner Rallye 2012	2012	(Czech Republic) Jan Kopecký	(Czech Republic) Petr Starý	Škoda Fabia S2000
5	39. Croatia Rally 2012	2012	(Finland) Juho Hänninen	(Finland) Mikko Markkula	Škoda Fabia S2000
6	43. Rally Bulgaria 2012	2012	(Bulgaria) Dimitar Iliev	(Bulgaria) Yanaki Yanakiev	Škoda Fabia S2000
7	48. Belgium Geko Ypres Rally 2012	2012	(Finland) Juho Hänninen	(Finland) Mikko Markkula	Škoda Fabia S2000
8	(Turkey) 41. Bosphorus Rally 2012	2012	(Finland) Juho Hänninen	(Finland) Mikko Markkula	Škoda Fabia S2000
9	(Czech Republic) 42. Barum Czech Rally Zlín 2012	2012	(Finland) Juho Hänninen	(Finland) Mikko Markkula	Škoda Fabia S2000
10	(Poland) 69. Rajd Polski 2012	2012	(Finland) Esapekka Lappi	(Finland) Janne Ferm	Škoda Fabia S2000
11	(Austria) 30. Internationale Jänner Rallye 2013	2013	(Czech Republic) Jan Kopecký	(Czech Republic) Pavel Dresler	Škoda Fabia S2000
12	(Spain) 37. Rally Islas Canarias El Corte Inglés 2013	2013	(Czech Republic) Jan Kopecký	(Czech Republic) Pavel Dresler	Škoda Fabia S2000
13	(Portugal) 48. SATA Rallye Açores 2013	2013	(Czech Republic) Jan Kopecký	(Czech Republic) Pavel Dresler	Škoda Fabia S2000
14	49. Belgium Geko Ypres Rally 2013	2013	(Belgium) Freddy Loix	(Belgium) Frédéric Miclotte	Škoda Fabia S2000
15	(Romania) 2013 Sibiu Rally	2013	(Czech Republic) Jan Kopecký	(Czech Republic) Pavel Dresler	Škoda Fabia S2000
16	(Czech Republic) 2013 Barum Czech Rally Zlín	2013	(Czech Republic) Jan Kopecký	(Czech Republic) Pavel Dresler	Škoda Fabia S2000
17	40. Croatia Rally	2013	(Czech Republic) Jan Kopecký	(Czech Republic) Pavel Dresler	Škoda Fabia S2000
18	(Switzerland) 2013 Rallye International du Valais	2013	(Finland) Esapekka Lappi	(Finland) Janne Ferm	Škoda Fabia S2000
19	(Latvia) Rally Liepāja 2014	2014	(Finland) Esapekka Lappi	(Finland) Janne Ferm	Škoda Fabia S2000
20	(Northern Ireland) / (Republic of Ireland) 72. Circuit of Ireland 2014	2014	(Finland) Esapekka Lappi	(Finland) Janne Ferm	Škoda Fabia S2000
21	(Belgium) 50. Geko Ypres Rally 2014	2014	(Belgium) Freddy Loix	(Belgium) Johan Gitsels	Škoda Fabia S2000
22	(Switzerland) 55. Rallye International du Valais 2014	2014	(Finland) Esapekka Lappi	(Finland) Janne Ferm	Škoda Fabia S2000
23	(Belgium) 51. Kenotek Ypres Rally 2015	2015	(Belgium) Freddy Loix	(Netherlands) Johan Gitsels	Škoda Fabia R5
24	(Czech Republic) 45. Barum Czech Rally Zlín 2015	2015	(Czech Republic) Jan Kopecký	(Czech Republic) Pavel Dresler	Škoda Fabia R5
25	(Greece) 62. Seajets Acropolis Rally 2016	2016	(Latvia) Ralfs Sirmacis	(Latvia) Arturs Šimins	Škoda Fabia R5
26	(Belgium) 52. Kenotek by CID LINES Ypres Rally 2016	2016	(Belgium) Freddy Loix	(Netherlands) Johan Gitsels	Škoda Fabia R5
27	7. auto24 Rally Estonia 2016	2016	(Latvia) Ralfs Sirmacis	(Latvia) Māris Kulšs	Škoda Fabia R5
28	(Czech Republic) 46. Barum Czech Rally Zlín 2016	2016	(Czech Republic) Jan Kopecký	(Czech Republic) Pavel Dresler	Škoda Fabia R5
29	(Latvia) Rally Liepāja 2016	2016	(Latvia) Ralfs Sirmacis	(Latvia) Arturs Šimins	Škoda Fabia R5
30	(Portugal) 52. Azores Airlines Rallye 2017	2017	(Portugal) Bruno Magalhães	(Portugal) Hugo Magalhães	Škoda Fabia R5
31	(Czech Republic) 47. Barum Czech Rally Zlín 2017	2017	(Czech Republic) Jan Kopecký	(Czech Republic) Pavel Dresler	Škoda Fabia R5
32	(Latvia) Rally Liepāja 2017	2017	(Russia) Nikolay Gryazin	(Russia) Yaroslav Fedorov	Škoda Fabia R5
33	(Greece) 64. EKO Acropolis Rally 2018	2018	(Portugal) Bruno Magalhães	(Portugal) Hugo Magalhães	Škoda Fabia R5
34	47. Cyprus Rally 2018	2018	(Cyprus) Simos Galatariotis	(Cyprus) Antonis Ioannou	Škoda Fabia R5
35	(Czech Republic) 48. Barum Czech Rally Zlín 2018	2018	(Czech Republic) Jan Kopecký	(Czech Republic) Pavel Dresler	Škoda Fabia R5
36	75. PZM Rajd Polski - Rally Poland 2018	2018	(Russia) Nikolay Gryazin	(Russia) Yaroslav Fedorov	Škoda Fabia R5
37	(Latvia) Rally Liepāja 2018	2018	(Russia) Nikolay Gryazin	(Russia) Yaroslav Fedorov	Škoda Fabia R5
