= Ralfs Sirmacis =

Latvian rally driver

Ralfs Sirmacis is a rally driver from Latvia, and is the winner of multiple European Rally Championship events.

== ERC results ==
Year	Entrant	Car	1	2	3	4	5	6	7	8	9	10	11	12	Pos.	Points
2013	O Kartes Autosporta Akadēmija	Ford Fiesta R2	JÄN; 19	LIE	CAN	AZO	COR	YPR	ROM	CZE	POL	CRO	SAN	VAL	-	-
2014	Ralfs Sirmacis	Ford Fiesta R2	JÄN	LIE; 14	GRE	IRE	AZO	YPR	EST	CZE	CYP	VAL	COR		-	-
2015	Sports Racing Technologies	Peugeot 208 R2	JÄN	LIE; 9	IRE; 22	AZO; Ret	YPR; 26	EST; 10	CZE; 21	CYP	GRE	VAL			51st	3
2016	Sports Racing Technologies	Škoda Fabia R5	CAN	IRE	GRE; 1	AZO; Ret	YPR	EST; 1	POL	ZLI; Ret	LIE; 1	CYP; 3			3rd	134

=== ERC Junior results ===
Year	Entrant	Car	1	2	3	4	5	6	Pos.	Points
2015	Sports Racing Technologies	Peugeot 208 R2	LIE; 3	IRE; 6	AZO; Ret	YPR; 5	EST; 1	CZE; 2	2nd	104
