= Kajetan Kajetanowicz =

Polish rally driver (born 1979)

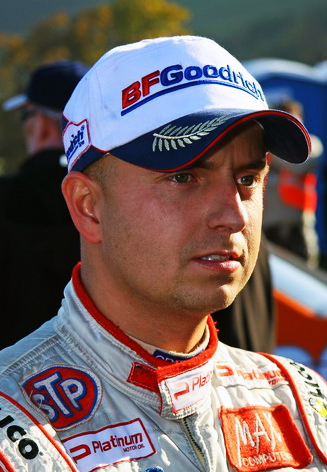

Personal information
- Nationality: (Poland) Polish
- Born: 5 March 1979 (age 47); Cieszyn, Poland

World Rally Championship record
- Years active: 2016, 2018–present
- Teams: Lotos Rally Team
- Rallies: 52
- Championships: 0
- Rally wins: 0
- Podiums: 0
- Stage wins: 0
- Total points: 43
- First rally: 2016 Rally Poland

Kajetan Kajetanowicz (Polish pronunciation: [kaˈjɛ.tan ka.jɛ.taˈnɔ.vit͡ʂ]; born 5 March 1979) is a Polish rally driver.

== Titles ==
Kajetanowicz is a four-time Poland Rally Champion (2010 2011, 2012, 2013). In 2012, he became champion in the Central European Zone Rally Championship. He also became the ERC European Drivers Champion in the 2015, 2016 and 2017 seasons with co-driver Jarosław Baran in Ford Fiesta R5 driving for Lotos Rally Team.

== Career highlights ==
Since 2013, Kajetanowicz has won six ERC rallies. His first major victory was in 2013, when he won the Rally Poland in a brand-new Ford Fiesta R5 for the Lotos Rally Team. It was Kajetanowicz's third win of the Rally Poland. He would beat previous Polish Rally Champion Bryan Bouffier in a Peugeot 207 S2000 and eventual European champion that season, Jan Kopecký, in a Škoda Fabia S2000. In 2014, Kajetanowicz made the full-time step-up to the ERC, with his rallying team Lotos Rally Team signing a customer support deal with M-Sport Poland. This would supply Kajetanowicz and his team with a factory-prepared Ford Fiesta R5. For the 2014 season, Kajetanowicz ended fourth in the European Championship with two podiums, finishing in third place in the 2014 Acropolis Rally and second place in the Cyprus Rally. In 2015, he won the ERC Drivers title over his main rival for the season, Peugeot factory driver Craig Breen, winning the Jänner Rallye, Cyprus Rally and the Acropolis Rally in the process. In 2016, he successfully defended his ERC title with a win at the Rajd Rzeszowski, three second places (2016 Rally Islas Canarias, 2016 Circuit of Ireland and 2016 Rally Estonia) and a third place at the Rallye Açores. In 2017, he claimed a third consecutive ERC championship with a win at the Acropolis Rally, and taking three second-place finishes at the Canary Islands, Rzeszowski, and Rome.

After four years of success in the European Championship, Kajetanowicz began the 2018 season with an uncertain future over sponsorship. It wouldn't be until May that his rally team announced a schedule for the 2018 season, with Kajetanowicz set to participate in four rounds of the World Rally Championship in the WRC-2 class. As a result, he would not return to defend his streak of ERC titles.

== Career results ==
=== WRC results ===
Year	Entrant	Car	1	2	3	4	5	6	7	8	9	10	11	12	13	14	WDC	Points
2016	Lotos Rally Team	Ford Fiesta R5	MON	SWE	MEX	ARG	POR	ITA	POL; 16	FIN	GER	CHN; C	FRA	ESP	GBR	AUS	NC	0
2018	Lotos Rally Team	Ford Fiesta R5	MON	SWE	MEX	FRA	ARG	POR	ITA; 23	FIN	GER; 13	TUR; 11	GBR	ESP; 15	AUS		NC	0
2019	Lotos Dynamic Rally Team	Volkswagen Polo GTI R5	MON	SWE	MEX	FRA; 13	ARG; Ret	CHL; WD	POR	ITA; 12	FIN	GER; 14		GBR; 42	ESP; 14	AUS; C	NC	0
2019	Lotos Dynamic Rally Team	Škoda Fabia R5											TUR; 12				NC	0
2020	Kajetan Kajetanowicz	Škoda Fabia R5 Evo	MON	SWE	MEX; 14	EST; Ret	TUR; 7	ITA; 9	MNZ; 14								16th	8
2021	Kajetan Kajetanowicz	Škoda Fabia R5 Evo	MON	ARC	CRO; 11	POR; 13	ITA; 16	KEN	EST; 13	BEL	GRE; 11	FIN	ESP; 14	MNZ; 12			NC	0
2022	Kajetan Kajetanowicz	Škoda Fabia Rally2 evo	MON	SWE	CRO; 8	POR; 11	ITA	KEN; 9	EST; 12	FIN	BEL	GRE	NZL; 8	ESP; 16	JPN; Ret		19th	10
2023	Kajetan Kajetanowicz	Škoda Fabia Rally2 evo	MON	SWE	MEX; 10	CRO	POR		KEN; 8	EST	FIN						16th	13
2023	Kajetan Kajetanowicz	Škoda Fabia RS Rally2						ITA; 7				GRE; 13	CHL; Ret	EUR; 12	JPN; 9		16th	13
2024	Kajetan Kajetanowicz	Škoda Fabia RS Rally2	MON	SWE	KEN; 10	CRO	POR	ITA; 10	POL; 35	LAT	FIN	GRE; 7	CHL; 12	EUR; 10	JPN; 11		17th	9
2025	Kajetan Kajetanowicz	Toyota GR Yaris Rally2	MON	SWE	KEN; 13	ESP	POR; 20	ITA; 10	GRE; 9	EST	FIN	PAR; 23	CHL; 14	EUR	JPN	SAU; 19	19th	3

=== WRC-2 Results ===
Year	Entrant	Car	1	2	3	4	5	6	7	8	9	10	11	12	13	14	WDC	Points
2016	Lotos Rally Team	Ford Fiesta R5	MON	SWE	MEX	ARG	POR	ITA	POL; 4	FIN	GER	CHN; C	FRA	ESP	GBR	AUS	28th	12
2018	Lotos Rally Team	Ford Fiesta R5	MON	SWE	MEX	FRA	ARG	POR	ITA; 7	FIN	GER; 5	TUR; 4	GBR	ESP; 4	AUS		10th	40
2019	Lotos Dynamic Rally Team	Volkswagen Polo GTI R5	MON	SWE	MEX	FRA; 3	ARG; Ret	CHL; WD	POR	ITA; 2	FIN	GER; 3		GBR; 12	ESP; 3	AUS; C	2nd	88
2019	Lotos Dynamic Rally Team	Škoda Fabia R5											TUR; 1				2nd	88
2022	Kajetan Kajetanowicz	Škoda Fabia Rally2 evo	MON	SWE	CRO; 2	POR; 2	ITA	KEN; 1	EST; 5	FIN	BEL	GRE	NZL; 2	ESP; 6	JPN; Ret		3rd	104
2023	Kajetan Kajetanowicz	Škoda Fabia Rally2 evo	MON	SWE	MEX; 4	CRO	POR		KEN; 1	EST	FIN						5th	95
2023	Kajetan Kajetanowicz	Škoda Fabia RS Rally2						ITA; 3				GRE; 6	CHL; Ret	EUR; 3	JPN; 3		5th	95
2024	Kajetan Kajetanowicz	Škoda Fabia RS Rally2	MON	SWE	KEN; 3	CRO	POR	ITA; 5	POL; 19	LAT	FIN	GRE; 4	CHL; 5	EUR; 4	JPN; 5		5th	69
2025	Kajetan Kajetanowicz	Toyota GR Yaris Rally2	MON	SWE	KEN; 6	ESP	POR; 10	ITA; 2	GRE; 4	EST	FIN	PAR; 13	CHL; 6	EUR	JPN	SAU; 6	9th	54

=== WRC-3 results ===
Year	Entrant	Car	1	2	3	4	5	6	7	8	9	10	11	12	Pos.	Points
2020	Kajetan Kajetanowicz	Škoda Fabia R5 Evo	MON	SWE	MEX; 4	EST; Ret	TUR; 1	ITA; 2	MNZ; 5						3rd	65
2021	Kajetan Kajetanowicz	Škoda Fabia R5 Evo	MON	ARC	CRO; 1	POR; 1	ITA; 8	KEN	EST; 2	BEL	GRE; 1	FIN	ESP; 2	MNZ; 3	2nd	127

=== ERC results ===
Year	Team	Car	1	2	3	4	5	6	7	8	9	10	11	12	Pos.	Points
2012	Lotos Rally Team	Subaru Impreza STi R4	AUT	ITA	CRO	BUL	BEL	TUR	POR	CZE	ESP	POL; 4	SUI		—	13
2013	Lotos Rally Team	Subaru Impreza STi R4	AUT; 6	LVA	ESP	POR	FRA	BEL	ROM	CZE					7th	50
2013	Lotos Rally Team	Ford Fiesta R5									POL; 1	CRO	ITA	SUI	7th	50
2014	Lotos Rally Team	Ford Fiesta R5	AUT; Ret	LVA; 4	GRE; 3	IRL	POR; Ret	BEL	EST	CZE; 6	CYP; 2	SUI; Ret	FRA; Ret		4th	100
2015	Lotos Rally Team	Ford Fiesta R5	AUT; 1	LVA; Ret	IRL; 2	POR; 2	BEL	EST; 2	CZE; 3	CYP; 1	GRE; 1	SUI			1st	230
2016	Lotos Rally Team	Ford Fiesta R5	ESP; 2	IRL; 2	GRE; 8	POR; 3	BEL	EST; 2	POL; 1	CZE; 47	LVA; 4	CYP			1st	181
2017	Lotos Rally Team	Ford Fiesta R5	POR; 27	ESP; 2	GRE; 1	CPR; 14	POL; 2	CZE; 5	ITA; 2	LVA; Ret					1st	145

Sporting positions
Preceded by Esapekka Lappi	European Rally Champion; 2015-2017	Succeeded by Aleksey Lukyanuk
