= Andreas Aigner =

Austrian rally driver (born 1984)

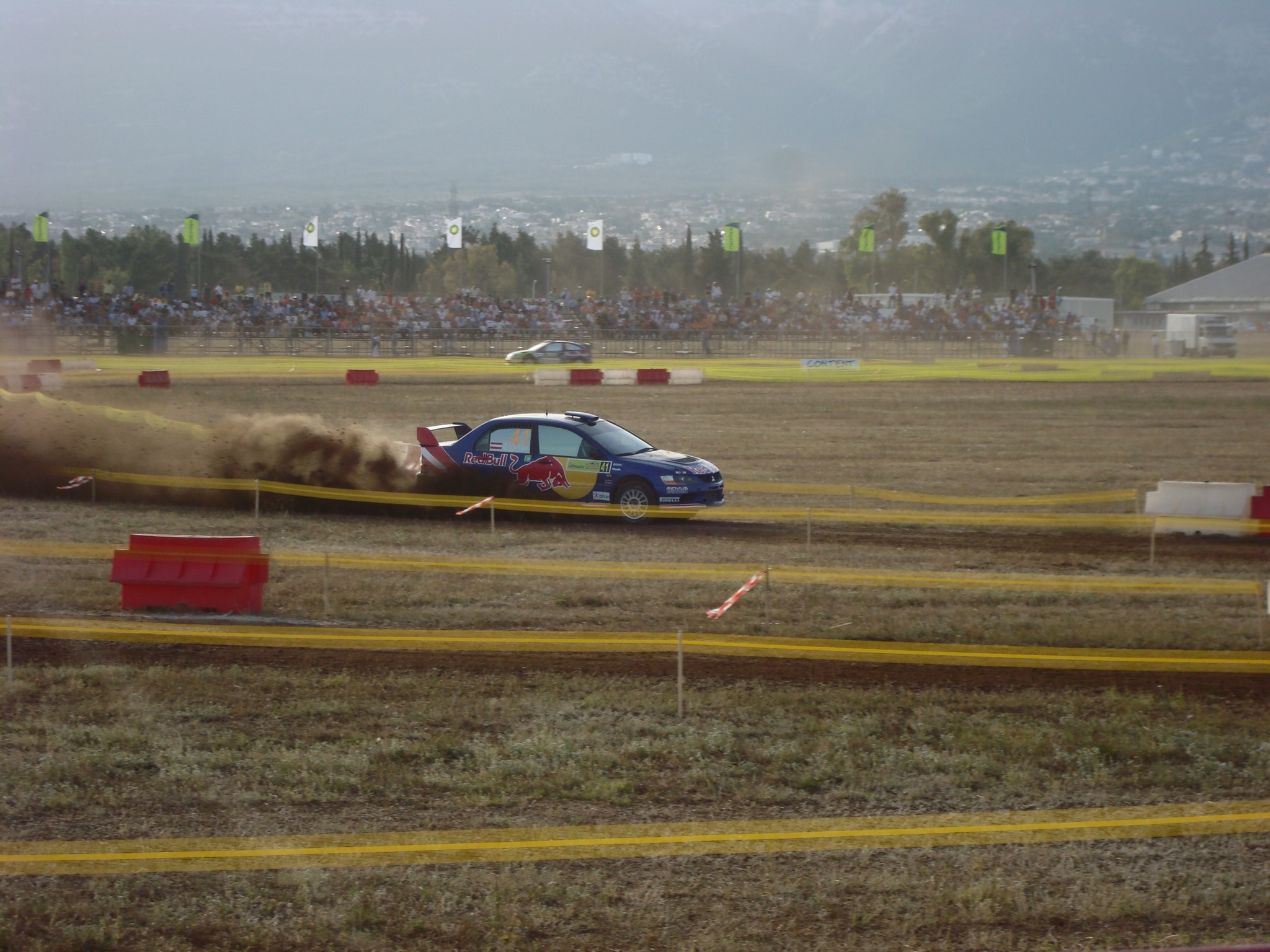

Personal information
- Nationality: (Austria) Austrian
- Born: September 24, 1984 (age 42)

World Rally Championship record
- Years active: 2005–2008, 2012
- Co-driver: (Germany) Timo Gottschalk (Germany) Klaus Wicha (Germany) Detlef Ruf
- Teams: Red Bull
- Rallies: 31
- Championships: 0
- Rally wins: 0
- Podiums: 0
- Stage wins: 0
- Total points: 4
- First rally: 2005 Cyprus Rally
- Last rally: 2012 Rallye de France

Andreas Aigner (born 24 September 1984 in Leoben) is an Austrian rally driver. He won the Production World Rally Championship (PWRC) in the 2008 season.

== Career ==
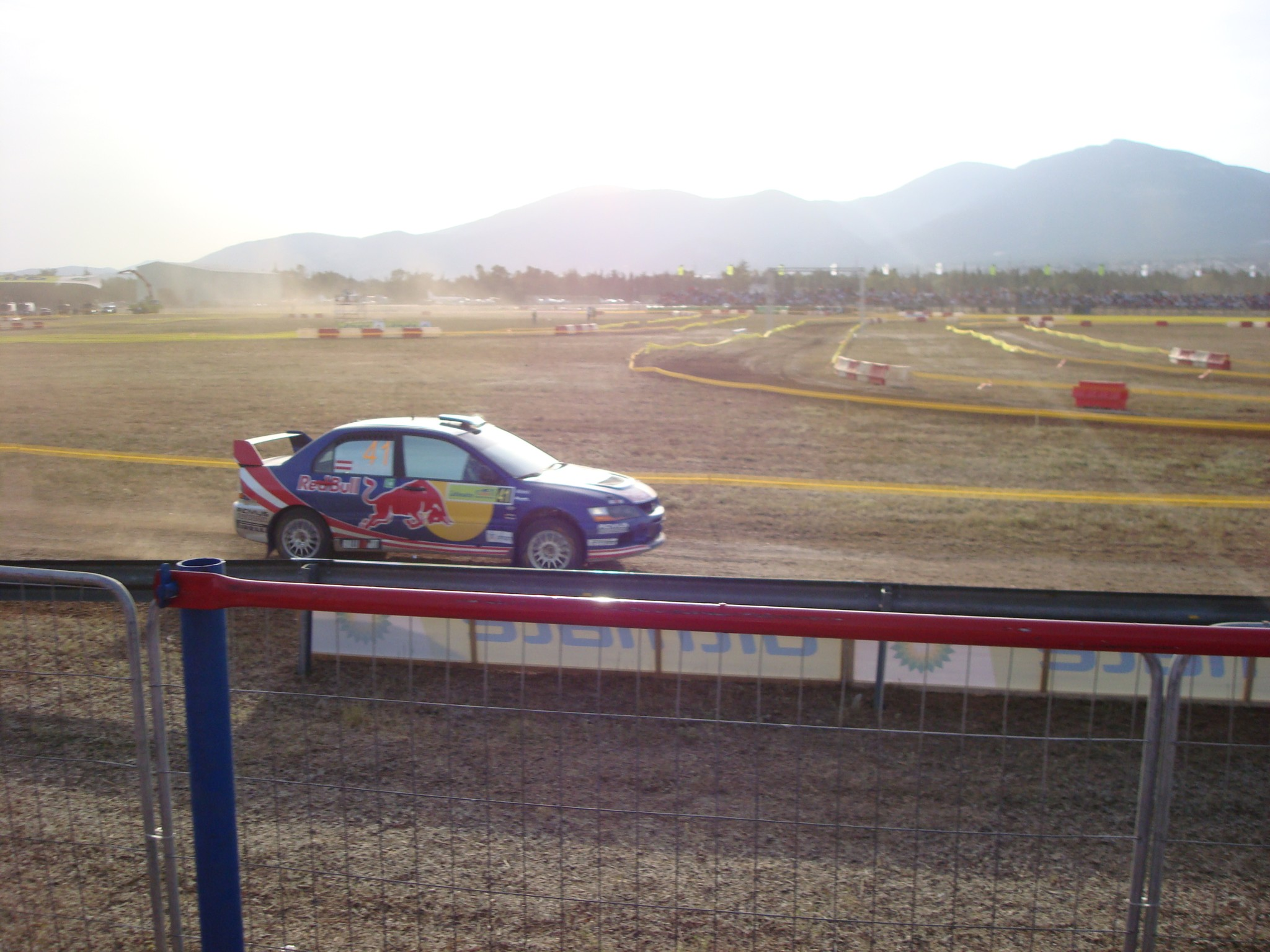
Aigner on his way to winning the PWRC class at the 2008 Acropolis Rally.

Aigner made his World Rally Championship debut in 2005, finishing 19th on the Cyprus Rally driving a Mitsubishi Lancer Evolution VIII. He competed in three further WRC events that year. For 2006, he signed for Armin Schwarz's Red Bull Škoda team, with Harri Rovanperä as teammate, driving a Škoda Fabia on ten WRC rounds. He scored his first WRC points on Rallye Deutschland, with a sixth-place finish.

In 2007, Aigner began competing in the Production World Rally Championship (PWRC), finishing 13th in the standings, driving a Red Bull-backed Mitsubishi Lancer Evolution IX. In 2008 he won the PWRC class on Rally Argentina (where he finished eighth overall), Acropolis Rally and Rally of Turkey, winning the PWRC crown.

In 2012, Aigner competed in the Super 2000 World Rally Championship (S-WRC).

== Career results ==
=== Complete WRC results ===
| Year | Entrant | Car | 1 | 2 | 3 | 4 | 5 | 6 | 7 | 8 | 9 | 10 | 11 | 12 | 13 | 14 | 15 | 16 | WDC | Points |
|---|---|---|---|---|---|---|---|---|---|---|---|---|---|---|---|---|---|---|---|---|
| 2005 | Andreas Aigner | Mitsubishi Lancer Evo VIII | MON | SWE | MEX | NZL | ITA | CYP; 19 | TUR; Ret | GRE | ARG | FIN | GER; Ret | GBR; 25 | JPN | FRA | ESP | AUS | NC | 0 |
| 2006 | Red Bull Škoda | Škoda Fabia WRC | MON; 13 | SWE; Ret | MEX | ESP; 13 | FRA; 15 | ARG | ITA; 13 | GRE; 14 | GER; 6 | FIN | JPN | CYP; Ret | TUR; 10 | AUS | NZL | GBR; Ret | 23rd | 3 |
| 2007 | Andreas Aigner | Mitsubishi Lancer Evo IX | MON; Ret | SWE; 30 | NOR; 20 | | | | | | | | | ESP; 19 | FRA; 32 | JPN | | | NC | 0 |
| 2007 | Red Bull Rallye Team | Mitsubishi Lancer Evo IX | | | | MEX; 24 | POR | ARG; 17 | ITA | GRE; 16 | FIN | GER | NZL | | | | IRE; Ret | GBR; 28 | NC | 0 |
| 2008 | Red Bull Rallye Team | Mitsubishi Lancer Evo IX | MON | SWE; 31 | MEX | ARG; 8 | JOR | ITA | GRE; 14 | TUR; 11 | | GER | NZL; Ret | ESP | FRA | JPN | GBR; 13 | | 20th | 1 |
| 2008 | Andreas Aigner | Mitsubishi Lancer Evo IX | | | | | | | | | FIN; Ret | | | | | | | | 20th | 1 |
| 2012 | Proton Motorsports | Proton Satria Neo S2000 | MON | SWE | MEX | POR | ARG | GRE | NZL | FIN | GER | GBR | FRA; 29 | ITA | ESP | | | | NC | 0 |

==== PWRC results ====
| Year | Entrant | Car | 1 | 2 | 3 | 4 | 5 | 6 | 7 | 8 | Pos. | Points |
|---|---|---|---|---|---|---|---|---|---|---|---|---|
| 2007 | Andreas Aigner | Mitsubishi Lancer Evo IX | SWE; 9 | | | | | | | | 13th | 10 |
| 2007 | Red Bull Rallye Team | Mitsubishi Lancer Evo IX | | MEX; 11 | ARG; 7 | GRE; 2 | NZL | JPN | IRE; Ret | GBR; 9 | 13th | 10 |
| 2008 | Red Bull Rallye Team | Mitsubishi Lancer Evo IX | SWE; 14 | ARG; 1 | GRE; 1 | TUR; 1 | FIN | NZL; Ret | JPN | GBR; 2 | 1st | 38 |

==== S-WRC results ====
| Year | Entrant | Car | 1 | 2 | 3 | 4 | 5 | 6 | 7 | 8 | Pos. | Points |
|---|---|---|---|---|---|---|---|---|---|---|---|---|
| 2012 | Proton Motorsports | Proton Satria Neo S2000 | MON | SWE | POR | NZL | FIN | GBR | FRA; 4 | ESP | 11th | 12 |

=== IRC results ===
| Year | Entrant | Car | 1 | 2 | 3 | 4 | 5 | 6 | 7 | 8 | 9 | 10 | 11 | 12 | 13 | Pos. | Points |
|---|---|---|---|---|---|---|---|---|---|---|---|---|---|---|---|---|---|
| 2008 | Red Bull Rallye Team | Mitsubishi Lancer Evo IX | IST | POR; 8 | YPR | RUS | MAD | ZLI | AST | SAN | VAL | CHN | | | | 35th | 1 |
| 2011 | Dytko Sport | Mitsubishi Lancer Evolution X | MON; Ret | CAN | COR | UKR | YPR | AZO | ZLI | MEC | SAN | SCO | CYP | | | NC | 0 |
| 2012 | Stohl Racing | Subaru Impreza STi R4 | AZO | CAN | IRL | COR; 12 | ITA | YPR; 9 | SMR | ROM; Ret | ZLI; 7 | YAL | SLI | SAN | CYP; 14 | 40th | 10 |

=== European Rally Championship results ===
| Year | Entrant | Car | 1 | 2 | 3 | 4 | 5 | 6 | 7 | 8 | 9 | 10 | 11 | 12 | Pos. | Points |
|---|---|---|---|---|---|---|---|---|---|---|---|---|---|---|---|---|
| 2013 | Stohl Racing | Subaru Impreza STi R4 | JÄN | LIE | CAN; 4^{6} | AZO | COR; 7^{1} | YPR; 11^{3} | ROM | ZLÍ | POL | CRO; 2^{11} | SAN; 11 | VAL; Ret^{6} | 6th | 57 |
