= Václav Pech =

Czech professional rally driver (born 1976)

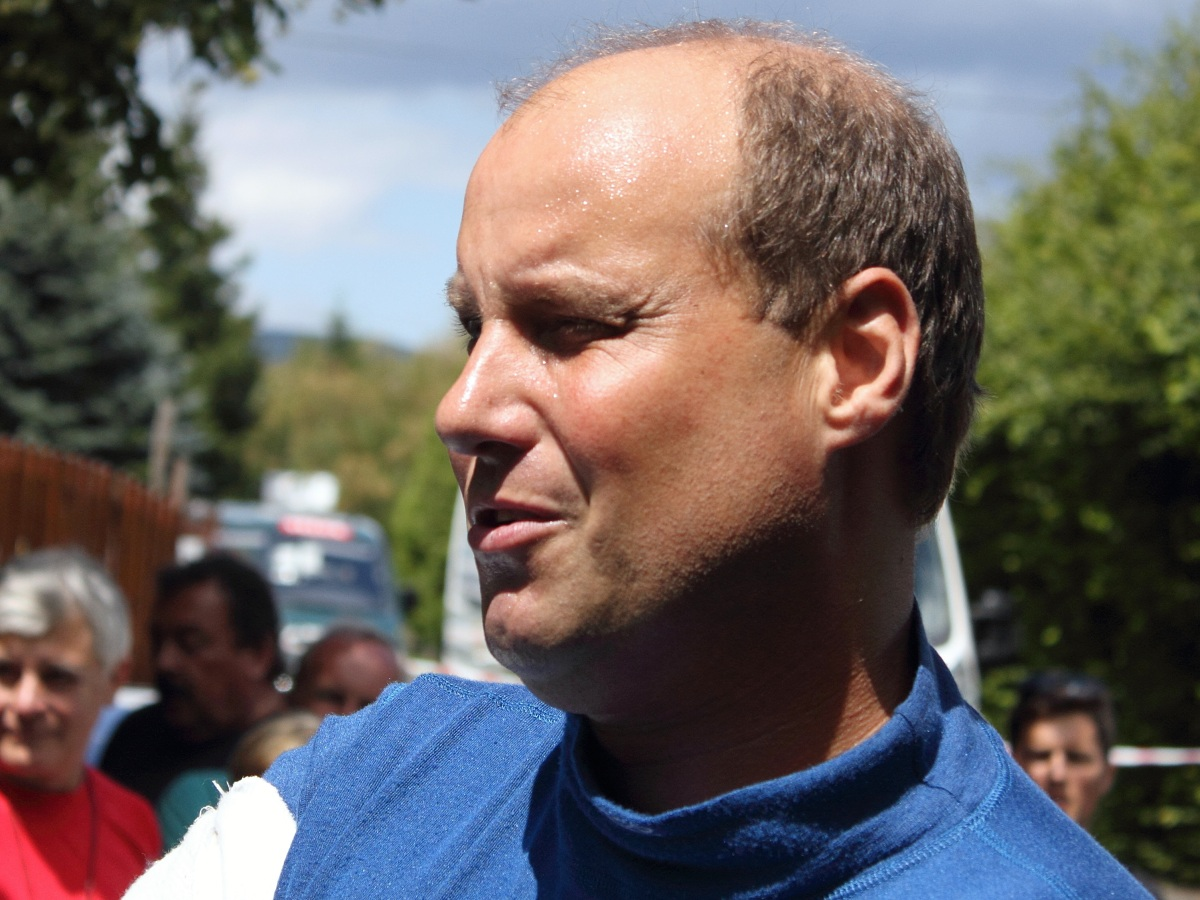
- Pech in 2016

Personal information
- Nationality: (Czech Republic) Czech
- Born: December 3, 1976 (age 49); Plzeň, Czechoslovakia

Václav Pech (born 3 December 1976) is a Czech professional rally driver. He has won multiple Czech Rally Championships and winner of six rallies of European Rally Championship.

== IRC results ==
Year	Entrant	Car	1	2	3	4	5	6	7	8	9	10	11	12	Pos	Points
2007	(Czech Republic) Euro Oil Team	Mitsubishi Lancer Evo IX	KEN	TUR	BEL	RUS	POR	CZE; 3	ITA	SWI	CHI				14th	6
2008	(Czech Republic) EuroOil Čepro Czech National Team	Mitsubishi Lancer Evo IX	TUR	POR	BEL	RUS	POR	CZE; Ret	ESP	ITA	SWI	CHI			-	0
2009	(Czech Republic) EuroOil Čepro Czech National Team	Mitsubishi Lancer Evo IX	MON	BRA	KEN	POR	BEL	RUS	POR	CZE; 8	ESP	ITA	SCO		48th	1
2010	(Czech Republic) EuroOil Čepro Czech National Team	Mitsubishi Lancer Evo IX	MON	CUR	ARG	CAN	SAR	YPR	AZO	MAD	ZLI; 6	SAN	SCO	CYP	34th	3
2011	(Czech Republic) EuroOil Čepro Czech National Team	Mitsubishi Lancer Evo IX R4	MON	CAN	COR	YAL	YPR	AZO	ZLI; Ret	MEC	SAN	SCO	CYP		-	0

== ERC results ==
Year	Entrant	Car	1	2	3	4	5	6	7	8	9	10	11	12	Pos.	Points
2013	EuroOil Invelt Team	Mini Cooper S2000 1.6T	JÄN; 4	LIE	CAN	AZO	COR	YPR	ROM	CZE; 2	POL	CRO	SAN	VAL	8th	49
2014	EuroOil Invelt Team	Mini Cooper S2000 1.6T	JÄN; 2	LIE	GRE	IRE	AZO	YPR	EST	CZE; 1	CYP	VAL	COR		5th	63
2015	EuroOil Invelt Czech National Team	Mini Cooper S2000 1.6T	JÄN	LIE	IRE	AZO	YPR	EST	CZE; Ret	CYP	GRE	VAL			12th	29
2017	EuroOil Invelt Team	Ford Fiesta R5	AZO	CAN	ACR	CYP	POL	CZE; Ret	RMC	LIE					-	0
2018	EuroOil Invelt Team	Ford Fiesta R5	AZO	CAN	ACR	CYP	RMC	CZE; Ret	POL	LIE					-	0

== Czech Rally Championship results ==
Year	Entrant	Car	1	2	3	4	5	6	7	8	9	10	11	12	MMČR	Points
1998	Thorn Racing	Subaru Impreza WRX	ŠUM; Ret	SEV	ÚSL; 8	KRU; 18	MAG; 10	BOH; Ret	BAR; Ret	AGR; 5	VAL	HOR	PŘÍ; Ret	3ST; 5	19th	173
1999	Thorn Racing	Subaru Impreza WRX	ŠUM; 8	LIB; 3	ÚSL; 2	KRU; 10	VYŠ; Ret	BOH; 7	BAR; Ret	AGR; 5	VAL; 5	HOR	PŘÍ; Ret		7th	339
2000	Thorn Racing	Subaru Impreza WRX	ŠUM; 5	LIB; 9	KRU; Ret	BOH; 7	BAR; Ret	PŘÍ; 14							10th	131
2001	Pemex - IVP	Toyota Corolla WRC	ŠUM; 3	VAL; 2	KRU; 3	BOH; Ret	BAR; 3	PŘÍ; 3	TŘE; 6						2nd	162
2002	Barum Rally Team	Ford Focus RS WRC '01	ŠUM; 3	VAL; 5	KRU; 1	BOH; 2	BAR; 4	PŘÍ; 1	TŘE						1st	448
2003	Czech National Eurooil Team	Ford Focus RS WRC '02	ŠUM; 2	VAL; 1	KRU; 1	BOH; 4	BAR; 1	PŘÍ	TŘE						1st	129
2004	Euro Oil Team	Ford Focus RS WRC '02	JÄN; 3	ŠUM; 5	TAT; 2	KRU; 2	BOH; 3	BAR; 2		TŘE; 2					2nd	170
2004	Euro Oil Team	Ford Focus RS WRC '03							PŘÍ; 2						2nd	170
2005	Euro Oil Team	Ford Focus RS WRC '02	JÄN; 1	ŠUM; Ret	VAL; 1	TAT; 1	KRU; 2	BOH; 2	BAR; 4	PŘÍ; 3	TŘE; Ret				1st	172
2005	Euro Oil Team	Mitsubishi Lancer Evo VII							BAR; 4						1st	172
2006	Czech National Team	Mitsubishi Lancer Evo IX	JÄN; Ret	ŠUM; 5	TAT; 1	KRU; 1	BOH; 1	BAR; 2	TŘE; 1	PŘÍ; 1					1st	186
2007	EuroOil Čepro Czech National Team	Mitsubishi Lancer Evo IX	JÄN; 1	ŠUM; 1	KRU; Ret	BOH; 2	HOR; 1	BAR; 3	PŘÍ; 1						1st	163
2008	EuroOil Team	Mitsubishi Lancer Evo IX	JÄN; 1	VAL; 2	ŠUM; Ret	KRU; 2	HUS; 1	TŘE; 1	BOH; Ret	BAR; Ret	PŘÍ; 1				2nd	255
2009	EuroOil Čepro Czech National Team	Mitsubishi Lancer Evo IX	VAL; 3	ŠUM; 1	KRU; 2	HUS; 2	BAR; 6	PŘÍ; 1	BOH; 3						2nd	216
2010	EuroOil Čepro Czech National Team	Mitsubishi Lancer Evo IX	VAL; 2	ŠUM; 4	KRU; 2	HUS; 1	BOH; 3	BAR; 2	PŘÍ; 3						2nd	225
2011	EuroOil Čepro Czech National Team	Mitsubishi Lancer Evo IX R4	VAL; 4	ŠUM -	KRU; 3	HUS; 3	BOH; Ret	BAR; Ret	PŘÍ; 2						3rd	127
2012	EuroOil Invelt Team	Mini Cooper S2000 1.6T	JÄN; 2	VAL; 3	ŠUM; Ret	KRU; 3	HUS; Ret	BOH -	BAR; Ret	PŘÍ; Ret					5th	100
2013	EuroOil Invelt Team	Mini Cooper S2000 1.6T	JÄN; 2	ŠUM; 1	KRU; 1	HUS; 2	BOH; 2	BAR; 2	PŘÍ -						1st	404
2014	EuroOil Invelt Team	Mini Cooper S2000 1.6T	JÄN; 1	KRU; 1	ŠUM; 1	HUS; 1	BOH; Ret	BAR; 1	PŘÍ; 1						1st	468
2015	EuroOil Invelt Czech National Team	Mini Cooper S2000 1.6T	ŠUM; Ret	KRU; 2	HUS; 2	BOH; 2	BAR; 2	KLA; Ret							2nd	289
2016	EuroOil Invelt Czech National Team	Porsche 997 GT3 RS 3.8	ŠUM; 5	KRU; Ret	HUS; Ret	BOH; 2	BAR; Ret	PŘÍ; 2							5th	129
2017	EuroOil Invelt Team	Ford Fiesta R5	VAL; 2	ŠUM; 2	KRU; 2	HUS; 2	BOH; 2	BAR; Ret	PŘÍ; 2						2nd	232
2018	EuroOil Invelt Team	Ford Fiesta R5	VAL; 2	ŠUM; 10	KRU; 2	HUS; DNS	BOH; 2	BAR; Ret	PŘÍ; 1						2nd	206
2018	EuroOil Invelt Team	Ford Fiesta R5	VAL; 2	ŠUM; 10	KRU; 2	HUS; DNS	BOH; 2	BAR; Ret	PŘÍ; 1						2nd	
2019	EuroOil Invelt Team	Ford Fiesta R5	VAL; 2	ŠUM; 1	KRU -	HUS -	BOH -	BAR -	PŘÍ -						2nd	
