= Sepp Wiegand =

German rally driver (born 1991)

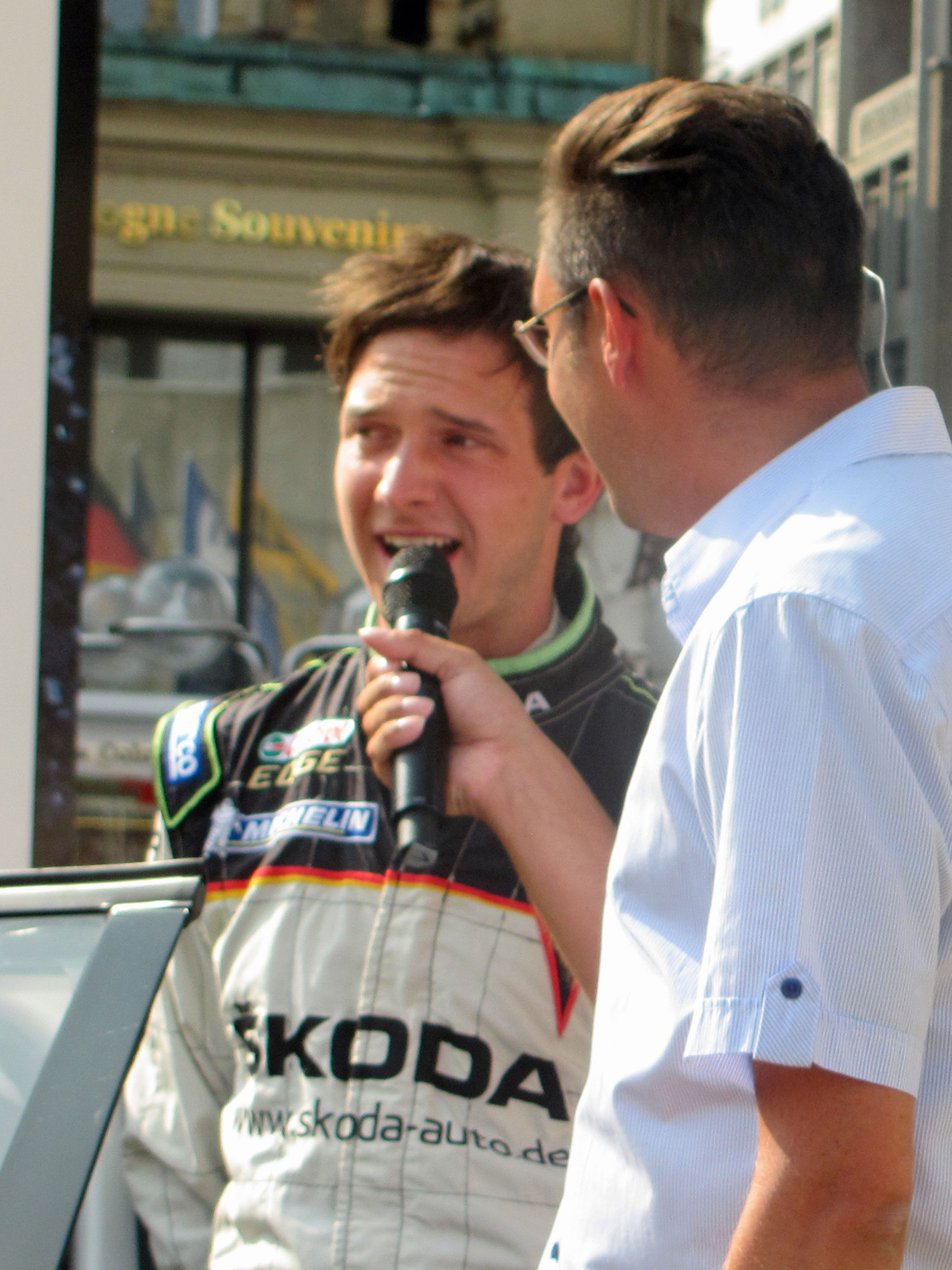

Personal information
- Nationality: (Germany) German
- Born: January 9, 1991 (age 35); Zwönitz, Saxony, Germany

World Rally Championship record
- Years active: 2011–2013
- Teams: Škoda Auto Deutschland, Volkswagen Motorsport
- Rallies: 10
- Rally wins: 0
- Podiums: 0
- Stage wins: 0
- Total points: 4
- First rally: 2011 Rallye Deutschland
- Last rally: 2013 Rally Catalunya

Sepp Wiegand (born January 9, 1991, in Zwönitz) is a German rally driver. He competed in most events of the Intercontinental Rally Challenge in 2012.

== Career results ==
=== WRC results ===
Year	Entrant	Car	1	2	3	4	5	6	7	8	9	10	11	12	13	Pos.	Points
2011	Volkswagen Motorsport	Škoda Fabia S2000	SWE	MEX	POR	JOR	ITA	ARG	GRE	FIN	GER	AUS	FRA	ESP	GBR; Ret	NC	0
2012	Volkswagen Motorsport	Škoda Fabia S2000	MON	SWE	MEX	POR	ARG	GRE	NZL	FIN	GER; Ret	GBR	FRA	ITA	ESP	NC	0
2013	Škoda Auto Deutchsland	Škoda Fabia S2000	MON; 8	SWE; 13	MEX	POR; 14	ARG	GRE	ITA; Ret	FIN	GER; 14	AUS	FRA	ESP; Ret	GBR; WD	22nd	4

==== WRC Academy results ====
Year	Entrant	1	2	3	4	5	6	Pos.	Points
2011	MC Grünhain	POR	ITA	FIN	GER; 7	FRA; 4	GBR	NC†	0†

† Ineligible to score points.

==== WRC 2 results ====
Year	Entrant	Car	1	2	3	4	5	6	7	8	9	10	11	12	13	Pos.	Points
2013	Škoda Auto Deutchsland	Škoda Fabia S2000	MON; 1	SWE; 3	MEX	POR; 3	ARG	GRE	ITA; Ret	FIN	GER; 4	AUS	FRA	ESP; Ret	GBR; WD	6th	67

=== Complete IRC results ===
Year	Entrant	Car	1	2	3	4	5	6	7	8	9	10	11	12	13	Pos	Points
2012	(Germany) Škoda Auto Deutschland	Škoda Fabia S2000	AZO; 4	CAN; 4	IRL; 7	COR; 8	TAR; 7	YPR	SMR; 4	ROM; Ret	ZLI; 10	YAL	SLI	SAN	CYP; 5	4th	73

=== ERC results ===
Year	Entrant	Car	1	2	3	4	5	6	7	8	9	10	11	12	Pos	Points
2013	(Czech Republic) Škoda Motorsport	Škoda Fabia S2000	JÄN	LIE	CAN	AZO	COR	YPR	ROM	CZE; 4	POL	CRO	SAN	VAL	27th	18
2014	(Germany) Škoda Auto Deutschland	Škoda Fabia S2000	AUT	LIE; 5	ACR; Ret	IRL; 2	AZO	YPR; 3	EST; 7	ZLI; 2	CYP	ROU	VAL; 3	FRA	2nd	128
