= Eric Borguet =

American physicist

Eric Borguet from the Temple University, was awarded the status of Fellow in the American Physical Society, after they were nominated by their Division of Chemical Physics in 2009, for "his seminal contributions to our understanding of optical, molecular and electronic phenomena at buried interfaces, complex interfaces, and nanosystems; and for the development of novel experimental tools and methodologies, particularly the development of fluorescent labeling of surface species."

== Early years and education ==
He was born in Dublin, Ireland. In that place he spent his formative years.

He attended college in France at the Université de Paris-Sud. Thereafter he studied chemistry and physics.

In Philadelphia, Pennsylvania in the USA, in 1993 he obtained Ph.D. (Physical Chemistry). He investigated adsorption and intermolecular interactions on stepped metal surfaces. Then he studied in Columbia University, where he carried out nonlinear optical studies of spectroscopy and ultrafast dynamics at liquid interfaces.

He have resulted in over 130 peer-reviewed publications, more than 250 invited talks and more than 235 contributed presentations.

== University activities ==
Eric Borguet has mentored 26 graduate students, advised over 75 undergraduate researchers, many of whom have continued to graduate studies. His group has welcomed 12 visiting graduate students, as well as 5 sabbatical visiting scholars. He has supervised the training of 16 post-doctoral fellows.

== See also ==
- List of fellows of the American Physical Society (1998–2010)
