= 2013 European Rally Championship =

Seasons
- ← 2012 2014 →

The 2013 European Rally Championship season was the 61st season of the FIA European Rally Championship, the European continental championship series in rallying. The season was also the first following the merger between the European Rally Championship and the Intercontinental Rally Challenge. French broadcaster Eurosport, which previously organised the IRC, assumed the duties of organising the ERC.

The season started in Austria on 3 January, with the running of the Internationale Jänner Rallye, and finished on 9 November at the International Rallye du Valais. Jan Kopecký won the Championship after scoring a total of six victories and two more podium finishes.

== Calendar ==
The calendar for the 2013 season featured twelve rallies, which were drawn from the 2012 European Rally Championship and Intercontinental Rally Challenge calendars. A final calendar of thirteen events was confirmed on 15 December 2012, however in April 2013 Rally San Marino lost its place on the calendar.

Round	Dates	Rally name	Surface
1	16–19 January	(Austria) Internationale Jänner Rallye	Mixed
2	1–3 February	(Latvia) Rally Liepāja-Ventspils	Mixed
3	21–23 March	(Spain) Rally Islas Canarias El Corte Inglés	Tarmac
4	25–27 April	(Portugal) Rallye Açores	Gravel
5	16–18 May	(France) Tour de Corse	Tarmac
6	27–29 June	(Belgium) Ypres Rally	Tarmac
7	25–27 July	Sibiu Rally Romania	Gravel
8	30 August–1 September	(Czech Republic) Barum Czech Rally Zlín	Tarmac
9	13–15 September	Rally Poland	Gravel
10	26–28 September	Croatia Rally	Tarmac
11	10–12 October	(Italy) Rallye Sanremo	Tarmac
12	7–9 November	(Switzerland) Rallye International du Valais	Tarmac

== Selected entries ==
The following teams and drivers represent the major entries participating in the 2013 season:

Constructor	Car	Entrant	Driver	Co-driver	Rounds
Škoda	Škoda Fabia S2000	(Czech Republic) Škoda Motorsport	(Czech Republic) Jan Kopecký	(Czech Republic) Pavel Dresler	1, 3–5, 7–10
Škoda	Škoda Fabia S2000	(Czech Republic) Škoda Motorsport	(Portugal) Ricardo Moura	(Portugal) Sancho Eiró	4
Škoda	Škoda Fabia S2000	(Czech Republic) Škoda Motorsport	(Belgium) Freddy Loix	(Belgium) Frédéric Miclotte	6
Škoda	Škoda Fabia S2000	(Czech Republic) Škoda Motorsport	(Finland) Esapekka Lappi	(Finland) Janne Ferm	8, 11–12
Škoda	Škoda Fabia S2000	(Czech Republic) Škoda Motorsport	(Germany) Sepp Wiegand	(Germany) Frank Christian	8
Škoda	Škoda Fabia S2000	(Austria) BRR Team	(Austria) Raimund Baumschlager	(Germany) Klaus Wicha	1
Škoda	Škoda Fabia S2000	(Austria) BRR Team	(South Africa) Henk Lategan	(South Africa) Barry White	10
Škoda	Škoda Fabia S2000	(Czech Republic) GPD Mit Metal Racing Team	(Czech Republic) Antonín Tlusťák	(Czech Republic) Jan Škaloud	1
Škoda	Škoda Fabia S2000	(Czech Republic) GPD Mit Metal Racing Team	(Czech Republic) Antonín Tlusťák	(Czech Republic) Lukáš Vyoral	2–10
Škoda	Škoda Fabia S2000	(Czech Republic) GPD Mit Metal Racing Team	(Czech Republic) Antonín Tlusťák	(Czech Republic) Ladislav Kučera	12
Škoda	Škoda Fabia S2000	(Czech Republic) GPD Mit Metal Racing Team	(Czech Republic) Jaroslav Orsák	(Czech Republic) Lukáš Kostka	12
Škoda	Škoda Fabia S2000	(Czech Republic) Czech National Team	(Czech Republic) Jan Černý	(Czech Republic) Pavel Kohout	1–2, 4
Škoda	Škoda Fabia S2000	(Czech Republic) AK Rallysport Brno	(Czech Republic) Jaromír Tarabus	(Czech Republic) Daniel Trunkát	1, 8
Škoda	Škoda Fabia S2000	Eurosol Racing Team Hungary	(Hungary) János Puskádi	(Hungary) Barnabás Gódor	2–4, 7, 10–11
Škoda	Škoda Fabia S2000	(Germany) Wallenwein Rallye Sport	(Germany) Mark Wallenwein	(Germany) Stefan Kopczyk	4
Škoda	Škoda Fabia S2000	(Belgium) Autostal Duindistel	(Belgium) Pieter Tsjoen	(Belgium) Bernd Casier	6, 10
Škoda	Škoda Fabia S2000	(Romania) Napoca Rally Academy	(Italy) Marco Tempestini	(Italy) Lucio Baggio	7
Škoda	Škoda Fabia S2000	(Romania) Škoda România Motorsport	(Romania) Dan Gîrtofan	(Romania) Adrian Berghea	7
Škoda	Škoda Fabia S2000	(Czech Republic) Adell Mogul Racing Team	(Czech Republic) Roman Kresta	(Czech Republic) Petr Gross	8
Škoda	Škoda Fabia S2000	(Slovakia) Rufa Sport	(Poland) Grzegorz Grzyb	(Poland) Daniel Siatkowski	9
Škoda	Škoda Fabia S2000	(Croatia) AKK Sveta Nedelja	(Croatia) Juraj Šebalj	(Croatia) Toni Klinc	10
Škoda	Škoda Fabia S2000	(Italy) S.A. Motorsport Italia	(Italy) Umberto Scandola	(Italy) Guido D'Amore	11
Peugeot	Peugeot 207 S2000	(Italy) Ateneo	(France) Bryan Bouffier	(France) Olivier Fournier	1
Peugeot	Peugeot 207 S2000	(Italy) Ateneo	(France) Bryan Bouffier	(France) Xavier Panseri	5, 7–9, 11
Peugeot	Peugeot 207 S2000	(Italy) Ateneo	(France) Bryan Bouffier	(Belgium) Lara Vanneste	6
Peugeot	Peugeot 207 S2000	(Belgium) Kronos Racing	(France) François Delecour	(France) Dominique Savignoni	1–2, 5, 7
Peugeot	Peugeot 207 S2000	(Czech Republic) Delimax Team	(Czech Republic) Pavel Valoušek	(Czech Republic) Lukáš Kostka	1
Peugeot	Peugeot 207 S2000	(Poland) Synthos Cersanit Rally Team	(Poland) Michał Sołowow	(Poland) Maciek Baran	1
Peugeot	Peugeot 207 S2000	(Italy) Delta Rally	(Italy) Valter Gentilini	(Italy) Gianni Marchi	1
Peugeot	Peugeot 207 S2000	(Italy) Delta Rally	(Italy) Dino Serafino Tolfo	(Italy) Mauro Marchiori	1
Peugeot	Peugeot 207 S2000	(Italy) Delta Rally	(Portugal) Bruno Magalhães	(Portugal) Nuno Rodrigues da Silva	4
Peugeot	Peugeot 207 S2000	(Italy) Delta Rally	(France) Jean-Michel Raoux	(France) Francis Mazotti	4–5
Peugeot	Peugeot 207 S2000	(Italy) Delta Rally	(France) Jean-Michel Raoux	(France) Laurent Magat	10, 12
Peugeot	Peugeot 207 S2000	(Italy) Delta Rally	(France) Jean-Marc Manzagol	(France) Etienne Patrone	5
Peugeot	Peugeot 207 S2000	(France) Saintéloc Racing	(Republic of Ireland) Craig Breen	(Republic of Ireland) David Moynihan	2
Peugeot	Peugeot 207 S2000	(France) Saintéloc Racing	(Republic of Ireland) Craig Breen	(Republic of Ireland) Paul Nagle	3–6
Peugeot	Peugeot 207 S2000	(France) Saintéloc Racing	(Republic of Ireland) Craig Breen	(Belgium) Lara Vanneste	9, 11–12
Peugeot	Peugeot 207 S2000	(France) Saintéloc Racing	(France) Jean-Matthieu Leandri	(Belgium) Renaud Jamoul	3, 5, 11
Peugeot	Peugeot 207 S2000	(France) Saintéloc Racing	(France) Jean-Matthieu Leandri	(France) Fabrice Gordon	6
Peugeot	Peugeot 207 S2000	(France) Saintéloc Racing	(France) Jérémi Ancian	(France) Gilles De Turckheim	3–5, 9
Peugeot	Peugeot 207 S2000	(France) Saintéloc Racing	(France) Jérémi Ancian	(France) Olivier Vitrani	11–12
Peugeot	Peugeot 207 S2000	(Belgium) Autostal Duindistel	(Belgium) Melisa Debackere	(Belgium) Cindy Cokelaere	6
Peugeot	Peugeot 207 S2000	(Belgium) Autostal Duindistel	(Belgium) Davy Vanneste	(Belgium) Denis Squedin	6
Peugeot	Peugeot 207 S2000	(Hungary) Tagai Racing Technology	(Poland) Maciek Rzeznik	(Poland) Przemysław Mazur	9
Peugeot	Peugeot 207 S2000	(Poland) QHR Team	(Poland) Tomasz Kuchar	(Poland) Daniel Dymurski	9
Peugeot	Peugeot 207 S2000	(Italy) Movisport	(Italy) Giandomenico Basso	(Italy) Mitia Dotta	11
Peugeot	Peugeot 207 S2000	(Italy) F.P.F. Sport	(Italy) Paolo Andreucci	(Italy) Anna Andreussi	11
Peugeot	Peugeot 207 S2000	(Italy) United Rally Management	(Italy) Alessandro Perico	(Italy) Fabrizio Carrara	11
Peugeot	Peugeot 207 S2000	(Italy) Racing Lions	(Italy) Stefano Albertini	(Italy) Simone Scattolin	11
Peugeot	Peugeot 207 S2000	(Switzerland) Lugano Racing Team	(Switzerland) Nicolas Althaus	(Switzerland) Alain Ioset	12
Peugeot	Peugeot 207 S2000	(Switzerland) Lugano Racing Team	(Switzerland) Sébastien Carron	(Switzerland) Lucien Revaz	12
Peugeot	Peugeot 207 S2000	(Switzerland) Lugano Racing Team	(Switzerland) Pascal Perroud	(Switzerland) Quentin Marchand	12
Peugeot	Peugeot 207 S2000	(Switzerland) Scuderia Zero4 Piu	(Switzerland) Gregoire Hotz	(Switzerland) Pietro Ravasi	12
Peugeot	Peugeot 208 R2	(Czech Republic) Peugeot Černý Racing	(Czech Republic) Jan Černý	(Czech Republic) Pavel Kohout	8
Mitsubishi	Mitsubishi Lancer Evo IX R4	(Austria) DiTech Racing Team	(Austria) Beppo Harrach	(Austria) Leopold Welsersheimb	1
Mitsubishi	Mitsubishi Lancer Evo IX R4	(Latvia) Sports Racing Technologies	(Russia) Vasiliy Gryazin	(Russia) Dmitry Chumak	2
Mitsubishi	Mitsubishi Lancer Evo IX R4	(Czech Republic) GPD Mit Metal Racing Team	(Czech Republic) Jaroslav Orsák	(Czech Republic) David Šmeidler	4–5
Mitsubishi	Mitsubishi Lancer Evo IX R4	(Czech Republic) GPD Mit Metal Racing Team	(Czech Republic) Jaroslav Orsák	(Czech Republic) Karel Vajík	6
Mitsubishi	Mitsubishi Lancer Evo IX R4	(Czech Republic) GPD Mit Metal Racing Team	(Czech Republic) Jaroslav Orsák	(Czech Republic) Lukáš Kostka	7–9
Mitsubishi	Mitsubishi Lancer Evo IX R4	(Czech Republic) GPD Mit Metal Racing Team	(Czech Republic) Robert Kořístka	(Czech Republic) Lukáš Kostka	10
Mitsubishi	Mitsubishi Lancer Evo IX R4	(Romania) Napoca Rally Academy	(Romania) Bogdan Marişca	(Romania) Sebastian Itu	5
Mitsubishi	Mitsubishi Lancer Evo IX R4	(Hungary) Botka Rally Team Kft.	(Hungary) Dávid Botka	(Hungary) Péter Mihalik	7
Mitsubishi	Mitsubishi Lancer Evo IX	(Czech Republic) GPD Mit Metal Racing Team	(Czech Republic) Jaroslav Orsák	(Czech Republic) David Šmeidler	1–2
Mitsubishi	Mitsubishi Lancer Evo IX	(Czech Republic) GPD Mit Metal Racing Team	(Czech Republic) Robert Kořístka	(Czech Republic) Michal Drozd	8
Mitsubishi	Mitsubishi Lancer Evo IX	(Germany) Gassner Motorsport	(Sweden) Stig Blomqvist	(Sweden) Robert Jakobsson	1
Mitsubishi	Mitsubishi Lancer Evo IX	(Romania) Napoca Rally Academy	(Italy) Andrea Smiderle	(Italy) Gianni Marchi	7
Mitsubishi	Mitsubishi Lancer Evo IX	(Romania) Napoca Rally Academy	(Romania) Bogdan Marişca	(Romania) Sebastian Itu	7, 10
Mitsubishi	Mitsubishi Lancer Evo IX	(Romania) Napoca Rally Academy	(Romania) Horaţiu Savu	(Romania) Alexandru Giuşcă	7
Mitsubishi	Mitsubishi Lancer Evo X	(Latvia) Autostils Rally Technica	(Russia) Alexey Lukyanuk	(Russia) Alexey Arnautov	2
Mitsubishi	Mitsubishi Lancer Evo X	(Latvia) Autostils Rally Technica	(Lithuania) Rokas Kvaraciejus	(Lithuania) Mindaugas Čepulis	2
Mitsubishi	Mitsubishi Lancer Evo X	(Romania) Vallino Rally Team	(Romania) Edwin Keleti	(Romania) Botond Csomortani	4, 7
Mitsubishi	Mitsubishi Lancer Evo X	(Lithuania) The Boar — Proracing	(Ukraine) Vitaliy Pushkar	(Ukraine) Ivan Mishyn	6
Mitsubishi	Mitsubishi Lancer Evo X R4	(Latvia) Autostils Rally Technica	(Estonia) Siim Plangi	(Estonia) Marek Sarapuu	2
Mitsubishi	Mitsubishi Lancer Evo X R4	(United Kingdom) Prodrive	(Hungary) Gergely Szabo	(Romania) Karoly Borbely	2, 7
Mitsubishi	Mitsubishi Lancer Evo X R4	(Lithuania) The Boar — Proracing	(Ukraine) Vitaliy Pushkar	(Ukraine) Ivan Mishyn	2, 4, 7
Mitsubishi	Mitsubishi Lancer Evo X R4	(Belgium) Autostal Atlantic	(Belgium) Andy Lefevere	(Belgium) Andy Vangheluwe	6
Mitsubishi	Mitsubishi Lancer Evo X R4	(Romania) Vallino Rally Team	(Romania) Valentin Porcișteanu	(Romania) Dan Dobre	7
Mitsubishi	Mitsubishi Lancer Evo X R4	(Lithuania) Ataka Racing	(Lithuania) Dominykas Butvilas	(Lithuania) Renatas Vaitkevičius	9
Mitsubishi	Mitsubishi Lancer Evo X R4	(Germany) Kathrein Renn und Rallye Team	(Germany) Hermann Gassner	(Austria) Ursula Mayrhofer	10
Mini	Mini John Cooper Works S2000	(Czech Republic) EuroOil Invelt Team	(Czech Republic) Václav Pech	(Czech Republic) Petr Uhel	1, 8
Mini	Mini John Cooper Works S2000	(Norway) Adapta Motorsport	(Latvia) Raimonds Kisiels	(Latvia) Arnis Ronis	2
Mini	Mini John Cooper Works S2000	(Spain) Canarias Sport Club	(Spain) Luis Monzón	(Spain) Jose Carlos Deniz	3
Mini	Mini John Cooper Works S2000	(Belgium) First Motorsport	(France) Stéphane Sarrazin	(France) Jacques-Julien Renucci	5
Subaru	Subaru Impreza R4	(Poland) Lotos Rally Team	(Poland) Kajetan Kajetanowicz	(Poland) Jarosław Baran	1
Subaru	Subaru Impreza R4	(Hungary) Turán Motorsport SE	(Hungary) Frigyes Turán	(Hungary) Gábor Zsíros	1–2
Subaru	Subaru Impreza R4	(Romania) Napoca Rally Academy	(Italy) Marco Tempestini	(Romania) Dorin Pulpea	2, 4–5, 9
Subaru	Subaru Impreza R4	(Romania) Napoca Rally Academy	(Italy) Marco Tempestini	(Italy) Lucio Baggio	6, 8, 10
Subaru	Subaru Impreza R4	(Romania) Napoca Rally Academy	(Italy) Simone Tempestini	(Romania) Sergiu Itu	2, 4
Subaru	Subaru Impreza R4	(Romania) Napoca Rally Academy	(Italy) Simone Tempestini	(Romania) Dorin Pulpea	7, 10
Subaru	Subaru Impreza R4	(Romania) Napoca Rally Academy	(Italy) Andrea Smiderle	(Italy) Mauro Marchiori	7
Subaru	Subaru Impreza R4	(Austria) Stohl Racing	(Austria) Andreas Aigner	(Austria) Jürgen Heigl	3, 5–6
Subaru	Subaru Impreza R4	(Austria) Stohl Racing	(Austria) Andreas Aigner	(Austria) Barbara Watzl	10–12
Subaru	Subaru Impreza R4	(Austria) Stohl Racing	(Hungary) László Vizin	(Hungary) Gábor Zsíros	3, 5, 10, 12
Subaru	Subaru Impreza R4	(Austria) Stohl Racing	(Japan) Toshihiro Arai	(Australia) Anthony McLoughlin	7–9, 11
Subaru	Subaru Impreza R4	(Poland) Platinum Subaru Rally Team	(Poland) Wojciech Chuchała	(Poland) Kamil Heller	9
Subaru	Subaru Impreza R4	(Poland) Platinum Subaru Rally Team	(Poland) Michał Bebenek	(Poland) Grzegorz Bebenek	9
Subaru	Subaru Impreza R4	(Switzerland) Lugano Racing Team	(Switzerland) Florian Gonon	(Luxembourg) Michel Horgnies	12
Subaru	Subaru Impreza WRX STI	(Romania) Napoca Rally Academy	(Italy) Alessandro Bruschetta	(Italy) Justin Bardini	4
Subaru	Subaru Impreza WRX STI	(Romania) Napoca Rally Academy	(Romania) Adrian Drăgan	(Romania) Valentin Brădăţeanu	7
Subaru	Subaru Impreza WRX STI	(Romania) Napoca Rally Academy	(Italy) Simone Tempestini	(Romania) Dorin Pulpea	8
Ford	Ford Fiesta RRC	(United Kingdom) Autotek Motorsport	(Finland) Jari Ketomaa	(Finland) Kaj Lindström	2
Ford	Ford Fiesta RRC	(Austria) Stohl Racing	(Brazil) Daniel Oliveira	(Portugal) António Costa	3
Ford	Ford Fiesta RRC	(Austria) Stohl Racing	(Brazil) Daniel Oliveira	(Portugal) Carlos Magalhães	5
Ford	Ford Fiesta RRC	(Ukraine) AT Rally Team	(Portugal) Bernardo Sousa	(Portugal) Hugo Magalhães	4
Ford	Ford Fiesta RRC	(France) Team Emap Yacco	(France) Julien Maurin	(France) Nicolas Klinger	5
Ford	Ford Fiesta RRC	(Italy) Fuckmatié World Rally Team	(Italy) Lorenzo Bertelli	(Italy) Mitia Dotta	5
Ford	Ford Fiesta RRC	(Poland) Synthos Cersanit Rally Team	(Poland) Michał Sołowow	(Poland) Sebastian Rozwadowski	6, 9
Ford	Ford Fiesta RRC	(Poland) Lotto Team	(Poland) Krzysztof Hołowczyc	(Poland) Lukasz Kurzeja	9
Ford	Ford Fiesta RRC	(Croatia) AK Delta Timing	(Croatia) Daniel Šaškin	(Croatia) Damir Bruner	10
Ford	Ford Fiesta RRC	(Switzerland) Scuderia Zero4 Piu	(Switzerland) Olivier Burri	(Switzerland) André Saucy	12
Ford	Ford Fiesta S2000	(Belgium) Symtech Racing	(New Zealand) Hayden Paddon	(New Zealand) John Kennard	6
Ford	Ford Fiesta S2000	(Ukraine) AT Rally Team	(Finland) Mikko Pajunen	(Finland) Janne Perälä	6
Ford	Ford Fiesta S2000	(Netherlands) Kobus Tuning	(Netherlands) Hermen Kobus	(Netherlands) Erik de Wild	6
Ford	Ford Fiesta S2000	(Finland) Printsport Racing	(Turkey) Yagiz Avci	(Turkey) Bahadir Gucenmez	9
Ford	Ford Fiesta S2000	(Poland) Inter Cars Castrol TRW	(Poland) Maciek Oleksowicz	(Poland) Michał Kusnierz	9
Ford	Ford Fiesta S2000	(Latvia) Sport Racing Technologies	(Russia) Vasily Gryazin	(Russia) Dimitry Chumak	9, 11–12
Ford	Ford Fiesta R5	(Slovakia) Rufa Sport	(Czech Republic) Tomáš Kostka	(Czech Republic) Miroslav Houšť	8
Ford	Ford Fiesta R5	(Czech Republic) Delimax Team	(Czech Republic) Pavel Valoušek	(Czech Republic) Martina Škardová	8
Ford	Ford Fiesta R5	(Poland) Lotos Rally Team	(Poland) Kajetan Kajetanowicz	(Poland) Jarosław Baran	9
Ford	Ford Fiesta R5	(Poland) Lotos Rally Team	(Poland) Michał Kościuszko	(Poland) Maciek Szczepaniak	9
Ford	Ford Fiesta R5	(Estonia) MM Motorsport	(Estonia) Martin Kangur	(Estonia) Andres Ots	9
Ford	Ford Fiesta R5	(Bulgaria) Globul Rally Team	(Bulgaria) Krum Donchev	(Bulgaria) Petar Yordanov	10
Citroën	Citroën DS3 RRC	(France) PH Sport	(Poland) Robert Kubica	(Poland) Maciek Baran	3–5, 9
Renault	Renault Mégane RS	(France) Renault Sport Technologies	(France) Robert Consani	(France) Thibault Gorczyca	3, 5–6, 8
Renault	Renault Mégane RS	(France) Renault Sport Technologies	(France) Robert Consani	(France) Nicolas Klinger	10–11
Renault	Renault Mégane RS	(France) Renault Sport Technologies	(France) Robert Consani	(France) Vincent Landais	12
Renault	Renault Mégane RS	(France) Renault Sport Technologies	(France) Germain Bonnefis	(France) Olivier Fournier	3, 5–6, 8, 10–11
Renault	Renault Mégane RS	(France) Renault Sport Technologies	(France) Alain Pyrame	(France) Florent Lacroux	11
Renault	Renault Mégane RS	(France) Renault Sport Technologies	(France) Romain Salinas	(France) Benjamin Micheli	12

=== Ladies Trophy ===
Constructor	Car	Entrant	Driver	Co-driver	Rounds
Peugeot	Peugeot 207 S2000	(Belgium) Autostal Duindistel	(Belgium) Melissa Debackere	(Belgium) Cindy Cokelaere	6
Mitsubishi	Mitsubishi Lancer Evo IX	(Slovenia) Autosport Jazon	(Slovenia) Asja Zupanc	(Slovenia) Blanca Kacin	10
Ford	Ford Fiesta R2	(Spain) Copi Sport	(Spain) Emma Falcón	(Spain) Rogelio Peñate	3
Ford	Ford Fiesta R1	(Belgium) Autostal Atlantic	(Belgium) Evelien de Corte	(Netherlands) Annemieke Hulzebos	6
Citroën	Citroën C2 R2	(Romania) Napoca Rally Academy	(Bulgaria) Ekaterina Stratieva	(Italy) Veronica Boni	3–7
Citroën	Citroën C2 R2	(Romania) Napoca Rally Academy	(Bulgaria) Ekaterina Stratieva	(Romania) Carmen Poenaru	9–10, 12
Citroën	Citroën C2 R2	(Czech Republic) GPD Mit Metal Racing Team	(Bulgaria) Ekaterina Stratieva	(Romania) Carmen Poenaru	8
Citroën	Citroën DS3 R3T	(Italy) United Rally Management	(Australia) Molly Taylor	(United Kingdom) Sebastian Marshall	4–10
Citroën	Citroën DS3 R1	(Belgium) East Belgian Racing Team	(Belgium) Julie Devalet	(Luxembourg) Jennifer Thielen	6
Renault	Renault Clio Sport	(Czech Republic) ČK Motorsport	(Czech Republic) Martina Dañhelová	(Czech Republic) Karolína Jugasová	8
Volkswagen	Volkswagen Polo	(Slovenia) MM Power	(Slovenia) Yovana Jovanović	(Bosnia and Herzegovina) Nataš Tunguz	10

== Results ==
Round	Rally name	Podium finishers			
Round	Rally name	Rank	Driver	Car	Time
1	(Austria) Internationale Jänner Rallye (3–5 January) — Results and report	1	(Czech Republic) Jan Kopecký	Škoda Fabia S2000	2:35:45.3
1	(Austria) Internationale Jänner Rallye (3–5 January) — Results and report	2	(France) Bryan Bouffier	Peugeot 207 S2000	2:35:45.8
1	(Austria) Internationale Jänner Rallye (3–5 January) — Results and report	3	(Austria) Raimund Baumschlager	Škoda Fabia S2000	2:37:03.4
2	(Latvia) Rally Liepāja-Ventspils (1–3 February) — Results and report	1	(Finland) Jari Ketomaa	Ford Fiesta RRC	2:08:15.7
2	(Latvia) Rally Liepāja-Ventspils (1–3 February) — Results and report	2	(Republic of Ireland) Craig Breen	Peugeot 207 S2000	2:08:46.7
2	(Latvia) Rally Liepāja-Ventspils (1–3 February) — Results and report	3	(France) François Delecour	Peugeot 207 S2000	2:11:03.2
3	(Spain) Rally Islas Canarias El Corte Inglés (21–23 March) — Results and report	1	(Czech Republic) Jan Kopecký	Škoda Fabia S2000	2:24:30.9
3	(Spain) Rally Islas Canarias El Corte Inglés (21–23 March) — Results and report	2	(Republic of Ireland) Craig Breen	Peugeot 207 S2000	2:26:23.3
3	(Spain) Rally Islas Canarias El Corte Inglés (21–23 March) — Results and report	3	(Spain) Luis Monzón	Mini John Cooper Works S2000	2:27:49.8
4	(Portugal) Rallye Açores (25–27 April) — Results and report	1	(Czech Republic) Jan Kopecký	Škoda Fabia S2000	2:26:32.2
4	(Portugal) Rallye Açores (25–27 April) — Results and report	2	(Republic of Ireland) Craig Breen	Peugeot 207 S2000	2:27:04.4
4	(Portugal) Rallye Açores (25–27 April) — Results and report	3	(Portugal) Ricardo Moura	Škoda Fabia S2000	2:27:31.0
5	(France) Tour de Corse (16–18 May) — Results and report	1	(France) Bryan Bouffier	Peugeot 207 S2000	2:41:58.2
5	(France) Tour de Corse (16–18 May) — Results and report	2	(Czech Republic) Jan Kopecký	Škoda Fabia S2000	2:42:38.0
5	(France) Tour de Corse (16–18 May) — Results and report	3	(France) Stéphane Sarrazin	Mini John Cooper Works S2000	2:43:35.8
6	(Belgium) Ypres Rally (27–29 June) — Results and report	1	(Belgium) Freddy Loix	Škoda Fabia S2000	2:32:19.4
6	(Belgium) Ypres Rally (27–29 June) — Results and report	2	(France) Bryan Bouffier	Peugeot 207 S2000	2:33:40.4
6	(Belgium) Ypres Rally (27–29 June) — Results and report	3	(Republic of Ireland) Craig Breen	Peugeot 207 S2000	2:34:11.9
7	Sibiu Rally Romania (25–27 July) — Results and report	1	(Czech Republic) Jan Kopecký	Škoda Fabia S2000	2:18:07.8
7	Sibiu Rally Romania (25–27 July) — Results and report	2	(France) François Delecour	Peugeot 207 S2000	2:21:10.6
7	Sibiu Rally Romania (25–27 July) — Results and report	3	(Japan) Toshihiro Arai	Subaru Impreza R4	2:24:11.4
8	(Czech Republic) Barum Czech Rally Zlín (30 August – 1 September) — Results and report	1	(Czech Republic) Jan Kopecký	Škoda Fabia S2000	2:15:23.0
8	(Czech Republic) Barum Czech Rally Zlín (30 August – 1 September) — Results and report	2	(Czech Republic) Václav Pech jr	Mini John Cooper Works S2000	2:16:24.6
8	(Czech Republic) Barum Czech Rally Zlín (30 August – 1 September) — Results and report	3	(Czech Republic) Jaromír Tarabus	Škoda Fabia S2000	2:17:55.7
9	Rally Poland (13–15 September) — Results and report	1	(Poland) Kajetan Kajetanowicz	Ford Fiesta R5	1:58:40.6
9	Rally Poland (13–15 September) — Results and report	2	(France) Bryan Bouffier	Peugeot 207 S2000	1:59:03.9
9	Rally Poland (13–15 September) — Results and report	3	(Czech Republic) Jan Kopecký	Škoda Fabia S2000	2:00:09.0
10	Croatia Rally (26—28 September) — Results and report	1	(Czech Republic) Jan Kopecký	Škoda Fabia S2000	2:23:11.0
10	Croatia Rally (26—28 September) — Results and report	2	(Austria) Andreas Aigner	Subaru Impreza R4	2:25:06.6
10	Croatia Rally (26—28 September) — Results and report	3	(Germany) Hermann Gassner	Mitsubishi Lancer Evo X R4	2:25:20.8
11	(Italy) Rallye Sanremo (10–12 October) — Results and report	1	(Italy) Giandomenico Basso	Peugeot 207 S2000	2:37:37.3
11	(Italy) Rallye Sanremo (10–12 October) — Results and report	2	(Finland) Esapekka Lappi	Škoda Fabia S2000	2:39:20.3
11	(Italy) Rallye Sanremo (10–12 October) — Results and report	3	(Italy) Alessandro Perico	Peugeot 207 S2000	2:39:24.4
12	(Switzerland) Rallye International du Valais (7–9 November) — Results and report	1	(Finland) Esapekka Lappi	Škoda Fabia S2000	3:13:42.8
12	(Switzerland) Rallye International du Valais (7–9 November) — Results and report	2	(Switzerland) Olivier Burri	Ford Fiesta RRC	3:17:11.0
12	(Switzerland) Rallye International du Valais (7–9 November) — Results and report	3	(Republic of Ireland) Craig Breen	Peugeot 207 S2000	3:17:19.0

== Championship standings ==
=== Drivers' Championship ===
- For the drivers' championship, only the best four results from the first six rallies and the best four results from the remaining six rallies could be retained by each driver. Points are awarded on a 25–18–15–12–10–8–6–4–2–1 scale, with bonus points awarded on a 7–6–5–4–3–2–1 scale, to the top seven drivers on each leg of a rally, provided the leg covers at least 25% of the total rally length.

Pos	Driver	JÄN (Austria)	LIE (Latvia)	CAN (Spain)	AZO (Portugal)	COR (France)	YPR (Belgium)	ROM (Romania)	ZLÍ (Czech Republic)	POL (Poland)	CRO (Croatia)	SAN (Italy)	VAL (Switzerland)	Points
1	(Czech Republic) Jan Kopecký	1^{13}		1^{13}	1^{14}	2^{13}		1^{14}	1^{13}	3^{10}	1^{14}			287
2	(France) Bryan Bouffier	2^{13}			DNS	1^{13}	2^{12}	Ret	DNS	2^{12}		4^{8}		149
3	(Republic of Ireland) Craig Breen		2^{12}	2^{10}	2^{12}	4^{9}	3^{11}			7^{1}		Ret^{2}	3^{7}	145
4	(France) François Delecour	7^{3}	3^{8}			5^{6}	DNS	2^{9}						75
5	(Finland) Esapekka Lappi								Ret			2^{8}	1^{13}	64
6	(Austria) Andreas Aigner			4^{6}		7^{1}	11^{3}				2^{11}	11	Ret^{6}	57
7	(Poland) Kajetan Kajetanowicz	6^{4}								1^{13}				50
8	(Czech Republic) Václav Pech	4^{8}							2^{11}					49
9	(Finland) Jari Ketomaa		1^{14}											39
10	(Italy) Giandomenico Basso											1^{13}		38
11	(Belgium) Freddy Loix						1^{12}							37
12	(France) Jérémi Ancian			Ret^{4}	5^{6}	Ret				22		Ret	4^{5}	37
13	(Czech Republic) Jaroslav Orsák	8	9		Ret	12	Ret	7^{2}	7^{2}	DNS			5^{5}	37
14	(Switzerland) Olivier Burri												2^{10}	28
15	(Czech Republic) Jaromír Tarabus	9							3^{8}					25
16	(Poland) Michał Sołowow	Ret					6^{4}			6^{5}				25
17	(Spain) Luis Monzón			3^{9}										24
18	(Portugal) Ricardo Moura				3^{9}									24
19	(France) Stéphane Sarrazin					3^{9}								24
20	(Germany) Hermann Gassner Jr.										3^{9}			24
21	(Japan) Toshihiro Arai							3^{8}	Ret	13		19		23
22	(Austria) Raimund Baumschlager	3^{8}												23
23	(Italy) Alessandro Perico											3^{8}		23
24	(Belgium) Pieter Tsjoen						DNS				4^{10}			22
25	(Czech Republic) Jan Černý	Ret	4^{8}		Ret				12					20
26	(Portugal) Bruno Magalhães				4^{8}									20
27	(Germany) Sepp Wiegand								4^{6}					18
28	(Poland) Michał Kościuszko									4^{6}				18
29	(Poland) Robert Kubica			Ret^{7}	6^{2}	Ret				Ret				17
30	(Romania) Marco Tempestini		20		10	16	32	4^{3}	27		15			16
31	(France) Germain Bonnefis			5^{3}		9	12		11^{1}		Ret	WD		16
32	(Austria) Beppo Harrach	5^{6}												16
33	(Belgium) Andy Lefevere						4^{3}							15
34	(Hungary) David Botka							5^{5}						15
35	(Czech Republic) Roman Kresta								5^{5}					15
36	(Poland) Krzysztof Hołowczyc									5^{5}				15
37	(South Africa) Henk Lategan										5^{5}			15
38	(Italy) Paolo Andreucci											6^{7}		15
39	(Italy) Stefano Albertini											5^{4}		14
40	(Hungary) Andras Hadik						8		Ret		6^{2}			14
41	(Romania) Valentin Porcișteanu							6^{6}						14
42	(Netherlands) Hermen Kobus						5^{3}							13
43	(Hungary) János Puskádi		22	7^{3}	11			8			14	18		13
44	(Czech Republic) Pavel Valoušek	10^{1}							8^{7}					12
45	(Latvia) Vasiliy Gryazin		13^{3}			15				9^{3}		10	Ret^{4}	8
46	(Latvia) Raimonds Kisiels		5^{2}											12
47	(France) Julien Maurin					6^{4}								12
48	(Switzerland) Nicolas Althaus											6^{4}		12
49	(Lithuania) Vytautas Švedas		6^{3}							Ret				11
50	(Czech Republic) Miroslav Jakes								6^{3}					11
51	(Spain) Gorka Antxustegi			6^{1}										9
52	(Czech Republic) Antonin Tlusták	Ret	17	10	9	11	9	9	9	DNS	Ret		Ret	9
53	(Slovenia) Aleks Humar										7^{2}			8
54	(Switzerland) Florian Gonon												7^{2}	8
55	(France) Jean-Mathieu Leandri			8	Ret	8	Ret			Ret		Ret		8
56	(Belgium) Melissa Debackere						7^{1}							7
57	(Latvia) Aivis Egle		7											6
58	(Italy) Alessandro Bruschetta				7									6
59	(Italy) Federico Gasperetti											7		6
60	(Poland) Zbigniew Staniszewski									8^{1}				5
61	(Romania) Edwin Keleti				Ret			Ret^{5}						5
62	(New Zealand) Hayden Paddon						Ret^{5}							5
63	(Russia) Alexey Lukyanuk		Ret^{5}											5
64	(Italy) Umberto Scandola											Ret^{5}		5
65	(Estonia) Raul Jeets		8											4
66	(Portugal) Luis Rego				8									4
67	(Croatia) Daniel Saskin										8			4
68	(Italy) Alex Vittalini											8		4
69	(Switzerland) Pascal Perroud												8	4
70	(Romania) Dan Gârtofan							Ret^{4}						4
71	(Portugal) Bernardo Sousa				Ret^{3}									3
72	(Croatia) Juraj Sebalj										Ret^{3}			3
73	(France) Robert Consani			9		Ret	Ret		Ret		12	Ret	Ret	2
74	(Slovenia) Jani Trcek										9			2
75	(Italy) Michele Tassone											9		2
76	(France) Sylvain Michel												9	2
77	(France) Jean Michel Raoux	Ret			Ret^{1}	10		Ret			DNS			2
78	(Belgium) Davy Vanneste						Ret^{2}							2
79	(Hungary) Zoltán Bessenyey										10			1
80	(Romania) Sebastian Barbu							10			Ret	25		1
81	(Ukraine) Vitaliy Pushkar		10					Ret						1
82	(Belgium) David Croes						10							1
83	(Czech Republic) Robert Koristka								10		Ret			1
84	(Poland) Maciej Oleksowicz									10				1
85	(France) Romain Salinas												10	1
86	(Germany) Mark Wallenwein				13^{1}									1
87	(Italy) Andrea Nucita											15^{1}		1
88	(France) Jean-Marc Manzagol					Ret^{1}								1
89	(Estonia) Siim Plangi		Ret^{1}											1
Pos	Driver	JÄN (Austria)	LIE (Latvia)	CAN (Spain)	AZO (Portugal)	COR (France)	YPR (Belgium)	ROM (Romania)	ZLÍ (Czech Republic)	POL (Poland)	CRO (Croatia)	SAN (Italy)	VAL (Switzerland)	Points

Key
Colour	Result
Gold	Winner
Silver	2nd place
Bronze	3rd place
Green	Points finish
Blue	Non-points finish
Blue	Non-classified finish (NC)
Purple	Did not finish (Ret)
Black	Excluded (EX)
Black	Disqualified (DSQ)
White	Did not start (DNS)
White	Cancelled (C)
Blank	Withdrew entry from the event (WD)
