= 2013 Barum Czech Rally Zlín =

Barum Czech Rally Zlín 2013
Round 8 of the 2013 European Rally Championship season
← Previous event	Next event →
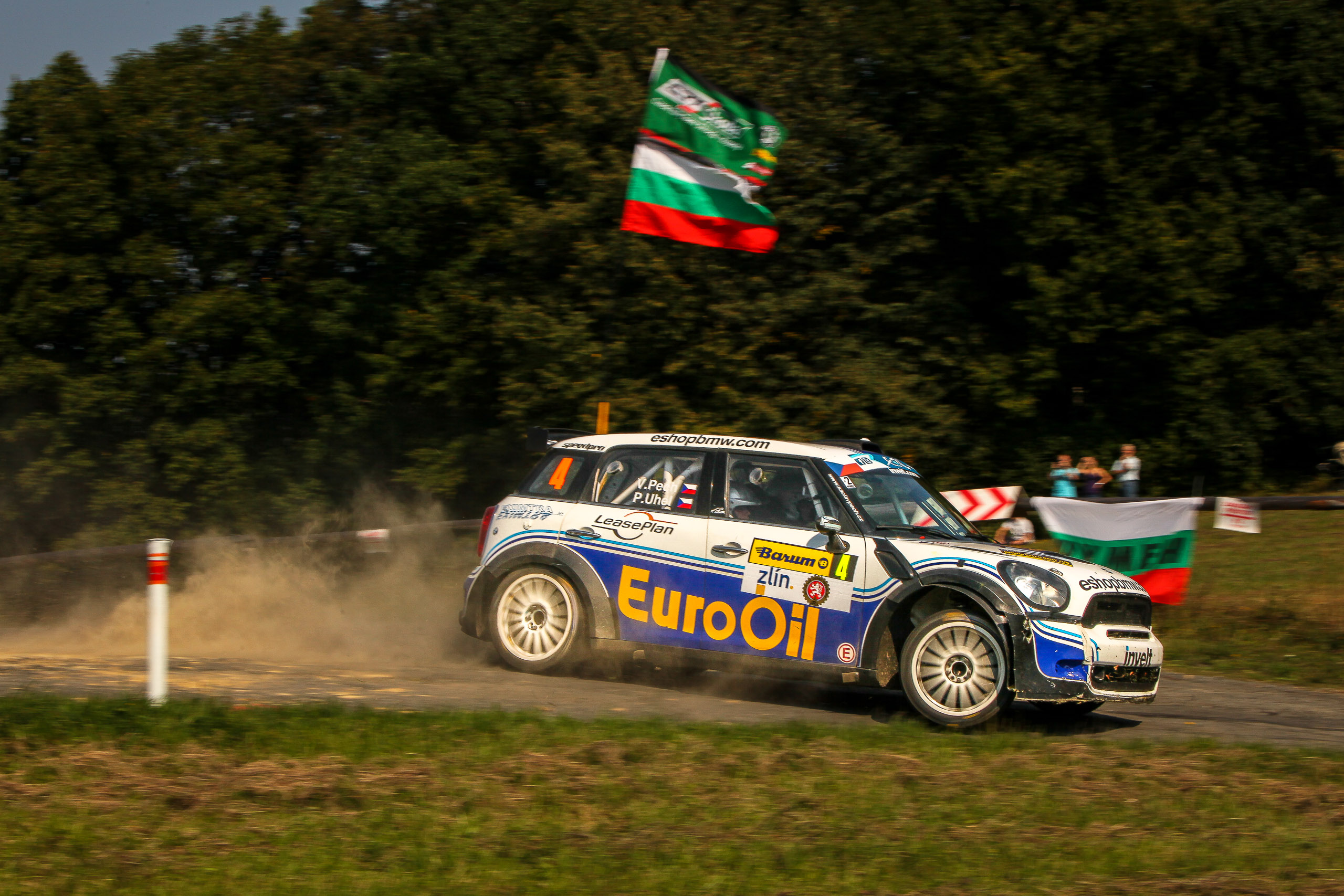
- Host country: Czech Republic
- Rally base: Zlín
- Dates run: 30 August – 1 September 2013
- Stages: 15 (235 km; 146 miles)
- Stage surface: Tarmac

Statistics
- Crews: 11 (ERC only) at start, 7 (ERC only) at finish

The 2013 Barum Czech Rally Zlín, formally the 43. Barum Czech Rally Zlín, was the eighth round of the 2013 European Rally Championship season.

== Results ==
Pos.	Driver	Co-driver	Car	Time	Difference	Points
1	(Czech Republic) Jan Kopecký	(Czech Republic) Pavel Dresler	(Czech Republic) Škoda Fabia S2000	2:15:23.0	–	25+13
2	(Czech Republic) Václav Pech	(Czech Republic) Petř Uhel	(United Kingdom) Mini Cooper S2000 1.6T	2:16:24.6	+1:01.6	18+11
3	(Czech Republic) Jaromír Tarabus	(Czech Republic) Daniel Trunkát	(Czech Republic) Škoda Fabia S2000	2:17:55.7	+2:32.7	15+8
4	(Germany) Sepp Wiegand	(Germany) Frank Christian	(Czech Republic) Škoda Fabia S2000	2:18:27.3	+3:04.3	12+6
5	(Czech Republic) Roman Kresta	(Czech Republic) Petr Gross	(Czech Republic) Škoda Fabia S2000	2:19:21.7	+3:58.7	10+5
6	(Czech Republic) Miroslav Jakeš	(Czech Republic) Igor Norek	(Japan) Mitsubishi Lancer Evo IX	2:21:58.8	+6:35.8	8+3
7	(Czech Republic) Jaroslav Orsák	(Czech Republic) Lukáš Kostka	(Japan) Mitsubishi Lancer Evo IX R4	2:23:15.1	+7:52.1	6+2
8	(Czech Republic) Pavel Valoušek	(Czech Republic) Martina Škardová	(United Kingdom) Ford Fiesta R5	2:23:15.6	+7:52.6	4+7
9	(Czech Republic) Antonín Tlusťák	(Czech Republic) Lukáš Vyoral	(Czech Republic) Škoda Fabia S2000	2:23:50.4	+8:27.4	2
10	(Czech Republic) Robert Kořístka	(Czech Republic) Michal Drozd	(Japan) Mitsubishi Lancer Evo IX	2:25:00.2	+9:37.2	1

=== Special stages ===
Day	Stage	Name	Length	Time	Winner	Time	Avg. spd.	Rally leader
Day 1 30 August	SS1	SSS Zlín	9.36 km	21:15	(Czech Republic) Jan Kopecký	7:07.6	79.0 km/h	(Czech Republic) Jan Kopecký
Day 2 31 August	SS2	Biskupice 1	8.81 km	9:23	(Czech Republic) Jan Kopecký	4:54.5	107.7 km/h	(Czech Republic) Jan Kopecký
Day 2 31 August	SS3	Troják 1	22.03 km	10:16	(Czech Republic) Jan Kopecký	12:12.7	108.2 km/h	(Czech Republic) Jan Kopecký
Day 2 31 August	SS4	Semetín 1	11.51 km	10:59	(Czech Republic) Jan Kopecký	6:36.4	104.5 km/h	(Czech Republic) Jan Kopecký
Day 2 31 August	SS5	Pindula 1	18.43 km	14:12	(Czech Republic) Jan Kopecký	9:44.8	113.5 km/h	(Czech Republic) Jan Kopecký
Day 2 31 August	SS6	Troják 2	22.03 km	15:05	(Czech Republic) Jan Kopecký	12:02.8	109.7 km/h	(Czech Republic) Jan Kopecký
Day 2 31 August	SS7	Semetín 2	11.51 km	15:48	(Czech Republic) Jan Kopecký	6:33.6	105.3 km/h	(Czech Republic) Jan Kopecký
Day 2 31 August	SS8	Biskupice 2	8.81 km	19:01	(Czech Republic) Jan Kopecký	4:54.6	107.7 km/h	(Czech Republic) Jan Kopecký
Day 2 31 August	SS9	Pindula 2	18.43 km	19:44	(Czech Republic) Jan Kopecký	9:50.0	112.5 km/h	(Czech Republic) Jan Kopecký
Day 3 1 September	SS10	Maják 1	23.66 km	8:53	(Czech Republic) Roman Kresta	13:51.3	102.5 km/h	(Czech Republic) Jan Kopecký
Day 3 1 September	SS11	Jankovice 1	19.42 km	9:41	(Czech Republic) Pavel Valoušek	11:32.0	101.0 km/h	(Czech Republic) Jan Kopecký
Day 3 1 September	SS12	Žlutava 1	8.85 km	10:34	(Czech Republic) Roman Kresta	5:21.4	99.1 km/h	(Czech Republic) Jan Kopecký
Day 3 1 September	SS13	Maják 2	23.66 km	12:47	(Czech Republic) Roman Kresta	13:42.5	103.6 km/h	(Czech Republic) Jan Kopecký
Day 3 1 September	SS14	Jankovice 2	19.42 km	13:35	(Czech Republic) Roman Kresta	11:08.9	104.5 km/h	(Czech Republic) Jan Kopecký
Day 3 1 September	SS15	Žlutava 2	8.85 km	14:28	(Czech Republic) Pavel Valoušek	5:16.7	100.6 km/h	(Czech Republic) Jan Kopecký
