= 2013 Internationale Jänner Rallye =

30. Internationale Jänner Rallye 2013
Round 1 of the 2013 European Rally Championship season
Next event →
- Host country: (Austria)
- Rally base: Freistadt
- Dates run: 3 – 5 January 2013
- Stages: 18 (248.46 km; 154.39 miles)
- Stage surface: Tarmac

Statistics
- Crews: 88 at start

The 30. Internationale Jänner Rallye 2013 was the first round of the 2013 European Rally Championship. The eighteen stage asphalt, snow and ice rally took place over 3–5 January 2013. Jan Kopecký won the rally with an amazing recovery, after being in third place at almost 30 seconds from the lead, with just three stages until the end of the rally.

== Results ==
Pos.	Driver	Co-driver	Car	Time	Difference	Points
1	(Czech Republic) Jan Kopecký	(Czech Republic) Pavel Dresler	(Czech Republic) Škoda Fabia S2000	2:35:45.3		25+13
2	(France) Bryan Bouffier	(France) Olivier Fournier	(France) Peugeot 207 S2000	2:35:45.8	+0.5	18+13
3	(Austria) Raimund Baumschlager	(Germany) Klaus Wicha	(Czech Republic) Škoda Fabia S2000	2:37:03.4	+1:18.1	15+8
4	(Czech Republic) Václav Pech	(Czech Republic) Petř Uhel	(United Kingdom) Mini Cooper S2000 1.6T	2:38:32.3	+2:47.0	12+8
5	(Austria) Beppo Harrach	(Austria) Leop. Welsersheimb	(Japan) Mitsubishi Lancer Evo IX R4	2:39:17.1	+3:31.8	10+6
6	(Poland) Kajetan Kajetanowicz	(Poland) Jarosław Baran	(Japan) Subaru Impreza STi R4	2:39:18.2	+3:32.9	8+4
7	(France) François Delecour	(France) Dominique Savignoni	(France) Peugeot 207 S2000	2:41:06.5	+5:21.2	6+3
8	(Czech Republic) Jaroslav Orsák	(Czech Republic) David Šmeidler	(Japan) Mitsubishi Lancer Evo IX R4	2:42:19.0	+6:33.7	4
9	(Czech Republic) Jaromír Tarabus	(Czech Republic) Daniel Trunkát	(Czech Republic) Škoda Fabia S2000	2:43:41.3	+7:56.0	2
10	(Czech Republic) Pavel Valoušek	(Czech Republic) Lukáš Kostka	(France) Peugeot 207 S2000	2:43:57.1	+8:11.8	1+1

=== Special stages ===
Day	Stage	Time	Name	Length	Winner	Time	Avg. spd.	Rally leader
Leg 1 (4 January)	SS1	8:21	Pierbach 1	18.99 km	(Czech Republic) Jan Kopecký	13:08.7	86.7 km/h	(Czech Republic) Jan Kopecký
Leg 1 (4 January)	SS2	9:24	Liebenau 1	10.22 km	(Austria) Raimund Baumschlager	7:14.6	84.7 km/h	(Czech Republic) Jan Kopecký
Leg 1 (4 January)	SS3	10:10	St. Oswald 1	8.68 km	(Czech Republic) Jaroslav Orsák	5:57.1	87.5 km/h	(Czech Republic) Jan Kopecký
Leg 1 (4 January)	SS4	12:06	Pierbach 2	18.99 km	(France) Bryan Bouffier	13:18.5	85.6 km/h	(Czech Republic) Jan Kopecký
Leg 1 (4 January)	SS5	13:09	Liebenau 2	10.22 km	(Austria) Raimund Baumschlager	6:25.6	95.4 km/h	(Austria) Raimund Baumschlager
Leg 1 (4 January)	SS6	13:55	St. Oswald 2	8.68 km	(France) Bryan Bouffier	4:57.8	104.9 km/h	(Czech Republic) Jan Kopecký
Leg 1 (4 January)	SS7	15:52	Pregarten 1	8.80 km	(Czech Republic) Jan Kopecký	4:33.5	115.8 km/h	(Czech Republic) Jan Kopecký
Leg 1 (4 January)	SS8	15:52	Schönau – St. Leohnard 1	22.95 km	(France) Bryan Bouffier	14:21.3	95.9 km/h	(Czech Republic) Jan Kopecký
Leg 1 (4 January)	SS9	18:47	Pregarten 1	8.80 km	(Czech Republic) Václav Pech	4:52.0	108.5 km/h	(Czech Republic) Jan Kopecký
Leg 1 (4 January)	SS10	19:30	Schönau – St. Leohnard 1	22.95 km	(Czech Republic) Jan Kopecký	14:09.4	97.3 km/h	(Czech Republic) Jan Kopecký
Leg 2 (5 January)	SS11	7:38	Gutau 1	8.27 km	(Czech Republic) Jan Kopecký	4:38.5	109.6 km/h	(Czech Republic) Jan Kopecký
Leg 2 (5 January)	SS12	8:35	Unterweißenbach 1	13.53 km	(France) Bryan Bouffier	8:16.2	98.2 km/h	(Czech Republic) Jan Kopecký
Leg 2 (5 January)	SS13	9:10	Arena Königswiesen 1	7.79 km	(Austria) Raimund Baumschlager	5:09.8	90.5 km/h	(Czech Republic) Jan Kopecký
Leg 2 (5 January)	SS14	11:23	Gutau 2	8.27 km	(Czech Republic) Jan Kopecký	4:42.5	105.4 km/h	(Czech Republic) Jan Kopecký
Leg 2 (5 January)	SS15	12:20	Unterweißenbach 2	13.53 km	(Austria) Beppo Harrach	8:40.2	93.6 km/h	(France) Bryan Bouffier
Leg 2 (5 January)	SS16	12:55	Arena Königswiesen 2	7.79 km	(Poland) Kajetan Kajetanowicz	5:23.3	86.7 km/h	(France) Bryan Bouffier
Leg 2 (5 January)	SS17	13:49	Bad Zell – Tragwein – Aisttal 1	25.00 km	(Czech Republic) Jan Kopecký	13:27.2	111.5 km/h	(France) Bryan Bouffier
Leg 2 (5 January)	SS18	16:07	Bad Zell – Tragwein – Aisttal 2	25.00 km	(Czech Republic) Jan Kopecký	13:42.0	109.5 km/h	(Czech Republic) Jan Kopecký
