= 2013 Ypres Rally =

GEKO Ypres Rally 2013
Round 6 of the 2013 European Rally Championship season
← Previous event	Next event →
- Host country: Belgium
- Rally base: Ypres
- Dates run: 27 – 29 June 2013
- Stages: 20 (298 km; 185 miles)
- Stage surface: Asphalt

Statistics
- Crews: 7 (ERC only) at start, 4 (ERC only) at finish

The 2013 Belgium Ypres Westhoek Rally, formally the 49. GEKO Ypres Rally, was the sixth round of the 2013 European Rally Championship season.

== Results ==
Pos.	Driver	Co-driver	Car	Time	Difference	Points
1	(Belgium) Freddy Loix	(Belgium) Frédéric Miclotte	(Czech Republic) Škoda Fabia S2000	2:32:19.4	–	25+12
2	(France) Bryan Bouffier	(France) Xavier Panseri	(France) Peugeot 207 S2000	2:33:40.04	+1:21.0	18+12
3	(Republic of Ireland) Craig Breen	(Republic of Ireland) Paul Nagle	(France) Peugeot 207 S2000	2:34:11.9	+1:52.5	15+11
4	(Belgium) Andy Lefevere	(Belgium) Andy Vangheluwe	(Japan) Mitsubishi Lancer Evo X R4	2:38:55.8	+6:36.4	12+3
5	(Netherlands) Hermen Kobus	(France) Erik de Wild	(United Kingdom) Ford Fiesta S2000	2:39:00.6	+6:41.2	10+3
6	(Poland) Michał Sołowow	(Poland) Sebastian Rozwadowski	(United Kingdom) Ford Fiesta RRC	2:39:19.4	+7:00.0	8+4
7	(Belgium) Melisa Debackere	(Belgium) Cindy Cokelaere	(France) Peugeot 207 S2000	2:41:57.9	+9:38.5	6+1
8	(Hungary) András Hadik	(Hungary) Krisztián Kertész	(Japan) Subaru Impreza R4	2:42:28.7	+10:09.3	4
9	(Czech Republic) Antonín Tlusťák	(Czech Republic) Jan Škaloud	(Czech Republic) Škoda Fabia S2000	2:42:45.0	+10:25.6	2
10	(Belgium) David Croes	(Belgium) Eric Tack	(Japan) Mitsubishi Lancer Evo X R4	2:44:27.1	+12:07.7	1
11	(Austria) Andreas Aigner	(Austria) Jürgen Heigl	(Japan) Subaru Impreza STi R4	2:45:56.5	+13:37.1	0
12	(France) Germain Bonnefis	(France) Olivier Fournier	(France) Renault Mégane RS	2:47:41.7	+15:22.3	0
13	(Belgium) Xavier Baugnet	(Belgium) Eric Borguet	(France) Peugeot 208 VTi R2	2:48:09.0	+15:49.6	0
14	(Netherlands) Timo van der Marel	(Australia) Rebecca Smart	(United States) Ford Fiesta R2	2:48:50.4	+16:31.0	0

=== Special stages ===
Day	Stage	Name	Length	Time	Winner	Time	Avg. spd.	Rally leader
Day 1 26 June	SS1	Dikkebus 1	14,30 km	17:00	(Belgium) Freddy Loix	8:12.4	104.5 km/h	(Belgium) Freddy Loix
Day 1 26 June	SS2	Wijtschate 1	24,89 km	17:35	(Belgium) Freddy Loix	13:20.5	111.9 km/h	(Belgium) Freddy Loix
Day 1 26 June	SS3	Langemark	13,82 km	18:24	(Belgium) Freddy Loix	7:45.1	107.0 km/h	(Belgium) Freddy Loix
Day 1 26 June	SS4	Dikkebus 2	14,30 km	20:15	(Belgium) Freddy Loix	8:37.4	99.5 km/h	(Belgium) Freddy Loix
Day 1 26 June	SS5	Wijtschate 2	24,89 km	21:15	(Belgium) Freddy Loix	14:00.3	106.6 km/h	(Belgium) Freddy Loix
Day 1 26 June	SS6	Mesen	9,66 km	21:35	(New Zealand) Hayden Paddon	6:00.4	96.5 km/h	(Belgium) Freddy Loix
Day 2 27 June	SS7	Vleteren - Krombeke 1	14,34 km	10:38	(Republic of Ireland) Craig Breen	7:48.2	110.3 km/h	(Belgium) Freddy Loix
Day 2 27 June	SS8	Watou 1	12,44 km	10:55	(Republic of Ireland) Craig Breen	6:53.3	108.4 km/h	(Belgium) Freddy Loix
Day 2 27 June	SS9	Westouter 1	7,39 km	11:13	(Republic of Ireland) Craig Breen	4:30.4	98.4 km/h	(Belgium) Freddy Loix
Day 2 27 June	SS10	Kemmelberg 1	14,19 km	11:42	(Republic of Ireland) Craig Breen	8:10.5	104.1 km/h	(Belgium) Freddy Loix
Day 2 27 June	SS11	Heuvelland 1	14,99 km	13:37	(Republic of Ireland) Craig Breen	8:22.0	107.5 km/h	(Belgium) Freddy Loix
Day 2 27 June	SS12	Lille-Eurométropole	9,85 km	14:32	(France) Bryan Bouffier	5:12.7	113.4 km/h	(Belgium) Freddy Loix
Day 2 27 June	SS13	Show Wasquehal	1,88 km	15:10	(Belgium) Freddy Loix	1:22.8	81.7 km/h	(Belgium) Freddy Loix
Day 2 27 June	SS14	Hollebeke 1	28,82 km	16:05	(France) Bryan Bouffier	16:30.4	104.8 km/h	(Belgium) Freddy Loix
Day 2 27 June	SS15	Vleteren - Krombeke 2	14,34 km	18:00	(France) Bryan Bouffier	7:34.4	113.6 km/h	(Belgium) Freddy Loix
Day 2 27 June	SS16	Watou 2	12,44 km	18:17	(France) Bryan Bouffier	6:41.1	111.7 km/h	(Belgium) Freddy Loix
Day 2 27 June	SS17	Westouter 2	7,39 km	18:35	(Republic of Ireland) Craig Breen	4:21.1	101.9 km/h	(Belgium) Freddy Loix
Day 2 27 June	SS18	Kemmelberg 2	14,19 km	19:04	(France) Bryan Bouffier	8:01.0	106.2 km/h	(Belgium) Freddy Loix
Day 2 27 June	SS19	Heuvelland 2	14,99 km	20:59	(France) Bryan Bouffier	8:13.1	109.4 km/h	(Belgium) Freddy Loix
Day 2 27 June	SS20	Hollebeke 2	28,82 km	21:35	Stage cancelled			(Belgium) Freddy Loix
