= 2013 Tour de Corse =

Tour de Corse 2013
Round 5 of the 2013 European Rally Championship season
← Previous event	Next event →
- Host country: France
- Rally base: Ajaccio
- Dates run: 17 – 18 May 2013
- Stages: 11 (248 km; 154 miles)
- Stage surface: Tarmac

Statistics
- Crews: 18 (ERC only) at start, 9 (ERC only) at finish

The 2013 Tour de Corse, formally the 56. Tour de Corse, was the fifth round of the 2013 European Rally Championship season. Bryan Bouffier took his first ever European Rally Championship (ERC) victory, with the rally also being the first ERC victory for the Peugeot 207 S2000 that he drove. The 2WD category was won by Kornél Lukács in a Citroën C2 R2 MAX, whilst the Production Cup was won by Andreas Aigner in a Subaru Impreza STi R4.

== Results ==
Pos.	Driver	Co-driver	Car	Time	Difference	Points
1	(France) Bryan Bouffier	(France) Xavier Panseri	(France) Peugeot 207 S2000	2:41:58.2	–	25+13
2	(Czech Republic) Jan Kopecký	(Czech Republic) Pavel Dresler	(Czech Republic) Škoda Fabia S2000	2:42:38.0	+39.8	18+13
3	(France) Stéphane Sarrazin	(France) Jacques-Julien Renucci	(United Kingdom) Mini John Cooper Works S2000	2:43:35.8	+1:37.6	15+9
4	(Republic of Ireland) Craig Breen	(Republic of Ireland) Paul Nagle	(France) Peugeot 207 S2000	2:43:39.0	+1:40.8	12+9
5	(France) François Delecour	(France) Dominique Savignoni	(France) Peugeot 207 S2000	2:45:23.2	+3:25.0	10+6
6	(France) Julien Maurin	(France) Nicolas Klinger	(United Kingdom) Ford Fiesta RRC	2:45:35.8	+3:37.6	8+4
7	(Austria) Andreas Aigner	(Austria) Jürgen Heigl	(Japan) Subaru Impreza R4	2:49:52.1	+7:53.9	6+1
8	(France) Jean-Matthieu Leandri	(Belgium) Renaud Jamoul	(France) Peugeot 207 S2000	2:50:46.0	+8:47.8	4
9	(France) Germain Bonnefis	(France) Olivier Fournier	(France) Renault Mégane RS	2:51:15.0	+9:16.8	2
10	(France) Jean-Michel Raoux	(France) Francis Mazotti	(France) Peugeot 207 S2000	2:55:52.5	+13:54.3	1

=== Special stages ===
Day	Stage	Name	Length	Time	Winner	Time	Avg. spd.	Rally leader
Day 1 17 May	SS1	La Fangu - ND de la Serra	27,53 km	08:23	(Republic of Ireland) Craig Breen	16:29.0	100.2 km/h	(Republic of Ireland) Craig Breen
Day 1 17 May	SS2	Erbajolo - Pont d´Altani 1	24,57 km	11:06	(Republic of Ireland) Craig Breen	15:23.0	95.8 km/h	(Republic of Ireland) Craig Breen
Day 1 17 May	SS3	Barchetta - La Porta 1	23,24 km	14:18	(Republic of Ireland) Craig Breen	15:36.2	89.4 km/h	(Republic of Ireland) Craig Breen
Day 1 17 May	SS4	Taverna - Pont de Castirla	15,28 km	15:21	(Poland) Robert Kubica	9:14.7	99.2 km/h	(Poland) Robert Kubica
Day 1 17 May	SS5	Barchetta - La Porta 2	23,24 km	18:01	(Republic of Ireland) Craig Breen	15:50.0	88.1 km/h	(France) Bryan Bouffier
Day 1 17 May	SS6	Erbajolo - Pont d´Altani 2	24,57 km	20:06	(Czech Republic) Jan Kopecký	15:32.7	94.8 km/h	(Czech Republic) Jan Kopecký
Day 2 18 May	SS7	Carbuccia - Tavera 1	16,89 km	10:48	(France) Bryan Bouffier	12:03.7	84.0 km/h	(France) Bryan Bouffier
Day 2 18 May	SS8	Sarrola - Liamone 1	26,70 km	12:06	(France) Bryan Bouffier	17:50.0	89.8 km/h	(France) Bryan Bouffier
Day 2 18 May	SS9	Marato - Acqua Doria	22,47 km	13:37	(Czech Republic) Jan Kopecký	13:28.2	100.1 km/h	(France) Bryan Bouffier
Day 2 18 May	SS10	Carbuccia - Tavera 2	16,89 km	16:40	(France) Bryan Bouffier	11:55.1	85.0 km/h	(France) Bryan Bouffier
Day 2 18 May	SS11	Sarrola - Liamone 2	26,70 km	18:06	(France) Bryan Bouffier	17:39.8	90.7 km/h	(France) Bryan Bouffier
