= 2013 Rally Poland =

International automobile rally competition

Rally Poland 2013
Round 9 of the 2013 European Rally Championship season
← Previous event	Next event →
- Host country: Poland
- Rally base: Mikołajki
- Dates run: 13 September – 15 September 2013
- Stages: 13 (230 km; 140 miles)
- Stage surface: Gravel

Statistics
- Crews: 21 (ERC only) at start, 18 (ERC only) at finish

The 2013 Rally Poland, formally known as the 70. Rajd Polski, was the ninth round of the 2013 European Rally Championship season.

== Results ==
Pos.	Driver	Co-driver	Car	Time	Difference	Points
1	(Poland) Kajetan Kajetanowicz	(Poland) Jarosław Baran	(United Kingdom) Ford Fiesta R5	1:58:40.6	–	25+13
2	(France) Bryan Bouffier	(France) Xavier Panseri	(France) Peugeot 207 S2000	1:59:03.9	+23.3	18+12
3	(Czech Republic) Jan Kopecký	(Czech Republic) Pavel Dresler	(Czech Republic) Škoda Fabia S2000	2:00:09.0	+1:28.4	15+10
4	(Poland) Michał Kościuszko	(Poland) Maciej Szczepaniak	(United Kingdom) Ford Fiesta R5	2:00:54.7	+2:14.1	12+6
5	(Poland) Krzysztof Hołowczyc	(Poland) Łukasz Kurzeja	(United Kingdom) Ford Fiesta RRC	2:01:56.1	+3:15.5	10+5
6	(Poland) Michał Sołowow	(Poland) Sebastian Rozwadowski	(United Kingdom) Ford Fiesta RRC	2:01:58.0	+3:17.4	8+5
7	(Republic of Ireland) Craig Breen	(Belgium) Lara Vanneste	(France) Peugeot 207 S2000	2:02:14.1	+3:33.5	6+1
8	(Poland) Zbigniew Staniszewski	(Poland) Paweł Drahan	(United Kingdom) Ford Fiesta RRC	2:02:28.8	+3:48.2	4+1
9	(Russia) Vasiliy Gryazin	(Russia) Dmitry Chumak	(United Kingdom) Ford Fiesta S2000	2:02:48.6	+4:08.0	2+3
10	(Poland) Maciej Oleksowicz	(Poland) Michał Kuśnierz	(United Kingdom) Ford Fiesta S2000	2:02:54.1	+4:13.5	1

=== Special stages ===
Day	Stage	Name	Length	Time	Winner	Time	Avg. spd.	Rally leader
Day 1 14 September	SS1	Talty 1	14.54 km	08:48	(France) Bryan Bouffier	4:01.9	91.5 km/h	(France) Bryan Bouffier
Day 1 14 September	SS2	Baranowo 1	17.51 km	9:40	(France) Bryan Bouffier	6:30.7	111.6 km/h	(France) Bryan Bouffier
Day 1 14 September	SS3	Mragowo 1	25.16 km	11:36	(Poland) Robert Kubica	16:01.3	94.2 km/h	(France) Bryan Bouffier
Day 1 14 September	SS4	Talty 2	14.54 km	14:10	(France) Bryan Bouffier	4:00.6	92.0 km/h	(France) Bryan Bouffier
Day 1 14 September	SS5	Baranowo 2	17.51 km	15:02	(Estonia) Martin Kangur	6:29.9	111.8 km/h	(France) Bryan Bouffier
Day 1 14 September	SS6	Mikolajki	2.50 km	16:11	(Poland) Robert Kubica	1:49.3	82.3 km/h	(France) Bryan Bouffier
Day 1 14 September	SS7	Mragowo 2	25.16 km	18:06	(Poland) Kajetan Kajetanowicz	16:07.6	93.6 km/h	(France) Bryan Bouffier
Day 2 15 September	SS8	Biskupiec 1	15.58 km	07:05	(Poland) Kajetan Kajetanowicz	8:17.6	112.7 km/h	(France) Bryan Bouffier
Day 2 15 September	SS9	Uzranki 1	15.14 km	08:17	(Poland) Kajetan Kajetanowicz	8:35.3	105.8 km/h	(Poland) Kajetan Kajetanowicz
Day 2 15 September	SS10	Mateuszek 1	26.02 km	10:06	(Czech Republic) Jan Kopecký	14:49.9	105.2 km/h	(Poland) Kajetan Kajetanowicz
Day 2 15 September	SS11	Biskupiec 2	15.58 km	15:05	(France) Bryan Bouffier	8:07.8	115.0 km/h	(Poland) Kajetan Kajetanowicz
Day 2 15 September	SS12	Uzranki 2	15.14 km	16:17	(Estonia) Martin Kangur	8:34.9	105.9 km/h	(Poland) Kajetan Kajetanowicz
Day 2 15 September	SS13	Mateuszek 2	26.02 km	18:06	(Poland) Kajetan Kajetanowicz	14:41.7	106.2 km/h	(Poland) Kajetan Kajetanowicz
