= Barum Czech Rally Zlín =

Rally competition in the Czech Republic

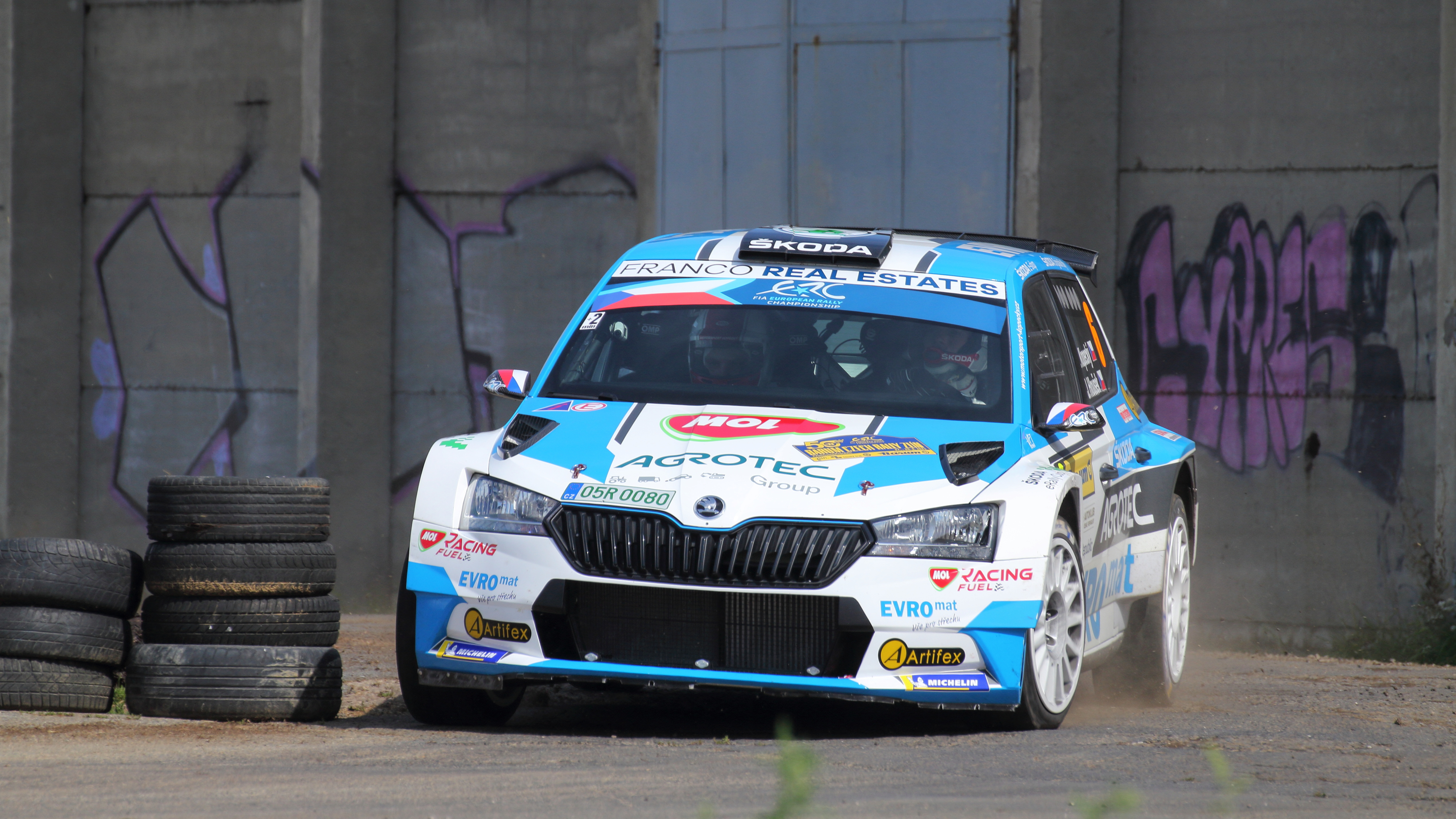
Jan Kopecký and co-driver Jan Hloušek driving a Škoda Fabia Rally2 Evo at the 50th Barum Czech Rally Zlín 2021

The Barum Czech Rally Zlín (also called Barum Rallye and Barum Rally Zlín), is a tarmac rally held in Zlín, Czech Republic. It is currently part of the European Rally Championship and previously has been part of the Intercontinental Rally Challenge.

Founded in 1971, it has been a round of the Czechoslovakia Rally Championship in its earliest days. It would later become a round of the Mitropa Cup, the Alpe Adria Rally Cup and since 1984, the European Rally Championship. The Austrian Rally Championship would later take in the event. The division of Czechoslovakia in 1992 saw the domestic series rebrands as the Czech-Slovak Rally Championship before finally splitting into separate championships as the Czech Republic Rally Championship and the Slovak Rally Championship in 1994. At the same time the rally became part of the new Central European Zone Rally Championship and, like the Slovak series would intermittently include the rally in their championship. It became part of the short-lived Intercontinental Rally Challenge.

The rally is held in the forests to the east of Zlin towards the Czech border with Slovakia. In recent years the rally has become dominated by Jan Kopecký who has won his home event ten times.

== Previous winners ==
Year	Driver	Co-driver	Car
1971	(Czech Republic) Jan Halmazňa	(Czech Republic) Kostruh	Škoda 1100 MB
1972	(Czech Republic) Vladimír Hubáček	(Czech Republic) Ing. Vojtěch Rieger	Renault Alpine
1973	(Czech Republic) Vladimír Hubáček	(Czech Republic) Stanislav Minařík	Renault Alpine
1974	(Germany) Wolfgang Hauck	(Germany) Willi Peter Pitz	Porsche Carrera 911 SC
1975	(Czech Republic) Vladimír Hubáček	(Czech Republic) Stanislav Minařík	Renault Alpine
1976	(Norway) John Haugland	(Norway) Arild Antonsen	Škoda 130RS
1977	(Czech Republic) Václav Blahna	(Czech Republic) Lubislav Hlávka	Škoda 130RS
1978	(Czech Republic) Ing. Jiří Šedivý	(Czech Republic) Jiří Janeček	Škoda 130RS
1979	(Norway) John Haugland	(Sweden) Jan-Olof Bohlin	Škoda 130RS
1980	(Norway) John Haugland	(Sweden) Jan-Olof Bohlin	Škoda 130RS
1981	(Italy) Antonio Zanussi	(Italy) Stefano Fachin	Porsche Carrera 911 SC
1982	(Austria) Gerhard Kalnay	(Austria) Ferdinand Hinterleitner	Opel Ascona 400
1983	(Czech Republic) Ladislav Křeček	(Czech Republic) Bořivoj Motl	Škoda 130RS
1984	(Germany) Harald Demuth	(Belgium) Willy Lux	Audi 80 Quattro
1985	(Germany) Harald Demuth	(Italy) Emilio Radaelli	Audi Quattro A2
1986	(Czech Republic) Leo Pavlík	(Czech Republic) Karel Jirátko	Audi Quattro A2
1987	(Hungary) Attila Ferjancz	(Hungary) János Tandari	Audi Coupé Quattro
1988	(Austria) Franz Wittmann	(Austria) Jörg Pattermann	Lancia Delta HF 4WD
1989	(Austria) Franz Wittmann	(Austria) Jörg Pattermann	Lancia Delta HF 4WD
1990	(Finland) Mikael Sundström	(Finland) Juha Repo	Mazda 323 4WD
1991	(Belgium) Patrick Snijers	(Belgium) Dany Colebunders	Ford Sierra Cosworth 4x4
1992	(Germany) Erwin Weber	(Germany) Manfred Hiemer	Mitsubishi Galant VR-4
1993	(Austria) Raimund Baumschlager	(Germany) Klaus Wicha	Ford Escort RS Cosworth
1994	(Belgium) Patrick Snijers	(Belgium) Dany Colebunders	Ford Escort RS Cosworth
1995	(Italy) Enrico Bertone	(Italy) Massimo Chiapponi	Toyota Celica Turbo 4WD
1996	(Czech Republic) Stanislav Chovanec	(Czech Republic) Henrich Kurus	Ford Escort RS Cosworth
1997	(Italy) Enrico Bertone	(Czech Republic) Michal Kočí	Toyota Celica 4WD
1998	(Italy) Enrico Bertone	(Czech Republic) Michal Kočí	Toyota Celica GT-Four
1999	(Poland) Janusz Kulig	(Slovakia) Emil Horniaček	Toyota Celica GT-Four
2000	(Czech Republic) Roman Kresta	(Czech Republic) Jan Tománek	Škoda Octavia WRC
2001	(Czech Republic) Roman Kresta	(Czech Republic) Jan Tománek	Škoda Octavia WRC Evo.2
2002	(Italy) Renato Travaglia	(Italy) Flavio Zanella	Peugeot 206 WRC
2003	(Czech Republic) Václav Pech	(Czech Republic) Petr Uhel	Ford Focus RS WRC 01
2004	(France) Simon Jean-Joseph	(France) Jack Boyère	Renault Clio S1600
2005	(Italy) Renato Travaglia	(Italy) Flavio Zanella	Renault Clio S1600
2006	(Czech Republic) Roman Kresta	(Czech Republic) Petr Gross	Mitsubishi Lancer Evolution IX
2007	(France) Nicolas Vouilloz	(France) Nicolas Klinger	Peugeot 207 S2000
2008	(Belgium) Freddy Loix	(Belgium) Robin Buysmans	Peugeot 207 S2000
2009	(Czech Republic) Jan Kopecký	(Czech Republic) Petr Starý	Škoda Fabia S2000
2010	(Belgium) Freddy Loix	(Belgium) Frederic Miclotte	Škoda Fabia S2000 Evo 2
2011	(Czech Republic) Jan Kopecký	(Czech Republic) Petr Starý	Škoda Fabia S2000 Evo 2
2012	(Finland) Juho Hänninen	(Finland) Mikko Markkula	Škoda Fabia S2000 Evo 2
2013	(Czech Republic) Jan Kopecký	(Czech Republic) Pavel Dresler	Škoda Fabia S2000
2014	(Czech Republic) Václav Pech	(Czech Republic) Petr Uhel	Mini John Cooper Works S2000
2015	(Czech Republic) Jan Kopecký	(Czech Republic) Pavel Dresler	Škoda Fabia R5
2016	(Czech Republic) Jan Kopecký	(Czech Republic) Pavel Dresler	Škoda Fabia R5
2017	(Czech Republic) Jan Kopecký	(Czech Republic) Pavel Dresler	Škoda Fabia R5
2018	(Czech Republic) Jan Kopecký	(Czech Republic) Pavel Dresler	Škoda Fabia R5
2019	(Czech Republic) Jan Kopecký	(Czech Republic) Pavel Dresler	Škoda Fabia R5
2020	cancelled due to the COVID-19		
2021	(Czech Republic) Jan Kopecký	(Czech Republic) Jan Hloušek	Škoda Fabia Rally2 evo
2022	(Czech Republic) Jan Kopecký	(Czech Republic) Jan Hloušek	Škoda Fabia Rally2 evo
2023	(Czech Republic) Jan Kopecký (Note: The absolute fastest time was recorded by Václav Pech and Petr Uhel in Ford Focus RS WRC '06, but they entered the rally as non-championship entry.)	(Czech Republic) Jan Hloušek	Škoda Fabia RS Rally2
2024	(Czech Republic) Dominik Stříteský	(Czech Republic) Jiří Hovorka	Škoda Fabia RS Rally2
2025	(Czech Republic) Jan Kopecký	(Czech Republic) Jiří Hovorka	Škoda Fabia RS Rally2
2026	(Czech Republic) Adam Březík	(Czech Republic) Zdeněk Bělák	Škoda Fabia RS Rally2

== Multiple winners of the Barum Rally Zlín ==
# Wins	Driver	Years won
12	(Czech Republic) Jan Kopecký	2009, 2011, 2013, 2015, 2016, 2017, 2018, 2019, 2021, 2022, 2023, 2025
3	(Czech Republic) Vladimír Hubáček	1972, 1973, 1975
3	(Norway) John Haugland	1976, 1979, 1980
3	(Italy) Enrico Bertone	1995, 1997, 1998
3	(Czech Republic) Roman Kresta	2000, 2001, 2006
2	(Czech Republic) Václav Pech	2003, 2014
2	(Germany) Harald Demuth	1984, 1985
2	(Austria) Franz Wittmann	1988, 1989
2	(Belgium) Patrick Snijers	1992, 1994
2	(Italy) Renato Travaglia	2002, 2005
2	(Belgium) Freddy Loix	2008, 2010
