= 2013 Croatia Rally =

Croatia Rally 2013
Round 10 of the 2013 European Rally Championship
| ← Previous event | Next event → |
- Host country: Croatia
- Rally base: Poreč
- Dates run: 26 September – 28 September 2013
- Stages: 14 (239 km; 149 miles)
- Stage surface: Asphalt

Statistics
- Crews: 7 (ERC only) at start, 6 (ERC only) at finish

The 2013 Croatia Rally, formally the 40. Croatia Rally, was the tenth round of the 2013 European Rally Championship season.

== Results ==
| Pos. | Driver | Co-driver | Car | Time | Difference | Points |
|---|---|---|---|---|---|---|
| 1 | (Czech Republic) Jan Kopecký | (Czech Republic) Pavel Dresler | Škoda Fabia S2000 | 2:23:11.0 | – | 25+14 |
| 2 | (Austria) Andreas Aigner | (Austria) Barbara Watzl | Subaru Impreza R4 | 2:25:06.6 | +1:55.6 | 18+11 |
| 3 | (Germany) Hermann Gassner | (Germany) Ursula Mayrhofer | Mitsubishi Lancer Evo X R4 | 2:25:20.8 | +2:09.8 | 15+9 |
| 4 | (Belgium) Pieter Tsjoen | (Belgium) Bernd Casier | Škoda Fabia S2000 | 2:26:05.3 | +2:54.3 | 12+10 |
| 5 | (South Africa) Henk Lategan | (South Africa) Barry White | Škoda Fabia S2000 | 2:27:15.6 | +4:04.6 | 10+5 |
| 6 | (Hungary) András Hadik | (Hungary) Krisztián Kertész | Subaru Impreza R4 | 2:30:00.0 | +6:49.0 | 8+2 |
| 7 | (Slovenia) Aleks Humar | (Slovenia) Florjan Rus | Renault Clio R3 | 2:30:10.5 | +6:59.5 | 6+2 |
| 8 | (Croatia) Daniel Šaškin | (Croatia) Damir Bruner | Ford Fiesta RRC | 2:31:09.8 | +7:58.8 | 4 |
| 9 | (Slovenia) Jani Trček | (Slovenia) Viljem Ošlaj | Mitsubishi Lancer Evo IX | 2:33:03.3 | +9:52.3 | 2 |
| 10 | (Hungary) Zoltán Bessenyey | (Hungary) Julianna Nyírfás | Honda Civic Type-R R3 | 2:33:17.5 | +10:06.5 | 1 |

=== Special stages ===
| Day | Stage | Name | Length | Time | Winner | Time | Avg. spd. | Rally leader |
|---|---|---|---|---|---|---|---|---|
| Day 1 26 September | SS1 | Poreč 1 | 1.70 km | 18:17 | (Croatia) Juraj Šebalj | 1:38.4 | 62.2 km/h | (Croatia) Juraj Šebalj |
| Day 2 27 September | SS2 | Boljun 1 | 14.97 km | 10:19 | (Austria) Andreas Aigner | 10:13.9 | 87.8 km/h | (Austria) Andreas Aigner |
| Day 2 27 September | SS3 | Učka 1 | 13.66 km | 10:52 | (Austria) Andreas Aigner | 9:29.8 | 86.3 km/h | (Austria) Andreas Aigner |
| Day 2 27 September | SS4 | Brest 1 | 29.86 km | 12:15 | (Czech Republic) Jan Kopecký | 16:20.8 | 109.6 km/h | (Austria) Andreas Aigner |
| Day 2 27 September | SS5 | Boljun 2 | 14.97 km | 15:33 | (Czech Republic) Jan Kopecký | 9:02.4 | 99.4 km/h | (Czech Republic) Jan Kopecký |
| Day 2 27 September | SS6 | Učka 2 | 13.66 km | 16:06 | (Czech Republic) Jan Kopecký | 8:34.0 | 95.7 km/h | (Czech Republic) Jan Kopecký |
| Day 2 27 September | SS7 | Brest 2 | 29.86 km | 17:29 | (Czech Republic) Jan Kopecký | 15:41.2 | 114.2 km/h | (Czech Republic) Jan Kopecký |
| Day 3 28 September | SS8 | Butoniga 1 | 14.97 km | 09:59 | (Czech Republic) Jan Kopecký | 9:24.0 | 95.6 km/h | (Czech Republic) Jan Kopecký |
| Day 3 28 September | SS9 | Buzet 1 | 14.52 km | 10:22 | (Czech Republic) Jan Kopecký | 8:25.6 | 103.4 km/h | (Czech Republic) Jan Kopecký |
| Day 3 28 September | SS10 | Salteria 1 | 29.88 km | 10:55 | (Belgium) Pieter Tsjoen | 16:59.7 | 105.5 km/h | (Czech Republic) Jan Kopecký |
| Day 3 28 September | SS11 | Butoniga 2 | 14.97 km | 13:23 | (Czech Republic) Jan Kopecký | 9:11.9 | 97.6 km/h | (Czech Republic) Jan Kopecký |
| Day 3 28 September | SS12 | Buzet 2 | 14.52 km | 13:46 | (Czech Republic) Jan Kopecký | 8:44.0 | 99.8 km/h | (Czech Republic) Jan Kopecký |
| Day 3 28 September | SS13 | Salteria 2 | 29.88 km | 14:19 | (Czech Republic) Jan Kopecký | 16:58.2 | 105.6 km/h | (Czech Republic) Jan Kopecký |
| Day 3 28 September | SS14 | Poreč 2 | 1.70 km | 16:30 | (Belgium) Pieter Tsjoen | 1:38.7 | 62.0 km/h | (Czech Republic) Jan Kopecký |
