= 2013 Rallye Açores =

SATA Rallye Açores 2013
Round 4 of the 2013 European Rally Championship season
← Previous event	Next event →
- Host country: Portugal
- Rally base: Ponta Delgada
- Dates run: 25 – 27 April 2013
- Stages: 19 (230 km; 140 miles)
- Stage surface: Gravel

Statistics
- Crews: 24 (ERC only) at start, 14 (ERC only) at finish

The SATA Rallye Açores was the fourth round of the 2013 European Rally Championship. The stages were gravel.

== Results ==
Pos.	Driver	Co-driver	Car	Time	Difference	Points
1	(Czech Republic) Jan Kopecký	(Czech Republic) Pavel Dresler	Škoda Fabia S2000	2:26:32.2		25+14
2	(Republic of Ireland) Craig Breen	(Republic of Ireland) David Moynihan	Peugeot 207 S2000	2:27:04.4	+32.2	18+12
3	(Portugal) Ricardo Moura	(Portugal) Sancho Eiró	Škoda Fabia S2000	2:27:31.0	+58.8	15+10
4	(Portugal) Bruno Magalhães	(Portugal) Nuno Rodrigues da Silva	Peugeot 207 S2000	2:29:09.8	+2:37.6	12+7
5	(France) Jérémi Ancian	(France) Gilles De Turckheim	Peugeot 207 S2000	2:29:59.6	+3:27.4	10+7
6	(Poland) Robert Kubica	(Poland) Maciej Baran	Citroen DS3	2:35:51.3	+9:19.1	8+4
7	(Italy) Alessandro Bruschetta	(Italy) Justin Baraini	Subaru Impreza R4	2:41:29.6	+14:57.4	6+1
8	(Portugal) Luis Rego	(Portugal) José Pedro Silva	Mitsubishi Lancer Evo IX	2:43:08.2	+16:36.0	4
9	(Czech Republic) Antonín Tlusťák	(Czech Republic) Lukáš Vyoral	Škoda Fabia S2000	2:44:14.3	+17:42.1	2
10	(Italy) Marco Tempestini	(Romania) Dorin Pulpea	Subaru Impreza R4	2:44:42.8	+18:10.6	1

=== Special stages ===
Day	Stage	Name	Length	Time	Winner	Time	Avg. spd.	Rally leader
Day 1 25 April	SS1	Coroa da Mata 1	8,25 km	15:29	Stage cancelled			
Day 1 25 April	SS2	São Brás / Vila Franca 1	6,14 km	16:02	(Poland) Robert Kubica	4:51.1	75.9 km/h	(Poland) Robert Kubica
Day 1 25 April	SS3	Lagoa 1	7,91 km	16:52	(Poland) Robert Kubica	4:21.3	109.0 km/h	(Poland) Robert Kubica
Day 1 25 April	SS4	Grupo Marques 1	2,20 km	17:20	(Poland) Robert Kubica	2:01.1	65.4 km/h	(Poland) Robert Kubica
Day 2 26 April	SS5	Lagoa 2	7,91 km	10:50	(Poland) Robert Kubica	4:14.8	111.8 km/h	(Poland) Robert Kubica
Day 2 26 April	SS6	Batalha Golfe 1	7,86 km	11:14	(Poland) Robert Kubica	5:40.9	83.0 km/h	(Poland) Robert Kubica
Day 2 26 April	SS7	Feteiras 1	7,54 km	12:04	(Czech Republic) Jan Kopecký	5:45.0	78.7 km/h	(Poland) Robert Kubica
Day 2 26 April	SS8	Sete Cidades 1	23,97 km	12:36	(Portugal) Bernardo Sousa	18:29.4	77.8 km/h	(Czech Republic) Jan Kopecký
Day 2 26 April	SS9	Coroa da Mata 2	7,86 km	15:04	(Portugal) Bernardo Sousa	7:13.2	65.3 km/h	(Czech Republic) Jan Kopecký
Day 2 26 April	SS10	Batalha Golfe 2	7,86 km	15:44	(Poland) Robert Kubica	5:42.7	82.6 km/h	(Czech Republic) Jan Kopecký
Day 2 26 April	SS11	Feteiras 2	7,54 km	16:34	(Republic of Ireland) Craig Breen	5:58.6	75.7 km/h	(Czech Republic) Jan Kopecký
Day 2 26 April	SS12	Sete Cidades 2	23,97 km	17:06	Stage cancelled			(Czech Republic) Jan Kopecký
Day 3 27 April	SS13	Graminhais 1	20,82 km	09:21	(Czech Republic) Jan Kopecký	16:08.3	77.4 km/h	(Czech Republic) Jan Kopecký
Day 3 27 April	SS14	Tronqueira 1	21,33 km	10:21	(Portugal) Ricardo Moura	18:27.3	69.3 km/h	(Czech Republic) Jan Kopecký
Day 3 27 April	SS15	São Brás / Vila Franca 2	6,14 km	11:26	(Czech Republic) Jan Kopecký	4:52.1	75.7 km/h	(Czech Republic) Jan Kopecký
Day 3 27 April	SS16	Grupo Marques 2	2,20 km	12:33	(Poland) Robert Kubica	2:02.3	64.8 km/h	(Czech Republic) Jan Kopecký
Day 3 27 April	SS17	Lomba da Maia	8,27 km	15:14	(Czech Republic) Jan Kopecký	5:37.9	88.1 km/h	(Czech Republic) Jan Kopecký
Day 3 27 April	SS18	Graminhais 2	20,82 km	16:06	(Czech Republic) Jan Kopecký	15:50.0	78.9 km/h	(Czech Republic) Jan Kopecký
Day 3 27 April	SS19	Tronqueira 2	21,33 km	17:06	(Czech Republic) Jan Kopecký	18:20.4	69.8 km/h	(Czech Republic) Jan Kopecký
