= 2013 Sibiu Rally Romania =

Seventh round of the 2013 European Rally Championship season

Sibiu Rally Romania 2013
Round 7 of the 2013 European Rally Championship season
| ← Previous event | Next event → |
- Host country: Romania
- Rally base: Sibiu
- Dates run: 25 – 27 July 2013
- Stages: 14 (216 km; 134 miles)
- Stage surface: Gravel

Statistics
- Crews: 4 (ERC only) at start, 3 (ERC only) at finish

The 2013 Sibiu Rally Romania, formally the 13. Sibiu Rally Romania, was the seventh round of the 2013 European Rally Championship season.

== Results ==
| Pos. | Driver | Co-driver | Car | Time | Difference | Points |
|---|---|---|---|---|---|---|
| 1 | (Czech Republic) Jan Kopecký | (Czech Republic) Pavel Dresler | (Czech Republic) Škoda Fabia S2000 | 2:18:07.8 | – | 25+14 |
| 2 | (France) François Delecour | (France) Dominique Savignoni | (France) Peugeot 207 S2000 | 2:21:10.6 | +3:02.8 | 18+9 |
| 3 | (Japan) Toshihiro Arai | (Australia) Anthony McLoughlin | (Japan) Subaru Impreza R4 | 2:24:11.4 | +6:03.6 | 15+8 |
| 4 | (Italy) Marco Tempestini | (Italy) Lucio Baggio | (Czech Republic) Škoda Fabia S2000 | 2:25:40.9 | +7:33.1 | 12+3 |
| 5 | (Hungary) David Botka | (Hungary) Péter Mihalik | (Japan) Mitsubishi Lancer Evo IX | 2:25:56.1 | +7:48.3 | 10+5 |
| 6 | (Romania) Valentin Porcișteanu | (Romania) Mihai Daniel Dobre | (Japan) Mitsubishi Lancer Evo X | 2:26:47.6 | +8:39.8 | 8+6 |
| 7 | (Czech Republic) Jaroslav Orsák | (Czech Republic) Lukáš Kostka | (Japan) Mitsubishi Lancer Evo IX R4 | 2:27:23.4 | +9:15.6 | 6+2 |
| 8 | (Hungary) János Puskádi | (Hungary) Barnabás Gódor | (Czech Republic) Škoda Fabia S2000 | 2:28:07.2 | +9:59.4 | 4 |
| 9 | (Czech Republic) Antonín Tlusťák | (Czech Republic) Lukáš Vyoral | (Czech Republic) Škoda Fabia S2000 | 2:29:46.9 | +11:39.1 | 2 |
| 10 | (Romania) Daniel Ungur | (Romania) Anton Avram | (Japan) Mitsubishi Lancer Evo VI | 2:33:25.1 | +15:17.3 | 1 |

=== Special stages ===
| Day | Stage | Name | Length | Time | Winner | Time | Avg. spd. | Rally leader |
|---|---|---|---|---|---|---|---|---|
| Day 1 26 July | SS1 | Dobarca 1 | 6,92 km | 14:01 | (France) François Delecour | 4:23.7 | 94.5 km/h | (France) François Delecour |
| Day 1 26 July | SS2 | Crinti 1 | 27,00 km | 14:44 | (France) Bryan Bouffier | 19:51.0 | 81.6 km/h | (France) Bryan Bouffier |
| Day 1 26 July | SS3 | Dobarca 2 | 6,92 km | 17:52 | (Czech Republic) Jan Kopecký | 4:15.3 | 97.6 km/h | (France) Bryan Bouffier |
| Day 1 26 July | SS4 | Crinti 2 | 27,00 km | 18:35 | (Czech Republic) Jan Kopecký | 19:38.4 | 82.5 km/h | (Czech Republic) Jan Kopecký |
| Day 1 26 July | SS5 | Superspeciala 1 | 3,50 km | 19:38 | (Czech Republic) Jan Kopecký | 3:22.2 | 62.3 km/h | (Czech Republic) Jan Kopecký |
| Day 1 26 July | SS6 | Paltinis | 9,00 km | 21:48 | (Czech Republic) Jan Kopecký | 5:54.6 | 91.4 km/h | (Czech Republic) Jan Kopecký |
| Day 1 26 July | SS7 | Santa | 15,50 km | 22:11 | (France) François Delecour | 11:00.9 | 84.4 km/h | (Czech Republic) Jan Kopecký |
| Day 2 27 July | SS8 | Sadu 1 | 8,50 km | 10:27 | (Czech Republic) Jan Kopecký | 4:12.4 | 121.2 km/h | (Czech Republic) Jan Kopecký |
| Day 2 27 July | SS9 | Gatu Berbecului 1 | 30,00 km | 10:50 | (Czech Republic) Jan Kopecký | 21:39.5 | 83.1 km/h | (Czech Republic) Jan Kopecký |
| Day 2 27 July | SS10 | Santa Max 1 | 20,00 km | 11:43 | (Czech Republic) Jan Kopecký | 14:11.8 | 84.5 km/h | (Czech Republic) Jan Kopecký |
| Day 2 27 July | SS11 | Sadu 2 | 8,50 km | 14:08 | (Czech Republic) Jan Kopecký | 4:16.5 | 119.3 km/h | (Czech Republic) Jan Kopecký |
| Day 2 27 July | SS12 | Gatu Berbecului 2 | 30,00 km | 14:31 | (Czech Republic) Jan Kopecký | 21:39.5 | 83.1 km/h | (Czech Republic) Jan Kopecký |
| Day 2 27 July | SS13 | Santa Max 2 | 20,00 km | 15:24 | Stage cancelled | | | (Czech Republic) Jan Kopecký |
| Day 2 27 July | SS14 | Superspeciala 2 | 3,50 km | 17:34 | (Czech Republic) Jan Kopecký | 3:17.5 | 63.8 km/h | (Czech Republic) Jan Kopecký |
