= 2013 Rallye International du Valais =

2013 Rallye International du Valais: 54. Rallye International du Valais 2013
Round 12 of 12 of the 2013 European Rally Championship
← Previous event	Next event →
- Host country: Switzerland
- Rally base: (Switzerland) Martigny
- Dates run: 7 – 9 November 2013
- Stages: 18
- Stage surface: Tarmac

Statistics
- Crews: 68 at start, 49 at finish

Overall results
- Overall winner: (Finland) Esapekka Lappi; Škoda Motorsport

The 2013 Rallye International du Valais was the twelfth and final round of the 2013 European Rally Championship season, held in Switzerland between 7–9 November 2013.

== Results ==
Pos	No	Driver	Co-driver	Entrant	Car	Time/Retired	Points
1	3	(Finland) Esapekka Lappi	(Finland) Janne Ferm	Škoda Motorsport	Škoda Fabia S2000	3:13:42.8	38
2	8	(Switzerland) Olivier Burri	(Switzerland) André Saucy	Zero4Piu'	Ford Fiesta RRC	3:17:11.0	28
3	1	(Republic of Ireland) Craig Breen	(Belgium) Lara Vanneste	Peugeot Rally Academy	Peugeot 207 S2000	3:17:19.0	22
4	5	(France) Jérémi Ancian	(France) Olivier Vitrani	Peugeot Rally Academy	Peugeot 207 S2000	3:20:03.9	17
5	4	(Czech Republic) Jaroslav Orsák	(Czech Republic) Lukáš Kostka	GPD Mit Metal Racing Team	Škoda Fabia S2000	3:20:03.9	15
6	9	(Switzerland) Nicolas Althaus	(Switzerland) Alain Ioset	Lugano Racing Team	Peugeot 207 S2000	3:20:25.7	12
7	18	(Switzerland) Florian Gonon	(Luxembourg) Michel Horgnies	Lugano Racing Team	Subaru Impreza STi R4	3:21:40.5	8
8	12	(Switzerland) Pascal Perroud	(Switzerland) Quentin Marchand	Lugano Racing Team	Peugeot 207 S2000	3:26:58.7	4
9	27	(France) Sylvain Michel	(Switzerland) Sandra Arlettaz-Schmidly	Zero4Piu'	Citroën DS3 R3T	3:27:00.5	2
10	16	(France) Romain Salinas	(France) Benjamin Micheli	Renault Sport Technologies	Renault Mégane RS	3:27:55.2	1
