= Ivan Mishyn =

Ukrainian rally codriver

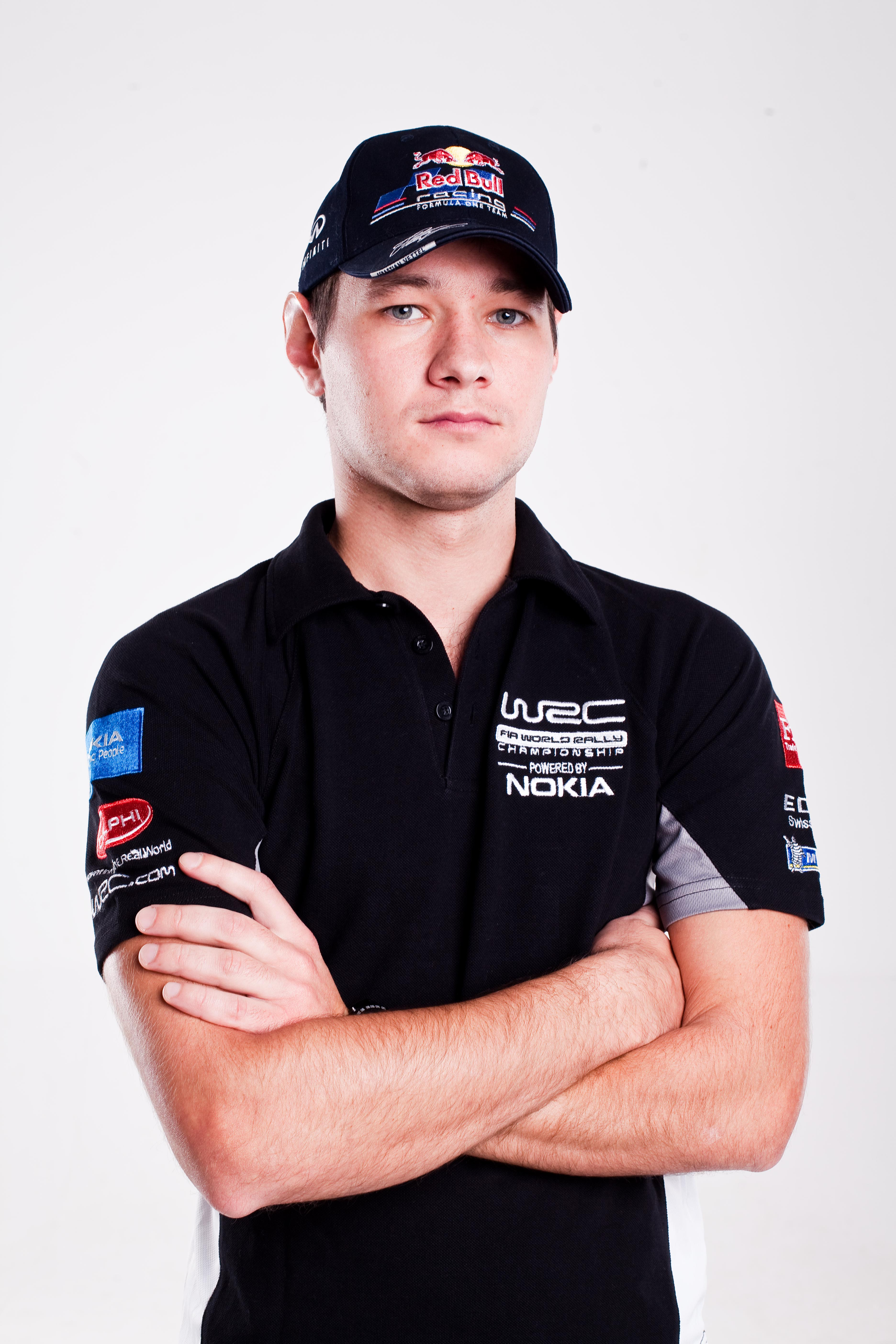
- Nationality: Ukrainian
- Born: March 31, 1985 (age 41) Odesa, Ukrainian Soviet Socialist Republic, USSR (present day Ukraine)

European Rally Championship career
- Debut season: 2013
- Current team: The Boar ProRacing
- Starts: 14
- Championships: 0 (ERC Production – 1)
- Wins: 0 (ERC Production – 1)
- Best finish: 37 (ERC Production – 1) in 2014

Previous series
- 2011–2012: Intercontinental Rally Challenge
- Statistics up to date as of 2014.12.10.

Ivan Mishyn (Ukrainian: Мішин Іван Віталійович; born March 31, 1985, Odesa, Ukrainian Soviet Socialist Republic) is a Ukrainian rally codriver, Ukrainian rally vice-champion, European rally champion in ERC Production Cup category, and The Boar ProRacing team codriver.

Mishyn is the only Ukrainian codriver and the only codriver from the former Soviet Union who has won the title of European Rally Champion.

== Career ==
=== Ukrainian Rally Championship ===
Mishyn's rallying career is inextricably linked to his childhood friend Vitaliy Pushkar. Friends began to visit rallies together as a fans, and also made their debut together as a professional rally crew, where Pushkar took the driver's role, and Mishyn became the codriver. Their first car was the all-wheel drive 2.0 liter Subaru Impreza, which was previously owned by another Odesa driver Igor Chapovsky.

During the 2009 season Pushkar and Mishyn started in 11 rallies with the only retirement at the Bukovina rally, due to technical problems. Such stability has helped friends to become a winners of Ukrainian rally Championship in U12 class for the first year of performances.

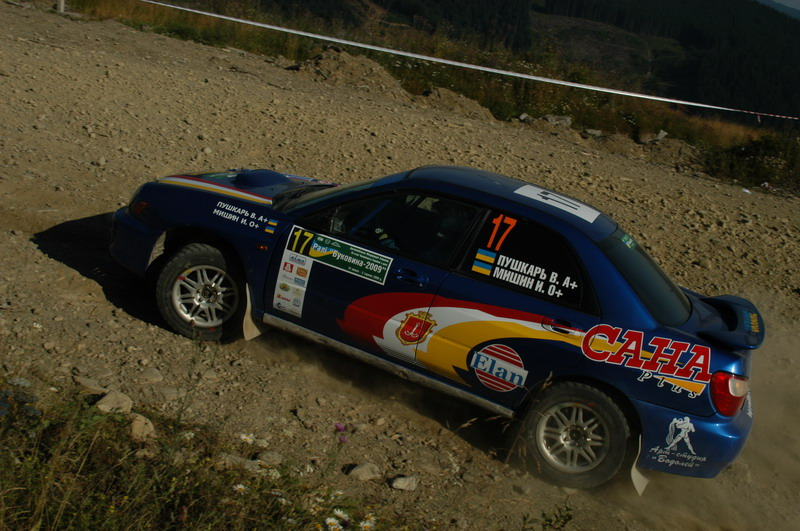
Vitaliy Pushkar and Ivan Mishyn on Bukovina rally, Chernivtsi, 2009

Deciding to continue motorsport career at a higher level, the crew changed the car from Subaru Impreza to more modern Mitsubishi Lancer Evo IX, which allows them to fight for victories in the Ukrainian national rally competitions. In the end of 2010, Pushkar and Mishyn got into the top-ten fastest Ukrainian crews. The following year, Odesites climbed a step up in the top-five and won its first international trophy - Cup of Friendship, which is held by Automobile Federations of Ukraine, Russia and Belarus together.

2013 became the most successful season for the crew at home competitions. As a part of Odesa Rally Team, Pushkar and Mishyn won the Chumatskyi Shlyakh Rally and became third in the Mariupol Rally which made them one of the season favorites, but retirement from Galicia Rally weakened their positions. The destiny of the championship had to be decided on the Ivano-Frankivsk Trembita Rally, and Pushkar and Mishyn won it - but this was not enough to get the title. Yuriy Kochmar and Sergiy Koval, another crew of Odesa Rally Team, became the Ukrainian class 3 champions leaving Pushkar and Mishyn on the second position.

=== Intercontinental Rally Challenge ===
From the 2010 season, Pushkar and Mishin are increasingly involved in international competitions. Starting from the several rounds of Latvian and Estonian championships, crew goes on with the Intercontinental Rally Challenge IRC, where they start collaborating with Lithuanian ProRacing team.

Developing the new Mitsubishi Lancer Evo X, the crew won his first major international race - Romanian Rally Sibiu and finished the 2012 season in sixth place in IRC Production. This success became the highest achievement of Ukrainians in this serie due to fusion of IRC and ERC according to Eurosport Events programme in late 2012.

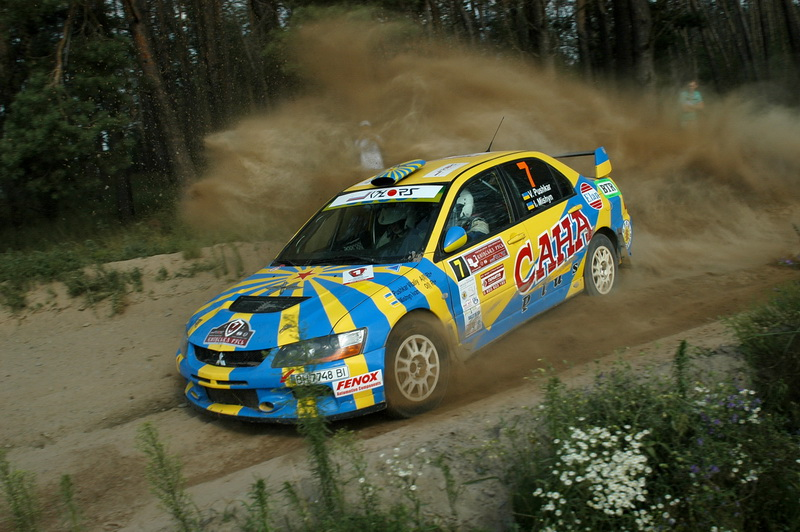
Vitaliy Pushkar and Ivan Mishyn on rally Kyivska Rus, Kyiv, 2011

=== European Rally Championship ===
2013 European Rally Championship season begins for the crew with a confident fifth place in the Latvian 2013 Rally Liepāja-Ventspils, but several retirements on Azores, Belgium and Romania are forced Pushkar and Mishyn stop the participating in ERC that year.

Crew returned to the ERC in 2014 starting the season with an accident at the Jänner Rally. Although, after that Pushkar and Mishyn finished second at the Rally Liepāja–Ventspils and won the Acropolis Rally. At the end of the season, crew safely finished at the Rallye du Valais and Tour de Corse, and after scoring 167 points became the European Rally Champions among the Production Car drivers and codrivers both.

== Starts with another drivers ==
Among the 79 races held in his career, there are only three where Mishyn started not with Vitaliy Pushkar. Twice he was the navigator of another Odesa driver, Dmytro Rotkevych, and the crew won the Belarusian rally «Braslau». In addition, once Mishyn started as a navigator of multiple Ukrainian Rally Champion Oleksandr Saliuk, Jr., with whom he started in the Tour de Corse, 2012 IRC but failed to get the finish due to technical reasons.

== International results ==
=== IRC ===
Year	Participant	Car	1	2	3	4	5	6	7	8	9	10	11	12	13	Pos.	Points
2012	Odesa Rally Team	Mitsubishi Lancer Evo IX	POR	ESP	IRL	FRA; Ret	ITA; 23	BEL; 31	SMR	ROU; 4	CZE	UKR; Ret	BGR	ITA; 25	CYP; 20	33rd	12

=== ERC ===
Year	Participant	Car	1	2	3	4	5	6	7	8	9	10	11	12	Pos.	Points
2013	The Boar ProRacing	Mitsubishi Lancer Evo X	AUT	LAT; 12	ESP	POR; Ret	FRA	BEL; Ret	ROU; Ret	CZE	POL	CRO	ITA	ITA	81st	1
2014	The Boar ProRacing	Mitsubishi Lancer Evo X	AUT; Ret	LAT; 8	ROU	GRC; 13	IRL	POR; Ret	BEL; 16	EST; 13	CZE; Ret	CYP; 9	ITA; 16	FRA; 17	37th	14

=== ERC Production Cup ===
Year	Participant	Car	1	2	3	4	5	6	7	8	9	10	11	12	Pos.	Points
2013	The Boar ProRacing	Mitsubishi Lancer Evo X	AUT	LAT; 5	ESP	POR; Ret	FRA	BEL; Ret	ROU; Ret	CZE	POL	CRO	ITA	ITA	24th	25
2014	The Boar ProRacing	Mitsubishi Lancer Evo X	AUT; Ret	LAT; 2	ROU	GRC; 1	IRL	POR; Ret	BEL; 6	EST; 5	CZE; Ret	CYP; 4	ITA; 3	FRA; 2	1st	167

== Interesting facts and figures ==
From 2009 until 2014, Mishyn entered 79 rallies, attaining 17th position in the Ukrainian Club 50 (drivers who have started in 50 or more rallies).

The joint Pushkar/Mishyn crew has 76 starts, second only amongst Ukrainian crews to Gorban/Leonov, with 88 joint starts.
