= Janne Ferm =

Finnish rally co-driver (born 1980)

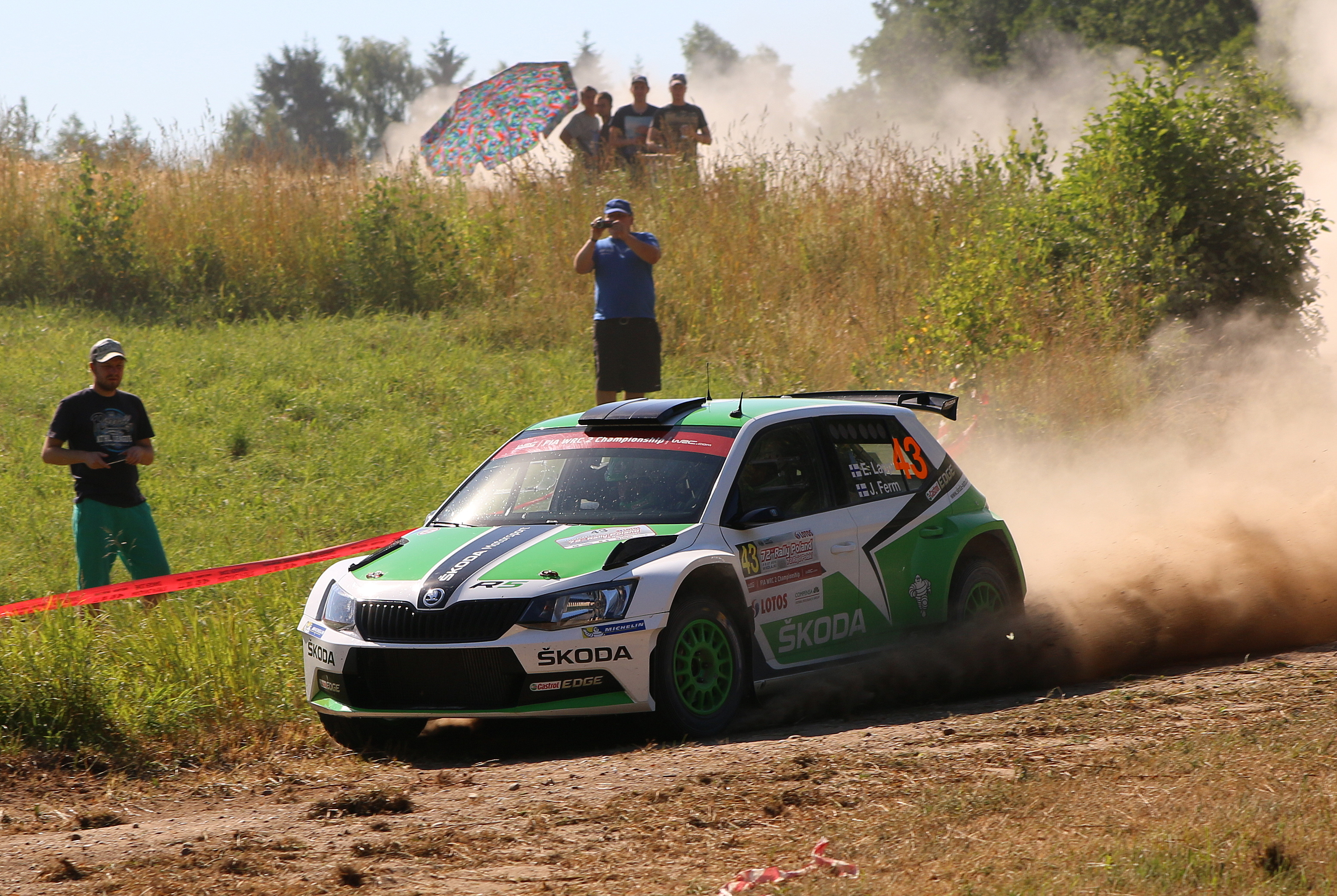
- Esapekka Lappi, OS 10 Mazury, 72nd LOTOS Rally Poland

Personal information
- Nationality: Finland
- Full name: Janne Kristian Ferm
- Born: 29 August 1980 (age 46); Lamminpää, Tampere

World Rally Championship record
- Years active: 2011–2013, 2015–2024
- Driver: (Finland) Esapekka Lappi
- Teams: Škoda, Toyota, Citroën, Ford, Hyundai
- Rallies: 90
- Championships: 0
- Rally wins: 2
- Podiums: 15
- Stage wins: 77
- First rally: 2011 Rally Finland
- First win: 2017 Rally Finland
- Last win: 2024 Rally Sweden
- Last rally: 2024 Rally Chile

Janne Kristian Ferm (born 29 August 1980) is a Finnish rally co-driver. He is best known for his long-time partnership with Esapekka Lappi.

== Rally career ==
A former footballer, Ferm first started co-driving in Lånsirannikko Rally in 2005 and later began his rally career in 2009, co-driving for several drivers before forming a partnership with Esapekka Lappi in the next year. In the 2011 Rally Finland, he made his WRC debut, where the crew drove in a Citroën C2 R2 Max.

In 2012, Ferm and Lappi won the 2012 Finnish Rally Championship, winning all seven rounds. In 2013, the Finnish crew was signed by Škoda Motorsport and competed selected events in WRC-2 in a Škoda Fabia S2000.

In 2016, the crew won the WRC-2 championship with the Škoda Fabia R5 after winning in Finland, Germany, Wales and Australia.

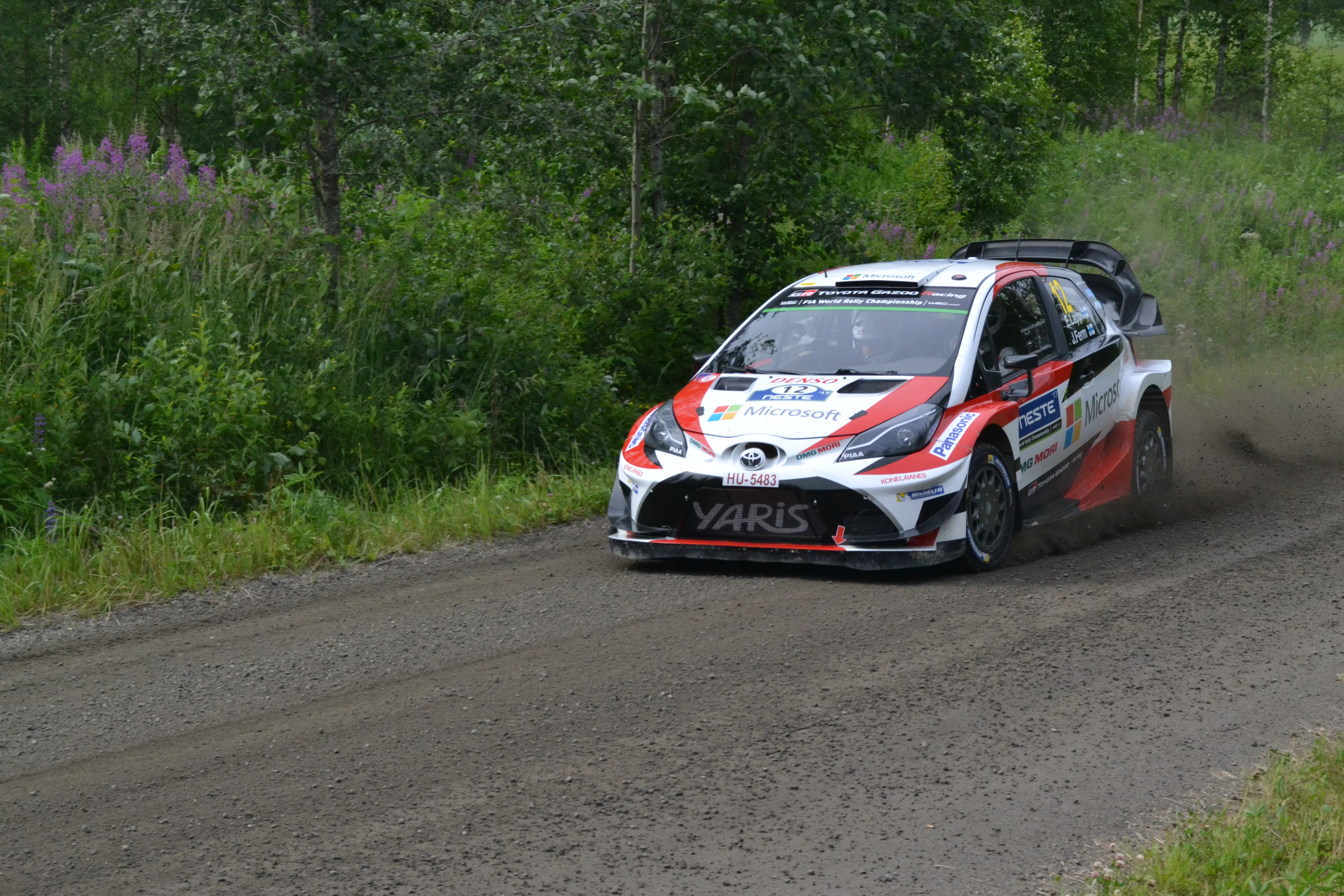
Lappi and Ferm during 2017 Rally Finland, where they achieved their first WRC victory.

Lappi and Ferm were signed by Toyota Gazoo Racing to drive a Toyota Yaris WRC in the 2017 World Rally Championship. On their second event with the team, the 2017 Rally Italia Sardegna, the crew won their first ever stage in the WRC, along with five more stage wins. They eventually finished fourth overall. In just their fourth World Rally Car start, at their home event of 2017 Rally Finland, the crew took their first WRC victory.

In October 2018, Toyota announced that both Lappi and Ferm would leave the team at the end of the 2018 championship. They joined Citroën for the 2019 season, partnering with multiple champion Sébastien Ogier.

Heading into the 2020 World Rally Championship season with the departure of Citroën World Rally Team from the top flight of the WRC Lappi and Ferm found themselves moving again, this time to M-Sport World Rally Team. The crew only lasted at Ford until the end of the 2021 World Rally Championship season, as in 2022, they partnered at Toyota again.

In 2023, Lappi and Ferm switched to Hyundai Shell Mobis World Rally Team. The pair remained with Hyundai on a part-time basis for the 2024 season during which they took their second WRC victory at Rally Sweden.At Rally Chile, Ferm announced his retirement from World Rally Championship. His last outing as a co-driver was for Heikki Kovalainen in San Marino's historic rally festival Rallylegend in October.

As of 2026, Ferm works as a commentator for MTV Urheilu.

== Victories ==
=== WRC victories ===
#	Event	Season	Driver	Car
1	67th Rally Finland	2017	(Finland) Esapekka Lappi	Toyota Yaris WRC
2	71st Rally Sweden	2024	(Finland) Esapekka Lappi	Hyundai i20 N Rally1

== Career results ==
=== WRC results ===
Year	Entrant	Car	1	2	3	4	5	6	7	8	9	10	11	12	13	14	Pos.	Points
2011	Printsport	Citroën C2 R2	SWE	MEX	POR	JOR	ITA	ARG	GRE	FIN; 32	GER	AUS	FRA	ESP	GBR		NC	0
2012	Printsport	Ford Fiesta S2000	MON	SWE	MEX	POR	ARG	GRE	NZL	FIN; 25							NC	0
2012	Esapekka Lappi	Citroën C2 R2									GER; Ret	GBR	FRA	ITA	ESP		NC	0
2013	Škoda Motorsport	Škoda Fabia S2000	MON; Ret	SWE	MEX	POR; 10	ARG	GRE	ITA								30th	1
2013	Esapekka Lappi	Škoda Fabia S2000								FIN; 31	GER	AUS	FRA	ESP	GBR		30th	1
2015	Škoda Motorsport	Škoda Fabia R5	MON	SWE	MEX	ARG	POR; 12	ITA; 17	POL; 12	FIN; 8	GER; 42	AUS	FRA; 14	ESP; Ret	GBR		20th	4
2016	Esapekka Lappi	Škoda Fabia R5	MON; 9														12th	16
2016	Škoda Motorsport	Škoda Fabia R5		SWE; 12	MEX	ARG	POR	ITA; 21	POL; 14	FIN; 8	GER; 7	CHN; C	FRA	ESP	GBR; 11	AUS; 8	12th	16
2017	Toyota Gazoo Racing WRT	Toyota Yaris WRC	MON	SWE	MEX	FRA	ARG	POR; 10	ITA; 4	POL; Ret	FIN; 1	GER; 21	ESP; Ret	GBR; 9	AUS; 6		11th	62
2018	Toyota Gazoo Racing WRT	Toyota Yaris WRC	MON; 7	SWE; 4	MEX; 11	FRA; 6	ARG; 8	POR; 5	ITA; 3	FIN; Ret	GER; 3	TUR; Ret	GBR; 3	ESP; 7	AUS; 4		5th	126
2019	Citroën Total WRT	Citroën C3 WRC	MON; Ret	SWE; 2	MEX; 13	FRA; 7	ARG; Ret	CHL; 6	POR; Ret	ITA; 7	FIN; 2	GER; 8	TUR; 2	GBR; 27	ESP; Ret	AUS; C	9th	83
2020	M-Sport Ford WRT	Ford Fiesta WRC	MON; 4	SWE; 5	MEX; Ret	EST; 7	TUR; 6	ITA; Ret	MNZ; 4								6th	52
2021	Movisport	Volkswagen Polo GTI R5	MON	ARC; 10	CRO	POR; 7	ITA	KEN	EST	BEL	GRE						12th	22
2021	RTE-Motorsport	Toyota Yaris WRC										FIN; 4	ESP	MNZ			12th	22
2022	Toyota Gazoo Racing WRT	Toyota GR Yaris Rally1	MON	SWE; 3	CRO; 49	POR	ITA; 44	KEN	EST; 6	FIN; 3	BEL; 3	GRE; 22	NZL	ESP	JPN		9th	58
2023	Hyundai Shell Mobis WRT	Hyundai i20 N Rally1	MON; 8	SWE; 7	MEX; Ret	CRO; 3	POR; 3	ITA; 2	KEN; 12	EST; 3	FIN; Ret	GRE; 5	CHL; Ret	EUR; Ret	JPN; 4		6th	113
2024	Hyundai Shell Mobis WRT	Hyundai i20 N Rally1	MON	SWE; 1	KEN; 12	CRO	POR	ITA	POL	LAT; Ret	FIN; 43	GRE	CHL; Ret	EUR	JPN		12th	33

=== SWRC results ===
Year	Entrant	Car	1	2	3	4	5	6	7	8	Pos.	Points
2012	Printsport	Ford Fiesta S2000	MON	SWE	POR	NZL	FIN; 5	GBR	FRA	ESP	12th	10

=== WRC-2 results ===
Year	Entrant	Car	1	2	3	4	5	6	7	8	9	10	11	12	13	14	Pos.	Points
2013	Škoda Motorsport	Škoda Fabia S2000	MON; Ret	SWE	MEX	POR; 1	ARG	GRE	ITA								16th	25
2013	Esapekka Lappi	Škoda Fabia S2000								FIN; 11	GER	AUS	FRA	ESP	GBR		16th	25
2015	Škoda Motorsport	Škoda Fabia R5	MON	SWE	MEX	ARG	POR; 2	ITA; 9	POL; 1	FIN; 1	GER; 13	AUS	FRA; 2	ESP; Ret	GBR		3rd	88
2016	Škoda Motorsport	Škoda Fabia R5	MON	SWE; 3	MEX	ARG	POR	ITA; 9	POL; 3	FIN; 1	GER; 1	CHN; C	FRA	ESP	GBR; 1	AUS; 1	1st	132
2021	Movisport	Volkswagen Polo GTI R5	MON	ARC; 1	CRO	POR; 1	ITA	KEN	EST	BEL	GRE	FIN	ESP	MNZ			7th	59

=== ERC results ===
Year	Entrant	Car	1	2	3	4	5	6	7	8	9	10	11	12	Pos.	Points
2012	Škoda Motorsport	Škoda Fabia S2000	AUT	ITA	CRO	BUL	BEL	TUR	POR	CZE	ESP	POL; 1	SUI		—	39
2013	Škoda Motorsport	Škoda Fabia S2000	JÄN	LIE	CAN	AZO	COR	YPR	ROM	ZLÍ; Ret	POL	CRO	SAN; 2	VAL; 1	5th	64
2014	Škoda Motorsport	Škoda Fabia S2000	JÄN	LIE; 1	ACR; 4	IRE; 1	AZO	YPR; Ret	EST; 5	CZE; Ret	CYP	VAL; 1	COR; Ret		1st	162

=== APRC results ===
Year	Entrant	Car	1	2	3	4	5	6	Pos.	Points
2013	Team MRF	Škoda Fabia S2000	NZL; 1	NCL; Ret	AUS; 1	MYS; Ret	JPN; Ret	CHN; 1	2nd	117
