= 2014 Tour de Corse =

2014 Tour de Corse: 31. Internationale Jänner Rallye 2014
Round 11 of 11 of the 2014 European Rally Championship
← Previous event	Next event →
- Host country: France
- Rally base: Ajaccio
- Dates run: 7 – 9 November 2014
- Stages: 11
- Stage surface: Asphalt

Statistics
- Crews: 50 at start, 36 at finish

Overall results
- Overall winner: (France) Stéphane Sarrazin; First Motorsport

The 2014 Tour de Corse was the 11th and final round of the 2014 European Rally Championship season, held on the island of Corsica from 7–9 November 2014.

== Report ==
The title fight was meant to go down to the wire between Škoda teammates Esapekka Lappi and Sepp Wiegand. A fire following a crash during testing made Lappi champion by default.

Lappi, was pleased to have been crowned the newest European Rally Champion before the event had started, and hoped to add to his tally of wins. This did not come to fruition, with the Finn crashing out of Stage 6, ending his participation in the rally.

Ex-Formula 1 driver Stéphane Sarrazin led the majority of the rally, having won most of the stages to take a dominating win, ahead of his compatriot Bryan Bouffier. It was the second time that year that a Formula One driver had won in ERC, as Robert Kubica had won the season-opening Internationale Jänner Rallye.

Vitaliy Pushkar was crowned ERC Production Cup champion after the withdrawal of his nearest rivals Keith Cronin and Martin Hudec. Andrea Crugnola won the Junior class but this was not enough to stop Stéphane Lefebvre from clinching the title, while Zoltán Bessenyey retained the 2WD title. Eric Camilli also received the McRae Flat Out Award for the first time.

== Results ==
Pos	No	Driver	Co-driver	Entrant	Car	Time/Retired	Points
1	10	(France) Stéphane Sarrazin	(France) Jacques-Julien Renucci	First Motorsport	Ford Fiesta RRC	2:36:48.4	39
2	2	(France) Bryan Bouffier	(France) Xavier Panseri	M-Sport Ltd.	Ford Fiesta RRC	2:37:07.3	30
3	7	(Netherlands) Kevin Abbring	(United Kingdom) Sebastian Marshall	Peugeot Rally Academy	Peugeot 208 T16	2:38:26.6	25
4	19	(France) Eric Camilli	(France) Benjamin Veillas	BP Team	Peugeot 208 T16	2:39:12.5	20
5	14	(France) Romain Dumas	(France) Denis Giraudet	RD Rallye Team	Porsche 997 GT3 RS 4.0 RGT	2:42:30.3	14
6	9	(Portugal) Bruno Magalhães	(Portugal) Carlos Magalhães	Delta Rally	Peugeot 208 T16	2:43:18.3	10
7	18	(France) Jean-Matthieu Leandri	(France) Fabrice Gordon	First Motorsport	Ford Fiesta R5	2:44:21.9	9
8	12	(Czech Republic) Jaromír Tarabus	(Czech Republic) Daniel Trunkát	Czech National Team	Škoda Fabia S2000	2:44:39.7	4
9	39	(France) Pierre-Antoine Guglielmi	(France) Jean Noël Vesperini	Renault Sport Technologies	Renault Clio R3	2:47:07.4	2
10	38	(Switzerland) Laurent Reuche	(Switzerland) Jean Deriaz	Renault Sport Technologies	Renault Clio RS R3T	2:50:09.4	1
Did not finish
SS10	11	(France) Julien Maurin	(France) Nicolas Klinger	Team 2B Yacco	Ford Fiesta R5	Mechanical	3
SS5	1	(Republic of Ireland) Craig Breen	(United Kingdom) Scott Martin	Peugeot Rally Academy	Peugeot 208 T16	Transmission	
SS6	4	(Finland) Esapekka Lappi	(Finland) Janne Ferm	Škoda Motorsport	Škoda Fabia S2000	Accident	
