= Vitaliy Pushkar =

Ukrainian rally driver

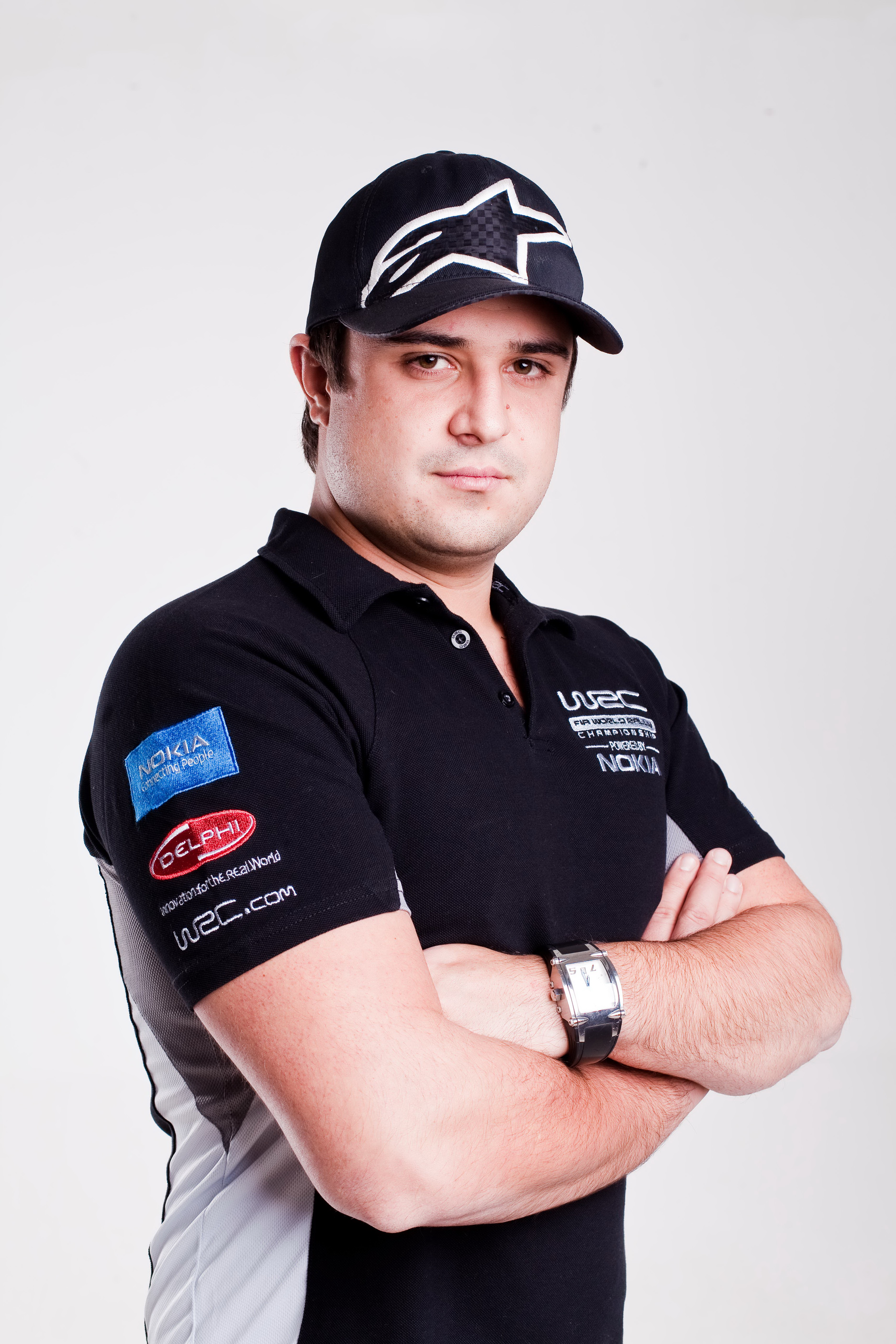
- Nationality: Ukrainian
- Born: May 9, 1987 (age 39) Kishineu

European Rally Championship career
- Debut season: 2013
- Current team: The Boar ProRacing
- Co-driver: Ivan Mishyn
- Starts: 14
- Championships: 0 (ERC Production – 1)
- Wins: 0 (ERC Production – 1)
- Best finish: 37 (ERC Production – 1) in 2014

Previous series
- 2011–2012: Intercontinental Rally Challenge
- Statistics up to date as of 2014.11.23.

Vitaliy Pushkar (Ukrainian: Пушкар Віталій Олексійович; born May 9, 1987) is a Ukrainian rally driver, Ukrainian rally vice-champion, European rally champion in ERC Production Cup category, and The Boar ProRacing team driver.

== Career ==
=== Ukrainian Rally Championship ===
Pushkar was born in Kishineu, Moldavian Soviet Socialist Republic – in present-day Moldova – and began competing at the beginning of 2009 with his childhood friend Ivan Mishyn as a co-driver. Their first car was the all-wheel-drive two-liter turbo Subaru Impreza earlier belonging to Igor Chapovskyi.

During that year, Pushkar started 11 times in different rallying competitions – and only not finishing once, at the Bukovina rally, due to technical problems.

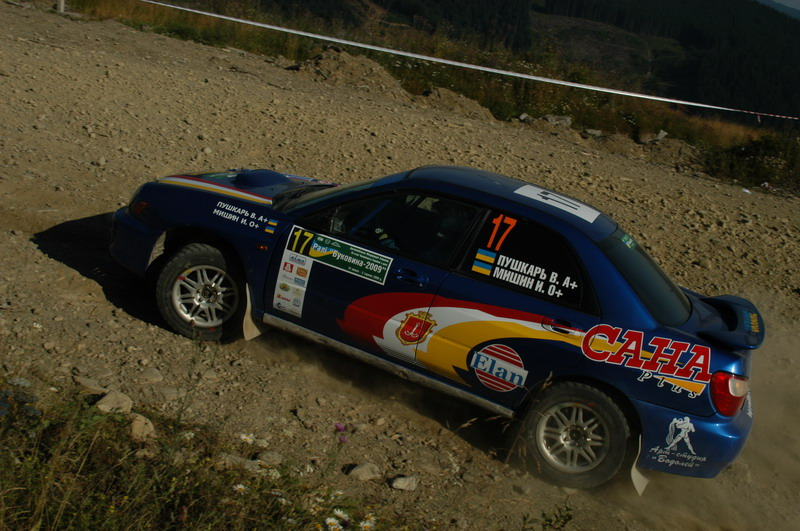
Vitaliy Pushkar and Ivan Mishyn on rally Bukovina, Chernivtsi, 2009

Pushkar changed car to a Mitsubishi Lancer Evo IX and employed Ukrainian rally champion Oleksandr Saliuk, Jr. as a coach. In May 2010, Pushkar won his first race, the Shapovalov Rally Cup, and finished inside the top ten fastest Ukrainian drivers at the end of the season.

During the two next seasons, Pushkar was among the leaders of the Ukrainian rally championship, finishing the several rallies on the podium. In 2011, he reached the top-five of the Ukrainian Rally Championship overall standings for the first time, and became the first and only winner of the Cup of Friendship, organized by the Ukrainian, Russian and Belarusian Automobile Federations.

The 2013 season was the most successful for Pushkar, now involved in the Ukrainian rally title battle. Winning the Chumatskyi Shlyakh Rally and placing third in the Mariupol Rally made him one of the season favorites. An accident during the Galicia Rally weakened his standings. The overall title was decided at the Ivano-Frankivsk Trembita Rally, but although Pushkar won that race, he did not take the title, coming second to his fellow Odessa Rally Team driver Youriy Kochmar.

=== Intercontinental Rally Challenge ===
After 2010, Pushkar increased his number of international starts. He participated in the Latvian and Estonian championships, and in 2012 he took part in the Intercontinental Rally Challenge. He won his first international race, the Romanian Rally Sibiu and finished the season in sixth place in IRC Production. He began to work closely with the Lithuanian ProRacing Team.

=== European Rally Championship ===
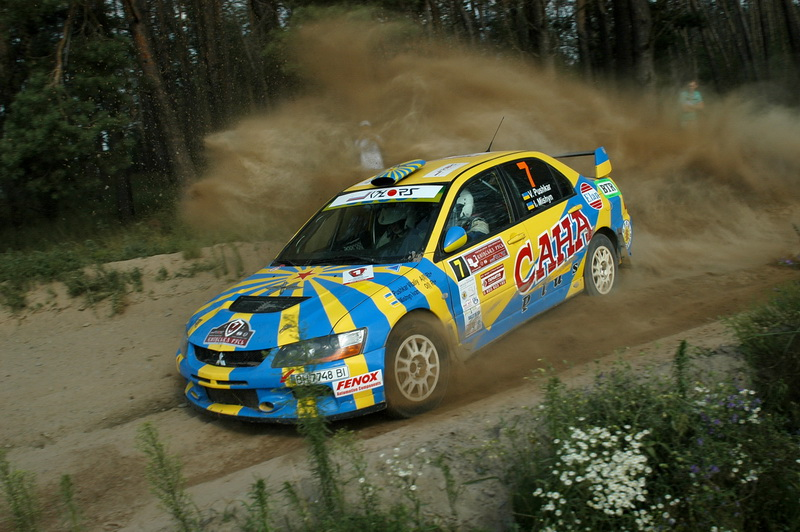
Vitaliy Pushkar and Ivan Mishyn on rally Kyivska Rus, Kyiv, 2011

In 2013, Pushkar participated in European Rally Championship for the first time, which had been amalgamated with the IRC in late 2012. He placed fifth in the Production Cup at the 2013 Rally Liepāja-Ventspils; but after the several accidents and technical retirements, he stopped the participating in ERC that year.

Pushkar returned to the ERC in 2014. He started the season with an accident at the Jänner Rally, but finished second at the Rally Liepāja–Ventspils and won the Acropolis Rally.

At the end of the season, Pushkar safely finished at the Rallye du Valais and Tour de Corse, and after scoring 167 points became the European Rally Champion among the Production Car drivers.

== International results ==
=== IRC ===
Year	Participant	Car	1	2	3	4	5	6	7	8	9	10	11	12	13	Pos.	Points
2012	Odessa Rally Team	Mitsubishi Lancer Evo IX	POR	ESP	IRL	FRA	ITA; 23	BEL; 31	SMR	ROU; 4	CZE	UKR; Ret	BGR	ITA; 25	CYP; 20	33rd	12

=== ERC ===
Year	Participant	Car	1	2	3	4	5	6	7	8	9	10	11	12	Pos.	Points
2013	The Boar ProRacing	Mitsubishi Lancer Evo X	AUT	LAT; 12	ESP	POR; Ret	FRA	BEL; Ret	ROU; Ret	CZE	POL	CRO	ITA	ITA	81st	1
2014	The Boar ProRacing	Mitsubishi Lancer Evo X	AUT; Ret	LAT; 8	ROU	GRC; 13	IRL	POR; Ret	BEL; 16	EST; 13	CZE; Ret	CYP; 9	ITA; 16	FRA; 17	37th	14

=== ERC Production Cup ===
Year	Participant	Car	1	2	3	4	5	6	7	8	9	10	11	12	Pos.	Points
2013	The Boar ProRacing	Mitsubishi Lancer Evo X	AUT	LAT; 5	ESP	POR; Ret	FRA	BEL; Ret	ROU; Ret	CZE	POL	CRO	ITA	ITA	24th	25
2014	The Boar ProRacing	Mitsubishi Lancer Evo X	AUT; Ret	LAT; 2	ROU	GRC; 1	IRL	POR; Ret	BEL; 6	EST; 5	CZE; Ret	CYP; 4	ITA; 3	FRA; 2	1st	167

== Interesting facts and figures ==
Pushkar is the first driver from the former Soviet Union who has won the title of European Rally Champion.

From 2009 until 2014, Pushkar entered 77 rallies, attaining 19th position in the Ukrainian Club 50 (drivers who have started in 50 or more rallies).

Pushkar only once started a driver other than Mishyn: on 2010 Shapovalov Rally Cup Oleksandr Saliuk Jr. took Mishyn's place. Interesting, that it happened exactly on Pushkar's birthday, May 9.

The joint Pushkar/Mishyn crew has 76 starts, second only amongst Ukrainian crews to Gorban/Leonov, with 88 joint starts.

== Titles and awards ==
Awards and achievements
Preceded by Youriy Kochmar	Ukrainian Rally Awards 'Progress of the Year' Winner; 2012	Succeeded by Dmytro Radzivil
Sporting positions
Preceded by Andreas Aigner	ERC Production Car Cup Winner; 2014	Succeeded by Not conducted
Preceded by Not conducted	Cup of Friendship Winner; 2011	Succeeded by Not conducted
