= 2013 Rally Liepāja =

International rally competition held in Latvia

Rally Liepāja-Ventspils 2013
Round 2 of the 2013 European Rally Championship season
← Previous event	Next event →
- Host country: (Latvia)
- Rally base: Liepāja/Ventspils
- Dates run: 1 – 3 February 2013
- Stages: 15 (243 km; 151 miles)
- Stage surface: Snow and Gravel

Statistics
- Crews: 37 (ERC only) at start, 30 (ERC only) at finish

The 2013 Rally Liepāja-Ventspils was the second round of the 2013 European Rally Championship. The stages were mainly gravel with snowy and icy parts. Jari Ketomaa won the event after a huge fight with runner-up Craig Breen. François Delecour rounded off the podium places. The 2WD Cup was won by Risto Immonen, while the Production Cup honors went to Švedas Vytautas.

== Results ==
Pos.	Driver	Co-driver	Car	Time	Difference	Points
1	(Finland) Jari Ketomaa	(Finland) Kaj Lindström	(United Kingdom) Ford Fiesta RRC	2:08:15.7		25+14
2	(Republic of Ireland) Craig Breen	(Republic of Ireland) David Moynihan	(France) Peugeot 207 S2000	2:08:46.7	+31.0	18+12
3	(France) François Delecour	(France) Dominique Savignoni	(France) Peugeot 207 S2000	2:11:03.2	+2:47.5	15+8
4	(Czech Republic) Jan Černý	(Czech Republic) Pavel Kohout	(Czech Republic) Škoda Fabia S2000	2:11:19.1	+3:03.4	12+8
5	(Latvia) Raimonds Kisiels	(Latvia) Ronis Arnis	(United Kingdom) Mini John Cooper Works S2000	2:14:02.0	+5:46.3	10+2
6	(Lithuania) Vytautas Švedas	(Lithuania) Žilvinas Sakalauskas	(Japan) Mitsubishi Lancer Evo X	2:14:11.4	+5:55.7	8+3
7	(Latvia) Aivis Egle	(Latvia) Andis Dauga	(Japan) Mitsubishi Lancer Evo X	2:15:55.2	+7:39.5	6
8	(Estonia) Raul Jeets	(Estonia) Andrus Toom	(Japan) Mitsubishi Lancer Evo X	2:16:53.3	+8:37.6	4
9	(Czech Republic) Jaroslav Orsák	(Czech Republic) David Šmeidler	(Japan) Mitsubishi Lancer Evo IX	2:17:04.6	+8:48.9	2
10	(Ukraine) Vitaliy Pushkar	(Ukraine) Ivan Mishyn	(Japan) Mitsubishi Lancer Evo X R4	2:17:40.7	+9:25.0	1

=== Special stages ===
Day	Stage	Time	Name	Length	Winner	Time	Avg. spd.	Rally leader
Leg 1 (1 February)	SS1	17:10	Rallyofchampions.com (Podnieki)	6.16 km	(Republic of Ireland) Craig Breen	3:16.6	112.80 km/h	(Republic of Ireland) Craig Breen
Leg 1 (1 February)	SS2	17:45	Volkswagen 1	16.88 km	(Republic of Ireland) Craig Breen	9:14.2	109.65 km/h	(Republic of Ireland) Craig Breen
Leg 1 (1 February)	SS3	18:45	LDz Cargo 1	18.68 km	(Republic of Ireland) Craig Breen	9:44.6	115.03 km/h	(Republic of Ireland) Craig Breen
Leg 2 (2 February)	SS4	10:20	LDz Cargo 2	18.68 km	(Republic of Ireland) Craig Breen	9:17.6	120.60 km/h	(Republic of Ireland) Craig Breen
Leg 2 (2 February)	SS5	10:55	Volkswagen 2	16.88 km	(Republic of Ireland) Craig Breen	8:56.2	113.33 km/h	(Republic of Ireland) Craig Breen
Leg 2 (2 February)	SS6	11:55	Neste Oil 1	21.31 km	(Finland) Jari Ketomaa	10:49.7	118.08 km/h	(Finland) Jari Ketomaa
Leg 2 (2 February)	SS7	15:20	Ventbunkers 1	10.42 km	(Finland) Jari Ketomaa	4:58.1	125.84 km/h	(Finland) Jari Ketomaa
Leg 2 (2 February)	SS8	15:55	Neste Oil 2	21.31 km	(Finland) Jari Ketomaa	10:29.0	121.97 km/h	(Finland) Jari Ketomaa
Leg 2 (2 February)	SS9	17:20	Ventspils Kalns 1	3.40 km	(Finland) Jari Ketomaa	2:23.2	85.47 km/h	(Finland) Jari Ketomaa
Leg 3 (3 February)	SS10	8:30	Ventbunkers 2	7.00 km	(Finland) Jari Ketomaa	4:53.7	85.80 km/h	(Finland) Jari Ketomaa
Leg 3 (3 February)	SS11	9:00	Swecon 1	21.34 km	(Finland) Jari Ketomaa	11:49.7	108.25 km/h	(Finland) Jari Ketomaa
Leg 3 (3 February)	SS12	10:10	Kuldīga 1	26.34 km	(Finland) Jari Ketomaa	14:11.4	111.37 km/h	(Finland) Jari Ketomaa
Leg 3 (3 February)	SS13	12:05	Swecon 2	21.34 km	(Republic of Ireland) Craig Breen	11:36.8	110.25 km/h	(Finland) Jari Ketomaa
Leg 3 (3 February)	SS14	13:15	Kuldīga 2	26.34 km	(Finland) Jari Ketomaa	13:58.6	113.07 km/h	(Finland) Jari Ketomaa
Leg 3 (3 February)	SS15	15:00	Ventspils Kalns 2	3.40 km	(Czech Republic) Jan Černý	2:21.6	86.44 km/h	(Finland) Jari Ketomaa
