= Gareth Roberts (co-driver) =

British rally co-driver (1987–2012)

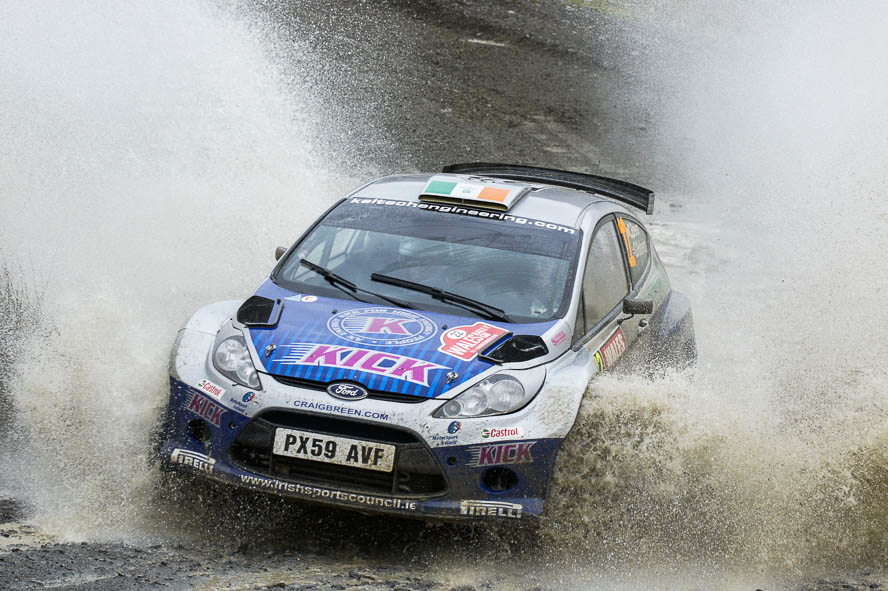

Personal information
- Nationality: (United Kingdom) British
- Born: 6 August 1987
- Died: 16 June 2012 (aged 24)

Gareth "Jaffa" Roberts (6 August 1987 – 16 June 2012) was a rally co-driver from Carmarthen in Wales, who was killed in an accident while competing in the Targa Florio Rally in Sicily while sitting alongside Irish driver Craig Breen. The crash happened during the eighth stage of the rally when their Peugeot 207 went off the road about five miles from the start of the Cefalu leg. A guard rail entered the car on the right side, where Welshman Roberts, 24, was seated.

At his funeral, former co-driver, Welsh TV broadcaster and friend Howard Davies eulogised: "There is no doubt in my mind that Jaffa would have become a World Champion co-driver. He had all the qualities required and more. His personality warmed rooms and his massive beaming smile turned negative situations into positive ones. Once strapped into the car he was the ultimate robotic co-driver with an ability to adapt to any situation and speed."
