= 2014 Rally Liepāja =

Rally competition held in Latvia

2014 Rally Liepāja–Ventspils
Round 2 of 12 of the 2014 European Rally Championship
← Previous event	Next event →
- Host country: Latvia
- Rally base: (Latvia) Liepāja
- Dates run: 31 January – 2 February 2014
- Stages: 12
- Stage surface: Gravel/Snow

Statistics
- Crews: 49 at start, 34 at finish

Overall results
- Overall winner: (Finland) Esapekka Lappi; Škoda Motorsport

The Rally Liepāja–Ventspils was the second round of the 2014 European Rally Championship season, held in Latvia between 31 January and 2 February 2014.

The rally was won by Esapekka Lappi and co-driver Janne Ferm.

== Results ==
Pos	No	Driver	Co-driver	Entrant	Car	Time/Retired	Points
1	3	(Finland) Esapekka Lappi	(Finland) Janne Ferm	Škoda Motorsport	Škoda Fabia S2000	2:13:11.5	39
2	4	(Russia) Vasiliy Gryazin	(Russia) Dmitry Eremeev	Sports Racing Technologies	Ford Fiesta S2000	2:13:46.2	30
3	1	(Republic of Ireland) Craig Breen	(United Kingdom) Scott Martin	Peugeot Rally Academy	Peugeot 207 S2000	2:14:48.3	25
4	5	(Poland) Kajetan Kajetanowicz	(Poland) Jaroslaw Baran	Lotos Rally Team	Ford Fiesta R5	2:15:47.0	19
5	7	(Germany) Sepp Wiegand	(Germany) Frank Christian	Škoda Auto Deutschland	Škoda Fabia S2000	2:16:27.6	17
6	10	(Latvia) Jãnis Vorobjovs	(Latvia) Andris MÃlnieks		Mitsubishi Lancer Evo X	2:18:54.1	10
7	26	(Ukraine) Vitaliy Pushkar	(Ukraine) Ivan Mishyn	The Boar ProRacing	Mitsubishi Lancer Evo X R4	2:20:02.3	6
8	23	(Russia) Stanislav Travnikov	(Russia) Alexey Bashmakov	Prospeed	Mitsubishi Lancer Evo X R4	2:20:27.4	5
9	24	(Lithuania) Martynas Samuitis	(Lithuania) Sau Cikovas Ramunas	Wellman Rally Team	Peugeot 208 R2	2:20:34.7	3
10	33	(Czech Republic) Jan Černý	(Czech Republic) Pavel Kohout	Jipocar Czech National Team	Peugeot 208 R2	2:10:48.7	1
Did not finish
SS2	2	(France) Bryan Bouffier	(France) Xavier Panseri		Citroën DS3 S2000	Mechanical	
SS9	8	(Czech Republic) Jaromír Tarabus	(Czech Republic) Daniel Trunkát	Jipocar Czech National Team	Škoda Fabia S2000	Accident	
SS11	12	(Czech Republic) Jaroslav Orsák	(Czech Republic) David Smeidler		Škoda Fabia S2000	Mechanical	
SS6	18	(France) Jean Michel Rauox	(France) Laurent Magat		Peugeot 207 S2000	Mechanical	
SS8	20	(Estonia) Siim Plangi	(Estonia) Marek Sarapuu		Mitsubishi Lancer Evo X	Overtime	2
SS8	21	(Latvia) Mãrtins Svilis	(Latvia) Ivo Pukis	SKN Sports	Mitsubishi Lancer Evo IX	Accident	1
