= Craig Breen =

Irish rally driver (1990–2023)

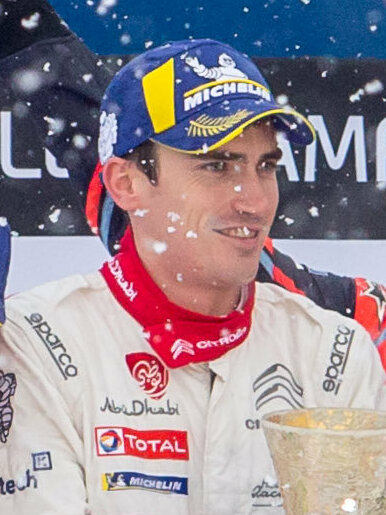
- Breen at the 2018 Rally Sweden

Personal information
- Nationality: (Republic of Ireland) Irish
- Born: 2 February 1990; Waterford, Ireland
- Died: 13 April 2023 (aged 33); Lobor, Croatia

World Rally Championship record
- Years active: 2009–2012, 2014–2023
- Co-driver: (United Kingdom) Gareth Roberts (Republic of Ireland) Paul Nagle (United Kingdom) Scott Martin (Republic of Ireland) James Fulton
- Teams: Peugeot Sport, Citroën, Hyundai, M-Sport Ford World Rally Team
- Rallies: 82
- Championships: 0
- Rally wins: 0
- Podiums: 9
- Stage wins: 35
- Total points: 405
- First rally: 2009 Rally de Portugal
- Last rally: 2023 Rally Sweden

Craig Breen (2 February 1990 – 13 April 2023) was an Irish rally driver who last competed part time for the Hyundai team in the World Rally Championship (WRC). He won the 2012 Super 2000 WRC, scoring class wins in the Monte Carlo Rally, Wales Rally GB, Rally France and the Rally of Spain. Breen won the WRC Academy Cup in 2011, winning his first event at the 2011 Rallye Deutschland and sealing the championship with a win at Wales Rally GB. The academy title going down to the last stage, with Breen and Estonian rally driver Egon Kaur ending the season, both on 111 points, Breen then won the title on count back of stage wins, 39 to 14. Breen won the 2021 Rentokil Historic Rally in Killarney, Kerry, Ireland in his BMW M3 E30.

Breen died on 13 April 2023 after a collision with a post during a pre-event test ahead of the 2023 Croatia Rally, which punctured the cabin of the Hyundai i20.

== Career ==
Craig was the son of Ray Breen, a national champion in Irish rallying. He began karting in 1999 in Ireland. He began rallying in 2007, combining it with karting commitments in Europe in 2008.

In 2009, Breen made the full-time switch to rallying, competing in the Irish, British and International Fiesta Sporting Trophies, winning all three championships. He also went on to win the Fiesta Sport Trophy International Shootout and was awarded a twelve-month contract with M-Sport. For his achievements Breen was crowned Young Irish Rally Driver of the Year and received the Billy Coleman Award.

In 2010, Breen debuted the Ford Fiesta S2000 in both British Rally Championship and the Irish Tarmac Rally Championship. He took his first BRC victory on the 2010 Ulster Rally and went on to finish second overall in the ITC. He also finished 17th overall in the car at the 2010 Rally Finland and 12th overall at Wales Rally GB.

In 2011, Breen competed in the WRC Academy driving a Ford Fiesta R2. He won his first WRC event at the Rallye Deutschland and his win at Wales Rally GB made him the inaugural WRC Academy Cup champion.

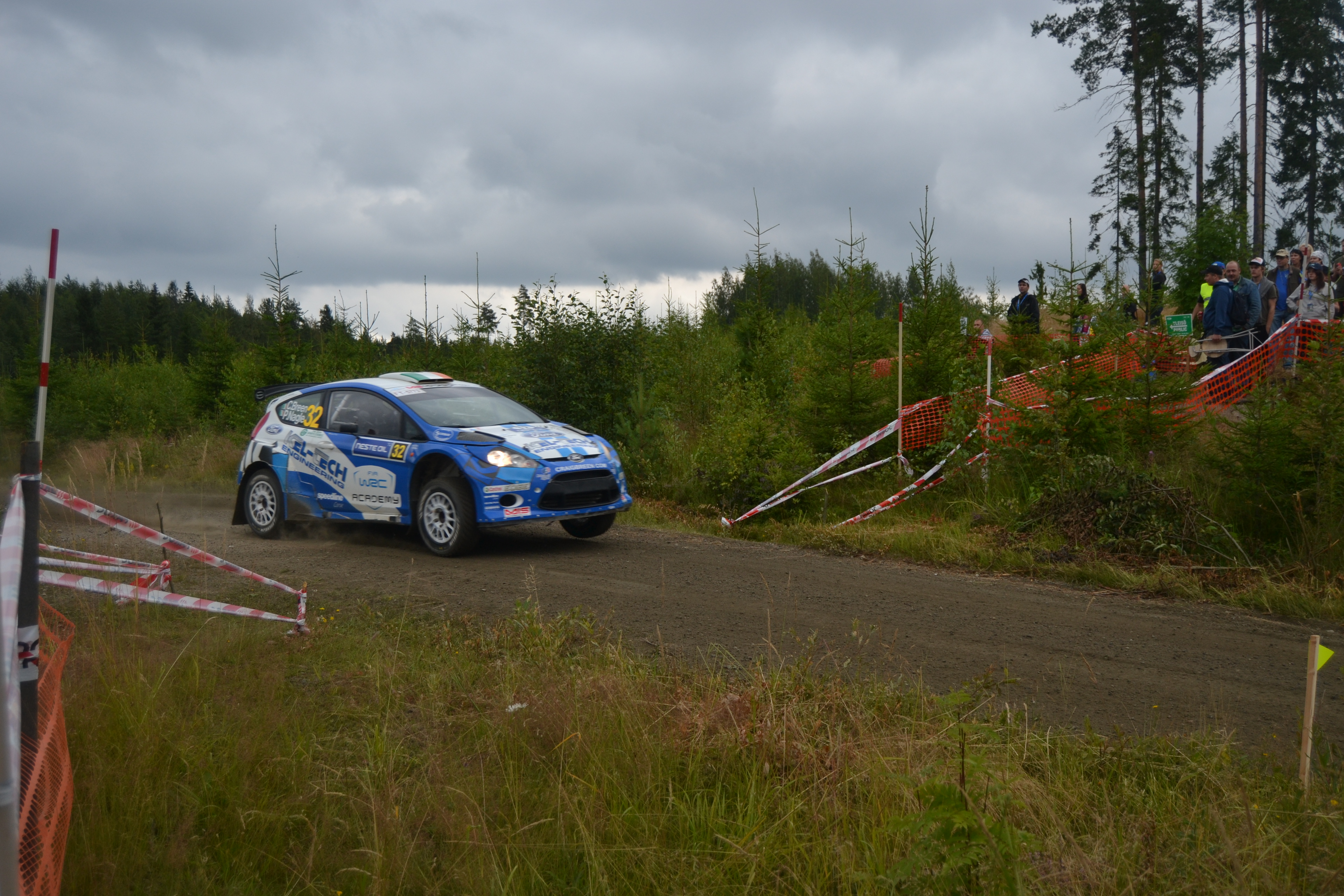
Breen at the 2012 Rally Finland.

For 2012, Breen progressed to the S-WRC championship driving a Ford Fiesta S2000. He won the opening round at Monte Carlo and led the championship after the second round in Sweden.

In June 2012, Breen's co-driver Gareth Roberts was killed in an accident during the Targa Florio Rally, the fifth round of the 2012 Intercontinental Rally Challenge.

In Rally de Catalunya, in November, Breen won the Super 2000 world championship. At the end of the rally, a very emotional Breen declared "I'm a kid, I can't believe I've done this."

In 2013, Breen and co-driver Paul Nagle were signed by Peugeot to lead their ERC campaign called 'Peugeot Rally Academy'. Breen was successful, achieving five podium places during the season, and eventually finishing third overall, missing out on the runner-up spot by only four points. Midway during the season Nagle left the team to help out Volkswagen's Andreas Mikkelsen in the WRC; from the Rajd Polski onwards, Belgian Lara Vanneste became Breen's co-driver.

Breen won his first ERC rally at the 2014 Acropolis Rally in Greece, driving a Peugeot 208 T16.

Breen and co-driver Scott Martin won the 2015 Circuit of Ireland Rally which had been a long-time ambition of Breen's especially as this would be the 20th anniversary of his Rally Idol's Tarmac Championship win, that being Frank Meagher.

Breen did a part-time campaign with the Citroën Total World Rally Team in 2016, achieving his maiden Special Stage win and an emotional first podium finish with third place at the 2016 Rally Finland. He improved the result in 2018 by finishing second at the 2018 Rally Sweden.

Breen joined Hyundai Shell Mobis WRT for two events in the 2019 WRC campaign, remaining with the team on a part-time campaign through to the end of the 2021 WRC season. In this period, he accomplished four podium finishes, including three second places.

In October 2021, it was announced that Breen would join M-Sport World Rally Team as their lead driver for the 2022 season. He joined Adrien Fourmaux and Gus Greensmith in competing at all 13 rounds, making it his first full-time WRC campaign.

Breen achieved two podium finishes with the Ford Puma Rally1, with a second place in Italy and a third place on debut in Monte Carlo. Before the 2022 Rally Catalunya, James Fulton became Breen's new co-driver after his long-time co-driver Paul Nagle announced his retirement.

Breen moved from M-Sport back to Hyundai Shell Mobis WRT for the 2023 World Rally Championship, again as a part-time driver for the Korean team. He started his campaign in Sweden with a second-place finish which saw him leading the rally for a considerable part of the event. Unfortunately, Breen was killed in a crash during a test before Rally Croatia.

== Death ==
Breen died on 13 April 2023, aged 33, after a crash driving his Hyundai i20 N Rally1 rally car in a testing session for the 2023 Croatia Rally. The front left of his car collided with a pole on a road between Stari Golubovec and Lobor at 12:40 pm local time, fatally injuring him. Breen's co-driver James Fulton was uninjured. Breen's funeral took place on 18 April 2023 at The Sacred Heart Church in Ferrybank. Several WRC associates attended the funeral, including Fulton, Breen's former co-driver, Paul Nagle and Breen's teammates at Hyundai, Thierry Neuville and Dani Sordo.

On 17 April 2023, the Fédération Internationale de l'Automobile announced Breen's car number 42 would be retired from the rest of the 2023 season.

== Career results ==
=== WRC results ===
Year	Entrant	Car	1	2	3	4	5	6	7	8	9	10	11	12	13	14	Pos.	Points
2009	Craig Breen	Ford Fiesta ST	IRE	NOR	CYP	POR; 25	ARG	ITA	GRE	POL	FIN; 26						NC	0
2009	Craig Breen	Ford Fiesta R2										AUS	ESP; 36	GBR; 39			NC	0
2010	Castrol Ford Team Türkiye	Ford Fiesta	SWE	MEX	JOR	TUR; 22	NZL	POR	BUL								NC	0
2010	Craig Breen	Ford Fiesta S2000								FIN; 19	GER	JPN	FRA	ESP			NC	0
2010	Barwa Rally Team	Ford Fiesta S2000														GBR; 12	NC	0
2011	Craig Breen	Ford Fiesta S2000	SWE; 15	MEX	POR	JOR	ITA	ARG	GRE	FIN	GER	AUS	FRA				NC	0
2011	PS Engineering	Ford Fiesta S2000												ESP; 15	GBR		NC	0
2012	Craig Breen	Ford Fiesta S2000	MON; 14	SWE; 16	MEX	POR; Ret	ARG	GRE	NZL	FIN; Ret	GER	GBR; 13	FRA; 17	ITA	ESP; 6		17th	8
2014	Craig Breen	Ford Fiesta RS WRC	MON	SWE; 9	MEX	POR	ARG	ITA	POL	FIN; Ret	GER	AUS	FRA	ESP	GBR		25th	2
2015	Saintéloc Junior Team	Peugeot 208 T16 R5	MON; 13	SWE	MEX	ARG	POR; Ret	ITA	POL	FIN; Ret	GER; 18	AUS	FRA; 17	ESP; Ret	GBR; 13		NC	0
2016	Abu Dhabi Total WRT	Citroën DS3 WRC	MON	SWE; 8	MEX	ARG	POR	ITA	POL; 7	FIN; 3	GER	CHN; C	FRA; 5	ESP; 10	GBR; Ret	AUS	10th	36
2017	Citroën Total Abu Dhabi WRT	Citroën DS3 WRC	MON; 5														10th	64
2017	Citroën Total Abu Dhabi WRT	Citroën C3 WRC		SWE; 5	MEX	FRA; 5	ARG; Ret	POR; 5	ITA; 25	POL; 11	FIN; 5	GER; 5	ESP	GBR; 15	AUS; Ret		10th	64
2018	Citroën Total Abu Dhabi WRT	Citroën C3 WRC	MON; 9	SWE; 2	MEX	FRA	ARG; Ret	POR; 7	ITA; 6	FIN; 8	GER; 7	TUR; Ret	GBR; 4	ESP; 9	AUS; 7		11th	67
2019	Hyundai Shell Mobis WRT	Hyundai i20 Coupe WRC	MON	SWE	MEX	FRA	ARG	CHL	POR	ITA	FIN; 7	GER	TUR	GBR; 8	ESP	AUS; C	14th	10
2020	Hyundai Shell Mobis WRT	Hyundai i20 Coupe WRC	MON	SWE; 7	MEX	EST; 2	TUR	ITA	MNZ								9th	25
2021	Hyundai Shell Mobis WRT	Hyundai i20 Coupe WRC	MON	ARC; 4	CRO; 8	POR	ITA	KEN	EST; 2	BEL; 2	GRE	FIN; 3	ESP	MNZ			8th	76
2022	M-Sport Ford WRT	Ford Puma Rally1	MON; 3	SWE; 36	CRO; 4	POR; 8	ITA; 2	KEN; 6	EST; 30	FIN; 32	BEL; 63	GRE; 5	NZL; 19	ESP; 9	JPN; 24		7th	84
2023	Hyundai Shell Mobis WRT	Hyundai i20 N Rally1	MON	SWE; 2	MEX	CRO	POR	ITA	KEN	EST	FIN	GRE	CHL	EUR	JPN		14th	19

=== SWRC results ===
Year	Entrant	Car	1	2	3	4	5	6	7	8	9	10	Pos.	Points
2010	Barwa Rally Team	Ford Fiesta S2000	SWE	MEX	JOR	NZL	POR	FIN	GER	JPN	FRA	GBR; 2	12th	18
2011	PS Engineering	Ford Fiesta S2000	MEX	JOR	ITA	GRE	FIN	GER	FRA	ESP; 4			10th	12
2012	Craig Breen	Ford Fiesta S2000	MON; 1	SWE; 2	POR; Ret	NZL	FIN; Ret	GBR; 1	FRA; 1	ESP; 1			1st	118

=== WRC Academy results ===
Year	Entrant	1	2	3	4	5	6	Pos.	Points
2011	Craig Breen	POR; Ret	ITA; 8	FIN; 2	GER; 1	FRA; Ret	GBR; 1	1st	111

=== WRC-2 results ===
Year	Entrant	Car	1	2	3	4	5	6	7	8	9	10	11	12	13	Pos.	Points
2015	Saintéloc Junior Team	Peugeot 208 T16 R5	MON; 2	SWE	MEX	POR; Ret	ARG	ITA	POL	FIN; Ret	GER; 5	AUS	FRA; 4	ESP; Ret	GBR; 3	9th	55

=== IRC results ===
Year	Entrant	Car	1	2	3	4	5	6	7	8	9	10	11	12	13	Pos.	Points
2011	Craig Breen	Ford Fiesta S2000	MON	CAN	COR	YAL	YPR	AZO	ZLI; 7	MEC	SAN	SCO; 4	CYP			12th	24
2012	Saintéloc Racing	Peugeot 207 S2000	AZO	CAN	IRL; 5	COR; 6	ITA; Ret	YPR	SMR	ROM	ZLI	YAL	SLI	SAN; 6	CYP	14th	26

=== ERC results ===
Year	Entrant	Car	1	2	3	4	5	6	7	8	9	10	11	12	Pos.	Points
2013	Sainteloc Peugeot Rally Academy	Peugeot 207 S2000	JÄN	LIE; 2	CAN; 2										3rd	145
2013	Peugeot Rally Academy	Peugeot 207 S2000				AZO; 2	COR; 4	YPR; 3	ROM	CZE	POL; 7	CRO	SAN; Ret	VAL; 3	3rd	145
2014	Peugeot Rally Academy	Peugeot 207 S2000	JÄN	LIE; 3											3rd	104
2014	Peugeot Rally Academy	Peugeot 208 T16 R5			GRE; 1	IRE; Ret	AZO; Ret	YPR; Ret	EST	CZE; Ret	CYP; Ret	ROM	VAL; 2	COR; Ret	3rd	104
2015	Peugeot Rally Academy	Peugeot 208 T16 R5	JÄN; Ret	LIE; 1	IRE; 1	AZO; 1	YPR; Ret	EST; Ret	CZE; 7	CYP	GRE; 2	VAL; 2			2nd	185
2016	DGM Sport	Citroën DS3 R5	CAN	IRE; 1	GRE	AZO	YPR	EST	POL	ZLI	LIE	CYP			8th	38
2020	Team MRF Tyres	Hyundai i20 R5	ITA; 4	LAT; 4	PRT; 16	HUN; Ret	ESP; 11								7th	49
2021	Team MRF Tyres	Hyundai i20 R5	POL; 42	LAT; 2	ITA; 9	CZE	PRT1	PRT2	HUN	ESP					10th	43
2023	Team Hyundai Portugal	Hyundai i20 N Rally2	PRT; 6	ESP	POL	LAT	SWE	ITA	CZE	HUN					25th	20
