= Jänner Rallye =

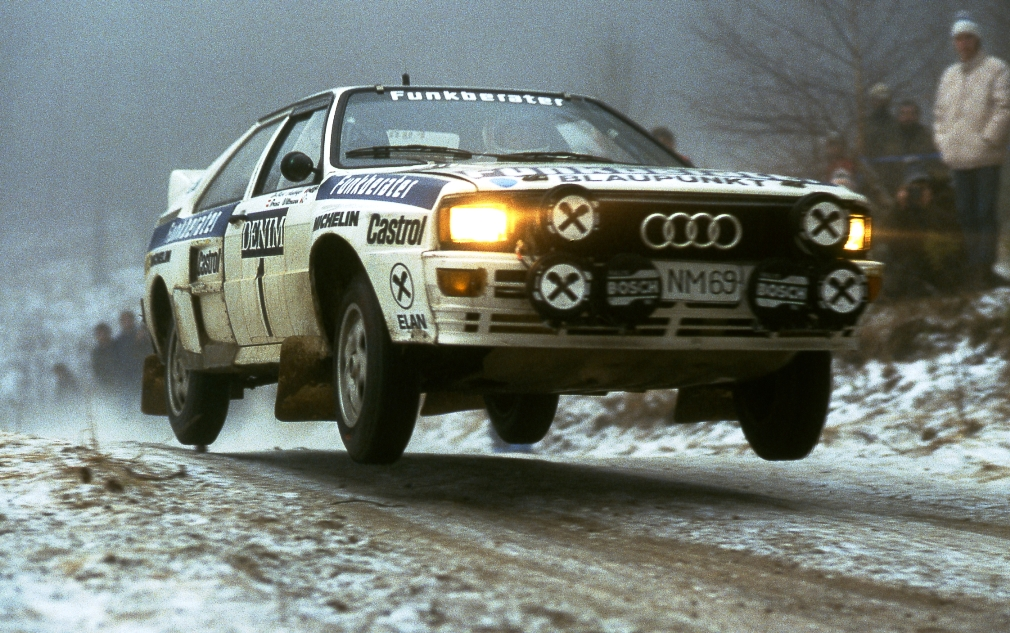
Franz Wittmann, Sr. at the 1984 event

The Jänner Rallye, also known as the Internationale Jänner Rallye, is an international rallying event based in Freistadt in northern Austria. The event is the season opening round of the European Rally Championship, the Austrian Rally Championship and the Czech Rally Championship. Translated from German the name means January Rally. The mid-winter calendar position means the rally is frequently snow-bound with the surface a mix of ice and asphalt.

== History ==
First run in 1969 as the Casino Rallye, it quickly became a feature of the Austrian championship and soon joined the European championship although only in the lower co-efficient category. Achim Warmbold became the first multiple winner of the event in 1973, but Franz Wittmann, Sr. came to dominate the rally. He won the rally nine times in a ten-year period from 1975 to 1984, including six straight wins in Audis as the 4WD era dawned.

The rally ended in 1986 because of environmental concerns. The rally returned in 2000 and in 2003 Wittman won the rally for a tenth time. In recent times honours have been shared between Austrian and Czech drivers, reflecting the dual national championship status the rally has acquired. Raimund Baumschlager, Václav Pech, Jr. and Jan Kopecký have claimed multiple victories.

In 2012, the rally rejoined the European Championship after having dropped out with the demise of the co-efficient system in 2004. The rally replaced the ELPA Rally in Greece which had been cancelled in 2011.

In 2016, the rally didn't take place since the Rallye Club Mühlviertel (responsible for the rally organization) was struggling with lack of candidates to assume the management board. The rally restarted in 2018 as a round of the Austrian Rally Championship.

== List of winners ==
Sourced in part from:

Year	Winner	Car
1969	(Austria) Heinz Weiner	Citroën DS 19
1970	(West Germany) Helmut Bein	BMW 2002
1971	(West Germany) Rudolf Müller	BMW 2002
1972	(West Germany) Achim Warmbold	Opel Ascona
1973	(West Germany) Achim Warmbold	Volkswagen 1302S
1974	not held	
1975	(Austria) Franz Wittmann, Sr.	BMW 2002
1976	(Austria) Franz Wittmann, Sr.	Opel Kadett C
1977	(Austria) Franz Wittmann, Sr.	Opel Kadett C
1978	(Austria) Beppo Sulc	Volkswagen 1302S
1979	(Austria) Franz Wittmann, Sr.	Porsche Carrera
1980	(Austria) Franz Wittmann, Sr.	Audi 80 GTE
1981	(Austria) Franz Wittmann, Sr.	Audi Quattro
1982	(Austria) Franz Wittmann, Sr.	Audi Quattro
1983	(Austria) Franz Wittmann, Sr.	Audi Quattro A1
1984	(Austria) Franz Wittmann, Sr.	Audi Quattro A2
1985	(Austria) Wilfried Wiedner	Audi Quattro A2
1986	(Austria) Georg Fischer	Audi 80 Quattro
1987 - 1999	not held	
2000	(Austria) Felix Pailer	Lancia Delta Integrale 16V
2001	(Austria) Herwig Hüfinger	Mazda 323 4WD
2002	(Germany) Hermann Gassner	Mitsubishi Carisma GT Evo VI
2003	(Austria) Franz Wittmann, Sr.	Toyota Corolla WRC
2004	(Austria) Raimund Baumschlager	Mitsubishi Carisma GT Evo V
2005	(Czech Republic) Václav Pech, Jr.	Ford Focus RS WRC
2006	(Austria) Raimund Baumschlager	Mitsubishi Lancer Evo VIII
2007	(Czech Republic) Václav Pech, Jr.	Mitsubishi Lancer Evo IX
2008	(Czech Republic) Václav Pech, Jr.	Mitsubishi Lancer Evo IX
2009	(Austria) Raimund Baumschlager	Mitsubishi Lancer Evo IX
2010	not held	
2011	(Austria) Beppo Harrach	Mitsubishi Lancer Evo IX
2012	(Czech Republic) Jan Kopecký	Škoda Fabia S2000
2013	(Czech Republic) Jan Kopecký	Škoda Fabia S2000
2014	(Poland) Robert Kubica	Ford Fiesta RRC
2015	(Poland) Kajetan Kajetanowicz	Ford Fiesta R5
2016; 2017	not held	
2018	(Austria) Johannes Keferböck	Ford Fiesta R5
2019	(Austria) Julian Wagner	Škoda Fabia R5
2020	(Austria) Hermann Neubauer	Ford Fiesta R5
2021; 2022	not held	
2023	(France) Adrien Fourmaux	Ford Fiesta Rally2
2024	(Austria) Michael Lengauer	Škoda Fabia Rally2 Evo
2025	(Austria) Michael Lengauer	Škoda Fabia RS Rally2

== See also ==
- Andros Trophy
- Sno*Drift
