= 2014 Internationale Jänner Rallye =

2014 Internationale Jänner Rallye: 31. Internationale Jänner Rallye 2014
Round 1 of 12 of the 2014 European Rally Championship
← Previous event	Next event →
- Host country: Austria
- Rally base: (Austria) Freistadt
- Dates run: 3 – 5 January 2014
- Stages: 18
- Stage surface: Tarmac/Snow

Statistics
- Crews: 79 at start, 50 at finish

Overall results
- Overall winner: (Poland) Robert Kubica; RK M-Sport WRT

The 2014 Internationale Jänner Rallye was the first round of the 2014 European Rally Championship season, held in Austria between 3–5 January 2014.

The rally was won by ex-Formula One driver and WRC-2 champion Robert Kubica and co-driver Maciej Szczepaniak.

== Results ==
Pos	No	Driver	Co-driver	Entrant	Car	Time/Retired	Points
1	1	(Poland) Robert Kubica	(Poland) Maciej Szczepaniak	RK M-Sport WRT	Ford Fiesta RRC	2:26:42.4	39
2	5	(Czech Republic) Václav Pech	(Czech Republic) Petr Uhel	EuroOil Invelt Team	Mini Cooper S2000 1.6T	2:27:02.3	30
3	6	(Austria) Raimund Baumschlager	(Germany) Klaus Wicha	Baumschlager Rallye & Racing	Škoda Fabia S2000	2:28:21.3	24
4	12	(Austria) Beppo Harrach	(Austria) Leop Welsersheimb		Mitsubishi Lancer Evo IX R4	1:29:42.7	20
5	20	(Czech Republic) Jaromir Tarabus	(Czech Republic) Daniel Trunkát	Jipocar Czech National Team	Škoda Fabia S2000	2:30:22.0	17
6	2	(Austria) Andreas Aigner	(Austria) Barbara Watzl	Stohl Racing	Peugeot 207 S2000	2:31:15.8	12
7	3	(Russia) Vasily Gryazin	(Russia) Dmitry Chumak	Sports Racing Technologies	Ford Fiesta S2000	2:33:09.8	7
8	16	(Czech Republic) Roman Odlozilik	(Czech Republic) Martin Turecek	TRT Czech Rally Sport	Ford Fiesta R5	2:33:58.7	5
9	14	(France) Robert Consani	(France) Vincent Landais		Peugeot 207 S2000	2:36:24.6	2
10	21	(Austria) Hermann Neubauer	(Austria) Bernhard Ettel	Stohl Racing	Subaru Impreza STI R4	2:36:24.6	1
Did not finish
SS6	4	(Poland) Kajetan Katejanowicz	(Poland) Jaroslaw Baran	Lotos Rally Team	Ford Fiesta R5	Accident	
SS4	8	(Italy) Simone Tempestini	(Romania) Dorin Pulpea		Subaru Impreza STi R4	Mechanical	
SS8	11	(Czech Republic) Jan Černý	(Czech Republic) Pavel Kohout	Jipocar Czech National Team	Subaru Impreza STi R4	Mechanical	
SS13	15	(Ukraine) Vitaliy Pushkar	(Ukraine) Ivan Mishyn		Mitsubishi Lancer Evo X R4	Mechanical	
