= Škoda Fabia S2000 =

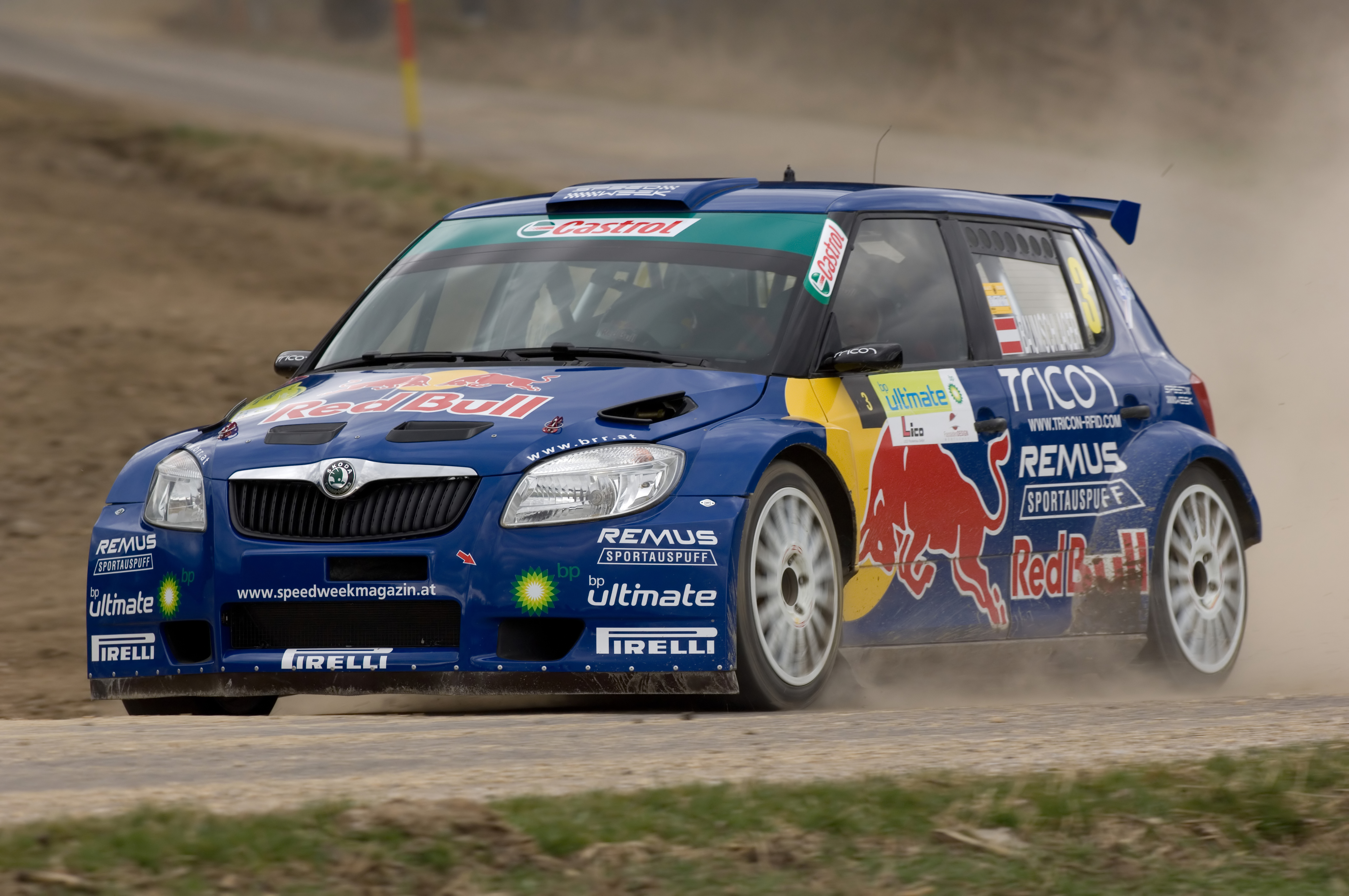

Overview
- Manufacturer: Škoda Auto/Škoda Motorsport
- Production: 2009–
- Assembly: Mladá Boleslav, Czech Republic

Body and chassis
- Class: Super 2000
- Layout: 4-wheel drive

Powertrain
- Engine: 2.0 L (122 cu in) 4-cylinder, 16-valve
- Transmission: X-trac six-speed sequential gearbox with AP Racing clutch

Dimensions
- Wheelbase: 2,486 mm (97.9 in)
- Length: 4,000 mm (160 in)
- Width: 1,820 mm (72 in)
- Kerb weight: 1,200 kg (2,646 lb)

Chronology
- Predecessor: Škoda Fabia WRC
- Successor: Škoda Fabia R5

The Škoda Fabia S2000 is a Super 2000 rally car built by Škoda Motorsport. It is based upon the Škoda Fabia road car.

== History ==
It made its début at Rallye Monte Carlo 2009, with factory team Škoda Motorsport and drivers Jan Kopecký and Juho Hänninen. The car appeared as fast as Hänninen was leading until a crash. Biggest success of the Fabia S2000 is Hänninen's IRC title with title in manufacturers for Škoda. Škoda Fabia S2000 won many national and international rally titles. Juho Hänninen won IRC in 2010, Andreas Mikkelsen won IRC in 2011 and 2012, Škoda became manufacturers champion in seasons 2010, 2011 and 2012. Juho Hänninen also won SWRC in 2011 In national championships in 2009 it was Pavel Valoušek in Czech Rally Championship, Matthias Kahle in Germany, Alberto Hevia in Spain, Raimund Baumschlager in Austria, Jozef Béreš in Slovakia and Roger Feghali in Lebanon. In 2010 it was Roman Kresta in Czech Republic, Jozef Béreš in Slovakia, Piero Longhi in Slovenia, Dimitar Iliev in Bulgaria and Andreas Mikkelsen in Italian Gravel Championship. The year of 2012 brought even more titles for Škoda Fabia S2000 including ERC for Juho Hänninen, Chris Atkinson won APRC, Škoda won manufacturers title in APRC, Jan Kopecký won in Czech, Mark Wallenwein in Germany, Raimund Baumschlager in Austria, Luca Rossetti in Turkey, Aleks Humar in Slovenia and Dimitar Iliev in Bulgaria.

In 2010, Škoda produced 200 special edition Skoda Fabia vRS S2000 cars for race fans in honor of their success in that year's Intercontinental Rally Challenge.

In 2024, the Škoda Fabia Super 2000 was named the Greatest Car of the European Rally Championship’s modern era according to fan votes.

== PWRC victories ==
No.	Event	Season	Driver	Co-driver
1	2009 Rally Norway	2009	(Sweden) Patrik Sandell	(Sweden) Emil Axelsson
2	2009 Cyprus Rally	2009	(Sweden) Patrik Sandell	(Sweden) Emil Axelsson
3	(Greece) 2009 Acropolis Rally	2009	(Greece) Lambros Athanassoulas	(Greece) Nikolaos Zakheos

== SWRC/WRC-2 victories ==
No.	Event	Season	Driver	Co-driver
1	2010 Rally Sweden	2010	(Sweden) Per-Gunnar Andersson	(Sweden) Anders Fredriksson
2	2010 Rally Finland	2010	(Finland) Juho Hänninen	(Finland) Mikko Markkula
3	(Germany) 2010 Rallye Deutschland	2010	(Sweden) Patrik Sandell	(Sweden) Emil Axelsson
4	2010 Rallye de France	2010	(Sweden) Patrik Sandell	(Sweden) Emil Axelsson
5	(United Kingdom) 2010 Wales Rally GB	2010	(Norway) Andreas Mikkelsen	(Norway) Ola Floene
6	(Greece) 2011 Acropolis Rally	2011	(Finland) Juho Hänninen	(Finland) Mikko Markkula
7	2011 Rally Finland	2011	(Finland) Juho Hänninen	(Finland) Mikko Markkula
8	(Spain) 2011 Rally Catalunya	2011	(Finland) Juho Hänninen	(Finland) Mikko Markkula
9	2012 Rally de Portugal	2012	(New Zealand) Hayden Paddon	(New Zealand) John Kennard
10	2012 Rally New Zealand	2012	(New Zealand) Hayden Paddon	(New Zealand) John Kennard
11	(Monaco) 2013 Monte Carlo Rally	2013	(Germany) Sepp Wiegand	(Germany) Frank Christian
12	2013 Rally de Portugal	2013	(Finland) Esapekka Lappi	(Finland) Janne Ferm
13	(United Kingdom) 2015 Wales Rally GB	2015	(Finland) Teemu Suninen	(Finland) Mikko Markkula

== IRC victories ==
No.	Event	Season	Driver	Co-driver
1	2009 Rally Russia	2009	(Finland) Juho Hänninen	(Finland) Mikko Markkula
2	(Czech Republic) 2009 Barum Rally Zlín	2009	(Czech Republic) Jan Kopecký	(Czech Republic) Petr Starý
3	(Spain) 2009 Rally Príncipe de Asturias	2009	(Czech Republic) Jan Kopecký	(Czech Republic) Petr Starý
4	2009 Rally Scotland	2009	(United Kingdom) Guy Wilks	(United Kingdom) Phil Pugh
5	2010 Rally Argentina	2010	(Finland) Juho Hänninen	(Finland) Mikko Markkula
6	(Spain) 2010 Rally Islas Canarias	2010	(Czech Republic) Jan Kopecký	(Czech Republic) Petr Starý
7	(Italy) 2010 Rally d'Italia Sardegna	2010	(Finland) Juho Hänninen	(Finland) Mikko Markkula
8	(Belgium) 2010 Ypres Rally	2010	(Belgium) Freddy Loix	(Belgium) Frederic Miclotte
9	(Portugal) 2010 Rali Vinho da Madeira	2010	(Belgium) Freddy Loix	(Belgium) Frederic Miclotte
10	(Czech Republic) 2010 Czech Rally	2010	(Belgium) Freddy Loix	(Belgium) Frederic Miclotte
11	2010 Rally Scotland	2010	(Finland) Juho Hänninen	(Finland) Mikko Markkula
12	(Spain) 2011 Rally Islas Canarias	2011	(Finland) Juho Hänninen	(Finland) Mikko Markkula
13	(Ukraine) 2011 Prime Yalta Rally	2011	(Finland) Juho Hänninen	(Finland) Mikko Markkula
14	(Belgium) 2011 Ypres Rally	2011	(Belgium) Freddy Loix	(Belgium) Frederic Miclotte
15	(Portugal) 2011 Rally Azores	2011	(Finland) Juho Hänninen	(Finland) Mikko Markkula
16	(Czech Republic) 2011 Czech Rally	2011	(Czech Republic) Jan Kopecký	(Czech Republic) Petr Starý
17	(Hungary) 2011 Mecsek Rallye	2011	(Czech Republic) Jan Kopecký	(Czech Republic) Petr Starý
18	2011 Rally Scotland	2011	(Norway) Andreas Mikkelsen	(Norway) Ola Fløene
19	2011 Cyprus Rally	2011	(Norway) Andreas Mikkelsen	(Norway) Ola Fløene
20	(Portugal) 2012 Rallye Açores	2012	(Norway) Andreas Mikkelsen	(Norway) Ola Fløene
21	(Spain) 2012 Rally Islas Canarias	2012	(Czech Republic) Jan Kopecký	(Czech Republic) Petr Starý
22	(Republic of Ireland) 2012 Circuit of Ireland	2012	(Finland) Juho Hänninen	(Finland) Mikko Markkula
23	(Italy) 2012 Targa Florio Rally	2012	(Czech Republic) Jan Kopecký	(Czech Republic) Petr Starý
24	(Belgium) 2012 Ypres Rally	2012	(Finland) Juho Hänninen	(Finland) Mikko Markkula
25	2012 Rally Romania	2012	(Norway) Andreas Mikkelsen	(Norway) Ola Fløene
26	(Czech Republic) 2012 Czech Rally	2012	(Finland) Juho Hänninen	(Finland) Mikko Markkula
27	(Bulgaria) 2012 Rally Sliven	2012	(Bulgaria) Dimitar Iliev	(Bulgaria) Yanaki Yanakiev

== ERC victories ==
No.	Event	Season	Driver	Co-driver
1	(Belgium) 2010 Ypres Rally	2010	(Czech Republic) Jan Kopecký	(Czech Republic) Petr Starý
2	(Portugal) 2010 Rali Vinho da Madeira	2010	(Czech Republic) Jan Kopecký	(Czech Republic) Petr Starý
3	(Switzerland) 2011 Rallye du Valais	2011	(Czech Republic) Antonín Tlusťák	(Czech Republic) Jan Škaloud
4	(Austria) 2012 Jänner Rallye	2012	(Czech Republic) Jan Kopecký	(Czech Republic) Petr Starý
5	2012 Croatia Rally	2012	(Finland) Juho Hänninen	(Finland) Mikko Markkula
6	2012 Rally Bulgaria	2012	(Bulgaria) Dimitar Iliev	(Bulgaria) Yanaki Yanakiev
7	(Belgium) 2012 Ypres Rally	2012	(Finland) Juho Hänninen	(Finland) Mikko Markkula
8	(Turkey) 2012 Bosphorus Rally	2012	(Finland) Juho Hänninen	(Finland) Mikko Markkula
9	(Czech Republic) 2012 Czech Rally	2012	(Finland) Juho Hänninen	(Finland) Mikko Markkula
10	2012 Rally Poland	2012	(Finland) Esapekka Lappi	(Finland) Janne Ferm
11	(Austria) 2013 Internationale Jänner Rallye	2013	(Czech Republic) Jan Kopecký	(Czech Republic) Pavel Dresler
12	(Spain) 2013 Rally Islas Canarias	2013	(Czech Republic) Jan Kopecký	(Czech Republic) Pavel Dresler
13	(Portugal) 2013 Rallye Açores	2013	(Czech Republic) Jan Kopecký	(Czech Republic) Pavel Dresler
14	(Belgium) 2013 Ypres Rally	2013	(Belgium) Freddy Loix	(Belgium) Frédéric Miclotte
15	2013 Sibiu Rally Romania	2013	(Czech Republic) Jan Kopecký	(Czech Republic) Pavel Dresler
16	(Czech Republic) 2013 Barum Czech Rally Zlín	2013	(Czech Republic) Jan Kopecký	(Czech Republic) Pavel Dresler
17	2013 Croatia Rally	2013	(Czech Republic) Jan Kopecký	(Czech Republic) Pavel Dresler
18	(Switzerland) 2013 Rallye International du Valais	2013	(Finland) Esapekka Lappi	(Finland) Janne Ferm
19	(Latvia) 2014 Rally Liepāja–Ventspils	2014	(Finland) Esapekka Lappi	(Finland) Janne Ferm
20	(United Kingdom) 2014 Circuit of Ireland	2014	(Finland) Esapekka Lappi	(Finland) Janne Ferm
21	(Belgium) 2014 Ypres Rally	2014	(Belgium) Freddy Loix	(Netherlands) Johan Gitsels
22	(Switzerland) 2014 Rallye International du Valais	2014	(Finland) Esapekka Lappi	(Finland) Janne Ferm

== Gallery ==
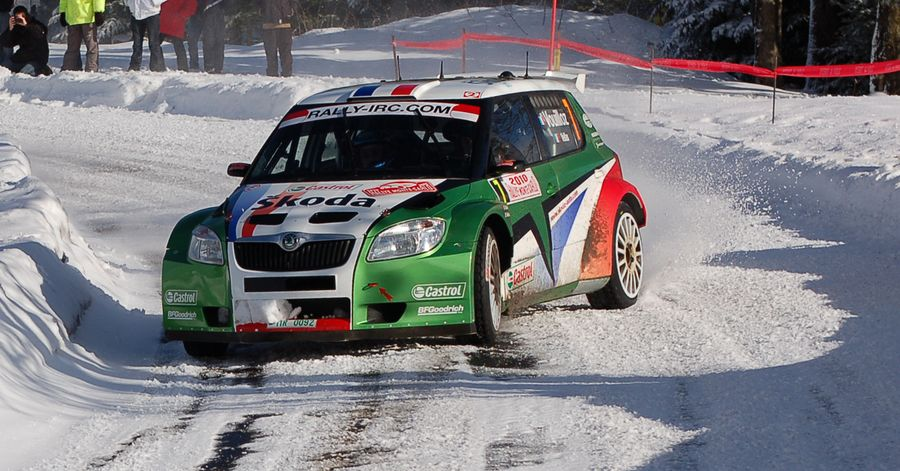
Nicolas Vouilloz at 2010 Rallye Monte Carlo

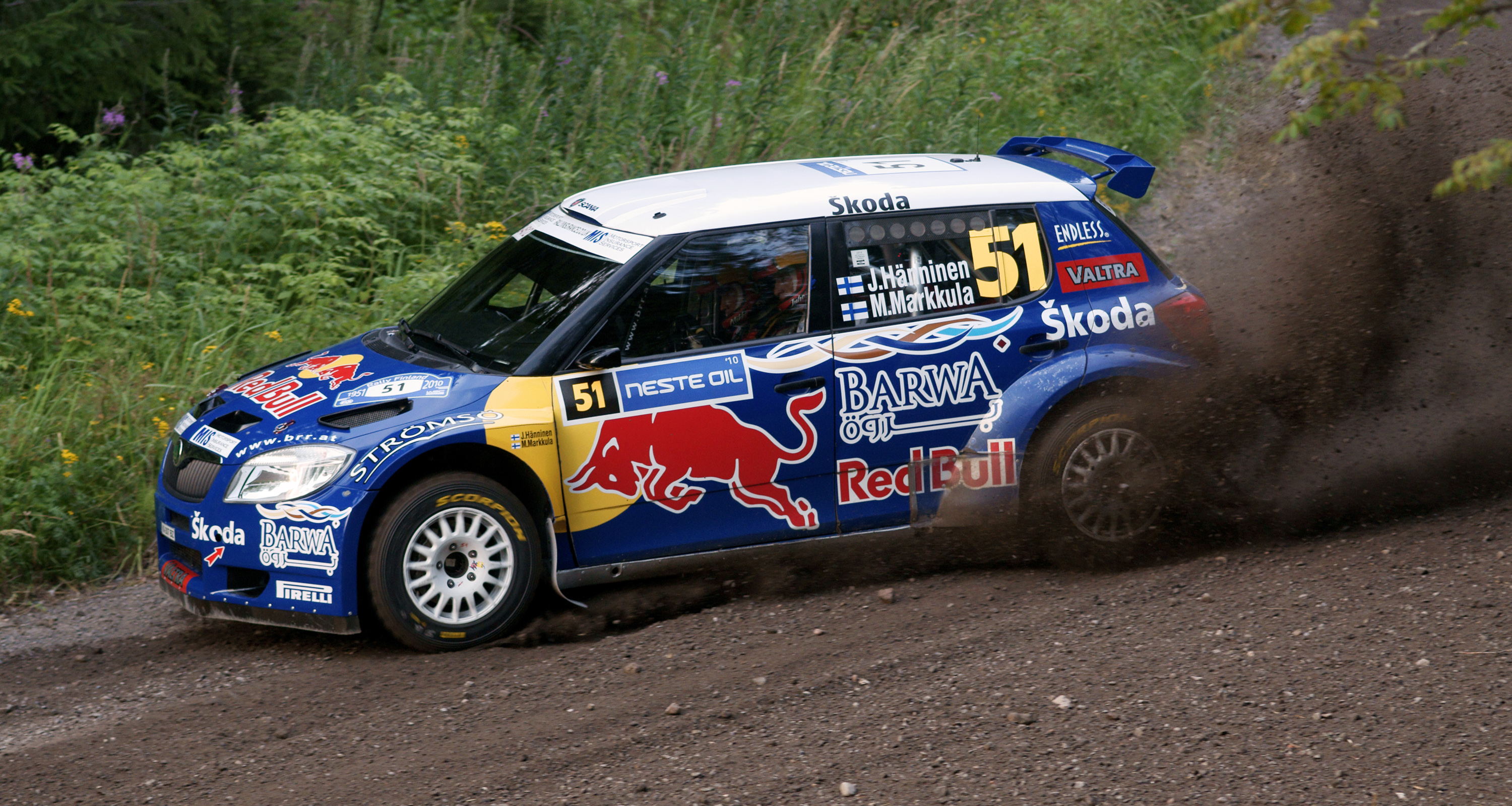
Juho Hänninen at 2010 Finland Rally

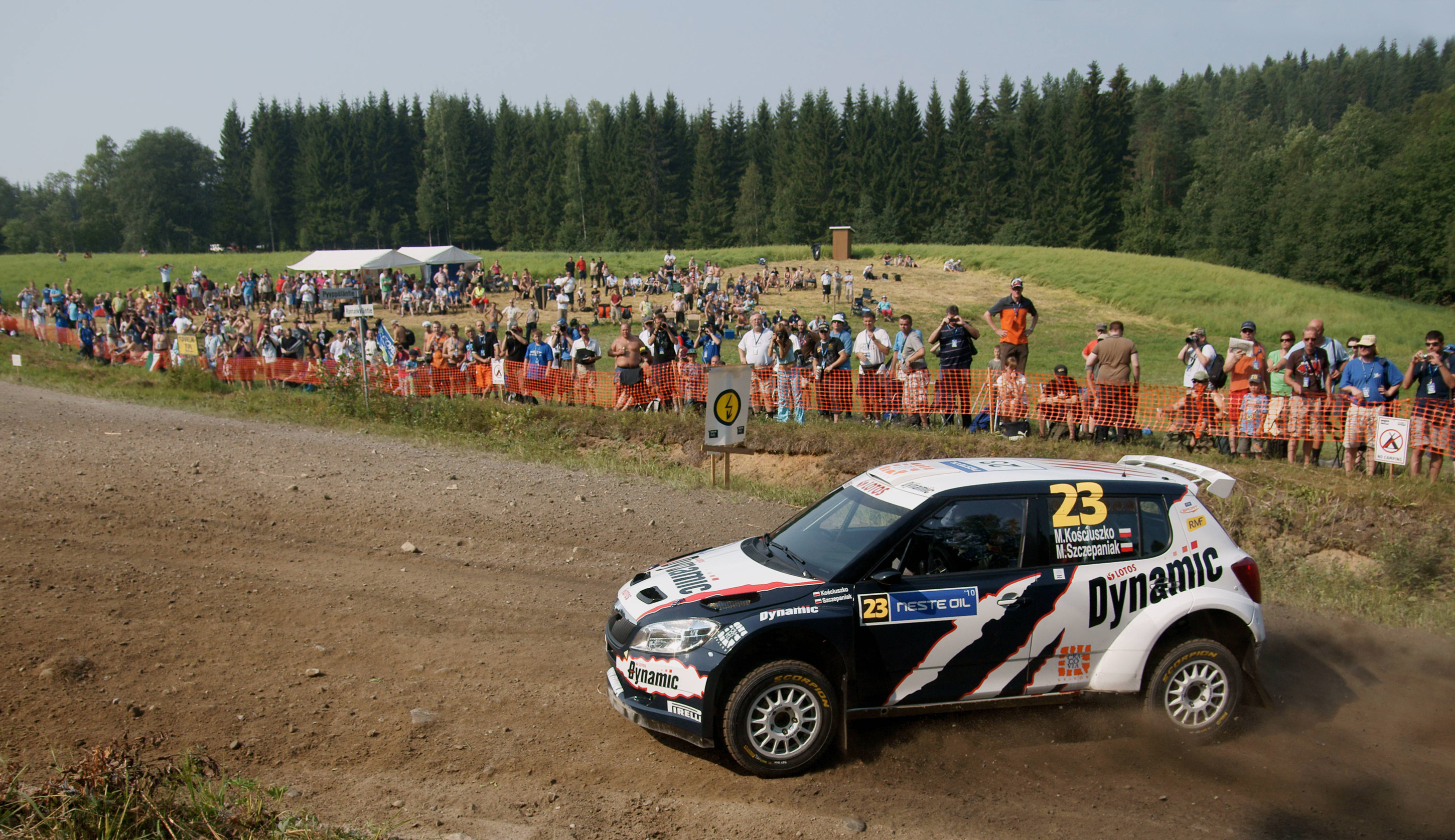
Michał Kościuszko at 2010 Finland Rally

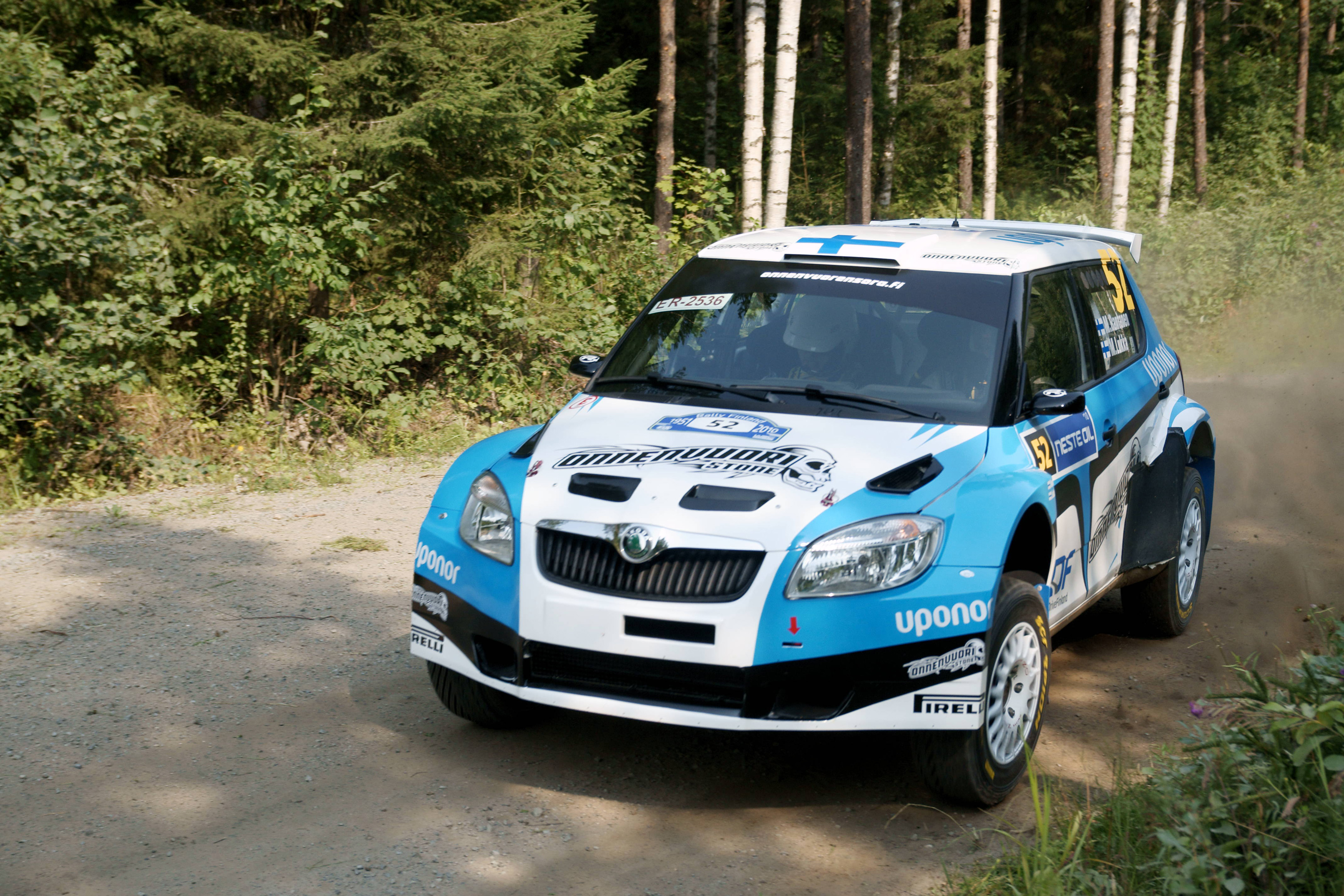
Matti Rantanen at 2010 Finland Rally

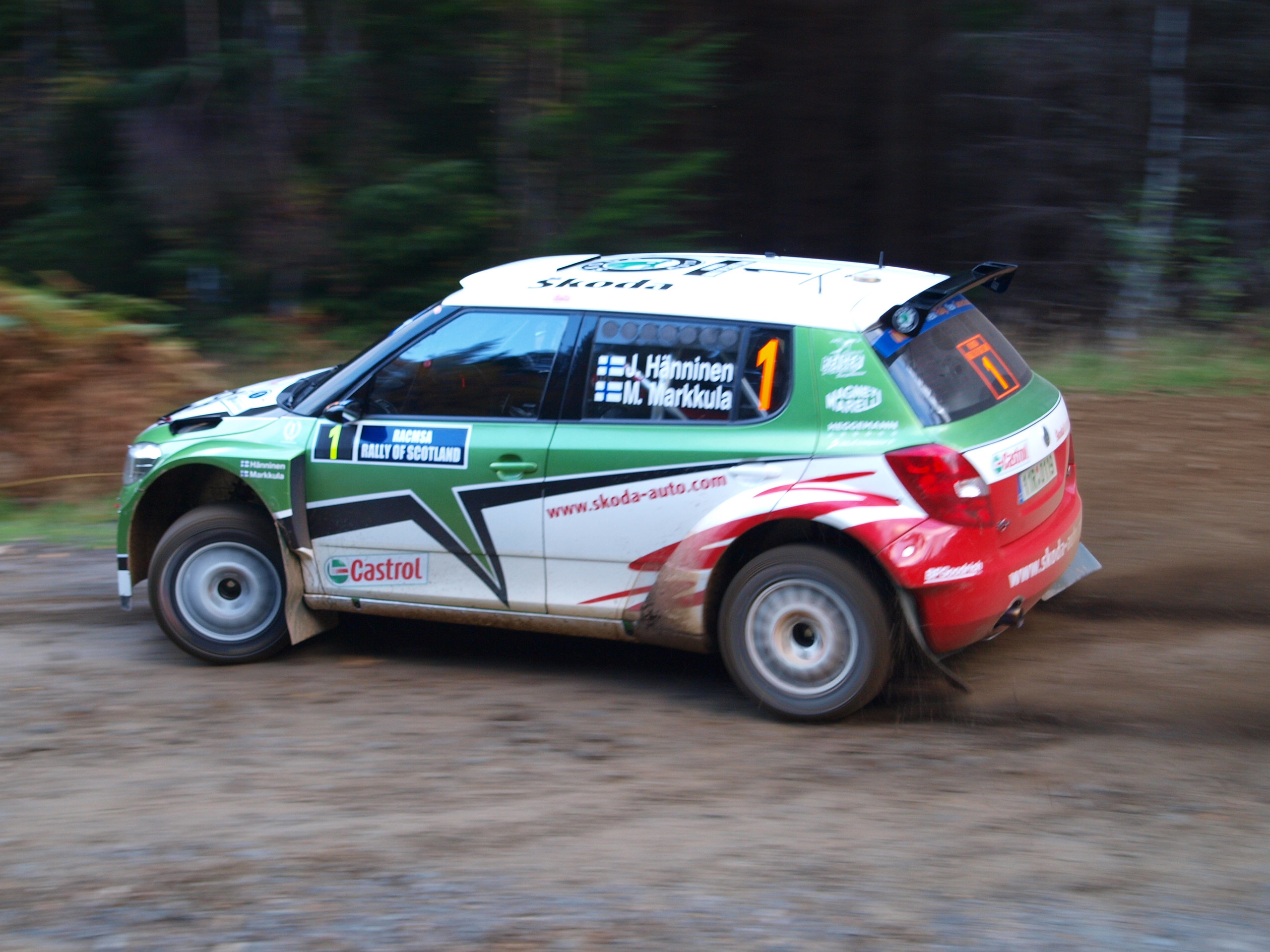
Juho Hänninen at 2010 Rally Scotland

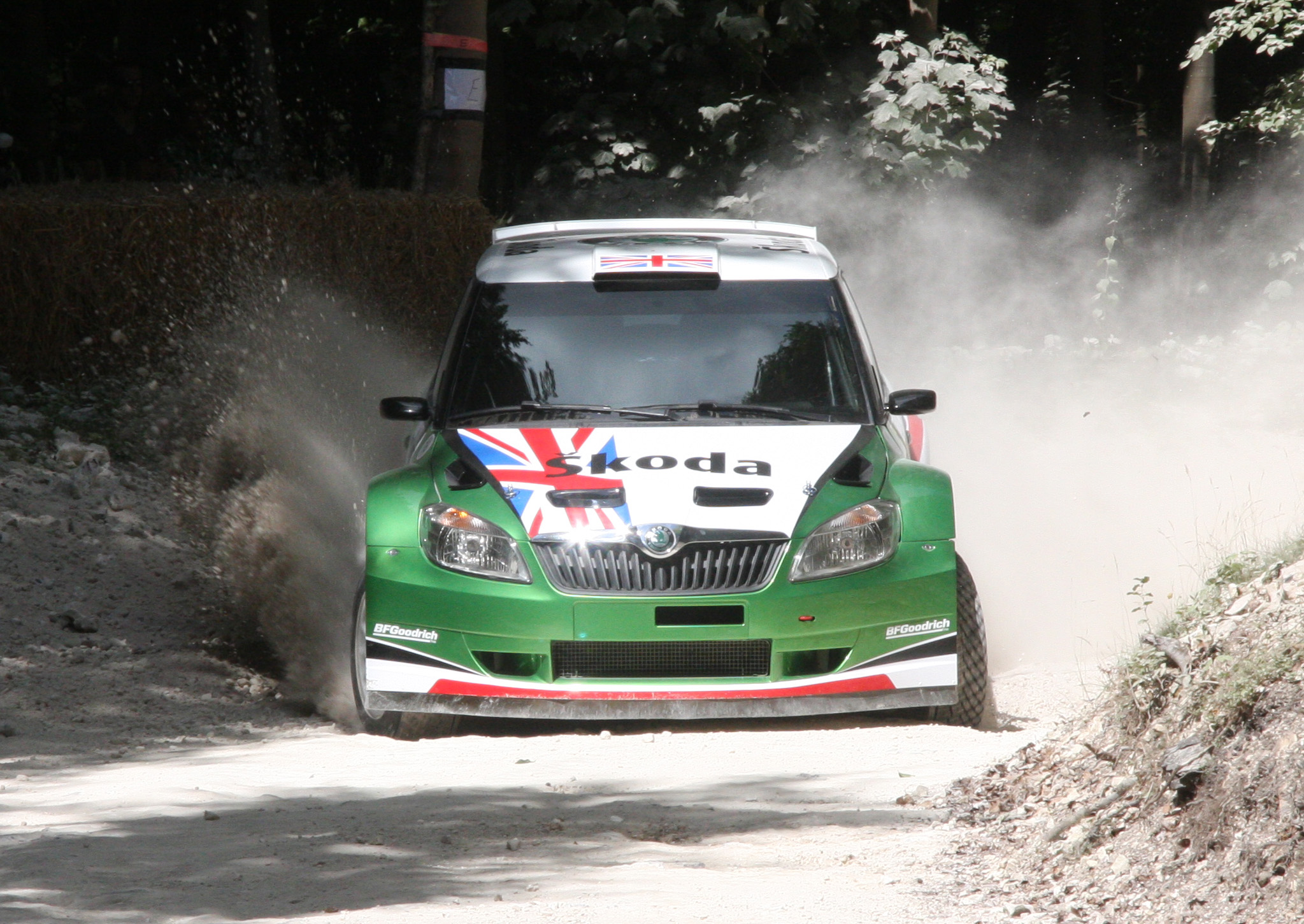
Guy Wilks in 2010

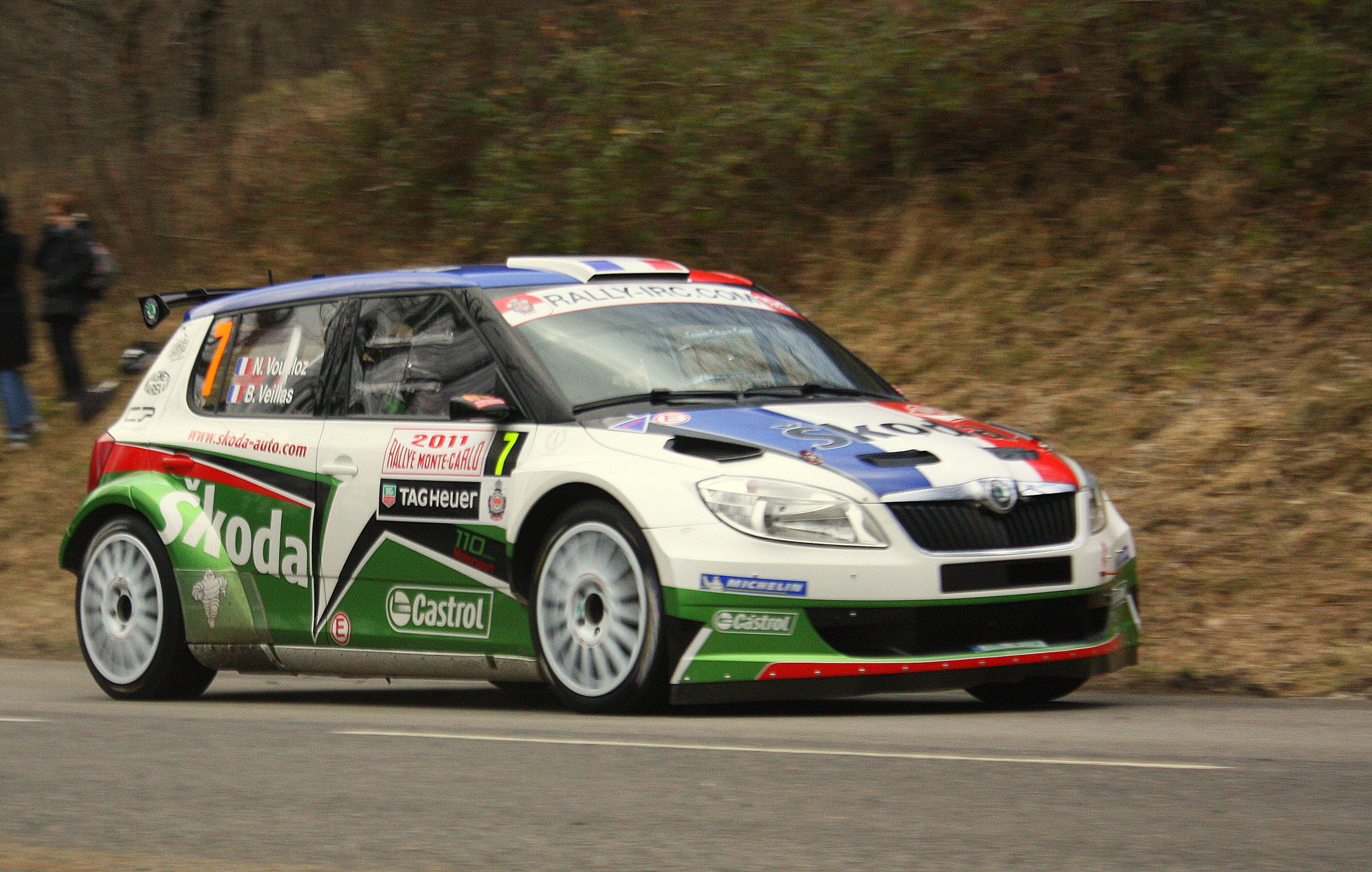
Nicolas Vouilloz at 2011 Rallye Monte Carlo

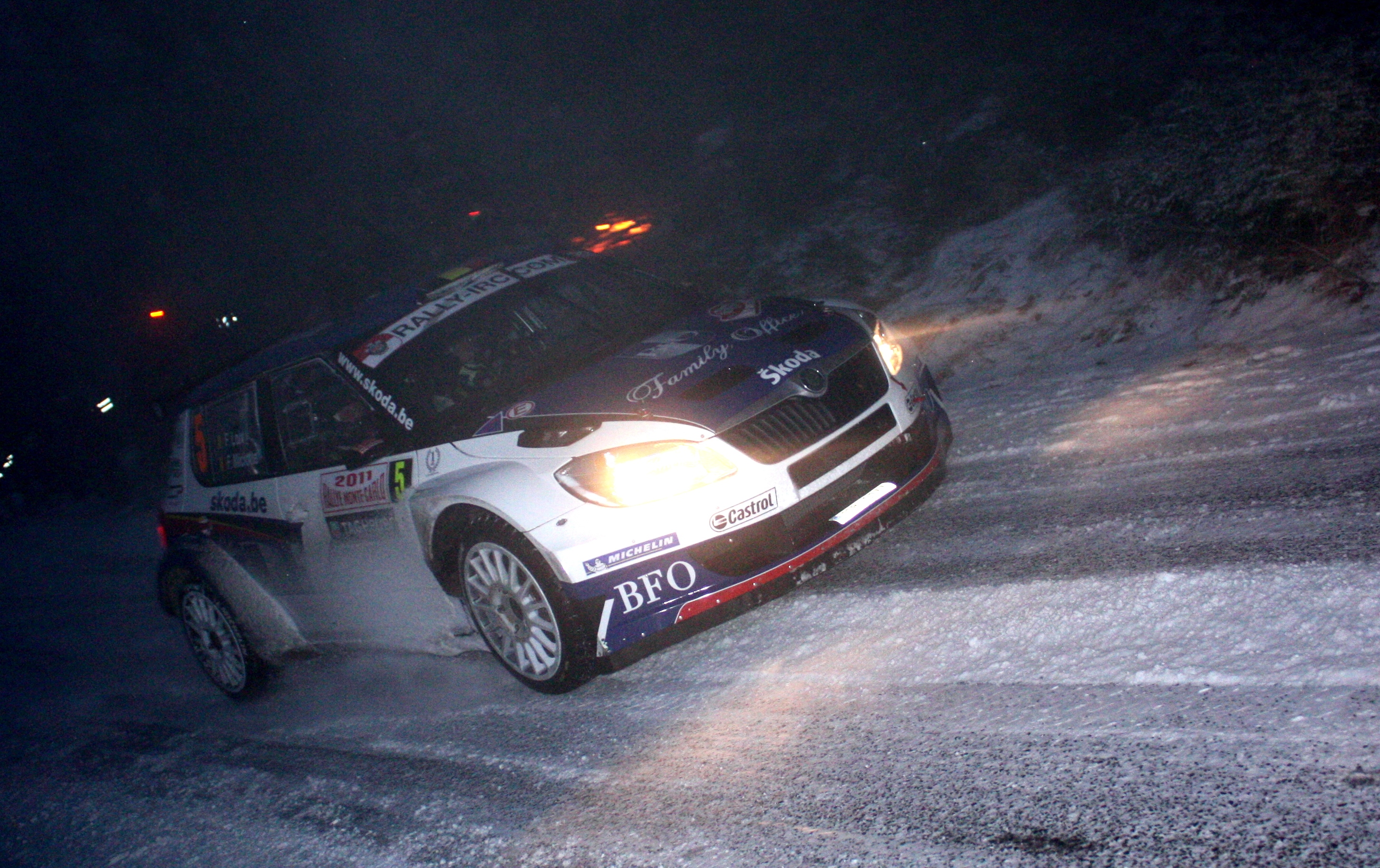
Freddy Loix at 2011 Rallye Monte Carlo

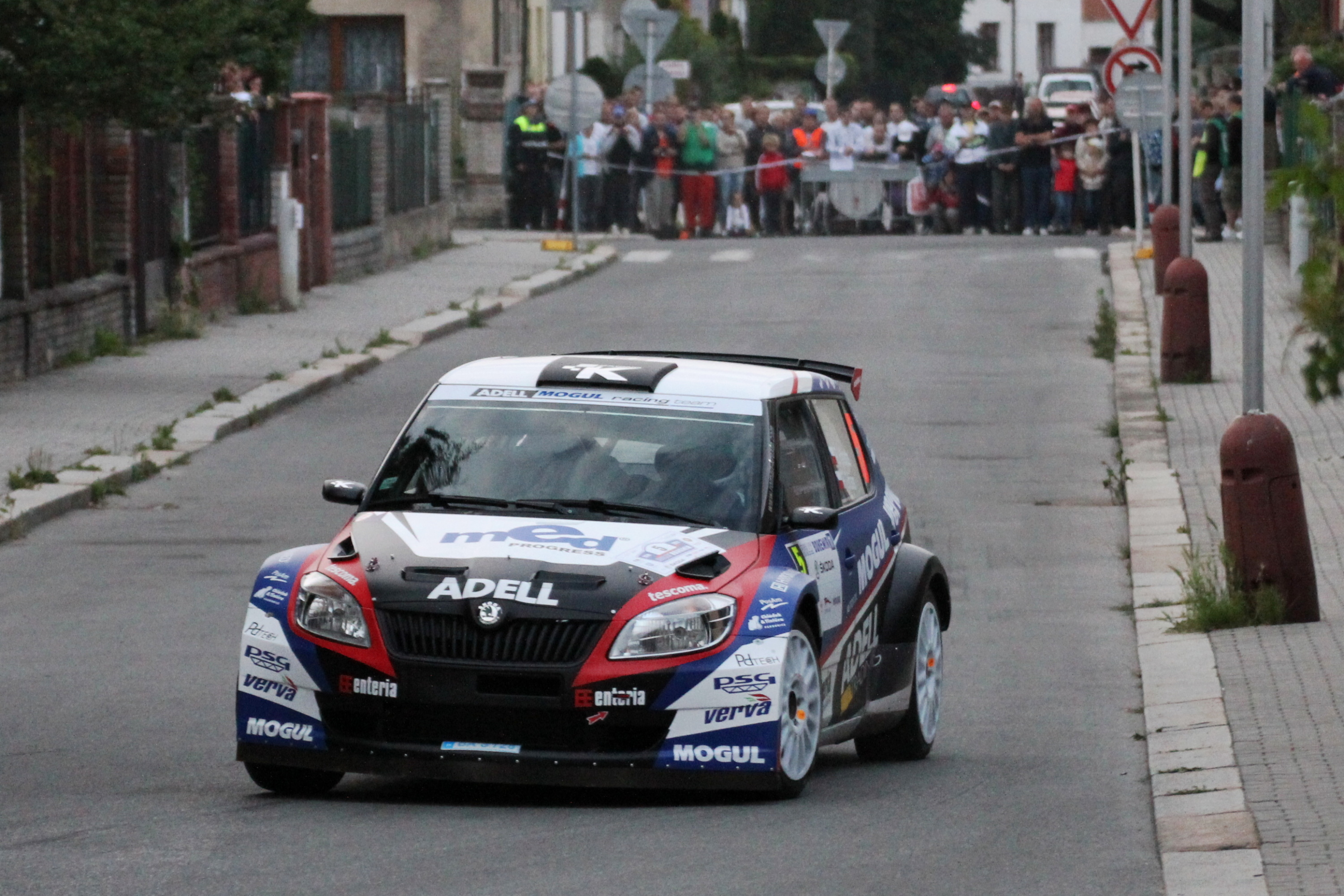
Roman Kresta at 2011 Rally Bohemia

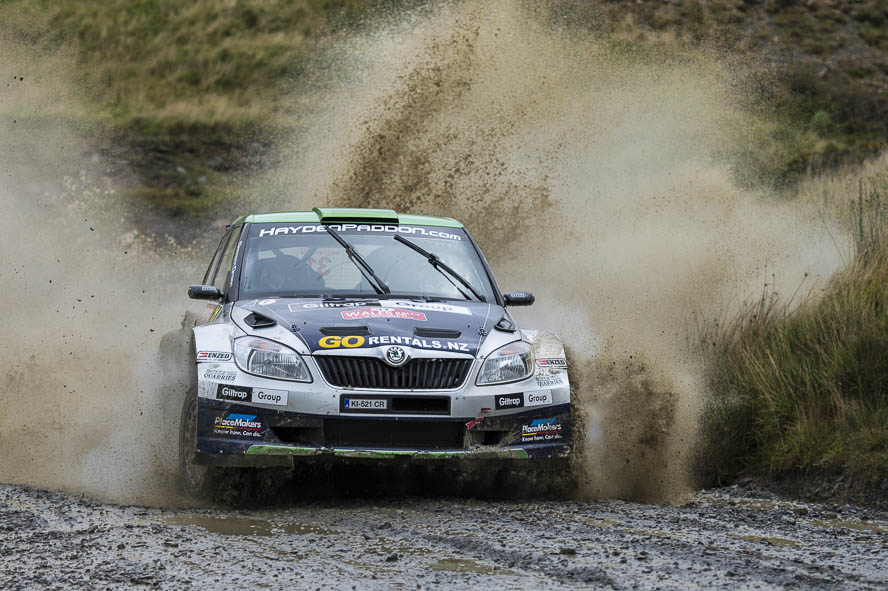
Hayden Paddon at 2012 Rally GB

== See also ==
- Škoda Motorsport IRC results
