= Karl Kruuda =

Estonian rally driver (born 1992)

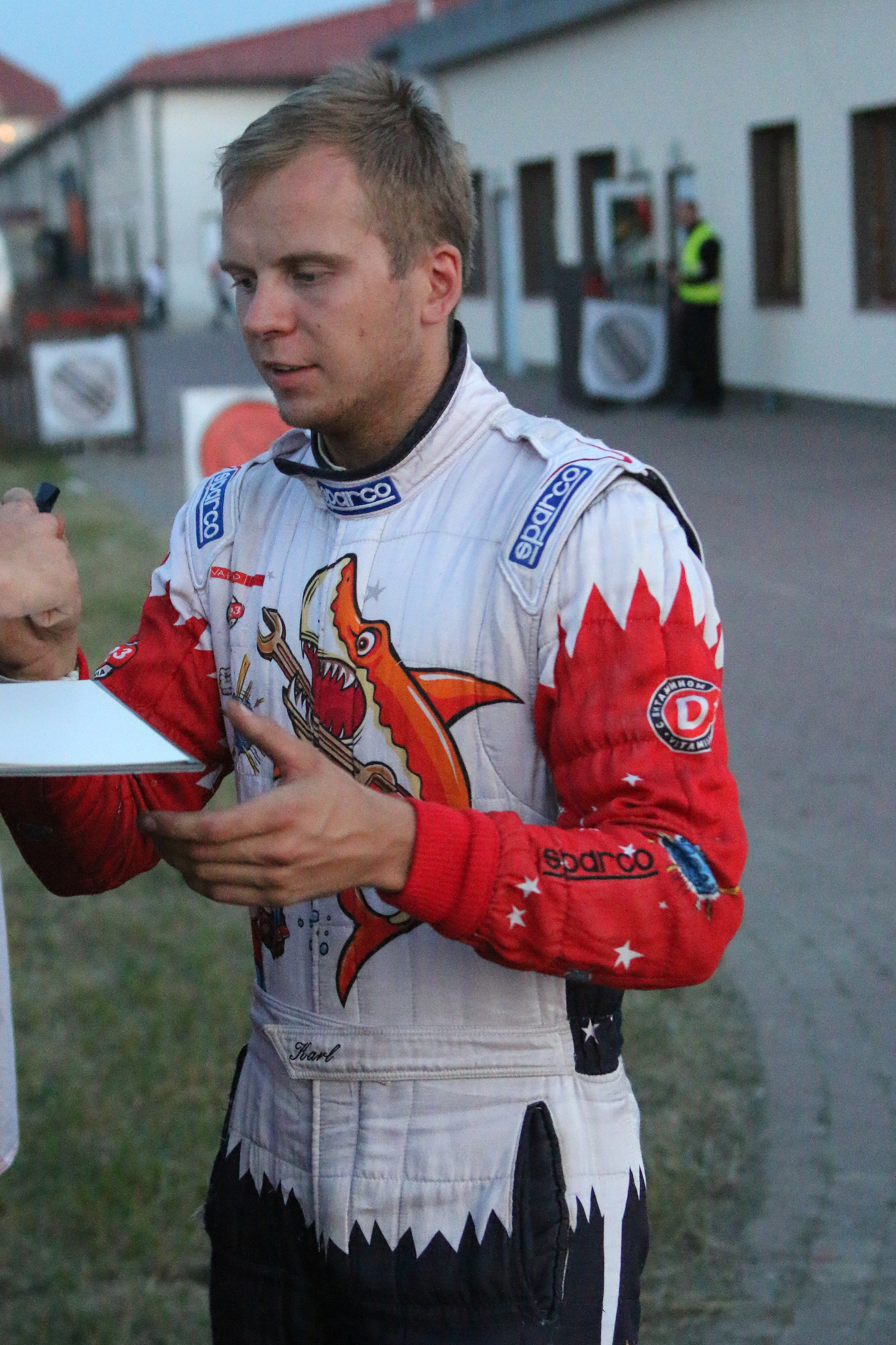
- Kruuda at the 2015 Rally Poland.

Personal information
- Nationality: (Estonia) Estonian
- Born: 31 December 1992 (age 33); Tallinn, Estonia

World Rally Championship record
- Years active: 2010–2016, 2020
- Co-driver: (Estonia) Martin Järveoja (2010–2016) (Australia) Dale Moscatt (2020)
- Teams: World Rally Team Estonia; MM Motorsport; ME3 Rally Team; DMACK World Rally Team
- Rallies: 36
- Championships: 0
- Rally wins: 0
- Podiums: 0
- Stage wins: 0
- Total points: 1
- First rally: 2010 Jordan Rally
- Last updated on: 6 September 2020.

Karl Kruuda (born 31 December 1992) is an Estonian rally driver.

== Rally career ==
Kruuda debuted in the World Rally Championship at the 2010 Jordan Rally, finishing in 22nd place. In the 2010 World Rally Championship season, he drove Suzuki Swift S1600. His best result of the year was second place in Junior World Rally Championship at the 2010 Rally de Portugal.

Kruuda drove Škoda Fabia S2000 and Ford Fiesta S2000 in the 2011 World Rally Championship season.

Kruuda took his first WRC point in the 2014 Rally Finland, finishing in tenth place. That same year, he also won Finnish Rally Championship.

In 2016, Kruuda signed for DMACK World Rally Team.

== Personal life ==
His father is businessman Oliver Kruuda.

== Racing record ==
=== WRC results ===
Year	Entrant	Car	1	2	3	4	5	6	7	8	9	10	11	12	13	14	Pos	Points
2010	World Rally Team Estonia	Suzuki Swift S1600	SWE	MEX	JOR; 22	TUR; 31	NZL	POR; 27	BUL; 18	FIN	GER; 30	JPN	FRA	ESP			–	0
2010	Karl Kruuda	Suzuki Swift S1600													GBR; Ret		–	0
2011	ME3 Rally Team	Škoda Fabia S2000	SWE	MEX; 15	POR; 13	JOR; 11	ITA; 21	ARG	GRE; 23	FIN; 27	GER; 22	AUS	FRA	ESP; 28			–	0
2011	Karl Kruuda	Ford Fiesta S2000													GBR; 28		–	0
2012	Karl Kruuda	Ford Fiesta S2000	MON	SWE	MEX	POR	ARG	GRE	NZL	FIN; 12		GBR; 21	FRA	ITA; Ret	ESP; 23		–	0
2012	Karl Kruuda	Škoda Fabia S2000									GER; Ret						–	0
2013	MM Motorsport	Ford Fiesta R5	MON	SWE	MEX	POR	ARG	GRE	ITA	FIN; Ret	GER; 18	AUS	FRA	ESP	GBR		–	0
2014	Karl Kruuda	Ford Fiesta S2000	MON	SWE; 11	MEX	POR; 12	ARG			FIN; 10	GER	AUS	FRA	ESP; 24	GBR; 16		28th	1
2014	Karl Kruuda	Peugeot 208 T16						ITA; 15	POL; Ret								28th	1
2015	ME3 Rally Team	Citroën DS3 R5	MON	SWE	MEX	ARG	POR; 26	ITA; Ret	POL; 14	FIN	GER	AUS	FRA	ESP	GBR		–	0
2016	Drive DMACK Trophy Team	Ford Fiesta R5	MON	SWE	MEX	ARG	POR	ITA; 11	POL; 23	FIN; Ret	GER	CHN	FRA	ESP	GBR	AUS	–	0
2020	Karl Kruuda	Volkswagen Polo GTI R5	MON	SWE	MEX	EST; 17	TUR	ITA	MNZ								NC	0

=== JWRC results ===
Year	Entrant	Car	1	2	3	4	5	6	Pos	Points
2010	World Rally Team Estonia	Suzuki Swift S1600	TUR; 6	POR; 2	BUL; 5	GER; 3	FRA	ESP	4th	51

=== SWRC results ===
Year	Entrant	Car	1	2	3	4	5	6	7	8	Pos	Points
2011	ME3 Rally Team	Škoda Fabia S2000	MEX; 4	JOR; 2	ITA; 6	GRE; 8	FIN; 7	GER; 5	FRA	ESP; 7	6th	64

=== WRC 2 results ===
Year	Entrant	Car	1	2	3	4	5	6	7	8	9	10	11	12	13	14	Pos	Points
2013	MM Motorsport	Ford Fiesta R5	MON	SWE	MEX	POR	ARG	GRE	ITA	FIN; Ret	GER; 5	AUS	FRA	ESP	GBR		29th	10
2014	Karl Kruuda	Ford Fiesta S2000	MON	SWE; 1	MEX	POR; 4	ARG			FIN; 1	GER	AUS	FRA	ESP; 7	GBR; 5		5th	90
2014	Karl Kruuda	Peugeot 208 T16						ITA; 4	POL; Ret								5th	90
2015	ME3 Rally Team	Citroën DS3 R5	MON	SWE	MEX	ARG	POR; 11	ITA; Ret	POL; 3	FIN	GER	AUS	FRA	ESP	GBR		25th	15
2016	Drive DMACK Trophy Team	Ford Fiesta R5	MON	SWE	MEX	ARG	POR	ITA; 3	POL; 10	FIN; Ret	GER	CHN	FRA	ESP	GBR	AUS	20th	16

=== WRC-3 results ===
Year	Entrant	Car	1	2	3	4	5	6	7	Pos.	Points
2020	Karl Kruuda	Volkswagen Polo GTI R5	MON	SWE	MEX	EST; 5	TUR	ITA	MNZ	20th	10

=== IRC results ===
Year	Entrant	Car	1	2	3	4	5	6	7	8	9	10	11	12	13	Pos	Points
2011	ME3 Rally Team	Škoda Fabia S2000	MON	CAN	COR	YAL; 8	YPR; 5	AZO	ZLI; 10	MEC; 11	SAN; Ret	SCO; 13	CYP; 4			10th	39
2012	Karl Kruuda	Škoda Fabia S2000	AZO	CAN	IRL	COR	ITA	YPR	SMR	ROM	ZLI; 6	YAL	SLI	SAN	CYP	44th	8

=== ERC results ===
Year	Car	Entrant	1	2	3	4	5	6	7	8	9	10	11	Pos.	Points
2012	ME3 Rally Team	Škoda Fabia S2000	JÄN	MIL	CRO	BUL	YPR	BOS	MAD	ZLI; 6	AST	POL; Ret	VAL	–	0
2014	ME3 Rally Team	Peugeot 208 T16	JÄN	LIE	GRE	IRE	AZO	YPR	EST; 6	CZE	CYP	VAL	COR	39th	10
2015	ME3 Rally Team	Citroën DS3 R5	JÄN	LIE	IRE	AZO	YPR	EST; Ret	CZE	CYP	GRE	VAL		–	0
