= Bruno Magalhães =

Portuguese racing driver

Personal information
- Nationality: (Portugal) Portuguese
- Born: 10 July 1980 (age 46)

World Rally Championship record
- Years active: 2000–2001, 2007, 2009, 2011, 2013, 2019, 2021
- Rallies: 9
- Championships: 0
- Rally wins: 0
- Podiums: 0
- Stage wins: 0
- Total points: 0
- First rally: 2000 Rally de Portugal
- Last rally: 2022 Rally de Portugal
- Last updated on: 15 June 2022.

Bruno Magalhães (born 10 July 1980) is a Portuguese rally driver. He is a regular competitor in the Intercontinental Rally Challenge, driving a Peugeot 207 S2000 for Peugeot Sport Portugal. He is a twice-podium finisher on the Rali Vinho da Madeira, finishing second in 2007 and second in 2009. He won the 2010 Rally Azores.

== Results ==
=== Titles ===
- Triple Portugal Rally Championship all categories, 2007, 2008 and 2009;

Portugues Champion Production : 2007;
Portugues National Champion : 2008 and 2009;

- Peugeot 206 Trophy: 2004;

=== IRC victories ===
- Rallye Açores : 2010

=== ERC victories ===
- Rallye Açores : 2017
- Rali Vinho da Madeira : 2012
- Acropolis Rally : 2018

=== Portuguese Championship victories (23) ===
- Rali Torrié : 2007, 2008, 2009;
- Rali Vinho da Madeira : 2007, 2008, 2009, 2011, 2012, 2013, 2014, 2015;
- Rali do Futebol Clube do Porto : 2007, 2008, and 2009;
- Rali Centro de Portugal : 2007, 2008, and 2009;
- Rali de Mortágua : 2007, 2008, and 2009;
- Rali de Algarve : 2007, 2009 and 2019;
- Rally de Portugal : 2007 (17th GC) and 2008 (6th GC);
- Rallye Açores : 2008, 2010, 2017
- Rallye do Marítimo : 2009.

=== IRC results ===
Year	Entrant	Car	1	2	3	4	5	6	7	8	9	10	11	12	13	IRC	Points
2006	(France) Peugeot Total	Peugeot 206 S1600	RSA	YPR	MAD; 4	ITA										13th	5
2007	(France) Peugeot Total	Peugeot 207 S2000	KEN	TUR	BEL	RUS	POR; 2	CZE	ITA; Ret	SWI	CHI					10th	8
2008	(France) Peugeot Total	Peugeot 207 S2000	TUR	POR; 6	BEL	RUS	POR; 8	CZE	ESP; Ret	ITA	SWI	CHI				21st	4
2009	(France) Peugeot Total	Peugeot 207 S2000	MON	BRA	KEN	POR; 9	BEL	RUS	POR; 2	CZE	ESP	ITA	SCO			10th	8
2010	Peugeot Sport Portugal	Peugeot 207 S2000	MON; 7	CUR; 5	ARG; 6	CAN; 5	SAR; 5	YPR; 6	AZO; 1	MAD; Ret	ZLI	SAN; 10	SCO	CYP		5th	30
2011	Peugeot Sport Portugal	Peugeot 207 S2000	MON; Ret	CAN; 8	COR; 5	YAL	YPR; Ret	AZO; Ret	ZLI	MEC; 9	SAN; 5	SCO	CYP			11th	26
2012	(Portugal) Bruno Magalhães	Peugeot 207 S2000	AZO; Ret	CAN	IRL	COR	ITA	YPR	SMR	ROM	ZLI	YAL	SLI	SAN	CYP	–	0

=== ERC results ===
Year	Entrant	Car	1	2	3	4	5	6	7	8	9	10	11	ERC	Points
2014	(Italy) Delta Rally	Peugeot 207 S2000	JÄN	LIE	ACR; 5	IRL	AZO; Ret	YPR; Ret	EST	ZLÍ; 10	CYP; 3	VAL; Ret	COR; 6	8th	54
2015	(Italy) Delta Rally	Peugeot 208 T16 R5	JÄN	LIE	IRL	AZO; 4	YPR; 4	EST	ZLÍ	CYP; 2	ACR; Ret	VAL; 13		6th	68
2017	(Portugal) ARC Sport	Škoda Fabia R5	AZO; 1	CAN; 3	ACR; 2	CYP; Ret	RZE; 9	ZLÍ; 9	RMC; 3	LIE; Ret				2nd	121
2018	(Portugal) ARC Sport	Škoda Fabia R5	AZO; 3	CAN; 7	ACR; 1	CYP; 2	RMC; 5	ZLÍ; 9	POL	LIE				3rd	113
