= Eric Camilli =

French rally driver (born 1987)

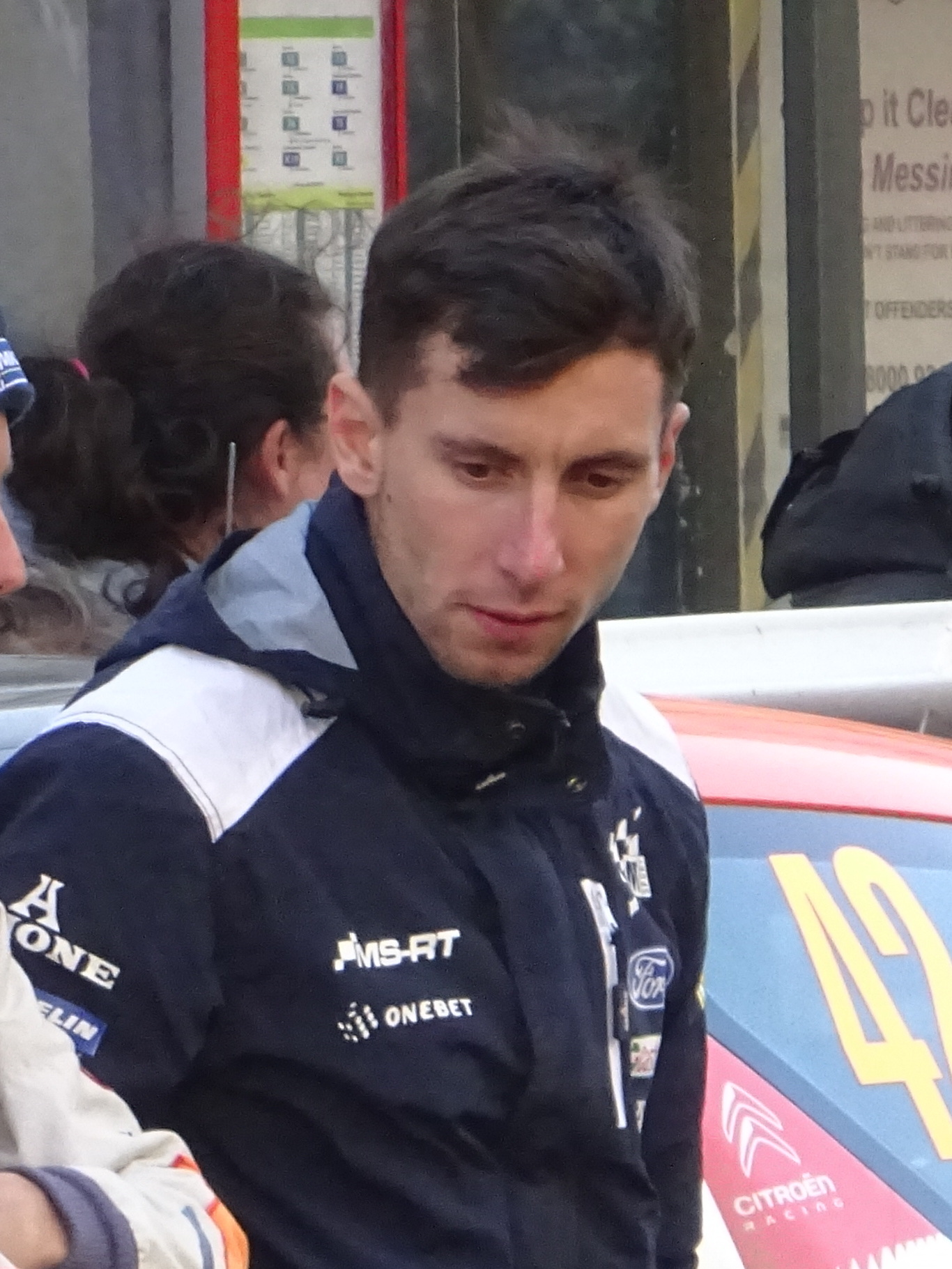
- Camilli in 2017

Personal information
- Nationality: (France) French
- Born: 6 September 1987 (age 39); Nice, France

World Rally Championship record
- Years active: 2014 – present
- Teams: M-Sport World Rally Team, Volkswagen Motorsport
- Rallies: 53
- Championships: 0
- Rally wins: 0
- Podiums: 0
- Stage wins: 1
- Total points: 39
- First rally: 2014 Rallye Deutschland
- Last rally: 2026 Croatia Rally

Eric Camilli (born 6 September 1987) is a French rally driver. He has competed in the World Rally Championship since 2014. After starting out in the lower levels, he made his debut in the top level in 2016 while driving for M-Sport in a Ford Fiesta RS WRC.

== Rally career ==
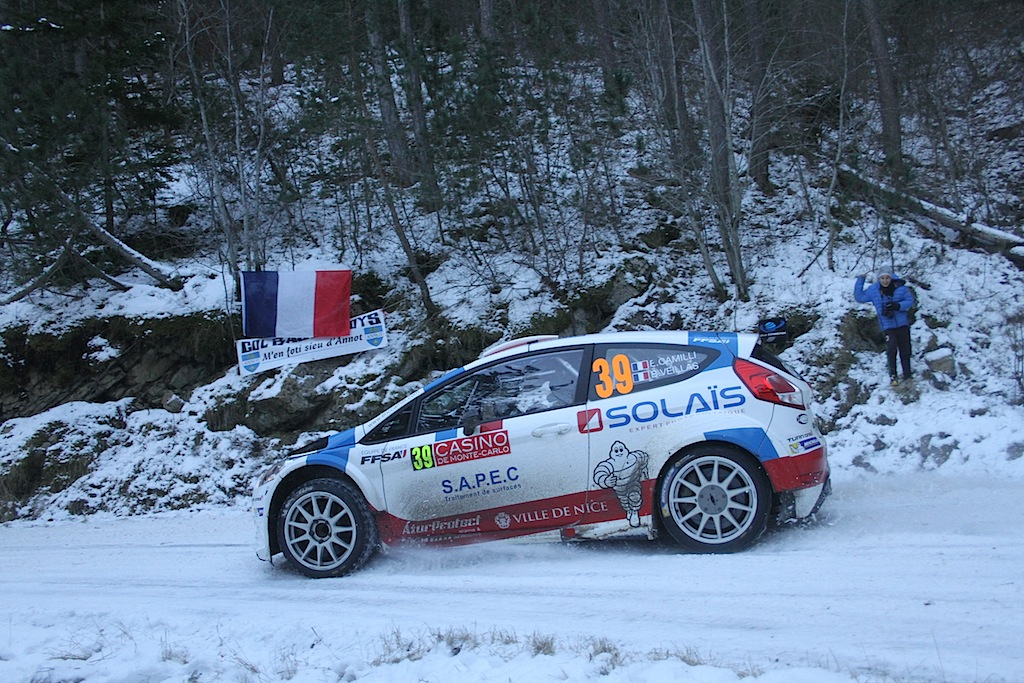
Camilli at the 2015 Monte Carlo Rally.

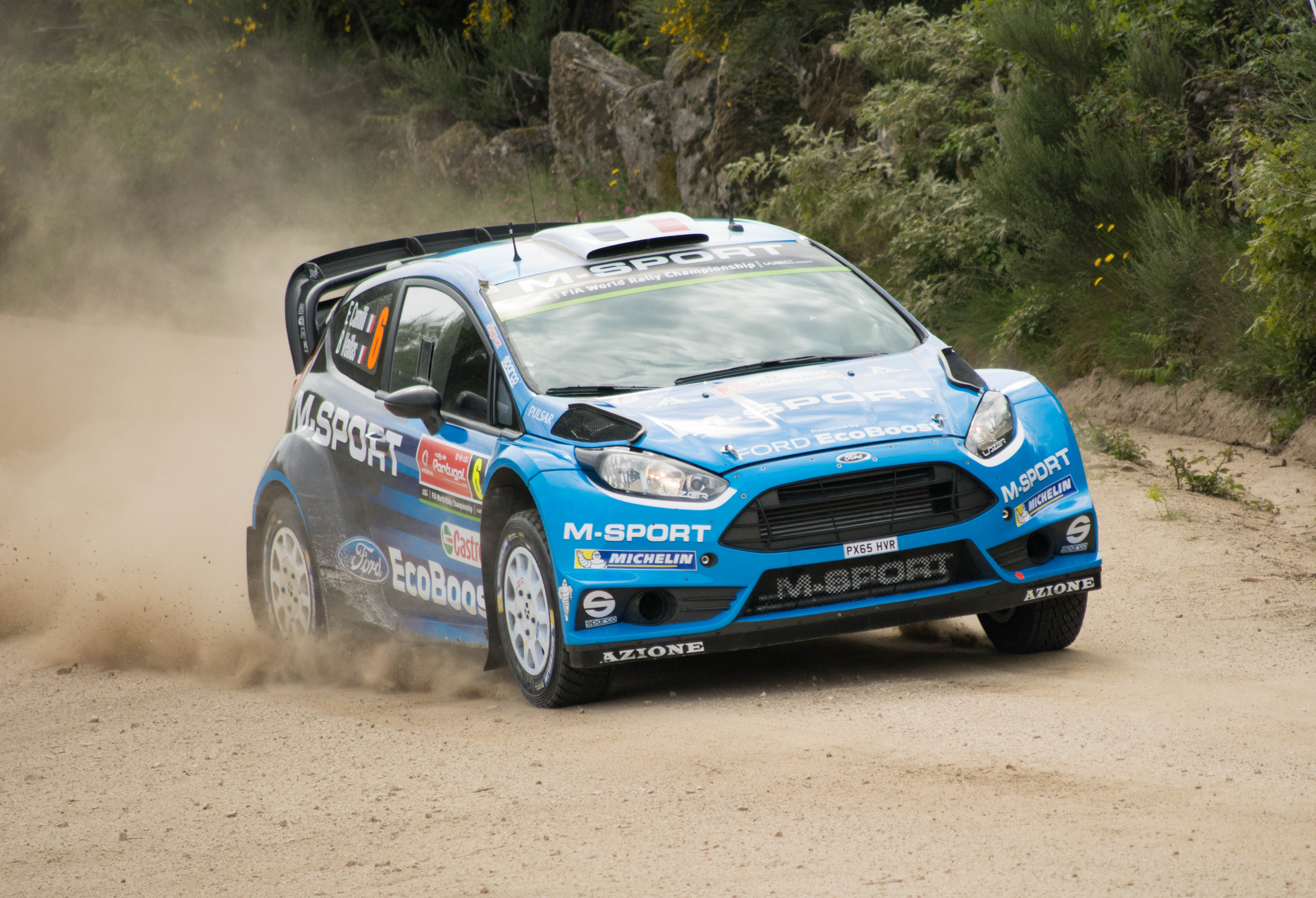
Camilli at the 2016 Rally Portugal.

Camilli signed for Malcolm Wilson's M-Sport ahead of the 2016 season, after a season in WRC-2. His best result of the season was fifth place which he achieved at the 2016 Rally de Portugal. He finished the season in 11th place with 28 points.

After M-Sport signed fellow Frenchman and reigning champion Sébastien Ogier at the end of 2016 to tackle the 2017 season, Camilli was demoted to drive in WRC-2 with M-Sport for the year. He won the WRC-2 class in Germany and finished the campaign in second place. Camilli was retained by M-Sport in the WRC-2 for 2018.

Camilli drove the Volkswagen Polo GTI R5 on its debut in a one-off appearance with Volkswagen Motorsport at the 2018 Rally Catalunya. He continued to run with the Polo as an independent in season 2019.

== Results ==
=== WRC results ===
(key)

Year	Entrant	Car	1	2	3	4	5	6	7	8	9	10	11	12	13	14	WDC	Points
2014	Rallye Jeunes FFSA	Citroën DS3 R3T	MON	SWE	MEX	POR	ARG	ITA	POL	FIN	GER; Ret	AUS	FRA; DSQ	ESP	GBR		-	0
2015	Team Oreca	Ford Fiesta R5	MON; 15	SWE	MEX	ARG	POR; Ret	ITA; 16	POL	FIN; 52	GER; 14	AUS	FRA; 16	ESP; Ret	GBR; 12		-	0
2016	M-Sport WRT	Ford Fiesta RS WRC	MON; Ret	SWE; Ret	MEX; 16	ARG; 8	POR; 5	ITA; 6	POL; 10	FIN; Ret	GER; 50	CHN; C	FRA; 8	ESP; 19	GBR; 10	AUS; Ret	11th	28
2017	M-Sport WRT	Ford Fiesta R5	MON; 12	SWE; 14	MEX; 11	FRA; 28	ARG	POR; 21	ITA; 9	POL; 14	FIN; 12	GER; 10	ESP; 16	GBR; 12	AUS		19th	3
2018	M-Sport Ford WRT	Ford Fiesta R5	MON; Ret	SWE	MEX	FRA	ARG	POR	ITA	FIN	GER; Ret	TUR	GBR; 24				NC	0
2018	Volkswagen Motorsport	Volkswagen Polo GTI R5												ESP; 35	AUS		NC	0
2019	Eric Camilli	Volkswagen Polo GTI R5	MON	SWE	MEX	FRA; Ret	ARG	CHL	POR	ITA							26th	1
2019	M-Sport Ford WRT	Ford Fiesta R5 Mk. II									FIN; 13	GER; 15	TUR	GBR			26th	1
2019	Eric Camilli	Citroën C3 R5													ESP; 10	AUS; C	26th	1
2020	Eric Camilli	Citroën C3 R5	MON; 9	SWE	MEX	EST	TUR	ITA; Ret	MNZ								23rd	2
2021	Sports and You	Citroën C3 R5	MON; 10	ARC	CRO	POR; 39	ITA	KEN	EST	BEL	GRE	FIN	ESP; 9	MNZ			25th	3
2022	Saintéloc Junior Team	Citroën C3 Rally2	MON; Ret	SWE	CRO; 13	POR; Ret	ITA; WD	KEN	EST	FIN	BEL	GRE	NZL	ESP	JPN		NC	0
2025	Eric Camilli	Hyundai i20 N Rally2	MON; 10	SWE	KEN	ESP	POR	ITA	GRE	EST	FIN	PAR	CHL	EUR	JPN	SAU	24th	1
2026	Eric Camilli	Škoda Fabia RS Rally2	MON; 10	SWE	KEN	CRO; Ret	ESP; 12	POR; 17	JPN	GRE	EST	FIN	PAR	CHL	ITA	SAU	31st	1

* Season still in progress.

=== WRC-2 results ===
Year	Entrant	Car	1	2	3	4	5	6	7	8	9	10	11	12	13	14	Pos.	Points
2015	Team Oreca	Ford Fiesta R5	MON; 4	SWE	MEX	ARG	POR; Ret	ITA; 8	POL	FIN; 11	GER; 2	AUS	FRA; 3	ESP; Ret	GBR; 2		10th	49
2017	M-Sport	Ford Fiesta R5	MON; 4	SWE; 4	MEX; 2	FRA; 8	ARG	POR; 7	ITA	POL	FIN	GER; 1	ESP	GBR; 2	AUS		2nd	91
2018	M-Sport Ford	Ford Fiesta R5	MON; Ret	SWE	MEX	FRA	ARG	POR	ITA	FIN	GER; Ret	TUR	GBR; 10				41st	1
2018	Volkswagen Motorsport	Volkswagen Polo GTI R5												ESP; 17	AUS		41st	1
2019	Eric Camilli	Volkswagen Polo GTI R5	MON	SWE	MEX	FRA; Ret	ARG	CHL	POR	ITA	FIN	GER	TUR	GBR			22nd	25
2019	Eric Camilli	Citroën C3 R5													ESP; 1	AUS; C	22nd	25
2021	Sports and You	Citroën C3 R5	MON; 3	ARC	CRO	POR; 8	ITA	KEN	EST	BEL	GRE	FIN	ESP; 1	MNZ			8th	51
2022	Saintéloc Junior Team	Citroën C3 Rally2	MON; Ret	SWE	CRO; 7	POR; Ret	ITA; WD	KEN	EST	FIN	BEL	GRE	NZL	ESP	JPN		40th	6
2025	Eric Camilli	Hyundai i20 N Rally2	MON; 2	SWE	KEN	ESP	POR	ITA	GRE	EST	FIN	PAR	CHL	EUR	JPN	SAU	23rd	17
2026	Eric Camilli	Škoda Fabia RS Rally2	MON; 4	SWE	KEN	CRO; Ret	ESP; 3	POR; 7	JPN	GRE	EST	FIN	PAR	CHL	ITA	SAU	15th	33

* Season still in progress.

=== WRC-2 Pro results ===
Year	Entrant	Car	1	2	3	4	5	6	7	8	9	10	11	12	13	14	WDC	Points
2019	M-Sport Ford WRT	Ford Fiesta R5 Mk. II	MON	SWE	MEX	FRA	ARG	CHL	POR	ITA	FIN; 2	GER; 2	TUR	GBR	ESP	AUS; C	6th	36

=== WRC-3 results ===
Year	Entrant	Car	1	2	3	4	5	6	7	8	9	10	11	12	13	Pos.	Points
2014	Rallye Jeunes FFSA	Citroën DS3 R3T	MON	SWE	MEX	POR	ARG	ITA	POL	FIN	GER; Ret	AUS	FRA; EX	ESP	GBR	NC	0
2020	Eric Camilli	Citroën C3 R5	MON; 1	SWE	MEX	EST	TUR	ITA; Ret	MNZ							7th	25

=== JWRC results ===
Year	Entrant	Car	1	2	3	4	5	6	Pos.	Points
2014	Rallye Jeunes FFSA	Citroën DS3 R3T	POR	POL	FIN	GER; Ret	FRA; 2	GBR	9th	18

=== ERC results ===
Year	Entrant	Car	1	2	3	4	5	6	7	8	9	10	11	Pos.	Points
2014	Eric Camilli	Peugeot 207 S2000	JÄN	LIE	ACR	IRE	AZO	YPR	EST	CZE	CYP	VAL	COR; 4	27th	20
