= Chris Ingram (rally driver) =

British rally driver (born 1994)

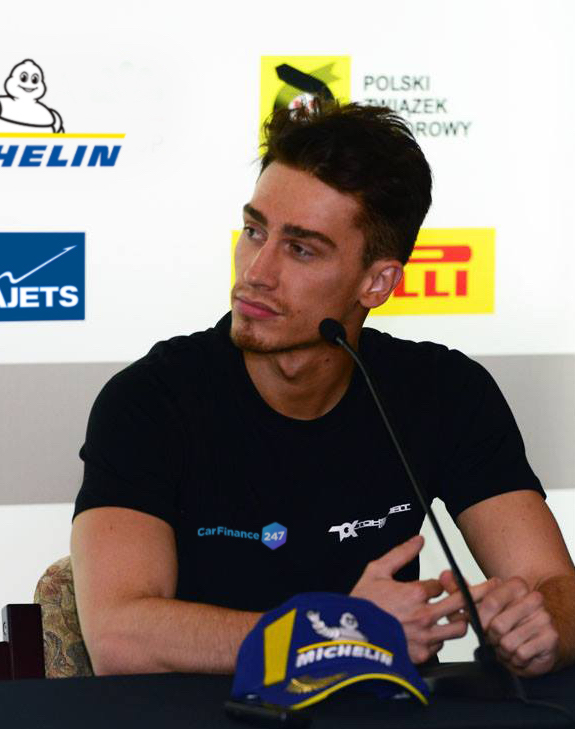
- Chris Ingram, ERC press conference 2019
- Nationality: (United Kingdom) British
- Born: 7 July 1994 (age 32) Manchester, England

Championship titles
- 2016 2017 2019: European Rally Championship 2 Wheel Drive Champion; European Rally ChampionshipJunior Under 27 Champion & ERC 3 Champion; FIA European Rally Championship Overall Champion

Awards
- 2012 2014 2015 2017: Motor Sport Association UK Young Driver of the Year; Colin McRae ERC Flat Out Trophy; Colin McRae ERC Flat Out Trophy; Colin McRae ERC Flat Out Trophy

Chris Ingram (born 7 July 1994 in Manchester) is a British rally driver who became the first Briton in over 50 years to win the FIA European Rally Championship (ERC) in 2019. In 2024, he secured the British Rally Championship (BRC) title, making him the first driver to clinch both the ERC and BRC titles. Ingram has also competed in the World Rally Championship (WRC), in the WRC2 category.

== Career ==
=== Early career ===
Ingram began rallying at the age of 15 in the F1000 British Junior Rally Championship. He finished second in his debut season in 2010, before winning six out of seven rounds to clinch the title in 2011. At the age of 17, after earning his road driving licence, he transitioned to forest rallies and won the RF 1400 class on his first attempt, driving a 1000cc Citroën C1.

In 2012, Ingram made his British Rally Championship debut in a Renault Sport Twingo R2, winning the Twingo R2 Trophy and driving the official Renault Sport Clio R3 on the Rallye du Var in France. His performances earned him the MSA Young Driver of the Year award — the first rally driver to win the title.

In 2013, Ingram made his debut in the European Rally Championship (ERC) at the Ypres Rally and later entered the World Rally Championship (WRC) for the first time, winning the RC4 category.

=== ERC Junior Years (2014–2017) ===
Ingram entered the inaugural ERC Junior Championship in 2014, earning the Colin McRae Flat Out Award after crashing out from the lead at the Circuit of Ireland. Later that season, he was signed by Peugeot UK, becoming the youngest manufacturer-backed British driver since Richard Burns. Alongside co-driver Gabin Moreau, he won the RC4 class at Wales Rally GB by over two minutes.

The pair returned in 2015 for a full ERC Junior campaign. Ingram claimed his first ERC Junior win at Rallye Açores and took his second Colin McRae Flat Out Award.

In 2016, Ingram joined Opel Motorsport, competing in the ERC Junior and ERC3 classes. He earned five consecutive podiums and won the ERC3 title after a standout victory at Barum Czech Rally Zlín.

In 2017, with Opel fielding a three-car team, Ingram dominated the season with wins in the Azores, Gran Canaria, and Rally Liepāja. He won the ERC Junior Under 27 and ERC3 titles.

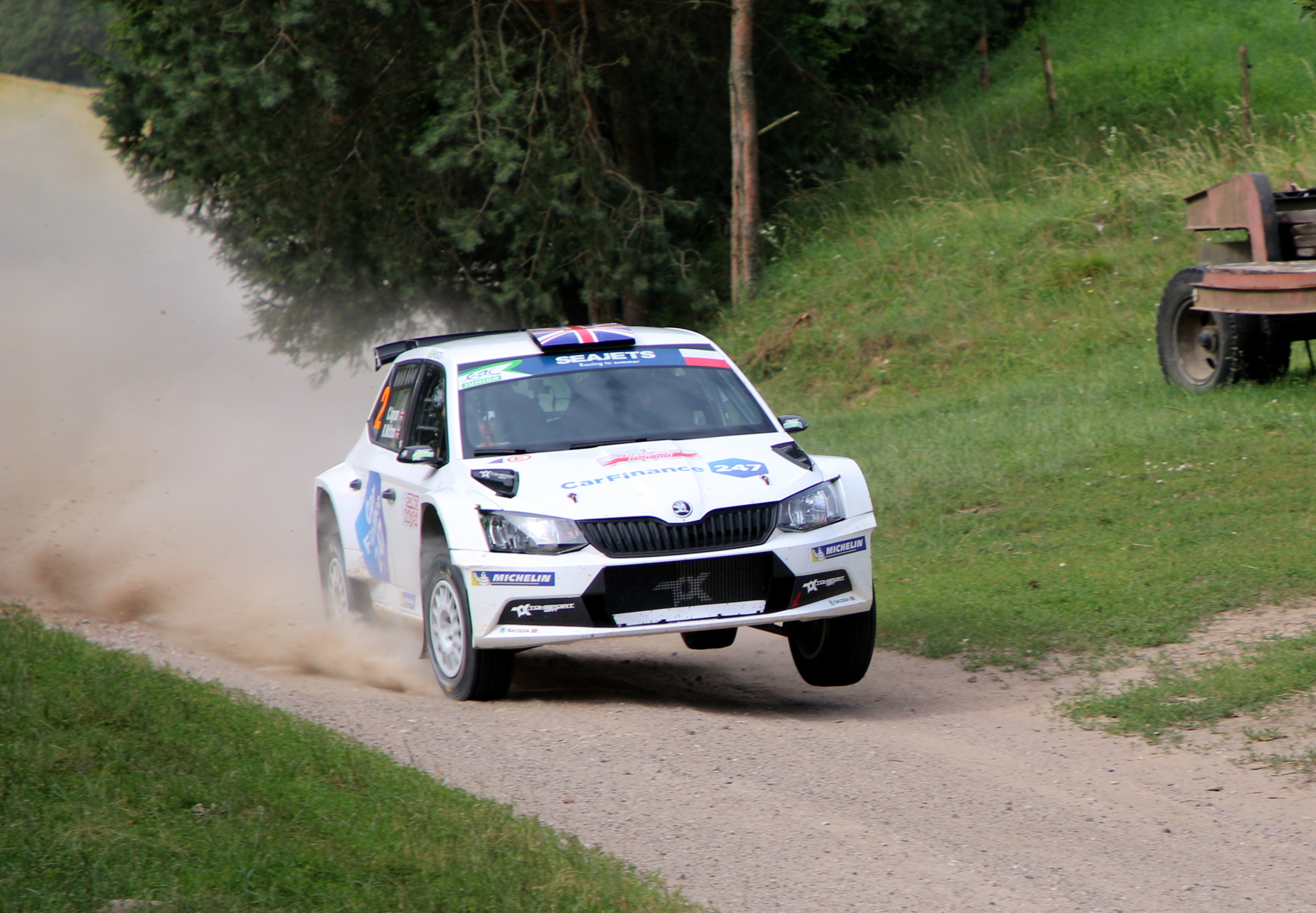
Chris Ingram, Rally Poland 2019

=== European Rally Championship (2018–2019) ===
In 2018, Ingram stepped up to four-wheel-drive competition with Toksport WRT, driving a Škoda Fabia R5. He finished fourth overall and first in ERC Junior U28 in his first event in the Azores. He also made his WRC2 debut at Rally Turkey, finishing third in class and ninth overall, ahead of Sébastien Ogier.

In 2019, Ingram and co-driver Ross Whittock completed a full ERC campaign with Toksport, claiming consistent podiums and dramatic finishes. After a tense finale, they won the FIA European Rally Championship, the first British crew to do so since Vic Elford in 1967.

=== Impact of COVID-19 ===
Following his 2019 European title, Ingram's momentum was severely impacted by the COVID-19 pandemic, which disrupted the global rally calendar and limited opportunities for competition and sponsorship. Despite his championship success, securing a full WRC program proved extremely challenging due to the economic aftermath of the pandemic. Ingram returned to the WRC2 category in 2022, contesting a part-season program.

=== World Rally Championship ===
Ingram has competed part-time in WRC2 since 2018. In 2022, he achieved two WRC2 Junior victories and 24 stage wins.

In 2024, at Rally Japan, Ingram set the fastest overall time in Shakedown. He retired with a technical issue later.

=== British Rally Champion (2024) ===
In 2024, Ingram won the British Rally Championship, securing victory in four of seven rounds:

- Round 1 - Legend Fires North West Stages (Lancashire, England)
- Round 4 - Grampian Forest Rally (Aberdeen, Scotland)
- Round 5 - Day 1 of ERC Rali Ceredigion (BRC)
- Round 7 - Cambrian Rally

Ingram competed in both a Volkswagen Polo GTI R5 and Toyota GR Yaris Rally2.

== Results ==
=== WRC-2 results ===
Year	Entrant	Car	1	2	3	4	5	6	7	8	9	10	11	12	13	WDC	Points
2018	Toksport WRT	Škoda Fabia R5	MON	SWE	MEX	FRA	ARG	POR	ITA	FIN	GER	TUR; 3	GBR; 12	ESP	AUS	24th	15
2022	Chris Ingram	Škoda Fabia Rally2 evo	MON; 7	SWE	CRO; 5	POR; 3	ITA; 4	KEN	EST	FIN	BEL; 4	GRE; Ret	NZL	ESP	JPN	7th	56

=== ERC results ===
Year	Entrant	Car	1	2	3	4	5	6	7	8	9	10	11	12	ERC	Points
2013	Chris Ingram	Renault Twingo RS R2	JÄN	LIE	CAN	AZO	COR	YPR; 30	ROM	CZE	POL	CRO	SAN	VAL	NC	0
2014	Chris Ingram	Renault Twingo RS R2 Evo	JÄN	LIE; 30	GRE	IRE; Ret	AZO; 14	YPR; 20	EST						NC	0
2014	Chris Ingram	Peugeot 208 R2								CZE; 35	CYP	ROM	VAL; Ret	COR	NC	0
2015	Chris Ingram	Peugeot 208 R2	JÄN	LIE; 14	IRE; 15	AZO; 15	YPR; Ret	EST; Ret	CZE; Ret	CYP	GRE	VAL			NC	0
2016	Opel Rallye Junior Team	Opel Adam R2	CAN	IRE; 18	GRE	AZO; 17	YPR; 14	EST; 10	POL	ZLI; 18	LIE; Ret	CYP			73rd	1
2017	Opel Rallye Junior Team	Opel Adam R2	ACO; 11	ESP; 21	GRC	CYP	POL; 26	CZE; 38	ROM; 14	LAT; 10					54th	1
2018	Toksport World Rally Team	Škoda Fabia R5	ACO; 4	ESP; Ret	GRC	CYP	ROM; 6	CZE; 7	POL; 3	LAT; 2					5th	90
2019	Toksport World Rally Team	Škoda Fabia R5	AZO; 3	CAN; 2	LIE; 4	POL; Ret	RMC; 6	CZE; 3	CYP; 2						1st	141
2019	Toksport World Rally Team	Škoda Fabia R5 Evo								HUN; 4					1st	141
