= Jaromír Tarabus =

Czech rally driver (born 1977)

Personal information
- Nationality: (Czech Republic) Czech
- Born: March 21, 1977 (age 49); Gottwaldov, Czechoslovakia

World Rally Championship record
- Years active: 2008–2009
- Co-driver: (Czech Republic) Daniel Trunkát (Czech Republic) Filip Schovánek
- Teams: AK Rallysport Brno
- Rallies: 3
- Championships: 0
- Rally wins: 0
- Podiums: 0
- Stage wins: 0
- Total points: 0
- First rally: 2008 Wales Rally GB
- Last rally: 2009 Rally de Portugal

Jaromír Tarabus (born 21 March 1977) is a Czech rally driver. He was third overall in Czech rally Championship in 2010, 2012 and 2013. Title in group N 2006. Titles in class N2 in 2001, 2003, 2005. Title in class N1 in 2000). He used to race in the PWRC in the 2008 and 2009 season.

Co-drivers: 2006-2010, 2012-2013: Daniel Trunkát (born also 21 March 1971). Daniel Trunkát also acts as main team manager (2006-2013). Rally-crew Tarabus-Trunkát is well known also as "T&T".

2000-2004: Igor Norek (born 26 November 1977)

2005: Václav Vorel

== Complete WRC results ==
| Year | Entrant | Car | 1 | 2 | 3 | 4 | 5 | 6 | 7 | 8 | 9 | 10 | 11 | 12 | 13 | 14 | 15 | WDC | Points |
|---|---|---|---|---|---|---|---|---|---|---|---|---|---|---|---|---|---|---|---|
| 2008 | Motoring Club | Fiat Abarth Grande Punto S2000 | MON | SWE | MEX | ARG | JOR | ITA | GRE | TUR | FIN | GER | NZL | ESP | FRA | JPN | GBR; 21 | - | 0 |
| 2009 | JM Engineering | Fiat Abarth Grande Punto S2000 | IRE | NOR; 19 | CYP | POR; Ret | ARG | ITA | GRC | POL | FIN | AUS | ESP | GBR | | | | - | 0 |

=== PWRC results ===
| Year | Entrant | Car | 1 | 2 | 3 | 4 | 5 | 6 | 7 | 8 | PWRC | Points |
|---|---|---|---|---|---|---|---|---|---|---|---|---|
| 2008 | Motoring Club | Fiat Abarth Grande Punto S2000 | SWE | ARG | GRE | TUR | FIN | NZL | JPN | GBR; 5 | 22nd | 4 |
| 2009 | JM Engineering | Fiat Abarth Grande Punto S2000 | NOR; 6 | CYP | POR; Ret | ARG | ITA | GRE | AUS | GBR | 21st | 3 |

=== IRC results ===
| Year | Entrant | Car | 1 | 2 | 3 | 4 | 5 | 6 | 7 | 8 | 9 | 10 | 11 | 12 | 13 | WDC | Points |
|---|---|---|---|---|---|---|---|---|---|---|---|---|---|---|---|---|---|
| 2008 | (Czech Republic) AK Rallysport Brno o.s. | Fiat Abarth Grande Punto S2000 | TUR | POR | BEL | RUS | POR | CZE; Ret | ESP | ITA | SWI | CHI | | | | - | 0 |
| 2009 | (Czech Republic) AK Rallysport Brno o.s. | Fiat Abarth Grande Punto S2000 | MON | BRA | KEN | POR | BEL | RUS | POR | CZE; Ret | ESP | ITA | SCO | | | - | 0 |
| 2010 | (Czech Republic) Czech Ford Rally Team | Ford Fiesta S2000 | MON | BRA | ARG | CAN | ITA | BEL | AZO | MAD | CZE; 8 | ITA | SCO | CYP; 4 | | 16th | 6 |
| 2011 | (Czech Republic) AK Rallysport Brno o.s. | Mitsubishi Lancer Evo IX | MON | CAN | COR | YAL | YPR | AZO | ZLI; 23 | MEC | | | | | | - | 0 |
| 2011 | (Czech Republic) Impromat Motorsport | Škoda Fabia R2 | | | | | | | | | SAN; 30 | SCO | CYP | | | - | 0 |
| 2012 | (Czech Republic) AK Rallysport Brno o.s. | Škoda Fabia S2000 | AZO | CAN | IRL | COR | MEC | YPR | SMR | ROM | ZLI; 4 | YAL | SLI | SAN | CYP | 33rd | 12 |

=== European Rally Championship (ERC) results ===
| Year | Entrant | Car | 1 | 2 | 3 | 4 | 5 | 6 | 7 | 8 | 9 | 10 | 11 | 12 | ERC | Points |
|---|---|---|---|---|---|---|---|---|---|---|---|---|---|---|---|---|
| 2013 | (Czech Republic) AK Rallysport Brno o.s. | Škoda Fabia S2000 | AUT; 9 | LAT | ESP | POR | FRA | BEL | ROM | CZE; 3 | POL | CRO | ITA | SWI | 15th | 25 |
| 2014* | (Czech Republic) Czech National Team | Škoda Fabia S2000 | JÄN; 5 | LIE; Ret | GRE; 9 | IRE | AZO | YPR | EST; 11 | CZE; 5 | CYP | ROM | VAL; Ret | COR; 8 | 12th | 41 |
| 2015 | (Czech Republic) T&T Czech National Team | Škoda Fabia S2000 | JÄN; 4 | LIE | IRE; 8 | AZO | YPR; 7 | EST | | CYP; 4 | GRE; 4 | VAL | | | 5th | 75 |
| 2015 | (Czech Republic) T&T Czech National Team | Škoda Fabia R5 | | | | | | | CZE; Ret | | | | | | 5th | 75 |
| 2016 | (Czech Republic) T&T Czech National Team | Škoda Fabia R5 | CAN | IRE; Ret | GRE; 3 | AZO | YPR; 7 | EST; Ret | POL | CZE; Ret | CYP | | | | 12th | 36 |
| 2017 | (Czech Republic) Jaromír Tarabus | Škoda Fabia S2000 | AZO | CAN | ACR | CYP | POL | CZE; 16 | RMC | LIE | | | | | - | 0 |
| 2018 | (Slovakia) Rufa Sport | Škoda Fabia R5 | AZO | CAN | ACR | CYP | RMC | CZE; 7 | POL | LIE | | | | | 25th | 12 |

* Season still in progress

=== Czech Rally Championship results ===
| Year | Entrant | Car | 1 | 2 | 3 | 4 | 5 | 6 | 7 | 8 | 9 | 10 | 11 | MMČR | Points |
|---|---|---|---|---|---|---|---|---|---|---|---|---|---|---|---|
| 1999 | Jaromír Tarabus | Škoda Favorit 136L | ŠUM | LIB | ÚSL | KRU | VYŠ | BOH | BAR; Ret | AGR | VAL | HOR | PŘÍ | - | 0 |
| 2001 | AK Saco Motorsport | Honda Civic VTi | ŠUM | VAL | KRU | BOH | BAR; 29 | PŘÍ | TŘE | | | | | - | 0 |
| 2002 | Motocar Sport-Club | Honda Civic VTi | ŠUM; 18 | VAL; 38 | KRU; Ret | BOH; 40 | BAR; Ret | PŘÍ; 27 | TŘE; 24 | | | | | (2ndN2) | 0 |
| 2003 | AK Rallysport Příluky | Honda Civic VTi | ŠUM; 26 | VAL; 25 | KRU; 38 | BOH; 37 | BAR; 21 | PŘÍ; 32 | TŘE; 25 | | | | | (1stN2) | 0 |
| 2004 | AK Rallysport Příluky | Honda Civic VTi | JÄN | ŠUM; 29 | TAT; 34 | KRU; 26 | BOH; 54 | BAR; 22 | PŘÍ; Ret | TŘE; Ret | | | | (3rdN) | 0 |
| 2005 | AK Rallysport Příluky | Honda Civic VTi | JÄN | ŠUM; 22 | VAL; 38 | TAT; 30 | KRU; 16 | BOH; 29 | BAR; 24 | PŘÍ; 40 | TŘE | | | 45 (1stN) | 4 |
| 2006 | AK Rallysport Příluky | Honda Civic VTi | JÄN; 18 | ŠUM; 17 | TAT; 23 | KRU; 17 | BOH; 26 | BAR; 22 | | | | | | (1stN) | 22(10thA) |
| 2006 | AK Rallysport Příluky | Suzuki Ignis S1600 | | | | | | | TŘE; 7 | PŘÍ | | | | (1stN) | 22(10thA) |
| 2007 | AK Rallysport Příluky | Suzuki Ignis S1600 | JÄN; 11 | ŠUM; Ret | KRU; 11 | BOH; 5 | | | | | | | | 10 (2ndA) | 31 |
| 2007 | AK Rallysport Příluky | Suzuki Swift S1600 | | | | | HOR; 7 | BAR; Ret | PŘÍ | | | | | 10 (2ndA) | 31 |
| 2008 | AK Rallysport Brno o.s. | Fiat Abarth Grande Punto S2000 | JÄN; Ret | VAL; 11 | ŠUM | KRU | HUS | TŘE; 6 | BOH; 3 | BAR; Ret | PŘÍ; Ret | | | 10th | 44 |
| 2009 | AK Rallysport Brno o.s. | Fiat Abarth Grande Punto S2000 | VAL; 19 | ŠUM; 5 | KRU; 3 | HUS; Ret | BAR; Ret | PŘÍ; 2 | BOH; 4 | | | | | 5th | 90 |
| 2010 | Czech Ford Rally Team | Ford Fiesta S2000 | VAL; 3 | ŠUM; 3 | KRU; 4 | HUS; 4 | | BAR; 3 | PŘÍ; 1 | | | | | 3rd | 103 |
| 2010 | Czech Ford Rally Team | Škoda Fabia S2000 | | | | | BOH; 5 | | | | | | | 3rd | 103 |
| 2011 | Impromat Motorsport | Škoda Fabia R2 | VAL; Ret | ŠUM | KRU | HUS | BOH; 5 | | | | | | | 16th | 21 |
| 2011 | AK Rallysport Brno o.s. | Mitsubishi Lancer Evo IX | | | | | | BAR; 9 | PŘÍ | | | | | 16th | 21 |
| 2012 | AK Rallysport Brno o.s. | Škoda Fabia S2000 | JÄN | VAL; 4 | ŠUM; 3 | KRU; 4 | HUS; 3 | BOH - | BAR; 3 | PŘÍ; 1 | | | | 3rd | 172 |
| 2013 | AK Rallysport Brno o.s. | Škoda Fabia S2000 | JÄN; 4 | ŠUM; 2 | KRU; 3 | HUS; 3 | BOH; 4 | BAR; 3 | PŘÍ - | | | | | 3rd | 238 |
| 2014 | Czech National Team | Škoda Fabia R5 | JÄN; 2 | KRU | ŠUM | HUS | BOH | BAR; 4 | PŘÍ | | | | | 6th | 110 |
| 2015 | T&T Czech National Team | Škoda Fabia S2000 | ŠUM | KRU | HUS; Ret | BOH | | | | | | | | 17th | 23 |
| 2015 | T&T Czech National Team | Škoda Fabia R5 | | | | | BAR; Ret | KLA | | | | | | 17th | 23 |
| 2016 | T&T Czech National Team | Škoda Fabia R5 | ŠUM | KRU | HUS | BOH | BAR; Ret | PŘÍ | | | | | | 6th | 129 |
| 2017 | Jaromír Tarabus | Škoda Fabia S2000 | VAL; 9 | ŠUM; 6 | KRU; 8 | HUS; 9 | BOH; 9 | BAR; 7 | PŘÍ; 4 | | | | | 8th | 93 |
| 2018 | Jaromír Tarabus | Škoda Fabia R5 | VAL; 5 | ŠUM; 5 | KRU | HUS; 4 | BOH | BAR; 4 | PŘÍ | | | | | 7th | 110 |

=== Czech Sprintrally Championship results ===
| Year | Entrant | Car | 1 | 2 | 3 | 4 | 5 | 6 | 7 | 8 | MČR-S | Points |
|---|---|---|---|---|---|---|---|---|---|---|---|---|
| 1998 | Motorsport Klub MTK | Škoda Favorit 136L | KOP; 22 | | | | | | | | - | - |
| 1999 | AK Taol Zlín | Nissan Micra | KOP; 19 | | | | | | | | - | - |
| 2000 | Rally Team Zlín | Nissan Micra | VYS; 26 | AKU; 25 | HOR; 37 | VAL; 30 | KOP; 26 | | | | 1stN1 | 0 |
| 2001 | Motocarsport Zádveřice | Honda Civic VTi | OKR; 21 | BRN; 30 | PAC; 24 | VYS; 25 | KOP; 17 | SOS; 20 | | | 1stN2 | 0 |
| 2003 | AK Rallysport Příluky | Škoda Favorit 136L | KOP; Ret | | | | | | | | - | 0 |
| 2005 | AK Rallysport Příluky | Honda Civic VTi | KOP; 27 | VSE; 25 | | | | | | | - | - |
| 2006 | AK Rallysport Příluky | Suzuki Ignis S1600 | KOP; 9 | VSE; 9 | | | | | | | 22nd | 17 |
| 2008 | AK Rallysport Brno o.s. | Fiat Abarth Grande Punto S2000 | KOP; 2 | | | | | | | | - | - |
| 2009 | AK Rallysport Brno o.s. | Fiat Abarth Grande Punto S2000 | KOP; 1 | | | | | | | | - | - |
| 2010 | AK Rallysport Brno o.s. | Ford Fiesta S2000 | KOP; 2 | | | | | | | | - | - |
| 2011 | AK Rallysport Brno o.s. | Fiat Abarth Grande Punto S2000 | LUZ; 5 | KOP; 3 | KRK; R | VYS; R | PAC; 8 | TŘE; 3 | JES; R | VSE; 6 | 5th | 86 |
| 2012 | AK Rallysport Brno o.s. | Škoda Fabia S2000 | KOP; 4 (1st2) | | | | | | | | - | - |
| 2013 | AK Rallysport Brno o.s. | Škoda Fabia S2000 | KOP; 2 (1st2) | | | | | | | | - | - |
