= 2015 Rally Liepāja =

Rally competition held in Latvia

2015 Rally Liepāja Rally Liepāja 2015
Round 2 of 10 of the 2015 European Rally Championship
← Previous event	Next event →
- Host country: Latvia
- Rally base: Liepāja
- Dates run: 6 – 8 February 2015
- Stages: 12 (207.13 km; 128.70 miles)
- Stage surface: Snow
- Overall distance: 836.72 km (519.91 miles)

Statistics
- Crews: 50 at start, 30 at finish

Overall results
- Overall winner: (Republic of Ireland) Craig Breen; Peugeot Rally Academy

The 2015 Rally Liepāja was the second round of the 2015 European Rally Championship season, held in Latvia between 6–8 February 2015.

The rally was won by Craig Breen and Scott Martin.

== Results ==
Pos	No	Driver	Co-driver	Entrant	Car	Time	Points
1	4	(Republic of Ireland) Craig Breen	(United Kingdom) Scott Martin	Peugeot Rally Academy	Peugeot 208 T16	1:56:49.1	37
2	18	(Estonia) Siim Plangi	(Estonia) Marek Sarapuu	Autostils Rally Technica	Mitsubishi Lancer Evolution X	1:58:29.8	28
3	19	(Lithuania) Dominykas Butvilas	(Poland) Kamil Heller	Subaru Poland Rally Team	Subaru Impreza WRX STI	2:02:37.7	23
4	22	(Latvia) Mārtiņš Svilis	(Latvia) Ivo Pūķis	SKN Sports	Ford Fiesta R5	2:03:28.3	15
5	2	(France) Robert Consani	(France) Maxime Vilmot	Delta Rally	Peugeot 207 S2000	2:03:40.6	12
6	34	(Sweden) Emil Bergkvist	(Sweden) Joakim Sjöberg	ADAC Opel Rallye Junior Team	Opel Adam R2	2:04:19.0	12
7	20	(Latvia) Jãnis Vorobjovs	(Latvia) Andris Mãlnieks	Vorobjovs Racing	Mitsubishi Lancer Evolution X	2:04:47.1	6
8	28	(Norway) Steve Røkland	(United Kingdom) James Aldridge	Steve Røkland Motorsport	Peugeot 208 R2	2:04:49.1	5
9	30	(Latvia) Ralfs Sirmacis	(Latvia) Arturs Šimins	Sports Racing Technologies	Peugeot 208 R2	2:04:58.2	2
10	7	(Estonia) Raul Jeets	(Estonia) Andrus Toom	MM Motorsport	Ford Fiesta R5	2:05:25.1	1

== Standings after the rally ==
Drivers
Pos	Driver	Points
1	(Poland) Kajetan Kajetanowicz	45
2	(Republic of Ireland) Craig Breen	40
3	(France) Robert Consani	40
4	(Belarus) Alexey Lukyanuk	32
5	(Estonia) Siim Plangi	28

ERC-2
Pos	Driver	Points
1	(Hungary) Dávid Botka	44
2	(Czech Republic) Vojtěch Štajf	42
3	(Estonia) Siim Plangi	39
4	(Lithuania) Dominykas Butvilas	30
5	(Latvia) Mārtiņš Svilis	25

ERC-3
Pos	Driver	Points
1	(Sweden) Emil Bergkvist	39
2	(Poland) Slawomir Ogryzek	39
3	(Italy) Simone Tempestini	30
4	(Norway) Steve Rokland	29
5	(Hungary) Kristóf Klausz	25

ERC Junior
Pos	Driver	Points
1	(Sweden) Emil Bergkvist	39
2	(Norway) Steve Rokland	29
3	(Latvia) Ralfs Sirmacis	24
4	(Sweden) Mattias Adielsson	21
5	(United Kingdom) Jon Armstrong	15
