= 2014 European Rally Championship =

Seasons
- ← 2013 2015 →

The 2014 European Rally Championship season was the 62nd season of the FIA European Rally Championship, the European continental championship series in rallying. The season was also the second following the merger between the European Rally Championship and the Intercontinental Rally Challenge.

The season started in Austria on January 3, with the Internationale Jänner Rallye and finished in November 8 in Tour de Corse. Esapekka Lappi (Škoda Fabia S2000) was the 2014 European Champion.

In addition to the championship title, the series introduced three additional trophies, with one for each surface type. The "Ice Master" trophy was awarded to the driver who scores the most points on snow events, while the "Gravel Master" trophy was presented to the driver who scores the most points on gravel rallies, and the driver who scores the most points on tarmac events won the "Asphalt Master" trophy.

For the Ice Master were accounted the result of winter rallies in Austria and Latvia. The Gravel Masters was composed by Acropolis (2nd sector only), Azores, Estonia and Cyprus while the Asphalt Master was contested in Acropolis (1st sector only), Ireland, Ypres, the Czech Republic, Valais and Corsica.

== Calendar ==
The calendar for the 2014 season initially featured twelve rallies.

Round	Dates	Rally name	Surface	Mini-Series
1	3–5 January	(Austria) Internationale Jänner Rallye	Mixed	Ice Master
2	31 January–2 February	(Latvia) Rally Liepāja–Ventspils	Mixed	Ice Master
3	28–30 March	(Greece) Acropolis Rally	Mixed	Gravel Master
4	17–19 April	(Northern Ireland) / (Republic of Ireland) Circuit of Ireland	Tarmac	Asphalt Master
5	15–17 May	(Portugal) Rallye Açores	Gravel	Gravel Master
6	19–21 June	(Belgium) Ypres Rally	Tarmac	Asphalt Master
7	17–19 July	Rally Estonia	Gravel	Gravel Master
8	29–31 August	(Czech Republic) Barum Czech Rally Zlín	Tarmac	Asphalt Master
9	19–21 September	Cyprus Rally	Mixed	Gravel Master
10	9–11 October^{1}	Sibiu Rally Romania	Gravel	Gravel Master
11	23–25 October	(Switzerland) Rallye International du Valais	Mixed	Asphalt Master
12	6–8 November	(France) Tour de Corse	Tarmac	Asphalt Master

Notes:

- ^1 – Sibiu Rally Romania was supposed to be run in late February, but was postponed due to the weather conditions for October, and later was cancelled.

=== Calendar Changes ===
- The 2014 European Rally Championship saw the addition of the Acropolis Rally, recently dropped from the 2014 World Rally Championship season in favour of the Rally Poland.
- The Sibiu Rally Romania was originally to be run in February, to become the third and final event in the newly created Winter Challenge mini-series. However, bad weather conditions in the country and the roads being inaccessible caused the rally to be postponed in October as a fully gravel event. Later, the rally was cancelled.
- The Tour de Corse changed its date, and became the season finale.
- The Rally Islas Canarias El Corte Inglés, the Croatia Rally and the Rallye Sanremo were dropped from the championship.

== Selected entries ==
Icon	Cup
L	Ladies Trophy
J	ERC Junior Cup
2WD	ERC 2WD Cup
P	ERC Production Cup

Notable entry list
Constructor	Car	Team	Driver	Co-driver	Rounds
Ford	Ford Fiesta RRC	(United Kingdom) RK M-Sport World Rally Team	(Poland) Robert Kubica	(Poland) Maciek Szczepaniak	1
Ford	Ford Fiesta RRC	(United Kingdom) Autotek Motorsport	(Qatar) Nasser Al-Attiyah	(Italy) Giovanni Bernacchini	9
Ford	Ford Fiesta RRC	(Saudi Arabia) Yazeed Racing	(Saudi Arabia) Yazeed Al Rajhi	(United Kingdom) Michael Orr	9
Ford	Ford Fiesta RRC	(Italy) GP Racing Team	(France) Bryan Bouffier	(France) Xavier Panseri	11
Ford	Ford Fiesta RRC	(Belgium) First Motorsport	(France) Stéphane Sarrazin	(France) Jacques-Julien Renucci	11
Ford	Ford Fiesta S2000	(Latvia) Sport Racing Technologies	(Russia) Vasiliy Gryazin	(Russia) Dmitry Chumak	1–2
Ford	Ford Fiesta R5	(Poland) Lotos Rally Team	(Poland) Kajetan Kajetanowicz	(Poland) Jarosław Baran	1–3, 5, 8–11
Ford	Ford Fiesta R5	(Estonia) MM Motorsport	(Estonia) Ott Tänak	(Estonia) Raigo Mõlder	7
Peugeot	Peugeot 207 S2000	(Austria) Stohl Racing	(Austria) Andreas Aigner	(Austria) Barbara Watzl	1
Peugeot	Peugeot 207 S2000	(Italy) Delta Rally	(France) Robert Consani	(France) Vincent Landais	1–4
Peugeot	Peugeot 207 S2000	(Italy) Delta Rally	(Portugal) Bruno Magalhães	(Portugal) Carlos Magalhães	3, 5–6
Peugeot	Peugeot 207 S2000	(France) Peugeot Rally Academy	(Republic of Ireland) Craig Breen	(United Kingdom) Scott Martin	2
Peugeot	Peugeot 208 T16 R5	(France) Peugeot Rally Academy	(Republic of Ireland) Craig Breen	(United Kingdom) Scott Martin	3–6, 8–11
Peugeot	Peugeot 208 T16 R5	(France) Peugeot Rally Academy	(Netherlands) Kevin Abbring	(United Kingdom) Sebastian Marshall	3–6, 8, 10–11
Peugeot	Peugeot 208 T16 R5	(Italy) Delta Rally	(Portugal) Bruno Magalhães	(Portugal) Carlos Magalhães	8–11
Mini	Mini John Cooper Works S2000	(Czech Republic) EuroOil Invelt Team	(Czech Republic) Václav Pech	(Czech Republic) Petr Uhel	1, 8
Škoda	Škoda Fabia S2000	(Czech Republic) Czech National Team	(Czech Republic) Jaromír Tarabus	(Czech Republic) Daniel Trunkát	1–3, 7–8, 11
Škoda	Škoda Fabia S2000	(Czech Republic) Škoda Motorsport	(Finland) Esapekka Lappi	(Finland) Janne Ferm	2–4, 6–8, 10–11
Škoda	Škoda Fabia S2000	(Czech Republic) Škoda Motorsport	(Germany) Sepp Wiegand	(Germany) Frank Christian	2–4, 6–8, 10–11
Škoda	Škoda Fabia S2000	(United Kingdom) Simpsons Škoda	(United Kingdom) Neil Simpson	(United Kingdom) Claire Mole	4, 6, 8
Škoda	Škoda Fabia S2000	(United Kingdom) Simpsons Škoda	(United Kingdom) Neil Simpson	(United Kingdom) Elliott Edmondson	10
Škoda	Škoda Fabia S2000	(Italy) DP Autosport	(Italy) Luca Rossetti	(Italy) Matteo Chiarcossi	6
Škoda	Škoda Fabia S2000	(Belgium) Autostal Duindistel	(Belgium) Freddy Loix	(Belgium) Johan Gitsels	6
Citroën	Citroën DS3 RRC	(France) PH Sport	(France) Bryan Bouffier	(France) Xavier Panseri	2–3
Citroën	Citroën DS3 RRC	(France) Abu Dhabi Racing	(United Arab Emirates) Khalid Al Qassimi	(United Kingdom) Chris Patterson	9
Citroën	Citroën DS3 R5	(Belgium) Top Teams by MY Racing	(France) Sébastien Chardonnet	(France) Thibault de la Haye	7

Full entry list
Constructor	Car	Team	Driver	Co-driver	Cup	Rounds
Ford	Ford Fiesta RRC	(United Kingdom) RK M-Sport World Rally Team	(Poland) Robert Kubica	(Poland) Maciek Szczepaniak		1
Ford	Ford Fiesta RRC	(Republic of Ireland) Keltech Motorsport	(Republic of Ireland) Sam Moffett	(Republic of Ireland) James O'Reilly		4
Ford	Ford Fiesta RRC	(Ukraine) AT Rally Team	(Portugal) Bernardo Sousa	(Portugal) Hugo Magalhães		5
Ford	Ford Fiesta RRC	(United Kingdom) Autotek Motorsport	(Qatar) Nasser Al-Attiyah	(Italy) Giovanni Bernacchini		9
Ford	Ford Fiesta RRC	(Saudi Arabia) Yazeed Racing	(Saudi Arabia) Yazeed Al Rajhi	(United Kingdom) Michael Orr		9
Ford	Ford Fiesta RRC	(Germany) Puma Rally Team	(Qatar) Abdulaziz Al-Kuwari	(Republic of Ireland) Killian Duffy		9
Ford	Ford Fiesta RRC	(Italy) GP Racing Team	(France) Bryan Bouffier	(France) Xavier Panseri		11
Ford	Ford Fiesta RRC	(Belgium) First Motorsport	(France) Stéphane Sarrazin	(France) Jacques-Julien Renucci		11
Ford	Ford Fiesta S2000	(Latvia) Sport Racing Technologies	(Russia) Vasiliy Gryazin	(Russia) Dmitry Chumak		1–2
Ford	Ford Fiesta S2000	(Latvia) Sport Racing Technologies	(Russia) Vasiliy Gryazin	(Russia) Dmitry Eremeev		3, 5–6
Ford	Ford Fiesta S2000	(Ukraine) AT Rally Team	(Ukraine) Oleksiy Tamrazov	(Ukraine) Andriy Nikolaiev		2
Ford	Ford Fiesta S2000	(Ukraine) AT Rally Team	(Estonia) Martin Kangur	(Estonia) Andres Ots		7
Ford	Ford Fiesta S2000	(Netherlands) Kobus Tuning Rally Team	(Netherlands) Hermen Kobus	(Netherlands) Erik de Wild		6
Ford	Ford Fiesta R5	(Poland) Lotos Rally Team	(Poland) Kajetan Kajetanowicz	(Poland) Jarosław Baran		1–3, 5, 8–11
Ford	Ford Fiesta R5	(Czech Republic) Delimax Team	(Czech Republic) Pavel Valoušek	(Czech Republic) Martina Škardová		1
Ford	Ford Fiesta R5	(Czech Republic) TRT Czech Rally Sport	(Czech Republic) Roman Odložilík	(Czech Republic) Martin Tureček		1, 8
Ford	Ford Fiesta R5	(Romania) Napoca Rally Academy	(Italy) Marco Tempestini	(Italy) Lucio Baggio		2
Ford	Ford Fiesta R5	(Romania) Napoca Rally Academy	(Italy) Marco Tempestini	(Italy) Nicola Arena		7
Ford	Ford Fiesta R5	(Estonia) MM Motorsport	(Estonia) Timmu Kõrge	(Estonia) Erki Pints		2, 7
Ford	Ford Fiesta R5	(Estonia) MM Motorsport	(Estonia) Raul Jeets	(Estonia) Andrus Toom		2, 7
Ford	Ford Fiesta R5	(Estonia) MM Motorsport	(Estonia) Ott Tänak	(Estonia) Raigo Mõlder		7
Ford	Ford Fiesta R5	(Belgium) J-Motorsport	(Greece) Jourdan Serderidis	(Belgium) Frédéric Miclotte		3
Ford	Ford Fiesta R5	(United Kingdom) CA1 Sport Ltd	(Republic of Ireland) Robert Barrable	(United Kingdom) Stuart Loudon		4, 8
Ford	Ford Fiesta R5	(Portugal) ARC Sport	(Portugal) Ricardo Moura	(Portugal) Sancho Eiró		5
Ford	Ford Fiesta R5	(Portugal) ARC Sport	(Portugal) Diogo Salvi	(Portugal) Paulo Babo		5
Ford	Ford Fiesta R5	(Portugal) P&B Racing	(Portugal) João Barros	(Portugal) Jorge Henriques		5
Ford	Ford Fiesta R5	(Spain) ACSM Rallye Team	(Spain) Xavier Pons	(Spain) Álex Haro		6
Ford	Ford Fiesta R5	(Belgium) Autostal Duindistel	(Belgium) Bernd Casier	(Belgium) Pieter Vyncke		6
Ford	Ford Fiesta R5	(Belgium) Autostal Duindistel	(Belgium) Philip Cracco	(Belgium) Wim Soenens		6
Ford	Ford Fiesta R5	(Belgium) Royale Ecurie Ardennes	(Belgium) Cédric Cherain	(Belgium) André Leyh		6
Ford	Ford Fiesta R5	(Belgium) Autostal Atlantic	(Belgium) Didier Duquesne	(Belgium) Filip Cuvelier		6
Ford	Ford Fiesta R5	(United Kingdom) Drive DMACK	(Finland) Kristian Sohlberg	(Finland) Peter Flythström		7
Ford	Ford Fiesta R5	(United Kingdom) Drive DMACK	(Estonia) Ott Tänak	(Estonia) Raigo Mõlder		8
Ford	Ford Fiesta R5	(Poland) C-Rally	(Poland) Jarosław Kołtun	(Poland) Ireneusz Pleskot		7
Ford	Ford Fiesta R5	(Poland) C-Rally	(Poland) Tomasz Kasperczyk	(Poland) Damian Syty		7
Ford	Ford Fiesta R5	(Slovakia) Rufa Sport	(Czech Republic) Tomáš Kostka	(Czech Republic) Miroslav Houšť		8
Ford	Ford Fiesta R5	(Qatar) Qafac Rally Team	(Qatar) Abdullah Al-Kuwari	(Italy) Nicola Arena		9
Ford	Ford Fiesta R5	(Switzerland) D-Max Swiss	(Switzerland) Olivier Burri	(France) Jean-Jacques Ferrero		10
Ford	Ford Fiesta R5	(Switzerland) Lugano Racing Team	(Belgium) Jean-Philippe Radoux	(Belgium) Jean-Noël Gregoire		10
Ford	Ford Fiesta R5	(France) Team 2B Yacco	(France) Julien Maurin	(France) Nicolas Klinger		11
Ford	Ford Fiesta R5	(Belgium) J-Motorsport	(France) Jean-Mathieu Leandri	(France) Fabrice Gordon		11
Peugeot	Peugeot 207 S2000	(Austria) Stohl Racing	(Austria) Andreas Aigner	(Austria) Barbara Watzl		1
Peugeot	Peugeot 207 S2000	(Italy) Delta Rally	(France) Robert Consani	(France) Vincent Landais		1–4
Peugeot	Peugeot 207 S2000	(Italy) Delta Rally	(France) Robert Consani	(France) Maxime Vilmot		5–11
Peugeot	Peugeot 207 S2000	(Italy) Delta Rally	(France) Jean-Michel Raoux	(France) Sabrina de Castelli		1
Peugeot	Peugeot 207 S2000	(Italy) Delta Rally	(France) Jean-Michel Raoux	(France) Laurent Magat		2
Peugeot	Peugeot 207 S2000	(Italy) Delta Rally	(Portugal) Bruno Magalhães	(Portugal) Carlos Magalhães		3, 5–6
Peugeot	Peugeot 207 S2000	(Italy) Delta Rally	(Italy) Giacomo Costenaro	(Italy) Justin Bardini		3, 5
Peugeot	Peugeot 207 S2000	(France) Peugeot Rally Academy	(Republic of Ireland) Craig Breen	(United Kingdom) Scott Martin		2
Peugeot	Peugeot 207 S2000	(Italy) Munaretto Sport	(France) Jean-Michel Raoux	(France) Laurent Magat		3, 5
Peugeot	Peugeot 207 S2000	(Hungary) Tagai Racing Technology	(Hungary) László Vizin	(Hungary) Gábor Zsíros		4, 6, 9–10
Peugeot	Peugeot 207 S2000	(Belgium) Autostal Duindistel	(Belgium) Davy Vanneste	(Belgium) Eddy Snaet		6
Peugeot	Peugeot 207 S2000	(Belgium) Autostal Duindistel	(Belgium) Melisa Debackere	(Belgium) Cindy Cokelaere	L	6
Peugeot	Peugeot 207 S2000	(Russia) TAIF Rally Team	(Russia) Radik Shaymiev	(Russia) Maxim Tsvetkov		7
Peugeot	Peugeot 207 S2000	(Switzerland) D-Max Swiss	(Switzerland) Sébastien Carron	(Switzerland) Lucien Revaz		10
Peugeot	Peugeot 207 S2000	(France) Rally Jeunes FFSA	(France) Eric Camilli	(France) Benjamin Veillas		11
Peugeot	Peugeot 208 T16 R5	(France) Peugeot Rally Academy	(Republic of Ireland) Craig Breen	(United Kingdom) Scott Martin		3–6, 8–11
Peugeot	Peugeot 208 T16 R5	(France) Peugeot Rally Academy	(Netherlands) Kevin Abbring	(United Kingdom) Sebastian Marshall		3–6, 8, 10–11
Peugeot	Peugeot 208 T16 R5	(France) Peugeot Rally Academy	(Estonia) Siim Plangi	(Estonia) Marek Sarapuu		7
Peugeot	Peugeot 208 T16 R5	Peugeot Belgium Luxembourg	(Belgium) Pieter Tsjoen	(Belgium) Eddy Chevaillier		6
Peugeot	Peugeot 208 T16 R5	(Estonia) ME3 Rally Team	(Estonia) Karl Kruuda	(Estonia) Martin Järveoja		7
Peugeot	Peugeot 208 T16 R5	(Italy) Munaretto Sport	(France) Jean-Michel Raoux	(France) Laurent Magat		7
Peugeot	Peugeot 208 T16 R5	(Italy) Delta Rally	(Portugal) Bruno Magalhães	(Portugal) Carlos Magalhães		8–11
Peugeot	Peugeot 208 T16 R5	(France) HRT Rally Team	(Switzerland) Jonathan Hirschi	(France) Vincent Randais		10–11
Peugeot	Peugeot 208 R2	Peugeot Sport Slovenia	(Slovenia) Rok Turk	(Slovenia) Enej Loznar	2WD	1
Peugeot	Peugeot 208 R2	(Czech Republic) Czech National Team	(Czech Republic) Jan Černý	(Czech Republic) Pavel Kohout	2WD J	2, 4–6, 8
Peugeot	Peugeot 208 R2	(France) Peugeot Rally Academy	(France) Stéphane Lefebvre	(France) Thomas Dubois	2WD J	2, 5–6, 8, 11
Peugeot	Peugeot 208 R2	(France) Peugeot Rally Academy	(France) Jean-Mathieu Leandri	(France) Maxime Vilmot	2WD J	2
Peugeot	Peugeot 208 R2	(Romania) Napoca Rally Academy	(Italy) Andrea Crugnola	(Italy) Michele Ferrara	2WD J	2, 4–6, 8, 10–11
Peugeot	Peugeot 208 R2	(Poland) MSZ Racing	(Poland) Aleks Zawada	(France) Cathy Derousseaux	2WD J	2, 4–6, 8, 10–11
Peugeot	Peugeot 208 R2	(Italy) ACI Team Italia	(Italy) Fabrizio Andolfi	(Italy) Andrea Casalini	2WD J	2
Peugeot	Peugeot 208 R2	(Italy) ACI Team Italia	(Italy) Fabio Andolfi	(Italy) Simone Scattolin	2WD J	5–8, 10–11
Peugeot	Peugeot 208 R2	Peugeot Belgium Luxembourg	(Belgium) Gino Bux	(Belgium) Eric Borguet	2WD J	4–6, 8, 11
Peugeot	Peugeot 208 R2	(United Kingdom) Peugeot UK	(United Kingdom) Chris Ingram	(France) Gabin Moreau	2WD J	8, 10
Mini	Mini John Cooper Works S2000	(Czech Republic) EuroOil Invelt Team	(Czech Republic) Václav Pech	(Czech Republic) Petr Uhel		1, 8
Škoda	Škoda Fabia S2000	(Austria) BRR Baumschlager Rallye & Racing	(Austria) Raimund Baumschlager	(Germany) Klaus Wicha		1
Škoda	Škoda Fabia S2000	(Austria) BRR Baumschlager Rallye & Racing	(South Africa) Henk Lategan	(Germany) Klaus Wicha		3
Škoda	Škoda Fabia S2000	(Czech Republic) GPD Mit Metal Racing Team	(Czech Republic) Antonín Tlusťák	(Czech Republic) Ladislav Kučera		1, 8, 10–11
Škoda	Škoda Fabia S2000	(Czech Republic) GPD Mit Metal Racing Team	(Czech Republic) Antonín Tlusťák	(Czech Republic) Jan Škaloud		2–3, 5–6, 9
Škoda	Škoda Fabia S2000	(Czech Republic) GPD Mit Metal Racing Team	(Czech Republic) Jaroslav Orsák	(Czech Republic) David Šmeidler		2–3, 5–6, 8–10
Škoda	Škoda Fabia S2000	(Czech Republic) GPD Mit Metal Racing Team	(Czech Republic) Tomáš Kurka	(Czech Republic) Karel Vajík		8, 10
Škoda	Škoda Fabia S2000	(Czech Republic) Czech National Team	(Czech Republic) Jaromír Tarabus	(Czech Republic) Daniel Trunkát		1–3, 7–8, 11
Škoda	Škoda Fabia S2000	(Czech Republic) Škoda Motorsport	(Finland) Esapekka Lappi	(Finland) Janne Ferm		2–4, 6–8, 10–11
Škoda	Škoda Fabia S2000	(Czech Republic) Škoda Motorsport	(Germany) Sepp Wiegand	(Germany) Frank Christian		2–4, 6–8, 10–11
Škoda	Škoda Fabia S2000	(Romania) Napoca Rally Academy	(Italy) Simone Tempestini	(Romania) Dorin Pulpea		2
Škoda	Škoda Fabia S2000	(United Kingdom) Simpsons Škoda	(United Kingdom) Neil Simpson	(United Kingdom) Claire Mole		4, 6, 8
Škoda	Škoda Fabia S2000	(United Kingdom) Simpsons Škoda	(United Kingdom) Neil Simpson	(United Kingdom) Elliott Edmondson		10
Škoda	Škoda Fabia S2000	(Portugal) Škoda Bank	(Portugal) Pedro Meireles	(Portugal) Mário Castro		5
Škoda	Škoda Fabia S2000	(Italy) DP Autosport	(Italy) Luca Rossetti	(Italy) Matteo Chiarcossi		6
Škoda	Škoda Fabia S2000	(Belgium) Autostal Duindistel	(Belgium) Freddy Loix	(Belgium) Johan Gitsels		6
Škoda	Škoda Fabia S2000	(Czech Republic) Adell Mogul Racing Team	(Czech Republic) Roman Kresta	(Czech Republic) Petr Starý		8
Škoda	Škoda Fabia S2000	(Slovakia) CMM-Media Sport	(Czech Republic) Pavel Valoušek	(Czech Republic) Martina Škardová		8
Škoda	Škoda Fabia S2000	(Switzerland) Lugano Racing Team	(Switzerland) Nicolas Althaus	(Switzerland) Alain Ioset		10
Škoda	Škoda Fabia S2000	(Switzerland) Lugano Racing Team	(Switzerland) Pascal Perroud	(Switzerland) Quentin Marchand		10
Škoda	Škoda Fabia S2000	Eurosol Racing Team Hungary	(Hungary) János Puskádi	(Hungary) Barnabás Gódor		11
Subaru	Subaru Impreza WRX STi R4	(Romania) Napoca Rally Academy	(Italy) Simone Tempestini	(Romania) Dorin Pulpea	P	1
Subaru	Subaru Impreza WRX STi R4	(Austria) Stohl Racing	(Austria) Hermann Neubauer	(Austria) Bernhard Ettel	P	1–2
Subaru	Subaru Impreza WRX STi R4	(Portugal) ARC Sport	(Portugal) Adruzilo Lopes	(Portugal) Tiago Azevedo	P	5
Subaru	Subaru Impreza WRX STi R4	(Finland) Jan Dohmen Rally Team	(Netherlands) Kees Burger	(Finland) Mikko Lukka	P	7
Subaru	Subaru Impreza WRX STi R4	(Italy) Top Run SRL	(Cyprus) Kyriakos Kyriakou	(Cyprus) Christos Aristidou	P	9
Subaru	Subaru Impreza WRX STi R4	(Switzerland) Lugano Racing Team	(Switzerland) Florian Gonon	(Luxembourg) Michel Horgnies	P	10
Subaru	Subaru Impreza WRX STi	(Czech Republic) Subaru Czech Duck Racing	(Czech Republic) Jan Černý	(Czech Republic) Pavel Kohout	P	1
Subaru	Subaru Impreza WRX STi	(Romania) Napoca Rally Academy	(Bulgaria) Ekaterina Stratieva	(Romania) Carmen Poenaru	L P	2–3
Subaru	Subaru Impreza WRX STi	(United Kingdom) JRM Engineering	(United Kingdom) Mark Higgins	(United Kingdom) Carl Williamson	P	6, 8, 10
Subaru	Subaru Impreza WRX STi	(United Kingdom) JRM Engineering	(Republic of Ireland) Keith Cronin	(United Kingdom) Marshall Clarke	P	11
Subaru	Subaru Impreza WRX STi	(Switzerland) Lugano Racing Team	(Switzerland) Urs Hunziker	(Germany) Mélanie Wahl	P	10
Subaru	Subaru Impreza WRX STi	(Switzerland) Lugano Racing Team	(Switzerland) Willian Winiger	(Switzerland) Sophie Barras	P	10
Mitsubishi	Mitsubishi Lancer Evo IX R4	(Austria) DiTech Racing Team	(Austria) Beppo Harrach	(Austria) Leopold Welsersheimb	P	1
Mitsubishi	Mitsubishi Lancer Evo IX R4	(Hungary) Arrabona Rally Club	(Hungary) Kornéi Lukács	(Hungary) Márk Mesterházi	P	2
Mitsubishi	Mitsubishi Lancer Evo IX R4	(Portugal) ACB Racing	(Portugal) Ruben Rodrigues	(Portugal) Estevão Rodrigues	P	5
Mitsubishi	Mitsubishi Lancer Evo IX R4	(Czech Republic) GPD Mit Metal Racing Team (rally driver)|	(Czech Republic) Martin Hudec	(Czech Republic) Petr Picka	P	6, 8, 11
Mitsubishi	Mitsubishi Lancer Evo IX R4	(Italy) Island Motorsport	(Italy) Marco Cavigioli	(Italy) Monica Fortunato	P	8
Mitsubishi	Mitsubishi Lancer Evo IX R4	(Hungary) Topp Auto 2010 Kft.	(Hungary) Péter Ranga	(Hungary) Janek Czakó	P	9
Mitsubishi	Mitsubishi Lancer Evo X R4	(Lithuania) The Boar – Proracing	(Ukraine) Vitaliy Pushkar	(Ukraine) Ivan Mishyn	P	1–3, 5–11
Mitsubishi	Mitsubishi Lancer Evo X R4	(Lithuania) Juta Racing	(Lithuania) Vytautas Švedas	(Lithuania) Žilvinas Sakalauskas	P	2
Mitsubishi	Mitsubishi Lancer Evo X R4	(Finland) Printsport Racing	(Ukraine) Inessa Tushkanova	(Estonia) Sergei Larens	L P	2
Mitsubishi	Mitsubishi Lancer Evo X R4	(Belgium) Andy Lefevere Rallysport	(Belgium) Andy Lefevere	(Belgium) Andy Vangheluwe	P	6
Mitsubishi	Mitsubishi Lancer Evo X R4	(Switzerland) Ecurie Basilisk	(Switzerland) Ruedi Schmidlin	(Switzerland) Erich Götte	P	10
Mitsubishi	Mitsubishi Lancer Evo X R4	(Hungary) Érdi Team Kft.	(Hungary) Tibor Érdi	(Hungary) Attila Táborszki	P	11
Mitsubishi	Mitsubishi Lancer Evo IX	(Czech Republic) GPD Mit Metal Racing Team	(Czech Republic) Martin Hudec	(Czech Republic) Petr Picka	P	1–3, 5, 9–10
Mitsubishi	Mitsubishi Lancer Evo IX	(Hungary) Érdi Team Kft.	(Hungary) Tibor Érdi	(Hungary) Attila Táborszki	P	3, 6
Mitsubishi	Mitsubishi Lancer Evo IX	(Republic of Ireland) Combilift Rallying	(Republic of Ireland) Josh Moffett	(United Kingdom) John Rowan	P	4
Mitsubishi	Mitsubishi Lancer Evo IX	(Portugal) Teodósio Motorsport	(Portugal) Ricardo Teodósio	(Portugal) José Teixeira	P	5
Mitsubishi	Mitsubishi Lancer Evo IX	(Portugal) ARC Sport	(Portugal) Luís Miguel Rego	(Portugal) António Costa	P	5
Mitsubishi	Mitsubishi Lancer Evo IX	(Estonia) Carglass Motorsport	(Estonia) Rainer Aus	(Estonia) Simo Koskinen	P	7
Mitsubishi	Mitsubishi Lancer Evo X	(Latvia) Vorobjovs Racing	(Latvia) Janis Vorobjovs	(Latvia) Andris Mālnieks	P	2, 7
Mitsubishi	Mitsubishi Lancer Evo X	(Latvia) Vorobjovs Racing	(Russia) Alexey Mersiyanov	(Russia) Georgiy Troshkin	P	2
Mitsubishi	Mitsubishi Lancer Evo X	(Estonia) G.M.Racing SK	(Estonia) Siim Plangi	(Estonia) Marek Sarapuu	P	2
Mitsubishi	Mitsubishi Lancer Evo X	(Russia) EAMV – RPM	(Russia) Alexey Lukyanuk	(Russia) Alexey Arnautov	P	7
Mitsubishi	Mitsubishi Lancer Evo X	(Estonia) Kaur Motorsport	(Estonia) Egon Kaur	(Estonia) Erik Lepikson	P	7
Mitsubishi	Mitsubishi Lancer Evo X	(Ukraine) The Boar – Proracing	(Ukraine) Yuriy Kochmar	(Ukraine) Volodymyr Shcherbakov	P	7
Citroën	Citroën DS3 RRC	(France) PH Sport	(France) Bryan Bouffier	(France) Xavier Panseri		2–3
Citroën	Citroën DS3 RRC	(France) Abu Dhabi Racing	(United Arab Emirates) Khalid Al Qassimi	(United Kingdom) Chris Patterson		9
Citroën	Citroën DS3 R5	(Belgium) Autostal Duindistel	(Belgium) Vincent Verschueren	(Belgium) Veronique Hostens		6
Citroën	Citroën DS3 R5	(Belgium) Top Teams by MY Racing	(France) Sébastien Chardonnet	(France) Thibault de la Haye		7
Citroën	Citroën DS3 R5	(Czech Republic) Gemini Clinic Rally Team	(Czech Republic) Miroslav Jakeš	(Czech Republic) Jaroslav Novák		8
Citroën	Citroën DS3 R3T	(Romania) Napoca Rally Academy	(Italy) Simone Tempestini	(Romania) Dorin Pulpea	2WD	3, 7–8
Citroën	Citroën DS3 R3T	(France) PH Sport	(France) Quentin Giordano	(France) Valentin Sarreaud	2WD	7
Citroën	Citroën C2 R2	(Bulgaria) Rangelov Motorsport	(Bulgaria) Ekaterina Stratieva	(Bulgaria) Angel Bashkehayov	L 2WD	1
Citroën	Citroën C2 R2	(Romania) Napoca Rally Academy	(Bulgaria) Ekaterina Stratieva	(Romania) Carmen Poenaru	L 2WD	5–6, 8
Citroën	Citroën C2 R2	(Romania) Napoca Rally Academy	(Romania) Florin Tincescu	(Romania) Iulian Nicolaescu	2WD J	2, 5, 8, 10–11
Citroën	Citroën C2 R2	(Finland) Immonen Motorsport	(Finland) Risto Immonen	(Finland) Mikko Lukka	2WD J	2
Citroën	Citroën C2 R2	(Finland) Immonen Motorsport	(Finland) Risto Immonen	(Finland) Jani Salo	2WD J	5
Porsche	Porsche 997 GT3	(United Kingdom) Richard Tuthill	(France) François Delecour	(France) Dominique Savignoni		11
Porsche	Porsche 997 GT3	(France) RD Rallye Team	(France) Romain Dumas	(France) Denis Giraudet		11
Honda	Honda Civic Type-R R3	Eurosol Racing Team Hungary	(Hungary) Zoltán Bessenyey	(Hungary) Yulianna Nyírfás	2WD	1, 3–4, 7–11
Honda	Honda Civic Type-R R3	(Italy) Honda Racing Team JAS	(Australia) Eli Evans	(Australia) Glen Weston	2WD	7
Honda	Honda Civic Type-R R3	(Italy) Honda Racing Team JAS	(Cyprus) Stavros Achilleos	(Cyprus) Andreas Chrysostomou	2WD	9
Suzuki	Suzuki Swift S1600	Suzuki Team Austria	(Austria) Michael Böhm	(Germany) Katrin Becker	2WD	1
Opel	Opel Adam R2	(Germany) ADAC Opel Rallye Junior Team	(Germany) Marijan Griebel	(Germany) Alexander Rath	2WD J	2, 6, 8
Opel	Opel Adam R2	(Germany) ADAC Opel Rallye Junior Team	(Germany) Fabian Kreim	(Germany) Josefine Beinke	2WD	6
Opel	Opel Adam R2	(Germany) Opel Motorsport	(Belgium) Bruno Thiry	(Luxembourg) Johny Blom	2WD	6
Renault	Renault Mégane RS	(France) Renault Sport Technologies	(France) Jean Matheo Antonini	(France) Cédric Santini	P	11
Renault	Renault Mégane RS	(France) Renault Sport Technologies	(France) Eric Filippi	(France) Guy Mizael	P	11
Renault	Renault Mégane RS	(France) Renault Sport Technologies	(France) Laurent Lacomy	(France) Sébastien Mattei	P	11
Renault	Renault Twingo RS R2	(France) Renault Sport Technologies	(United Kingdom) Chris Ingram	(France) Gabin Moreau	2WD J	2, 4–6
Renault	Renault Clio RS R3T	(France) Renault Sport Technologies	(Switzerland) Michaël Burri	(France) Anderson Levratti	2WD	10
Renault	Renault Clio RS R3T	(France) Renault Sport Technologies	(Switzerland) Laurent Reuche	(Switzerland) Jean Deriaz	2WD	10–11
Renault	Renault Clio RS R3T	(France) Renault Sport Technologies	(France) Yannick Vivens	(France) Christophe Valibouze	2WD	11
Renault	Renault Clio R3	(France) Renault Sport Technologies	(France) Pierre-Antoine Guglielmi	(France) Jean-Noël Vesperini	2WD	11

== Results ==
Round	Rally name	Podium finishers			
Round	Rally name	Rank	Driver	Car	Time
1	(Austria) Internationale Jänner Rallye (3–5 January) — Results	1	(Poland) Robert Kubica	Ford Fiesta RRC	2:26:42.4
1	(Austria) Internationale Jänner Rallye (3–5 January) — Results	2	(Czech Republic) Václav Pech	Mini John Cooper Works S2000	2:27:02.3
1	(Austria) Internationale Jänner Rallye (3–5 January) — Results	3	(Austria) Raimund Baumschlager	Škoda Fabia S2000	2:28:21.3
2	(Latvia) Rally Liepāja–Ventspils (31 January–2 February) — Results	1	(Finland) Esapekka Lappi	Škoda Fabia S2000	2:13:11.5
2	(Latvia) Rally Liepāja–Ventspils (31 January–2 February) — Results	2	(Russia) Vasiliy Gryazin	Ford Fiesta S2000	2:13:46.2
2	(Latvia) Rally Liepāja–Ventspils (31 January–2 February) — Results	3	(Republic of Ireland) Craig Breen	Peugeot 207 S2000	2:14:48.3
3	(Greece) Acropolis Rally (28–30 March) — Results	1	(Republic of Ireland) Craig Breen	Peugeot 208 T16 R5	2:21:20.2
3	(Greece) Acropolis Rally (28–30 March) — Results	2	(France) Bryan Bouffier	Citroën DS3 RRC	2:21:28.3
3	(Greece) Acropolis Rally (28–30 March) — Results	3	(Poland) Kajetan Kajetanowicz	Ford Fiesta R5	2:22:02.3
4	(Northern Ireland) / (Republic of Ireland) Circuit of Ireland (17–19 April) — Results	1	(Finland) Esapekka Lappi	Škoda Fabia S2000	2:06:15.5
4	(Northern Ireland) / (Republic of Ireland) Circuit of Ireland (17–19 April) — Results	2	(Germany) Sepp Wiegand	Škoda Fabia S2000	2:08:05.5
4	(Northern Ireland) / (Republic of Ireland) Circuit of Ireland (17–19 April) — Results	3	(Republic of Ireland) Robert Barrable	Ford Fiesta R5	2:08:13.0
5	(Portugal) Rallye Açores (15–17 May) — Results	1	(Portugal) Bernardo Sousa	Ford Fiesta RRC	2:43:56.7
5	(Portugal) Rallye Açores (15–17 May) — Results	2	(Netherlands) Kevin Abbring	Peugeot 208 T16	2:44:02.9
5	(Portugal) Rallye Açores (15–17 May) — Results	3	(France) Jean-Michel Raoux	Peugeot 207 S2000	2:51:48.6
6	(Belgium) Ypres Rally (19–21 June) — Results	1	(Belgium) Freddy Loix	Škoda Fabia S2000	2:43:13.7
6	(Belgium) Ypres Rally (19–21 June) — Results	2	(Belgium) Cédric Cherain	Ford Fiesta R5	2:44:23.6
6	(Belgium) Ypres Rally (19–21 June) — Results	3	(Germany) Sepp Wiegand	Škoda Fabia S2000	2:45:27.9
7	Rally Estonia (17–19 July) — Results and report	1	(Estonia) Ott Tänak	Ford Fiesta R5	1:49:36.4
7	Rally Estonia (17–19 July) — Results and report	2	(Russia) Alexey Lukyanuk	Mitsubishi Lancer Evolution X	1:50:23.5
7	Rally Estonia (17–19 July) — Results and report	3	(Estonia) Timmu Kõrge	Ford Fiesta R5	1:50:31.8
8	(Czech Republic) Barum Czech Rally Zlín (29–31 August) — Results and report	1	(Czech Republic) Václav Pech	Mini John Cooper Works S2000	2:16:28.7
8	(Czech Republic) Barum Czech Rally Zlín (29–31 August) — Results and report	2	(Germany) Sepp Wiegand	Škoda Fabia S2000	2:17:20.2
8	(Czech Republic) Barum Czech Rally Zlín (29–31 August) — Results and report	3	(Czech Republic) Tomáš Kostka	Ford Fiesta R5	2:17:20.4
9	Cyprus Rally (19–21 September) — Results and report	1	(Saudi Arabia) Yazeed Al-Rajhi	Ford Fiesta RRC	3:03:44.4
9	Cyprus Rally (19–21 September) — Results and report	2	(Poland) Kajetan Kajetanowicz	Ford Fiesta R5	3:04:33.3
9	Cyprus Rally (19–21 September) — Results and report	3	(Qatar) Abdulaziz Al-Kuwari	Ford Fiesta RRC	3:05:14.9
10	(Switzerland) Rallye International du Valais (23–25 October) — Results and report	1	(Finland) Esapekka Lappi	Škoda Fabia S2000	2:46:22.4
10	(Switzerland) Rallye International du Valais (23–25 October) — Results and report	2	(Republic of Ireland) Craig Breen	Peugeot 208 T16	2:47:04.4
10	(Switzerland) Rallye International du Valais (23–25 October) — Results and report	3	(Germany) Sepp Wiegand	Škoda Fabia S2000	2:49:26.5
11	(France) Tour de Corse (6–8 November) — Results and report	1	(France) Stéphane Sarrazin	Ford Fiesta RRC	2:36:48.4
11	(France) Tour de Corse (6–8 November) — Results and report	2	(France) Bryan Bouffier	Ford Fiesta RRC	2:37:07.3
11	(France) Tour de Corse (6–8 November) — Results and report	3	(Netherlands) Kevin Abbring	Peugeot 208 T16	2:38:26.6

== Championship standings ==
=== Drivers' Championship ===
- For the drivers' championship, only the best four results from the first six rallies and the best four results from the remaining six rallies could be retained by each driver.
- Points for final position are awarded as in following table

Position	1st	2nd	3rd	4th	5th	6th	7th	8th	9th	10th
Points	25	18	15	12	10	8	6	4	2	1

- Bonus points awarded for position in each Leg

Position	1st	2nd	3rd	4th	5th	6th	7th
Points	7	6	5	4	3	2	1

Top 10
Pos	Driver	JÄN (Austria)	LIE (Latvia)	ACR (Greece)	IRL (Republic of Ireland)	AZO (Portugal)	YPR (Belgium)	BEST 4	EST (Estonia)	ZLÍ (Czech Republic)	CYP (Cyprus)	VAL (Switzerland)	COR (France)	Points
1	(Finland) Esapekka Lappi		1^{25+14}	4^{12+8}	1^{25+14}		Ret^{0+5}	103	5^{10+6}	Ret^{0+5}		1^{25+13}	Ret	162
2	(Germany) Sepp Wiegand		5^{10+7}	Ret^{0+3}	2^{18+10}		3^{15+7}	70	7^{6+2}	2^{18+8}		3^{15+9}	Ret	128
3	(Republic of Ireland) Craig Breen		3^{15+10}	1^{25+13}	Ret^{0+6}	Ret	Ret^{0+1}	70		Ret	Ret^{0+4}	2^{18+12}		104
4	(Poland) Kajetan Kajetanowicz	Ret	4^{12+7}	3^{15+10}		Ret^{0+4}		48		6^{8+7}	2^{18+13}	Ret^{0+6}	Ret	100
5	(Czech Republic) Václav Pech	2^{18+12}						30		1^{25+8}				63
6	(Netherlands) Kevin Abbring			Ret	Ret	2^{18+13}	Ret^{0+7}	38		Ret		Ret	3^{15+10}	63
7	(France) Bryan Bouffier		Ret	2^{18+13}				31					2^{18+12}	61
8	(Portugal) Bruno Magalhães			5^{10+4}		Ret^{0+4}	Ret	18		10^{1}	3^{15+10}	Ret	6^{8+2}	54
9	(Russia) Vasiliy Gryazin	7^{6+1}	2^{18+12}	6^{8+3}		21^{0+5}	Ret	53						53
10	(France) Robert Consani	9^{2}	23	10^{1+1}	4^{12+6}	4^{12+3}	Ret	37	Ret	Ret^{0+2}	Ret	6^{8+3}	Ret	50

Key
Colour	Result
Gold	Winner
Silver	2nd place
Bronze	3rd place
Green	Points finish
Blue	Non-points finish
Blue	Non-classified finish (NC)
Purple	Did not finish (Ret)
Black	Excluded (EX)
Black	Disqualified (DSQ)
White	Did not start (DNS)
White	Cancelled (C)
Blank	Withdrew entry from the event (WD)

11th – 84th Classification
Pos	Driver	JÄN (Austria)	LIE (Latvia)	ACR (Greece)	IRL (Republic of Ireland)	AZO (Portugal)	YPR (Belgium)	BEST 4	EST (Estonia)	ZLÍ (Czech Republic)	CYP (Cyprus)	VAL (Switzerland)	COR (France)	Points
11	(Estonia) Ott Tänak							0	1^{25+13}	7^{6}				44
12	(Czech Republic) Jaromír Tarabus	5^{10+7}	Ret	9^{2+1}				20	11	5^{10+7}		Ret	8^{4}	41
13	(Poland) Robert Kubica	1^{25+14}						39						39
14	(France) Stéphane Sarrazin							0					1^{25+14}	39
15	(Saudi Arabia) Yazeed Al-Rajhi							0			1^{25+14}			38
16	(Portugal) Bernardo Sousa					1^{25+12}		37						37
17	(Belgium) Freddy Loix						1^{25+12}	37						37
18	(Russia) Alexey Lukyanuk							0	2^{18+12}					30
19	(Belgium) Cedric Cherain						2^{18+9}	27						27
20	(Estonia) Timmu Kõrge		Ret					0	3^{15+11}					26
21	(Czech Republic) Jaroslav Orsák		Ret	7^{6}			10^{1}	7		4^{12+7}	Ret	Ret		26
22	(Republic of Ireland) Robert Barrable				3^{15+10}			25						25
23	(Austria) Raimund Baumschlager	3^{15+9}						24						24
24	(Czech Republic) Tomáš Kostka							0		3^{15+9}				24
25	(France) Jean-Michel Raoux	16	Ret	8^{4}		3^{15+3}		22	Ret					22
26	(Austria) Beppo Harrach	4^{12+8}						20						20
27	(France) Eric Camilli							0					4^{12+8}	20
28	(Cyprus) Christos Demosthenous							0			6^{12+7}			19
29	(Switzerland) Jonathan Hirschi							0				4^{12+5}	12	17
30	(Netherlands) Hermen Kobus						4^{12+5}	17						17
31	(Estonia) Rainer Aus							0	4^{12+5}					17
32	(Italy) Luca Rossetti						5^{10+7}	17						17
33	(Cyprus) Stavros Antoniou							0			7^{10+5}			15
34	(United Kingdom) Neil Simpson				5^{10+4}		Ret	14		11		Ret		14
35	(Switzerland) Olivier Burri							0				5^{10+4}		14
36	(France) Romain Dumas							0					5^{10+4}	14
37	(Ukraine) Vitaliy Pushkar	Ret	7^{6}	Ret			16	6	13	Ret	9^{6+2}	16	17	14
38	(Austria) Andreas Aigner	6^{8+4}						12						12
39	(Estonia) Karl Kruuda							0	6^{8+3}					10
40	(Portugal) Luís Rêgo					5^{10}		10						10
41	(Latvia) Janis Vorobjovs		6^{8+2}					10	Ret					10
42	(Czech Republic) Antonin Tlusták	13	29	12		8^{4}	Ret	4		9^{2}	10^{4}	11	14	10
43	(Cyprus) Petros Panteli							0			8^{8+2}			10
44	(Republic of Ireland) Daniel McKenna				6^{8+1}			9						9
45	(Belgium) Davy Vanneste						6^{8+1}	9						9
46	(France) Jean-Mathieu Leandri							0					7^{6+3}	9
47	(Portugal) Ricardo Teodósio					6^{8}		8						8
48	(Republic of Ireland) Josh Moffett				7^{6+2}			8						8
49	(Czech Republic) Roman Odlozilik	8^{4+1}						5		Ret^{0+3}				8
50	(Portugal) Ruben Rodrigues					7^{6}		6						6
51	(Belgium) Andy Lefevere						7^{6}	6						6
52	(Switzerland) Nicolas Althaus							0				7^{6}		6
53	(Portugal) Ricardo Moura					Ret^{0+6}		6						6
54	(Czech Republic) Jan Černý	Ret	10^{1}		8^{4}	Ret	Ret	5		29				5
55	(Russia) Stanislav Travnikov		8^{4+1}					5						5
56	(Switzerland) Pascal Perroud							0				8^{4+1}		5
57	(Belgium) Didier Duquesne						8^{4}	4						4
58	(Estonia) Roland Murakas							0	8^{4}					4
59	(Czech Republic) Martin Vlček							0		8^{4}				4
60	(Estonia) Egon Kaur							0	Ret^{0+4}					4
61	(Lithuania) Martynas Samuitis		9^{2+1}					3	12					3
62	(France) Julien Maurin							0					Ret^{0+3}	3
63	(Republic of Ireland) Sam Moffett				Ret^{0+3}			3						3
64	(Switzerland) Sebastien Carron							0				Ret^{0+3}		3
65	(Portugal) Pedro Meireles					Ret^{0+3}		3						3
66	(Estonia) Jonathan Greer				9^{2}			2						2
67	(Portugal) Pedro Vale					9^{2}		2						2
68	(Belgium) Melissa Debackere						9^{2}	2						2
69	(France) Sébastien Chardonnet							0	9^{2}					2
70	(Switzerland) Florian Gonon							0				9^{2}		2
71	(France) Pierre-Antoine Gugliemi							0					9^{2}	2
72	(Cyprus) Kyriacos Kyriacou							0			11^{2}			2
73	(Estonia) Siim Plangi		Ret^{0+2}					2	Ret					2
74	(Belgium) Bernd Casier						Ret^{0+2}	2						2
75	(Portugal) João Barros					Ret^{0+2}		2						2
76	(Switzerland) Laurent Reuche							0				12	10^{1}	1
77	(France) Stéphane Lefebvre		Ret			10^{1}	17	1						1
78	(Hungary) Zoltán Bessenyey			18	10^{1}			1	20					1
79	(Austria) Hermaan Neubauer	10^{1}	26					1						1
80	(Finland) Kristian Sohlberg							0	10^{1}					1
81	(Switzerland) Jean-Philippe Radoux							0				10^{1}		1
82	(Cyprus) Dimitri Papasavvas							0			12^{1}			1
83	(Portugal) Adruzilo Lopes					Ret^{0+1}		1						1
84	(Latvia) Mãrtins Svilis		Ret^{0+1}					1						1
Pos	Driver	JÄN (Austria)	LIE (Latvia)	ACR (Greece)	IRL (Republic of Ireland)	AZO (Portugal)	YPR (Belgium)	BEST 4	EST (Estonia)	ZLÍ (Czech Republic)	CYP (Cyprus)	VAL (Switzerland)	COR (France)	Points

=== Other classifications ===
- For the Masters, points are awarded for each special stage using a system of 10–6–4–2–1 with all stages counting.

==== Ice Masters ====
Pos	Driver	JÄN (Austria)	LIE (Latvia)	Points
1	(Poland) Robert Kubica	1^{122}		122
2	(Czech Republic) Václav Pech	2^{110}		110
3	(Finland) Esapekka Lappi		1^{93}	93
4	(Austria) Raimund Baumschlager	3^{68}		68
5	(Poland) Kajetan Kajetanowicz	Ret^{36}	4^{23}	59

Note: 14 more competitors have scored points for the Ice Masters

==== Gravel Masters ====
Pos	Driver	ACR (Greece)	AZO (Portugal)	EST (Estonia)	CYP (Cyprus)	Points
1	(Poland) Kajetan Kajetanowicz	3^{27}	Ret^{54}		2^{110}	191
2	(Republic of Ireland) Craig Breen	1^{48}	Ret^{60}		12^{52}	160
3	(Estonia) Ott Tänak			1^{127}		127
4	(Saudi Arabia) Yazeed Al Rajhi				1^{106}	106
5	(Netherlands) Kevin Abbring		2^{91}			91

Note: 30 more competitors have scored points for the Gravel Masters

==== Asphalt Masters ====
Pos	Driver	ACR (Greece)	IRL (Republic of Ireland)	YPR (Belgium)	ZLÍ (Czech Republic)	VAL (Switzerland)	COR (France)	Points
1	(Finland) Esapekka Lappi		1^{144}	Ret^{32}	Ret^{50}	1^{104}	Ret^{13}	355
2	(Republic of Ireland) Craig Breen	1^{37}	Ret^{68}	Ret^{18}	Ret^{11}	2^{132}	Ret^{17}	283
3	(Netherlands) Kevin Abbring	Ret^{32}	Ret^{28}	Ret^{105}	Ret^{30}	Ret^{58}	3^{21}	274
4	(Germany) Sepp Wiegand	Ret^{2}	2^{82}	3^{25}	2^{16}	3^{46}		170
5	(France) Bryan Bouffier	2^{32}					2^{76}	108

Note: 30 more competitors have scored points for the Asphalt Masters

==== Production Cup ====
Pos	Driver	JÄN (Austria)	LIE (Latvia)	ACR (Greece)	IRL (Republic of Ireland)	AZO (Portugal)	YPR (Belgium)	BEST 4	EST (Estonia)	ZLÍ (Czech Republic)	CYP (Cyprus)	VAL (Switzerland)	COR (France)	Points
1	(Ukraine) Vitaliy Pushkar	Ret	2^{18+9}	1^{25+13}		Ret^{0+6}	7^{6+3}	80	5^{10+3}	Ret^{0+3}	4^{12+9}	3^{15+10}	2^{18+10}	167
2	(Czech Republic) Martin Hudec	6^{8+4}	5^{10+3}	2^{18+10}		5^{10+4}	4^{12+7}	74		3^{15+8}	7^{6+1}	5^{10+7}	Ret^{0+6}	127
3	(Hungary) Tibor Erdi	Ret^{0+4}		Ret^{0+7}			3^{15+10}	36					4^{12+6}	54
4	(Latvia) Jãnis Vorobjovs		1^{25+11}					36	Ret^{0+4}					40
5	(Russia) Alexey Lukyanuk							0	1^{25+14}					39

Note: 63 more competitors have scored points for the Production Cup

==== ERC Juniors ====
The ERC Junior Championship is awarded to drivers who had scored the highest number of points from the best results made on 4 eligible rallies, including one gravel. Strike-out text means classification not accounted.

Pos	Driver	LIE (Latvia)	IRL (Republic of Ireland)	AZO (Portugal)	YPR (Belgium)	ZLÍ (Czech Republic)	VAL (Switzerland)	COR (France)	Points
1	(France) Stéphane Lefebvre	~~Ret^{0+3}~~		1^{25+14}	1^{25+10}	1^{25+11}		2^{18+11}	140
2	(Italy) Andrea Crugnola	5^{10+3}	~~Ret~~	~~Ret~~	2^{18+11}	~~4^{12+11}~~	1^{25+14}	1^{25+12}	118
3	(Czech Republic) Jan Černý	1^{25+14}	1^{25+13}	~~Ret~~	Ret^{0+1}	6^{8+3}			89
4	(Belgium) Gino Bux		~~6^{8+6}~~	3^{15+8}	4^{12+6}	5^{10+5}		4^{12+10}	78
5	(Poland) Aleksander Zawada	6^{8}	5^{10+4}	~~Ret~~	~~Ret^{0+5}~~	3^{15+11}	3^{15+10}	~~Ret~~	73
