= 2014 Barum Czech Rally Zlín =

2014 Barum Czech Rally Zlín: 44. Barum Czech Rally Zlín 2014
Round 8 of 12 of the 2014 European Rally Championship
← Previous event	Next event →
- Host country: Czech Republic
- Rally base: (Czech Republic) Zlín
- Dates run: 29 – 31 August 2014
- Stages: 15
- Stage surface: Asphalt

Statistics
- Crews: 105 at start, 58 at finish

Overall results
- Overall winner: (Czech Republic) Václav Pech; EuroOil Invelt Team

The 2014 Barum Czech Rally Zlín was the eighth round of the 2014 European Rally Championship season. The event was won by Václav Pech and Petr Uhel.

== Results ==
Pos	No	Driver	Co-driver	Entrant	Car	Time/Retired	Points
1	4	(Czech Republic) Václav Pech	(Czech Republic) Petr Uhel	EuroOil Invelt Team	Mini Cooper S2000 1.6T	2:16:28.7	
2	7	(Germany) Sepp Wiegand	(Germany) Frank Christian	Skoda Auto Deutschland	Škoda Fabia S2000	2:17:20.2	
3	17	(Czech Republic) Tomáš Kostka	(Czech Republic) Miroslav Houšť	Rufa Sport	Ford Fiesta R5	2:17:20.4	
4	15	(Czech Republic) Jaroslav Orsák	(Czech Republic) David Šmeidler		Škoda Fabia S2000	2:17:41.5	
5	11	(Czech Republic) Jaromír Tarabus	(Czech Republic) Daniel Trunkát	Czech National Team	Škoda Fabia S2000	2:17:42.3	
6	6	(Poland) Kajetan Kajetanowicz	(Poland) Jaroslaw Baran	Lotos Rally Team	Ford Fiesta R5	2:17:43.1	
7	2	(Estonia) Ott Tänak	(Estonia) Raigo Mõlder	Drive DMACK	Ford Fiesta R5	2:19:10.2	
8	21	(Czech Republic) Martin Vlček	(Czech Republic) Richard Lasevič	Svarmetal Motorsport	Škoda Fabia S2000	2:21:58.9	
9	20	(Czech Republic) Antonín Tlusťák	(Czech Republic) Ladislav Kučera		Škoda Fabia S2000	2:22:34.5	
10	8	(Portugal) Bruno Magalhães	(Portugal) Carlos Magalhães		Peugeot 208 T16	2:23:36.0	
