= 2014 Acropolis Rally =

Round 3 of 12 of the 2014 European Rally Championship
← Previous event	Next event →
- Host country: Greece
- Rally base: Loutraki
- Dates run: 28 – 30 March 2014
- Stages: 13
- Stage surface: Tarmac/Gravel

Statistics
- Crews: 27 at start, 23 at finish

Overall results
- Overall winner: (Republic of Ireland) Craig Breen; Peugeot Rally Academy

The 2014 Acropolis Rally was the third round of the 2014 European Rally Championship season, held in Greece between 28 and 30 March 2014.

The rally was won by Craig Breen and co-driver Scott Martin, on the competitive début of Peugeot's 208 T16 R5 rally car.

== Results ==
Pos	No	Driver	Co-driver	Entrant	Car	Time/Retired	Points
1	2	(Republic of Ireland) Craig Breen	(United Kingdom) Scott Martin	Peugeot Rally Academy	Peugeot 208 T16 R5	2:21:20.2	38
2	1	(France) Bryan Bouffier	(France) Xavier Panseri		Citroën DS3 RRC	2:21:28.3	31
3	4	(Poland) Kajetan Katejanowicz	(Poland) Jaroslaw Baran	Lotos Rally Team	Ford Fiesta R5	2:22:02.3	25
4	3	(Finland) Esapekka Lappi	(Finland) Janne Ferm	Škoda Motorsport	Škoda Fabia S2000	2:22:53.2	20
5	7	(Portugal) Bruno Magalhães	(Portugal) Carlos Magalhães		Peugeot 207 S2000	2:26:00.2	14
6	5	(Russia) Vasiliy Gryazin	(Russia) Dmitry Eremeev	Sports Racing Technologies	Ford Fiesta S2000	2:27:32.0	11
7	15	(Czech Republic) Jaroslav Orsák	(Czech Republic) David Smeidler		Škoda Fabia S2000	2:29:11.4	6
8	11	(France) Jean Michel Raoux	(France) Laurent Magat		Peugeot 207 S2000	2:30:28.8	4
9	9	(Czech Republic) Jaromír Tarabus	(Czech Republic) Daniel Trunkát	Jipocar Czech National Team	Škoda Fabia S2000	2:30:38.6	3
10	10	(France) Robert Consani	(France) Vincent Landais		Peugeot 207 S2000	2:31:13.1	2
Did not finish
SS6	6	(Netherlands) Kevin Abbring	(United Kingdom) Sebastian Marshall	Peugeot Rally Academy	Peugeot 208 T16 R5	Mechanical	
SS4	8	(Germany) Sepp Wiegand	(Germany) Frank Christian	Škoda Auto Deutschland	Škoda Fabia S2000	Accident	3
