= 2014 Rally Azores =

2014 Rally Azores: 49. SATA Rallye Açores 2014
Round 5 of 12 of the 2014 European Rally Championship
← Previous event	Next event →
- Host country: Portugal
- Rally base: (Portugal) / (Azores) Ponta Delgada
- Dates run: 15 – 17 May 2014
- Stages: 18
- Stage surface: Gravel

Statistics
- Crews: 58 at start, 25 at finish

Overall results
- Overall winner: (Portugal) Bernardo Sousa; AT Rally Team

The 2014 Rally Azores was the fifth round of the 2014 European Rally Championship season, held in Ponta Delgada between 15–17 May 2014.

It was won by Madeiran Bernardo Sousa and co-driver Hugo Magalhães while Kevin Abbring/Sebastian Marshall and Jean-Michel Raoux/Laurent Magat completed the podium.

== Results ==
Pos	No	Driver	Co-driver	Entrant	Car	Time/Retired	Points
1	7	(Portugal) Bernardo Sousa	(Portugal) Hugo Magalhães	Ford Fiesta RRC	Ford Fiesta RRC	2:43:56.7	37
2	4	(Netherlands) Kevin Abbring	(United Kingdom) Sebastian Marshall	Peugeot Rally Academy	Peugeot 208 T16	2:44:02.9	31
3	11	(France) Jean-Michel Raoux	(France) Laurent Magat	—	Ford Fiesta R5	2:51:48.6	18
4	9	(France) Robert Consani	(France) Maxime Vilmot	—	Peugeot 207 S2000	2:53:15.5	15
5	22	(Portugal) Luís Miguel Rego	(Portugal) António Costa	ARC Sport	Mitsubishi Lancer Evo IX	2:54:04.2	10
6	20	(Portugal) Ricardo Teodósio	(Portugal) José Teixeira	—	Mitsubishi Lancer Evo IX	2:54:07.9	8
7	23	(Portugal) Ruben Rodrigues	(Portugal) Estevão Rodrigues	ACB Racing	Mitsubishi Lancer Evo IX R4	2:54:12.5	6
8	12	(Czech Republic) Antonin Tlusťák	(Czech Republic) Jan Škaloud	GPD Mit Metal Racing Team	Škoda Fabia S2000	2:55:12.2	4
9	25	(Portugal) Pedro Vale	(Portugal) Rui Medeiros	—	Subaru Impreza STi N12	2:55:35.8	2
10	35	(France) Stéphane Lefebvre	(France) Thomas Dubois	Peugeot Rally Academy	Peugeot 208 R2	2:56:01.9	1
Did not finish
SS10	1	(Republic of Ireland) Craig Breen	(United Kingdom) Scott Martin	Peugeot Rally Academy	Peugeot 208 T16	Electrical	
SS5	3	(Poland) Katejan Katejanowicz	(Poland) Jaroslaw Baran	Lotos Rally Team	Ford Fiesta R5	Suspension	
SS4	5	(Portugal) Ricardo Moura	(Portugal) Sancho Eiró	ARC Sport	Ford Fiesta R5	Accident	6
SS11	14	(Portugal) Pedro Meireles	(Portugal) Mário Castro	Škoda Bank	Škoda Fabia S2000	Retired	3
SS6	15	(Portugal) João Barros	(Portugal) Jorge Henriques	P&B Racing	Ford Fiesta R5	Mechanical	2
SS11	19	(Portugal) Adruzilo Lopes	(Portugal) Tiago Azevedo	ARC Sport	Subaru Impreza STi R4	Retired	1

=== Junior ERC ===
Pos	No	Driver	Co-driver	Entrant	Car	Time/Retired	Points
1	35	(France) Stéphane Lefebvre	(France) Thomas Dubois	Peugeot Rally Academy	Peugeot 208 R2	2:56:01.9	39
2	36	(United Kingdom) Chris Ingram	(France) Gabin Moreau	—	Renault Twingo RS R2 Evo2	2:59:17.4	30
3	37	(Belgium) Gino Bux	(Belgium) Eric Borguet	DG Sport	Peugeot 208 VTi R2	3:01:32.7	23
4	32	(Finland) Risto Immonen	(Finland) Jani Salo	Immonen Motorsport	Citroën C2 R2 Max	3:04:35.3	20
5	40	(Belgium) Guillaume Dilley	(Belgium) Geoffrey Brion	New Racing	Citroën C2 R2 Max	3:04:39.6	15
