= 2014 Circuit of Ireland =

2014 Circuit of Ireland: 72. Circuit of Ireland 2014
Round 4 of 12 of the 2014 European Rally Championship
← Previous event	Next event →
- Host country: Northern Ireland
- Rally base: (Northern Ireland) Ulster
- Dates run: 17 – 19 April 2014
- Stages: 18
- Stage surface: Tarmac

Statistics
- Crews: 31 at start, 18 at finish

Overall results
- Overall winner: (Finland) Esapekka Lappi; Škoda Motorsport

The 2014 Circuit of Ireland was the fourth round of the 2014 European Rally Championship season, held in Ulster between 17 and 19 April 2014. The Circuit returned to the European Rally Championship over the Easter weekend, starting in Belfast, Northern Ireland. The Circuit of Ireland consisted of 18 special stages covering a total of 230 kilometres (140 miles) over the weekend.

Finnish driver Esapekka Lappi dominated the International section, towards the European Rally Championship, finishing almost two minutes ahead of second place Sepp Wiegand from Germany, who completed a Škoda 1–2. Irishman Robert Barrable finished third in his Ford Fiesta R5. Declan Boyle won the Circuit of Ireland National Rally in his Subaru Impreza S12B WRC, while teenage British driver Chris Ingram held the lead of the ERC Junior Championship event, but crashed out, handing the win to Czech driver Jan Černý. Ingram still became the youngest winner of the Colin McRae 'Flat Out' Award, handed to him by local hero Kris Meeke.

== Entry list ==
No	Driver	Co-driver	Entrant	Car	Cup
1	(Republic of Ireland) Craig Breen	(United Kingdom) Scott Martin	Peugeot Rally Academy	Peugeot 208 T16	
2	(Finland) Esapekka Lappi	(Finland) Janne Ferm	Škoda Motorsport	Škoda Fabia 2000	
3	(Netherlands) Kevin Abbring	(United Kingdom) Sebastian Marshall	Peugeot Rally Academy	Peugeot 208 T16	
4	(Germany) Sepp Wiegand	(Germany) Frank Christian	Škoda Auto Deutschland	Škoda Fabia 2000	
5	(Republic of Ireland) Robert Barrable	(United Kingdom) Stuart Loudon	—	Ford Fiesta R5	
6	(Republic of Ireland) Sam Moffett	(Republic of Ireland) James O'Reilly	—	Ford Fiesta RRC	
7	(Republic of Ireland) Josh Moffett	(United Kingdom) John Rowan	—	Mitsubishi Lancer Evo IX	
8	(United Kingdom) Neil Simpson	(United Kingdom) Claire Mole	Simpsons Škoda	Škoda Fabia S2000	
9	(France) Robert Consani	(France) Maxime Vilmot	—	Peugeot 207 S2000	
10	(Hungary) Lászlo Vizin	(Hungary) Gábor Zsíros	—	Peugeot 207 S2000	
11	(Republic of Ireland) Aaron MacHale	(Republic of Ireland) Eamonn Walsh	—	Mitsubishi Lancer Evo IX	
12	(United Kingdom) Robert Woodside	(United Kingdom) Allan Harryman	—	Mitsubishi Lancer Evo X R4	
14	(Czech Republic) Jan Černý	(Czech Republic) Pavel Kohout	Czech National Team	Peugeot 208 VTi R2	2WD J
15	(Norway) Petter Kristiansen	(Norway) Ole Kristian Brennum	—	Škoda Fabia R2	2WD J
16	(Italy) Andrea Crugnola	(Italy) Michele Ferrara	—	Peugeot 208 VTi R2	2WD J
17	(Poland) Aleksander Zawada	(France) Cathy Derousseaux	—	Peugeot 208 VTi R2	2WD J
18	(United Kingdom) Chris Ingram	(France) Gabin Moreau	—	Renault Twingo RS R2 Evo2	2WD J
20	(Republic of Ireland) Stephen Wright	(Republic of Ireland) Susanne Wright	—	Peugeot 208 VTi R2	2WD J
21	(United Kingdom) Alex Parpottas	(United States) Alexander Kihurani	—	Ford Fiesta R2	2WD J
22	(Belgium) Gino Bux	(Belgium) Eric Borguet	DG Sport	Peugeot 208 VTi R2	2WD J
23	(Hungary) Zoltán Bessenyey	(Hungary) Julianna Nyírfás	—	Honda Civic Type-R R3	2WD
24	(Finland) Jukka Korhonen	(Finland) Marko Salminen	Autosport Technology	Citroën DS3 R3T	2WD
25	(Republic of Ireland) Daniel McKenna	(Republic of Ireland) Arthur Kierans	—	Citroën DS3 R3T	2WD
26	(United Kingdom) Jonathan Greer	(United Kingdom) Kirsty Riddick	—	Citroën DS3 R3T	2WD
28	(Republic of Ireland) Eugene Meegan	(Republic of Ireland) Sarah Whelan	—	Mitsubishi Lancer Evo IX	
30	(United Kingdom) Stanley Ballantine	(United Kingdom) Wendy Blackledge	—	Mitsubishi Lancer Evo IX	
31	(Portugal) Renato Pita	(Portugal) Hugo Magalhães	—	Peugeot 208 VTi R2	2WD
34	(United Kingdom) Richard Tannahill	(Republic of Ireland) Aileen Kelly	—	Peugeot 208 VTi R2	2WD
35	(Republic of Ireland) Mervyn Wedlock	(Republic of Ireland) Philip Smith	—	Honda Civic Type-R	2WD
36	(United Kingdom) Barry Greer	(United Kingdom) Damien Duffin	—	Ford Fiesta R2	2WD
37	(Republic of Ireland) Calvin Beattie	(Republic of Ireland) Emmet Sherry	—	Ford Fiesta R2	2WD
Total entries: 31

== Results ==
Pos	No	Driver	Co-driver	Entrant	Car	Time/Retired	Points
1	2	(Finland) Esapekka Lappi	(Finland) Janne Ferm	Škoda Motorsport	Škoda Fabia 2000	2:06:15.5	39
2	4	(Germany) Sepp Wiegand	(Germany) Frank Christian	Škoda Auto Deutschland	Škoda Fabia 2000	2:08:05.5	28
3	5	(Republic of Ireland) Robert Barrable	(United Kingdom) Stuart Loudon	—	Ford Fiesta R5	2:08:13.0	25
4	9	(France) Robert Consani	(France) Maxime Vilmot	—	Peugeot 207 S2000	2:11:49.5	18
5	8	(United Kingdom) Neil Simpson	(United Kingdom) Claire Mole	Simpsons Škoda	Škoda Fabia S2000	2:12:49.0	14
6	25	(Republic of Ireland) Daniel McKenna	(Republic of Ireland) Arthur Kierans	—	Citroën DS3 R3T	2:17:02.0	9
7	7	(Republic of Ireland) Josh Moffett	(United Kingdom) John Rowan	—	Mitsubishi Lancer Evo IX	2:17:16.1	8
8	14	(Czech Republic) Jan Černý	(Czech Republic) Pavel Kohout	Czech National Team	Peugeot 208 VTi R2	2:19:12.9	4
9	26	(United Kingdom) Jonathan Greer	(United Kingdom) Kirsty Riddick	—	Citroën DS3 R3T	2:20:05.6	2
10	23	(Hungary) Zoltán Bessenyey	(Hungary) Julianna Nyírfás	—	Honda Civic Type-R R3	2:21:19.6	1
Did not finish
SS11	1	(Republic of Ireland) Craig Breen	(United Kingdom) Scott Martin	Peugeot Rally Academy	Peugeot 208 T16	Cooling	6
SS8	3	(Netherlands) Kevin Abbring	(United Kingdom) Sebastian Marshall	Peugeot Rally Academy	Peugeot 208 T16	Cooling	
SS13	6	(Republic of Ireland) Sam Moffett	(Republic of Ireland) James O'Reilly	—	Ford Fiesta RRC	Fuel pressure	3
SS2	11	(Republic of Ireland) Aaron MacHale	(Republic of Ireland) Eamonn Walsh	—	Mitsubishi Lancer Evo IX	Accident	
SS3	16	(Italy) Andrea Crugnola	(Italy) Michele Ferrara	—	Peugeot 208 VTi R2	Accident	
SS13	18	(United Kingdom) Chris Ingram	(France) Gabin Moreau	—	Renault Twingo RS R2 Evo2	Accident	

=== Junior ERC ===
Pos	No	Driver	Co-driver	Entrant	Car	Time/Retired	Points
1	14	(Czech Republic) Jan Černý	(Czech Republic) Pavel Kohout	Czech National Team	Peugeot 208 VTi R2	2:19:12.9	38
2	21	(United Kingdom) Alex Parpottas	(United States) Alexander Kihurani	—	Ford Fiesta R2	2:21:25.6	28
3	15	(Norway) Petter Kristiansen	(Norway) Ole Kristian Brennum	—	Škoda Fabia R2	2:22:40.9	23
4	20	(Republic of Ireland) Stephen Wright	(Republic of Ireland) Susanne Wright	—	Peugeot 208 VTi R2	2:23:03.5	19
5	17	(Poland) Aleksander Zawada	(France) Cathy Derousseaux	—	Peugeot 208 VTi R2	2:25:26.8	14
6	22	(Belgium) Gino Bux	(Belgium) Eric Borguet	DG Sport	Peugeot 208 VTi R2	2:29:30.0	14
