= 2015 Internationale Jänner Rallye =

2015 Internationale Jänner Rallye: 32. Internationale Jänner Rallye 2015
Round 1 of 10 of the 2015 European Rally Championship
← Previous event	Next event →
- Host country: Austria
- Rally base: Freistadt
- Dates run: 4 – 6 January 2015
- Stages: 18 (237.80 km; 147.76 miles)
- Stage surface: Asphalt/Snow
- Overall distance: 825.14 km (512.72 miles)

Statistics
- Crews: 27 at start, 19 at finish

Overall results
- Overall winner: (Poland) Kajetan Kajetanowicz; Lotos Rally Team

The 2015 Internationale Jänner Rallye was the first round of the 2015 European Rally Championship season, held in Austria between 4–6 January 2015.

The rally was won by Kajetan Kajetanowicz and Jarosław Baran.

== Results ==
Pos	No	Driver	Co-driver	Entrant	Car	Time	Points
1	3	(Poland) Kajetan Kajetanowicz	(Poland) Jarosław Baran	Lotos Rally Team	Ford Fiesta R5	2:50:52.6	39
2	4	(France) Robert Consani	(France) Maxime Vilmot	Delta Rally	Peugeot 207 S2000	2:58:00.0	28
3	7	(Belarus) Alexey Lukyanuk	(Ukraine) Yevgen Chervonenko	Chervonenko Racing	Ford Fiesta R5	2:59:20.7	25
4	5	(Czech Republic) Jaromír Tarabus	(Czech Republic) Daniel Trunkát	Kresta Racing	Škoda Fabia S2000	2:59:41.4	22
5	30	(Austria) Martin Fischerlehner	(Austria) Tobias Unterweger	Kit Racing	Mitsubishi Lancer Evolution IX	3:13:31.2	14
6	9	(Switzerland) Jonathan Hirschi	(France) Vincent Landais	HRT Rally Team	Peugeot 208 T16 R5	3:18:19.5	8
7	6	(Czech Republic) Antonín Tlusťák	(Czech Republic) Ladislav Kučera	Tlusťák Racing	Škoda Fabia S2000	3:18:22.3	8
8	11	(Czech Republic) Vojtěch Štajf	(Czech Republic) František Rajnoha	Subaru Duck Czech National Team	Subaru Impreza WRX STi	3:19:11.2	4
9	14	(Hungary) Dávid Botka	(Hungary) Péter Mihalik	Botka Rally Team	Mitsubishi Lancer Evolution IX	3:21:31.1	2
10	8	(France) Jean-Michel Raoux	(France) Thomas Escartefigue	100% Sport	Ford Fiesta R5	3:25:53.1	2

== Standings after the rally ==
Drivers
Pos	Driver	Points
1	(Poland) Kajetan Kajetanowicz	39
2	(France) Robert Consani	28
3	(Belarus) Alexey Lukyanuk	25
4	(Czech Republic) Jaromír Tarabus	22
5	(Austria) Martin Fischerlehner	14

ERC-2
Pos	Driver	Points
1	(Czech Republic) Vojtěch Štajf	38
2	(Hungary) Dávid Botka	29
3	(Hungary) Krisztian Hideg	7
4	(Poland) Lukasz Kabaciński	4

ERC-3
Pos	Driver	Points
1	(Poland) Slawomir Ogryzek	39
2	(Italy) Simone Tempestini	30
3	(Hungary) Kristóf Klausz	23
4	(Portugal) Renato Pita	20
5	(Hungary) Szabolcs Várkonyi	16
