= 2014 Rally Estonia =

Round of European Rally Championship, held in Estonia

2014 Rally Estonia: 5. auto24 Rally Estonia 2014
Round 7 of 12 of the 2014 European Rally Championship
← Previous event	Next event →
- Host country: Estonia
- Rally base: Tartu, Tartu County
- Dates run: 17 – 19 July 2014
- Start location: Kambja, Tartu County
- Finish location: Puhja, Tartu County
- Stages: 15 (231.55 km; 143.88 miles)
- Stage surface: Gravel

Statistics
- Crews: 61 at start, 30 at finish

Overall results
- Overall winner: (Estonia) Ott Tänak (Estonia) Raigo Mõlder (Estonia) MM Motorsport; 1:49:36.4

The auto24 Rally Estonia 2014 was the fifth running of the Rally Estonia. The rally was the seventh round of the 2014 European Rally Championship season. The event was won by Ott Tänak & Raigo Mõlder who won 11 stages out of 15.

== Report ==
Icon	Cup
2WD	ERC 2WD Cup
P	ERC Production Cup

=== Classification ===
Pos.		No.	Driver	Co-driver	Team	Car	Cup	Time	Difference	Points	
Event	Class	No.	Driver	Co-driver	Team	Car	Cup	Time	Difference	Class	Bonus
Overall classification
1		1	(Estonia) Ott Tänak	(Estonia) Raigo Mõlder	(Estonia) MM Motorsport	Ford Fiesta R5		1:49:36.4	0.0	25	13
2		16	(Russia) Alexey Lukyanuk	(Russia) Alexey Arnautov	(Lithuania) EAMV	Mitsubishi Lancer Evo X	P	1:50:23.5	+47.1	18	12
3		9	(Estonia) Timmu Kõrge	(Estonia) Erki Pints	(Estonia) MM Motorsport	Ford Fiesta R5		1:50:31.8	+55.4	15	11
4		24	(Estonia) Rainer Aus	(Estonia) Simo Koskinen	(Estonia) Carglass Rallyteam	Mitsubishi Lancer Evo IX	P	1:51:48.1	+2:11.7	12	5
5		2	(Finland) Esapekka Lappi	(Finland) Janne Ferm	(Czech Republic) Škoda Motorsport	Škoda Fabia S2000		1:51:53.6	+2:17.2	10	6
6		3	(Estonia) Karl Kruuda	(Estonia) Martin Järveoja	(Estonia) ME3 Rally Team	Peugeot 208 T16		1:52:33.2	+2:56.8	8	3
7		4	(Germany) Sepp Wiegand	(Germany) Frank Christian	(Germany) Škoda Auto Deutschland	Škoda Fabia S2000		1:53:00.5	+3:24.1	6	2
8		20	(Estonia) Roland Murakas	(Estonia) Kalle Adler	(Estonia) Prorehv Rally Team	Mitsubishi Lancer Evo X	P	1:53:18.2	+3:41.8	4	
9		7	(France) Sébastien Chardonnet	(France) Thibault de la Haye	(Belgium) Top Teams By MY Racing	Citroën DS3 R5		1:54:24.1	+4:47.7	2	
10		12	(Finland) Kristian Sohlberg	(Finland) Peter Flythström	(United Kingdom) Drive DMACK	Ford Fiesta R5		1:55:35.4	+5:59.0	1	
ERC 2WD Cup standings
17	1	45	(Estonia) Sander Pärn	(United Kingdom) James Morgan	(Estonia) SP Rally Project	Ford Fiesta R2	2WD	2:01:15.2	0.0	25	
18	2	62	(Italy) Fabio Andolfi	(Italy) Simone Scattolin		Peugeot 208 R2	2WD	2:03:54.2	+2:39.0	18	
20	3	41	(Hungary) Zoltán Bessenyey	(Hungary) Yulianna Nyírfás	Eurosol Racing Team Hungary	Honda Civic Type-R R3	2WD	2:05:02.8	+3:47.6	15	

=== Special stages ===
Date	No.	Stage name	Distance	Winners	Car	Time	Rally leaders
18 July	SS1	Kambja 1	14.93 km	Tänak / Mõlder	Ford Fiesta R5	7:00.7	Tänak / Mõlder
18 July	SS2	Sulaoja 1	24.42 km	Tänak / Mõlder	Ford Fiesta R5	11:29.7	Tänak / Mõlder
18 July	SS3	Kambja 2	14.93 km	Tänak / Mõlder	Ford Fiesta R5	6:53.9	Tänak / Mõlder
18 July	SS4	Sulaoja 2	24.42 km	Tänak / Mõlder	Ford Fiesta R5	11:19.6	Tänak / Mõlder
18 July	SS5	Arula 1	9.39 km	Lukyanuk / Arnautov	Mitsubishi Lancer Evo X	4:25.0	Tänak / Mõlder
18 July	SS6	Rüa 1	12.43 km	Tänak / Mõlder	Ford Fiesta R5	5:51.8	Tänak / Mõlder
18 July	SS7	Arula 2	9.39 km	Tänak / Mõlder	Ford Fiesta R5	4:22.2	Tänak / Mõlder
18 July	SS8	Rüa 2	12.43 km	Tänak / Mõlder	Ford Fiesta R5	5:48.5	Tänak / Mõlder
18 July	SS9	Tartu City	1.33 km	Tänak / Mõlder	Ford Fiesta R5	1:06.1	Tänak / Mõlder
19 July	SS10	Rimmi 1	13.09 km	Tänak / Mõlder	Ford Fiesta R5	6:10.6	Tänak / Mõlder
19 July	SS11	Vaabina 1	28.77 km	Lukyanuk / Arnautov	Mitsubishi Lancer Evo X	13:29.4	Tänak / Mõlder
19 July	SS12	Rimmi 2	13.09 km	Tänak / Mõlder	Ford Fiesta R5	6:02.4	Tänak / Mõlder
19 July	SS13	Vaabina 2	28.77 km	Tänak / Mõlder	Ford Fiesta R5	13:19.7	Tänak / Mõlder
19 July	SS14	Raiga	12.27 km	Lukyanuk / Arnautov	Mitsubishi Lancer Evo X	5:49.6	Tänak / Mõlder
19 July	SS15	Ristimäe	11.89 km	Lukyanuk / Arnautov	Mitsubishi Lancer Evo X	6:15.9	Tänak / Mõlder
