= 2014 Ypres Rally =

2014 Ypres Rally: 50. Geko Ypres Rally 2014
Round 6 of 12 of the 2014 European Rally Championship
← Previous event	Next event →
- Host country: Belgium
- Rally base: (Belgium) Ypres
- Dates run: 19 – 21 June 2014
- Stages: 20
- Stage surface: Gravel/Tarmac

Statistics
- Crews: 97 at start, 48 at finish

Overall results
- Overall winner: (Belgium) Freddy Loix; Autostal Duindistel

The 2014 Geko Ypres Rally was the 50th running of the event and the sixth round of the 2014 European Rally Championship season. The event was won by Freddy Loix and Johan Gitsels. It was Loix's ninth Ypres rally victory.

The ERC Juniors category was won by Stéphane Lefebvre and Thomas Dubois,

== Results ==
Pos	No	Driver	Co-driver	Entrant	Car	Time/Retired	Points
1	3	(Belgium) Freddy Loix	(Belgium) Johan Gitsels	Autostal Duindistel	Škoda Fabia S2000	2:43:13.7	
2	16	(Belgium) Cédric Cherain	(Belgium) André Leyh	Royal Ecurie Ardennes	Ford Fiesta R5	2:44:23.6	
3	7	(Germany) Sepp Wiegand	(Germany) Frank Christian	Škoda Auto Deutschland	Škoda Fabia S2000	2:45:27.9	
4	9	(Netherlands) Hermen Kobus	(Netherlands) Erik de Wild	Kobus Tuning	Ford Fiesta S2000	2:45:46.2	
5	1	(Italy) Luca Rossetti	(Italy) Matteo Chiarcossi	DP Autosport	Škoda Fabia S2000	2:46:58.2	
6	19	(Belgium) Davy Vanneste	(Belgium) Eddy Snaet	Autostal Duindstel	Peugeot 207 S2000	2:48:39.1	
7	20	(Belgium) Andy Lefevere	(Belgium) Andy Vangheluwe	Andy Lefevere Rallysport	Mitsubishi Lancer Evo X R4	2:49:25.2	
8	21	(Belgium) Didier Duquesne	(Belgium) Filip Cuvelier	Autostal Atlantic	Ford Fiesta R5	2:50:06.9	
9	23	(Belgium) Melisa Debackere	(Belgium) Cindy Cokelaere	Autostal Duindstel	Peugeot 207 S2000	2:50:13.4	
10	22	(Czech Republic) Jaroslav Orsák	(Czech Republic) David Šmeidler	GPD Mit Metal Racing Team	Škoda Fabia S2000	2:52:15.1	
Did not finish
SS9	4	(Spain) Xavier Pons	(Spain) Alex Haro	ACSM Rallye Team	Ford Fiesta R5	Retired	
SS9	5	(Finland) Esapekka Lappi	(Finland) Janne Ferm	Škoda Motorsport	Škoda Fabia S2000	Accident	
SS1	11	(Belgium) Bernd Casier	(Belgium) Pieter Vyncke	Autostal Duindstel	Ford Fiesta R5	Lost wheel	
SS14	2	(Republic of Ireland) Craig Breen	(United Kingdom) Scott Martin	Peugeot Rally Academy	Peugeot 208 T16 R5	Broken Differential	
SS14	6	(Netherlands) Kevin Abbring	(United Kingdom) Sebastian Marshall	Peugeot Rally Academy	Peugeot 208 T16 R5	Mechanical	
