= Peugeot 208 T16 =

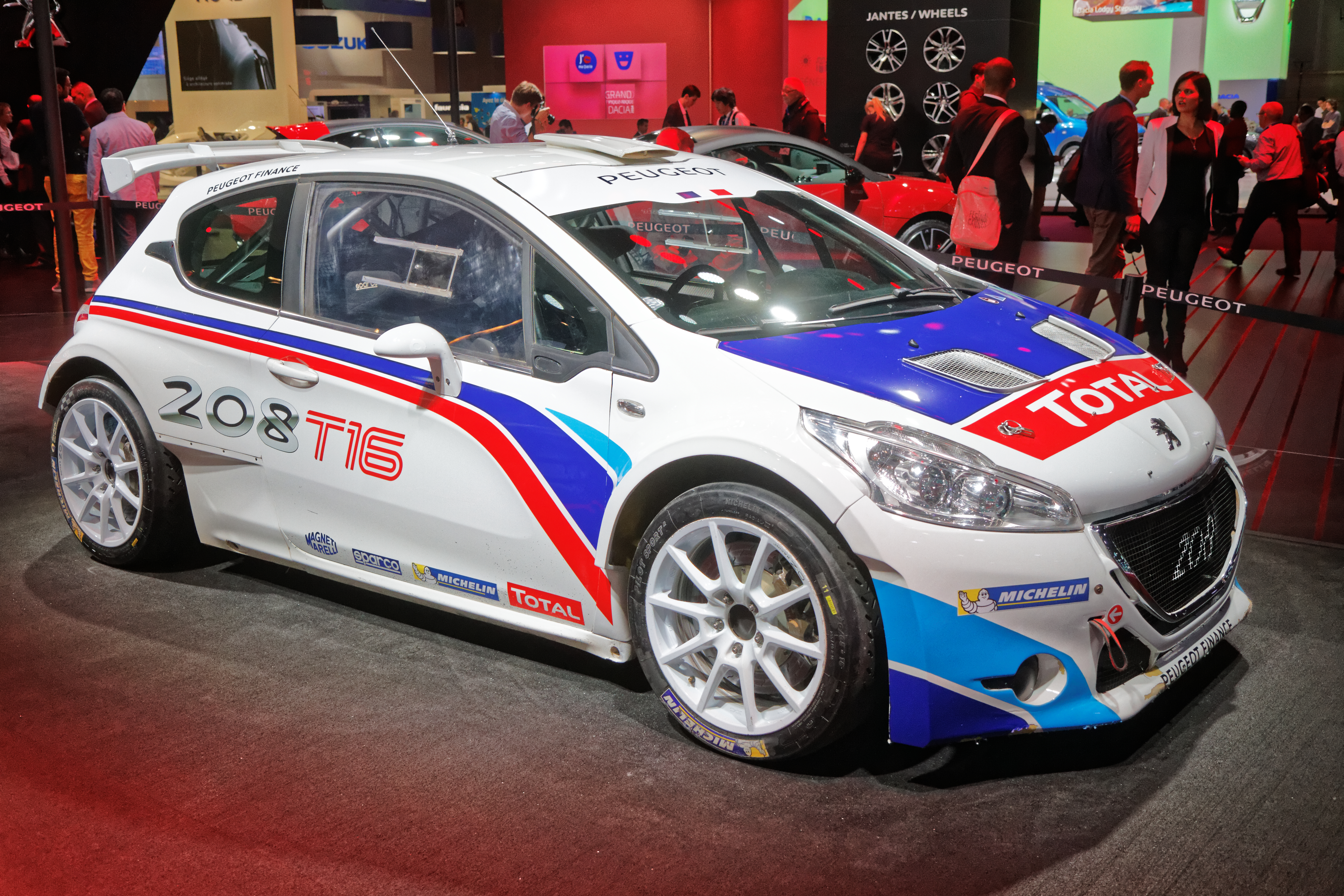

Overview
- Manufacturer: Peugeot/Peugeot Sport
- Production: 2014
- Assembly: Paris, France
- Designer: Bertrand Vallat

Body and chassis
- Class: R5
- Layout: 4-wheel drive
- Platform: Peugeot 208
- Related: Citroën DS3 R5; Citroën C3 R5

Powertrain
- Engine: 1.6 L (98 cu in) 4-cylinder, 16-valve turbocharged engine (2014–2019)
- Transmission: 3MOP 5 speed sequential gearbox mated to 3MOP front and rear limited slip differential units

Dimensions
- Wheelbase: 2560 mm
- Length: 3962 mm
- Width: 1820 mm
- Kerb weight: minimum 1200 kg

Chronology
- Predecessor: Peugeot 207 S2000

The Peugeot 208 T16 is an R5 rally car developed by Peugeot Sport. It is based upon the Peugeot 208 road car and is the successor of the successful Peugeot 207 S2000.

== ERC Victories ==
No.	Event	Season	Driver	Co-driver
1	(Greece) Acropolis Rally	2014	(Republic of Ireland) Craig Breen	(United Kingdom) Scott Martin
2	(Latvia) Rally Liepāja–Ventspils	2015	(Republic of Ireland) Craig Breen	(United Kingdom) Scott Martin
3	(Northern Ireland) / (Republic of Ireland) Circuit of Ireland	2015	(Republic of Ireland) Craig Breen	(United Kingdom) Scott Martin
4	(Portugal) Rallye Açores	2015	(Republic of Ireland) Craig Breen	(United Kingdom) Scott Martin

== See also ==
- Ford Fiesta R5
- Citroën DS3 R5
- Škoda Fabia R5
- Power-to-weight ratio
