= Authier =

Authier may refer to:

== People ==
- Christian Authier (born 1969), French writer and journalist
- Hector Authier (1881–1971), Canadian politician
- Pierre Authier, French car designer

== Other uses ==
- Authier, Quebec, a municipality in Canada
