= Peugeot 208 =

Supermini car produced by Peugeot

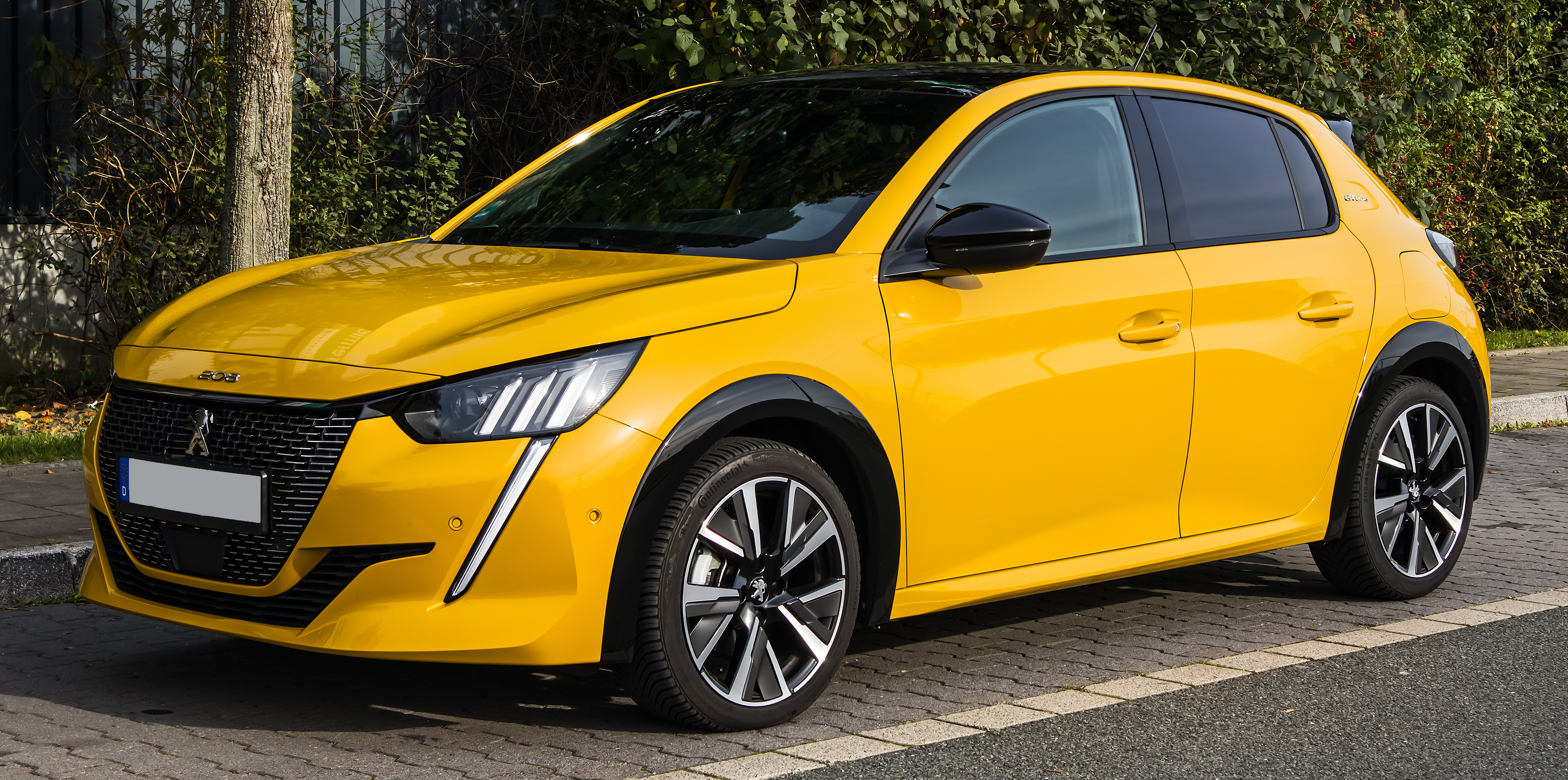
- Peugeot 208 GT Line (second generation)

Overview
- Manufacturer: Peugeot (Note: PSA Group (2012–2021); Stellantis (2021–present))
- Production: March 2012 – present

Body and chassis
- Class: Supermini (B)
- Layout: Front-engine, front-wheel-drive
- Related: Peugeot 2008

Chronology
- Predecessor: Peugeot 207

The Peugeot 208 is a supermini car produced by the French automaker Peugeot. Unveiled at the Geneva Motor Show in March 2012 and positioned below the larger 308, the 208 replaced the 207 in 2012, and the second generation model was introduced in 2019.

== First generation (A9; 2012) ==
First generation
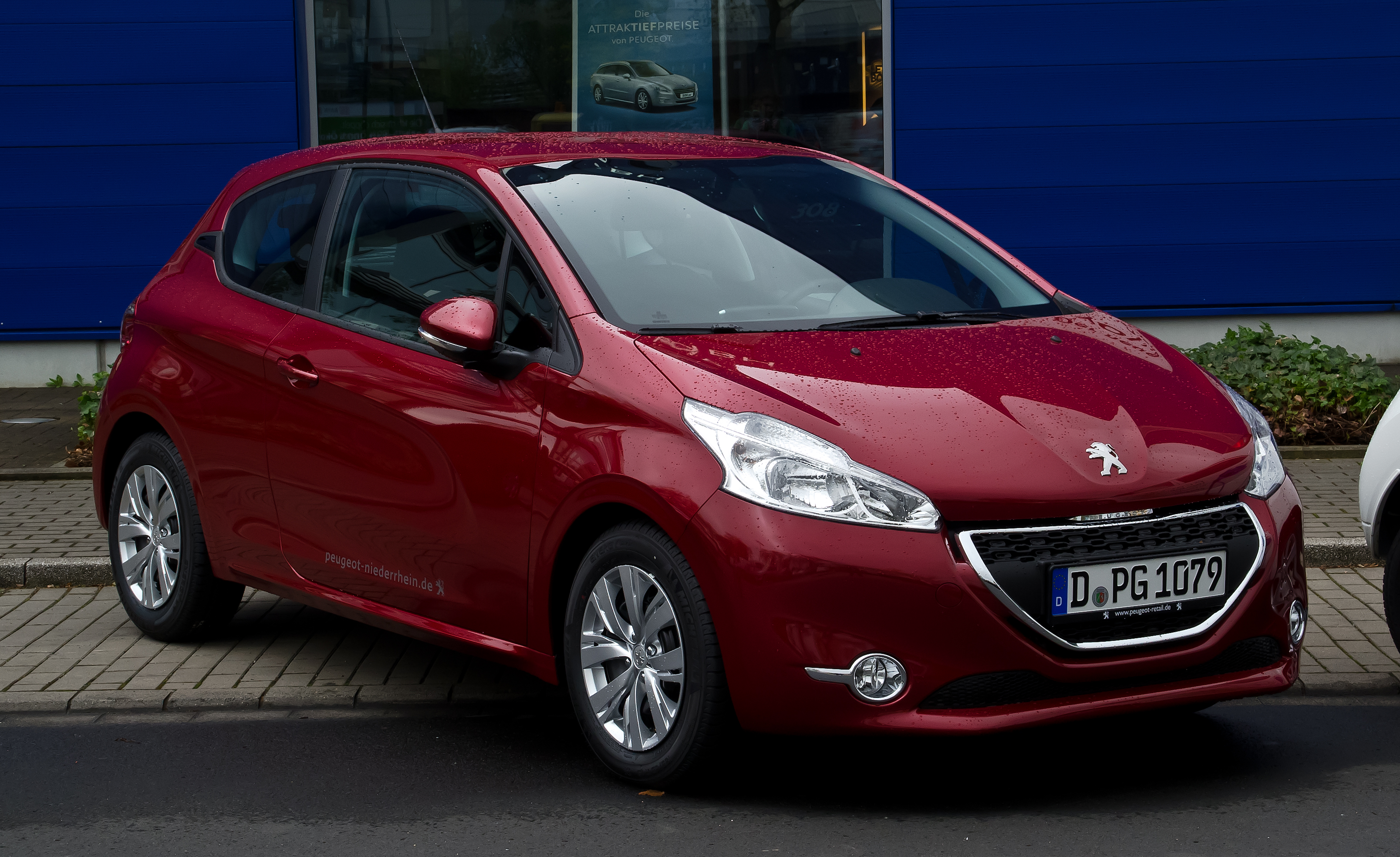
- 2012 Peugeot 208 VTi Active 3-door hatchback (pre-facelift; Germany)

Overview
- Model code: A9
- Production: March 2012 – August 2019 (Europe); January 2013 – March 2020 (Brazil)
- Assembly: France: Mulhouse (Mulhouse Plant); Poissy (Poissy Plant); Brazil: Porto Real (PSA Brazil); Malaysia: Gurun (NAM); Slovakia: Trnava (Trnava Plant); Iran: Tehran (IKAP)
- Designer: Pierre Authier

Body and chassis
- Body style: 3/5-door hatchback
- Platform: PSA PF1 platform
- Related: Peugeot 2008 (A94); Citroën C3 (SX); Citroën C4 Cactus; DS 3 Opel Crossland

Powertrain
- Engine: Petrol: 1.0 L EB0 I3; 1.2 L EB2 I3; 1.2 L EB2 turbo I3; 1.4 L Prince EP3 I4; 1.6 L Prince EP6 I4; 1.6 L Prince EP6 turbo I4; Diesel: 1.4 L DV4 HDi I4; 1.5 L DV5 HDi I4; 1.6 L DV6 HDi I4
- Transmission: 5/6-speed manual 5 speed ETG5 semi automatic 4-speed AL4 automatic 6-speed EAT6 automatic

Dimensions
- Wheelbase: 2,538 mm (99.9 in)
- Length: 3,962 mm (156.0 in)
- Width: 1,739 mm (68.5 in)
- Height: 1,460 mm (57.5 in)
- Curb weight: 975–1,295 kg (2,150–2,855 lb)

The 208 was designed by a team under the direction of Pierre Authier who also designed the Peugeot 2008 Mk1. In November 2011, the initial 208 models were three-door hatchbacks produced at Peugeot's new plant in Trnava, Slovakia. As five-door hatchbacks became available in June 2012, production also started at Peugeot's French plants located in Mulhouse and Poissy.

=== Design ===
The first-generation 208, developed under the code name "A9", is constructed on the PSA PF1 platform. The car was unveiled in March 2012 at Geneva Motor Show 2012. It is 173 kg (381 lb) (or 110 kg (243 lb) on average) lighter than the 207, while still providing more room. The boot capacity is rated at 285 L (10 cu ft) (VDA), which is 15 L (1 cu ft) more than the 207, while the legroom in the rear seat has increased by 5 cm (2 in).

The design work of the first-generation 208 was led by Pierre Authier, with Sylvain Henry as the exterior designer. Adam Bazydlo was responsible for the interior design, and Marie Sanou oversaw colour and trim. The vehicle is equipped with a tablet computer-like display, a panoramic glass roof surrounded by LED lights, and has a relatively low drag coefficient of 0.29.

The three-door 208 was discontinued in mid-2018, and Peugeot ceased production of the first-generation 208 in Europe in 2019. From January 2013 to March 2020, the first-generation 208 was produced in Brazil. It was replaced with the second-generation model, which is imported from Argentina.

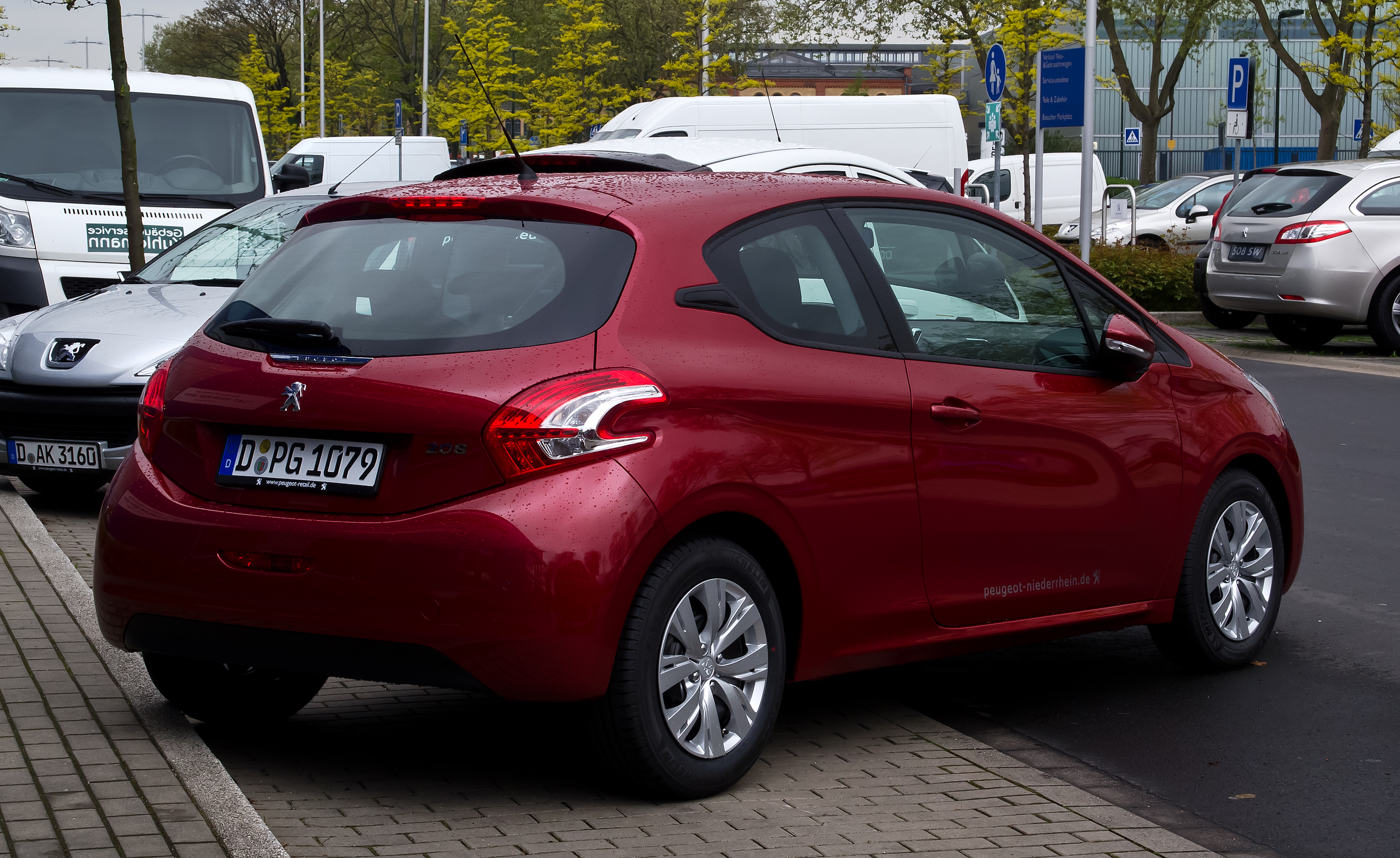
2012 Peugeot 208 VTi Active 3-door hatchback (pre-facelift; Germany)

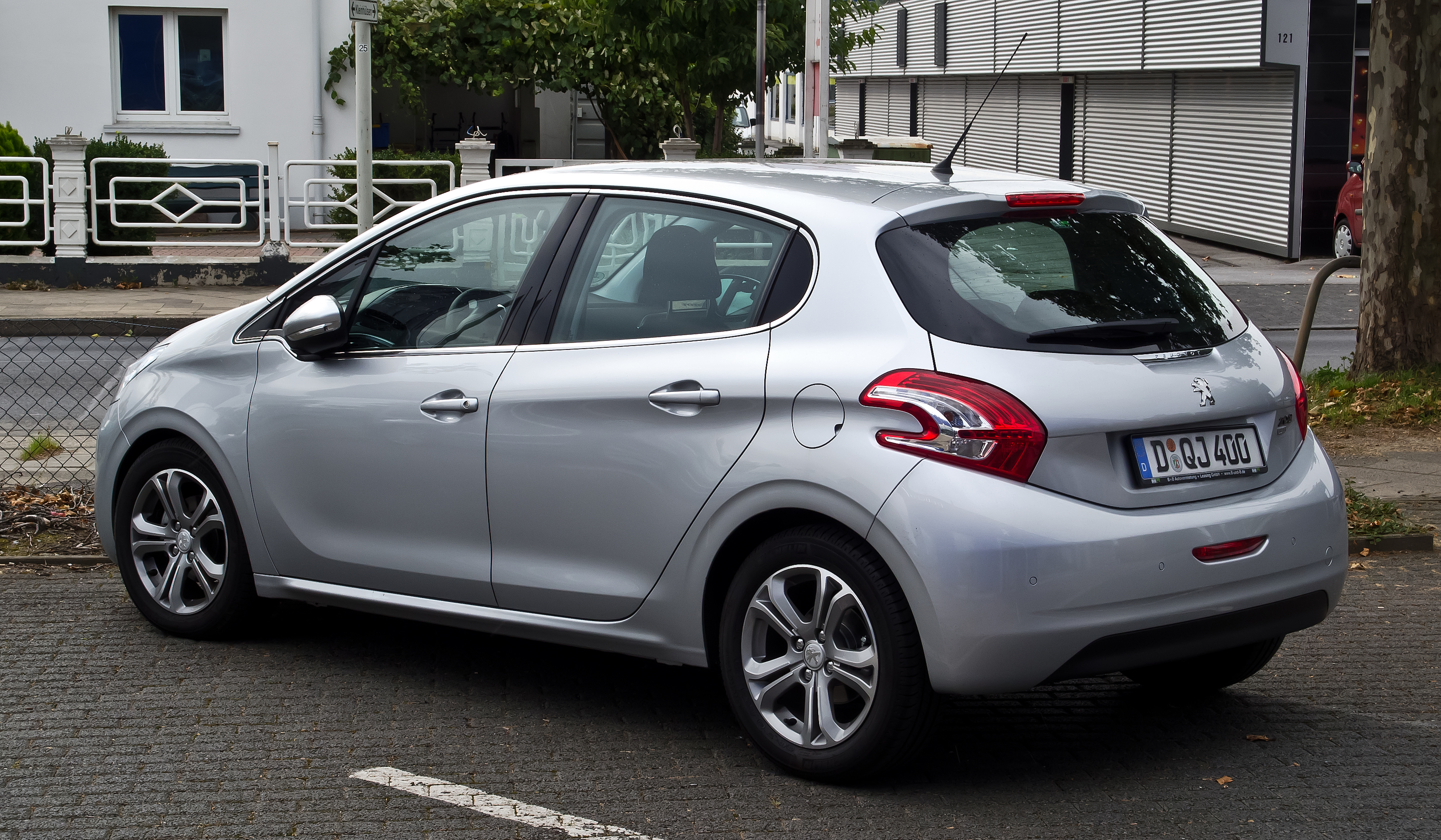
2012 208 e-HDi FAP 115 Allure 5-door hatchback (pre-facelift, Germany)

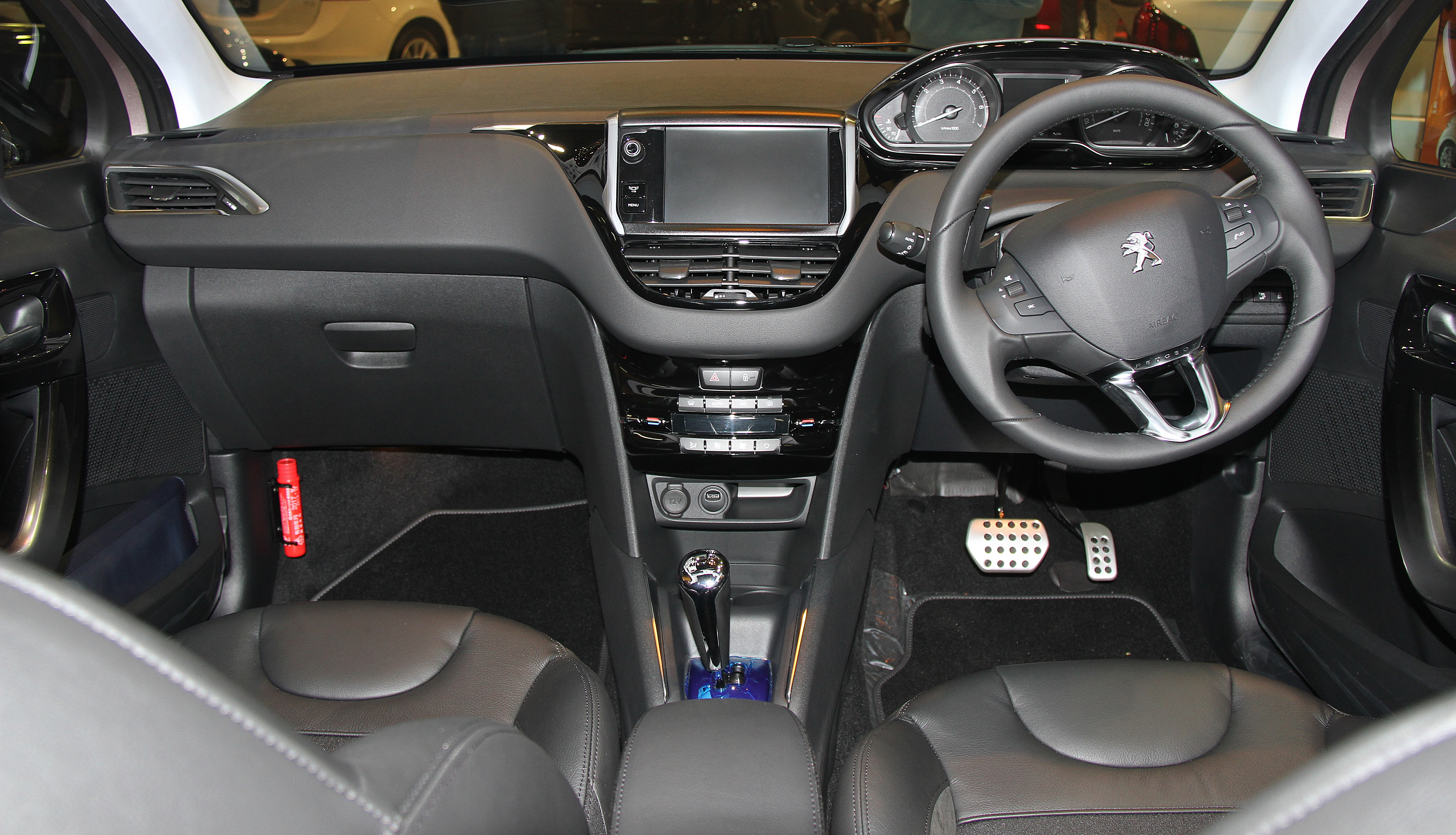
Interior

=== Presentation ===
Five petrol and three diesel were available from its launch in 2012. To keep maximum weight reduction, the brand favours fuel consumption, safety and the overall performance of the vehicle. All components of the vehicle have been considered with this in mind. The vehicle features an aluminium front beam-absorber, size of the front subframe, laser welding of the roof, and an extensive use of VHSS and UHSS panels, soundproofing of the engine. The vehicle weighs about 110 kg (240 lb) less than the 207.

After launch, the Peugeot 208 Mk1 had received new variants that moved towards the hot hatch segment. The GTi had started production in February 2013, with a 1.6-litre petrol engine, and the XY trim level had started slightly after the GTi, positioned between the 208 and the GTi model. The diesel engines return the most efficient fuel economy.

In June 2015, the Mk1 208 was given a facelift, which had revised its styling, and added extra safety equipment. The facelift also introduced the top-level GT-Line trim level, which added a touchscreen display, Apple CarPlay and Android Auto compatibility on most models. In November 2014 Peugeot launched the limited edition "30th Anniversary" version of the 208 GTi, and the diesel range would decrease to a 1.5-litre line-up by 2018.

The Peugeot Connect Apps system appeared for the first time in the Peugeot 208.

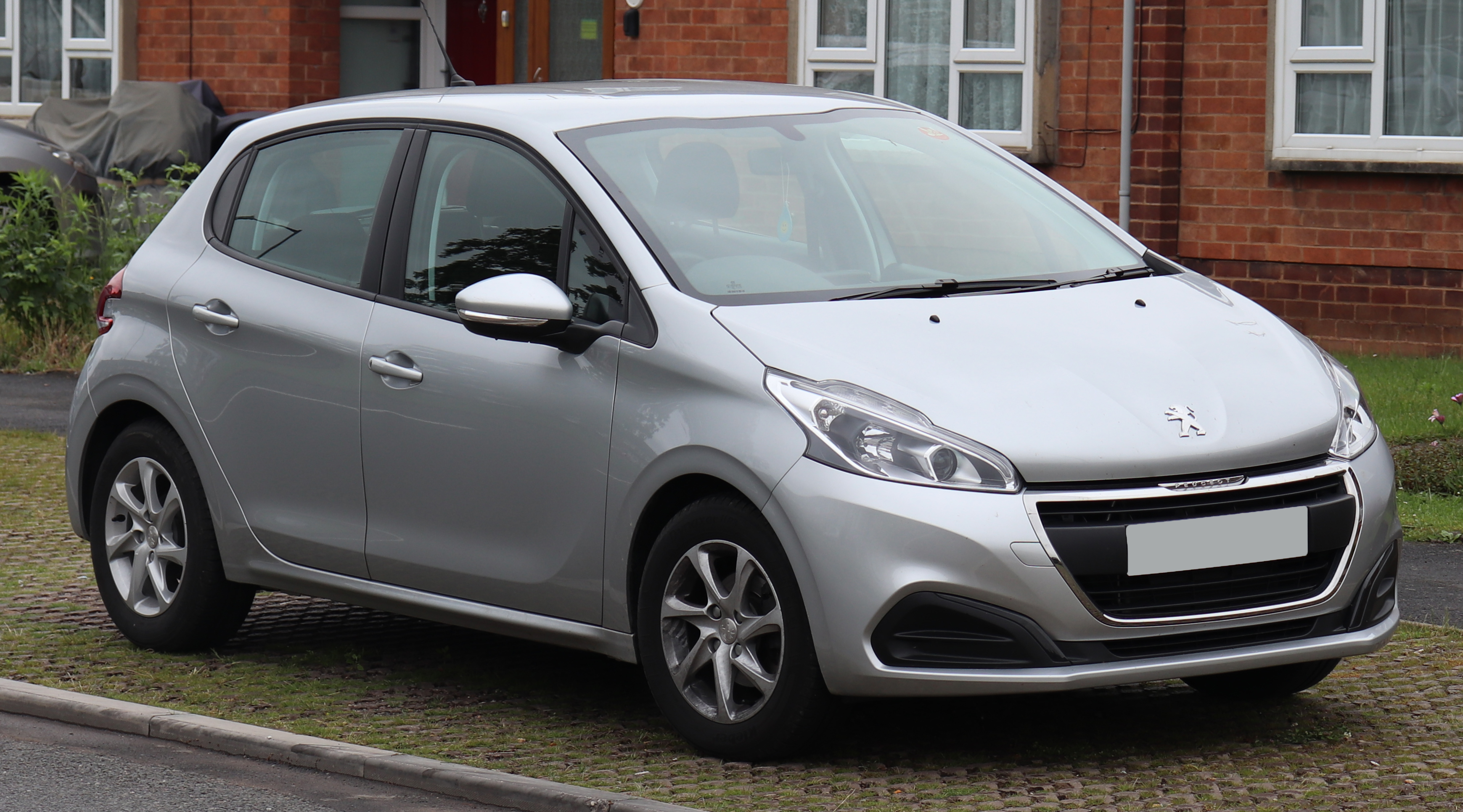
2017 208 1.2 Active 5-door hatchback (facelift; UK)

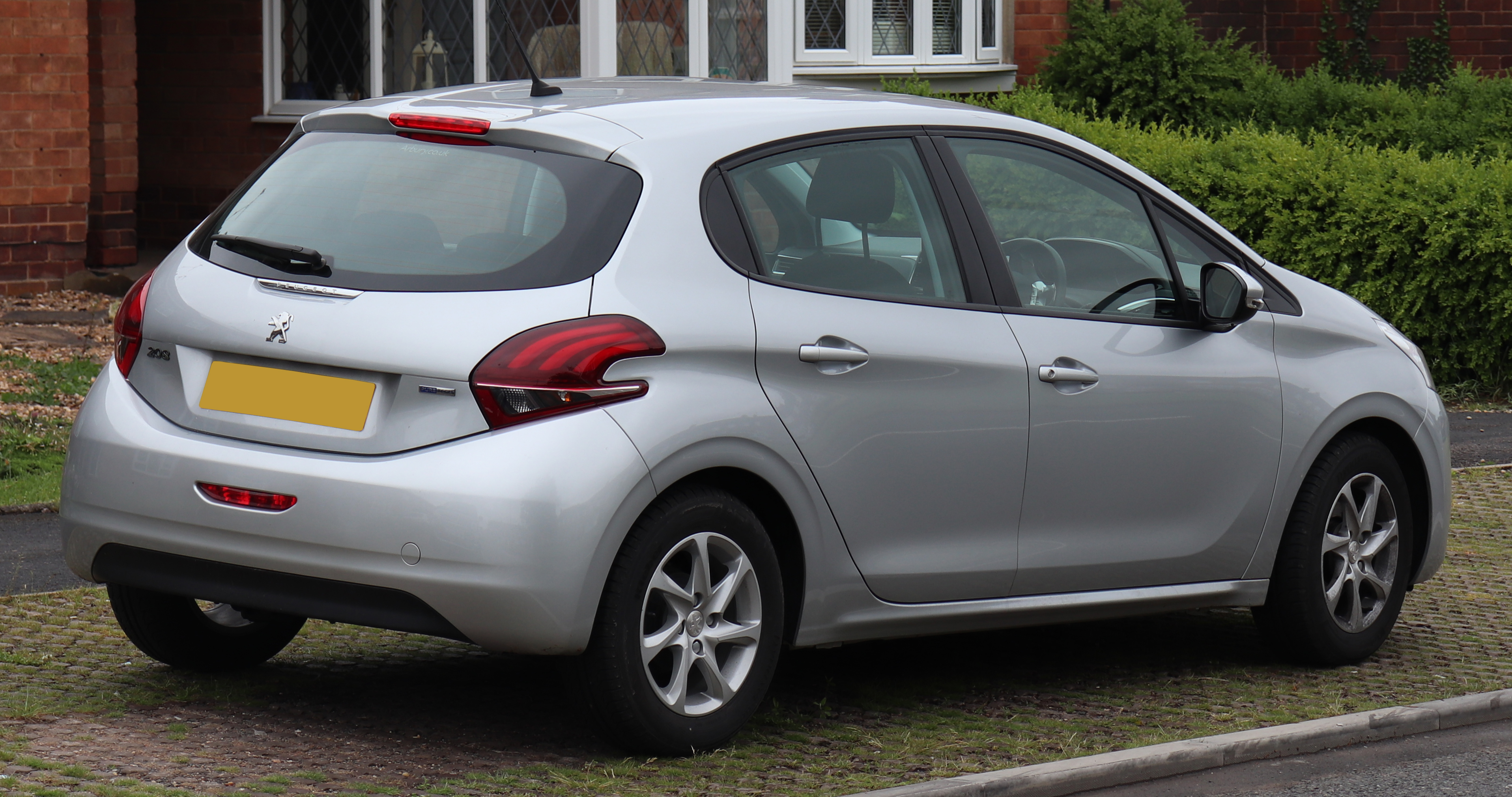
2017 208 1.2 Active 5-door hatchback (facelift; UK)

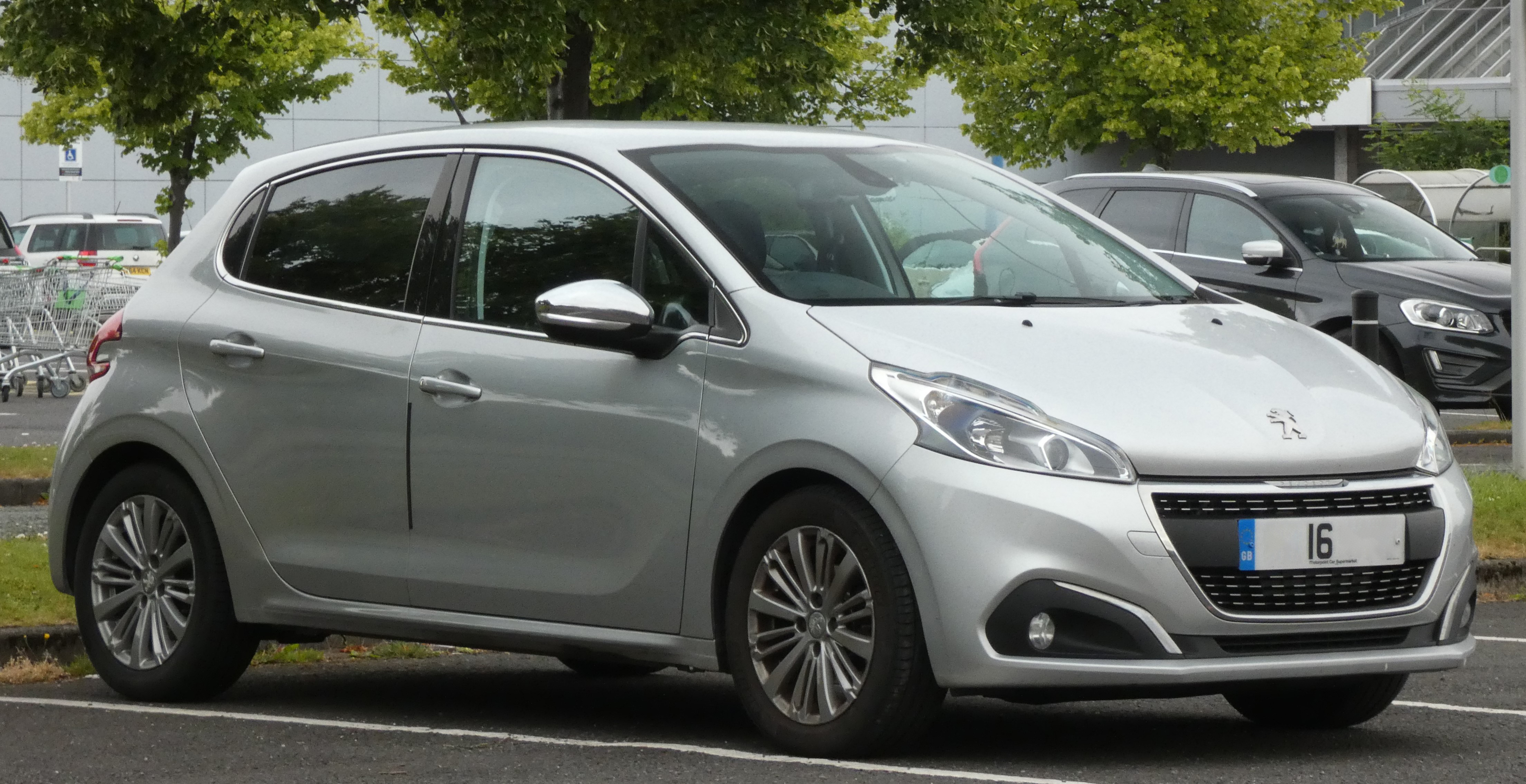
2016 208 1.2 Allure 5-door hatchback (facelift; UK)

=== 208 GTi ===
The 208 GTi was introduced in September 2012 as the performance model of the first-generation 208. Previously, it was showcased as a concept model in March 2012. Based on the three-door 208, the variant weighs 1,160 kg (2,557 lb), which is 90 kg (198 lb) lighter than the 207 GTi.

Compared to the standard 208, the front and rear tracks have been widened 10 mm (0.4 in) and 20 mm (0.8 in). Fitted with 17-inch alloy wheels with 205/45 tyre size, the 208 GTi is also equipped with a larger 302 mm (11.9 in) disc brakes at the front, cooled by functional vents. Its suspension has also been upgraded and the steering recalibrated appropriately.

The 208 GTi is fitted with a 1.6 litre turbo (1,598 cc) four cylinder in line turbo petrol Prince engine producing 147 kW (200 PS; 197 hp) at 5,800 rpm and 275 N⋅m (203 lb⋅ft) of torque at 1,700 rpm, and is fitted with a six-speed manual transmission. The GTi's Prince engine is shared with the Peugeot RCZ, several Mini and various Citroëns.

This first GTi model has since been replaced by the 208 GTi by PeugeotSport which is directly derived from the limited edition '30ème Anniversaire Edition' which put out 155 kW (208 hp) with revised suspension and an optional two tone paint along with a facelift of the original bumpers and other small changes.

Although a high-performance 208 R was planned for the lineup, it was never released. It would have been positioned above the 208 GTi.

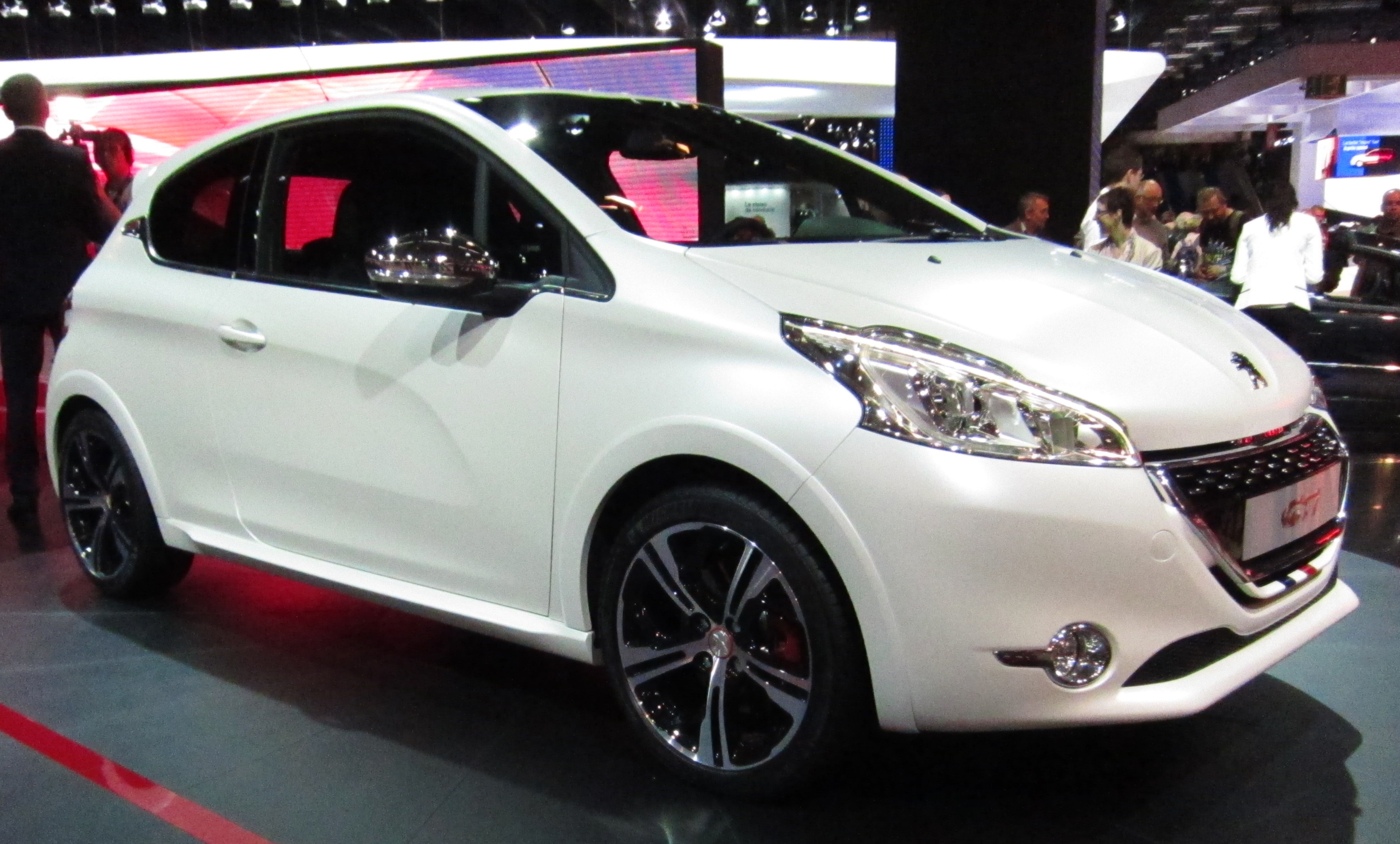
208 GTi (pre-facelift)

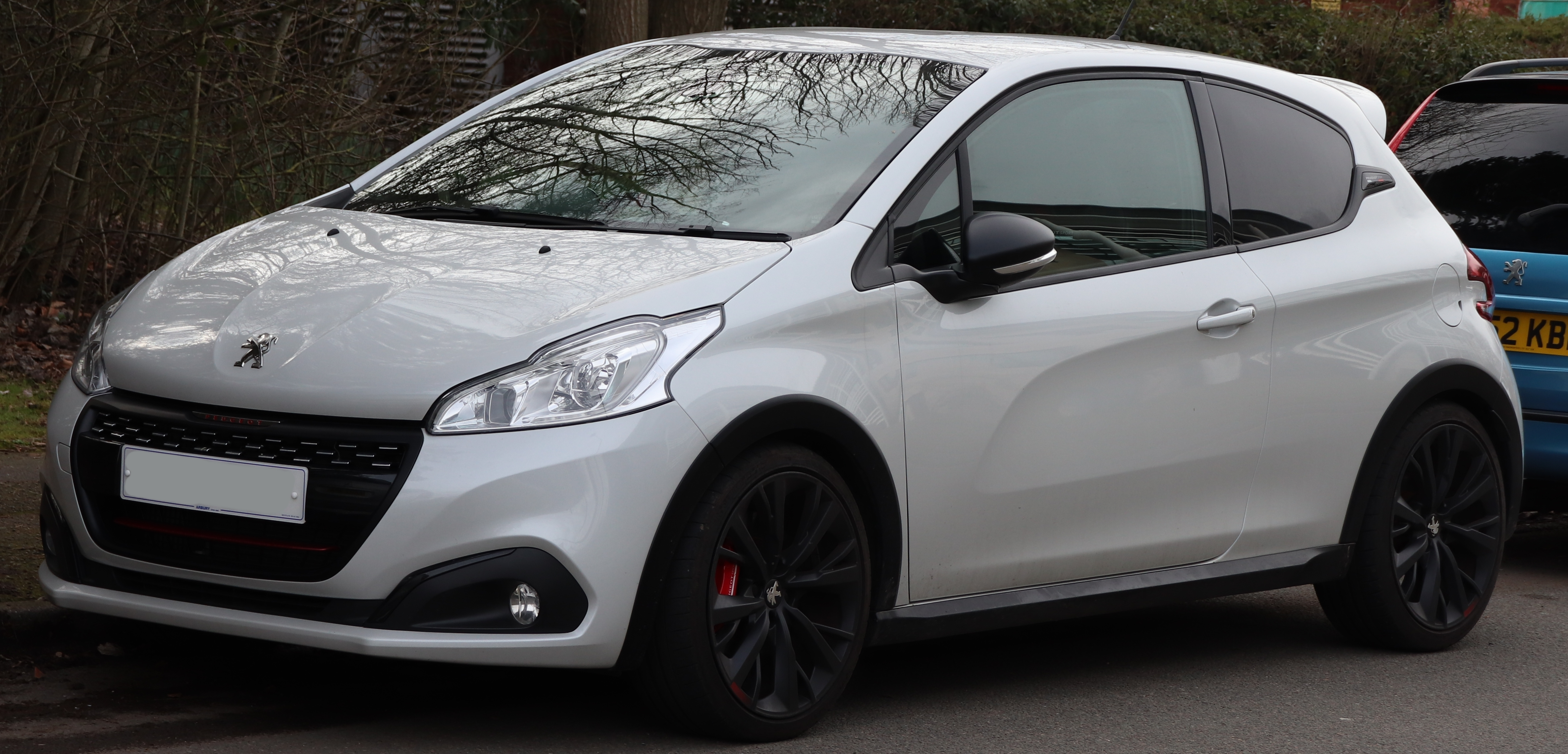
208 GTi (facelift)

==== 208 GTi 30th by Peugeot Sport ====
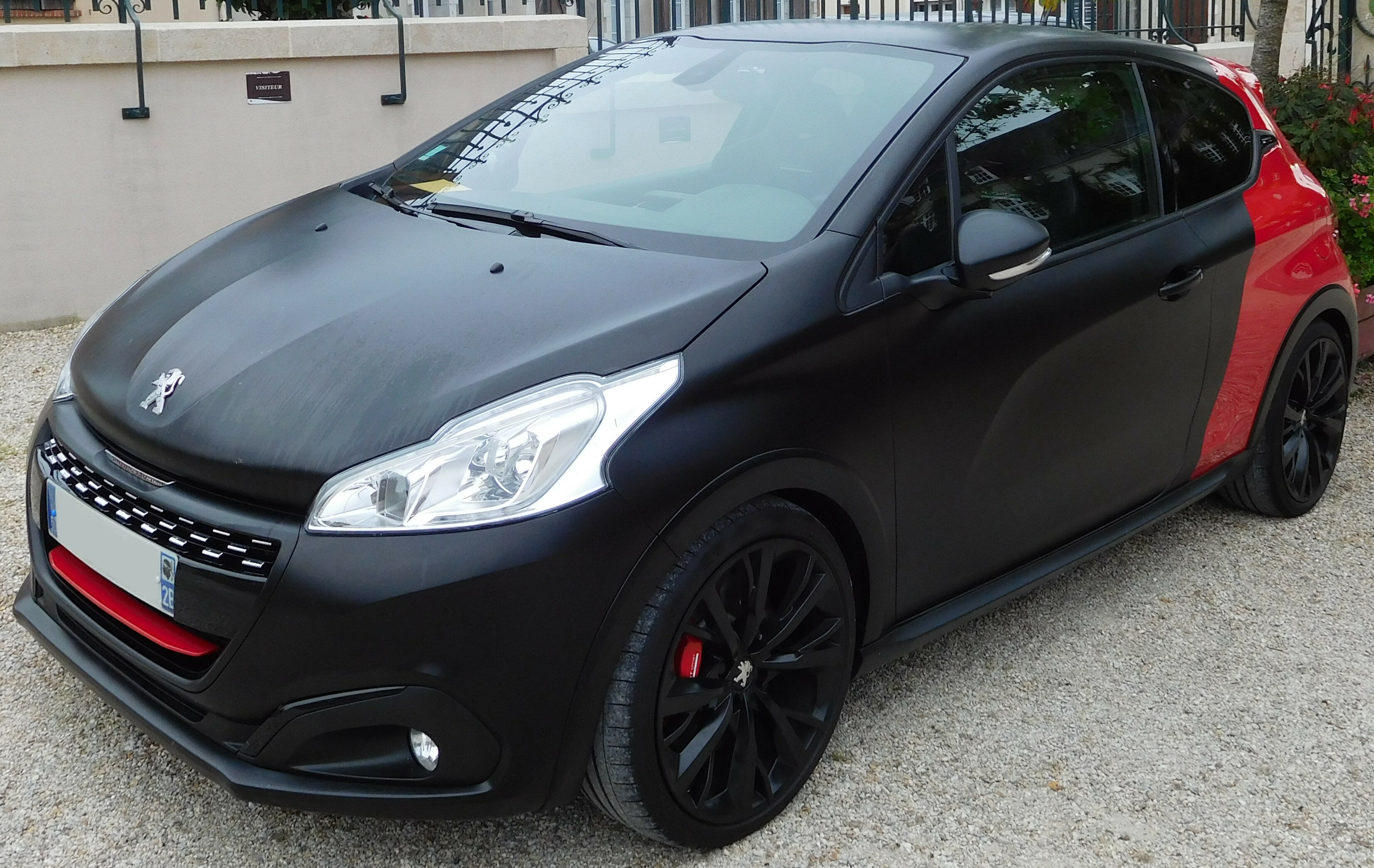
208 GTi 30th by Peugeot Sport

A limited edition "30th by Peugeot Sport" was launched to mark the 30th anniversary of the 205 GTi, launched in 1984. Equipped with a 153 kW (208 PS; 205 hp) engine, the model was tuned by Peugeot Sport, the brand's competition department. Improvements over the regular 208 GTi include a Torsen limited-slip differential from the RCZ R and performance-oriented suspension and steering settings. Braking is handled by front 323 mm (12.7 in) discs pinched by 4-piston fixed Brembo calipers.

The car was shown at the 2014 Goodwood Festival of Speed. It went on sale the following November in France

=== Powertrain ===
All the petrol engines comply with the Euro 5 norm and the diesel engines have CO_{2} emissions of 99 g/km or lower. In addition to the four cylinder petrol engines carried over from the previous model, from September 2012, the 208 has been offered with two new three cylinder units with variable valve timing – the 1.0 VTi producing 50 kW (68 PS; 67 hp) and 1.2 VTi 60 kW (82 PS; 81 hp).

The 1.0 comes with an advertised fuel consumption of 4.3 L/100 km (66 mpg_{‑imp}; 55 mpg_{‑US}), and a CO_{2} emissions value of 99 g/km. A 1.2 L three cylinder is available with a turbocharger designated as the PureTech 110 S&S (available on the GT Line models and the allures) or without designated PureTech 82 S&S (available on the active, VTi, or XS). This engine is coupled to a five speed manual or a six speed automatic.

The range of diesel units starts with the four-cylinder 1.4-litre e HDi unit, originally introduced in 2010 for the 207, which provides 50 kW (68 PS; 67 hp) of power coupled, in the 208, with published fuel economy and emission figures of 3.4 L/100 km (83 mpg_{‑imp}; 69 mpg_{‑US}) and 87 g/km.

==== 2012-2015 ====
Petrol engines
Model	Type	Power, Torque@rpm	0–100 km/h (0-62 mph) (s)	Top speed	Transmission	Kerb weight	Years
1.0 VTi	999 cc (61.0 cu in) I3	50 kW (68 PS) @ 6000 , 95 N⋅m (70 lb⋅ft) @ 3000	14	163 km/h (101 mph)	5-speed manual	975 kg (2,150 lb)	2012–2015
1.2 VTi	1,199 cc (73.2 cu in) I3	60 kW (82 PS) @ 6000 , 118 N⋅m (87 lb⋅ft) @ 2750	12.2	175 km/h (109 mph)	5-speed manual	975 kg (2,150 lb)	2012–2015
1.4 VTi	1,397 cc (85.3 cu in) I4	70 kW (95 PS) @ 6000 , 136 N⋅m (100 lb⋅ft) @ 4000	10.5	188 km/h (117 mph)	5-speed manual	1,070 kg (2,360 lb)	2012–2015
1.6 VTi	1,598 cc (97.5 cu in) I4	88 kW (120 PS) @ 6000 , 160 N⋅m (118 lb⋅ft) @ 4250	8.9	190 km/h (120 mph)	5-speed manual	1,090 kg (2,400 lb)	2012–2015
1.6 THP	1,598 cc (97.5 cu in) turbo I4	114 kW (155 PS) N/A, N/A	7.3	215 km/h (134 mph)	6-speed manual	1,165 kg (2,568 lb)	2012–2015
GTI (1.6 THP)	1,598 cc (97.5 cu in) turbo I4	147–153 kW (200–208 PS) @ 6800/5800 , 275 N⋅m (203 lb⋅ft) @ 1700/1700-3000	6.8/6.5	230 km/h (140 mph)	6-speed manual	1,160 kg (2,560 lb)	2013–2015
Diesel engines
1.4 HDi/e-HDi	1,397 cc (85.3 cu in) I4	50 kW (68 PS) @ 4000, 160 N⋅m (118 lb⋅ft) @ 1750	13.5	163 km/h (101 mph)	5-speed manual	1,050 kg (2,310 lb)	2012–2015
1.6 e-HDi	1,560 cc (95.2 cu in) turbo I4	68 kW (92 PS) @ 4000 , 230 N⋅m (170 lb⋅ft) @ 1750	10.9	185 km/h (115 mph)	5-speed manual	1,080 kg (2,380 lb)	2012–2015

==== 2015-2018 ====
Petrol engines
Model	Type	Power, Torque@rpm	0–100 km/h (0-62 mph) (s)	Top speed	Transmission	Kerb weight	Years
1.0 Puretech	999 cc (61.0 cu in) I3	50 kW (68 PS) @ 6000, 95 N⋅m (70 lb⋅ft) @ 3000	14	165 km/h (103 mph)	5-speed manual	960 kg (2,120 lb)	2015-2016
1.2 Puretech	1,199 cc (73.2 cu in) I3	50 kW (68 PS) @ 5750, 106 N⋅m (78 lb⋅ft) @ 2750	13.8	166 km/h (103 mph)	5-speed manual	960 kg (2,120 lb)	2016-2019
1.2 Puretech	1,199 cc (73.2 cu in) I3	60 kW (82 PS) @ 5750, 118 N⋅m (87 lb⋅ft) @ 2750	12.2	175 km/h (109 mph)	5-speed manual 5-speed automatic	960 kg (2,120 lb); 960 kg (2,120 lb) (AT)	2015-2018
1.2 Puretech	1,199 cc (73.2 cu in) I3	61 kW (83 PS) @ 5750, 118 N⋅m (87 lb⋅ft) @ 2750	13.6	175 km/h (109 mph)	5-speed manual	1,080 kg (2,380 lb)	2018-2019
1.2 Puretech	1,199 cc (73.2 cu in) turbo I3	81 kW (110 PS) @ 5500, 205 N⋅m (151 lb⋅ft) @ 1500	9.6	190 km/h (120 mph)	5-speed manual	1,060 kg (2,340 lb); 1,090 kg (2,400 lb) (AT)	2015-2018
1.2 Puretech	1,199 cc (73.2 cu in) turbo I3	81 kW (110 PS) @ 5500, 205 N⋅m (151 lb⋅ft) @ 1750	9.3	188 km/h (117 mph)	5-speed manual	1,075 kg (2,370 lb); 1,090 kg (2,400 lb) (AT)	2018-2019
1.6 THP	1,598 cc (97.5 cu in) turbo I4	153 kW (208 PS) @ 6000, 300 N⋅m (221 lb⋅ft) @ 3000	6.5	230 km/h (140 mph)	6-speed manual	1,160 kg (2,560 lb)	2015-2016
Diesel engines
1.5 BlueHDI	1,499 cc (91.5 cu in) turbo I4	75 kW (102 PS) @ 3500, 250 N⋅m (184 lb⋅ft) @ 1750	10.5	188 km/h (117 mph)	6-speed manual	1,080 kg (2,380 lb)	2018-2019
1.6 BlueHDI	1,560 cc (95.2 cu in) turbo I4	55 kW (75 PS) @ 3500, 230 N⋅m (170 lb⋅ft) @ 1750	13.3	171 km/h (106 mph)	5-speed manual	1,065 kg (2,348 lb)	2015-2018
1.6 BlueHDI	1,560 cc (95.2 cu in) turbo I4	74 kW (100 PS) @ 3750, 254 N⋅m (187 lb⋅ft) @ 1750	10.7	187 km/h (116 mph)	5-speed manual	1,090 kg (2,400 lb)	2015-2018
1.6 BlueHDI	1,560 cc (95.2 cu in) turbo I4	88 kW (120 PS) @ 3500, 285 N⋅m (210 lb⋅ft) @ 1750	9.4	190 km/h (120 mph)	6-speed manual	1,115 kg (2,458 lb)	2015-2018

=== Trims ===
The 208 comes with a range of trims and specs. Starting from the entry model as of 2019:

- Active – Available with either a 1.2L PureTech 82 S&S petrol engine or a 1.5L BlueHDi diesel engine, both come with a 5-speed manual.
- Signature (also known as the Allure) – Comes with the same engine and transmission as the Active but has different styling and wheels.
- Tech Edition – As well as coming with the same engine as the Active and Signature it also comes with a 1.2L PureTech 110 turbocharged engine with 5-speed manual or 6-speed automatic transmissions.
- GT-Line – This is the top of line model that is available from Peugeot. Coupled with the 1.2L 110 bhp engines with 6-speed automatic and 5-speed manual transmission as well as the 1.5 litre diesel. This trim offers all the styling of a hot hatch, it has 16-inch alloy wheels which are diamond cut.

Additional trims consist of the Access, Access Plus, Style, Lime, XY, GTI, GTI Prestige, GTI Limited Edition, GTI 30th Anniversary, Roland Garros, Intuitive, and the Feline. A number of models mentioned are limited.

=== Safety ===
==== ANCAP ====
ANCAP test results* Peugeot 208 5 door hatches with 4 cylinder engine (2012)
Test	Score
Overall	5 /5 stars
Frontal offset	14.22/16
Side impact	15.81/16
Pole	2/2
Seat belt reminders	2/3
Whiplash protection	Adequate
Pedestrian protection	Adequate
Electronic stability control	Standard

==== Euro NCAP ====
Euro NCAP test results* Peugeot 208, 1.4 diesel 'Active' (LHD) (2012)
Test	Points	%
Overall:	5 /5 stars	
Adult occupant:	31.8	88%
Child occupant:	38.5	78%
Pedestrian:	22	61%
Safety assist:	5.8	83%

==== Latin NCAP ====
The 208 in its most basic Latin American market configuration with 2 airbags received 4 stars for adult occupants and 3 stars for toddlers from Latin NCAP 1.0 in 2014.

Latin NCAP 1.5 test results Peugeot 208 + 2 Airbags (2014, similar to Euro NCAP 2002)
Test	Points	Stars
Adult occupant:	12.64/17.0	4 /5 stars
Child occupant:	28.13/49.00	3 /5 stars

The 208 in its most basic Latin American market configuration with 2 airbags and no ESC received 2 stars for adult occupants and 3 stars for toddlers from Latin NCAP 2.0 in 2016.

Latin NCAP 2.0 test results BYD F0 - NO Airbags (2016, based on Euro NCAP 2008)
Test	Points	Stars
Adult occupant:	18.27/34.0	2 /5 stars
Child occupant:	30.65/49.00	3 /5 stars

==== ASEAN NCAP ====
ASEAN NCAP test results Peugeot 208 (2013)
Test	Points	Stars
Adult occupant:	13.13	4 /5 stars
Child occupant:	72%	4 /5 stars
Safety assist:	NA	

== Second generation (P21; 2019) ==
Second generation
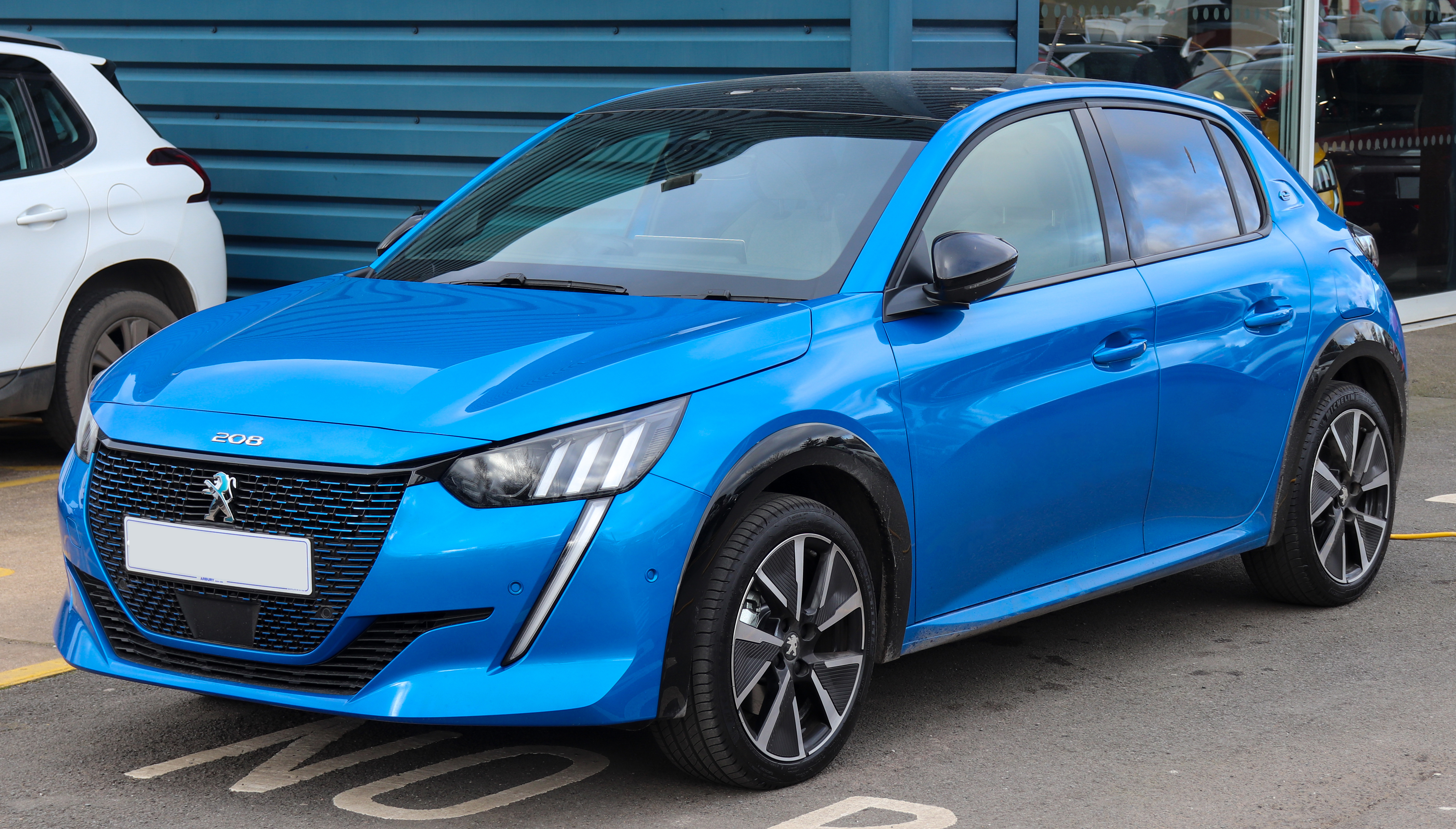
- Peugeot e-208 GT

Overview
- Model code: P21
- Production: 2019–present
- Assembly: Slovakia: Trnava (Trnava Plant); Spain: Zaragoza (Opel España de Automóviles); Morocco: Kenitra (Kenitra Plant); Argentina: El Palomar, Buenos Aires
- Designer: Kevin Gonçalves (exterior); Yann Beurel (exterior); Eric Dejou (interior)

Body and chassis
- Body style: 5-door hatchback
- Platform: CMP/eCMP
- Related: Peugeot 2008 (P24); Opel Corsa F; Opel Mokka B; DS 3 Crossback; Citroën C4 (2020); Lancia Ypsilon IV

Powertrain
- Engine: Petrol: 1.0 L FireFly I3 flex fuel (South America); 1.2 L EB2FA I3; 1.2 L EB2ADTD/EB2DTS turbo I3; 1.6 L EC5 I4 flex fuel (South America); Diesel: 1.5 L DV5 BlueHDi I4; 1.6 L DV6 D HDI I4 (Morocco)
- Electric motor: Permanent magnet synchronous motor (e-208)
- Transmission: 5-speed manual; 6-speed Aisin AWF-21 manual; 8-speed Aisin AWF8F35 automatic; 1-speed direct-drive fixed gear ratio (e-208)
- Battery: 50 kWh lithium-ion (e-208)
- Electric range: 349 km (217 mi)

Dimensions
- Wheelbase: 2,540 mm (100.0 in)
- Length: 4,055 mm (159.6 in)
- Width: 1,745 mm (68.7 in)
- Height: 1,430 mm (56.3 in)

The second-generation 208 was unveiled at the Geneva Motor Show in March 2019, and officially went on sale across Europe over the summer. A fully electric version, named e-208, was also revealed at Geneva.

Since this generation, the 208 switches from the older PF1 platform to the Common Modular Platform (CMP). The newer platform, which is shared with the 2008, the DS 3 Crossback and Opel Corsa, allowed Peugeot's engineers to reduce around 30 kg (66 lb) from the vehicle's weight. The newly developed platform also enhanced the vehicle's aerodynamics and comfort, as noise, vibration, and harshness (NVH) levels are claimed to be reduced compared to its predecessor.

The 208's interior has also been updated with Peugeot's i-Cockpit, featuring a digital instrument cluster, smaller steering wheel design and a touchscreen display available in various sizes. Physical buttons and switches have been minimized, as most of the controls have been integrated into the infotainment system. It is also available with optional advanced driver-assistance systems, featuring adaptive cruise control, lane centering, automatic parking, and blind spot monitoring. Models equipped with a manual transmission feature cruise control down to a minimum speed of 18 mph (29 km/h); the automatic and e-208 models can control the car down to a stop.

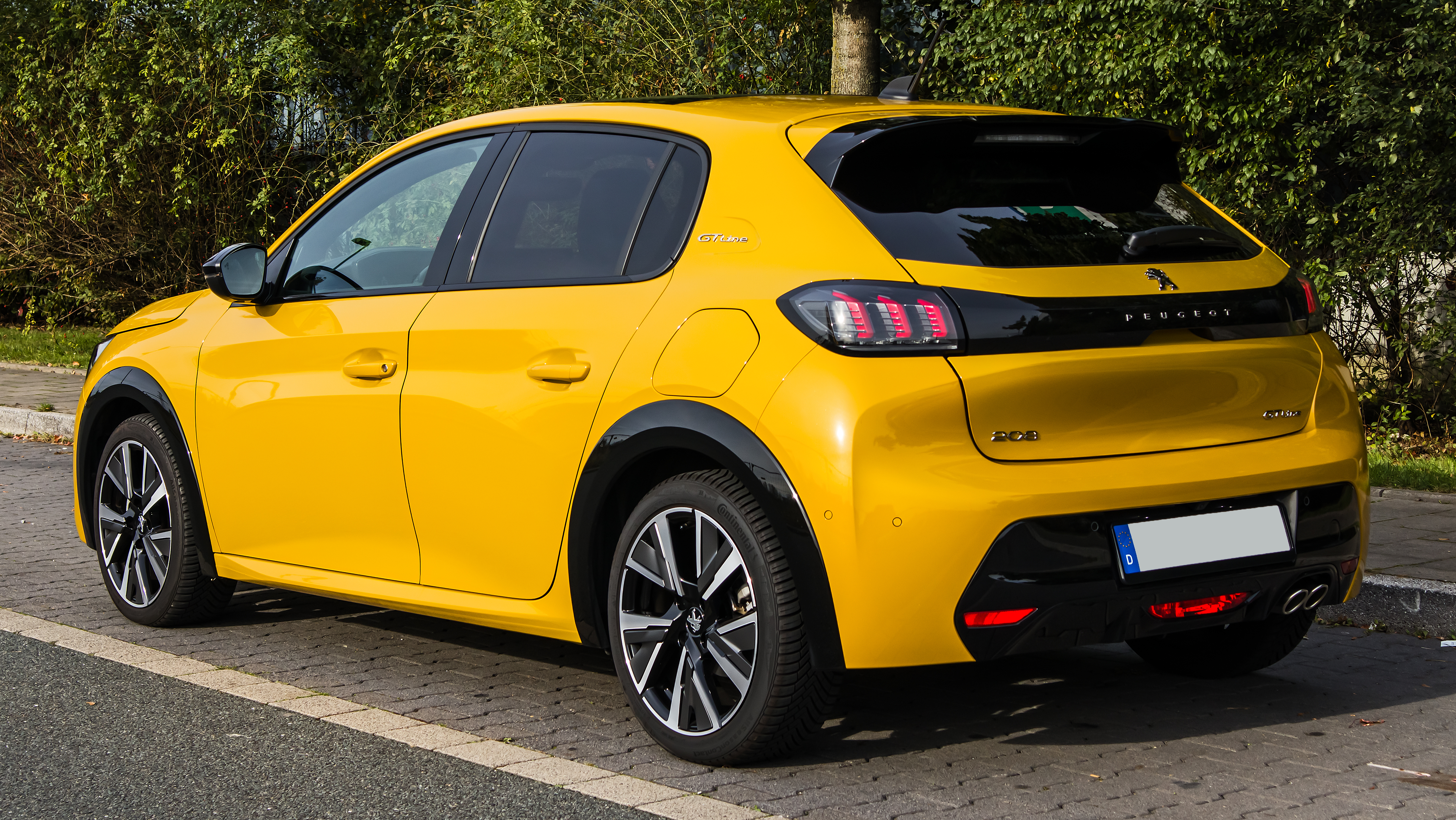
Rear view (GT Line)

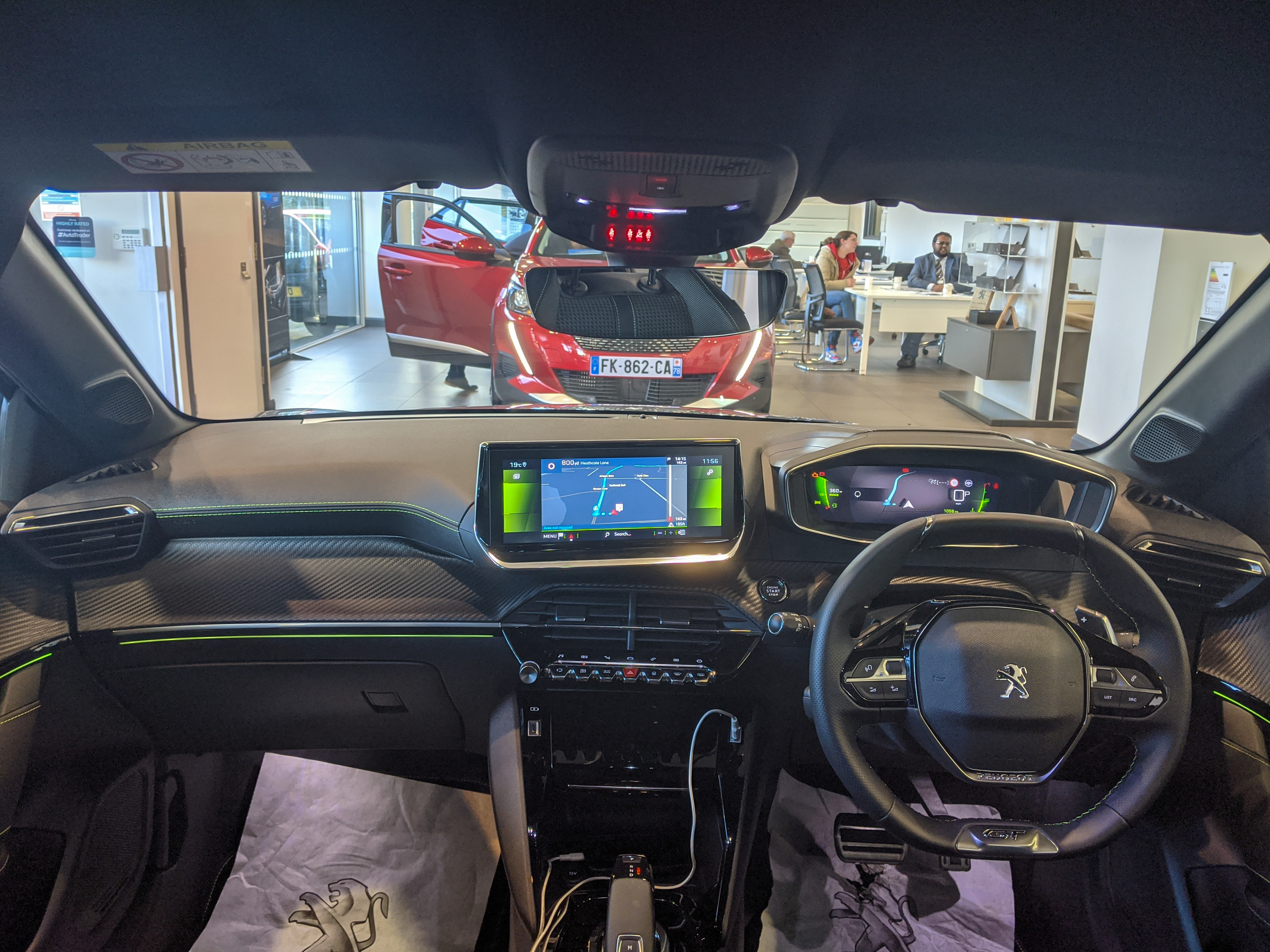
Interior (GT Line)

=== Technical ===
The 208 offers a choice of powertrains, using conventional petrol or diesel engines, or an electric motor. The conventional petrol engines branded "PureTech" are all 1.2-litre, three-cylinder naturally aspirated EB2FA with 74 hp (55 kW; 75 PS), or turbo EB2DT with 100 hp (75 kW; 101 PS), or turbo EB2DTS with 129 hp (96 kW; 131 PS), except the versions made in Argentina which use the 1.6-litre naturally-aspirated EC5 either petrol-only or ethanol-capable flex fuel for export to Brazil.

The diesel model will come in just one engine variant, a 1.5-litre four cylinder engine producing 75 kW (102 PS; 101 hp). Moroccan buyers have the option of the older 1.6 HDi engine producing 92 PS (68 kW; 91 hp). Peugeot have yet to announce the Sport models and what engine they will be using, such as the GTi which has been part of the family of the 208.

However, Guillaume Clerc, the project manager for the second generation 208, stated that development of a petrol 208 GTi ended in 2017, because it was impossible to meet the corporate average CO_{2} emission targets with the larger 1.6-litre engine used in the previous generation 208 GTi. Clerc hinted the next GTi could be based on the e-208. The e-208 GTi was revealed in 2025.

=== e-208 ===
Since the introduction of the second-generation 208, Peugeot also offers a battery electric version called the e-208. Unlike competing contemporary vehicles such as the Renault Zoe and Volkswagen ID.3, the e-208 shares a common chassis with the conventional petrol/diesel powered 208. Peugeot chose this deliberately to enable potential buyers to select the drivetrain that best suits their requirements. It also allows Peugeot to assemble the e-208 on the same line as the 208, at the Slovak Trnava plant.

Compared to the conventionally powered versions of the 208, the e-208 is approximately 350 kg (770 lb) heavier, and has a slightly wider rear axle, to accommodate the battery pack.

The e-208 has a heat-pump controlled 50 kWh battery, a 100 kW (136 PS; 134 hp) motor, and a 6.6 kW charger. WLTP range is 340 km (211 mi). It is equipped with a CCS Combo Type 2 connector, or CHAdeMO in Japan, and can charge at a rate of up to 100 kW from a suitable DC fast charging station. Charge rate can be 70 kW up to 40% state of charge, then decreasing to 50 kW. The onboard charger is limited to 7.4 kW, but may be equipped with a three phase 11 kW charger as an option. In the e-208, the gear selector is used to choose the level of regenerative braking.

Shortly after it went on sale in October 2019, demand for the e-208 was reported as strong. Peugeot had anticipated making approximately 30,000 e-208 cars per year, 10 percent of the planned annual production of 300,000 for the entire 208 product line, but 1/4 of all pre-orders received were for the e-208. Maximum annual production for the e-208 is 60,000 units.

The electric e-208 was voted "Most Desired Electric Car" in North Macedonia at the Golden Steering Wheel awards at the beginning of 2021.

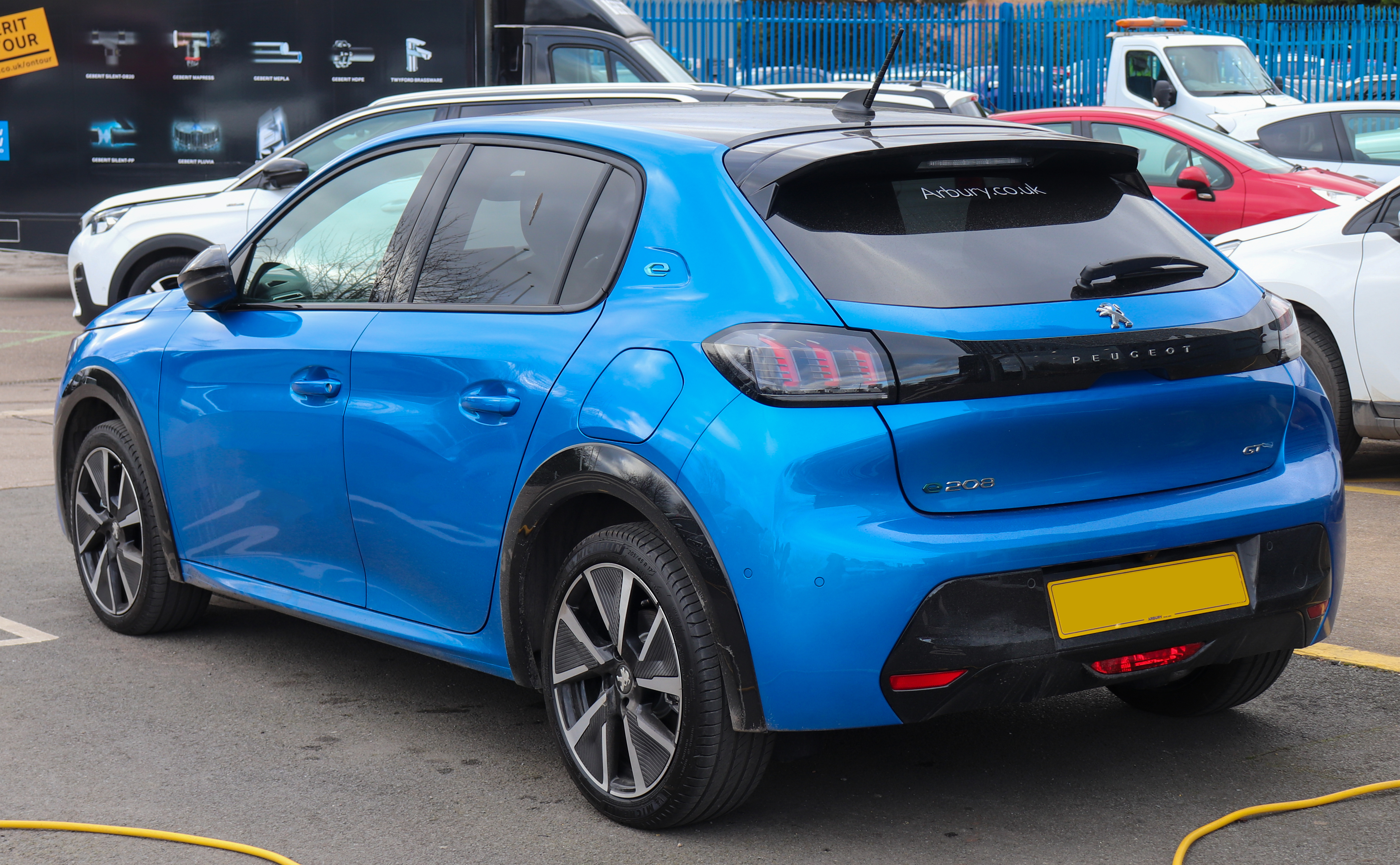
Rear view (e-208 GT)

=== Facelift ===
In July 2023, Peugeot announced a facelift for the second generation 208.

The updated model has a new front end with new headlights, front apron and grille, while it receives new tail lights in the back. LED headlights and partial LED tail lights became standard, with full LED options available. The grille maintains its overall proportions but has new designs with body coloured elements (except for the base trim) and the apron incorporated three vertical lines as the new light signature and DRLs. New colours are also available.

In the interior, the infotaintment system became equipped with a 10-inch display as standard (as opposed to 7-inch in the pre-facelift model), but the cockpit remains analogue for the base trim. New fabrics are also available.

The PureTech 75 and 100 engines with manual gearboxes remain in the lineup, while the automatic PureTech 100 and 130 get a new 48V hybrid system which can run in electric mode at times. The e-208 has a new powertrain which outputs 115 kW (154 hp) and has an increased range of 400 km (250 mi).

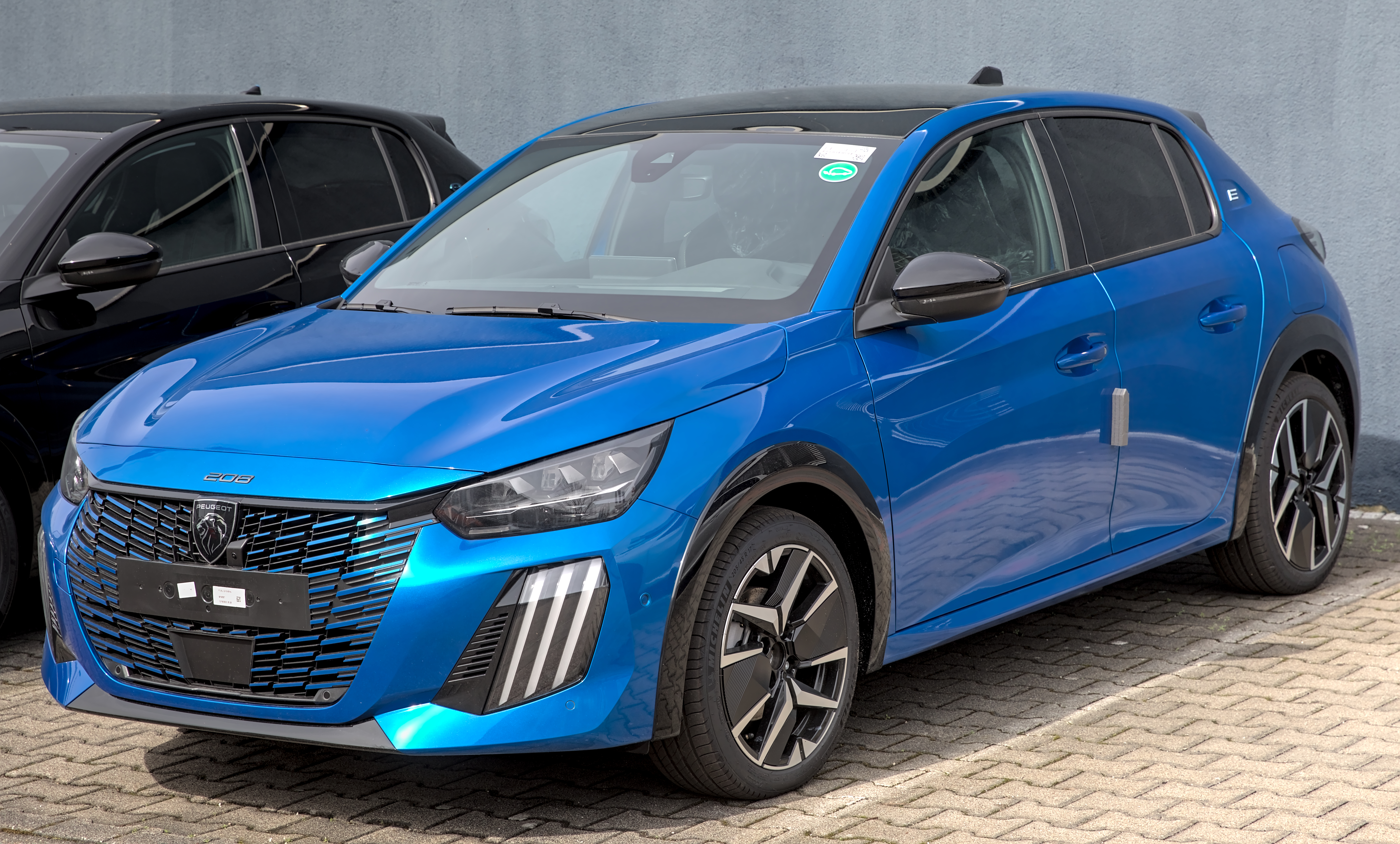
e-208 GT (facelift)

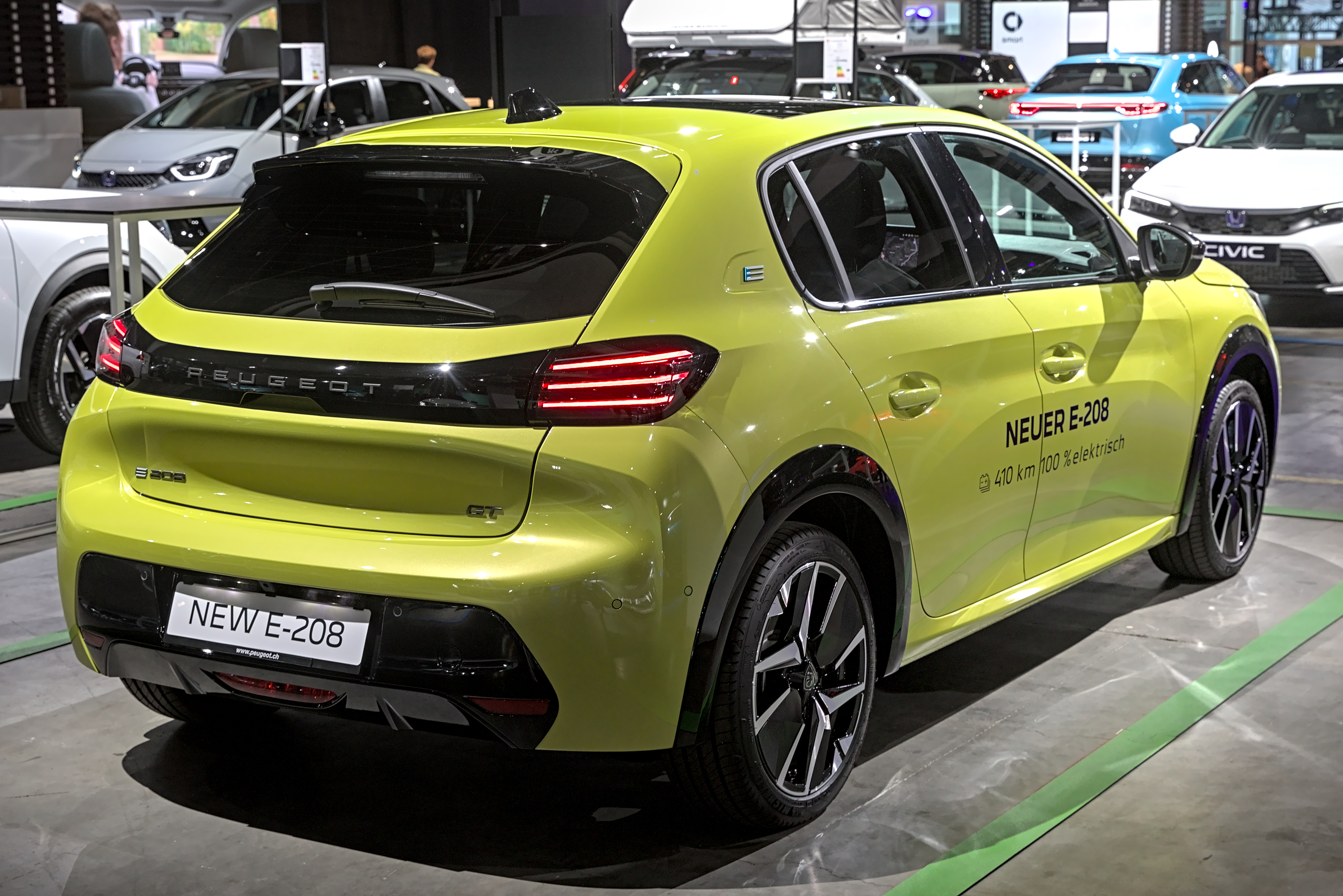
Rear view

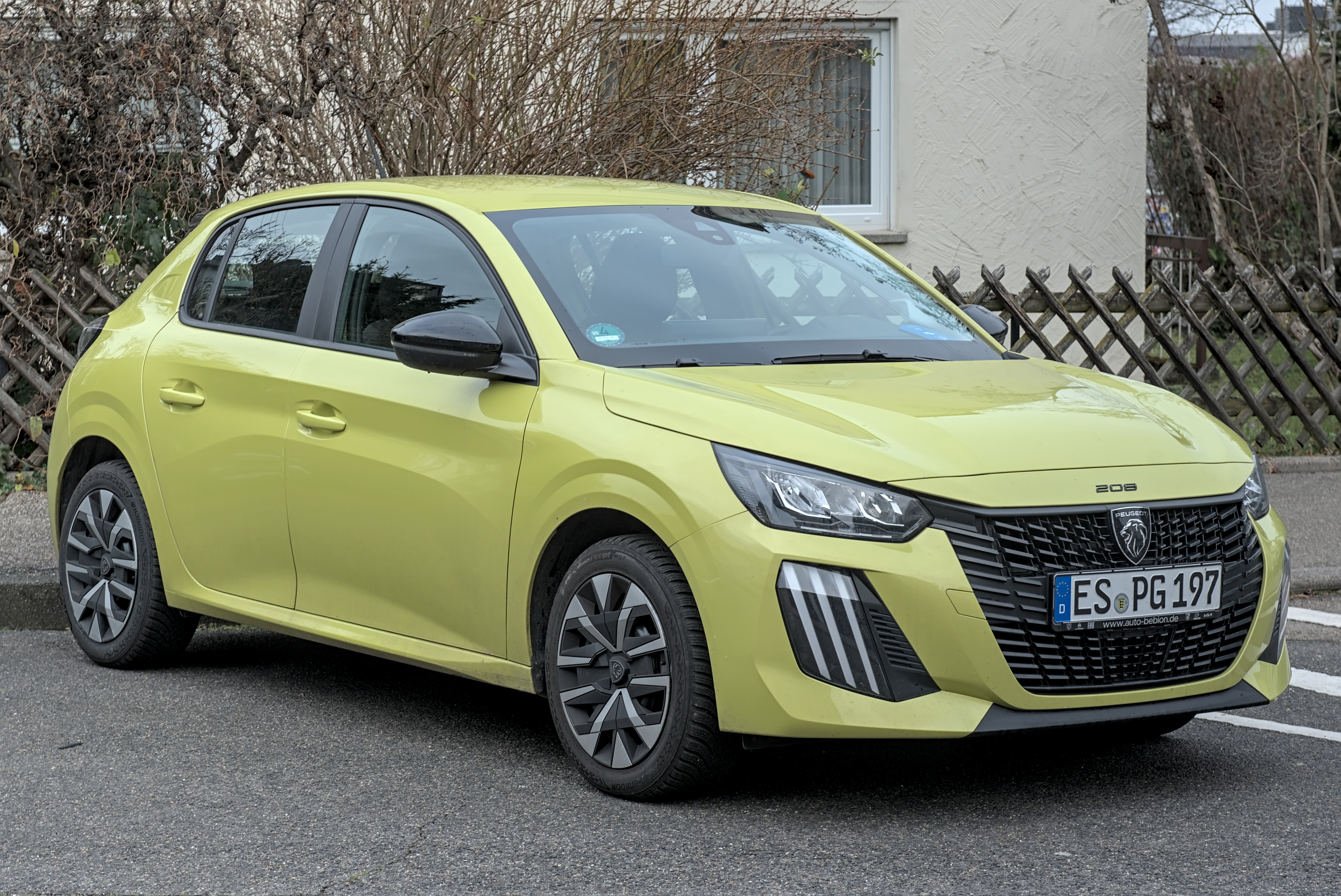
208 (facelift)

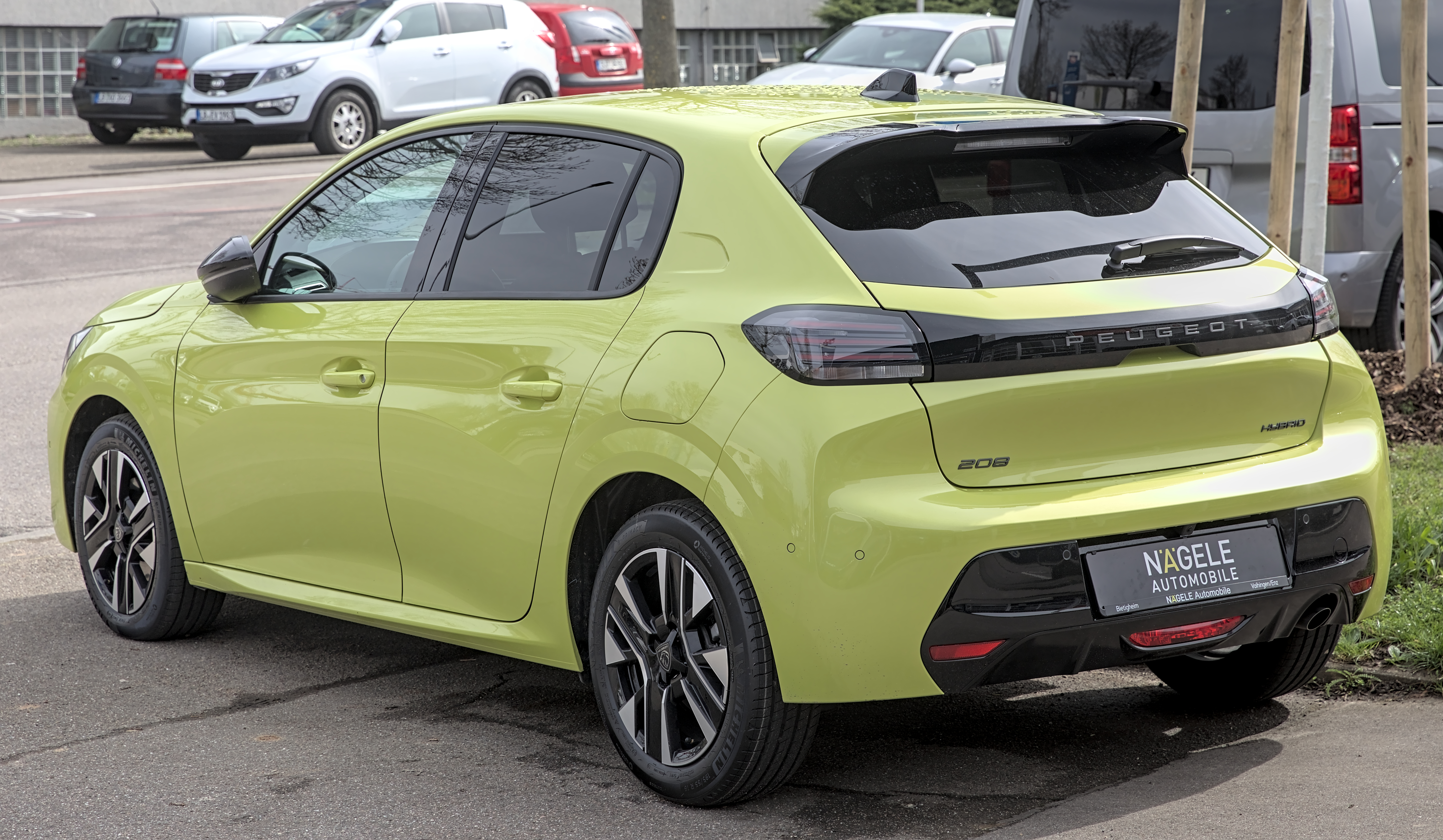
Rear view

=== e-208 GTI ===
Peugeot unveiled the E-208 GTI at the 2025 24 Hours of Le Mans in France, bringing the GTI badge back to its lineup after a six-year absence and using it on an electric car, with the e-208 GTI sharing much with the Abarth 600e Scorpionissima and Alfa Romeo Junior Veloce.

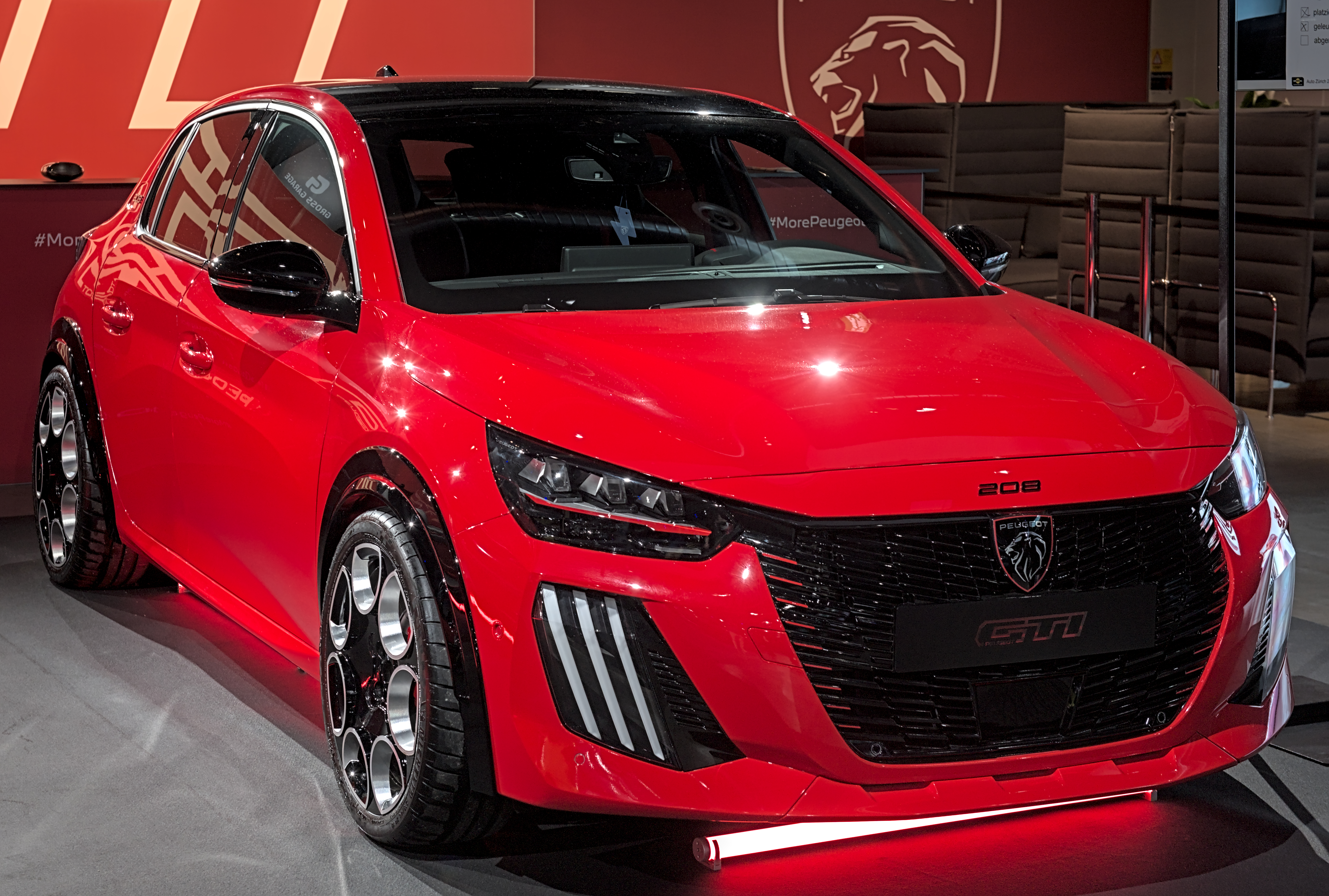
e-208 GTI

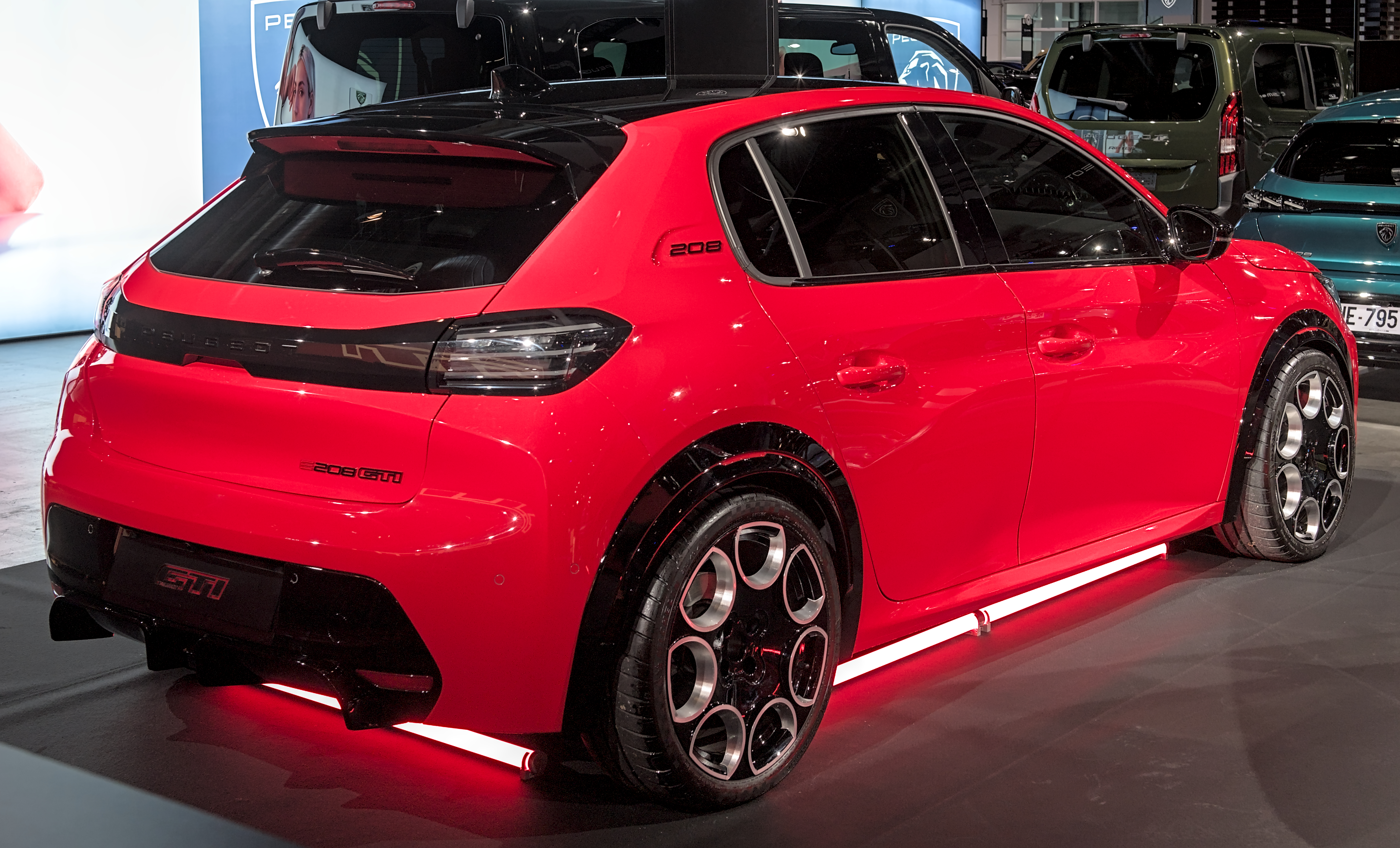
Rear view

=== South American assembly ===
In July 2020, Peugeot started the assembly of the second-generation 208 in Argentina in its Buenos Aires plant. The vehicles produced at the plant are intended for South American market, with 60 percent exported outside Argentina. Only internal combustion models are produced there, as the e-208s sold in South America are imported.

In 2020, the Argentinian-made 208 was claimed to be 95 percent equal to the European version (with a different engine and other parts), while 40% of its parts are made in Argentina. The South American model are engineered with a higher ground clearance (+10 to 12 mm) and a higher approach angle (16 degrees instead of 14 degrees) to adapt to the more rugged local roads compared to European ones. It also uses less expensive materials, such as using steel instead of aluminum. Other differences include different rear seats and a larger fuel tank.

The Argentinian-made 208 is equipped with the 1.6-litre EC5F engine producing 114 PS (84 kW). In May 2022, following the merger of PSA and FCA to form Stellantis, Peugeot released a naturally-aspirated 1.0-litre 208 as an entry-level option for the Brazilian market. This model uses the Firefly engine from the Fiat Argo, rated at 71 or 75 PS (52 or 55 kW) depending on whether it uses petrol or ethanol. Naturally-aspirated 1.0 engines represent most of the B-hatch segment sales in Brazil.

Since the second half of 2022, a portion of the 208s sold in Chile are from Argentina (in addition to European imports).

In September 2023, a third engine was added to the Brazilian range, which is a 1.0-litre Turbo 200 130 PS (96 kW) from Fiat.

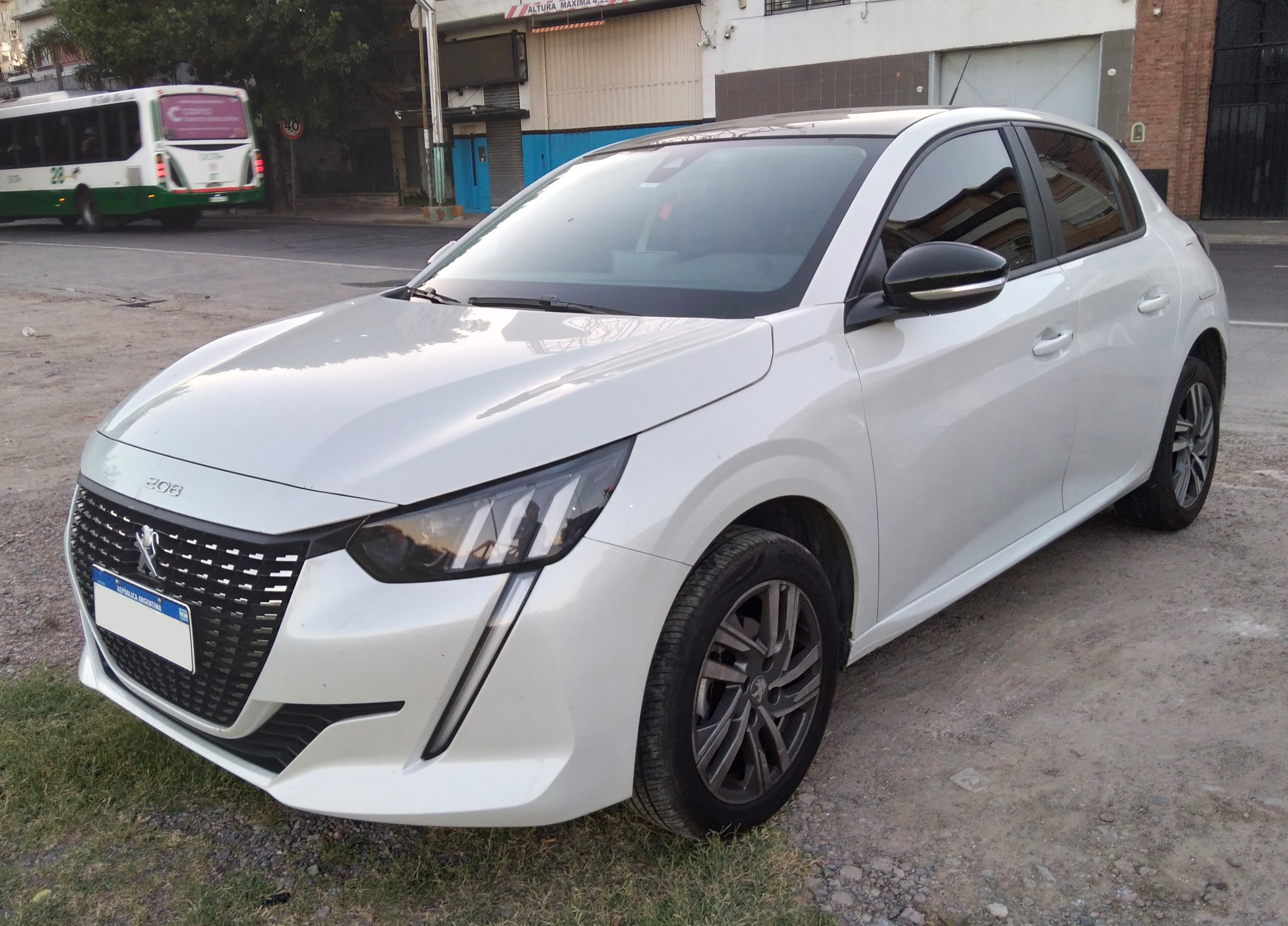
2023 Peugeot 208 1.6 Feline (Argentina)

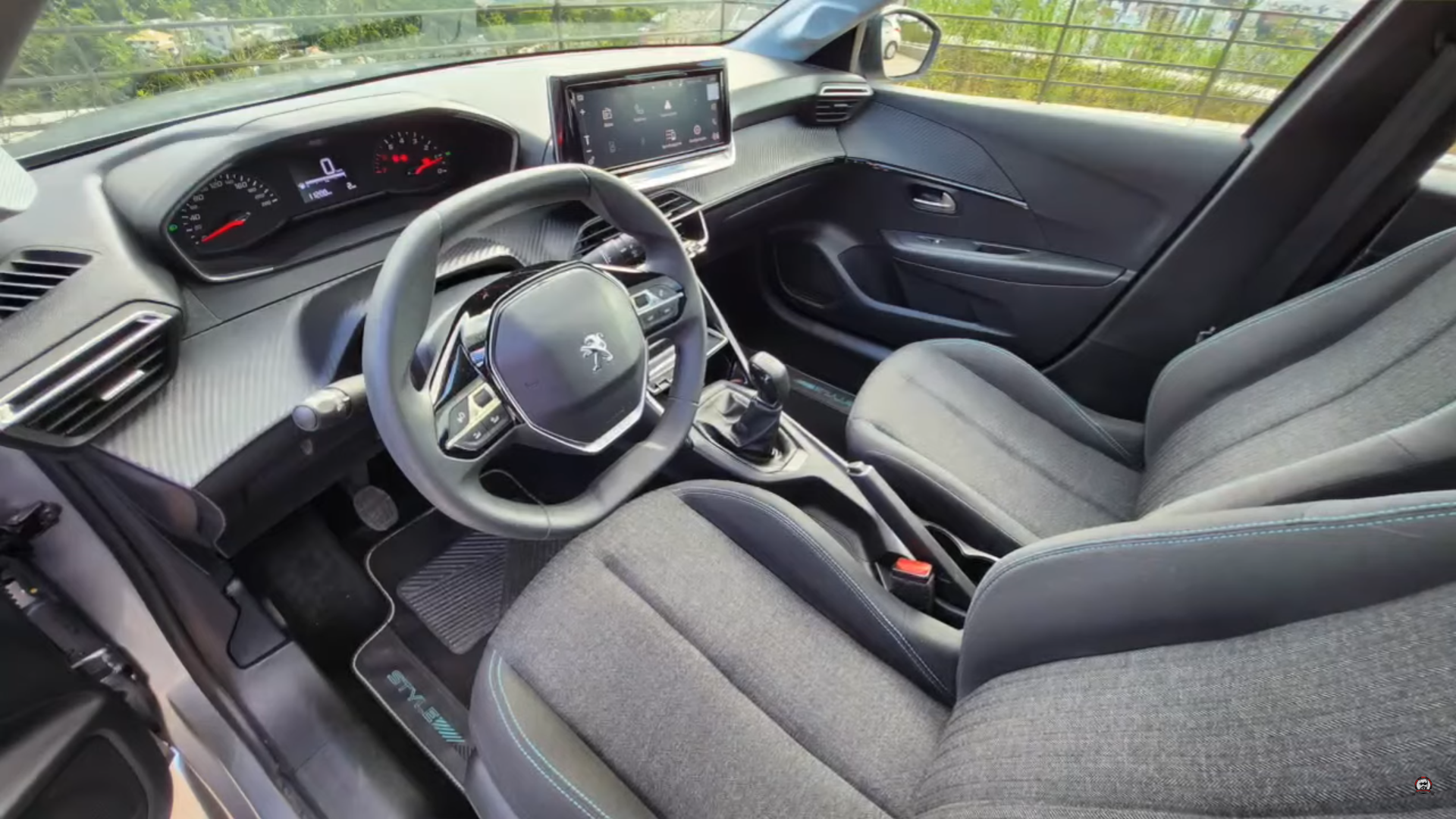
Interior

=== Powertrain (Europe) ===
Petrol engines
Model	Type	Power, Torque@rpm	0–100 km/h (0-62 mph) (s)	Top speed	Transmission	CO_{2} emission (g/km)	Years
1.2 PureTech 75 S&S	1,199 cc (73.2 cu in) I3	75 PS (55 kW; 74 hp) @ 5750, 118 N⋅m (87 lb⋅ft) @ 2750	13.2	102 mph (164 km/h)	5 speed manual	93–98	2019–
1.2 PureTech 100 S&S	1,199 cc (73.2 cu in) I3	100 PS (74 kW; 99 hp) @ 5500, 205 N⋅m (151 lb⋅ft) @ 1750	9.9	117 mph (188 km/h)	6 speed manual	96–102	2019–
1.2 PureTech 100 EAT8 S&S	1,199 cc (73.2 cu in) I3	100 PS (74 kW; 99 hp) @ 5500, 205 N⋅m (151 lb⋅ft) @ 1750	10.8	117 mph (188 km/h)	8 speed automatic	97–104	2019–
1.2 PureTech 130 EAT8 S&S	1,199 cc (73.2 cu in) I3	130 PS (96 kW; 128 hp) @ 5500, 230 N⋅m (170 lb⋅ft) @ 1750	8.7	129 mph (208 km/h)	8 speed automatic	101–108	2019–
Diesel engine
1.5 BlueHDi 100	1,499 cc (91.5 cu in) I4	102 PS (75 kW; 101 hp) @ 3500, 250 N⋅m (184 lb⋅ft) @ 1750	10.2	117 mph (188 km/h)	6 speed manual	84–92	2019–
Electric motor (e-208)
Battery		Power, Torque	0–100 km/h (s)	Top speed	Transmission	Range (WLTP)	Years
50 kWh lithium-ion		136 PS (100 kW; 134 hp), 260–300 N⋅m (192–221 lb⋅ft)	8.1	93 mph (150 km/h)	1 speed automatic	340 km (211 mi)	2019–2021
50 kWh lithium-ion		136 PS (100 kW; 134 hp), 260–300 N⋅m (192–221 lb⋅ft)	N/A	93 mph (150 km/h)	1 speed automatic	362 km (225 mi)	2021–2023
51 kWh lithium-ion		156 PS (115 kW; 154 hp), 260–300 N⋅m (192–221 lb⋅ft)	N/A	N/A	1 speed automatic	400 km (249 mi)	2023–present

=== Safety ===
==== ANCAP ====
ANCAP test results* Peugeot 208 5 door hatches with 4 cylinder engine (2012)
Test	Score
Overall	5 /5 stars
Frontal offset	14.22/16
Side impact	15.81/16
Pole	2/2
Seat belt reminders	2/3
Whiplash protection	Adequate
Pedestrian protection	Adequate
Electronic stability control	Standard

==== Euro NCAP ====
Euro NCAP test results* Peugeot 208 1.2 Puretech 75 (LHD) (2019)
Test	Points	%
Overall:	4 /5 stars	
Adult occupant:	34.7	91%
Child occupant:	42.5	86%
Pedestrian:	26.9	56%
Safety assist:	9.2	71%

==== Latin NCAP ====
The 208 in its most basic Latin American market configuration with 4 airbags and ISA received 2 stars from Latin NCAP 3.0 in 2021 (similar to Euro NCAP 2014).

Latin NCAP 3.0 test results Peugeot 208 + 4 Airbags (2021, similar to Euro NCAP 2014)
Test	Points	%
Overall:	2 /5 stars	
Adult occupant:	20.61	52%
Child occupant:	0.00	55%
Pedestrian:	25.98	54%
Safety assist:	24.00	56%

== Sales ==
Peugeot announced the 300,000th 208 was produced in February 2013.

Year	Europe	Brazil	Worldwide production	Worldwide sales	Notes
2011	198	—N/a	TBA	631	
2012	160,047	—N/a	242,900	220,800	Total production reaches 243,600 units.
2013	237,266	20,715	333,800	334,439	Total production reaches 577,400 units.
2014	214,547	23,523			
2015	228,088	13,334			
2016	247,379	10,769			
2017	242,589	12,157			
2018	230,107	7,093			
2019	224,848	5,608			
2020	199,316	4,403			
2021	195,728	16,345			
2022	206,816	29,879			
2023		28,634			
2024		17,717			
2025		9,812			

== Motorsport ==
=== 208 T16 Pikes Peak ===
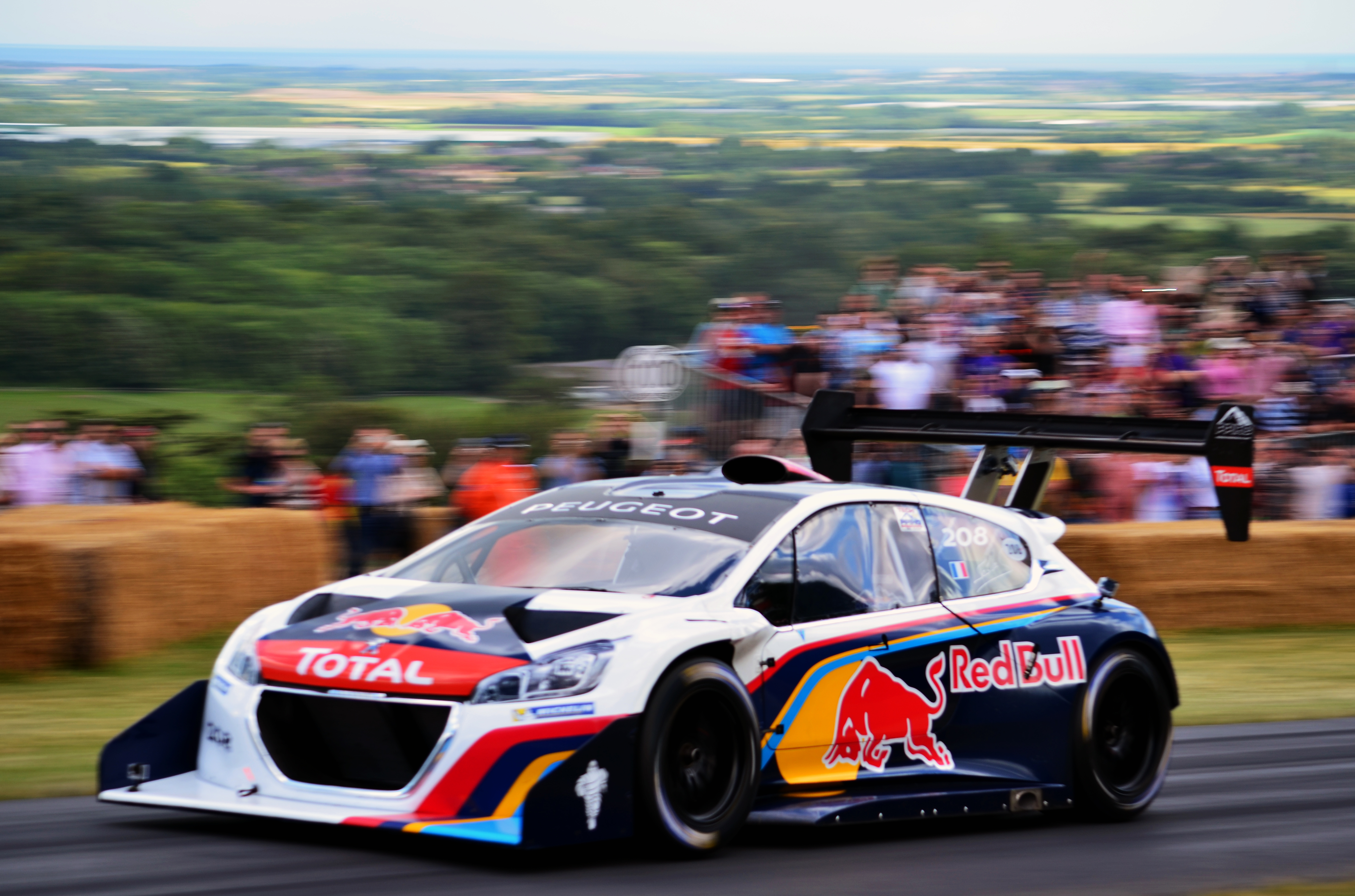
Sébastien Loeb driving the Peugeot 208 T16 Pikes Peak at the 2014 Goodwood Festival of Speed

In April 2013, a 208 T16 was tested by Sébastien Loeb at Mont Ventoux. Loosely based on the shape and design of the production 208, the T16 is a lightweight 875 kg (1,929 lb) vehicle that uses the rear wing from the Peugeot 908, and has a 3.2 litre, twin turbo V6 engine, developing 875 bhp (652 kW; 887 PS), allowing it to accelerate from 0–100 km/h in 1.8 seconds, with the aim of competing at the Pikes Peak International Hill Climb. The engine was derived from racing variants of the PSA ES/L V6 built by Sodemo, which were used in the Courage C60 Le Mans race car between 2001 and 2003.

At Pikes Peak on 30 June 2013, Sébastien Loeb used the 208 T16 to break Rhys Millen's record time, set in 2012 on the first fully paved roads in the history of the competition. The previous record of 9:46.164 was shattered, and a new record time of 8:13.878 was set.

The car also won the hillclimbing race, at the 2014 Goodwood Festival of Speed in June 2014.

=== Racing ===
In 2018, a Peugeot 208 GTi 30th Edition model won the overall award in the inaugural Classic Sports Car Club Turbo Tin Tops Series, for forced induction front wheel drive cars.

=== Rallycross ===
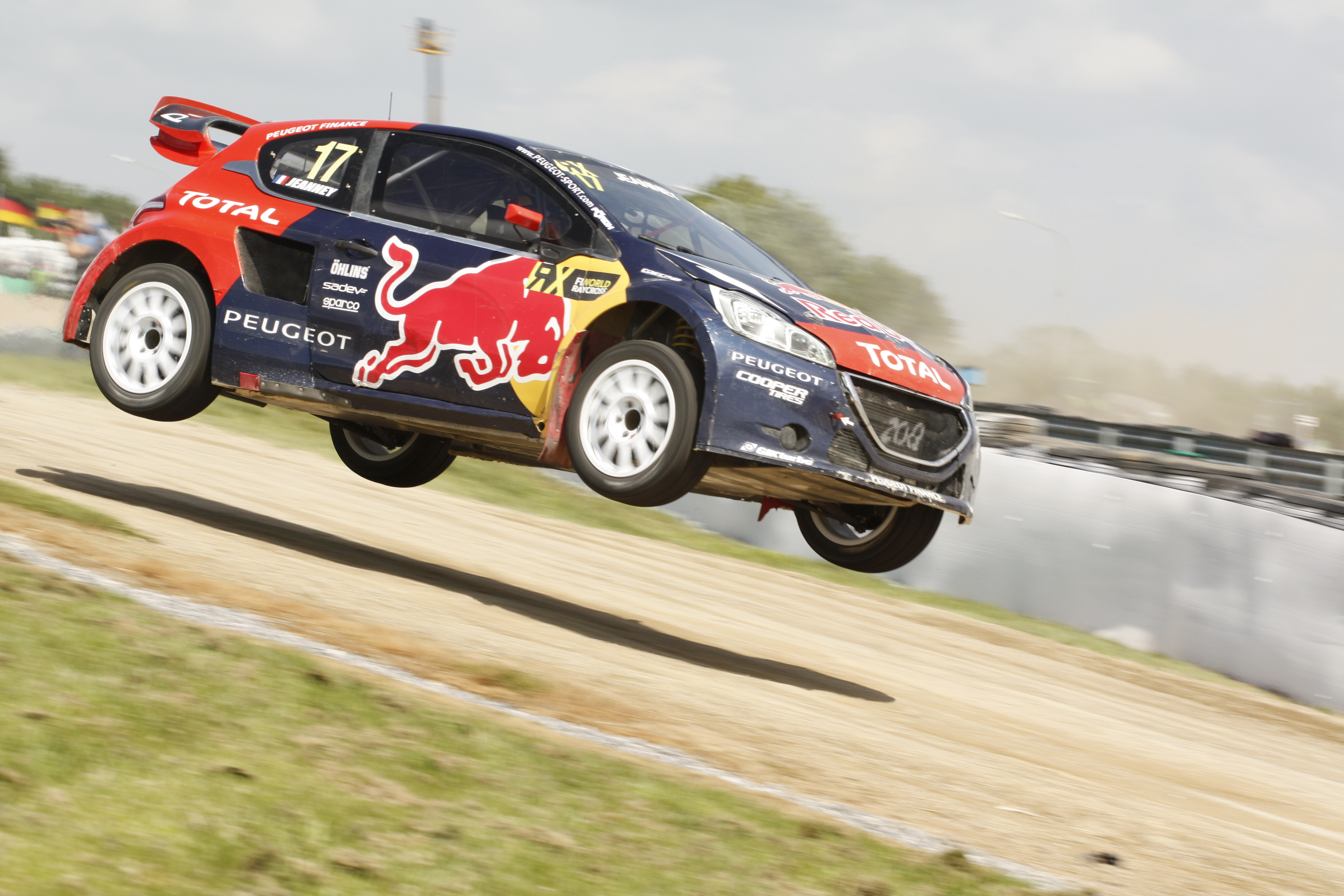
Peugeot 208 WRX

Team Peugeot-Hansen won the manufacturers title at the FIA World Rallycross Championship in November 2015. Jérôme Grosset-Janin was runner up in the FIA European Rallycross Championship in the same year.

Timmy Hansen won the 2019 FIA World Rallycross Championship using a Peugeot 208, and Hansen MJP won the teams championship.

=== Rally ===
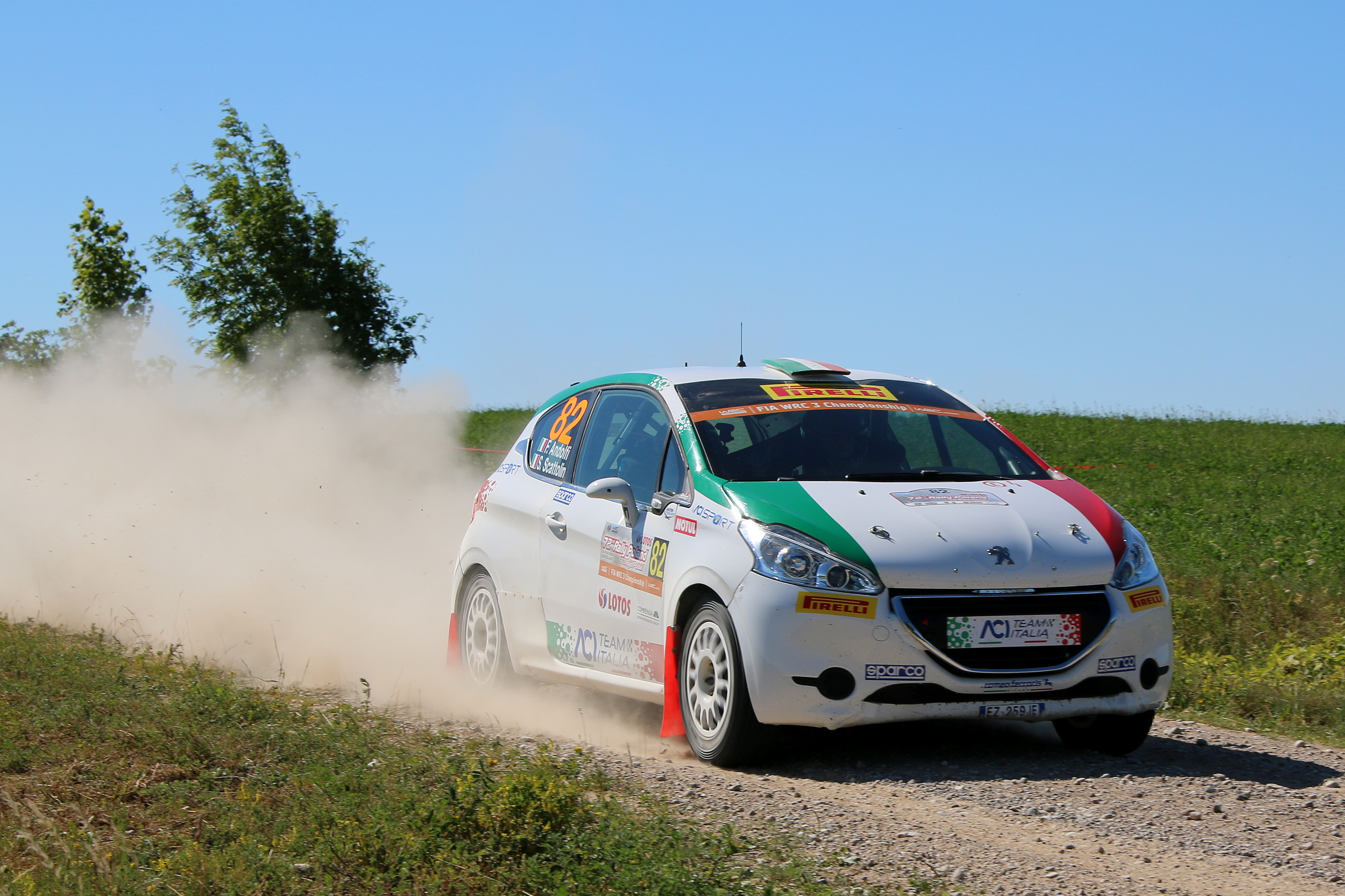
Peugeot 208 R2 driven by Fabio Andolfi

Juha Salo won the Finnish Rally Championship in 2015 and 2016 with the first generation-based R5.

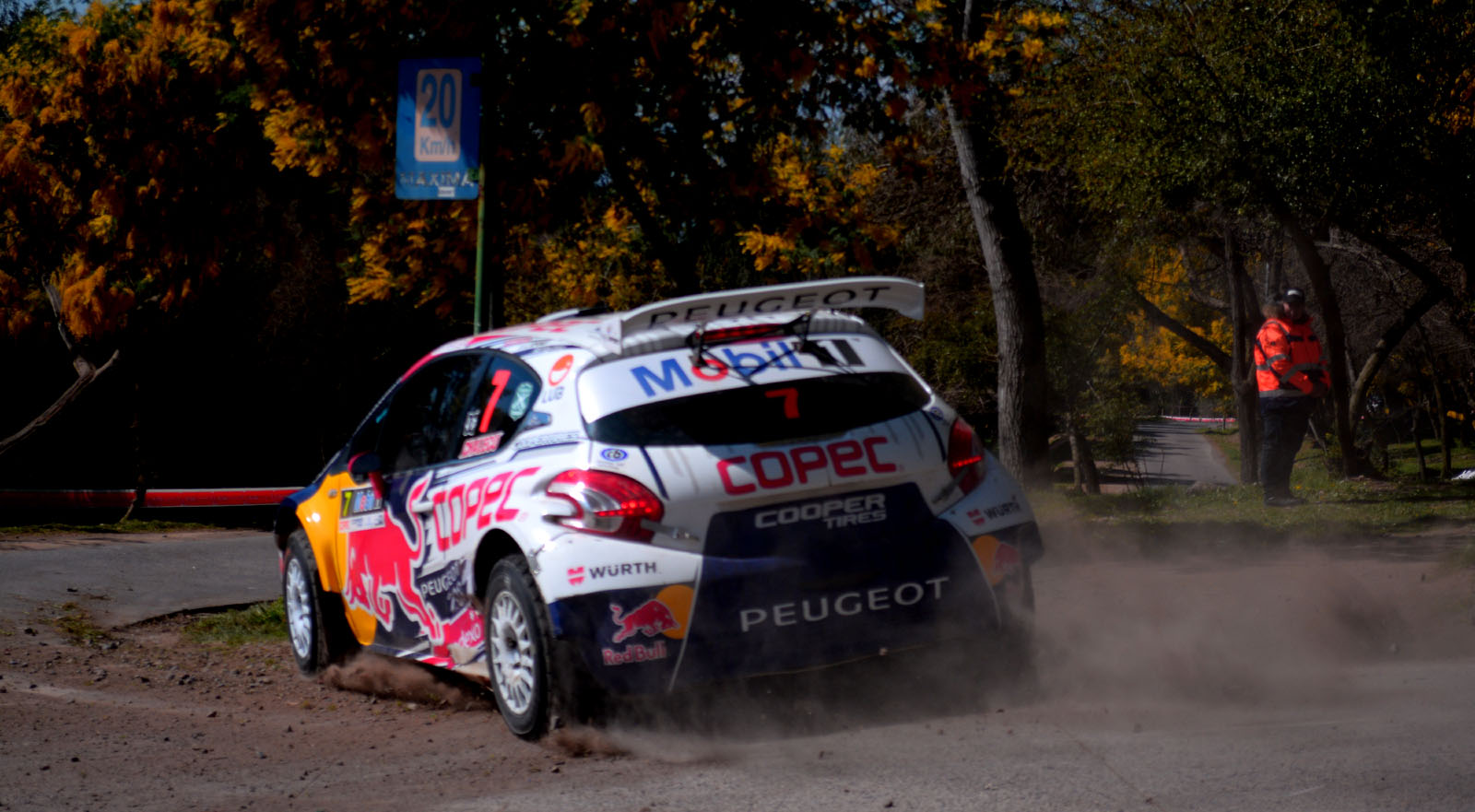
Peugeot 208 T16 R5

R2 (first generation) and Rally4 (second generation) variants are known due to Volant Peugeot and Peugeot Rally Cup Ibérica, among other two-wheel drive rally competitions.

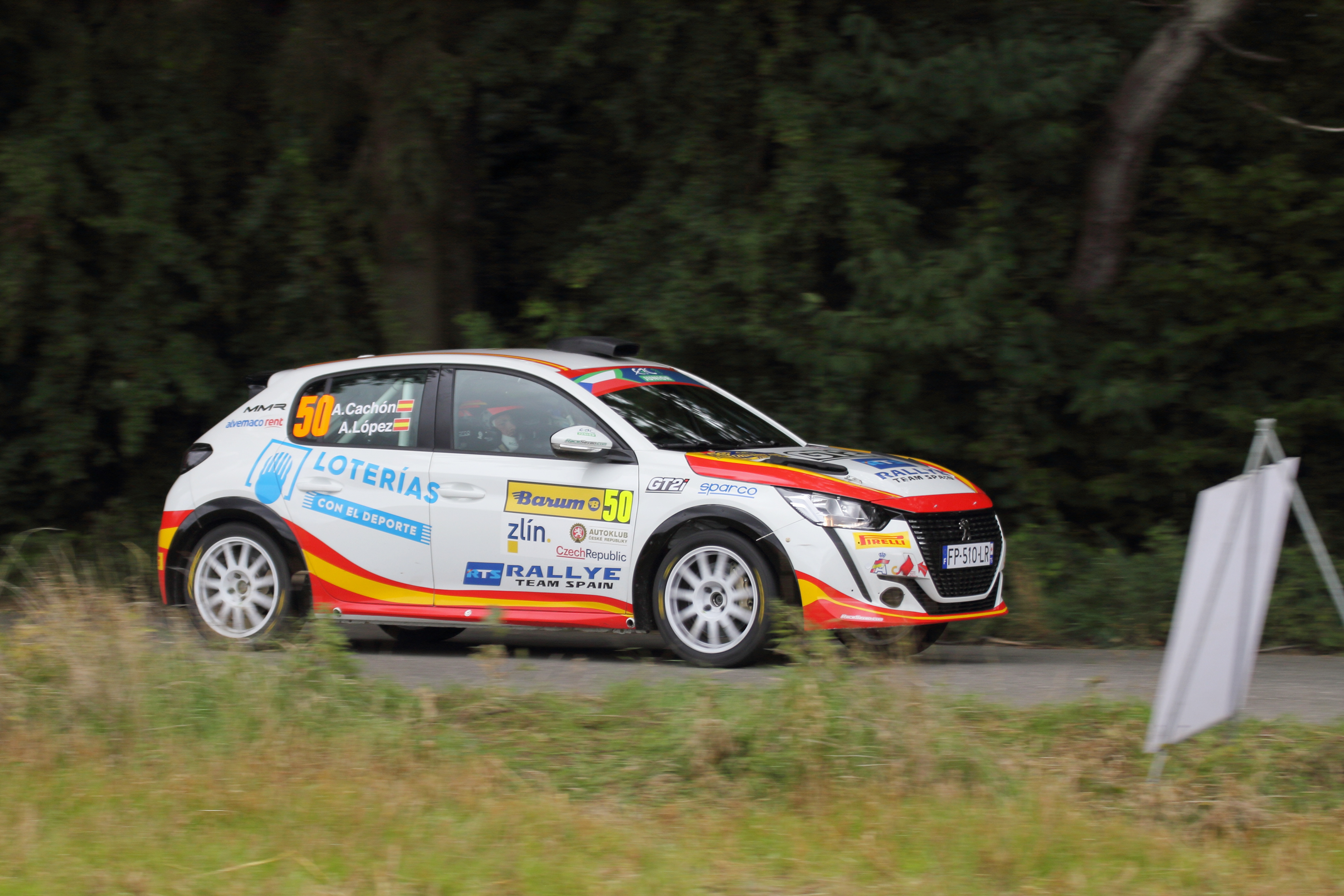
Peugeot 208 Rally4 driven by Alejandro Cachón

== Awards ==
208 receives the 'Best Cars' award for the best city car by a jury of readers from the magazine l'Automobile.

On January 26, 2016, thirteen journalists from the magazine Kilomètres Entreprise awarded its Blue HDi 100 version the "Business Cars of the Year" trophy in the "Versatile Business 2016" category.

== Notes and references ==
Awards
Preceded by Citroën DS3 WRC	Autosport Awards; Rally Car of the Year; 2013	Succeeded by Volkswagen Polo R WRC
