= Peugeot EX1 Concept =

Peugeot EX1
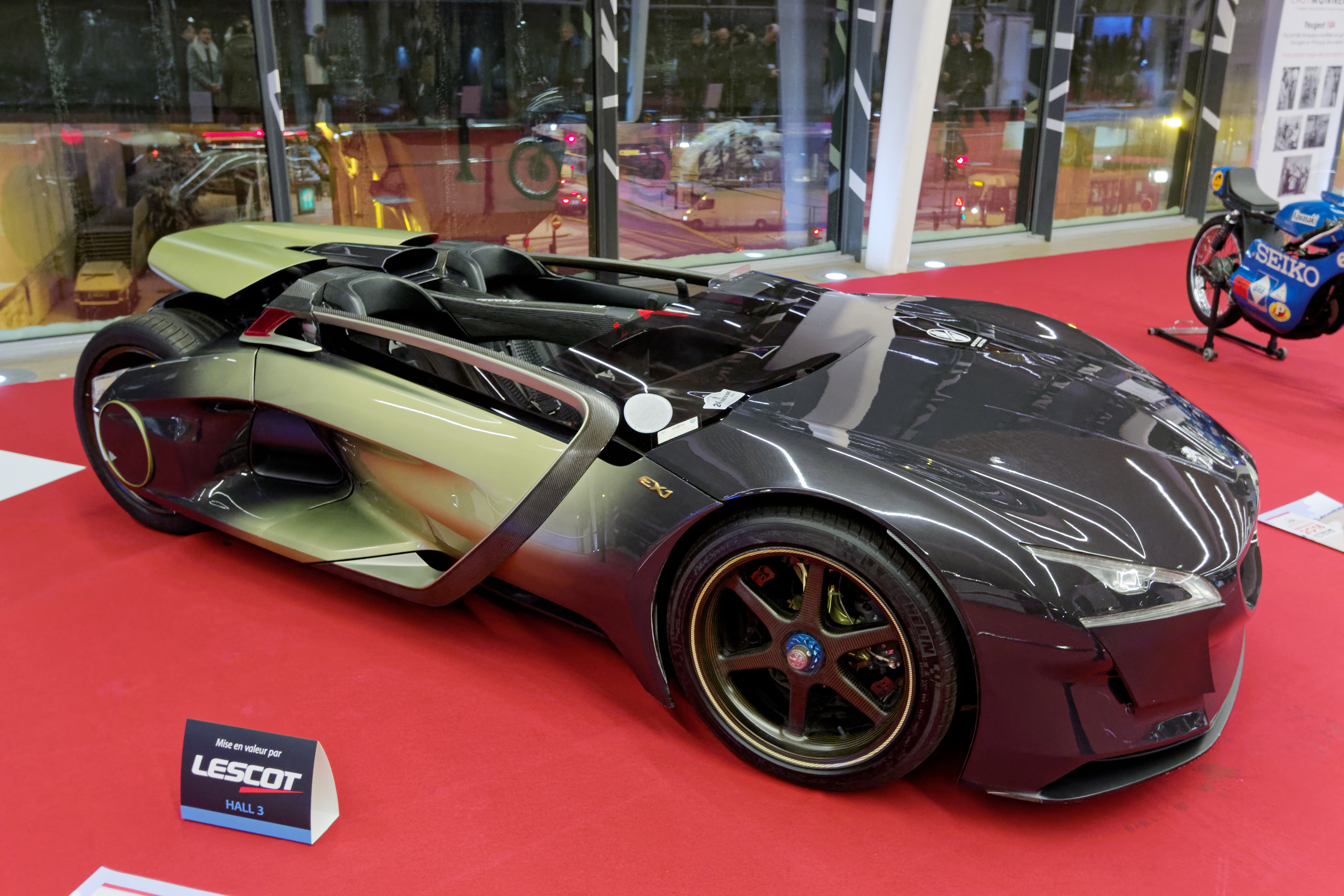

Overview
- Manufacturer: Peugeot
- Production: 2010 (Concept car)
- Designer: Pierre Authier

Body and chassis
- Class: Concept Sports car(S)
- Body style: 2-door roadster
- Layout: Dual-motors four-wheel drive
- Doors: Reverse-hinged with integrated seats

Powertrain
- Engine: 2x Electric motors
- Transmission: Single-speed

The Peugeot EX1 Concept is an electric concept car developed by the French automaker Peugeot, introduced at the 2010 Paris Motor Show.

== Design ==
Developed as part of Peugeot’s 200th anniversary celebrations, the EX1 Concept is a 2-door roadster with two electric motors that provide 250 kW (335 hp) and 480 N⋅m (354 lbf⋅ft) of torque. The monocoque body structure is manufactured from a carbon/honeycomb composite to optimize weight and rigidity, with a smaller rear track than the front. The car is 0.90 meters (3.0 feet) high and 1.77 meters (5.8 feet) wide.

== Performance ==
The EX1 broke six speed records for an electric vehicle weighing less than 1,000 kg (2,200 lb). From a standing start, the EX1 recorded the following times: 1/8 mile (8.89s), 1/4 mile (14.4s), 500m (16.81s), 1/2 mile (23.85s), 1000m (28.16s), and 1 mile (41.09s). It recorded a 0–60 mph (0–97 km/h) run of 2.24 seconds and an overall top speed of 161 mph (259 km/h).

At the Taipingsi military airport in Chengdu, China, the EX1 improved upon several of those records, recording 7.08 seconds for the 1/8 mile, 12.67 seconds for the 1/4 mile, and 0–100 km/h (0–62 mph) in 2.24 seconds.
