= Pierre Authier =

French car designer

Pierre Authier is a French car designer known for the Peugeot 208 and the urban cross-over Peugeot 2008. He was given the Rising Star Designer award by Automotive News in 2014.

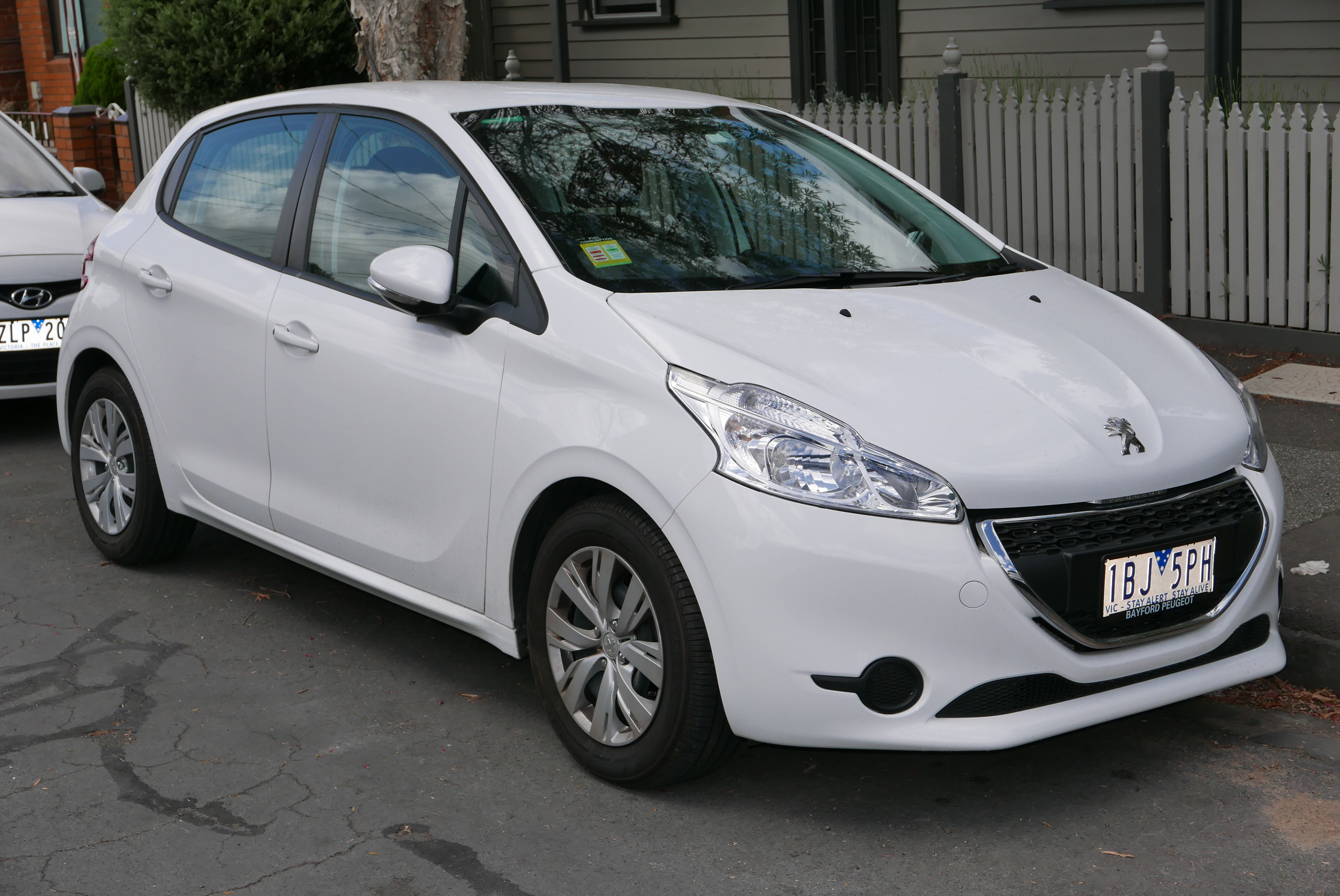
Peugeot 208

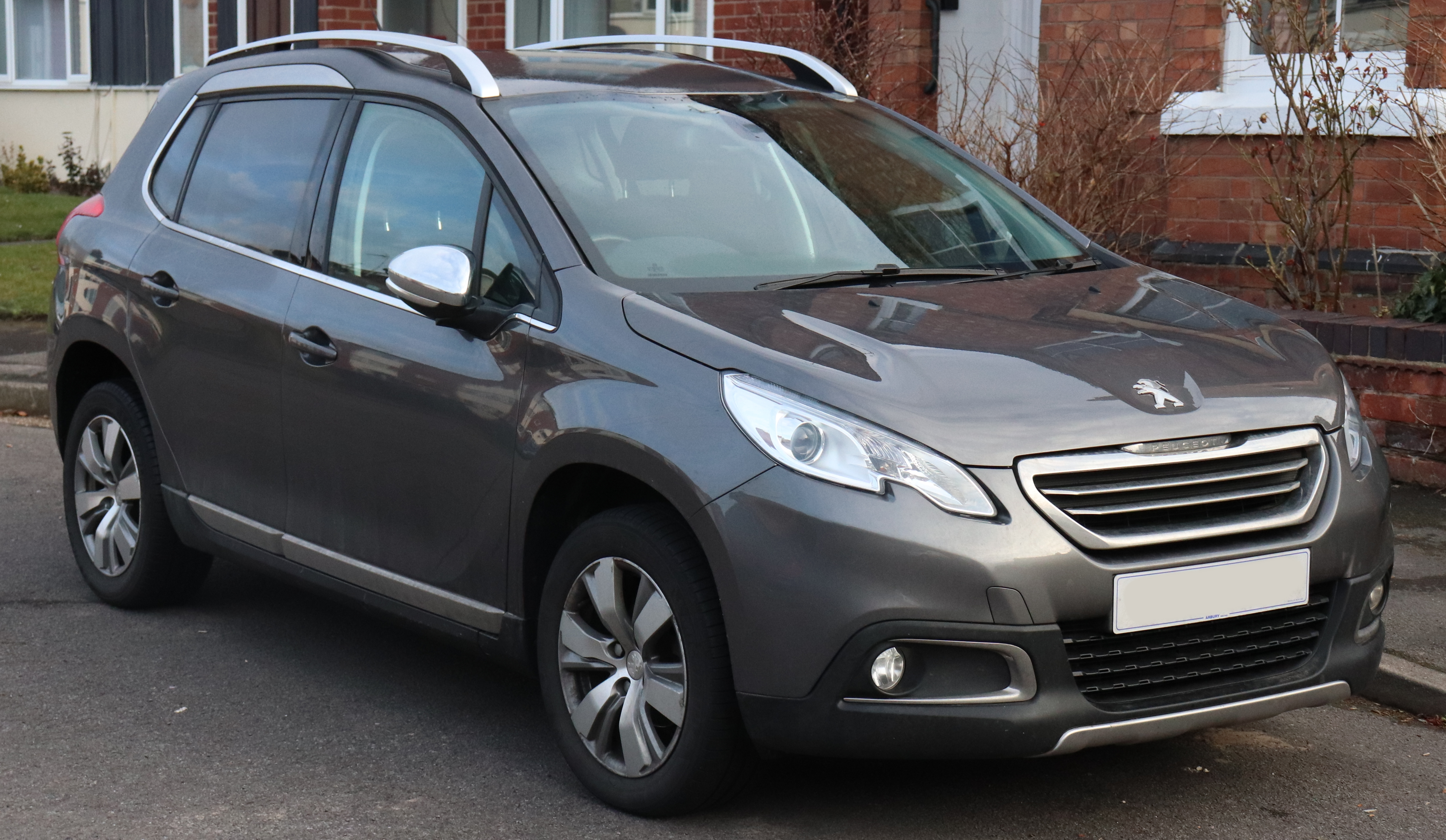
Peugeot 2008

After studying at the Art Center College of Design in Vevey in Switzerland, he joined Peugeot in 1997.

He was the head of design for the Peugeot 208 presented in 2011, and which was seen by some commentators as a landmark in Peugeot design.

He designed the Peugeot 208 XY and 208 GTi, which were both unveiled at the Geneva Motor Show in March 2012. He was the design manager for the 307, 308, 508 and EX1 Concept.

== Biography ==
A graduate of the Arts et Métiers ParisTech, Pierre Authier went on to attend the Art Center College of Design in Vevey, Switzerland, before joining Peugeot in 1997, recruited by Gérard Welter. Initially an exterior Designer, in 1999 he became assistant design manager on the 307. He then became chief designer on the 2007 308, before signing the 208, which inaugurates the “e-cockpit” interior, and notably the sporty GTi, which harks back to the myth of the 205 GTi. He is also responsible for the 2008 urban SUV[2], as well as the EX1 Concept car in 2010. In 2012, he was appointed Design Director for Citroën. His responsibilities include the design of the e-Méhari. Il est notamment chargé du design de la Citroën e-Méhari, followed by the C3 Aircross urban SUV.

In 2014, the European branch of Automotive News magazine awarded him its “Rising Star” prize, recognizing the best designer of the year.
