= Mārtiņš Sesks =

Latvian rally driver (born 1999)

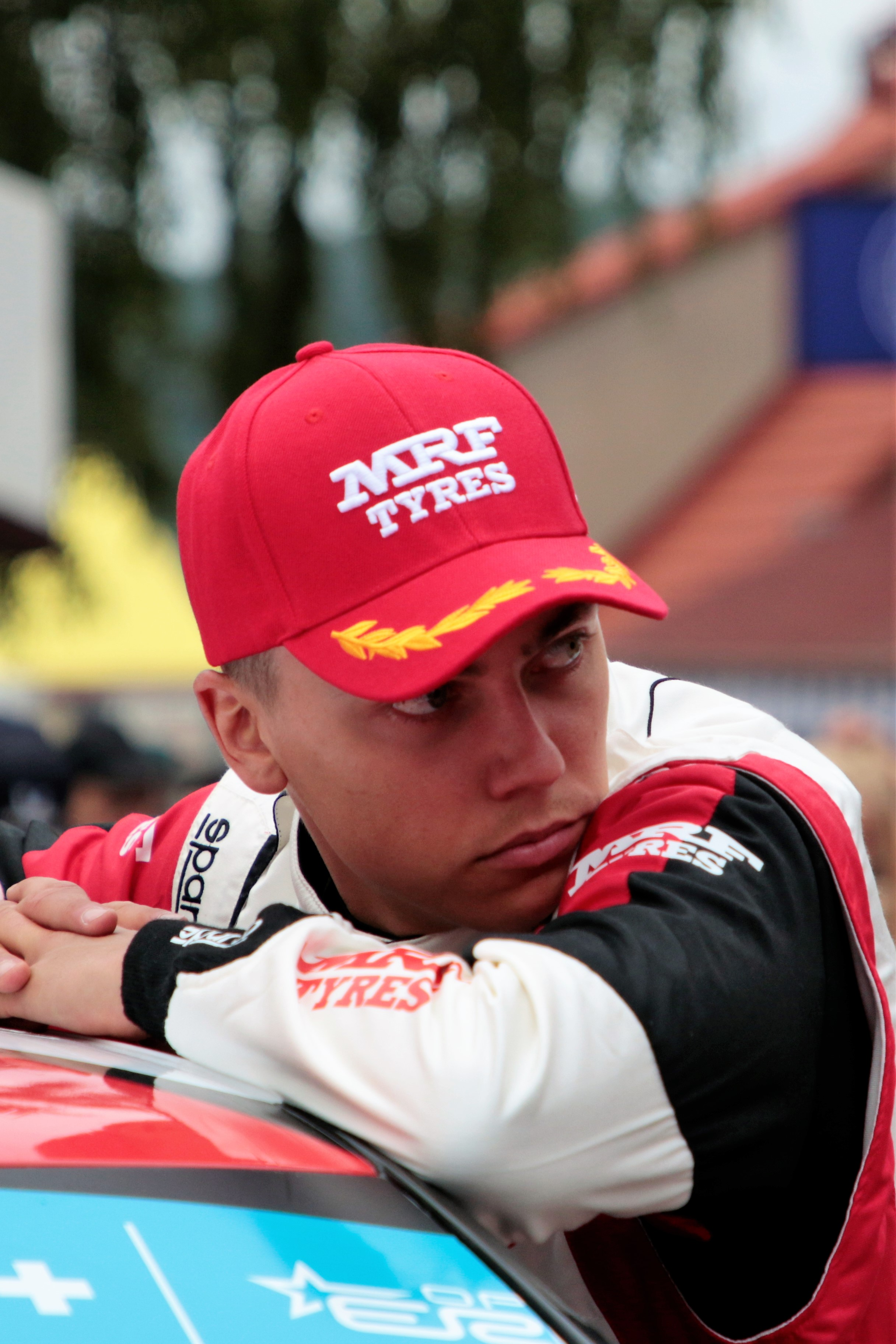
- Sesks at the 2022 Rally Poland

Personal information
- Nationality: (Latvia) Latvian
- Full name: Mārtiņš Nikijs Sesks
- Born: 18 September 1999 (age 27); Liepāja, Latvia

World Rally Championship record
- Years active: 2018–2021, 2024–present
- Co-driver: Renārs Francis
- Teams: M-Sport Ford WRT
- Rallies: 24
- Championships: 0
- Rally wins: 0
- Podiums: 0
- Stage wins: 7
- Total points: 38
- First rally: 2018 Rally Deutschland
- Last rally: 2025 Rally Saudi Arabia

Mārtiņš Nikijs Sesks (born 18 September 1999) is a Latvian rally driver who currently competes in the World Rally Championship for M-Sport Ford WRT on a part-time schedule.

== Rally career ==
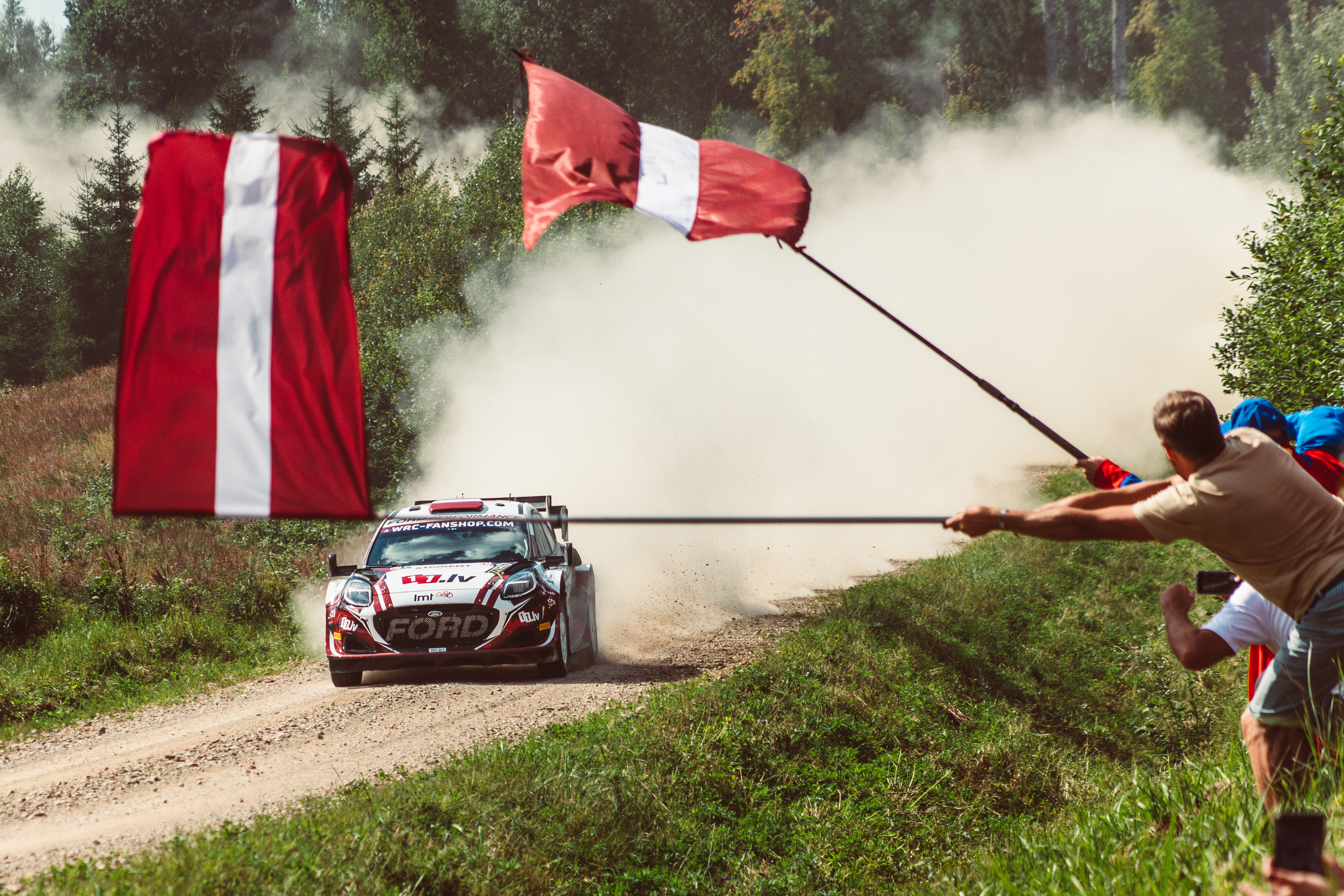
Mārtiņš Sesks at World Rally Championship 2024's Latvia SS13 Track at KM 4.3

Sesks started rallying in 2014 in a Honda Civic Type R. He entered the Junior World Rally Championship in 2019, and finished as runner-up in 2020. After winning his first European Rally Championship event in 2022, he entered the series full-time in 2023. He went on to finish second to Hayden Paddon in the final standing, having won the events in Poland and Latvia.

Sesks made his Rally1 debut in 2024, competing at the Rally Poland with M-Sport Ford WRT, where a strong opening run was praised by team principal Richard Millener. Despite running without a hybrid unit, he was able to run as high as second overall, eventually finishing fifth. He remained in the car for his home rally in Latvia, once again earning plaudits for his pace, with only a late technical problem preventing a podium finish. Later on, he would be confirmed for the rally in Chile. There however, Sesks was forced to retire from Friday's running after crashing into a bank and puncturing two tyres; he went on to finish 24th.

== Personal life ==
Sesks is the son of Uldis Sesks, a politician and former rally racer who served as the mayor of his hometown of Liepāja between 1997 and 2018.

== Rally results ==
=== Latvian Rally Championship results ===
Year	Entrant	Car	Class	1	2	3	4	5	6	7	8	Pos.	Points
2015	LMT Autosporta Akadēmija	Honda Civic Type-R EP3	LRC3	SAR; Ret	LIE; Ret	LIE; 6	TAL; Ret					6th	30
2015	LMT Autosporta Akadēmija	Ford Fiesta R2	LRC3					LAK; 3	KUR; 4	TAR; 6	LAT; Ret	6th	30
2016	LMT Autosporta Akadēmija	Ford Fiesta R2	LRC3	SAR; 4	KUR; 2							1st	112
2016	LMT Autosporta Akadēmija	Peugeot 208 R2	LRC3			TAL; 2	ŽEM; 1	TAL; 2	LIE; 2	LIE; 3	LAT; 1	1st	112
2017	LMT Autosporta Akadēmija	Peugeot 208 R2	LRC3	ALŪ; 1	SAR; Ret	TAL; Ret	LAT; 1	LÕU; 1	LIE; 2	LIE; 1		1st	172
2018	LMT Autosporta Akadēmija	Peugeot 208 R2	LRC3	ALŪ; 1	SAR; 1	TAL; 1	EST	LÕU				1st	94
2018	ADAC Opel Rallye Junior Team	Opel Adam R2	LRC3						LIE; 1	LIE; 1		1st	94
2019	LMT Autosporta Akadēmija	Ford Fiesta R2T	Overall	ALŪ; 9	SAR; 6							4th	29
2019	LMT Autosporta Akadēmija	Škoda Fabia R5	Overall			LIE; 3	LIE; 2	EST	LÕU			4th	29
2020	LMT Autosporta Akadēmija	Ford Fiesta Rally4	Overall	ROK; 3	LIE; 3	LIE; Ret						5th	48
2022	Proracing Rally Team	Škoda Fabia Rally2-Kit	LCR3	SAR; 1		CĒS; Ret	LÕU	SAM				4th	35
2022	Team MRF Tyres	Škoda Fabia Rally2 evo	LCR2		LIE; 1							4th	35
2023	Team MRF Tyres	Škoda Fabia Rally2-Kit	LCR3	SAR; 1								6th	35
2023	Team MRF Tyres	Škoda Fabia RS Rally2	LCR2		ALŪ; 1	VEC	LIE	LIE	CĒS	HPR	UTE	3rd	35

=== WRC results ===
Year	Entrant	Car	1	2	3	4	5	6	7	8	9	10	11	12	13	14	Pos.	Points
2018	Mārtiņš Sesks	Opel Adam R2	MON	SWE	MEX	FRA	ARG	POR	ITA	FIN	GER; 36	TUR	GBR	ESP	AUS		NC	0
2019	LMT Autosporta Akadēmija	Ford Fiesta R2T19	MON	SWE; 36	MEX	FRA; Ret	ARG	CHL	POR	ITA; 25	FIN; 42	GER	TUR	GBR	ESP	AUS; C	NC	0
2020	LMT Autosporta Akadēmija	Ford Fiesta Rally4	MON	SWE; 27	MEX	EST; 28	TUR	ITA; 34	MNZ; Ret								NC	0
2021	LMT Autosporta Akadēmija	Ford Fiesta Rally4	MON	ARC	CRO; 19	POR; 25	ITA	KEN	EST; 23	BEL; 58	GRE	FIN	ESP; 48	MNZ			NC	0
2024	M-Sport Ford WRT	Ford Puma Rally1	MON	SWE	KEN	CRO	POR	ITA	POL; 5	LAT; 7	FIN	GRE	CHL; 24	EUR	JPN		15th	22
2025	M-Sport Ford WRT	Ford Puma Rally1	MON	SWE; 6	KEN	ESP	POR; 15	ITA; Ret	GRE; 15	EST; 8	FIN; 8	PAR	CHL	EUR	JPN	SAU; Ret	12th	16
2026	M-Sport Ford WRT	Ford Puma Rally1	MON	SWE; 35	KEN	CRO	ESP	POR; 9	JPN	GRE; 8	EST; 7	FIN; 42	PAR	CHL	ITA; 18	SAU; C	16th	12

* Season still in progress.

=== ERC results ===
Year	Entrant	Car	1	2	3	4	5	6	7	8	9	10	Pos.	Points
2016	LMT Autosporta Akadēmija	Peugeot 208 R2	CAN	GBR	GRC	AZO	BEL	EST	POL	CZE	LAT; 17	CYP	NC	0
2017	LMT Autosporta Akadēmija	Peugeot 208 R2	AZO	CAN	GRC	CYP	POL	CZE	ITA	LAT; 11			NC	0
2018	ADAC Opel Rallye Junior Team	Opel Adam R2	AZO; 17	CAN; 19	GRC	CYP	ITA; 15	CZE; 15	POL	LAT; 10			44th	1
2019	LMT Autosporta Akadēmija	Škoda Fabia R5	AZO	CAN	LAT; 3	POL	ITA; 8	CZE	CYP	HUN			15th	29
2020	Mārtiņš Sesks	Ford Fiesta Rally4	ITA	LAT; Ret	PRT	HUN	CAN						NC	0
2021	LMT Autosporta Akadēmija	Ford Fiesta Rally4	POL	LAT; EX	ITA	CZE	AZO	PRT	HUN	CAN			NC	0
2022	Proracing Rally Team	Škoda Fabia Rally2-Kit	PRT	AZO; 10	CAN	POL; 17							12th	42
2022	Team MRF Tyres	Škoda Fabia Rally2 evo					LAT; 1	ITA; 31	CZE	ESP			12th	42
2023	Team MRF Tyres	Škoda Fabia RS Rally2	PRT; 12	CAN; 8	POL; 1	LAT; 1	SWE; 3	ITA; Ret	CZE; 11	HUN; 3			2nd	134
2024	Team MRF Tyres	Toyota GR Yaris Rally2	HUN; Ret	CAN; 23	SWE; 6	EST; 14	ITA	CZE	GBR	POL			28th	17
2025	Team MRF Tyres	Škoda Fabia RS Rally2	ESP	HUN	SWE	POL; 1	ITA	CZE	GBR	CRO			10th	35
