= Alexey Lukyanuk =

Russian rally driver (born 1980)

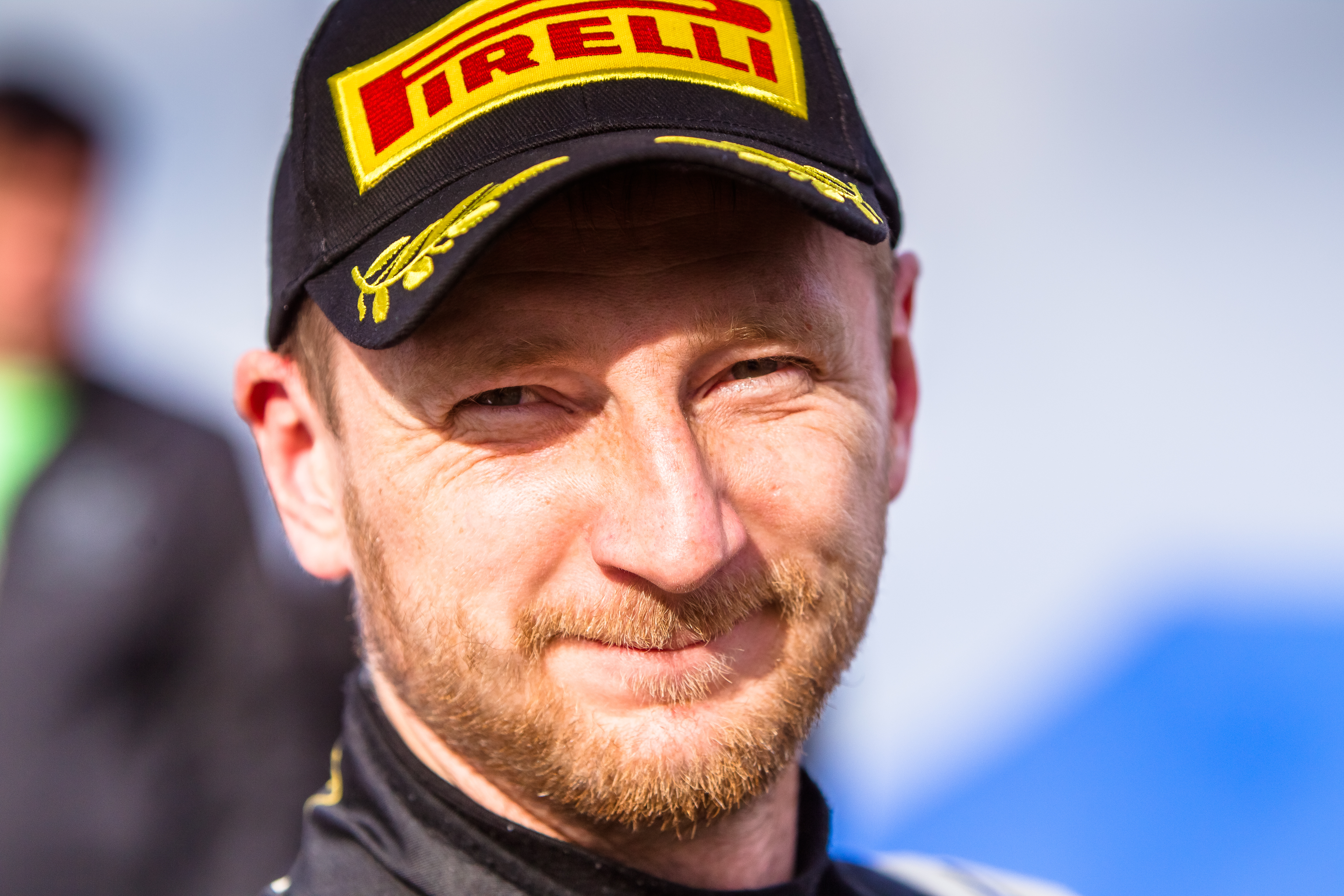
- Nationality: Russian
- Full name: Alexey Vasilyevich Lukyanuk
- Born: 12 December 1980 (age 45) Moscow, Russia

Championship titles
- 2014 2014 2018 2020: Estonian Rally Champion; Russian Rally Champion; European Rally Champion; European Rally Champion

Awards
- 2012 2014 2015: Colin McRae Flat Out Trophy; Colin McRae Flat Out Trophy; Colin McRae Flat Out Trophy - 3 times

World Rally Championship record
- Years active: 2013, 2015, 2017, 2021
- Rallies: 4
- Championships: 0
- Rally wins: 0
- Podiums: 0
- Stage wins: 0
- Total points: 4
- First rally: 2013 Rally Finland
- Last rally: 2021 Rally Estonia

Alexey Vasilyevich Lukyanuk (Russian: Алексей Васильевич Лукьянюк; born 12 December 1980) is a Russian rally driver based in Cyprus. He is a two-times European Rally Champion (2018) and (2020), and a three-times winner of Rally Islas Canarias.

Lukyanuk is the overall Champion of Russia and Estonia and the only holder of nine times Colin McRae Flat Out Trophy. In 2024, his co-driver was Yuriy Kulikov.

== Victories in Russia ==
- 2011 – the winner of Russia Rally Cup in 2000N category
- 2014 – Russian Rally Champion in N4 category
- 2014 – Overall Rally Champion of Russia

== Foreign sports career ==
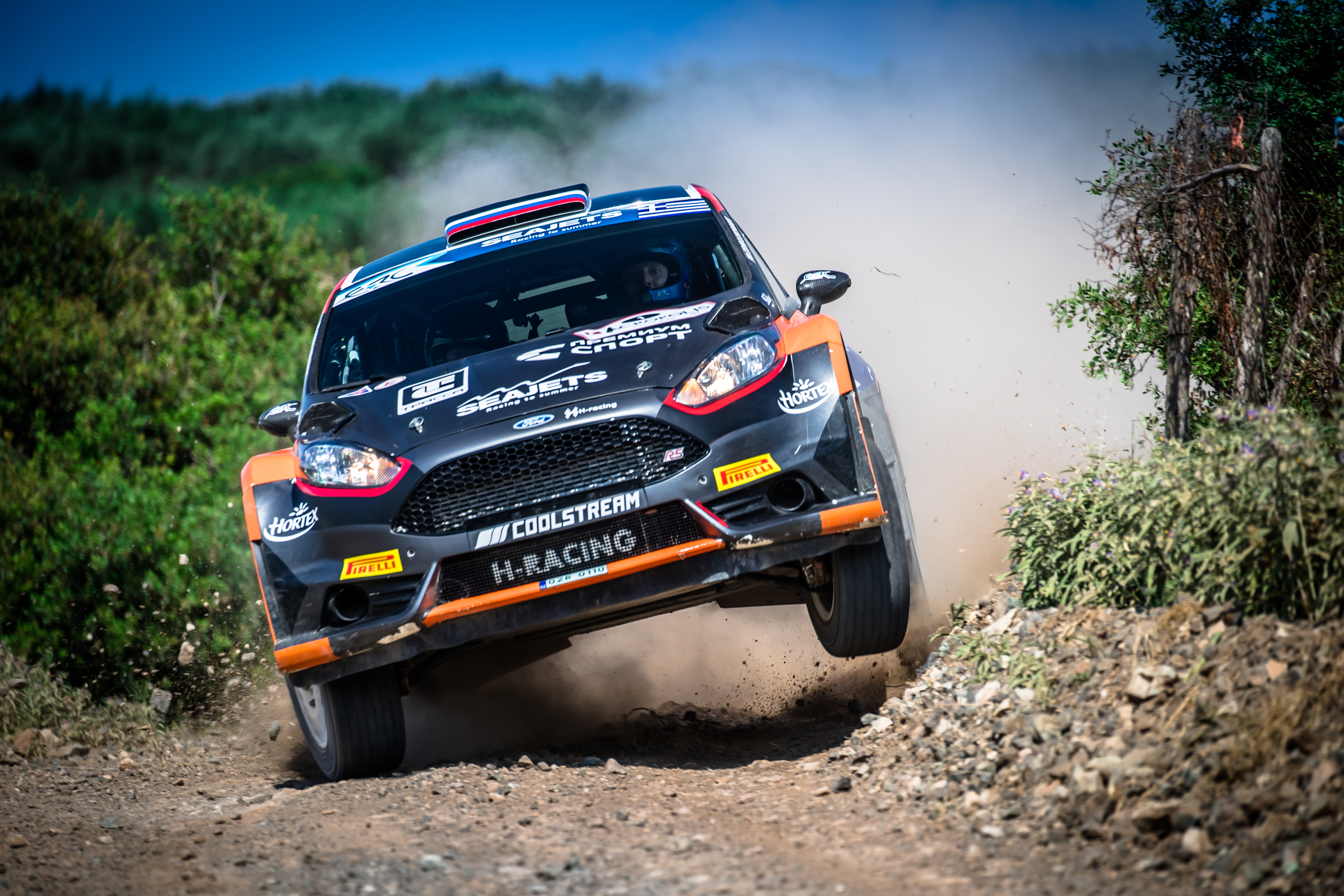
Rally Acropolis in Greece – European Rally Championship 2018

- 2011 – 5th place in Rally Saaremaa overall standings, the final round of Estonian Rally Championship and Baltics Cup
- 2012 – 1st place in Rally Saaremaa overall standings, the final round of Estonian Rally Championship and Baltics Cup (the first among Russians)
- 2013 – Colin McRae Flat Out Trophy at ERC round Liepaja-Ventspils in Latvia
- 2013 – 1st place in category 3 at WRC round in Finland
- 2014 – Colin McRae Flat Out Trophy at ERC round auto24 Rally Estonia
- 2014 – 2nd place in auto24 Rally Estonia overall standings, the ERC round
- 2014 – Estonian Rally Champion in N4 category
- 2014 – Overall Rally Champion of Estonia (the first among Russians)
- 2018 – FIA European Rally Champion
- 2020 – FIA European Rally Champion

== Results ==
=== European Rally Championship ===
Year	Car	1	2	3	4	5	6	7	8	9	10	ERC	Points
2015	Ford Fiesta R5	AUT; 3	LVA; Ret	IRL; 6	PRT	BEL		CZE; 4	CYP; 5	GRC; Ret	SUI; 1	3rd	157
2015	Mitsubishi Lancer Evo X						EST; 1					3rd	157
2016	Ford Fiesta R5	ESP; 1	GBR	GRC; 10	PRT; 2	BEL; Ret	EST; Ret	POL	CZE; 15	LVA; 2	CYP; 1	2nd	159
2017	Ford Fiesta R5	PRT; Ret	ESP; 1	GRC	CYP	POL; Ret	CZE; 2	ITA; Ret	LVA; Ret			4th	73
2018	Ford Fiesta R5	PRT; 1	ESP; 1	GRC; 19	CYP; Ret	ITA; 1	CZE; 2	POL; Ret	LVA			1st	150
2019	Citroën C3 R5	PRT; Ret	ESP; Ret	LAT; 2	POL; 1	ITA; 4	CZE; 15	CYP; Ret	HUN; 2			2nd	132
2020	Citroën C3 R5	ITA; 1	LAT; 2	PRT; 1	HUN; 13	ESP; 7						1st	121
2021	Citroën C3 R5	POL; 1	LAT; 3	ITA; Ret	CZE; WD	PRT1; Ret	PRT2; 2	HUN	ESP; 1			4th	135
2023	Škoda Fabia RS Rally2	PRT	CAN	POL	LAT	SWE	ITA; 30	CZE; Ret	HUN			NC	0
2024	Hyundai i20 N Rally2	HUN; 6	CAN; 14	SWE	EST	ITA	CZE	GBR	POL			62nd	2

== Career ==
Born in Moscow, Lukyanuk started rallying in 2005. His first car was Zhiguli VAZ 2105 at Club Rally round in Staraya Shuya Rally (Ралли «Старая Шуя»). Then he started occasionally 2–3 times a year. He finished sometimes but more often Lukyanuk retired by technical reasons although his rivals could not ignore his pace. The great powerful car Opel Astra GSI came a little bit later but unfortunately it had troubles with reliability.

In 2009, Lukyanuk met his co-driver Aleksey Arnautov. In December, the crew won Rally “Svetogorsk-2009”.

=== 2010 – the crew took part in Russia Cup at the wheel of Opel Astra GSI ===
- “Rally Yakkima” – Opel engine exploded at the very first special stage.
- “Rally Golubye Ozera” – the same story. The crew started in Zhiguli as the “zero” crew and entertained spectators at the wheel of rear drive car.
- “Rally Vyborg” – a small mistake in notes led to a dramatic hitting the trees. Fortunately the crew was not injured, and the car did not need a long repair.
- “Strugi Krasnye”
- “Saint Petersburg” – finish in Opel on the third place in overall standings! Many crews in four-wheel drive cars were not satisfied with their performance.

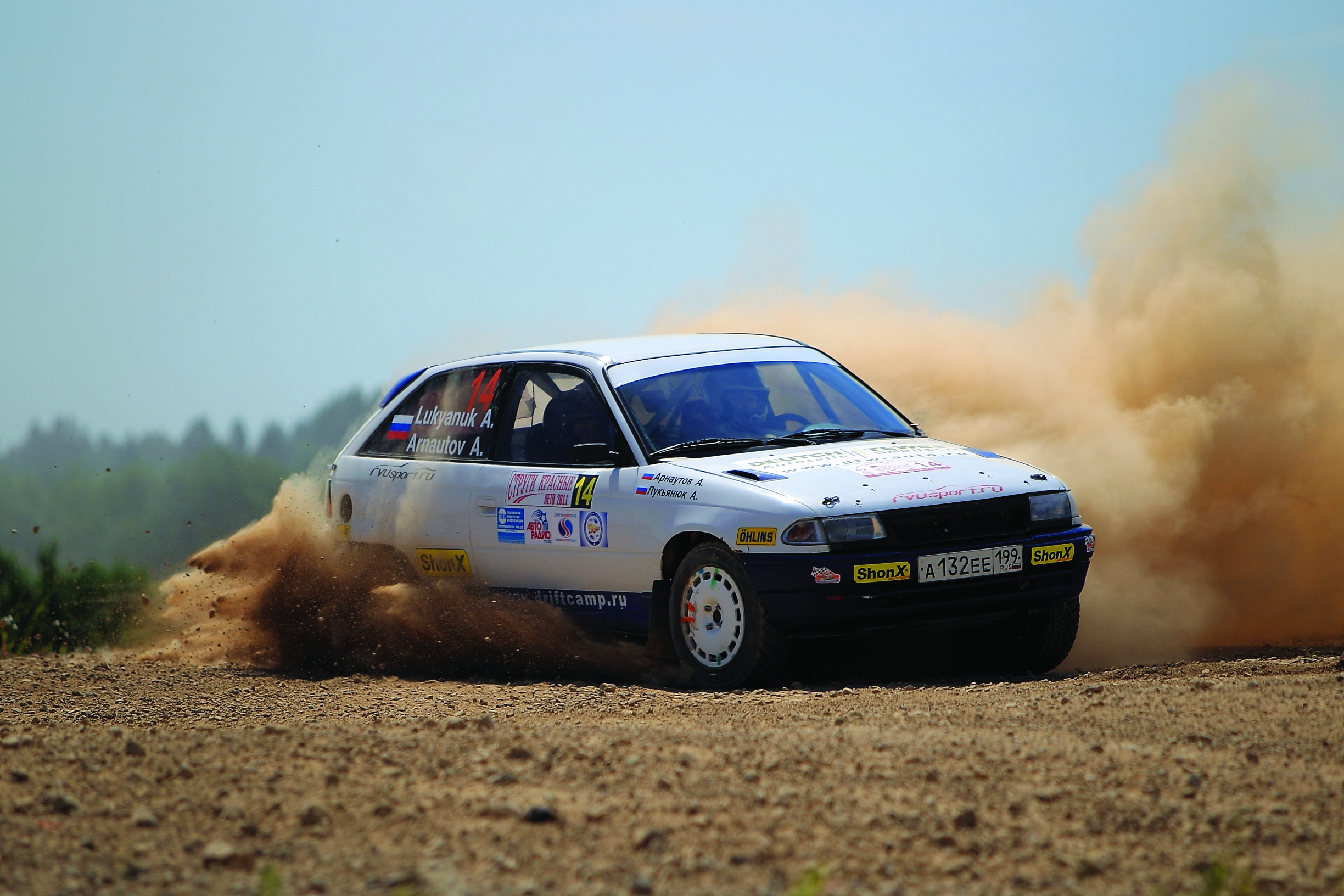
Alexey Lukyanuk and Aleksey Arnautov at rally Strugi Krasnye 2011 – Russian Rally Cup

=== 2011 – a new attempt to win Russia Cup ===
- “Rally Strugi Krasnye Winter” – 1st place in category
- “Rally Yakkima” – 1st place in category
- “Rally Golubye Ozera” – 1st place in category
- “Strugi Krasnye Summer” – retirement because of technical problems with drive gear
- “Rostov Veliky” – the race took place on the base of working open-cut mining. Even good Ohlins shock absorbers did not cope with a road that favoured only local Belaz so the crew had to retire.
- “Rally Vyborg” – the drive gear was broken again and the gas pump was worn. New retirement.
- “Saint Petersburg” – finish in Opel on the first place in category and the third place in overall standings! Many crews in four-wheel drive cars were not satisfied with their performance.
- “Pskov” – new engine failure. The crew retired again, but guys came to the final race fully armed with maximum possible 80 points. They only did not have time to prepare the car...
- “Tuapse”. It was a dramatic rally: the crew had 80 points and their closest rival Irek Dautov only 60. It was enough for victory just to finish, but the car let them down... The flywheel unscrewed on the road to technical check. Retirement? No, mechanics went to Krasnodar at night, found the spare parts and prepared the car to start, but substandard clutch crept, and it was decided to retire on the first day and to use a Superally because time penalty was not a problem. The mechanics repaired the car again and prepared it for the next day start. Heavy rains turned not the best mountain Tuapse roads into an awful mix of water and stones that really crushed rally cars. Irek also retired on the first day because of problems with gearbox, so the battle thickened on the second day. The crew drove slowly to save the car, but at a steep descent the gearbox broke in half because of the overload... Retirement. Irek finished the third. Lukyanuk and Arnautov won Russia Rally Cup in 2000N category!!!

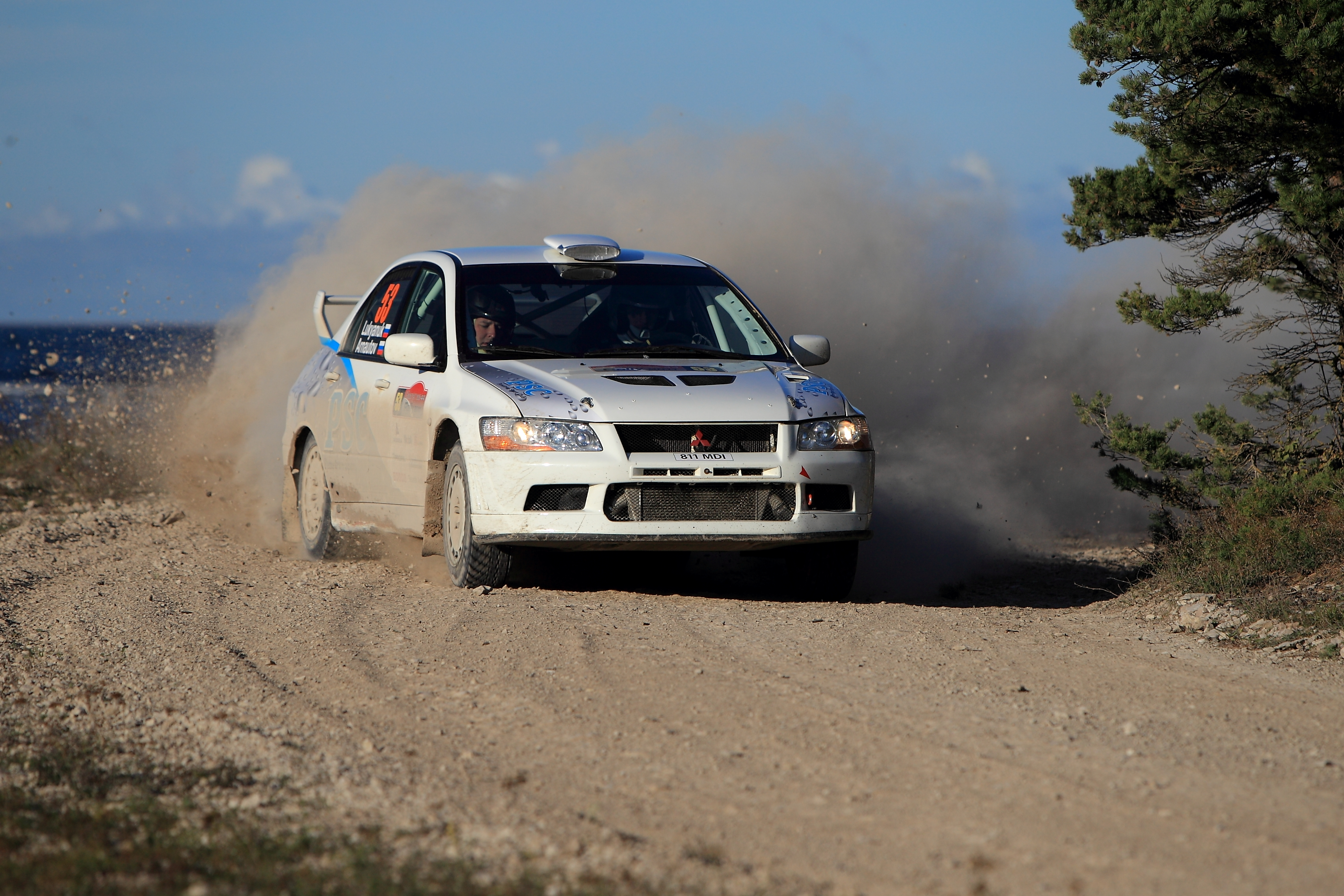
Alexey Lukyanuk and Aleksey Arnautov at Rally Saaremaa in 2011

Simultaneously with races in Russia the crew competed abroad, in nearby Estonia. This country is reach in rally traditions, it offers perfect roads, good race organisation and close competition in all categories. Crews that had performed well in Russia rarely achieved high results in Baltics. But Alexey Lukyanuk showed he deserved more:

- “Tallinn” – the crew did not reach the finish line, they retired because of troubles with gearbox. But in E10 category – 2-litre cars – the crew was among leaders.
- “Otepaa” – the first race of such a high level, almost the European Championship (in 2014 Rally Estonia got the status of ERC round). The crew showed good results and dramatic driving, but the broken drive gear quenched all hopes for successful finish.

The season final turned to be unexpected. Thanks to businessman Vadim Kuznetsov support Lukyanuk had the opportunity to participate in legendary rally “Saaremaa” in four-wheel drive Mitsubishi Lancer Evo 7, and he took the fifth place in overall standings.

=== 2012 – a season in Estonian Rally Championship ===
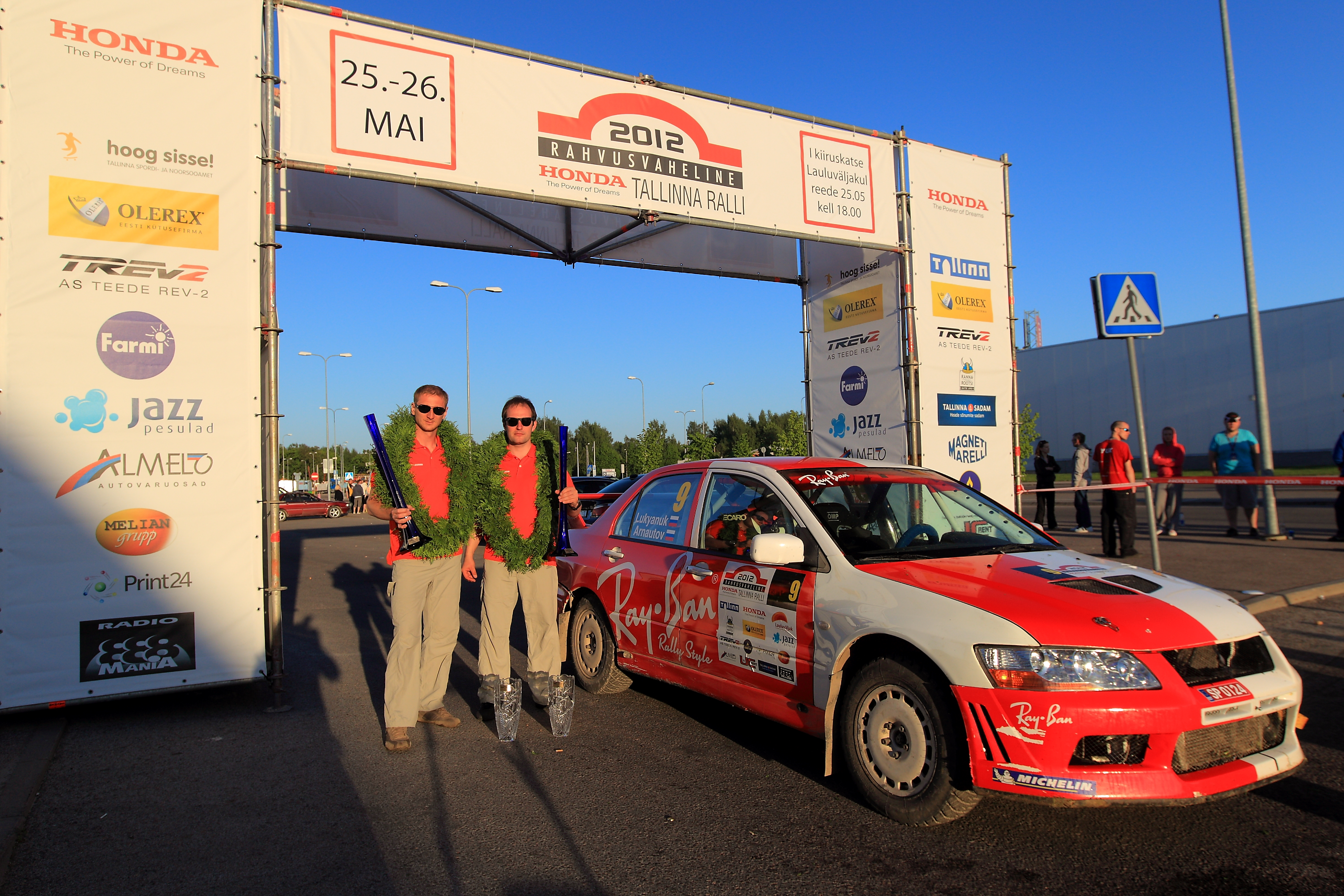
Alexey Lukyanuk and Aleksey Arnautov at Rally Tallinn finish

- Rally Virumaa – 1st place in category and 7th in overall standings.
- Rally Tallinn in 2012 was not in Estonian Championship calendar, but turned to be very successful for Lukyanuk and Arnautov — they secured the victory in overall standings
- Rally Madona – 1st place in category and 5th in overall standings
- Rally Estonia became the significant race for Alexey Lukyanuk. He started there for the first time in Lancer Evo 9 prepared by ASRT team. The crew was showing very good results during the whole rally and it claimed for the highest podium step in category. They were losing only 3.4 sec to category leader Estonian Kaspar Koitla, but then the rear drive broke and the crew had to finish two last special stages with three-wheel drive. Even in this difficult situation guys were able to secure the second place in category and the seventh in overall standings. Note that the top five places were occupied by WRC and S2000 category cars.
- Rally Viru was a bad luck in Lukyanuk performance. After the finish on the first place in overall standings the technical committee found some defect in car preparation (the absence of catalyst that is not necessary by international rules but is required in Estonia), and the crew result was cancelled. It crossed out not only that race but also the whole championship results because by the rules that rally was counted against overall standings and could not be dismissed.
- Rally Kurzeme. Lukyanuk got the opportunity to take part in legendary Latvian Rally Kurzeme. His partner there was Roman Kapustin — a co-driver of Vadim Kuznetsov, who has supporting Lukyanuk during the last years. But at the last section the clutch mechanism broke, and the crew had to retire.

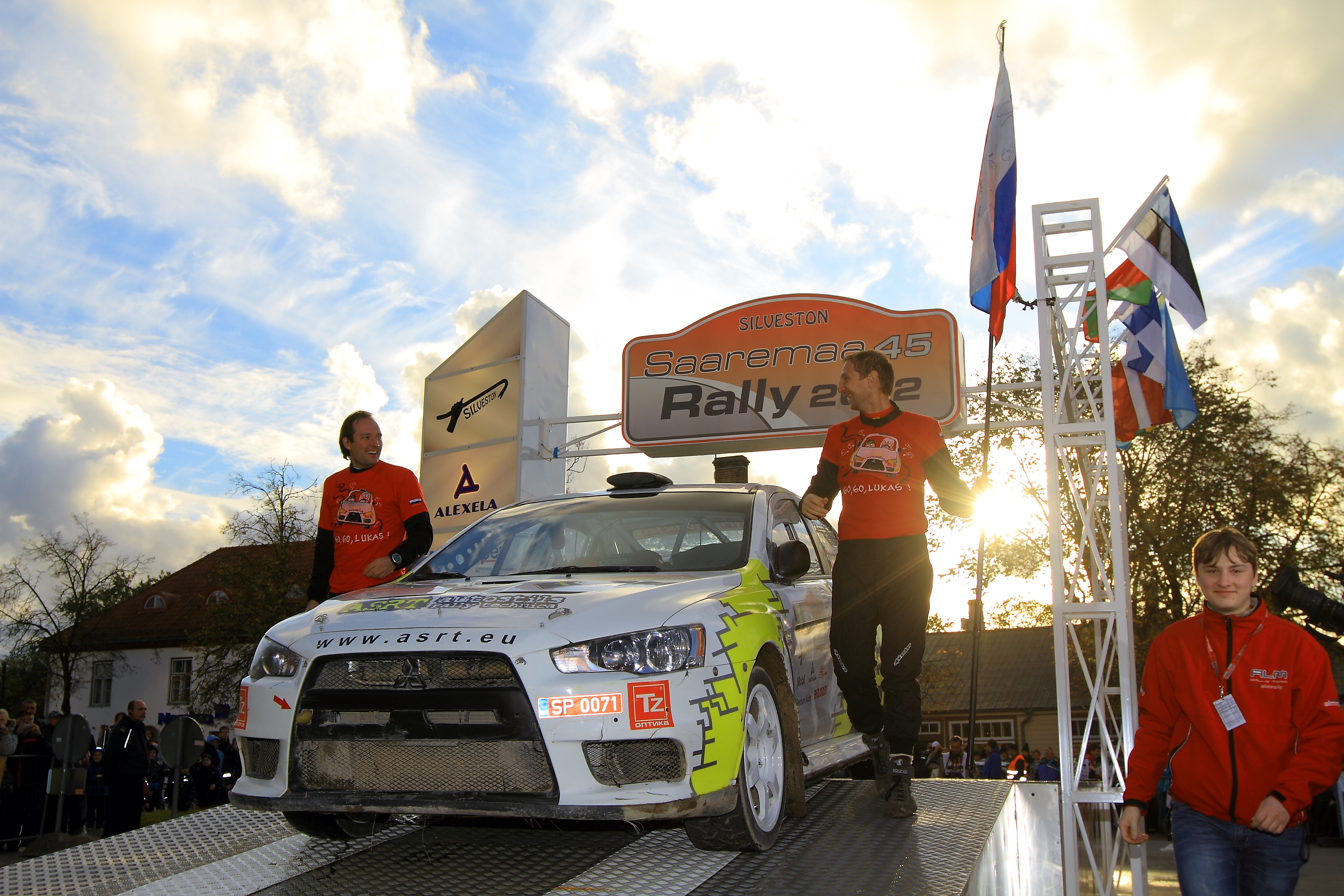
Alexey Lukyanuk and Aleksey Arnautov on Rally Saaremaa podium 2012

- Rally Mulgi. ASRT team prepared Lancer Evo 10 in R4 category. Started with the traditional co-driver Aleksey Arnautov, the crew set the good pace and led the race, but it slipped into a deep drain at one of the stages and could not get away for a long time. Only concerted efforts of spectators helped the guys to go back to the road. It was even bitterer because later that stage was cancelled. The car was not damaged, and the finish line was successfully crossed, but the result was only the first place in category and the 33rd in overall standings.
- Rally Saaremaa. This race was the season final chord. In 2011 the crew debuted there at four-wheel drive, and in 2012 they claimed for the high place in R4 category and overall standings. The close fight for the place in overall standings thickened at the last section with Karl Kruuda in S2000. Lukyanuk took a risk, pushed hard and won. For the first time in Rally Saaremaa history the Russian crew took the first place in overall standings.

=== 2013 – Estonian Rally Championship ===
Businessman Vadim Kuznetsov and ASRT team decided to place the entry for Alexey Lukyanuk for the whole year in Estonian and Latvian Championships at the wheel of Lancer Evo X in N4 category.

- Liepaja-Ventspils. This race received the status of ERC round and consisted of two Latvian Championship rounds because of its length. On the first two days the crew performed perfectly. They secured the first place in Latvian Championship round overall standings with a gap of 1.5 min from the closest rival! and the third place in ERC round overall standings by the day results. The next morning the fight for the third place in ERC continued, and the new round of Latvian Championship started. During the whole day Lukyanuk was successfully fighting with experienced Francois Delecour. That day there was only distant service instead of usual one, and mechanics possibilities were limited, so they could not repair damaged undercover. It was lost at SS-14, and the oil cooler was hit by some hillock. The crew had to retire. By the rally results Alexey Lukyanuk received Colin McRae Flat Out Trophy that is awarded only to drivers showing outstanding results and fighting for victory to the end.
- Rally Viru was unsuccessful. From the very beginning the crew led overall category standings, but at SS-5 the right rear wheel broke down at a very high speed and damaged differential pump. Guys were able to finish only on the 12th place in category.
- Rally Tallinn caught the crew fancy, but that year experienced Ott Tanak came back to the championship. Earlier he had performed for Ford works team in WRC so the struggle switched to another level. The very close fight was continuing for the whole day and it ended up for Tanak with 0.6 sec advantage. So the crew got the second place in category and the third in overall standings.
- Rally Talsi. The fight with Tanak continued. Despite the presence of WRC cars Lukyanuk won 4 stages from 12 and led the race after SS-6. Unfortunately bad jump at last special stage led only to 12th place in overall standings and 5th in category.
- Rally Viru. There was a tough fight during the whole race. The stress level was very high. A small mistake in one of the corners led to hitting the trees. Retirement. The crew was not injured, but the car was totally damaged.
- Rally Estonia. The crew did not have time to build a new car after the accident in Viru so they rented ex- Siim Plangi's car Lancer Evo 9. Despite the recent accident Lukyanuk set the impressive pace in unfamiliar car. As a result, he drove to the third podium step just after WRC and S2000 cars. The crew rose to the first place in Latvian Championship and the second place in Estonian Championship.

==== World Rally Championship, Finland, Neste Oil Rally ====
In 2013, Alexey Lukyanuk competed in a WRC round, which features fast roads and frequent jumps. The crew adapted to the conditions and recorded the eighth-fastest time overall during the spectators’ special stage. By the end of the second day, Lukyanuk was in 12th position, with a ten-minute lead over the nearest competitor in his category. A puncture at the Ouninpohja special stage resulted in a drop to 16th overall, though the crew retained first place in Class 3.

=== 2014 – Estonian Rally Championship and Russian Rally Championship ===
==== Russian Championship ====
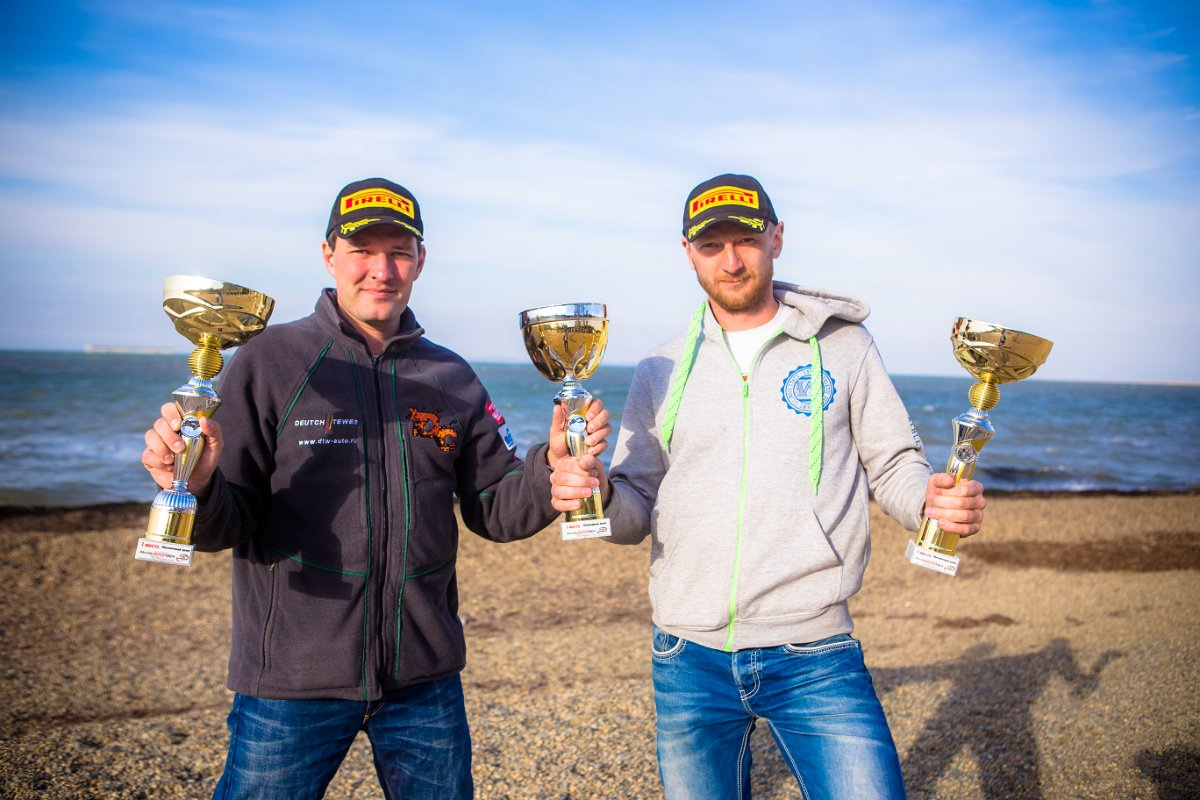
Rally Kuban finish – the final round of Russian Rally Championship 2014

- Rally Gorny Len. The crew earned a four-minute penalty because of co-driver's mistake, so they could not claim for the first place. Second place in category and third place in overall standings.
- Rally Peno. The crew went off the road at spectators special stage and retired.
- Rally Karelia. Long expected win – first place in overall standings.
- White Nights Rally. Fast Karelian roads resigned to the crew from Saint Petersburg – first place in overall standings.
- South Urals Rally. The crew started the race well and won the first section with a good advantage despite the rainy weather. But the damaged brake pipe forced guys to throttle down. 40 km/h by twist mountain road without brakes dropped the crew back. Despite the absence of brakes Lukyanuk showed very good results. Second place in category and third place in overall standings.
- Rally Predgorya Kavkaza. Good and fast race. Despite the retirement of main competitors Lukyanuk continued to please his fans with rapid and aggressive driving.
- Rally Kuban. The final cord in Russian Rally Championship 2014. The crew from Saint Petersburg received the title of Russia Champions after the splendid victory!

==== Estonian Championship ====
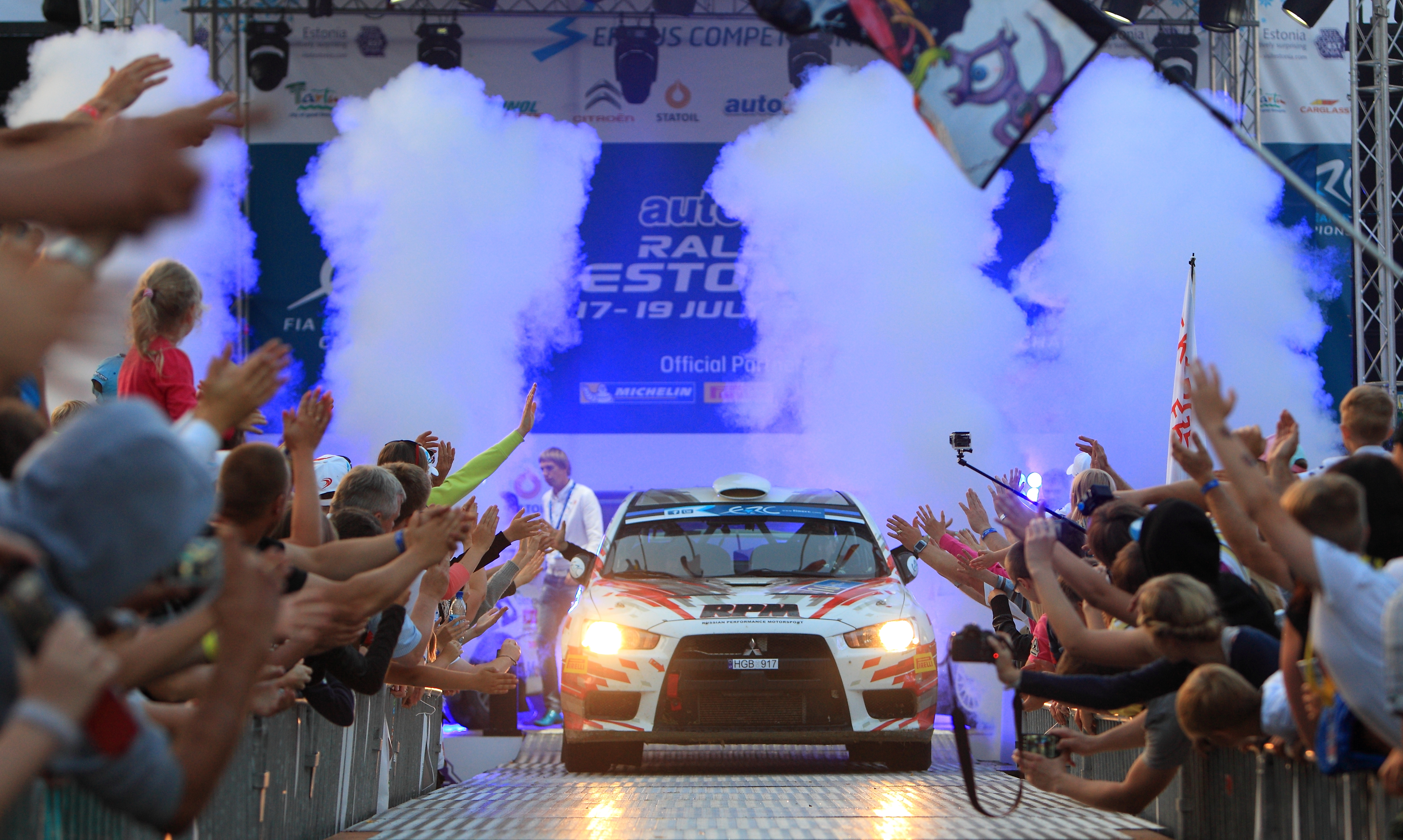
Lukyanuk leaving the podium of Rally Estonia – European Rally Championship round

- Rally Vorumaa. The crew had to miss that round because it intersected with Rally Peno — Russian championship round.
- Rally Harju. A new race in the vicinity of Tallinn got the first overall winner. In 2014 it was Alexey Lukyanuk from Russia. His rivals in more powerful cars could not catch him.
- Rally Viru. A tough fight with Timu Kyrge during the whole race ended up with Estonian victory in a higher class car. Lukyanuk secured the victory in N4 category with a huge gap from his rivals.
- Rally Estonia. In 2014 this race was held as European Championship round so the crew decided to participate in it. Some of the last stages were also included to Estonian Championship round route. Lukyanuk's pace forced rivals and fans to discuss only Russian crew. It was a convincing victory in category and the second place by ERC round results. Besides Lukyanuk was awarded Colin McRae ERC Flat Out Trophy for the second time.
- Rally Kurzeme. Lukyanuk performed confidently and secured the victory in overall standings. Unfortunately his main rival Timu Kyrge missed that round.
- Rally Tartu. Another one convincing victory in overall standings! And advanced title of Estonian Champions in N4 category!
- Rally Saaremaa is the iconic race for Baltic drivers. The entry list included 147 crews from Baltics, Finland, Russia and other countries. At this round Lukyanuk could receive overall Champion title in addition to N4. So he had to concentrate and not risk too much. Rain spoilt the surface, and it was slippery and dangerous somewhere. Lukyanuk was holding the high pace during the whole race and could fight for round victory to the finish, but after the turnover at SS-10 the crew lost ten seconds and the second place. 3rd place in overall standings and 2nd place in category. Alexey Lukyanuk also got the overall Estonian Champion title the first among Russians!

=== 2015 – European Rally Championship ===
result: 3rd, wins: 2, points: 157, stage wins: 32
