= 2016 European Rally Championship =

FIA motor rally race

Seasons
- ← 2015 2017 →

The 2016 European Rally Championship was the 64th season of the FIA European Rally Championship, the European continental championship series in rallying. The season was also the fourth following the merge between the European Rally Championship and the Intercontinental Rally Challenge.

== Calendar ==
The calendar for the 2016 season featured ten rallies.

Round	Dates	Rally name	Surface	
1	10–12 March	(Spain) Rally Islas Canarias	Tarmac	
2	7–9 April	(Northern Ireland) / (Republic of Ireland) Circuit of Ireland	Tarmac	ERC Junior Round 1
3	6–8 May	(Greece) Acropolis Rally	Gravel	
4	2–4 June	(Portugal) Rallye Açores	Gravel	ERC Junior Round 2
5	23–25 June	(Belgium) Ypres Rally	Tarmac	ERC Junior Round 3
6	15–17 July	Rally Estonia	Gravel	ERC Junior Round 4
7	4–6 August	(Poland) Rajd Rzeszowski	Tarmac	
8	26–28 August	(Czech Republic) Barum Rally Zlín	Tarmac	ERC Junior Round 5
9	16–19 September	(Latvia) Rally Liepāja–Ventspils^{1}	Gravel	ERC Junior Round 6
10	7–9 October	Cyprus Rally	Mixed	

Notes:

- ^1 – Season opener Rally Liepāja–Ventspils was cancelled due to warm temperatures and lack of snow. It was later moved to September and was held as gravel rally.

== Entry list ==
=== ERC ===
Notable entry list
Constructor	Car	Team	Driver	Co-driver	Rounds
Ford	Ford Fiesta R5	(Poland) Lotos Rally Team	(Poland) Kajetan Kajetanowicz	(Poland) Jarosław Baran	1–4, 6–9
Ford	Ford Fiesta R5	(Czech Republic) H – Racing Team	(Russia) Alexey Lukyanuk	(Russia) Alexey Arnautov	1–2, 4–6, 8, 10
Ford	Ford Fiesta R5	(Czech Republic) H – Racing Team	(Russia) Alexey Lukyanuk	(Russia) Roman Kapustin	3
Ford	Ford Fiesta R5	(Czech Republic) H – Racing Team	(Belgium) Cédric Cherain	(Belgium) André Leyh	5
Ford	Ford Fiesta R5	(Czech Republic) H – Racing Team	(Belgium) Cédric Cherain	(Belgium) Renaud Herman	8
Ford	Ford Fiesta R5	(Czech Republic) H – Racing Team	(Czech Republic) Ondřej Bisaha	(Czech Republic) Jiří Hovorka	8
Ford	Ford Fiesta R5	(Spain) RMC Motorsport	(Norway) Mads Østberg	(Norway) Ola Fløene	1
Ford	Ford Fiesta R5	(Spain) RMC Motorsport	(Spain) Jonathan Pérez	(Spain) Alejandro López	1
Ford	Ford Fiesta R5	(Spain) RMC Motorsport	(Spain) Juan Carlos Aguado	(Spain) Vanessa Valle	1
Ford	Ford Fiesta R5	(Spain) RMC Motorsport	(Portugal) Ricardo Teodósio	(Portugal) José Teixeira	4
Ford	Ford Fiesta R5	(Poland) C-Rally	(Poland) Jarosław Kołtun	(Poland) Ireneusz Pleskot	1–4, 6–7, 9
Ford	Ford Fiesta R5	(Poland) C-Rally	(Poland) Filip Nivette	(Poland) Kamil Heller	2
Ford	Ford Fiesta R5	(Poland) Tiger Energy Drink Rallye Team	(Poland) Tomasz Kasperczyk	(Poland) Damian Syty	1, 3–7, 9
Ford	Ford Fiesta R5	(Spain) Peña Autocross Arteixo	(Spain) Iván Ares	(Spain) Mario Tomé	1
Ford	Ford Fiesta R5	(United Kingdom) DMACK British Rally Team	(United Kingdom) Elfyn Evans	(United Kingdom) Craig Parry	2
Ford	Ford Fiesta R5	(United Kingdom) DMACK British Rally Team	(Finland) Max Vatanen	(France) Jacques-Julien Renucci	2
Ford	Ford Fiesta R5	(United Kingdom) DMACK British Rally Team	(Estonia) Ott Tänak	(Estonia) Raigo Mõlder	5
Ford	Ford Fiesta R5	(United Kingdom) Dom Buckley Motorsport	(United Kingdom) Alastair Fisher	(United Kingdom) Gordon Noble	2
Ford	Ford Fiesta R5	(United Kingdom) Dom Buckley Motorsport	(United Kingdom) Robert Woodside	(United Kingdom) Allan Harryman	2
Ford	Ford Fiesta R5	(United Kingdom) Dom Buckley Motorsport	(United Kingdom) Hugh Hunter	(United Kingdom) Andy Marchbank	2
Ford	Ford Fiesta R5	(United Kingdom) Spencer Sport	(United Kingdom) Tom Cave	(United Kingdom) James Morgan	2
Ford	Ford Fiesta R5	(United Kingdom) CA1 Sport Ltd	(Sweden) Fredrik Åhlin	(Norway) Morten Erik Abrahamsen	2
Ford	Ford Fiesta R5	(United Kingdom) CA1 Sport Ltd	(United Kingdom) Alex Laffey	(United Kingdom) Andrew Roughead	2
Ford	Ford Fiesta R5	(Republic of Ireland) Combilift Rallying	(Republic of Ireland) Josh Moffett	(Republic of Ireland) John Rowan	2
Ford	Ford Fiesta R5	(Republic of Ireland) Combilift Rallying	(Republic of Ireland) Sam Moffett	(Republic of Ireland) Karl Atkinson	2
Ford	Ford Fiesta R5	(Republic of Ireland) Wright Rallying	(Republic of Ireland) Stephen Wright	(Republic of Ireland) James Fulton	2
Ford	Ford Fiesta R5	(United Kingdom) Tiger Risk Rally Team	(United Kingdom) James Slaughter	(United Kingdom) James Whitaker	2
Ford	Ford Fiesta R5	(Czech Republic) Kimi Racing	(Czech Republic) Jaroslav Orsák	(Czech Republic) David Šmeidler	4–5
Ford	Ford Fiesta R5	(Norway) Adapta Motorsport	(Norway) Frank Tore Larsen	(Norway) Torstein Eriksen	4, 9
Ford	Ford Fiesta R5	(Portugal) P&B Racing	(Portugal) João Barros	(Portugal) Jorge Henriques	4
Ford	Ford Fiesta R5	(Portugal) P&B Racing	(Portugal) Elias Barros	(Portugal) Ricardo Faria	4
Ford	Ford Fiesta R5	(Portugal) ARC Sport	(Portugal) Ricardo Moura	(Portugal) António Costa	4
Ford	Ford Fiesta R5	(Portugal) ARC Sport	(Portugal) Joaquim Alves	(Portugal) Luís Ramalho	4
Ford	Ford Fiesta R5	(Portugal) Peres Competições	(Portugal) Fernando Peres	(Portugal) José Pedro Silva	4
Ford	Ford Fiesta R5	(Portugal) Team Além Mar	(Portugal) Luís Rego	(Portugal) Carlos Magalhães	4
Ford	Ford Fiesta R5	(Portugal) Sports & You	(Portugal) Diogo Salvi	(Portugal) Paulo Babo	4
Ford	Ford Fiesta R5	(Sweden) Sunnyside Experience	(Sweden) Lars Stugemo	(Sweden) Henrik Appelskog	4
Ford	Ford Fiesta R5	(Belgium) X-One Racing	(Belgium) Pieter Tsjoen	(Belgium) Eddy Chevaillier	5
Ford	Ford Fiesta R5	(Belgium) Autostal Duindistel VZW	(Belgium) Bernd Casier	(Belgium) Pieter Vyncke	5
Ford	Ford Fiesta R5	(Belgium) Autostal Duindistel VZW	(Belgium) Davy Vanneste	(Belgium) Eddy Snaet	5
Ford	Ford Fiesta R5	(Belgium) Autostal Duindistel VZW	(Belgium) Bruno Parmentier	(Belgium) Jeannick Breyne	5
Ford	Ford Fiesta R5	(Belgium) Renties Racing Team	(Belgium) Claudie Tanghe	(Belgium) Filip Cuvelier	5
Ford	Ford Fiesta R5	(Belgium) Renties Racing Team	(Belgium) Cédric Cherain	(Belgium) Filip Cuvelier	8
Ford	Ford Fiesta R5	(Estonia) SP Rally Project	(Estonia) Sander Pärn	(United Kingdom) James Morgan	6
Ford	Ford Fiesta R5	(Poland) Rally Technology	(Poland) Łukasz Habaj	(Poland) Piotr Woś	6, 8
Ford	Ford Fiesta R5	(Poland) Rally Technology	(Poland) Łukasz Habaj	(Poland) Jacek Spentany	7, 9
Ford	Ford Fiesta R5	(Finland) Tommi Mäkinen Racing	(Japan) Takamoto Katsuta	(United Kingdom) Daniel Barritt	6
Ford	Ford Fiesta R5	(Finland) Tommi Mäkinen Racing	(Japan) Hiroki Arai	(Australia) Glenn MacNeall	6
Ford	Ford Fiesta R5	(Slovakia) Rufa Sport	(Poland) Grzegorz Grzyb	(Poland) Robert Hundla	7
Ford	Ford Fiesta R5	(Poland) Go+Cars Atlas Ward	(Poland) Jakub Brzeziński	(Poland) Jakub Gerber	7
Ford	Ford Fiesta R5	(Czech Republic) TRT Czech Rally Sport	(Czech Republic) Roman Odložilík	(Czech Republic) Martin Tureček	8
Ford	Ford Fiesta R5	(Czech Republic) Svarmetal Motorsport	(Czech Republic) Martin Vlček	(Czech Republic) Jindřiška Žáková	8
Ford	Ford Fiesta R5	(Slovakia) L Racing s.r.o.	(Slovakia) Vlastimil Majerčák	(Slovakia) Michaela Vejačková	8
Ford	Ford Fiesta R5	Team Greece	(Greece) Lambros Athanassoulas	(Greece) Christos Kouzionis	10
Ford	Ford Fiesta R5	Culture & Sport Qatar Rally Team	(Qatar) Khalid Al-Suwaidi	(United Kingdom) Marshall Clarke	10
Ford	Ford Fiesta R5	(Germany) Toksport World Rally Team	(Cyprus) Mustafa Bulutoğlulari	(Cyprus) Ahmet Özerdem	10
Ford	Ford Fiesta S2000	(Ukraine) AT Rally Team	(Ukraine) Oleksiy Tamrazov	(Italy) Nicola Arena	8
Ford	Ford Fiesta S2000	(Turkey) Castrol Ford Team Türkiye	(Turkey) Rauf Denktaş	(Turkey) Bora Derviş	10
Citroën	Citroën DS3 R5	(Spain) Auto Laca Competición	(Spain) Luis Monzón	(Spain) José Carlos Déniz	1
Citroën	Citroën DS3 R5	(Hungary) Botka Rally Team	(Hungary) Dávid Botka	(Hungary) Péter Szeles	1–5, 7–10
Citroën	Citroën DS3 R5	(Italy) Delta Rally	(Switzerland) Federico Della Casa	(Italy) Domenico Pozzi	1–2
Citroën	Citroën DS3 R5	(Italy) Delta Rally	(France) Robert Consani	(France) Maxime Vilmot	2
Citroën	Citroën DS3 R5	(Italy) Delta Rally	(France) Robert Consani	(Belgium) Renaud Jamoul	3–4
Citroën	Citroën DS3 R5	(Italy) D-Max Racing	(Lebanon) Gilbert Bannout	(Belgium) Renaud Jamoul	1
Citroën	Citroën DS3 R5	(United Kingdom) DGM Sport	(Republic of Ireland) Craig Breen	(United Kingdom) Scott Martin	2
Citroën	Citroën DS3 R5	(United Kingdom) DGM Sport	(United Kingdom) Jonathan Greer	(United Kingdom) Kirsty Riddick	2
Citroën	Citroën DS3 R5	(Republic of Ireland) Ttec Rally Prep	(Republic of Ireland) Keith Cronin	(Republic of Ireland) Mikie Galvin	2
Citroën	Citroën DS3 R5	(Portugal) Citroën Vodafone Team	(Portugal) José Pedro Fontes	(Portugal) Inês Ponte	4
Citroën	Citroën DS3 R5	(Portugal) Citroën Vodafone Team	(Portugal) Carlos Martins	(Portugal) Daniel Amaral	4
Citroën	Citroën DS3 R5	(Portugal) Sports & You	(Portugal) Carlos Vieira	(Portugal) Jorge Carvalho	4
Citroën	Citroën DS3 R5	(Belgium) Burton Racing	(France) Stéphane Lefebvre	(Belgium) Xavier Portier	5
Citroën	Citroën DS3 R5	(Belgium) Burton Racing	(Belgium) Guillaume Dilley	(Belgium) Stéphane Prévot	5
Citroën	Citroën DS3 R5	(Czech Republic) Gemini Clinic Rally Team	(France) Bryan Bouffier	(France) Denis Giraudet	5
Citroën	Citroën DS3 R5	(Czech Republic) Gemini Clinic Rally Team	(France) Bryan Bouffier	(France) Xavier Panseri	7–8
Citroën	Citroën DS3 R5	(Belgium) Autostal Duinsitel VZW	(Belgium) Kevin Demaerschalk	(Belgium) Bram Eelbode	5
Citroën	Citroën DS3 R5	(Belgium) Autostal Duinsitel VZW	(Belgium) Yves Bruneel	(Belgium) Kristof Goethals	5
Citroën	Citroën DS3 R5	(Belgium) Autostal Duinsitel VZW	(Belgium) Tom Van Rompuy	(Belgium) Bert Feys	5
Citroën	Citroën DS3 R5	(Belgium) J-Motorsport	(Greece) Jourdan Serderidis	(Belgium) Geoffrey Brion	5
Peugeot	Peugeot 208 T16 R5	(Italy) Delta Rally	(France) Robert Consani	(France) Maxime Vilmot	1
Peugeot	Peugeot 208 T16 R5	(Italy) Delta Rally	(Italy) Giacomo Costenaro	(Italy) Justin Bardini	1, 4
Peugeot	Peugeot 208 T16 R5	(Italy) Delta Rally	(Switzerland) Federico Della Casa	(Italy) Domenico Pozzi	3
Peugeot	Peugeot 208 T16 R5	(United Kingdom) Euan Thorburn Rally Team	(United Kingdom) Euan Thorburn	(United Kingdom) Paul Beaton	2
Peugeot	Peugeot 208 T16 R5	Peugeot Belgium Luxembourg	(Belgium) Kris Princen	(Belgium) Peter Kaspers	5
Peugeot	Peugeot 208 T16 R5	(Belgium) Autostal Duinsistel VZW	(Belgium) Patrick Snijers	(Belgium) Cindy Verbaeten	5
Peugeot	Peugeot 208 T16 R5	(France) Peugeot Rally Academy	(Spain) José Antonio Suárez	(Spain) Cándido Carrera	6
Peugeot	Peugeot 207 S2000	(France) Ludo Conception	(France) Yves Saint Requier	(France) Beuno Brissart	5
Peugeot	Peugeot 208 R2	(Lithuania) Sports Racing Technologies	(Russia) Vasiliy Gryazin	(Russia) Dmitry Lebedik	6
Škoda	Škoda Fabia R5	(Czech Republic) Tlusťák Racing	(Czech Republic) Antonín Tlusťák	(Czech Republic) Ladislav Kučera	1–7
Škoda	Škoda Fabia R5	(Czech Republic) Tlusťák Racing	(Czech Republic) Antonín Tlusťák	(Czech Republic) Ivo Vybíral	8
Škoda	Škoda Fabia R5	Eurosol Racing Team Hungary	(Hungary) János Puskádi	(Hungary) Barnabás Gódor	1, 7
Škoda	Škoda Fabia R5	(Netherlands) Kobus Tuning	(Netherlands) Hermen Kobus	(Netherlands) Erik de Wild	1, 5
Škoda	Škoda Fabia R5	(Netherlands) Kobus Tuning	(Netherlands) Hermen Kobus	(Belgium) Davy Thierie	8
Škoda	Škoda Fabia R5	(United Kingdom) CA1 Sport Ltd	(United Kingdom) David Bogie	(United Kingdom) Kevin Rae	2
Škoda	Škoda Fabia R5	(Czech Republic) T&T Czech National Team	(Czech Republic) Jaromír Tarabus	(Czech Republic) Daniel Trunkát	2–3, 5–6, 8
Škoda	Škoda Fabia R5	(Latvia) Sports Racing Technologies	(Estonia) Raul Jeets	(Estonia) Andrus Toom	2–4, 6–7, 9
Škoda	Škoda Fabia R5	(Latvia) Sports Racing Technologies	(Latvia) Ralfs Sirmacis	(Latvia) Artūrs Šimins	3–4, 6, 8–10
Škoda	Škoda Fabia R5	(Latvia) Sports Racing Technologies	(Russia) Nikolay Gryazin	(Russia) Yaroslav Fedorov	10
Škoda	Škoda Fabia R5	(United Kingdom) Simpsons Škoda Motorsport	(United Kingdom) Neil Simpson	(United Kingdom) Elliott Edmondson	2
Škoda	Škoda Fabia R5	(Republic of Ireland) Mac Sport Rallying	(United Kingdom) Desi Henry	(Republic of Ireland) Liam Moynihan	2
Škoda	Škoda Fabia R5	Lascaris Foundation Team Greece	(Greece) Lambros Athanassoulas	(Greece) Nikolaos Zakheos	3
Škoda	Škoda Fabia R5	(Portugal) Sports & You	(Portugal) Pedro Meireles	(Portugal) Mário Castro	4
Škoda	Škoda Fabia R5	(Portugal) BP Ultimate Škoda Team	(Portugal) Miguel Barbosa	(Portugal) Miguel Ramalho	4
Škoda	Škoda Fabia R5	Culture & Sport Qatar Rally Team	(Qatar) Abdulaziz Al-Kuwari	(United Kingdom) Marshall Clarke	4
Škoda	Škoda Fabia R5	(Belgium) Go Drive Racing	(Belgium) Vincent Verschueren	(Belgium) Véronique Hostens	5
Škoda	Škoda Fabia R5	(France) 2C Competition	(Belgium) Freddy Loix	(Belgium) Johan Gitsels	5
Škoda	Škoda Fabia R5	(Belgium) Ice Pol Racing Team	(Belgium) Ghislain de Mévius	(Belgium) Johan Jalet	5
Škoda	Škoda Fabia R5	(Belgium) Autostal Duindistel VZW	(Belgium) Melissa Debackere	(Belgium) Cindy Cokelaere	5
Škoda	Škoda Fabia R5	(Belgium) Autostal Atlantic	(Belgium) Didier Duquesne	(Belgium) Diederik Pattyn	5
Škoda	Škoda Fabia R5	(Belgium) Autostal Atlantic	(Belgium) Fredericq Delplace	(Belgium) Wouter Polfliet	5
Škoda	Škoda Fabia R5	(Hungary) Topp-Cars Rallye Team	(Ukraine) Oleksiy Tamrazov	(Estonia) Kuldar Sikk	6
Škoda	Škoda Fabia R5	(Italy) Motorsport Italia	(Poland) Filip Nivette	(Poland) Kamil Heller	7
Škoda	Škoda Fabia R5	(Italy) Motorsport Italia	(Germany) Marijan Griebel	(Germany) Pirmin Winklhofer	10
Škoda	Škoda Fabia R5	(Czech Republic) Škoda Motorsport	(Czech Republic) Jan Kopecký	(Czech Republic) Pavel Dresler	8
Škoda	Škoda Fabia R5	(Czech Republic) Škoda Motorsport	(Germany) Fabian Kreim	(Germany) Frank Christian	8
Škoda	Škoda Fabia R5	(Czech Republic) Energy Oil Motorsport	(Czech Republic) Pavel Valoušek	(Czech Republic) Varonika Havelková	8
Škoda	Škoda Fabia R5	(Czech Republic) Mogul Czech National Team	(Czech Republic) Jan Černy	(Czech Republic) Petr Černohorský	8
Škoda	Škoda Fabia R5	(Slovakia) Rufa Sport	(Czech Republic) Tomáš Kostka	(Czech Republic) Ladislav Kučera	8
Škoda	Škoda Fabia R5	(Czech Republic) Klokočka Škoda Czech National Team	(Czech Republic) Vojtěch Štajf	(Czech Republic) František Rajnoha	8
Škoda	Škoda Fabia R5	(Finland) TGS Worldwide	(Latvia) Raimonds Kisiels	(Latvia) Arnis Ronis	9
Škoda	Skoda Fabia S2000	(United Kingdom) Tiger Risk Rally Team	(United Kingdom) Martin McCormack	(Republic of Ireland) David Moynihan	2
Škoda	Skoda Fabia S2000	(United Kingdom) Tiger Risk Rally Team	(United Kingdom) Martin McCormack	(Republic of Ireland) James O'Reilly	5
Škoda	Skoda Fabia S2000	(Republic of Ireland) Sharkey Motorsport	(Republic of Ireland) Joseph McGonigle	(Republic of Ireland) Ciaran Geaney	2
Škoda	Skoda Fabia S2000	(Portugal) ACB Racing	(Portugal) Manuel Castro	(Portugal) Luís Costa	4
Škoda	Skoda Fabia S2000	(Czech Republic) Svarmetal Motorsport	(Norway) Petter Kristiansen	(Norway) Ole Kristian Brennum	5
Škoda	Skoda Fabia S2000	(Czech Republic) Kimi Racing	(Czech Republic) Tomáš Růžička	(Czech Republic) Jaroslav Novák	8
Škoda	Skoda Fabia S2000	(Czech Republic) Kimi Racing	(Czech Republic) Miroslav Jakeš	(Czech Republic) Marcela Ehlová	8
Škoda	Skoda Fabia S2000	(Czech Republic) Sparrow Racing Team	(Czech Republic) Jan Jelínek	(Czech Republic) Petr Machů	8
Mitsubishi	Mitsubishi Lancer Evo X	(Cyprus) Costas Petrou Motors	(Cyprus) Petros Panteli	(Cyprus) Constantinos Constantinou	3
Mitsubishi	Mitsubishi Lancer Evo X	(Cyprus) Costas Petrou Motors	(Cyprus) Petros Panteli	(Cyprus) Yiannos Evripidou	10
Mitsubishi	Mitsubishi Lancer Evo X	(Cyprus) Costas Petrou Motors	(Cyprus) Michalis Posedias	(Cyprus) Georgios Alexandrou	10
Mitsubishi	Mitsubishi Lancer Evo X	(Latvia) Dynamic Sport	(Russia) Alexander Mikhaylov	(Latvia) Normunds Kokinš	6, 9
Mitsubishi	Mitsubishi Lancer Evo IX	(Latvia) Neikšāns Rally Sport	(Poland) Mikołaj Kempa	(Poland) Michał Grudziński	9
Mitsubishi	Mitsubishi Lancer Evo IX	(Latvia) Neikšāns Rally Sport	(Germany) Lazar Kan	(Russia) Dmitry Chumak	9
Mitsubishi	Mitsubishi Lancer Evo IX	(Cyprus) Psaltis Eneos Rally Team	(Cyprus) Stavros Antoniou	(Cyprus) Demetris Pieri	10
Mitsubishi	Mitsubishi Lancer Evo IX	(Cyprus) Telsa Rallysport	(Cyprus) Savvas Savva	(Cyprus) Andreas Papandreou	10

=== ERC-2 ===
Constructor	Car	Team	Driver	Co-driver	Rounds
Mitsubishi	Mitsubishi Lancer Evo X	(Spain) RMC Motorsport	(Italy) Giacomo Scattolon	(Italy) Paolo Zanini	1–2
Mitsubishi	Mitsubishi Lancer Evo X	(Spain) RMC Motorsport	(Argentina) Juan Carlos Alonso	(Argentina) Juan Pablo Monasterolo	1
Mitsubishi	Mitsubishi Lancer Evo X	(Hungary) Érdi Rally Team	(Hungary) Tibor Érdi	(Hungary) Gergely Patkó	1
Mitsubishi	Mitsubishi Lancer Evo X	(Hungary) Érdi Rally Team	(Hungary) Tibor Érdi	(Hungary) György Papp	3, 5, 7–8
Mitsubishi	Mitsubishi Lancer Evo X	(Lithuania) Pro Racing	(Hungary) Tibor Érdi	(Hungary) György Papp	9
Mitsubishi	Mitsubishi Lancer Evo X	(Lithuania) Pro Racing	(Argentina) Juan Carlos Alonso	(Argentina) Juan Pablo Monasterolo	3–4
Mitsubishi	Mitsubishi Lancer Evo X	(Lithuania) Pro Racing	(Paraguay) Jose Luis Jacquet	(Paraguay) Hermán Vargas Peña	3
Mitsubishi	Mitsubishi Lancer Evo X	(Latvia) ASRT Rally Team	(Estonia) Siim Plangi	(Estonia) Marek Sarapuu	6, 9
Mitsubishi	Mitsubishi Lancer Evo X	(Poland) C-Rally	(Poland) Filip Nivette	(Poland) Kamil Heller	6
Mitsubishi	Mitsubishi Lancer Evo X	(Poland) C-Rally	(Poland) Aron Domżała	(Poland) Szymon Gospodarczyk	6
Mitsubishi	Mitsubishi Lancer Evo X	(Estonia) ALM Motorsport	(Estonia) Mait Maarend	(Estonia) Mihkel Kapp	6
Mitsubishi	Mitsubishi Lancer Evo X	(Lithuania) EAMV Motorsport	(Russia) Alexey Lukyanuk	(Russia) Roman Kapustin	9
Mitsubishi	Mitsubishi Lancer Evo X	(Latvia) Vorobjovs Racing	(Latvia) Jānis Vorobjovs	(Latvia) Andris Mālnieks	9
Mitsubishi	Mitsubishi Lancer Evo X	(Latvia) Vãgi Racing	(Latvia) Mārtiņs Svilis	(Latvia) Ivo Pūķis	9
Mitsubishi	Mitsubishi Lancer Evo IX	(Hungary) Topp-Cars Rallye Team	(Hungary) Péter Ranga	(Hungary) Viktor Bán	1, 3
Mitsubishi	Mitsubishi Lancer Evo IX	(Hungary) Topp-Cars Rallye Team	(Italy) Giacomo Scattolon	(Italy) Paolo Zanini	3, 5, 8–9
Mitsubishi	Mitsubishi Lancer Evo IX	(Portugal) Team Além Mar	(Portugal) Ruben Rodrigues	(Portugal) Estêvaño Rodrigues	4
Mitsubishi	Mitsubishi Lancer Evo IX	(Portugal) Olavo Esteves Competição	(Portugal) Rui Moniz	(Portugal) Paulo Real	4
Mitsubishi	Mitsubishi Lancer Evo IX	(Estonia) ALM Motorsport	(Estonia) Rainer Aus	(Estonia) Simo Koskinen	6
Mitsubishi	Mitsubishi Lancer Evo IX	(Estonia) Kaur Motorsport	(Estonia) Egon Kaur	(Estonia) Silver Simm	6
Mitsubishi	Mitsubishi Lancer Evo IX	(Lithuania) Juta Bauer Rally Team	(Lithuania) Vytautas Švedas	(Lithuania) Žilvinas Sakalauskas	9
Mitsubishi	Mitsubishi Lancer Evo IX	(Latvia) Neikšāns Rally Sport	(Latvia) Maris Naikšāns	(Latvia) Anrijs Jesse	9
Mitsubishi	Mitsubishi Lancer Evo IX	(Cyprus) Petrolina – Eni Racing Team	(Cyprus) Christos Demosthenous	(Cyprus) Pambos Laos	10
Mitsubishi	Mitsubishi Lancer Evo IX	(Cyprus) Psaltis Auto Parts	(Cyprus) Costas Zenonos	(Cyprus) Phanos Christofi	10
Mitsubishi	Mitsubishi Lancer Evo IX	(Cyprus) Timotheou Rally Team	(Cyprus) Charalambos Timotheou	(Cyprus) Panayiotis Shialos	10
Mitsubishi	Mitsubishi Lancer Evo IX	(Cyprus) Psaltis Eneos Rally Team	(Cyprus) Panikos Polykarpou	(Austria) Gerald Winter	10
Mitsubishi	Mitsubishi Lancer Evo IX	(Cyprus) Antonis & Stavros Autoservice Ltd	(Cyprus) Nikolaos Georgiou	(Cyprus) Antonis Chrysostomou	10
Subaru	Subaru Impreza WRX STI	Subaru Poland Rally Team	(Poland) Wojciech Chuchała	(Poland) Daniel Dymurski	1–4, 7, 9
Subaru	Subaru Impreza WRX STI	(Portugal) ACB Racing	(Portugal) Pedro Vale	(Portugal) Rui Medeiros	4

=== ERC-3 ===
Constructor	Car	Team	Driver	Co-driver	Rounds
Renault	Renault Clio RS R3T	Eurosol Racing Team Hungary	(Hungary) Zoltán Bessenyey	(Hungary) Dávid Berendi	1, 3
Renault	Renault Clio RS R3T	(Portugal) Fernando Costa Motorsport	(Portugal) Gil Antunes	(Portugal) Diogo Correia	1, 4
Renault	Renault Clio RS R3T	(France) Renault Sport Technologies	(Portugal) João Correia	(Portugal) Ricardo Barreto	1–2
Renault	Renault Clio RS R3T	(Romania) Colina Motorsport	(Romania) Alex Filip	(Romania) Bogdan Iancu	3, 7
Renault	Renault Clio RS R3T	(Slovenia) Otkan Sport	(Slovenia) Aleks Humar	(Slovenia) Florjan Rus	5
Renault	Renault Clio R3	(Portugal) ARC Sport	(Portugal) José Monteiro	(Portugal) Sancho Eiró	4
Renault	Renault Clio R3	(Russia) Thomas Beton Racing	(Russia) Artur Muradian	(Russia) Pavel Chelebaev	8–9
Peugeot	Peugeot 208 R2	(Poland) Rally Technology	(Poland) Tomasz Gryc	(Poland) Michał Kuśnierz	1, 7
Peugeot	Peugeot 208 R2	(Poland) Rally Technology	(Poland) Łukasz Habaj	(Poland) Piotr Woś	1
Peugeot	Peugeot 208 R2	(Spain) Race Seven	(Portugal) Marco Cid	(Portugal) Nuno Rodrigues da Silva	1–2, 4–6
Peugeot	Peugeot 208 R2	(Slovenia) Oktan Sport	(Slovenia) Aleks Humar	(Slovenia) Florjan Rus	1–2
Peugeot	Peugeot 208 R2	(Hungary) Ritmu Ase	(Hungary) Szablcs Várkonyi	(Hungary) Botond Csányi	1–2, 9
Peugeot	Peugeot 208 R2	(Norway) Steve Røkland Motorsport	(Norway) Steve Røkland	(Sweden) Patrik Barth	2, 6
Peugeot	Peugeot 208 R2	(Latvia) Sports Racing Technologies	(Russia) Nikolay Gryazin	(Russia) Yaroslav Fedorov	2, 4–9
Peugeot	Peugeot 208 R2	(Hungary) Arable Racing Kft.	(Hungary) Lazlo Német	(Hungary) János Szegó	2, 5, 7–8
Peugeot	Peugeot 208 R2	(Portugal) Inside Motor	(Portugal) Diogo Gago	(Portugal) Hugo Magalhães	4–5
Peugeot	Peugeot 208 R2	(Finland) Joonas Tokee Racing Team	(Finland) Joonas Tokee	(Finland) Jani Salo	4–6, 9
Peugeot	Peugeot 208 R2	(France) Saintéloc Junior Team	(United Kingdom) Catie Munnings	(Germany) Anne Stein	5, 9
Peugeot	Peugeot 208 R2	(Hungary) Klausz Motorsport	(Hungary) Kristóf Klausz	(Hungary) Yulianna Nyírfás	5–6, 8–9
Peugeot	Peugeot 208 R2	(Hungary) F-Sport Média Kft.	(Hungary) Gergely Fogasy	(Hungary) Dávid Berendi	5
Peugeot	Peugeot 208 R2	(Estonia) Cueks Racing	(Estonia) Miko-Ove Niinemäe	(Estonia) Martin Valter	6, 9
Peugeot	Peugeot 208 R2	(Czech Republic) Studio Motorsport	(Czech Republic) Jiří Navrátil	(Czech Republic) Josef Král	8
Peugeot	Peugeot 208 R2	(Latvia) LMT Autosporta Akadēmija	(Latvia) Mārtiņš Sesks	(Latvia) Māris Kulšs	9
Opel	Opel Adam R2	(Poland) C-Rally	(Poland) Łukasz Pieniążek	(Poland) Przemek Mazur	1–6, 8–9
Opel	Opel Adam R2	(Spain) Red Opel España	(Poland) Aleks Zawada	(Poland) Grzegorz Dachowski	1
Opel	Opel Adam R2	(Germany) ADAC Opel Rallye Junior Team	(United Kingdom) Chris Ingram	(Germany) Katrin Becker	2, 4–5
Opel	Opel Adam R2	(Germany) ADAC Opel Rallye Junior Team	(United Kingdom) Chris Ingram	(United Kingdom) Elliott Edmondson	6, 8–9
Opel	Opel Adam R2	(Germany) ADAC Opel Rallye Junior Team	(Germany) Marijan Griebel	(Germany) Pirmin Winklhofer	2, 6, 8–9
Opel	Opel Adam R2	(Germany) ADAC Opel Rallye Junior Team	(Germany) Marijan Griebel	(Germany) Stefan Kopczyk	4–5
Opel	Opel Adam R2	(Germany) ADAC Opel Rallye Junior Team	(Germany) Julius Tannert	(Luxembourg) Jennifer Thielen	2, 4–6, 8–9
Opel	Opel Adam R2	(United Kingdom) Callum Devine Rallying	(United Kingdom) Callum Devine	(United States) Alex Kihurani	5
Opel	Opel Adam R2	(Finland) Bekason Oy	(Finland) Alex Forsström	(Finland) Jukka Jämsen	6, 9
Ford	Ford Fiesta R2T	(Turkey) Castrol Ford Team Türkiye	(Turkey) Murat Bostanci	(Turkey) Onur Vatansever	1, 3, 5, 7–10
Ford	Ford Fiesta R2T	(Turkey) Castrol Ford Team Türkiye	(Turkey) Buğra Banaz	(Turkey) Burak Erdener	3, 7, 10
Ford	Ford Fiesta R2T	(Turkey) Castrol Ford Team Türkiye	(Turkey) Ümit Can Özdemir	(Turkey) Sevilay Genç	3, 7
Ford	Ford Fiesta R2T	(Turkey) Castrol Ford Team Türkiye	(Turkey) Ümit Can Özdemir	(Turkey) Sedat Bostanci	10
Ford	Ford Fiesta R2T	(Poland) PZ Racing	(Portugal) Renato Pita	(Portugal) Mário Castro	2, 8
Ford	Ford Fiesta R2T	(Spain) RMC Motorsport	(Portugal) Renato Pita	(Portugal) Marco Macedo	4
Ford	Ford Fiesta R2T	(United Kingdom) M-Sport World Rally Team	(Norway) Steve Røkland	(Sweden) Patrik Barth	4
Ford	Ford Fiesta R2T	(Belgium) GPC Motorsport	(Belgium) Polle Geusens	(Belgium) Justine Demeestere	5
Ford	Ford Fiesta R2T	(Estonia) ME3 Motorsport	(Estonia) Gustav Kruuda	(Estonia) Ken Järveoja	6, 9
Ford	Ford Fiesta R2	(Czech Republic) TMS Czech National Junior Team	(Czech Republic) Dominik Brož	(Czech Republic) Petr Těšínský	2, 4–6, 8–9
Citroën	Citroën DS3 R3T	(Portugal) P&B Racing	(Portugal) Paulo Neto	(Portugal) Vítor Oliveira	4
Toyota	Toyota GT86 CS-R3	(Germany) Toyota Motorsport	(Italy) Luca Rossetti	(Italy) Eleonora Mori	8
Suzuki	Suzuki Swift Sport	(Russia) Morozov Rally Team	(Russia) Dmitry Morozov	(Russia) Maria Morozova	10
Suzuki	Suzuki Swift Sport	(Russia) Morozov Rally Team	(Russia) Leonid Lavrentiev	(Hungary) Zoltán Szechenyi	10

=== ERC Junior ===
Constructor	Car	Team	Driver	Co-driver	Rounds
Opel	Opel Adam R2	(Poland) C-Rally	(Poland) Łukasz Pieniążek	(Poland) Przemek Mazur	All
Opel	Opel Adam R2	(Germany) ADAC Opel Rallye Junior Team	(United Kingdom) Chris Ingram	(Germany) Katrin Becker	1–3
Opel	Opel Adam R2	(Germany) ADAC Opel Rallye Junior Team	(United Kingdom) Chris Ingram	(United Kingdom) Elliott Edmondson	4–6
Opel	Opel Adam R2	(Germany) ADAC Opel Rallye Junior Team	(Germany) Marijan Griebel	(Germany) Pirmin Winklhofer	1, 4–6
Opel	Opel Adam R2	(Germany) ADAC Opel Rallye Junior Team	(Germany) Marijan Griebel	(Germany) Stefan Kopczyk	2–3
Opel	Opel Adam R2	(Germany) ADAC Opel Rallye Junior Team	(Germany) Julius Tannert	(Luxembourg) Jennifer Thielen	All
Opel	Opel Adam R2	(United Kingdom) Callum Devine Rallying	(United Kingdom) Callum Devine	(United States) Alex Kihurani	3
Opel	Opel Adam R2	(Finland) Bekason Oy	(Finland) Alex Forsström	(Finland) Jukka Jämsen	4, 6
Peugeot	Peugeot 208 R2	(Norway) Steve Røkland Motorsport	(Norway) Steve Røkland	(Sweden) Patrik Barth	1, 4
Peugeot	Peugeot 208 R2	(Latvia) Sports Racing Technologies	(Russia) Nikolay Gryazin	(Russia) Yaroslav Fedorov	All
Peugeot	Peugeot 208 R2	(Spain) Race Seven	(Portugal) Marco Cid	(Portugal) Nuno Rodrigues da Silva	1–4
Peugeot	Peugeot 208 R2	(Portugal) Inside Motor	(Portugal) Diogo Gago	(Portugal) Hugo Magalhães	2–3
Peugeot	Peugeot 208 R2	(Finland) Joonas Tokee Racing Team	(Finland) Joonas Tokee	(Finland) Jani Salo	2–4, 6
Peugeot	Peugeot 208 R2	(France) Saintéloc Junior Team	(United Kingdom) Catie Munnings	(Germany) Anne Stein	3, 6
Peugeot	Peugeot 208 R2	(Hungary) Klausz Motorsport	(Hungary) Kristóf Klausz	(Hungary) Yulianna Nyírfás	3–6
Peugeot	Peugeot 208 R2	(Estonia) Cueks Racing	(Estonia) Miko-Ove Niinemäe	(Estonia) Martin Valter	4, 6
Peugeot	Peugeot 208 R2	(Latvia) LMT Autosporta Akadēmija	(Latvia) Mārtiņš Sesks	(Latvia) Māris Kulšs	6
Ford	Ford Fiesta R2	(Czech Republic) TMS Czech National Junior Team	(Czech Republic) Dominik Brož	(Czech Republic) Petr Těšínský	All
Ford	Ford Fiesta R2T	(United Kingdom) M-Sport World Rally Team	(Norway) Steve Røkland	(Sweden) Patrik Barth	2–3
Ford	Ford Fiesta R2T	(Estonia) ME3 Motorsport	(Estonia) Gustav Kruuda	(Estonia) Ken Järveoja	4, 6

=== Ladies Trophy ===
Constructor	Car	Team	Driver	Co-driver	Rounds
Škoda	Škoda Fabia R5	(Belgium) Autostal Duindistel VZW	(Belgium) Melissa Debackere	(Belgium) Cindy Cokelaere	5
Citroën	Citroën DS3 R3T	(Spain) Copi Sport	(Spain) Emma Falcón	(Spain) Rogelio Peñate	1
Citroën	Citroën C2 R2	(Romania) Napoca Rally Academy	(Bulgaria) Ekaterina Stratieva	(Bulgaria) Angel Bashkehayov	5, 8–9
Ford	Ford Fiesta R2	(United Kingdom) MH Motorsport	(United Kingdom) Nabila Tejpar	(United Kingdom) Fiona Scarrett	2
Peugeot	Peugeot 208 R2	(France) Saintéloc Junior Team	(United Kingdom) Catie Munnings	(Germany) Anne Stein	5, 9

== Results ==
Round	Rally name	Podium finishers			
Round	Rally name	Rank	Driver	Car	Time
1	(Spain) Rally Islas Canarias (10–12 March) — Results	1	(Russia) Alexey Lukyanuk	Ford Fiesta R5	2:13:52.4
1	(Spain) Rally Islas Canarias (10–12 March) — Results	2	(Poland) Kajetan Kajetanowicz	Ford Fiesta R5	2:14:25.1
1	(Spain) Rally Islas Canarias (10–12 March) — Results	3	(Spain) Luis Monzón	Citroën DS3 R5	2:15:43.8
2	(Northern Ireland) / (Republic of Ireland) Circuit of Ireland (7–9 April) — Results	1	(Republic of Ireland) Craig Breen	Citroën DS3 R5	1:54:16.1
2	(Northern Ireland) / (Republic of Ireland) Circuit of Ireland (7–9 April) — Results	2	(Poland) Kajetan Kajetanowicz	Ford Fiesta R5	1:54:26.7
2	(Northern Ireland) / (Republic of Ireland) Circuit of Ireland (7–9 April) — Results	3	(United Kingdom) Alastair Fisher	Ford Fiesta R5	1:55:12.5
3	(Greece) Acropolis Rally (6–8 May) — Results	1	(Latvia) Ralfs Sirmacis	Škoda Fabia R5	2:53:12.5
3	(Greece) Acropolis Rally (6–8 May) — Results	2	(Greece) Lambros Athanassoulas	Škoda Fabia R5	2:55:22.8
3	(Greece) Acropolis Rally (6–8 May) — Results	3	(Czech Republic) Jaromír Tarabus	Škoda Fabia R5	2:55:54.9
4	(Portugal) Rallye Açores (2–4 June) — Results	1	(Portugal) Ricardo Moura	Ford Fiesta R5	2:42:23.5
4	(Portugal) Rallye Açores (2–4 June) — Results	2	(Russia) Alexey Lukyanuk	Ford Fiesta R5	2:42:50.3
4	(Portugal) Rallye Açores (2–4 June) — Results	3	(Poland) Kajetan Kajetanowicz	Ford Fiesta R5	2:45:46.5
5	(Belgium) Ypres Rally (23–25 June) — Results	1	(Belgium) Freddy Loix	Škoda Fabia R5	2:22:15.1
5	(Belgium) Ypres Rally (23–25 June) — Results	2	(Belgium) Kris Princen	Peugeot 208 T16 R5	2:23:11.9
5	(Belgium) Ypres Rally (23–25 June) — Results	3	(Belgium) Bernd Casier	Ford Fiesta R5	2:23:34.9
6	Rally Estonia (15–17 July) — Results	1	(Latvia) Ralfs Sirmacis	Škoda Fabia R5	1:44:16.2
6	Rally Estonia (15–17 July) — Results	2	(Poland) Kajetan Kajetanowicz	Ford Fiesta R5	1:45:50.7
6	Rally Estonia (15–17 July) — Results	3	(Estonia) Rainer Aus	Mitsubishi Lancer Evo IX	1:48:01.0
7	(Poland) Rally Rzeszow (4–6 August) — Results	1	(Poland) Kajetan Kajetanowicz	Ford Fiesta R5	2:01:37.1
7	(Poland) Rally Rzeszow (4–6 August) — Results	2	(France) Bryan Bouffier	Citroën DS3 R5	2:02:23.1
7	(Poland) Rally Rzeszow (4–6 August) — Results	3	(Poland) Grzegorz Grzyb	Ford Fiesta R5	2:05:14.7
8	(Czech Republic) Barum Czech Rally Zlín (26–28 August) — Results	1	(Czech Republic) Jan Kopecký	Škoda Fabia R5	2:07:34.7
8	(Czech Republic) Barum Czech Rally Zlín (26–28 August) — Results	2	(Czech Republic) Tomáš Kostka	Škoda Fabia R5	2:10:08.7
8	(Czech Republic) Barum Czech Rally Zlín (26–28 August) — Results	3	(Czech Republic) Jan Černý	Škoda Fabia R5	2:10:16.6
9	(Latvia) Rally Liepāja–Ventspils (16–19 September) — Results	1	(Latvia) Ralfs Sirmacis	Škoda Fabia R5	1:43:11.2
9	(Latvia) Rally Liepāja–Ventspils (16–19 September) — Results	2	(Russia) Alexey Lukyanuk	Mitsubishi Lancer Evo X	1:44:15.5
9	(Latvia) Rally Liepāja–Ventspils (16–19 September) — Results	3	(Estonia) Siim Plangi	Mitsubishi Lancer Evo X	1:44:59.5
10	Cyprus Rally (7–9 October) — Results	1	(Russia) Alexey Lukyanuk	Ford Fiesta R5	2:06:55.9
10	Cyprus Rally (7–9 October) — Results	2	(Germany) Marijan Griebel	Škoda Fabia R5	2:09:08.1
10	Cyprus Rally (7–9 October) — Results	3	(Latvia) Ralfs Sirmacis	Škoda Fabia R5	2:09:51.9

== Championship standings ==
=== Points Systems ===
==== ERC, ERC-2, ERC-3 and ERC Junior ====
- For both the Drivers' and Teams' championships of the ERC, ERC-2 and ERC-3, only the best seven results will be retained by each driver or team.
- For both the Drivers' and Teams' championships of the ERC Junior, only the best four results will be retained by each driver or team.
- Points for final position are awarded as in following table:

Position	1st	2nd	3rd	4th	5th	6th	7th	8th	9th	10th
Points	25	18	15	12	10	8	6	4	2	1

- Bonus points awarded for position in each Leg

Position	1st	2nd	3rd	4th	5th	6th	7th
Points	7	6	5	4	3	2	1

==== Ladies Trophy ====
- For the Drivers' championship, only the best four results will be retained by each driver.
- Points for final position are awarded as in following table

Position	1st	2nd	3rd
Points	3	2	1

=== Drivers' Championships ===
==== ERC ====
Pos	Driver	CAN (Spain)	COI (United Kingdom)	ACR (Greece)	AZO (Portugal)	YPR (Belgium)	EST (Estonia)	RZE (Poland)	ZLÍ (Czech Republic)	LIE (Latvia)	CYP (Cyprus)	Points	Best 7
1	(Poland) Kajetan Kajetanowicz	2^{18+11}	2^{18+13}	8^{4+7}	3^{15+6}		2^{18+11}	1^{25+14}	47^{0+6}	4^{12+9}		187	181
2	(Russia) Aleksey Lukyanuk	1^{25+13}	DNS	10^{1+7}	2^{18+13}	Ret	Ret^{0+7}		15^{0+6}	2^{18+12}	1^{25+14}	159	159
3	(Latvia) Ralfs Sirmacis			1^{25+12}	Ret^{0+4}		1^{25+13}		Ret	1^{25+14}	3^{15+10}	143	143
4	(France) Bryan Bouffier					Ret^{0+7}		2^{18+12}	Ret^{0+5}			42	42
5	(Poland) Jarosław Kołtun	6^{8}	10^{1}	6^{8+2}	Ret		5^{10+4}	8^{4+1}		26^{0+3}		41	41
6	(Czech Republic) Jan Kopecký								1^{25+14}			39	39
7	(Hungary) David Botka	41	12	Ret	4^{12+5}	Ret		Ret	11	9^{2}	4^{12+8}	39	39
8	(Republic of Ireland) Craig Breen		1^{25+13}									38	38
9	(Belgium) Freddy Loix					1^{25+13}						38	38
10	(Estonia) Raul Jeets		25	4^{12+6}	Ret		4^{12+6}	9^{2}		Ret		38	38
11	(Portugal) Ricardo Moura				1^{25+12}							37	37
12	(Czech Republic) Jaromír Tarabus		Ret^{0+3}	3^{15+9}		7^{6}	Ret		Ret^{0+3}			36	36
13	(Poland) Wojciech Chuchała	5^{10+1}	11	5^{10+3}	13^{0+2}			7^{6+2}		Ret		34	34
14	(Germany) Marijan Griebel		19		Ret	13	9^{2}		50	14	2^{18+12}	33	33
15	(Poland) Lukasz Habaj	15					6^{8+5}	4^{12+5}	Ret	Ret^{0+2}		32	32
16	(Estonia) Siim Plangi						27^{0+5}			3^{15+9}		29	29
17	(Belgium) Kris Princen					2^{18+10}						28	28
18	(Greece) Lambros Athanassoulas			2^{18+9}							Ret	27	27
19	(Czech Republic) Tomáš Kostka								2^{18+7}			25	25
20	(Spain) Luis Monzón	3^{15+10}										25	25
21	(Poland) Grzegorz Grzyb							3^{15+9}				24	24
22	(United Kingdom) Alastair Fisher		3^{15+8}									23	23
23	(Poland) Tomasz Kasperczyk	10^{1}		7^{6+1}	25		12	6^{8+3}		8^{4}		23	23
24	(Czech Republic) Jan Černý								3^{15+7}			22	22
25	(Belgium) Bernd Casier					3^{15+6}						21	21
26	(Estonia) Rainer Aus						3^{15+5}					20	20
27	(Netherlands) Hermen Kobus	Ret^{0+2}				4^{12+6}			Ret			20	20
28	(Spain) Jonathan Pérez	4^{12+8}										20	20
29	(Republic of Ireland) Josh Moffett		4^{12+7}									19	19
30	(Belgium) Vincent Verschueren					5^{10+7}						17	17
31	(Poland) Jakub Brzezinski							5^{10+7}				17	17
32	(Czech Republic) Pavel Valoušek								4^{12+4}			16	16
33	(United Kingdom) Jonathan Greer		5^{10+4}									14	14
34	(Czech Republic) Jaroslav Orsak				5^{10+3}	Ret						13	13
35	(Cyprus) Christos Demosthenous										5^{10+3}	13	13
36	(Germany) Fabian Kreim								5^{10+1}			11	11
37	(Portugal) Pedro Meireles				6^{8+3}							11	11
38	(Belgium) Pieter Tsjoen					6^{8+3}						11	11
39	(France) Robert Consani	7^{6+5}	Ret	DNS	DNS							11	11
40	(Portugal) Luis Rego				7^{6+5}							11	11
41	(Latvia) Raimonds Kisiels									5^{10}		10	10
42	(United Kingdom) David Bogie		6^{8+2}									10	10
43	(Cyprus) "Chips jr."										6^{8+2}	10	10
44	(Czech Republic) Martin Vlček								6^{8+1}			9	9
45	(Latvia) Maris Neikšans									6^{8+1}		9	9
46	(Latvia) Martinš Svilis									7^{6+2}		8	8
47	(Cyprus) Costas Zenonos										7^{6+2}	8	8
48	(Republic of Ireland) Stephen Wright		7^{6+1}									7	7
49	(Estonia) Miko-Ove Niinemäe						7^{6}			16		6	6
50	(Czech Republic) Vojtĕch Štajf								7^{6}			6	6
51	(Portugal) Jose Pedro Fontes				8^{4+2}							6	6
52	(Czech Republic) Antonin Tlusták	33^{0+2}	13	Ret	10^{1}	10^{1}	DNS	10^{1}	12			5	5
53	(Cyprus) Panikos Polykarpou										11^{0+5}	5	5
54	(Russia) Alexander Mikhaylov						8^{4}			12		4	4
55	(Hungary) János Puskádi	8^{4}						Ret				4	4
56	(United Kingdom) Tom Cave		8^{4}									4	4
57	(Belgium) Claudie Tanghe					8^{4}						4	4
58	(Czech Republic) Miroslav Jakeš								8^{4}			4	4
59	(Cyprus) Savvas Savva										8^{4}	4	4
60	(United Kingdom) Martin McCormack		Ret^{0+4}									4	4
61	(Czech Republic) Roman Odložilík								10^{1+2}			3	3
62	(Portugal) Ricardo Teodosio				9^{2+1}							3	3
63	(Belgium) Kevin Demaerschalk	Ret^{0+1}				9^{2}						3	3
64	(Poland) Filip Nivette		DNS				DNS	11^{0+3}				3	3
65	(Switzerland) Federico Della Casa	39^{0+3}	Ret	Ret								3	3
66	(France) Stephane Lefebvre					Ret^{0+3}						3	3
67	(Latvia) Jānis Vorobjovs									Ret^{0+3}		3	3
68	(Belgium) Cédric Cherain								9^{2}			2	2
69	(Spain) Suhayén Pernía	9^{2}										2	2
70	(Republic of Ireland) Joseph McGonigle		9^{2}									2	2
71	(Paraguay) Jose Luis Rios			9^{2}								2	2
72	(Cyprus) Michalis Posedias										9^{2}	2	2
73	(United Kingdom) Chris Ingram		18		17	14	10^{1}		20	Ret		1	1
74	(Lithuania) Vytautas Švedas									10^{1}		1	1
75	(Cyprus) Stavros Antoniou										10^{1}	1	1
76	(Norway) Frank Tore Larsen									11^{0+1}		1	1
77	(Italy) Giacomo Costenaro	Ret^{0+1}			Ret							1	1
78	(Sweden) Fredrik Åhlin		Ret^{0+1}									1	1

Key
Colour	Result
Gold	Winner
Silver	2nd place
Bronze	3rd place
Green	Points finish
Blue	Non-points finish
Blue	Non-classified finish (NC)
Purple	Did not finish (Ret)
Black	Excluded (EX)
Black	Disqualified (DSQ)
White	Did not start (DNS)
White	Cancelled (C)
Blank	Withdrew entry from the event (WD)

==== ERC-2 ====
Pos	Driver	CAN (Spain)	COI (United Kingdom)	ACR (Greece)	AZO (Portugal)	YPR (Belgium)	EST (Estonia)	RZE (Poland)	ZLÍ (Czech Republic)	LIE (Latvia)	CYP (Cyprus)	Points	Best 7
1	(Poland) Wojciech Chuchała	1^{25+14}	1^{25+14}	1^{25+14}	1^{25+13}			1^{25+14}		Ret^{0+4}		198	198
2	(Italy) Giacomo Scattolon	3^{15+10}	2^{18+12}	4^{12}		1^{25+7}			1^{25+14}	Ret		142	142
3	(Hungary) Tibor Érdi	5^{10+6}		3^{15+9}		Ret^{0+7}		2^{18+12}	2^{18+6}	5^{10+2}		110	110
4	(Argentina) Juan Carlos Alonso	4^{12+9}		5^{10}	3^{15+9}							61	61
5	(Estonia) Siim Plangi						3^{15+7}			2^{18+12}		52	52
6	(Russia) Alexey Lukyanuk									1^{25+14}		39	39
7	(Estonia) Rainer Aus						1^{25+13}					38	38
8	(Cyprus) Christos Demosthenous										1^{25+11}	36	36
9	(Hungary) Péter Ranga	2^{18+11}		Ret^{0+6}								35	35
10	(Portugal) Ruben Rodrigues				2^{18+13}							31	31
11	(Estonia) Mait Maarend						2^{18+11}					29	29
12	(Paraguay) Jose Luis Rios			2^{18+11}								29	29
13	(Cyprus) "Chips jr."										2^{18+10}	28	28
14	(Cyprus) Costas Zenonas										3^{15+10}	25	25
15	(Cyprus) Panikos Polykarpou										4^{12+13}	25	25
16	(Latvia) Maris Neikšans									3^{15+7}		22	22
17	(Latvia) Martinš Svilis									4^{12+7}		19	19
18	(Portugal) Rui Moniz				4^{12+4}							16	16
19	(Lithuania) Vytautas Švedas									5^{10+4}		14	14
20	(Portugal) Pedro Vale				Ret^{0+5}							5	5
21	(Latvia) Jānis Vorobjovs									Ret^{0+5}		5	5

==== ERC-3 ====
Pos	Driver	CAN (Spain)	COI (United Kingdom)	ACR (Greece)	AZO (Portugal)	YPR (Belgium)	EST (Estonia)	RZE (Poland)	ZLÍ (Czech Republic)	LIE (Latvia)	CYP (Cyprus)	Points	Best 7
1	(United Kingdom) Chris Ingram		2^{18+11}		2^{18+10}	2^{18+11}	3^{15+9}		1^{25+11}	Ret^{0+6}		152	152
2	(Germany) Marijan Griebel		3^{15+11}		Ret^{0+7}	1^{25+14}	2^{18+10}		8^{4+7}	1^{25+14}		150	150
3	(Turkey) Murat Bostancı	6^{8+6}		1^{25+14}		9^{2}		3^{15+9}	6^{8+5}	7^{6}	1^{25+14}	137	137
4	(Latvia) Nikolay Gryazin		4^{12+10}		Ret	Ret	Ret^{0+6}	1^{25+14}	4^{12+5}	10^{1+4}		89	89
5	(Poland) Łukasz Pieniążek	9^{2+5}	1^{25+12}	Ret	Ret^{0+4}	Ret^{0+3}	9^{2+1}		3^{15+11}	Ret		80	80
6	(Estonia) Miko-Ove Niinemäe						1^{25+12}			3^{15+8}		60	60
7	(Hungary) Zoltán Bessenyey	2^{18+9}		2^{18+12}								57	57
8	(Hungary) László Német		5^{10+4}			5^{10+3}		2^{18+11}	Ret^{0+1}			57	57
9	(Germany) Julius Tannert		9^{2+3}		Ret	4^{12+8}	5^{10+3}		Ret	6^{8+6}		52	52
10	(Finland) Joonas Tokee				4^{12+5}	7^{6+1}	6^{8+3}			5^{10+3}		48	48
11	(Romania) Alexandru Filip			3^{15+10}				4^{12+7}				44	44
12	(Poland) Łukasz Habaj	1^{25+14}										39	39
13	(Portugal) Diogo Gago				1^{25+13}	Ret						38	38
14	(Finland) Alex Forsstrom						10^{1+2}			2^{18+10}		31	31
15	(Turkey) Bugra Banaz										2^{18+12}	30	30
16	(Czech Republic) Dominik Brož		7^{6+1}		7^{6+1}	6^{8+2}	11		7^{6}	Ret		30	30
17	(Italy) Luca Rossetti								2^{18+11}			29	29
18	(Poland) Tomasz Gryc	3^{15+7}						Ret^{0+6}				28	28
19	(Belgium) Polle Guesens					3^{15+11}						26	26
20	(Turkey) Ümit Can Özdemir										3^{15+10}	25	25
21	(Norway) Steve Rokland		Ret		3^{15+8}		DNS					23	23
22	(Estonia) Gustav Kruuda						4^{12+10}					22	22
23	(Portugal) Marco Cid	Ret	10^{1}		5^{10+4}	Ret	8^{4}					19	19
24	(Portugal) Gil Antunes	5^{10+3}			8^{4+1}							18	18
25	(Slovenia) Aleks Humar	4^{12+5}				Ret						17	17
26	(Latvia) Mārtiņš Sesks									4^{12+5}		17	17
27	(Czech Republic) Jiří Navrátil								5^{10+5}			15	15
28	(Hungary) Kristof Klausz					10^{1}	7^{6}		9^{2}	8^{4}		11	11
29	(Hungary) Szabolcs Várkonyi	7^{6+1}	8^{4+1}							Ret		12	12
30	(Portugal) Paulo Neto				6^{8+3}							11	11
31	(Portugal) Renato Pita		6^{8+3}		Ret							11	11
32	(Poland) Aleksander Zawada	10^{1+6}										7	7
33	(Hungary) Gergely Fogasy					8^{4+1}						7	7
34	(Portugal) João Correia	8^{4}	DNS									4	4
35	(Portugal) Jose Monteiro				9^{2}							2	2
36	(Republic of Ireland) Callum Devine					Ret^{0+2}						2	2
37	(United Kingdom) Catie Munnings					11				9^{2}		2	2

==== Ladies Trophy ====
Pos	Driver	CAN (Spain)	COI (United Kingdom)	ACR (Greece)	AZO (Portugal)	YPR (Belgium)	EST (Estonia)	RZE (Poland)	ZLÍ (Czech Republic)	LIE (Latvia)	CYP (Cyprus)	Points	Best 4
1	(United Kingdom) Catie Munnings					1				1		6	6
2	(Spain) Emma Falcón	1										3	3
3	(United Kingdom) Nabila Tejpar		1									3	3
4	(Bulgaria) Ekaterina Stratieva								1			3	3

==== ERC Junior ====
Pos	Driver	COI (United Kingdom)	AZO (Portugal)	YPR (Belgium)	EST (Estonia)	ZLÍ (Czech Republic)	LIE (Latvia)	Points	Best 4
1	(Germany) Marijan Griebel	3^{15+11}	Ret^{0+7}	1^{25+14}	2^{18+10}	5^{10+7}	1^{25+14}	156	132
2	(United Kingdom) Chris Ingram	2^{18+11}	2^{18+10}	2^{18+12}	3^{15+9}	1^{25+12}	Ret^{0+6}	154	124
3	(Poland) Łukasz Pieniążek	1^{25+12}	Ret^{0+4}	Ret^{0+4}	9^{2+1}	2^{18+12}	Ret	78	74
4	(Germany) Julius Tannert	6^{8+4}	Ret	3^{15+10}	5^{10+3}	Ret	6^{8+6}	64	64
5	(Estonia) Miko-Ove Niinemäe				1^{25+12}		3^{15+8}	60	60
6	(Czech Republic) Dominik Brož	5^{10+4}	6^{8+2}	4^{12+5}	11	4^{12+7}	Ret	60	60
7	(Latvia) Nikolay Gryazin	4^{12+10}	Ret	Ret	Ret^{0+6}	3^{15+9}	9^{2+4}	58	58
8	(Finland) Joonas Tokee		4^{12+6}	5^{10+2}	6^{8+3}		5^{10+3}	54	54
9	(Portugal) Diogo Gago		1^{25+13}	Ret				38	38
10	(Hungary) Kristof Klausz			6^{8+3}	7^{6}	6^{8+2}	7^{6}	33	33
11	(Finland) Alex Forsstrom				10^{1+2}		2^{18+10}	31	31
12	(Portugal) Marco Cid	7^{6+4}	5^{10+5}	Ret	8^{4}			29	29
13	(Norway) Steve Rokland	Ret	3^{15+8}		DNS			23	23
14	(Estonia) Gustav Kruuda				4^{12+10}			22	22
15	(Latvia) Mārtiņš Sesks						4^{12+5}	17	17
16	(United Kingdom) Catie Munnings			7^{6+2}			8^{4}	12	12
18	(Republic of Ireland) Callum Devine			Ret^{0+3}				3	3

=== Teams' Championships ===
==== ERC ====
Pos	Team	CAN (Spain)	COI (United Kingdom)	ACR (Greece)	AZO (Portugal)	YPR (Belgium)	EST (Estonia)	RZE (Poland)	ZLÍ (Czech Republic)	LIE (Latvia)	CYP (Cyprus)	Points
1	(Poland) Lotos Rally Team	1	1	6	1		2	1	10	2		145
2	(Latvia) Sports Racing Technologies		5	1	Ret		1	7		1	1	106
3	(Poland) C-Rally	3	2	4	Ret		3	6		6		76
4	(Hungary) Botka Rally Team	8	3	Ret	2			Ret	7	5	2	71
5	(Poland) Tiger Energy Drink Rallye Team	5		5	7		5	5		4		58
6	(Czech Republic) Tlusták Racing	7	4	Ret	4	4		8	8			50
7	(Czech Republic) T&T Czech National Team		Ret	3		3	Ret		Ret			38
8	(Slovakia) Rufa Sport							3	2			33
9	(Czech Republic) Škoda Motorsport								1			25
10	Peugeot Belgium Luxembourg					1						25
11	(Poland) Rally Technology						4	4				24
12	Lascaris Foundation Team Greece			2							Ret	18
13	(Czech Republic) Gemini Clinic Rally Team					Ret		2				18
14	(Spain) Auto Laca Competición	2										18
15	(Belgium) Autostal Duindistel					2						18
16	(Czech Republic) Kimi Team				3				9			17
17	(Czech Republic) Mogul Czech National Team								3			15
18	(Finland) TGS Worldwide OU									3		15
19	(Cyprus) Antonis & Stavros Auto Service Ltd										3	15
20	Eurosol Racing Team Hungary	4										12
21	(Czech Republic) Energy Oil Motorsport								4			12
22	(Cyprus) Psaltis Autoparts										4	12
23	(Portugal) BP Ultimate Skoda Team				5							10
24	(Belgium) Autostal Atlantic					5						10
25	(Czech Republic) Svarmetal Motorsport								5			10
26	(Portugal) Sports & You				6							8
27	(Germany) ADAC Opel Rallye Junior Team					6						8
28	(Spain) Peña Autocross Arteixo	6										8

==== ERC-2 ====
Pos	Driver	CAN (Spain)	COI (United Kingdom)	ACR (Greece)	AZO (Portugal)	YPR (Belgium)	EST (Estonia)	RZE (Poland)	ZLÍ (Czech Republic)	LIE (Latvia)	CYP (Cyprus)	Points
1	Subaru Poland Rally Team	1	1	1	1			1				125
2	(Latvia) ASRT Rally Team						2			1		33
3	(Estonia) ALM Motorsport						1					25
4	(Cyprus) Stavros & Antonis Auto Service Ltd										1	25
5	(Hungary) Topp-Cars Rallye Team	2		Ret								18
6	(Latvia) Neikšans Rally Sport									2		18
7	(Cyprus) Psaltis Auto Parts										2	18
8	(Lithuania) Všļ Čapkauskas Autosportas									3		15

==== ERC-3 ====
Pos	Driver	CAN (Spain)	COI (United Kingdom)	ACR (Greece)	AZO (Portugal)	YPR (Belgium)	EST (Estonia)	RZE (Poland)	ZLÍ (Czech Republic)	LIE (Latvia)	CYP (Cyprus)	Points
1	Castrol Ford Team Turkey	3		1		5		3	3	5	1	105
2	(Germany) ADAC Opel Rallye Junior Team		2		Ret	1	2		5	1		96
3	(Germany) Opel Rallye Junior Team		1		1		3		1			90
4	(Latvia) Sports Racing Technologies		3		Ret		Ret	1	2	7		64
5	(Czech Republic) TMS Czech National Junior Team		5		2	3	7		4			61
6	(Hungary) Arable Racing KFT		4			2		2				48
7	(Estonia) Cueks Racing						1			3		40
8	Eurosol Racing Team Hungary	2		2								36
9	(Finland) Bekason Oy						6			2		26
10	(Hungary) Klausz Motorsport					6	5			6		26
11	(Poland) Rally Technology	1										25
12	(Hungary) Ritmu ASE	4	6									20
13	(Estonia) ME3 Motorsport						4					12
14	(Hungary) F-Sport Media Kft					4						12
15	(Latvia) LMT Autosporta Akadēmija									4		12
