= 2016 Rally Islas Canarias =

2016 Rally Islas Canarias: 40. Rally Islas Canarias - El Corte Inglés 2016
Round 1 of 10 of the 2016 European Rally Championship
Next event →
- Host country: Spain
- Dates run: 10 – 12 March 2016
- Stage surface: Asphalt

Statistics
- Crews: 55 at start, 46 at finish

Overall results
- Overall winner: (Russia) Alexey Lukyanuk; Ford Fiesta R5

The 2016 Rally Islas Canarias was the first round of the 2016 European Rally Championship season, held in the Canary Islands between 10-12 March 2016.

The rally was won by Alexey Lukyanuk for him to lead the championship, and it continued his winning streak from the last event of the 2015 season. The WRC rally-winner and current Ford works driver Mads Østberg retired early on his ERC début after having led from stage one. In the latter stages, the field was headed by a non-registered local competitor, Enrique Cruz, who won this rally outright, so Lukyanuk won the ERC portion of the event. The WRC-2 winner was Wojciech Chuchala. The WRC-3 winner was Lukasz Habaj. The ERC ladies winner was Emma Falcon.

== Results ==
Pos	No	Driver	Co-driver	Car	Time	Points
1	2	(Russia) Alexey Lukyanuk	(Russia) Alexey Arnautov	Ford Fiesta R5	2:13:52.4	38
