= 2016 Rally Estonia =

Round of European Rally Championship, held in Estonia

2016 Rally Estonia: 7. auto24 Rally Estonia 2016
Round 6 of 10 of the 2016 European Rally Championship
← Previous event	Next event →
- Host country: Estonia
- Rally base: Otepää, Valga County
- Dates run: 15 – 17 July 2016
- Start location: Tartu, Tartu County
- Finish location: Saverna, Põlva County
- Stages: 16 (212.73 km; 132.18 miles)
- Stage surface: Gravel

Statistics
- Crews: 40 at start, 28 at finish

Overall results
- Overall winner: (Latvia) Ralfs Sirmacis (Latvia) Māris Kulšs (Latvia) Sports Racing Technologies; 1:44:16.2

The auto24 Rally Estonia 2016 was the seventh running of the Rally Estonia and also the sixth round of the 2016 European Rally Championship season. The event was won by Ralfs Sirmacis & Māris Kulšs after Alexey Lukyanuk & Alexey Arnautov crashed out from the lead on the penultimate stage.

== Report ==
Icon	Cup
ERC-2	ERC-2
ERC-3	ERC-3
J	ERC Junior

=== Classification ===
Pos.		No.	Driver	Co-driver	Team	Car	Cup	Time	Difference	Points	
Event	Class	No.	Driver	Co-driver	Team	Car	Cup	Time	Difference	Class	Bonus
Overall classification
1		3	(Latvia) Ralfs Sirmacis	(Latvia) Māris Kulšs	(Latvia) Sports Racing Technologies	Škoda Fabia R5		1:44:16.2	0.0	25	13
2		1	(Poland) Kajetan Kajetanowicz	(Poland) Jarosław Baran	(Poland) Lotos Rally Team	Ford Fiesta R5		1:45:50.7	+1:34.5	18	11
3		15	(Estonia) Rainer Aus	(Estonia) Simo Koskinen	(Estonia) ALM Motorsport	Mitsubishi Lancer Evo IX	ERC-2	1:48:01.0	+3:44.8	15	5
4		6	(Estonia) Raul Jeets	(Estonia) Andrus Toom	(Latvia) Sports Racing Technologies	Škoda Fabia R5		1:48:19.6	+4:03.4	12	6
5		5	(Poland) Jarosław Kołtun	(Poland) Ireneusz Pleskot	(Poland) C-Rally	Ford Fiesta R5		1:49:18.5	+5:02.3	10	4
6		11	(Poland) Łukasz Habaj	(Poland) Piotr Woś	(Poland) Rally Technology	Ford Fiesta R5		1:52:23.8	+8:07.6	8	5
7		28	(Estonia) Miko-Ove Niinemäe	(Estonia) Martin Valter	(Estonia) Cueks Racing	Peugeot 208 R2	ERC-3 J	1:54:52.2	+10:36.0	6	
8		34	(Russia) Alexander Mikhaylov	(Latvia) Normunds Kokins	(Latvia) Dynamic Sport	Mitsubishi Lancer Evo X		1:55:16.5	+11:00.3	4	
9		23	(Germany) Marijan Griebel	(Germany) Pirmin Winklhofer	(Germany) ADAC Opel Rallye Junior Team	Opel Adam R2	ERC-3 J	1:55:32.0	+11:15.8	2	
10		21	(United Kingdom) Chris Ingram	(United Kingdom) Elliott Edmondson	(Germany) ADAC Opel Rallye Junior Team	Opel Adam R2	ERC-3 J	1:55:36.7	+11:20.5	1	
ERC-2 Cup standings
3	1	15	(Estonia) Rainer Aus	(Estonia) Simo Koskinen	(Estonia) ALM Motorsport	Mitsubishi Lancer Evo IX	ERC-2	1:48:01.0	0.0	25	13
19	2	20	(Estonia) Mait Maarend	(Estonia) Mihkel Kapp	(Estonia) ALM Motorsport	Mitsubishi Lancer Evo X	ERC-2	2:04:53.1	+16:52.1	18	11
27	3	17	(Estonia) Siim Plangi	(Estonia) Marek Sarapuu	(Latvia) ASRT Rally Team	Mitsubishi Lancer Evo X	ERC-2	2:33:42.6	+45:41.6	15	7
ERC-3 Cup / ERC Junior Cup standings
7	1	28	(Estonia) Miko-Ove Niinemäe	(Estonia) Martin Valter	(Estonia) Cueks Racing	Peugeot 208 R2	ERC-3 J	1:54:52.2	0.0	25	12
9	2	23	(Germany) Marijan Griebel	(Germany) Pirmin Winklhofer	(Germany) ADAC Opel Rallye Junior Team	Opel Adam R2	ERC-3 J	1:55:32.0	+39.8	18	10
10	3	21	(United Kingdom) Chris Ingram	(United Kingdom) Elliott Edmondson	(Germany) ADAC Opel Rallye Junior Team	Opel Adam R2	ERC-3 J	1:55:36.7	+44.5	15	9

=== Special stages ===
Date	No.	Stage name	Distance	Winners	Car	Time	Rally leaders
15 July	SS1	Tartu City	1.33 km	Lukyanuk / Arnautov	Ford Fiesta R5	1:04.5	Lukyanuk / Arnautov
16 July	SS2	Kengu 1	14.53 km	Lukyanuk / Arnautov	Ford Fiesta R5	6:44.1	Lukyanuk / Arnautov
16 July	SS3	Raiga 1	10.48 km	Lukyanuk / Arnautov	Ford Fiesta R5	4:59.9	Lukyanuk / Arnautov
16 July	SS4	Kengu 2	14.53 km	Sirmacis / Kulšs	Škoda Fabia R5	6:40.8	Lukyanuk / Arnautov
16 July	SS5	Raiga 2	10.48 km	Sirmacis / Kulšs	Škoda Fabia R5	4:57.0	Lukyanuk / Arnautov
16 July	SS6	Rüa 1	29.97 km	Lukyanuk / Arnautov	Ford Fiesta R5	15:22.1	Lukyanuk / Arnautov
16 July	SS7	Arula 1	8.76 km	Lukyanuk / Arnautov	Ford Fiesta R5	4:10.5	Lukyanuk / Arnautov
16 July	SS8	Rüa 2	29.97 km	Sirmacis / Kulšs	Škoda Fabia R5	15:16.7	Lukyanuk / Arnautov
16 July	SS9	Arula 2	8.76 km	Sirmacis / Kulšs	Škoda Fabia R5	4:08.3	Lukyanuk / Arnautov
16 July	SS10	Elva	1.66 km	Jeets / Toom	Škoda Fabia R5	1:30.7	Lukyanuk / Arnautov
17 July	SS11	Ristimäe 1	19.96 km	Lukyanuk / Arnautov	Ford Fiesta R5	9:53.6	Lukyanuk / Arnautov
17 July	SS12	Vissi 1	13.32 km	Lukyanuk / Arnautov	Ford Fiesta R5	6:02.4	Lukyanuk / Arnautov
17 July	SS13	Saverna 1	7.85 km	Lukyanuk / Arnautov	Ford Fiesta R5	3:36.0	Lukyanuk / Arnautov
17 July	SS14	Ristimäe 2	19.96 km	Lukyanuk / Arnautov	Ford Fiesta R5	9:44.5	Lukyanuk / Arnautov
17 July	SS15	Vissi 2	13.32 km	Sirmacis / Kulšs	Škoda Fabia R5	5:56.1	Sirmacis / Kulšs
17 July	SS16	Saverna 2	7.85 km	Sirmacis / Kulšs	Škoda Fabia R5	3:34.3	Sirmacis / Kulšs
