= Vytautas Švedas =

Lithuanian rally driver (born 1983)

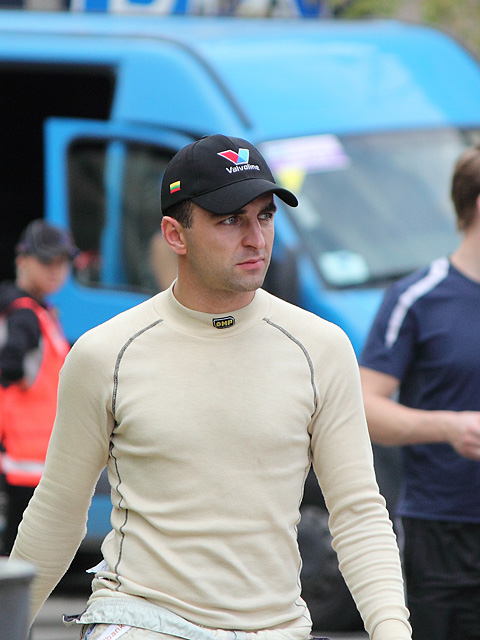
- Švedas at 2011 „300 Lakes Rally“
- Nationality: (Lithuania) Lithuanian
- Born: 7 January 1983 (age 43)

Lithuanian Rally Championship career
- Debut season: 2002
- Current team: Juta Racing
- Car number: 3
- Starts: 42
- Wins: 7
- Podiums: 12
- Best finish: 1st in 2005, 2006, 2007, 2008, 2011, 2013, 2015

Previous series
- WRC, ERC

Championship titles
- 2005, 2006, 2007, 2008, 2011, 2013, 2015: Lithuanian Rally Championship

Vytautas Švedas (born 7 January 1983) is a Lithuanian rally driver, currently driving for Juta Racing in Lithuanian Rally Championship. He is a seven-time Lithuanian rally champion, having won his recent championship in 2015.

== 2000–2001: Early Career ==
Vytautas Švedas began his auto racing career in 2000, driving a Volkswagen Polo. That year he finished second in N-1400 class of Lithuanian rallycross championship. Next year he triumphed in N-1600 class.

== 2002–present: Rallying ==
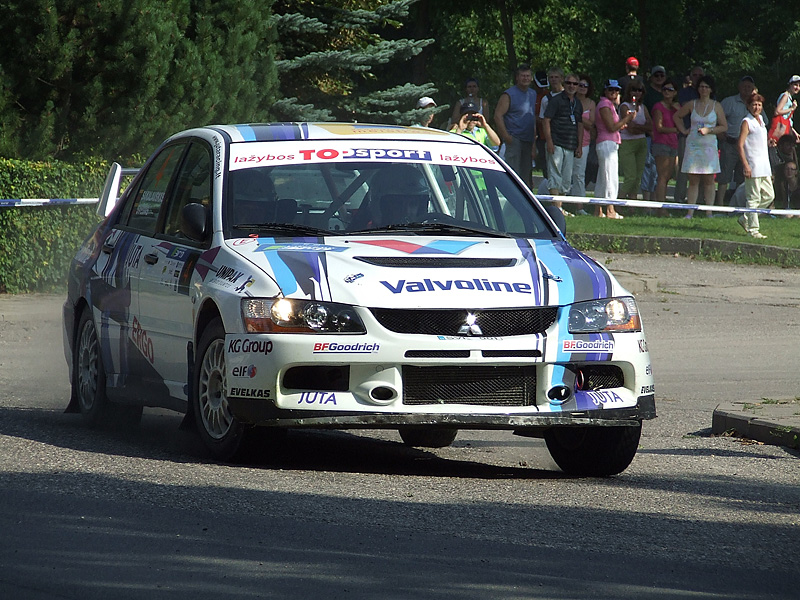

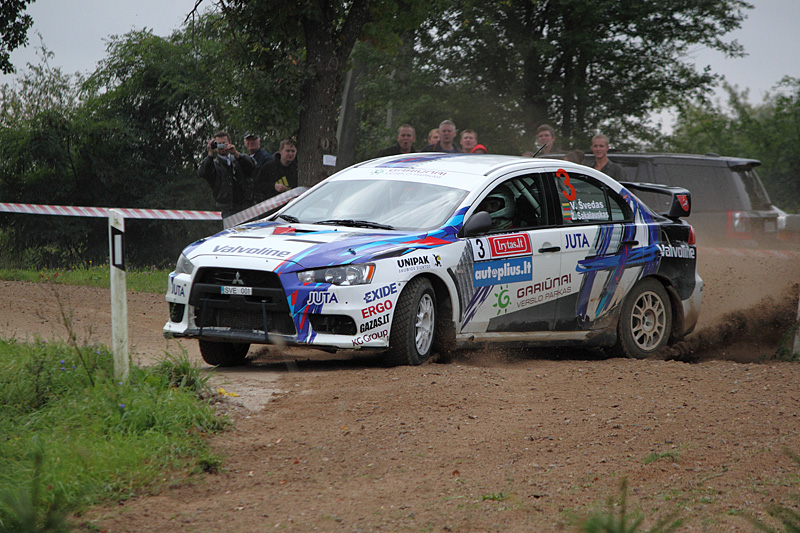
Vytautas Švedas updated from EVO VII to EVO IX (top) in 2006, and again updated to EVO X (bottom) in 2011.

Švedas made his rally debut in Lithuanian Rally Championship in 2002 and together with co-driver Kęstutis Švedas became vice champions in A,R-1600 class. He placed 17th in overall standings. Next year he repeated the same achievement in A,R-1600 class, this time with co-driver Ernestas Staponkus. Žilvinas Sakalauskas became Švedas's co-driver for 2004 season. He also got a new rally car, seventh generation Mitsubishi Lancer Evolution, and finished third in N/S-4 class.

Vytautas Švedas took his first N-4 class championship title in 2005 and repeated the same fate in 2006. In the same year he finished fourth in Estonian rally championship and made his debut in WRC, competing in Rally Finland.

Švedas successfully defended his N-4 title in 2007 and 2008. However, in 2009 he finished as runner-up, but regained his title in 2011. After finishing second in 2012, Švedas won his sixth title in 2013 and added one more in 2015.

During his career Švedas had started in six WRC rounds, with best result of 15th in 2009 Rally Poland. He also started in four ERC events, with eight in 2013 Rally Liepāja–Ventspils as a best result.

== Racing record ==
=== Complete WRC results ===
Year	Car	No	Team	1	2	3	4	5	6	7	8	9	10	11	12	13	14	15	WDC	Points	TC	Points	
2006	Mitsubishi Lancer EVO IX	76	(Lithuania) Juta Racing	MON	SWE	MEX	ESP	FRA	ARG	ITA	GRE	GER	FIN; Ret	JPN	CYP	TUR	AUS	NZL	GBR	–	0	–	0
2007	Mitsubishi Lancer EVO IX	85	(Lithuania) Juta Racing	MON	SWE	NOR	MEX	POR	ARG	ITA	GRE	FIN; Ret	GER	NZL	ESP	FRA	JPN	IRE	GBR	–	0	–	0
2008	Mitsubishi Lancer EVO IX	68/80	(Lithuania) Juta Racing	MON	SWE; Ret	MEX	ARG	JOR	ITA	GRE	TUR	FIN; Ret	GER	NZL	ESP	FRA	JPN	GBR		–	0	–	0
2009	Mitsubishi Lancer EVO IX	70	(Lithuania) Juta Racing	IRE	NOR	CYP	POR	ARG	ITA	GRE	POL; 15	FIN	AUS	ESP	GBR					–	0	–	0
2014	Mitsubishi Lancer EVO X	84	(Lithuania) Juta Racing	MON	SWE	MEX	POR	ARG	ITA	POL; 36	FIN	GER	AUS	FRA	ESP	GBR				–	0	–	0

=== Complete ERC results ===
Year	Car	No	Team	1	2	3	4	5	6	7	8	9	10	11	12	WDC	Points	TC	Points
2006	Mitsubishi Lancer EVO IX	24	(Lithuania) Juta Racing	ITA	TUR	POL; Ret	BEL	BUL	POR	CZE	GRE	FRA				–	0	–	0
2013	Mitsubishi Lancer EVO X	9/25	(Lithuania) Juta Racing	AUT	LAT; 8	ESP	POR	FRA	BEL	ROM	CZE	POL; Ret	CRO	ITA	SWI	49	11	–	11
2014	Mitsubishi Lancer EVO X	6	(Lithuania) Juta Racing	AUT	LAT; Ret	GRE	IRE	POR	BEL	EST	CZE	CYP	ROM	SWI	FRA	–	0	–	0
