= 2016 Circuit of Ireland =

Round 2 of 10 of the 2016 European Rally Championship
← Previous event	Next event →
- Host country: United Kingdom
- Rally base: Belfast
- Dates run: 8 – 9 April 2016
- Stages: 14 (20,956 km; 13,021 miles)
- Stage surface: Tarmac

Statistics
- Crews: 70 at start, 44 at finish

Overall results
- Overall winner: (Republic of Ireland) Craig Breen; DGM Sport

The 2016 Circuit of Ireland was the second round of the 2016 European Rally Championship, held in Northern Ireland between 7–8 April 2016.

The rally was won by Irish driver Craig Breen and co-driver Scott Martin, in Citroën DS3 R5 rally car.

== Results ==
Pos	No	Driver	Co-driver	Entrant	Car	Time/Retired	Points
1	1	(Republic of Ireland) Craig Breen	(United Kingdom) Scott Martin	DGM Sport	Citroën DS3 R5	1:54:16.1	38
2	3	(Poland) Kajetan Kajetanowicz	(Poland) Jaroslaw Baran	Lotos Rally Team	Ford Fiesta R5	1:54:26.7	31
3	6	(United Kingdom) Alastair Fisher	(United Kingdom) Gordon Noble		Ford Fiesta R5	1:55:12.5	23
4	39	(Republic of Ireland) Josh Moffett	(Republic of Ireland) John Rowan	Combilift Rallying	Ford Fiesta R5	1:55:56.2	19
5	16	(United Kingdom) Jonathan Greer	(United Kingdom) Kirsty Riddick	DGM Sport	Citroën DS3 R5	1:56:23.1	14
6	10	(United Kingdom) David Bogie	(United Kingdom) Kevin Rae	CA1 Sport	Škoda Fabia R5	1:57:11.7	10
7	43	(Republic of Ireland) Stephen Wright	(Republic of Ireland) James Fulton		Ford Fiesta R5	1:58:52.2	7
8	7	(United Kingdom) Tom Cave	(United Kingdom) James Morgan	Spencer Sport	Ford Fiesta R5	1:59:07.2	4
9	17	(Republic of Ireland) Joseph McGonigle	(Republic of Ireland) Ciaran Geaney		Škoda Fabia S2000	2:00:08.3	2
10	22	(Poland) Jarosław Kołtun	(Poland) Ireneusz Pleskot	C-Rally	Ford Fiesta R5	2:00:42.3	1
