= Nikolay Gryazin =

Russian rally driver

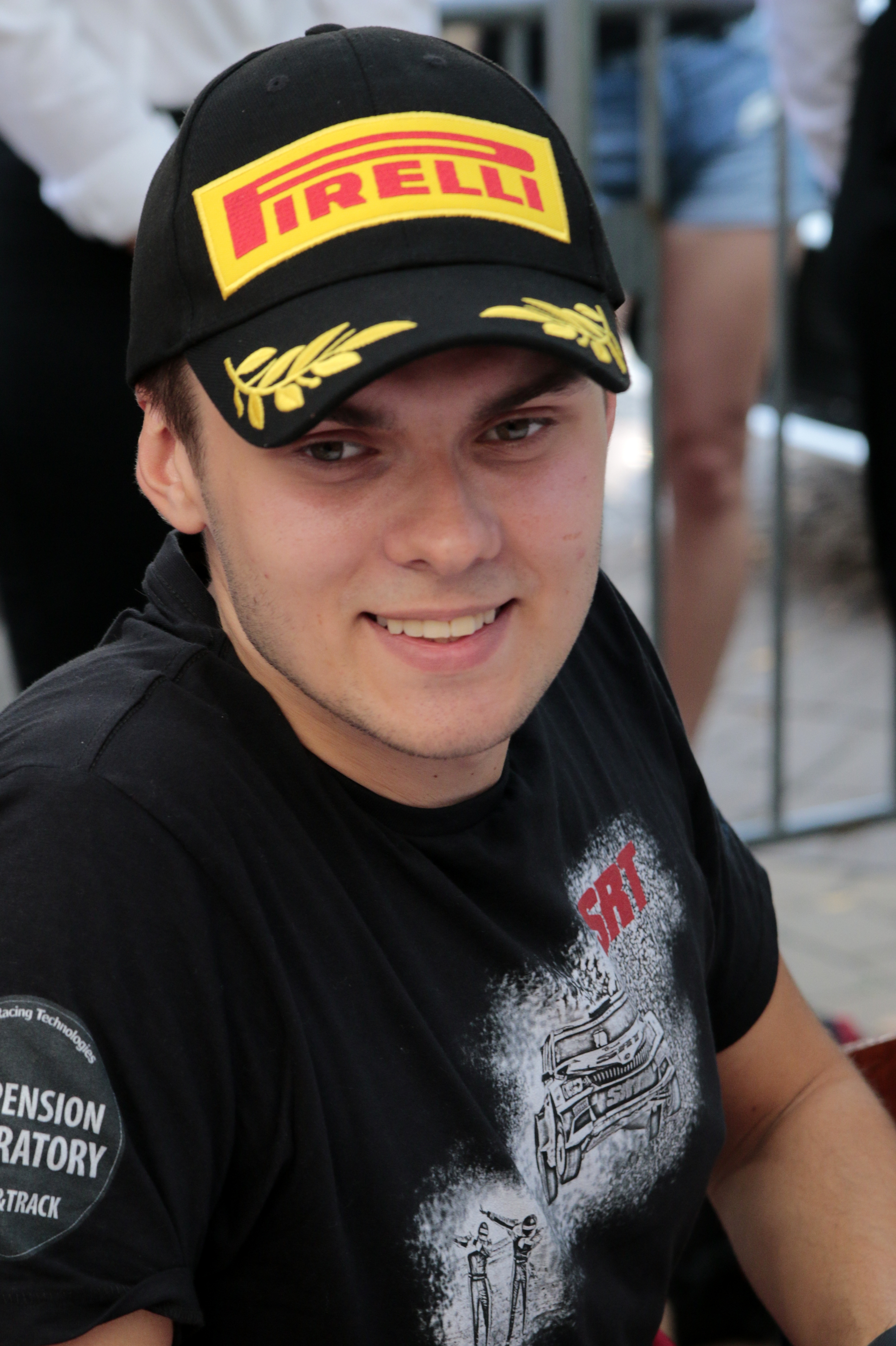
- Gryazin in 2018

Personal information
- Nationality: Russian (Note: He occasionally competed under a Latvian licence.) (2019–2020); Russian Automobile Federation (Note: Nikolay Gryazin competed as a neutral competitor hiding his Russian flag using the designation RAF (Russian Automobile Federation), as the Court of Arbitration for Sport upheld a ban on Russia competing at World Championships. The ban was implemented by the World Anti-Doping Agency in response to state-sponsored doping program of Russian athletes.) (2021–2022); FIA (2022–2023) (Note: Nikolay Gryazin competed as a neutral competitor using the FIA flag as Russian national emblems were banned by the association due to the Russian invasion of Ukraine.); Bulgaria (2024–present) (Note: In 2024, Gryazin switched to Bulgarian licence after obtaining Bulgarian citizenship.)
- Full name: Nikolay Stanislavovich Gryazin
- Born: 7 October 1997 (age 29); Moscow, Russia

World Rally Championship record
- Years active: 2019–present
- Co-driver: (Russia) /// (Kyrgyzstan) Konstantin Aleksandrov
- Teams: Hyundai, Movisport, Toksport, DG Sport Compétition, Lancia Corse HF
- Rallies: 62
- Championships: 0
- Rally wins: 0
- Podiums: 0
- Stage wins: 0
- Total points: 76
- First rally: 2019 Rally Sweden

Nikolay Stanislavovich Gryazin (Russian: Николай Станиславович Грязин, IPA: [nʲɪkɐˈɫaɪ̯ stənʲɪˈsɫavəvʲɪt͡ɕ ˈɡrʲæzʲɪn]; born 7 October 1997) is a Russian-Bulgarian rally driver currently competing under a Bulgarian License. He is the son of former rally driver Stanislav Gryazin and the younger brother of rally driver Vasiliy Gryazin.

Gryazin has four overall victories in the European Rally Championship, and he finished second in the 2018 European Rally Championship, winning the ERC Junior U28 title. In 2019, he made his debut in the World Rally Championship, achieving his first WRC-2 class victory in the 2019 Rally Finland.

Gryazin currently competes for Lancia Corse, in the World Rally Championship, driving a Lancia Ypsilon Rally2 HF Integrale in the World Rally Championship-2, the premier support category of the World Rally Championship. His current co-driver is fellow Russian Konstantin Aleksandrov.

== Background ==
A Russian driver with Latvian background, since the beginning of his rallying career, Gryazin has been a member of the junior rally program of Sports Racing Technologies.

== Career ==
=== Early years ===
With their backing, he first rose to prominence in 2016, in the junior classes of the European Rally Championship, running a full-time campaign in the ERC-3 class with an R2-spec Peugeot 208. From the start, he showed speed, but lacked enough consistency. After four rallies in which he failed to finish, he scored a class win at the Polish round in Rzeszowski and a podium at the Czech Rally Zlín. He finished the season placed fourth in the ERC-3 standings. He would also place 6th in the Latvian junior championship that year.

=== 2017–2018: ERC & Latvia ===
In 2017, Gryazin would make the step-up to four-wheel drive machinery, as he would be using the Škoda Fabia R5 for a full-time outright campaign on the European and Latvian Rally Championships, along with select regional rallies across Europe. Gryazin struggled to take off in the European Championship, only managing a best finish of fifth at the Rallye Açores, until he fought Kalle Rovanperä to take an overall win at the season-ending Rally Liepaja, the Latvian round of the ERC. He finished the ERC season seventh place, and came second in the Under-28 trophy. Back in Latvia, he managed an impressive three victories and finished runner-up in the championship. Gryazin coupled these programs with podium finishes and victories in regional rallies at Estonia, Slovenia, and Finland.

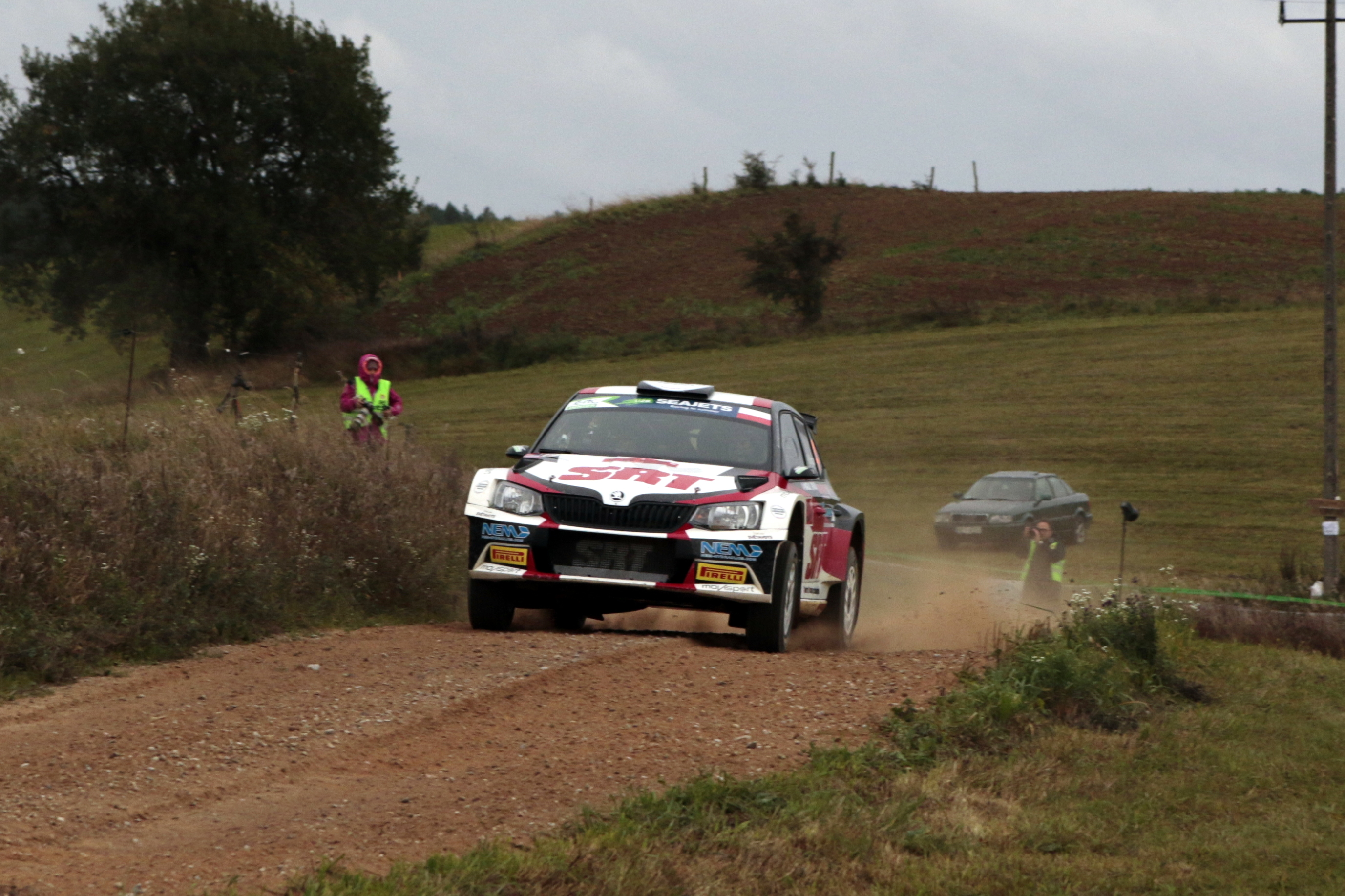
Nikolay Gryazin competing at the 2018 Rally Poland.

The year of 2018 marked a breakout year for Gryazin. In addition to continued full-season efforts in the ERC and Latvia with the Fabia, he would also tackle the Finnish championship as well. This season would prove to be very successful for Gryazin, as he would take two overall victories in the ERC, one in Poland with a hard battle between himself and Jari Huttunen, and at Rally Liepaja for the second consecutive year. These victories were obtained on the way to a runner-up finish in the 2018 ERC standings, winning the Under-28 trophy as well. Gryazin finished third in the Latvian championship with three victories, as well as taking home fourth in the Finnish Championship with one win. He took additional podiums and victories in regional rallies at Poland, Lithuania, Italy, Sweden, and Norway.

=== 2019–present: World Rally Championship-2 ===
After a big breakthrough year in 2018, it was announced that Gryazin and Sports Racing Technologies would make the step up to a full-season campaign in the World Rally Championship-2 in 2019, which would mark his first starts in the World Rally Championship. After two victories in warm-up rallies in Norway, Gryazin made his WRC debut at Rally Sweden, and he would finish 15th overall, and fifth in the WRC-2 class. In his next round at Corsica, he finished 12th overall, and took a second place WRC-2 finish, capitalizing on the attrition of the regular favorites. The rest of his 2019 season campaign was scheduled to be the remaining non-fly away events.

== Rally results ==
=== Complete WRC results ===
Year	Entrant	Car	1	2	3	4	5	6	7	8	9	10	11	12	13	14	WDC	Points
2019	Nikolay Gryazin (Note: Entry run by Sports Racing Technologies.)	Škoda Fabia R5	MON	SWE; 15	MEX	FRA; 12	ARG	CHL	POR; 13	ITA; Ret	FIN; 10	GER; 20	TUR; WD				24th	1
2019	Nikolay Gryazin	Škoda Fabia R5 Evo												GBR; 13	ESP; 23	AUS; C	24th	1
2020	Hyundai Motorsport N	Hyundai i20 R5	MON; 16	SWE; 21	MEX; 7	EST; 19	TUR	ITA; Ret	MNZ								18th	6
2021	Movisport	Volkswagen Polo GTI R5	MON; 12	ARC; 12	CRO; Ret	POR; 10	ITA; Ret	KEN	EST; Ret	BEL; 59		FIN; 36					30th	2
2021	Movisport	Ford Fiesta R5 Mk. II									GRE; 13						30th	2
2021	Movisport	Škoda Fabia Rally2 evo											ESP; 10	MNZ; 13			30th	2
2022	Toksport WRT 2	Škoda Fabia Rally2 evo	MON; 10	SWE; Ret	CRO; 10	POR; 28	ITA; 8	KEN	EST; WD	FIN; Ret	BEL; 8	GRE; 10	NZL	ESP; 13	JPN		18th	11
2023	Toksport WRT 2	Škoda Fabia Rally2 evo	MON; 10	SWE; 11	MEX; Ret	CRO; 9	POR; 30	ITA; 34	KEN	EST	FIN; 9	GRE; 47	CHL; 10	EUR; 16	JPN; 8		19th	10
2024	AEC – DG Sport Compétition	Citroën C3 Rally2	MON; 10	SWE; 19	KEN	CRO; 8	POR; 7	ITA; 33	POL; 14	LAT; 14	FIN; 9	GRE; 48	CHL; 9	EUR; 6	JPN; 7		14th	24
2025	Nikolay Gryazin	Škoda Fabia RS Rally2	MON; 9	SWE	KEN	ESP; 10	POR; 46	ITA; 8	GRE; Ret	EST; Ret	FIN; 14	PAR	CHL	EUR	JPN	SAU	15th	12
2026	Lancia Corse HF	Lancia Ypsilon Rally2 HF Integrale	MON; 13	SWE	KEN	CRO; 6	ESP; 15	POR; 11	JPN; 9	GRE	EST	FIN; 14	PAR; 11	CHL; Ret	ITA	SAU; C	17th	10

* Season still in progress.

=== Complete WRC-2 results ===
Year	Entrant	Car	1	2	3	4	5	6	7	8	9	10	11	12	13	14	WDC	Points
2019	Nikolay Gryazin	Škoda Fabia R5	MON	SWE; 5	MEX	FRA; 2	ARG	CHL	POR; 5	ITA; Ret	FIN; 1	GER; 5	TUR; WD	GBR			4th	73
2019	Nikolay Gryazin	Škoda Fabia R5 Evo													ESP; 11	AUS; C	4th	73
2020	Hyundai Motorsport N	Hyundai i20 R5	MON; 3	SWE; 6	MEX; 2	EST; 5	TUR	ITA; Ret	MNZ								5th	51
2021	Movisport	Volkswagen Polo GTI R5	MON	ARC; 3	CRO; Ret	POR; 4	ITA	KEN	EST; Ret	BEL; 2		FIN; 6	ESP	MNZ			6th	77
2021	Movisport	Ford Fiesta R5 Mk. II									GRE; 3						6th	77
2022	Toksport WRT 2	Škoda Fabia Rally2 evo	MON; 3	SWE; Ret	CRO; 4	POR	ITA; 1	KEN	EST; WD	FIN; Ret	BEL	GRE; 2	NZL	ESP; 3	JPN		5th	85
2023	Toksport WRT 2	Škoda Fabia Rally2 evo	MON; 2	SWE	MEX	CRO; 2	POR	ITA; 21	KEN	EST	FIN; 3	GRE	CHL; 5	EUR; 6	JPN; 2		4th	96
2024	AEC – DG Sport Compétition	Citroën C3 Rally2	MON; 3	SWE	KEN	CRO; 1	POR	ITA	POL; 6	LAT	FIN	GRE; 21	CHL; 2	EUR; 1	JPN; 1		3rd	116
2025	Nikolay Gryazin	Škoda Fabia RS Rally2	MON	SWE	KEN	ESP; 3	POR	ITA	GRE	EST; Ret	FIN	PAR; 3	CHL; 2	EUR; 5	JPN; 2	SAU; 2	3rd	91
2026	Lancia Corse HF	Lancia Ypsilon Rally2 HF Integrale	MON; 6	SWE	KEN	CRO; 3	ESP; 6	POR	JPN; 1	GRE	EST	FIN	PAR; 5	CHL; Ret	ITA	SAU; C	5th	66

* Season still in progress.

=== Complete European Rally Championship Results ===
Year	Entrant	Car	1	2	3	4	5	6	7	8	9	10	ERC	Points
2015	Sports Racing Technologies	Škoda Fabia R5	JAN	LVA	IRL	ACO	YPR	EST	CZE	CYP	GRC	VAL; 6	34th	10
2016	Sports Racing Technologies	Peugeot 208 R2	ESP	IRL; 20	GRC	ACO; Ret	YPR; Ret	EST; Ret	POL; 13	CZE; 29	LVA; 27		NC	0
2016	Sports Racing Technologies	Škoda Fabia R5										CYP; Ret	NC	0
2017	Sports Racing Technologies	Škoda Fabia R5	ACO; 5	ESP; 12	GRC; Ret	CYP; 33	POL; Ret	CZE; 14	ROM; 8	LVA; 1			7th	59
2018	Sports Racing Technologies	Škoda Fabia R5	ACO	ESP; 2	GRC	CYP	ROM; 27	CZE; 5	POL; 1	LVA; 1			2nd	129
2019	Sports Racing Technologies	Škoda Fabia R5	AZO	CAN	LIE	POL	RMC; Ret	CZE; Ret	CYP	HUN			NC	0
2020	Nikolay Gryazin	Hyundai i20 R5	ITA	LAT; 20	PRT	HUN	ESP						34th	1
2021	Movisport	Volkswagen Polo GTI R5	POL; Ret	LAT; 1	ITA; 21	CZE	PRT1	PRT2	HUN; 22	ESP			9th	44
