= Saintéloc Racing =

French motorsport team

(France) Saintéloc Racing
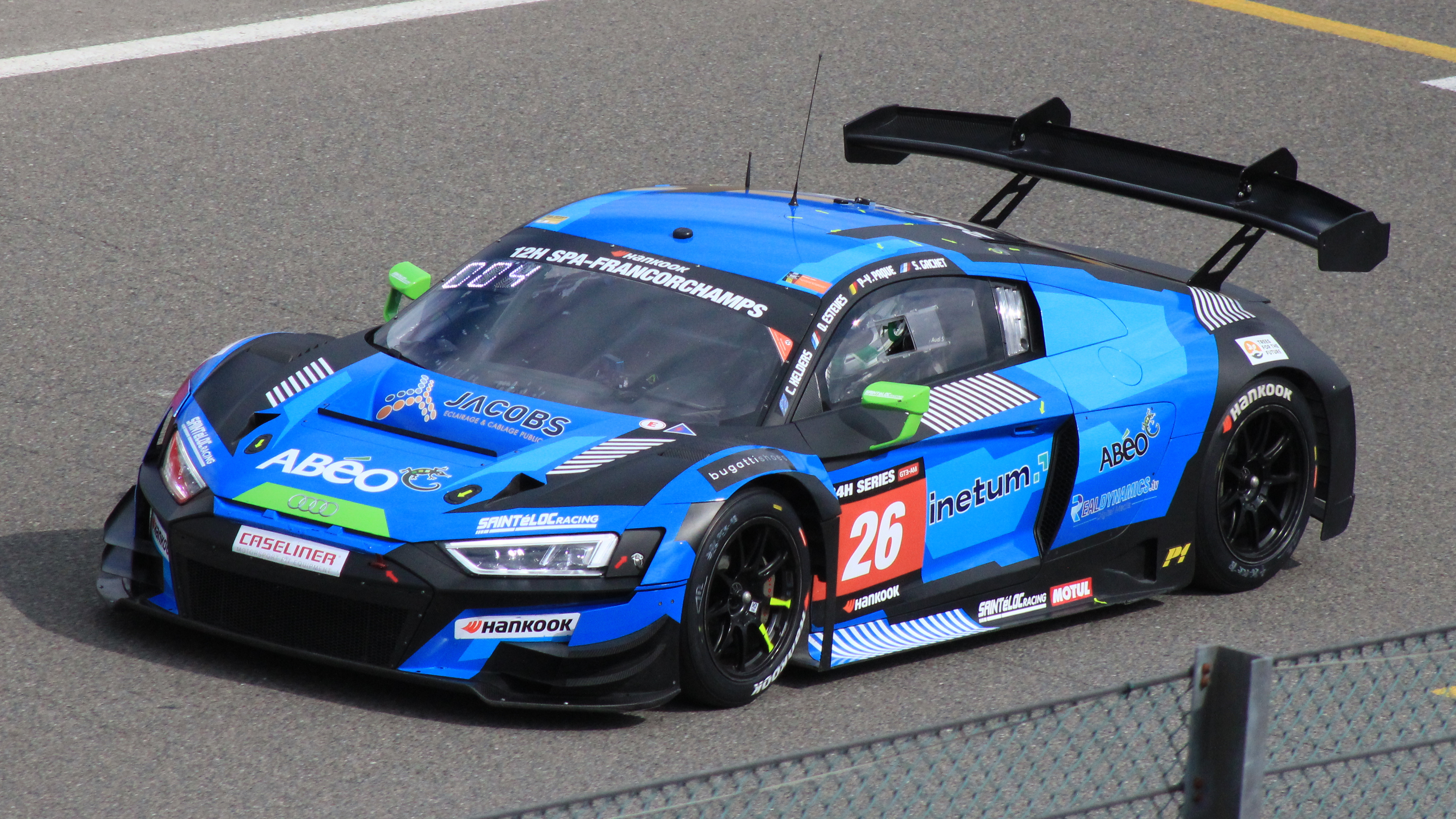
- Founded: 2004; 22 years ago
- Team principal(s): Sébastien Chetail
- Current series: World Rally Championship-2; GT World Challenge Europe Endurance Cup; GT World Challenge Europe Sprint Cup; GT4 European Series; F4 Spanish Championship; Formula 4 UAE Championship; Formula Regional European Championship
- Current drivers: (France) Eric Camilli (United States) Sean Johnston (Switzerland) Lucas Légeret (Germany) Christopher Mies (Switzerland) Patric Niederhauser (Belgium) Nicolas Baert (France) César Gazeau (France) Aurélien Panis (Belgium) Gilles Magnus (France) Erwan Bastard (Israel) Roee Meyuhas (France) Anthony Beltoise (France) Olivier Esteves (France) Gregory Faessel Curson (France) Adrien Tambay (France) Grégory Guilvert (France) Fabien Michal (Colombia) Lucas Medina (Colombia) Nicolás Baptiste (Brazil) Emerson Fittipaldi Jr. (France) Esteban Masson (France) Théophile Naël (Denmark) Theodor Jensen (France) Luciano Morano (Ukraine) Ivan Klymenko
- Drivers' Championships: F4 Spanish Championship: 2023: Théophile Naël

Saintéloc Junior Team
- Base: Saint-Etienne, France
- Team principal(s): Vincent Ducher
- Drivers: WRC-2 (France) Eric Camilli (United States) Sean Johnston
- Co-drivers: WRC-2 (France) Thibault de la Haye (United States) Alex Kihurani
- Chassis: Citroën C3 Rally2

Saintéloc Racing is a French motorsport team. It mainly operates in rallying and sports car racing series. Current series include the European Rally Championship, World Rally Championship-2 and the GT World Challenge Europe Endurance Cup. The team previously ran the Peugeot Rally Academy in the European Rally Championship after being the main Peugeot entrant in the Intercontinental Rally Challenge. They also compete in single-seaters, racing in Spanish and UAE F4, as well as the Formula Regional European Championship.

== Current series results ==
=== F4 Spanish Championship ===
Year	Car	Drivers	Races	Wins	Poles	F/Laps	Podiums	Points	D.C.	T.C.
2022	Tatuus F4-T421	(France) Théophile Naël	12	0	0	0	0	11	19th	7th
2022	Tatuus F4-T421	(Denmark) Theodor Jensen	9	0	0	0	0	0	30th	7th
2022	Tatuus F4-T421	(Switzerland) Ethan Ischer	3	0	0	0	0	0	34th	7th
2022	Tatuus F4-T421	(Thailand) Carl Bennett	3	0	0	0	0	0	NC	7th
2023	Tatuus F4-T421	(Spain) Théophile Naël	21	8	5	5	14	314	1st	4th
2023	Tatuus F4-T421	(France) Luciano Morano	21	0	0	0	0	0	28th	4th
2023	Tatuus F4-T421	(Denmark) Theodor Jensen	20	0	0	0	0	0	30th	4th
2023	Tatuus F4-T421	(United Arab Emirates) Sebastian Murray	3	0	0	0	0	0	39th	4th
2024	Tatuus F4-T421	(United Arab Emirates) Matteo Quintarelli	15	0	0	1	0	26	15th	7th
2024	Tatuus F4-T421	(Sri Lanka) Yevan David	18	0	0	0	0	12	19th	7th
2024	Tatuus F4-T421	(Austria) Oscar Wurz†	5	0	0	0	0	0	29th	7th
2024	Tatuus F4-T421	(Netherlands) Reno Francot†	6	0	0	0	0	0	33rd	7th
2024	Tatuus F4-T421	(Mexico) Lorenzo Castillo†	21	0	0	0	0	0	35th	7th
2024	Tatuus F4-T421	(Colombia) Maximiliano Restrepo	18	0	0	0	0	0	37th	7th
2024	Tatuus F4-T421	(Israel) Ariel Elkin†	6	0	0	0	0	0	NC	7th
2025	Tatuus F4-T421	(Greece) Jean-Paul Karras†	11	0	0	0	0	0	40th	13th
2025	Tatuus F4-T421	(Greece) Philippe Armand Karras†	11	0	0	0	0	0	41st	13th
2025	Tatuus F4-T421	(United States) Alex Powell	1	0	0	0	0	0	42nd	13th

† Shared results with other teams

=== Formula Regional European Championship ===
Year	Car	Drivers	Races	Wins	Poles	F/Laps	Podiums	Points	D.C.	T.C.
2023	Tatuus F3 T-318	(France) Esteban Masson	12	0	0	0	1	39	16th	9th
2023	Tatuus F3 T-318	(Brazil) Emerson Fittipaldi Jr.	20	0	0	0	0	4	24th	9th
2023	Tatuus F3 T-318	(Colombia) Lucas Medina	12	0	0	0	0	0	35th	9th
2023	Tatuus F3 T-318	(France) Pierre-Louis Chovet	2	0	0	0	0	0	NC	9th
2023	Tatuus F3 T-318	(Poland) Tymek Kucharczyk	2	0	0	0	0	0	NC	9th
2024	Tatuus F3 T-318	(France) Théophile Naël	20	1	1	0	1	81	9th	5th
2024	Tatuus F3 T-318	(France) Enzo Peugeot	20	0	0	0	0	52	15th	5th
2024	Tatuus F3 T-318	(Italy) Matteo de Palo	20	0	0	0	0	29	17th	5th
2025	Tatuus F3 T-318	(Italy) Nikita Bedrin	20	0	0	0	2	72	11th	6th
2025	Tatuus F3 T-318	(Netherlands) Tim Gerhards	16	0	0	0	0	0	29th	6th
2025	Tatuus F3 T-318	(Ukraine) Yaroslav Veselaho	17	0	0	0	0	0	34th	6th
2025	Tatuus F3 T-318	(Netherlands) Maya Weug	2	0	0	0	0	0	39th	6th
2025	Tatuus F3 T-318	(United States) James Egozi†	4	0	0	0	0	0	NC	6th

† Egozi drove for RPM in round 9.

=== Eurocup-3 ===
Year	Car	Drivers	Races	Wins	Poles	F/Laps	Podiums	Points	D.C.	T.C.
2023	Tatuus F3 T-318	(Switzerland) Dario Cabanelas	8	0	0	0	0	5	18th	6th
2024	Tatuus F3 T-318	(Kazakhstan) Alexander Abkhazava	16	1	0	0	2	76	9th	3rd
2024	Tatuus F3 T-318	(Mexico) José Garfias	12	0	0	1	0	52	10th	3rd
2024	Tatuus F3 T-318	(Spain) Daniel Nogales†	16	0	0	1	0	23	15th	3rd
2024	Tatuus F3 T-318	(Sri Lanka) Yevan David	2	0	0	0	0	7	19th	3rd
2024	Tatuus F3 T-318	(Mexico) Diego de la Torre	16	0	0	0	0	0	24th	3rd
2024	Tatuus F3 T-318	(United Kingdom) Finley Green	3	0	0	0	0	0	32nd	3rd
2024	Tatuus F3 T-318	(United Kingdom) James Hedley	2	0	0	0	0	0	NC	3rd
2024	Tatuus F3 T-318	(United Arab Emirates) Matteo Quintarelli	2	0	0	0	0	0	NC	3rd
2025	Tatuus F3 T-318	(United States) Garrett Berry	18	1	0	0	1	43	13th	6th
2025	Tatuus F3 T-318	(Mexico) Lorenzo Castillo	16	0	0	0	0	0	29th	6th
2025	Tatuus F3 T-318	(Denmark) Theodor Jensen	3	0	0	0	0	0	36th	6th

† Nogales drove for Drivex until round 5.

=== Formula Regional Middle East Championship ===
Year	Car	Drivers	Races	Wins	Poles	F/Laps	Podiums	Points	D.C.	T.C.
2024	Tatuus F3 T-318	(France) Théophile Naël	15	1	0	0	3	75	11th	5th
2024	Tatuus F3 T-318	(Italy) Matteo De Palo	6	0	0	0	0	8	18th	5th
2024	Tatuus F3 T-318	(France) Enzo Peugeot	6	0	0	0	0	0	25th	5th
2024	Tatuus F3 T-318	(Mexico) José Garfias	9	0	0	0	0	0	27th	5th
2024	Tatuus F3 T-318	(Brazil) Pedro Clerot	6	0	0	0	0	0	28th	5th
2024	Tatuus F3 T-318	(Denmark) Noah Strømsted	3	0	0	0	0	0	29th	5th
2025	Tatuus F3 T-318	(France) Théophile Naël	9	0	0	1	3	125	7th	4th
2025	Tatuus F3 T-318	(Italy) Nikita Bedrin	6	1	0	2	4	92	11th	4th
2025	Tatuus F3 T-318	(Ukraine) Yaroslav Veselaho	15	0	0	0	0	0	26th	4th
2025	Tatuus F3 T-318	(Mexico) Lorenzo Castillo	6	0	0	0	0	0	31st	4th
2025	Tatuus F3 T-318	(Germany) Jakob Bergmeister	3	0	0	0	0	0	35th	4th

== Former series results ==
=== Formula 4 UAE Championship ===
Year	Car	Drivers	Races	Wins	Poles	F/Laps	Podiums	Points	D.C.	T.C.
2023	Tatuus F4-T421	(France) Théophile Naël	15	0	0	1	0	49	11th	10th
2023	Tatuus F4-T421	(Denmark) Theodor Jensen	15	0	0	0	0	0	37th	10th
2023	Tatuus F4-T421	(France) Luciano Morano	15	0	0	0	0	0	45th	10th
2024	Tatuus F4-T421	(United Arab Emirates) Matteo Quintarelli	15	0	0	0	0	42	13th	8th
2024	Tatuus F4-T421	(France) Jules Caranta†	15	0	0	0	0	37	15th	8th
2024	Tatuus F4-T421	(France) Raphaël Narac†	15	0	0	0	0	4	23rd	8th
2024	Tatuus F4-T421	(Sri Lanka) Yevan David	15	0	0	0	0	0	26th	8th
2024	Tatuus F4-T421	(Colombia) Maximiliano Restrepo	15	0	0	0	0	0	36th	8th
2024	Tatuus F4-T421	(Brazil) Aurelia Nobels	6	0	0	0	0	0	38th	8th

† Shared results with R-ace GP

== Rally Results ==
=== WRC-2 results ===
Year	Entrant	Car	Driver	1	2	3	4	5	6	7	8	9	10	11	12	13	Drivers	Points	Teams	Points
2015	(France) Saintéloc Junior Team	Peugeot 208 T16 R5	(Republic of Ireland) Craig Breen	MON; 2	SWE	MEX	ARG	POR; Ret	ITA	POL	FIN; Ret	GER; 5	AUS	FRA; 4	ESP; Ret	GBR; 3	9th	55	7th	63
2021	(France) Saintéloc Junior Team	Citroën C3 Rally2	(United States) Sean Johnston	MON; 5	ARC; 7	CRO	POR	ITA; Ret	KEN	EST; Ret	BEL	GRE; 6	FIN	ESP	MNZ		12th*	25*	5th*	27*
2021	(France) Saintéloc Junior Team	Citroën C3 Rally2	(Canada) Crazy Leo	MON	ARC	CRO	POR	ITA	KEN	EST	BEL	GRE; 7	FIN	ESP	MNZ		18th*	6*	5th*	27*
2022	(France) Saintéloc Junior Team	Citroën C3 Rally2	(France) Eric Camilli	MON; Ret	SWE	CRO; 7	POR	ITA	KEN	EST	FIN	BEL	GRE	NZL	ESP	JPN	16th*	6*	4th*	40*
2022	(France) Saintéloc Junior Team	Citroën C3 Rally2	(United States) Sean Johnston	MON; 4	SWE	CRO; 11	POR	ITA	KEN	EST	FIN	BEL	GRE	NZL	ESP	JPN	11th*	12*	4th*	40*

* Season still in progress.

=== IRC results ===
Year	Car	Entrant	Driver	1	2	3	4	5	6	7	8	9	10	11	12	13	DC	Points
2012	Peugeot 207 S2000	(France) Saintéloc Racing	(Republic of Ireland) Craig Breen	AZO	CAN	IRL; 5	COR; 6	ITA; Ret	YPR	SMR	ROM	ZLI	YAL	SLI	SAN; 6	CYP	14th	26
2012	Peugeot 207 S2000	(France) Saintéloc Racing	(France) Jean-Matthieu Leandri	AZO	CAN	IRL	COR; 10	ITA	YPR	SMR	ROM	ZLI	YAL	SLI	SAN	CYP	74th	1
2012	Peugeot 207 S2000	(France) Saintéloc Racing	(Switzerland) Florian Gonon	AZO	CAN	IRL	COR	ITA	YPR; Ret	SMR	ROM	ZLI; 24	YAL	SLI	SAN	CYP	-	0
2012	Peugeot 207 S2000	(France) Saintéloc Racing	(Switzerland) Michael Burri	AZO	CAN	IRL	COR	ITA	YPR	SMR	ROM; Ret	ZLI	YAL	SLI	SAN	CYP	-	0
2012	Peugeot 207 S2000	(France) Saintéloc Racing	(France) Mathieu Arzeno	AZO	CAN	IRL; 4	COR; 11	ITA			ROM; Ret	ZLI	YAL	SLI	SAN	CYP	33rd	12
2012	Citroën DS3 R3T	(France) Saintéloc Racing	(France) Mathieu Arzeno						YPR; Ret	SMR							33rd	12

=== ERC results ===
Year	Entrant	Car	Driver	1	2	3	4	5	6	7	8	9	10	11	12	13	ERC	Points	Teams	Points
2013	(France) Saintéloc Peugeot Rally Academy	Peugeot 207 S2000	(Republic of Ireland) Craig Breen	JÄN	LIE; 2	CAN; 2											3rd	145	–	–
2013	(France) Peugeot Rally Academy	Peugeot 207 S2000	(Republic of Ireland) Craig Breen				AZO; 2	COR; 4	YPR; 3	SMR	ROM	CZE	POL; 7	CRO	SAN; Ret	VAL; 3	3rd	145	–	–
2013	(France) Saintéloc Peugeot Rally Academy	Peugeot 207 S2000	(France) Jérémi Ancian	JÄN	LIE	CAN; Ret											12th	37	–	–
2013	(France) Peugeot Rally Academy	Peugeot 207 S2000	(France) Jérémi Ancian				AZO; 5	COR; Ret	YPR	SMR	ROM	CZE	POL; 22	CRO	SAN; Ret	VAL; 4	12th	37	–	–
2013	(France) Saintéloc Racing	Peugeot 207 S2000	(France) Jean-Matthieu Leandri	JÄN	LIE	CAN; 8		COR; 8	YPR; Ret	SMR	ROM	CZE			SAN; Ret	VAL	55th	8	–	–
2013	(France) Saintéloc Racing	Peugeot 208 VTi R2	(France) Jean-Matthieu Leandri				AZO; Ret						POL; Ret	CRO			55th	8	–	–
2013	(France) Saintéloc Peugeot Rally Academy	Peugeot 208 VTi R2	(France) Stéphane Lefebvre	JÄN	LIE; 19	CAN											-	0	–	–
2013	(France) Peugeot Rally Academy	Peugeot 208 VTi R2	(France) Stéphane Lefebvre				AZO; 16	COR	YPR	SMR	ROM	CZE	POL; Ret	CRO	SAN	VAL; Ret	-	0	–	–
2014	(France) Peugeot Rally Academy	Peugeot 207 S2000	(Republic of Ireland) Craig Breen	JÄN	LIE; 3												3rd	104	–	–
2014	(France) Peugeot Rally Academy	Peugeot 208 T16 R5	(Republic of Ireland) Craig Breen			GRE; 1	IRE; Ret	AZO; Ret	YPR; Ret	EST	CZE; Ret	CYP; Ret	ROM	VAL; 2	COR; Ret		3rd	104	–	–
2014	(France) Peugeot Rally Academy	Peugeot 208 T16 R5	(Netherlands) Kevin Abbring	JÄN	LIE	GRE; Ret	IRE; Ret	AZO; 2	YPR; Ret	EST	CZE; Ret	CYP	ROM	VAL; Ret	COR; 3		6th	63	–	–
2014	(France) Saintéloc Junior Team	Peugeot 208 T16 R5	(Estonia) Siim Plangi	JÄN	LIE	GRE	IRE	AZO	YPR	EST; Ret	CZE	CYP	ROM	VAL	COR		73rd	2	–	–
2015	(France) Peugeot Rally Academy	Peugeot 208 T16 R5	(Republic of Ireland) Craig Breen	JÄN; Ret	LIE; 1	IRE; 1	AZO; 1	YPR; Ret	EST; Ret	CZE; 7	CYP	GRE; 2	VAL; 2				2nd	185	–	–
2015	(France) Peugeot Rally Academy	Peugeot 208 T16 R5	(France) Charles Martin	JÄN	LIE	IRE; 5	AZO; 10	YPR	EST	CZE; Ret	CYP	GRE; Ret	VAL				25th	17	–	–
2015	(France) Peugeot Rally Academy	Peugeot 208 T16 R5	(France) Stéphane Lefebvre	JÄN	LIE	IRE	AZO	YPR; 5	EST	CZE	CYP	GRE	VAL				24th	18	–	–
2015	(France) Saintéloc Junior Team	Peugeot 208 T16 R5	(Estonia) Timmu Kõrge	JÄN	LIE	IRE	AZO	YPR	EST; 5	CZE	CYP	GRE	VAL				32nd	11	–	–
2015	(France) Saintéloc Junior Team	Peugeot 208 T16 R5	(Sweden) Emil Bergkvist	JÄN	LIE	IRE	AZO	YPR	EST	CZE	CYP	GRE	VAL; 4				11th	32	–	–
2016	(France) Saintéloc Junior Team	Peugeot 208 R2	(United Kingdom) Catie Munnings	ESP	IRL	GRC	ACO	YPR; 59	EST	POL	CZE	LVA	CYP				–	–	–	–
2017	(France) Peugeot Rally Academy	Peugeot 208 T16 R5	(Spain) José Antonio Suárez	ACO; Ret	ESP; 16	GRC	CYP	POL; 6	CZE; 15	ROM; 27	LVA; 4						11th	37	8th	72
2017	(France) Peugeot Rally Academy	Peugeot 208 T16 R5	(Spain) Pepe López	ACO; 4	ESP; 6	GRC	CYP	POL; Ret	CZE; 20	ROM; Ret	LVA; Ret						13th	30	8th	72
2017	(France) Saintéloc Junior Team	Peugeot 208 R2	(United Kingdom) Catie Munnings	ACO; Ret	ESP; 68	GRC	CYP	POL; Ret	CZE; 56	ROM; 25	LVA						–	–	26th	9
2018	(France) Peugeot Rally Academy	Peugeot 208 T16 R5	(France) Laurent Pellier	AZO	CAN; 31	ACR; 5		RMC; Ret	CZE; 10	POL; 20	LIE; Ret						16th	24	22nd	16
2018	(France) Saintéloc Junior Team	Peugeot 208 R2	(France) Laurent Pellier				CYP; 12										16th	24	2nd	156
2018	(France) Saintéloc Junior Team	Peugeot 208 R2	(Austria) Simon Wagner	AZO; Ret	CAN; 20	ACR	CYP	RMC; Ret	CZE; 16	POL	LIE						–	–	2nd	156
2018	(France) Saintéloc Junior Team	Peugeot 208 R2	(United Kingdom) Catie Munnings	AZO; 28	CAN; 28	ACR	CYP; 22	RMC; 23	CZE; 24	POL; 19	LIE; 14						–	–	2nd	156
2018	(France) Saintéloc Junior Team	Peugeot 208 R2	(Finland) Miika Hokkanen	AZO	CAN; 24	ACR	CYP	RMC; Ret	CZE; Ret	POL; 15	LIE; 11						–	–	2nd	156
2019	(France) Saintéloc Junior Team	Citroën C3 R5	(Russia) Alexey Lukyanuk	PRT; Ret	ESP; Ret	LAT; 2	POL; 1	ITA; 4	CZE; 15	CYP; Ret	HUN; 2						2nd	132	1st	168
2019	(France) Saintéloc Junior Team	Citroën C3 R5	(United States) Sean Johnston								HUN; 7						32nd	7	1st	168
2019	(France) Saintéloc Junior Team	Peugeot 208 R2	(United States) Sean Johnston	PRT; 21	ESP; 28	LAT; 28	POL; 22	ITA	CZE; 22	CYP							32nd	7	1st	168
2019	(France) Saintéloc Junior Team	Peugeot 208 R2	(Norway) Sindre Furuseth	PRT; 14	ESP; Ret	LAT; 20	POL; 13	ITA; Ret	CZE; 12	CYP	HUN						–	–	1st	168
2019	(France) Saintéloc Junior Team	Peugeot 208 R2	(Sweden) Adam Westlund	PRT	ESP	LAT	POL; 15	ITA	CZE	CYP	HUN						–	–	1st	168
2019	(France) Saintéloc Junior Team	Peugeot 208 R2	(Bulgaria) Ekaterina Stratieva	PRT	ESP	LAT	POL	ITA	CZE	CYP; 19	HUN; 12						–	–	1st	168
2019	(France) Peugeot Rally Academy	Peugeot 208 R2	(United Kingdom) Catie Munnings	PRT; Ret	ESP; Ret	LAT; 33	POL	ITA; 30	CZE; WD	CYP	HUN						–	–	7th	90
2019	(France) Peugeot Rally Academy	Peugeot 208 R2	(France) Yohan Rossel	PRT; 18	ESP; 20	LAT; 25	POL	ITA	CZE; 18	CYP	HUN						–	–	7th	90
2019	(France) Peugeot Rally Academy	Peugeot 208 R2	(Spain) Efrén Llarena	PRT	ESP	LAT	POL	ITA	CZE	CYP; 14	HUN						–	–	7th	90
2020	(France) Saintéloc Junior Team	Citroën C3 R5	(Russia) Alexey Lukyanuk	ITA; 1	LAT; 2	PRT; 1	HUN; 13	ESP; 7									1st	121	2nd	183
2020	(France) Saintéloc Junior Team	Citroën C3 R5	(Germany) Marijan Griebel	ITA; 15	LAT	PRT; 10	HUN; 9	ESP; 13									20th	20	2nd	183
2020	(France) Saintéloc Junior Team	Citroën C3 R5	(United States) Sean Johnston	ITA	LAT; 9	PRT	HUN	ESP									25th	10	2nd	183
2021	(France) Saintéloc Junior Team	Citroën C3 Rally2	(Russia) Alexey Lukyanuk	POL; 1	LAT; 3	ITA; Ret	CZE; WD	PRT1; Ret	PRT2; 2	HUN	ESP; 1						4th	135	6th	143
2021	(France) Saintéloc Junior Team	Citroën C3 Rally2	(Estonia) Roland Poom	POL; 15	LAT	ITA	CZE	PRT1	PRT2	HUN	ESP						66th	1	6th	143

== Timeline ==
Current series
GT World Challenge Europe Endurance Cup	2012–present
French GT4 Cup	2014, 2017–present
Asian Le Mans Series	2016–2019, 2023–present
GT World Challenge Europe Sprint Cup	2016–present
24H Series	2019–2020, 2022–present
Middle East Trophy	2022–present
International GT Open	2024–present
Italian F4 Championship	2026–present
GT3 Revival Series	2026–present
Former series
FIA GT3 European Championship	2010–2011
Intercontinental Rally Challenge	2012
World Touring Car Championship	2013
World Rally Championship-3	2013, 2016, 2021
European Rally Championship	2013–2021
Porsche Carrera Cup Italy	2015
World Rally Championship-2	2015, 2017, 2019, 2021–2022
GT Sports Club	2015–2016
Andros Trophy	2015–2024
Intercontinental GT Challenge	2016–2022
TCR Asia Series	2017
World Touring Car Cup	2018–2019
GT4 South European Series	2019
World Rally Championship	2020
European Le Mans Series	2021
GT4 European Series	2021–2023
F4 Spanish Championship	2022–2025
Formula 4 UAE Championship	2023–2024
Eurocup-3	2023–2025
Formula Regional European Championship	2023–2025
Formula Regional Middle East Championship	2024–2025
