= 2017 Rallye Açores =

Round 1 of the 2017 European Rally Championship
Next event →
- Host country: Portugal
- Rally base: Ponta Delgada
- Dates run: March 30 – April 1
- Stages: 16 (210.20 km; 130.61 miles)
- Stage surface: Gravel

Statistics
- Crews: 60 at start, 36 at finish

Overall results
- Overall winner: (Portugal) Bruno Magalhães (Portugal) Hugo Magalhães

The 2017 Rallye Açores was 1st round of 2017 European Rally Championship, it was won by local driver Bruno Magalhães with Škoda Fabia R5.

== Results ==
Pos.	Driver	Co-driver	Car	Time	Difference	Points
1.	(Portugal) Bruno Magalhães	(Portugal) Hugo Magalhães	Škoda Fabia R5	2:37:04,3		25^{+13}
2.	(Germany) Marijan Griebel	(Germany) Stefan Kopczyk	Škoda Fabia R5	2:38:38,7	+1:34,4	18^{+8}
3.	(Republic of Ireland) Josh Moffett	(Republic of Ireland) James Fulton	Ford Fiesta R5	2:41:55,2	+4:50,9	15^{+5}
4.	(Spain) Pepe López	(Spain) Borja Rozada	Peugeot 208 T16	2:43:10,2	+6:05,9	12^{+4}
5.	(Russia) Nikolay Gryazin	(Russia) Yaroslav Fedorov	Škoda Fabia R5	2:43:15,2	+6:10,9	10^{+4}
6.	(Portugal) Pedro Meireles	(Portugal) Mário Castro	Škoda Fabia R5	2:44:34,0	+7:29,7	8^{+1}
7.	(Latvia) Ralfs Sirmacis	(Latvia) Arturs Šimins	Škoda Fabia R5	2:44:38,1	+7:33,8	6^{+2}
8.	(Portugal) Joan Barros	(Portugal) Jorge Henriques	Ford Fiesta R5	2:46:10,3	+9:06,0	4
9.	(Portugal) Carlos Vieira	(Portugal) Jorge Eduardo Carvalho	Citroën DS3 R5	2:46:23,0	+9:18,7	2
10.	(Portugal) Miguel Barbosa	(Portugal) Miguel Ramalho	Škoda Fabia R5	2:48:40,7	+11:36,4	1

== Special stages ==
Leg	Stage	Time	Name	Length	Winner	Time	Avg. spd.	Rally leader
0 (30 March)	QS	8:00	Remédios (Shakedown)	3.12 km	(Poland) Kajetan Kajetanowicz	1:54.2	-	Out of competition
1 (30 March)	SS1	15:21	Lagoa Stage	2.14 km	(Russia) Alexey Lukyanuk	1:34,7	81.4 km/h	(Russia) Alexey Lukyanuk
1 (30 March)	SS2	15:40	Solucoes M	7.08 km	(Portugal) Ricardo Moura	3:34,2	118.9 km/h	(Portugal) Ricardo Moura
1 (30 March)	SS3	16:25	Vila Franca - São Brás 1	13.47 km	(Russia) Alexey Lukyanuk	10:07,7	79.8 km/h	(Russia) Alexey Lukyanuk
1 (30 March)	SS4	17:22	SSS Grupo Marques 1	3.95 km	(Poland) Kajetan Kajetanowicz	2:25,6	69.2 km/h	(Poland) Kajetan Kajetanowicz
1 (31 March)	SS5	10:43	Pico da Pedra Golfe 1	7.02 km	(Russia) Alexey Lukyanuk	4:26,4	94.9 km/h	(Russia) Alexey Lukyanuk
1 (31 March)	SS6	11:22	Feteiras Meo 1	7.46 km	(Russia) Alexey Lukyanuk	5:35,6	80.0 km/h	(Russia) Alexey Lukyanuk
1 (31 March)	SS7	11:53	Sete Cidades 1	25.62 km	(Russia) Alexey Lukyanuk	17:36,5	87.3 km/h	(Russia) Alexey Lukyanuk
1 (31 March)	SS8	14:43	Pico da Pedra Golfe 2	7.02 km	(Russia) Nikolay Gryazin	4:25,4	95.2 km/h	(Russia) Alexey Lukyanuk
1 (31 March)	SS9	15:22	Feteiras Meo 2	7.46 km	(Portugal) Bruno Magalhães	5:27,4	82.0 km/h	(Russia) Alexey Lukyanuk
1 (31 March)	SS10	15:53	Sete Cidades 2	25.62 km	(Portugal) Bruno Magalhães	17:24,2	88.3 km/h	(Russia) Alexey Lukyanuk
2 (1 April)	SS11	10:08	Graminhais 1	21.01 km	(Russia) Alexey Lukyanuk	15:38,8	80.6 km/h	(Russia) Alexey Lukyanuk
2 (1 April)	SS12	10:58	Tronqueira 1	21.96 km	(Germany) Marijan Griebel	18:28,4	71.3 km/h	(Portugal) Bruno Magalhães
2 (1 April)	SS13	12:34	SSS Grupo Marques 2	3.95 km	(Poland) Kajetan Kajetanowicz	3:26,5	68.9 km/h	(Portugal) Bruno Magalhães
2 (1 April)	SS14	15:03	Vila Franca - São Brás 2	13.47 km	(Poland) Kajetan Kajetanowicz	10:26,2	77.4 km/h	(Portugal) Bruno Magalhães
2 (1 April)	SS15	15:58	Graminhais 2	21.01 km	(Poland) Kajetan Kajetanowicz	15:39,2	80.5 km/h	(Portugal) Bruno Magalhães
2 (1 April)	SS16	16:48	Tronqueira 2	21.96 km	(Portugal) Bruno Magalhães	18:25,1	71.5 km/h	(Portugal) Bruno Magalhães
