= 2015 Rally Estonia =

Round of European Rally Championship, held in Estonia

2015 Rally Estonia: 6. auto24 Rally Estonia 2015
Round 6 of 10 of the 2015 European Rally Championship
← Previous event	Next event →
- Host country: Estonia
- Rally base: Otepää
- Dates run: 17 – 19 July 2015
- Start location: Tartu
- Finish location: Alaküla
- Stages: 16 (202.86 km; 126.05 miles)
- Stage surface: Gravel

Statistics
- Crews: 56 at start, 35 at finish

Overall results
- Overall winner: (Russia) Alexey Lukyanuk (Russia) Alexey Arnautov (Ukraine) Chervonenko Racing; 1:32:25.4

The auto24 Rally Estonia 2015 was the sixth running of the Rally Estonia and also the sixth round of the 2015 European Rally Championship season. The event was won by Alexey Lukyanuk & Alexey Arnautov who won 8 stages out of 16.

== Classification ==
Icon	Cup
ERC-2	ERC-2
ERC-3	ERC-3
J	ERC Junior

=== Event standings ===
Pos.		No.	Driver	Co-driver	Team	Car	Cup	Time	Difference	Points	
Event	Class	No.	Driver	Co-driver	Team	Car	Cup	Time	Difference	Class	Bonus
Overall classification
1		15	(Russia) Alexey Lukyanuk	(Russia) Alexey Arnautov	(Ukraine) Chervonenko Racing	Mitsubishi Lancer Evo X	ERC-2	1:32:25.4	0.0	25	14
2		2	(Poland) Kajetan Kajetanowicz	(Poland) Jarosław Baran	(Poland) Lotos Rally Team	Ford Fiesta R5		1:32:38.1	+12.7	18	12
3		17	(Estonia) Rainer Aus	(Estonia) Simo Koskinen	(Estonia) LEDrent Rally Team	Mitsubishi Lancer Evo IX	ERC-2	1:33:32.4	+1:07.0	15	9
4		16	(Estonia) Siim Plangi	(Estonia) Marek Sarapuu	(Latvia) Autostils Rally Technica	Mitsubishi Lancer Evo X	ERC-2	1:34:32.3	+2:06.9	12	3
5		5	(Estonia) Timmu Kõrge	(Estonia) Erki Pints	(France) Peugeot Rally Academy	Peugeot 208 T16 R5		1:34:49.1	+2:23.7	10	1
6		9	(Estonia) Raul Jeets	(Estonia) Andrus Toom	(Estonia) MM Motorsport	Ford Fiesta R5		1:36:01.6	+3:36.2	8	2
7		20	(Lithuania) Dominykas Butvilas	(Poland) Przemysław Mazur	Subaru Poland Rally Team	Subaru Impreza WRX STI	ERC-2	1:37:16.8	+4:51.4	6	
8		12	(Poland) Jarosław Kołtun	(Poland) Ireneusz Pleskot	(Poland) C-Rally	Ford Fiesta R5		1:37:46.2	+5:20.8	4	
9		21	(Hungary) Dávid Botka	(Hungary) Péter Mihalik	(Hungary) Botka Rally Team	Mitsubishi Lancer Evo IX	ERC-2	1:40:01.5	+7:36.1	2	
10		26	(Latvia) Ralfs Sirmacis	(Latvia) Artūrs Šimins	(Latvia) Sports Racing Technologies	Peugeot 208 R2	ERC-3 J	1:40:27.0	+8:01.6	1	
ERC-3 Cup / ERC Junior Cup standings
10	1	26	(Latvia) Ralfs Sirmacis	(Latvia) Artūrs Šimins	(Latvia) Sports Racing Technologies	Peugeot 208 R2	ERC-3 J	1:40:27.0	0.0	25	
11	2	23	(Sweden) Emil Bergkvist	(Sweden) Joakim Sjöberg	(Germany) ADAC Opel Rallye Junior Team	Opel Adam R2	ERC-3 J	1:40:58.8	+31.8	18	
12	3	29	(Estonia) Miko-Ove Niinemäe	(Estonia) Martin Valter	(Estonia) Cueks Racing	Peugeot 208 R2	ERC-3 J	1:41:01.2	+34.2	15	

=== Special stages ===
Date	No.	Stage name	Distance	Winners	Car	Time	Rally leaders
17 July	SS1	SSS Tartu	1.33 km	Lukyanuk / Arnautov	Mitsubishi Lancer Evo X	1:06.7	Lukyanuk / Arnautov
18 July	SS2	Arula 1	8.76 km	Kangur / Sikk	Ford Fiesta R5	4:10.4	Kruuda / Järveoja
18 July	SS3	Urvaste 1	14.82 km	Lukyanuk / Arnautov	Mitsubishi Lancer Evo X	6:23.2	Lukyanuk / Arnautov
18 July	SS4	Arula 2	8.76 km	Kruuda / Järveoja	Citroën DS3 R5	4:08.5	Kruuda / Järveoja
18 July	SS5	Urvaste 2	14.82 km	Kajetanowicz / Baran	Ford Fiesta R5	6:16.9	Lukyanuk / Arnautov
18 July	SS6	Raiga 1	9.19 km	Lukyanuk / Arnautov	Mitsubishi Lancer Evo X	4:18.2	Kajetanowicz / Baran
18 July	SS7	Ristimäe 1	20.65 km	Lukyanuk / Arnautov	Mitsubishi Lancer Evo X	10:09.6	Kajetanowicz / Baran
18 July	SS8	Ristimäe 2	34.91 km	Lukyanuk / Arnautov	Mitsubishi Lancer Evo X	16:33.8	Lukyanuk / Arnautov
18 July	SS9	Raiga 2	11.83 km	Lukyanuk / Arnautov	Mitsubishi Lancer Evo X	6:21.4	Lukyanuk / Arnautov
18 July	SS10	SSS Elva	1.55 km	Jeets / Toom	Ford Fiesta R5	1:21.0	Lukyanuk / Arnautov
19 July	SS11	Vissi 1	13.32 km	Kajetanowicz / Baran	Ford Fiesta R5	6:14.1	Lukyanuk / Arnautov
19 July	SS12	Sulaoja 1	7.11 km	Lukyanuk / Arnautov	Mitsubishi Lancer Evo X	3:26.4	Lukyanuk / Arnautov
19 July	SS13	Alaküla 1	11.48 km	Lukyanuk / Arnautov	Mitsubishi Lancer Evo X	6:01.2	Lukyanuk / Arnautov
19 July	SS14	Vissi 2	13.32 km	Kangur / Sikk	Ford Fiesta R5	6:07.4	Lukyanuk / Arnautov
19 July	SS15	Sulaoja 2	7.11 km	Kajetanowicz / Baran	Ford Fiesta R5	3:24.5	Lukyanuk / Arnautov
19 July	SS16	Alaküla 2	11.48 km	Kangur / Sikk	Ford Fiesta R5	5:59.1	Lukyanuk / Arnautov
