= 2017 European Rally Championship =

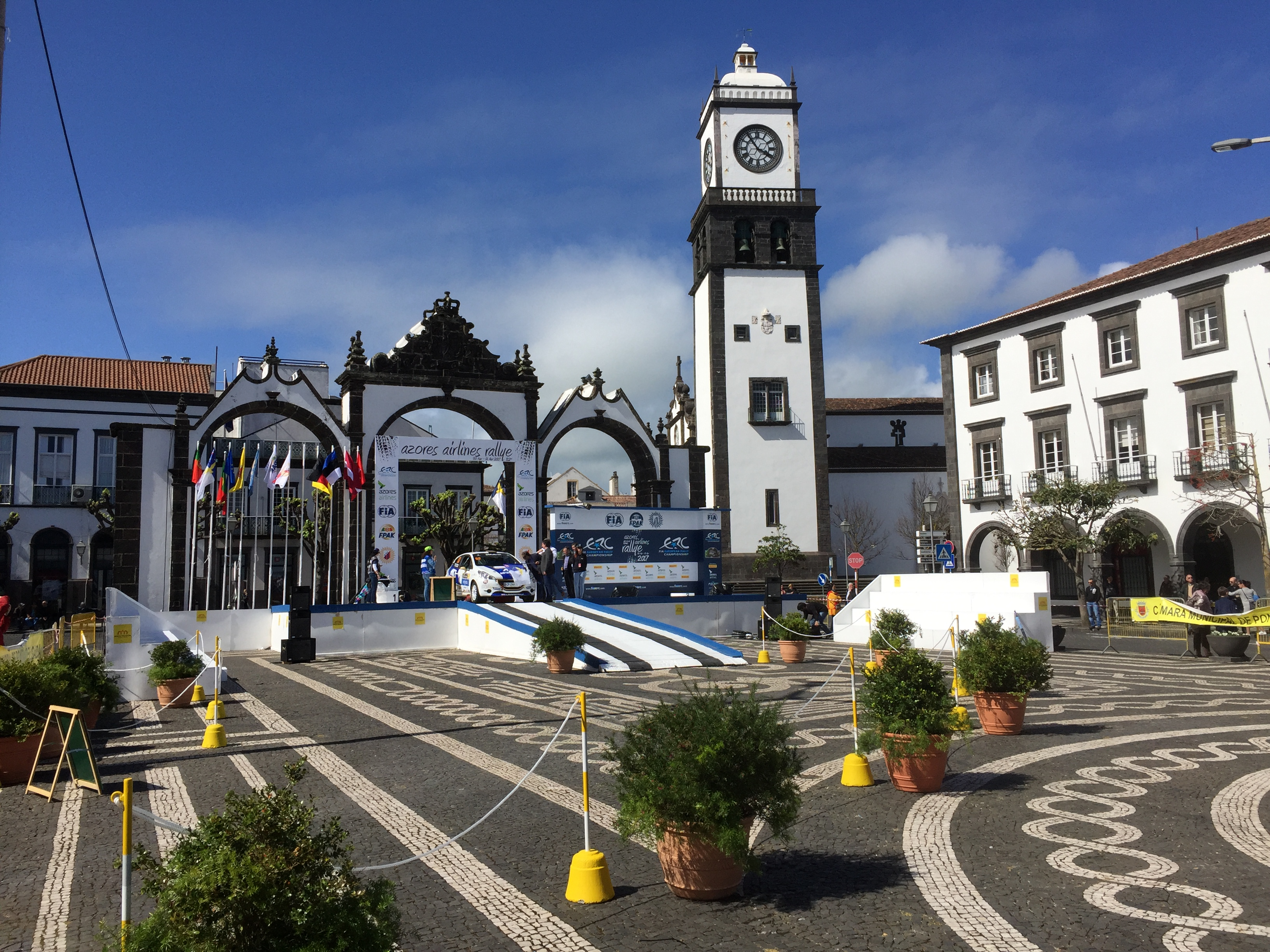
Start podium in Ponta Delgada at the first event of the 2017 season

The 2017 European Rally Championship was the 65th season of the FIA European Rally Championship, the European continental championship series in rallying. The season was also the fifth following the merge between the European Rally Championship and the Intercontinental Rally Challenge. Kajetan Kajetanowicz was the reigning champion and went on to win the third straight ERC title.

This season, the European Junior Championship is split into two new categories. ERC Junior U27, which totals six events, is for drivers born on or after 1 January 1990 competing in R2 cars on Pirelli tyres. With the best four rounds counting, the winner will receive a career progression fund worth 100,000 euros to use in ERC Junior U28 in 2018.

ERC Junior U28 offers the next step on the rallying pyramid for drivers born on or after 1 January 1989. Again totalling six rounds with the best four scores counting, drivers use R5 cars with no restriction on tyre choice. The champion will get a drive on a European round of the 2018 FIA World Rally Championship as a P1 driver in a 2016-specification World Rally Car.

== Calendar ==
The calendar for the 2017 season features only eight rallies compared to the previous season. Rallies dropped from the calendar were Circuit of Ireland, Ypres Rally and Rally Estonia. New event is the Rally di Roma Capitale.

Round	Dates	Rally name	Surface	
1	31 March – 2 April	(Portugal) Rallye Açores	Gravel	ERC Junior Round 1
2	5–7 May	(Spain) Rally Islas Canarias	Tarmac	ERC Junior Round 2
3	2–4 June	(Greece) Acropolis Rally	Gravel	
4	16–18 June	Cyprus Rally	Gravel	
5	3–5 August	(Poland) Rajd Rzeszowski	Tarmac	ERC Junior Round 3
6	25–27 August	(Czech Republic) Barum Rally Zlín	Tarmac	ERC Junior Round 4
7	15–17 September	(Italy) Rally di Roma Capitale	Tarmac	ERC Junior Round 5
8	6–8 October	(Latvia) Rally Liepāja	Gravel	ERC Junior Round 6

== Teams and drivers ==
=== ERC ===
Entries
Constructor	Car	Entrant	Class	Tyre	Drivers	Co-drivers	Rounds	
Ford	Ford Fiesta R5	(Poland) Lotos Rally Team	R5	P	(Poland) Kajetan Kajetanowicz	(Poland) Jarosław Baran	All	
Ford	Ford Fiesta R5	(Russia) Russian Performance Motorsport	R5	P	(Russia) Alexey Lukyanuk	(Russia) Alexey Arnautov	1–2, 5–8	
Ford	Ford Fiesta R5	(Portugal) ARC Sport	R5	MI	(Portugal) Ricardo Moura	(Portugal) António Costa	1	
Ford	Ford Fiesta R5	(Portugal) ARC Sport	R5	MI	(Portugal) Joaquim Alves	(Portugal) Luís Ramalho	1	
Ford	Ford Fiesta R5	(Republic of Ireland) Combilift Rallying	R5	P	(Republic of Ireland) Josh Moffett	(Republic of Ireland) James Fulton	1, 5–6	U28
Ford	Ford Fiesta R5	(Poland) Tiger Energy Drink Rallye Team	R5	P	(Poland) Tomasz Kasperczyk	(Poland) Damian Syty	1	U28
Ford	Ford Fiesta R5	(Poland) Tiger Energy Drink Rallye Team	R5	MI	(Poland) Tomasz Kasperczyk	(Poland) Damian Syty	2, 5	U28
Ford	Ford Fiesta R5	(Portugal) Team Além Mar	R5	P	(Portugal) Luís Rego	(Portugal) Nuno Rodrigues da Silva	1	U28
Ford	Ford Fiesta R5	(Turkey) Castrol Ford Team Türkiye	R5	P	(Turkey) Murat Bostanci	(Turkey) Onur Vatansever	1–6	
Ford	Ford Fiesta R5	(Poland) C-Rally	R5	P	(Poland) Jarosław Kołtun	(Poland) Ireneusz Pleskot	1	
Ford	Ford Fiesta R5	(Poland) C-Rally	R5	MI	(Poland) Jarosław Kołtun	(Poland) Ireneusz Pleskot	2	
Ford	Ford Fiesta R5	(Poland) Rally Technology	R5	P	(Poland) Łukasz Habaj	(Poland) Daniel Dymurski	1, 8	
Ford	Ford Fiesta R5	(Poland) Rally Technology	R5	MI	(Poland) Łukasz Habaj	(Poland) Daniel Dymurski	2, 5–7	
Ford	Ford Fiesta R5	(Poland) Rally Technology	R5	MI	(Poland) Zbigniew Gabryś	(Poland) Artur Natkaniec	5	
Ford	Ford Fiesta R5	(Portugal) P&B Racing	R5	P	(Portugal) João Barros	(Portugal) Jorge Henriques	1	
Ford	Ford Fiesta R5	(Portugal) P&B Racing	R5	P	(Portugal) Elias Barros	(Portugal) Paulo Babo	1	
Ford	Ford Fiesta R5	(Czech Republic) Gemini Clinic Rally Team	R5	MI	(France) Bryan Bouffier	(France) Denis Giraudet	2	
Ford	Ford Fiesta R5	(Czech Republic) Gemini Clinic Rally Team	R5	MI	(France) Bryan Bouffier	(France) Gilbert Dini	5	
Ford	Ford Fiesta R5	(Czech Republic) Gemini Clinic Rally Team	R5	MI	(France) Bryan Bouffier	(France) Xavier Panseri	6–7	
Ford	Ford Fiesta R5	(Spain) Auto Laca Competición	R5	MI	(Spain) Luis Monzón	(Spain) José Carlos Déniz	2	
Ford	Ford Fiesta R5	(Spain) RMC Motorsport	R5	MI	(Spain) Cristian García	(Spain) Eduardo González	2	
Ford	Ford Fiesta R5	(Spain) RMC Motorsport	R5	MI	(Spain) Cristóbal García	(Spain) Antonio Pérez	2	
Ford	Ford Fiesta R5	(United Kingdom) Autotek Motorsport	R5	MI	(Qatar) Nasser Al-Attiyah	(France) Matthieu Baumel	3–4	
Ford	Ford Fiesta R5	(Turkey) MRB Racing Team	R5	P	(Turkey) Rauf Denktaş	(Turkey) Bora Derviş	4	
Ford	Ford Fiesta R5	(Germany) Toksport World Rally Team	R5	P	(Turkey) Bora Manyera	(Turkey) Cem Çerkez	4	
Ford	Ford Fiesta R5	(Norway) Adapta Motorsport AS	R5	MI	(Norway) Mads Østberg	(Sweden) Patrik Barth	5	
Ford	Ford Fiesta R5	(Czech Republic) GK Forge Metkom Rally Team	R5	MI	(Poland) Jarosław Szeja	(Poland) Marcin Szeja	5–6	
Ford	Ford Fiesta R5	(Hungary) Juhász Média Kft.	R5	HK	(Hungary) Lázló Német	(Hungary) János Szegő	5–6	
Ford	Ford Fiesta R5	(Czech Republic) EuroOil Invelt Team	R5	P	(Czech Republic) Václav Pech	(Czech Republic) Petr Uhel	6	
Ford	Ford Fiesta R5	(Czech Republic) Svarmetal Motorsport	R5	P	(Czech Republic) Martin Vlček	(Czech Republic) Jindřiška Žáková	6	
Ford	Ford Fiesta R5	(Czech Republic) CS – TRT Rally Sport	R5	P	(Czech Republic) Roman Odložilík	(Czech Republic) Martin Tureček	6	
Ford	Ford Fiesta R5	(Czech Republic) A-Team	R5	P	(Czech Republic) Miroslav Jakeš	(Czech Republic) Marcela Ehlová	6	
Ford	Ford Fiesta R5	(Czech Republic) A-Team	R5	P	(Czech Republic) Tomáš Kurka	(Czech Republic) David Šmeidler	6	
Ford	Ford Fiesta R5	(Italy) Erreffe Rally Team	R5	P	(France) Stéphane Consani	(France) Valentin Salmon	7	U28
Ford	Ford Fiesta R5	(United Kingdom) M-Sport World Rally Team	R5	P	(Finland) Kalle Rovanperä	(Finland) Jonne Halttunen	8	
Ford	Ford Fiesta R5	(Latvia) Neikšāns Rally Sport	R5	P	(Latvia) Jānis Berķis	(Latvia) Edgars Čeporjus	8	
Ford	Ford Fiesta S2000	(Turkey) MRB Racing Team	S	P	(Turkey) Mehmet Yucel	(Turkey) Akan Keskiner	4	
Škoda	Škoda Fabia R5	(Austria) BRR Baumschlager Rally & Rally Team	R5	P	(Germany) Marijan Griebel	(Germany) Stefan Kopczyk	1–2, 5–7	U28
Škoda	Škoda Fabia R5	(Austria) BRR Baumschlager Rally & Rally Team	R5	P	(Czech Republic) Tomáš Kostka	(Czech Republic) Ladislav Kučera	6	
Škoda	Škoda Fabia R5	(Latvia) Sports Racing Technologies	R5	P	(Latvia) Ralfs Sirmacis	(Latvia) Arturs Šimins	1, 8	U28
Škoda	Škoda Fabia R5	(Latvia) Sports Racing Technologies	R5	P	(Russia) Nikolay Gryazin	(Russia) Yaroslav Fedorov	All	U28
Škoda	Škoda Fabia R5	(Czech Republic) ACCR Czech Team	R5	MI	(Czech Republic) Jan Černý	(Czech Republic) Petr Černohorský	1–2, 5–7	U28
Škoda	Škoda Fabia R5	(Netherlands) Wevers Sport	R5	MI	(Germany) Albert von Thurn und Taxis	(Belgium) Bjorn Degandt	1–2, 5–7	
Škoda	Škoda Fabia R5	(Netherlands) Wevers Sport	R5	P	(Germany) Albert von Thurn und Taxis	(Belgium) Bjorn Degandt	3–4, 8	
Škoda	Škoda Fabia R5	(Portugal) AR Vidal Racing	R5	MI	(Portugal) Pedro Meireles	(Portugal) Mário Castro	1	
Škoda	Škoda Fabia R5	(Portugal) ARC Sport	R5	MI	(Portugal) Bruno Magalhães	(Portugal) Hugo Magalhães	All	
Škoda	Škoda Fabia R5	(Portugal) BP Ultimate Škoda Team	R5	P	(Portugal) Miguel Barbosa	(Portugal) Miguel Ramalho	1	
Škoda	Škoda Fabia R5	(Portugal) Sports & You	R5	P	(Portugal) Diogo Salvi	(Portugal) Carlos Magalhães	1	
Škoda	Škoda Fabia R5	(Italy) Motorsport Italia Srl	R5	P	(Italy) Max Rendina	(Italy) Emanuele Inglesi	1–3, 5–6	
Škoda	Škoda Fabia R5	(Italy) Motorsport Italia Srl	R5	P	(Cyprus) Charalambos Timotheou	(Greece) Christos Kouzionis	4	
Škoda	Škoda Fabia R5	(Italy) Motorsport Italia Srl	R5	P	(Italy) Tonino Di Cosimo	(Italy) Paolo Francescucci	7	
Škoda	Škoda Fabia R5	(France) Team 2C Compétition	R5	MI	(France) Sylvain Michel	(France) Jérôme Degout	2, 5–7	U28
Škoda	Škoda Fabia R5	(Slovakia) Rufa Sport	R5	MI	(Poland) Grzegorz Grzyb	(Poland) Przemek Zawada	2	
Škoda	Škoda Fabia R5	(Slovakia) Rufa Sport	R5	MI	(Poland) Grzegorz Grzyb	(Poland) Bogusław Browiński	5	
Škoda	Škoda Fabia R5	(Slovakia) Rufa Sport	R5	MI	(Poland) Grzegorz Grzyb	(Poland) Jakub Wróbel	6–7	
Škoda	Škoda Fabia R5	(Slovakia) Rufa Sport	R5	P	(Poland) Grzegorz Grzyb	(Poland) Jakub Wróbel	3	
Škoda	Škoda Fabia R5	(Hungary) Botka – Tlusťák Racing	R5	P	(Czech Republic) Antonín Tlusťák	(Czech Republic) Ivo Vybíral	2–4, 6	
Škoda	Škoda Fabia R5	(Hungary) Botka – Tlusťák Racing	R5	P	(Hungary) Dávid Botka	(Hungary) Ramón Ferencz	5	
Škoda	Škoda Fabia R5	(Hungary) Botka – Tlusťák Racing	R5	P	(Hungary) Dávid Botka	(Hungary) Márk Mesterházi	6–7	
Škoda	Škoda Fabia R5	(Spain) ACSM Rallye Team	R5	MI	(Spain) Pedro Burgo	(Spain) Marcos Burgo	2	
Škoda	Škoda Fabia R5	(Spain) Auto Laca Competición	R5	MI	(Spain) Yeray Lemes	(Spain) Daniel Sosa	2	
Škoda	Škoda Fabia R5	Team Greece	R5	P	(Greece) Yorgo Philippedes	(Greece) Leonidas Mahaeras	3	
Škoda	Škoda Fabia R5	Eurosol Racing Team Hungary	R5	P	(Greece) Socratis Tsolakidis	(Greece) Harris Dimos	3	
Škoda	Škoda Fabia R5	(Czech Republic) Kresta Racing	R5	P	(Poland) Filip Nivette	(Poland) Kamil Heller	5	
Škoda	Škoda Fabia R5	(Czech Republic) Škoda Motorsport	R5	MI	(Czech Republic) Jan Kopecký	(Czech Republic) Pavel Dresler	6	
Škoda	Škoda Fabia R5	(Czech Republic) Mogul Racing Team	R5	MI	(Czech Republic) Roman Kresta	(Czech Republic) Petr Starý	6	
Škoda	Škoda Fabia R5	(Czech Republic) Icari Rally Team	R5	MI	(Czech Republic) Pavel Valoušek	(Czech Republic) Veronika Havelková	6	
Škoda	Škoda Fabia R5	(Poland) Rally Technology	R5	MI	(Slovakia) Martin Koči	(Czech Republic) Filip Schovánek	6	
Škoda	Škoda Fabia R5	(Czech Republic) Klokočka Škoda Czech National Team	R5	P	(Czech Republic) Vojtěch Štajf	(Czech Republic) Markéta Skácelová	6	
Škoda	Škoda Fabia R5	(Finland) TGS Worldwide	R5	P	(Saudi Arabia) Rakan Al-Rashed	(Finland) Jarkko Kalliolepo	8	
Škoda	Škoda Fabia S2000	(Portugal) Veloso Motorsport	S	DM	(Portugal) Carlos Fernandes	(Portugal) Valter Cardoso	1	
Škoda	Škoda Fabia S2000	(Czech Republic) Vančík Motorsport	S	P	(Czech Republic) Jaromír Tarabus	(Czech Republic) Petr Machů	6	
Peugeot	Peugeot 208 T16 R5	(France) Peugeot Rally Academy	R5	MI	(Spain) José Antonio Suárez	(Spain) Cándido Carrera	1–2, 5–8	U28
Peugeot	Peugeot 208 T16 R5	(France) Peugeot Rally Academy	R5	MI	(Spain) Pepe López	(Spain) Borja Rozada	1–2, 5–8	U28
Peugeot	Peugeot 208 T16 R5	(Italy) Delta Rally	R5	P	(France) Robert Consani	(France) Patrick Chiappe	7	
Citroën	Citroën DS3 R5	(Hungary) Botka – Tlusťák Racing	R5	P	(Hungary) Dávid Botka	(Hungary) Péter Szeles	1–2	
Citroën	Citroën DS3 R5	(Portugal) Raly/Auto Açoreana Racing	R5	P	(Portugal) Ruben Rodrigues	(Portugal) Estevão Rodrigues	1	
Citroën	Citroën DS3 R5	(Portugal) Sports & You	R5	P	(Portugal) Carlos Vieira	(Portugal) Jorge Carvalho	1	
Citroën	Citroën DS3 R5	(Spain) Escudería Ourense	R5	P	(Spain) Sergio Vallejo	(Spain) Diego Vallejo	2	
Citroën	Citroën DS3 R5	(Cyprus) Tsouloftas Rally Team	R5	P	(Cyprus) Alex Tsouloftas	(France) Denis Giraudet	3	
Citroën	Citroën DS3 R5	(Cyprus) Tsouloftas Rally Team	R5	P	(Cyprus) Alex Tsouloftas	(Cyprus) Stelios Elia	4	
Citroën	Citroën DS3 R5	(Czech Republic) Gekon Racing	R5	MI	(Italy) Simone Tempestini	(Romania) Sergiu Itu	7	
Hyundai	Hyundai i20 R5	(Portugal) Veloso Motorsport	R5	DM	(Portugal) Manuel Castro	(Portugal) Luís Costa	1	
Hyundai	Hyundai i20 R5	(Spain) RMC Motorsport	R5	MI	(Spain) Surhayén Pernía	(Spain) Carlos del Barrio	2	U28
Hyundai	Hyundai i20 R5	(Spain) Yacar Racing	R5	P	(Spain) Iván Ares	(Spain) José Pintor	2	
Mitsubishi	Mitsubishi Lancer Evo IX	(Cyprus) Q8 Oils Rally Team	N	Y	(Cyprus) Petros Panteli	(Cyprus) Kyprianos Christodoulou	3	
Mitsubishi	Mitsubishi Lancer Evo IX	(Cyprus) Q8 Oils Rally Team	N	Y	(Cyprus) George Pafitis	(Cyprus) Michalis Vassiliou	4	
Mitsubishi	Mitsubishi Lancer Evo IX	(Cyprus) Q8 Oils Rally Team	N	Y	(Cyprus) Dimitris Dimitriou	(Cyprus) Andreas Tsiakkas	4	
Mitsubishi	Mitsubishi Lancer Evo IX	(Cyprus) Psaltis Comline Rally Team	N	Y	(Cyprus) Panikos Polykarpou	(Austria) Gerald Winter	4	
Mitsubishi	Mitsubishi Lancer Evo IX	(Cyprus) Telsa Rallysport	N	P	(Cyprus) Savvas Savva	(Cyprus) Andreas Papandreou	4	
Porsche	Porsche 997 GT3	(France) RD Rallye Team	RGT	MI	(France) Romain Dumas	(France) Denis Giraudet	6–7	
Fiat	Fiat Abarth 124 RGT	(Italy) Bernini Rally	RGT	MI	(Italy) Fabrizio Andolfi	(Italy) Patrizia Romano	7	
Fiat	Fiat Abarth 124 RGT	(Italy) Bernini Rally	RGT	MI	(Italy) Andrea Nucita	(Italy) Marco Vozzo	7	
Fiat	Fiat Abarth 124 RGT	(Italy) Bernini Rally	RGT	MI	(Italy) Andrea Modanesi	(Italy) Daniele Renzetti	7	

=== ERC-2 ===
Entries
Constructor	Car	Entrant	Class	Tyre	Drivers	Co-drivers	Rounds
Mitsubishi	Mitsubishi Lancer Evo X	(Russia) Russian Performance Motorsport	N	P	(Russia) Sergey Remennik	(Russia) Mark Rozin	All
Mitsubishi	Mitsubishi Lancer Evo X	(Latvia) ASRT Rally Team	N	P	(Italy) Zelindo Melegari	(Italy) Maurizio Barone	1
Mitsubishi	Mitsubishi Lancer Evo X	(Spain) Calm Competició	N	P	(Portugal) Luís Pimentel	(Portugal) Bruno Pimentel	2
Mitsubishi	Mitsubishi Lancer Evo X	(Hungary) Érdi Rally Team	N	P	(Hungary) Tibor Érdi	(Hungary) György Papp	2–3, 5–7
Mitsubishi	Mitsubishi Lancer Evo X	(Lithuania) Pro Racing	N	P	(Hungary) Tibor Érdi	(Hungary) György Papp	8
Mitsubishi	Mitsubishi Lancer Evo X	(Cyprus) Denner Rally Team	N	P	(Cyprus) Deniz Denner	(Cyprus) Ömer Topçu	4
Mitsubishi	Mitsubishi Lancer Evo X	(Latvia) Vorobjovs Racing	N	P	(Latvia) Jānis Vorobjovs	(Latvia) Ivo Pūķis	8
Mitsubishi	Mitsubishi Lancer Evo IX	(Portugal) LP Competições	N	P	(Portugal) Luís Pimentel	(Portugal) Bruno Pimentel	1
Mitsubishi	Mitsubishi Lancer Evo IX	(Italy) S.C. Movisport srl	N	P	(Italy) Zelindo Melegari	(Italy) Maurizio Barone	2–8
Mitsubishi	Mitsubishi Lancer Evo IX	(Portugal) ACB Racing	N	P	(Lebanon) Gilbert Bannout	(Lebanon) Rony Maroun	2
Mitsubishi	Mitsubishi Lancer Evo IX	(Cyprus) Petrolina – Eni Racing Team	N	P	(Cyprus) Christos Demosthenous	(Cyprus) Pambos Laos	4
Mitsubishi	Mitsubishi Lancer Evo IX	(Cyprus) Q8 Oils Rally Team	N	Y	(Cyprus) Petros Panteli	(Cyprus) Kyprianos Christodoulou	4
Mitsubishi	Mitsubishi Lancer Evo IX	(Latvia) Neikšāns Rally Sport	N	P	(Latvia) Reinis Nitišs	(Latvia) Māris Naikšāns	8
Subaru	Subaru Impreza WRX STI	Subaru Poland Rally Team	N	P	(Poland) Miko Marczyk	(Poland) Sebastian Dwornik	5
Subaru	Subaru Impreza WRX STI	Subaru Poland Rally Team	N	P	(Poland) Marcin Słobodzian	(Poland) Jakub Wróbel	5

=== ERC-3 ===
Entries
Constructor	Car	Entrant	Class	Tyre	Drivers	Co-drivers	Rounds
Opel	Opel Adam R2	(Germany) Opel Rallye Junior Team	R2	P	(United Kingdom) Chris Ingram	(United Kingdom) Elliott Edmondson	1–2, 5–7
Opel	Opel Adam R2	(Germany) Opel Rallye Junior Team	R2	P	(United Kingdom) Chris Ingram	(United Kingdom) Ross Whittock	8
Opel	Opel Adam R2	(Germany) Opel Rallye Junior Team	R2	P	(Italy) Tamara Molinaro	(Austria) Ursula Mayrhofer	1–2, 5–6
Opel	Opel Adam R2	(Germany) Opel Rallye Junior Team	R2	P	(Italy) Tamara Molinaro	(Italy) Giovanni Bernacchini	7
Opel	Opel Adam R2	(Germany) Opel Rallye Junior Team	R2	P	(Italy) Tamara Molinaro	(Belgium) Martijn Wydaeghe	8
Opel	Opel Adam R2	(Germany) Opel Rallye Junior Team	R2	P	(Finland) Jari Huttunen	(Finland) Antti Linnaketo	1–2, 5–8
Opel	Opel Adam R2	(Poland) MSZ Racing	R2	P	(Poland) Aleks Zawada	(Poland) Grzegorz Dachowski	2, 5–7
Opel	Opel Adam R2	(Netherlands) MCC Sport	R2	MI	(Netherlands) Timo van der Marel	(Australia) Rebecca Smart	2
Opel	Opel Adam R2	(Hungary) Botka – Tlusťák Racing	R2	P	(Czech Republic) Radomír Kupec	(Czech Republic) Petr Glössl	5–6
Opel	Opel Adam R2	(Finland) TGS Worldwide	R2	P	(Finland) Alex Forsström	(Finland) Eetu Hellsten	8
Peugeot	Peugeot 208 R2	(Czech Republic) ACCR Czech Team	R2	P	(Czech Republic) Dominik Brož	(Czech Republic) Petr Těšínský	1–2, 6–8
Peugeot	Peugeot 208 R2	(Czech Republic) ACCR Czech Team	R2	P	(Czech Republic) Filip Mareš	(Czech Republic) Jan Hloušek	1–2, 5–8
Peugeot	Peugeot 208 R2	(Spain) GC Motorsport	R2	P	(Poland) Aleks Zawada	(Poland) Grzegorz Dachowski	1, 8
Peugeot	Peugeot 208 R2	(Spain) GC Motorsport	R2	P	(Spain) Marcos González	(Spain) Rogelio Peñate	1
Peugeot	Peugeot 208 R2	(Spain) GC Motorsport	R2	P	(Spain) Marcos González	(Spain) Raquel Ruiz	2
Peugeot	Peugeot 208 R2	(Hungary) Botka – Tlusťák Racing	R2	P	(Czech Republic) Karel Kupec	(Czech Republic) Ondřej Krajča	1–2, 5
Peugeot	Peugeot 208 R2	(Hungary) Botka – Tlusťák Racing	R2	P	(Czech Republic) Karel Kupec	(Czech Republic) Vladimír Osička	7–8
Peugeot	Peugeot 208 R2	(France) Saintéloc Junior Team	R2	P	(United Kingdom) Catie Munnings	(Germany) Anne Stein	1–2, 5–8
Peugeot	Peugeot 208 R2	(Latvia) Neikšāns Rally Sport	R2	P	(Russia) Artur Muradian	(Russia) Pavel Chelebaev	1, 4–6, 8
Peugeot	Peugeot 208 R2	(Belgium) JB Malhebre Racing Spirit	R2	P	(Belgium) Sébastien Bedoret	(Belgium) Thomas Walbrecq	2, 5–7
Peugeot	Peugeot 208 R2	(Poland) Rally Technology	R2	MI	(Poland) Dariusz Poloński	(Poland) Balbina Gryczyńska	2, 5, 7
Peugeot	Peugeot 208 R2	(Poland) Rally Technology	R2	P	(Poland) Dariusz Poloński	(Poland) Balbina Gryczyńska	8
Peugeot	Peugeot 208 R2	(Spain) Escudería La Coruña	R2	MI	(Spain) Roberto Blach	(Spain) Ariday Bonilla	2
Peugeot	Peugeot 208 R2	(Czech Republic) Sparrow Racing Team	R2	P	(Austria) Simon Wagner	(Austria) Gerald Winter	5–6
Peugeot	Peugeot 208 R2	(Czech Republic) Sparrow Racing Team	R2	P	(Austria) Julian Wagner	(Austria) Jürgen Heigl	6
Peugeot	Peugeot 208 R2	(Hungary) Klaus Motorsport	R2	P	(Hungary) Kristóf Klausz	(Hungary) Botond Csányi	5–8
Peugeot	Peugeot 208 R2	(Latvia) LMT Autosporta Akadēmija	R2	P	(Latvia) Mārtiņs Sesks	(Latvia) Andris Mālnieks	8
Ford	Ford Fiesta R2T	(Turkey) Castrol Ford Team Türkiye	R2	P	(Turkey) Buğra Banaz	(Turkey) Burak Erdener	1–6, 8
Ford	Ford Fiesta R2T	(Turkey) Castrol Ford Team Türkiye	R2	P	(Turkey) Ümit Can Özdemir	(Turkey) Batuhan Memişyazici	3–4, 8
Ford	Ford Fiesta R2T	(Turkey) Castrol Ford Team Türkiye	R2	P	(Turkey) Ismet Toktaş	(Turkey) Sedat Bostanci	3–4
Ford	Ford Fiesta R2T	(Turkey) Castrol Ford Team Türkiye	R2	P	(Turkey) Murat Bostanci	(Turkey) Our Vatansever	8
Ford	Ford Fiesta R2	(Turkey) Castrol Ford Team Türkiye	R2	P	(Poland) Jerzy Tomaszczyk	(Poland) Kamil Kozdroń	6
Ford	Ford Fiesta R2	(Czech Republic) ACCR Czech Team	R2	P	(Czech Republic) Dominik Brož	(Czech Republic) Petr Těšínský	5
Ford	Ford Fiesta R2	(Germany) Toksport World Rally Team	R2	P	(Turkey) Deniz Fahri	(Turkey) Bariş Kalfaoğlu	4
Citroën	Citroën DS3 R3T	(Spain) RMC Motorsport	R3	MI	(Spain) Emma Falcón	(Spain) Sara Fernández	2
Citroën	Citroën DS3 R3T	(Spain) RMC Motorsport	R3	MI	(Spain) Emma Falcón	(Spain) Rogelio Peñate	5–7
Citroën	Citroën DS3 R3T	(Cyprus) Glasurit Rally Team	R3	P	(Cyprus) Christos Mannouris	(Cyprus) Andreas Chrysostomou	4
Toyota	Toyota GT86 CS-R3	(Germany) Toyota Motorsport GMBH	R3	P	(Italy) Luca Rossetti	(Italy) Eleonora Mori	5
Toyota	Toyota GT86 CS-R3	(Italy) Motorsport Italia Srl	R3	P	(Italy) Luca Bottarelli	(Italy) Manuel Fenoli	5
Toyota	Toyota GT86 CS-R3	(Italy) Motorsport Italia Srl	R3	P	(Italy) Riccardo Canzian	(Italy) Matteo Nobili	6
Toyota	Toyota GT86 CS-R3	(Italy) Motorsport Italia Srl	R3	P	(Italy) Gianandrea Pisani	(Italy) Alessio Migliorati	7
Toyota	Toyota GT86 CS-R3	(Italy) Motorsport Italia Srl	R3	P	(Italy) Marco Ciufoli	(Italy) Alessandro Ciufoli	7

=== ERC Junior U27 ===
Entries
Constructor	Car	Entrant	Class	Tyre	Drivers	Co-drivers	Rounds
Opel	Opel Adam R2	(Germany) Opel Rallye Junior Team	R2	P	(United Kingdom) Chris Ingram	(United Kingdom) Elliott Edmondson	1–5
Opel	Opel Adam R2	(Germany) Opel Rallye Junior Team	R2	P	(United Kingdom) Chris Ingram	(United Kingdom) Ross Whittock	6
Opel	Opel Adam R2	(Germany) Opel Rallye Junior Team	R2	P	(Italy) Tamara Molinaro	(Austria) Ursula Mayrhofer	1–4
Opel	Opel Adam R2	(Germany) Opel Rallye Junior Team	R2	P	(Italy) Tamara Molinaro	(Italy) Giovanni Bernacchini	5
Opel	Opel Adam R2	(Germany) Opel Rallye Junior Team	R2	P	(Italy) Tamara Molinaro	(Belgium) Martijn Wydaeghe	6
Opel	Opel Adam R2	(Germany) Opel Rallye Junior Team	R2	P	(Finland) Jari Huttunen	(Finland) Antti Linnaketo	All
Opel	Opel Adam R2	(Poland) MSZ Racing	R2	P	(Poland) Aleks Zawada	(Poland) Grzegorz Dachowski	2–5
Opel	Opel Adam R2	(Hungary) Botka – Tlusťák Racing	R2	P	(Czech Republic) Radomír Kupec	(Czech Republic) Petr Glössl	3–4
Opel	Opel Adam R2	(Finland) TGS Worldwide	R2	P	(Finland) Alex Forsström	(Finland) Eetu Hellsten	6
Peugeot	Peugeot 208 R2	(Czech Republic) ACCR Czech Team	R2	P	(Czech Republic) Dominik Brož	(Czech Republic) Petr Těšínský	1–2, 4-6
Peugeot	Peugeot 208 R2	(Czech Republic) ACCR Czech Team	R2	P	(Czech Republic) Filip Mareš	(Czech Republic) Jan Hloušek	All
Peugeot	Peugeot 208 R2	(Spain) GC Motorsport	R2	P	(Poland) Aleks Zawada	(Poland) Grzegorz Dachowski	1, 6
Peugeot	Peugeot 208 R2	(Spain) GC Motorsport	R2	P	(Spain) Marcos González	(Spain) Rogelio Peñate	1
Peugeot	Peugeot 208 R2	(Spain) GC Motorsport	R2	P	(Spain) Marcos González	(Spain) Raquel Ruiz	2
Peugeot	Peugeot 208 R2	(Hungary) Botka – Tlusťák Racing	R2	P	(Czech Republic) Karel Kupec	(Czech Republic) Ondřej Krajča	1–3
Peugeot	Peugeot 208 R2	(Hungary) Botka – Tlusťák Racing	R2	P	(Czech Republic) Karel Kupec	(Czech Republic) Vladimír Osička	5–6
Peugeot	Peugeot 208 R2	(France) Saintéloc Junior Team	R2	P	(United Kingdom) Catie Munnings	(Germany) Anne Stein	All
Peugeot	Peugeot 208 R2	(Belgium) JB Malhebre Racing Spirit	R2	P	(Belgium) Sébastien Bedoret	(Belgium) Thomas Walbrecq	2–5
Peugeot	Peugeot 208 R2	(Czech Republic) Sparrow Racing Team	R2	P	(Austria) Simon Wagner	(Austria) Gerald Winter	3–4
Peugeot	Peugeot 208 R2	(Czech Republic) Sparrow Racing Team	R2	P	(Austria) Julian Wagner	(Austria) Jürgen Heigl	4
Peugeot	Peugeot 208 R2	(Hungary) Klaus Motorsport	R2	P	(Hungary) Kristóf Klausz	(Hungary) Botond Csányi	3–6
Peugeot	Peugeot 208 R2	(Latvia) LMT Autosporta Akadēmija	R2	P	(Latvia) Mārtiņš Sesks	(Latvia) Andris Mālnieks	6
Ford	Ford Fiesta R2T	(Turkey) Castrol Ford Team Türkiye	R2	P	(Turkey) Buğra Banaz	(Turkey) Burak Erdener	1–4, 6
Ford	Ford Fiesta R2	(Czech Republic) ACCR Czech Team	R2	P	(Czech Republic) Dominik Brož	(Czech Republic) Petr Těšínský	5

=== Ladies Trophy ===
Entries
Constructor	Car	Entrant	Class	Tyre	Drivers	Co-drivers	Rounds
Opel	Opel Adam R2	(Germany) Opel Rallye Junior Team	R2	P	(Italy) Tamara Molinaro	(Austria) Ursula Mayrhofer	1–2, 5–6
Opel	Opel Adam R2	(Germany) Opel Rallye Junior Team	R2	P	(Italy) Tamara Molinaro	(Italy) Giovanni Bernacchini	7
Opel	Opel Adam R2	(Germany) Opel Rallye Junior Team	R2	P	(Italy) Tamara Molinaro	(Belgium) Martijn Wydaeghe	8
Peugeot	Peugeot 208 R2	(France) Saintéloc Junior Team	R2	P	(United Kingdom) Catie Munnings	(Germany) Anne Stein	1–2, 5–8
Peugeot	Peugeot 208 R2	(Spain) Auto Laca Conpetición	R2	MI	(Spain) Elba Correa	(Spain) Juan Monzón	2
Ford	Ford Fiesta R2	(Spain) Mavisa Sport	R2	P	(Italy) Christine Giampaoli	(Spain) Luy Galán	1
Citroën	Citroën DS3 R3T	(Spain) RMC Motorsport	R3	MI	(Spain) Emma Falcón	(Spain) Sara Fernández	2
Citroën	Citroën DS3 R3T	(Spain) RMC Motorsport	R3	MI	(Spain) Emma Falcón	(Spain) Rogelio Penãte	5–7
Citroën	Citroën C2 R2	(Hungary) Bakó Rally Team	R2	MI	(Bulgaria) Ekaterina Stratieva	(Bulgaria) Georgi Avramov	6

== Results ==
Round	Rally name	Podium finishers			
Round	Rally name	Rank	Driver	Car	Time
1	(Portugal) Rallye Açores (30 March–1 April) — Results	1	(Portugal) Bruno Magalhães	Škoda Fabia R5	02:37:04.3
1	(Portugal) Rallye Açores (30 March–1 April) — Results	2	(Germany) Marijan Griebel	Škoda Fabia R5	02:38:38.7
1	(Portugal) Rallye Açores (30 March–1 April) — Results	3	(Republic of Ireland) Josh Moffett	Ford Fiesta R5	02:41:55.2
2	(Spain) Rally Islas Canarias (4–6 May) — Results	1	(Russia) Alexey Lukyanuk	Ford Fiesta R5	02:06:01.8
2	(Spain) Rally Islas Canarias (4–6 May) — Results	2	(Poland) Kajetan Kajetanowicz	Ford Fiesta R5	02:06:59.0
2	(Spain) Rally Islas Canarias (4–6 May) — Results	3	(Portugal) Bruno Magalhães	Škoda Fabia R5	02:07:05.4
3	(Greece) Acropolis Rally (2–4 June) — Results	1	(Poland) Kajetan Kajetanowicz	Ford Fiesta R5	02:49:40.6
3	(Greece) Acropolis Rally (2–4 June) — Results	2	(Portugal) Bruno Magalhães	Škoda Fabia R5	02:52:39.3
3	(Greece) Acropolis Rally (2–4 June) — Results	3	(Poland) Grzegorz Grzyb	Škoda Fabia R5	02:55:45.9
4	Cyprus Rally (16–18 June) — Results	1	(Qatar) Nasser Al-Attiyah	Ford Fiesta R5	02:31:44.3
4	Cyprus Rally (16–18 June) — Results	2	(Cyprus) Panikos Polykarpou	Mitsubishi Lancer Evo IX	02:38:03.8
4	Cyprus Rally (16–18 June) — Results	3	(Cyprus) Christos Demosthenous	Mitsubishi Lancer Evo IX	02:39:24.7
5	(Poland) Rajd Rzeszowski (3–5 August) — Results	1	(France) Bryan Bouffier	Ford Fiesta R5	01:58:12.6
5	(Poland) Rajd Rzeszowski (3–5 August) — Results	2	(Poland) Kajetan Kajetanowicz	Ford Fiesta R5	01:58:51.1
5	(Poland) Rajd Rzeszowski (3–5 August) — Results	3	(Germany) Marijan Griebel	Škoda Fabia R5	01:59:08.2
6	(Czech Republic) Barum Rally Zlín (25–27 August) — Results	1	(Czech Republic) Jan Kopecký	Škoda Fabia R5	01:56:15.2
6	(Czech Republic) Barum Rally Zlín (25–27 August) — Results	2	(Russia) Alexey Lukyanuk	Ford Fiesta R5	01:57:10.7
6	(Czech Republic) Barum Rally Zlín (25–27 August) — Results	3	(Czech Republic) Roman Kresta	Škoda Fabia R5	01:57:38.0
7	(Italy) Rally di Roma Capitale (15–17 September) — Results	1	(France) Bryan Bouffier	Ford Fiesta R5	02:02:16.0
7	(Italy) Rally di Roma Capitale (15–17 September) — Results	2	(Poland) Kajetan Kajetanowicz	Ford Fiesta R5	02:02:16.3
7	(Italy) Rally di Roma Capitale (15–17 September) — Results	3	(Portugal) Bruno Magalhães	Škoda Fabia R5	02:03:13.9
8	(Latvia) Rally Liepāja (6–8 October) — Results	1	(Russia) Nikolay Gryazin	Škoda Fabia R5	01:19:22.1
8	(Latvia) Rally Liepāja (6–8 October) — Results	2	(Finland) Kalle Rovanperä	Ford Fiesta R5	01:19:40.6
8	(Latvia) Rally Liepāja (6–8 October) — Results	3	(Poland) Łukasz Habaj	Ford Fiesta R5	01:22:14.9

== Championship standings ==
=== Points Systems ===
==== ERC, ERC-2, ERC-3, ERC Junior U28, ERC Junior U27 and Ladies Trophy ====
- For both the Drivers' and Teams' championships of the ERC, ERC-2 and ERC-3, only the best seven results will be retained by each driver or team.
- For both the Drivers' and Teams' championships of the ERC Junior U28, the ERC Junior U27 and the Ladies Trophy, only the best four results will be retained by each driver or team.
- Points for final position are awarded as in following table:

Position	1st	2nd	3rd	4th	5th	6th	7th	8th	9th	10th
Points	25	18	15	12	10	8	6	4	2	1

- Bonus points awarded for position in each Leg

Position	1st	2nd	3rd	4th	5th	6th	7th
Points	7	6	5	4	3	2	1

=== Drivers' Championships ===
==== ERC ====
Pos	Driver	AZO (Portugal)	CAN (Spain)	ACR (Greece)	CYP (Cyprus)	RZE (Poland)	ZLÍ (Czech Republic)	RMC (Italy)	LIE (Latvia)	Points	Best 6
1	(Poland) Kajetan Kajetanowicz	27^{0+6}	2^{18+11}	1^{25+12}	14^{0+7}	2^{18+11}	5^{10+2}	2^{18+13}	Ret^{0+5}	156	145
2	(Portugal) Bruno Magalhães	1^{25+13}	3^{15+10}	2^{18+12}	Ret	9^{2}	9^{2}	3^{15+10}	Ret	121	121
3	(France) Bryan Bouffier		9^{2}			1^{25+14}	10^{1+3}	1^{25+13}		84	84
4	(Russia) Alexey Lukyanuk	Ret^{0+7}	1^{25+14}	WD		Ret	2^{18+9}	Ret	Ret	73	73
5	(Germany) Marijan Griebel	2^{18+8}	10^{1}			3^{15+8}	6^{8+4}	WD		62	62
6	(Poland) Grzegorz Grzyb		Ret	3^{15+7}		4^{12+7}	Ret	4^{12+7}		60	60
7	(Russia) Nikolay Gryazin	5^{10+4}	11^{0+1}	Ret	29	Ret	14	8^{4+1}	1^{25+14}	59	59
8	(Qatar) Nasser Al-Attiyah			Ret^{0+7}	1^{25+13}					45	45
9	(Czech Republic) Jan Kopecký						1^{25+14}			39	39
10	(Poland) Łukasz Habaj	Ret	Ret			7^{6+1}	13	7^{6+1}	3^{15+8}	37	37
11	(Spain) José Antonio Suárez	Ret	16^{0+2}			6^{8+3}	15	27^{0+5}	4^{12+7}	37	37
12	(Finland) Kalle Rovanperä								2^{18+8}	30	30
13	(Spain) Pepe López	4^{12+4}	6^{8+3}			Ret	20	Ret	Ret^{0+3}	30	30
14	(Germany) Albert von Thurn und Taxis	Ret	14	Ret	4^{12+5}	15	42	26	5^{10+2}	29	29
15	(Cyprus) Alexandros Tsouloftas			4^{12+4}	8^{4+6}					26	26
16	(Cyprus) Panikos Polykarpou				2^{18+8}					26	26
17	(Czech Republic) Roman Kresta						3^{15+9}			24	24
18	(Republic of Ireland) Josh Moffett	3^{15+5}				8^{4}	18			24	24
19	(Cyprus) Christos Demosthenous				3^{15+5}					20	20
20	(France) Sylvain Michel		8^{4+1}			5^{10+5}				20	20
21	(Spain) Iván Ares		4^{12+7}							19	19
22	(Czech Republic) Tomáš Kostka						4^{12+7}			19	19
23	(Spain) Luis Monzón		5^{10+5}							15	15
24	(Romania) Simone Tempestini							5^{10+5}		15	15
25	(Greece) Socratis Tsolakidis			5^{10+4}						14	14
26	(Czech Republic) Jan Černý	Ret^{0+1}	Ret			12	12^{0+2}	6^{8+2}		13	13
27	(Cyprus) Petros Panteli				5^{10+1}					11	11
28	(Italy) Zelindo Melegari	34	WD	6^{8+2}	11	25	44	Ret	Ret	10	10
29	(Cyprus) Savvas Savva				6^{8+2}					10	10
30	(Portugal) Pedro Meireles	6^{8+1}								9	9
31	(Latvia) Reinis Nitišs								6^{8+1}	9	9
32	(Spain) Cristian García		7^{6+2}							8	8
33	(Latvia) Ralfs Sirmacis	7^{6+2}							WD	8	8
34	(Greece) Vassilis Drimousis			7^{6+1}						7	7
35	(Slovakia) Martin Koči						7^{6+1}			7	7
36	(Cyprus) Stavros Antoniou				7^{6}					6	6
37	(Lithuania) Linas Vaškys								7^{6}	6	6
38	(Hungary) Tibor Érdi jr.		30	10^{1+3}		Ret	34	17	9^{2}	6	6
39	(Cyprus) Charalambos Timotheou				16^{0+5}					5	5
40	(Turkey) Bugra Banaz	26	47	8^{4}	28	21	37		20	4	4
41	(Portugal) João Barros	8^{4}								4	4
42	(Czech Republic) Pavel Valoušek						8^{4}			4	4
43	(Sweden) Tom Kristensson								8^{4}	4	4
44	(Czech Republic) Antonín Tlusťák		19	Ret	22^{0+4}		17			4	4
45	(Turkey) Murat Bostanci	17	17	Ret^{0+3}	Ret	14	21		19	3	3
46	(Latvia) Jānis Berķis								24^{0+3}	3	3
47	(Turkey) Ümit Can Özdemir			9^{2}	18				21	2	2
48	(Portugal) Carlos Vieira	9^{2}								2	2
49	(Turkey) Rauf Denktaş				9^{2}					2	2
50	(France) Stéphane Consani							9^{2}		2	2
51	(United Kingdom) Chris Ingram	11	21			26	38	14	10^{1}	1	1
52	(Portugal) Miguel Barbosa	10^{1}								1	1
53	(Cyprus) George Paphitis				10^{1}					1	1
54	(Poland) Tomasz Kasperczyk	Ret	Ret			10^{1}				1	1
55	(Italy) Tonino Di Cosimo							10^{1}		1	1
56	(Greece) Yorgo Philippedes			Ret^{0+1}						1	1
57	(Latvia) Jānis Vorobjovs								Ret^{0+1}	1	1

Key
Colour	Result
Gold	Winner
Silver	2nd place
Bronze	3rd place
Green	Points finish
Blue	Non-points finish
Blue	Non-classified finish (NC)
Purple	Did not finish (Ret)
Black	Excluded (EX)
Black	Disqualified (DSQ)
White	Did not start (DNS)
White	Cancelled (C)
Blank	Withdrew entry from the event (WD)

==== ERC-2 ====
Pos	Driver	AZO (Portugal)	CAN (Spain)	ACR (Greece)	CYP (Cyprus)	RZE (Poland)	ZLÍ (Czech Republic)	RMC (Italy)	LIE (Latvia)	Points	Best 6
1	(Hungary) Tibor Érdi		1^{25+13}	2^{18+7}		Ret^{0+7}	1^{25+14}	1^{25+14}	2^{18+10}	176	176
2	(Italy) Zelindo Melegari	2^{18+6}	WD	1^{25+13}	3^{15+10}	1^{25+11}	2^{18+11}	Ret	Ret^{0+3}	155	155
3	(Russia) Sergey Remmenik	Ret^{0+7}	2^{18+13}	Ret		2^{18+7}	3^{15+11}	Ret	3^{15+10}	114	114
4	(Portugal) Luís Pimentel	1^{25+13}	4^{12+5}							55	55
5	(Cyprus) Christos Demosthenous				1^{25+14}					39	39
6	(Latvia) Reinis Nitišs								1^{25+11}	36	36
7	(Cyprus) Petros Panteli				2^{18+12}					30	30
8	(Lebanon) Gilbert Bannout		3^{15+9}							24	24
9	(Latvia) Jānis Vorobjovs								Ret^{0+7}	7	7
10	(Poland) Marcin Słobodzian					Ret^{0+6}				6	6

==== ERC-3 ====
Pos	Driver	AZO (Portugal)	CAN (Spain)	ACR (Greece)	CYP (Cyprus)	RZE (Poland)	ZLÍ (Czech Republic)	RMC (Italy)	LIE (Latvia)	Points	Best 6
1	(United Kingdom) Chris Ingram	1^{25+14}	1^{25+10}			8^{4+3}	8^{6+7}	3^{15+11}	1^{25+12}	157	157
2	(Czech Republic) Filip Mareš	3^{15+8}	Ret^{0+2}			2^{18+12}	2^{18+9}	1^{25+12}	3^{15+9}	143	143
3	(Finland) Jari Huttunen	Ret^{0+6}	2^{18+10}			1^{25+14}	Ret	2^{18+13}	4^{12+9}	125	125
4	(Poland) Aleks Zawada	2^{18+11}	13^{0+7}			3^{15+9}	1^{25+12}	Ret	5^{10+8}	115	115
5	(Turkey) Bugra Banaz	5^{10+5}	9^{2}	1^{25+14}	4^{12+8}	5^{10+5}	6^{8+3}		9^{2}	104	102
6	(Turkey) Ümit Can Özdemir			2^{18+12}	1^{25+12}				10^{1}	68	68
7	(Czech Republic) Karel Kupec	Ret	5^{10+5}			4^{12+6}		4^{12+8}	12	53	53
8	(Turkey) Ismet Toktas			3^{15+10}	2^{18+9}					52	52
9	(Poland) Dariusz Poloński		6^{8+1}			Ret		5^{10+6}	6^{8+4}	37	37
10	(Italy) Tamara Molinaro	4^{12+5}	10^{1}			7^{6}	10^{1}	7^{6+1}	11	32	32
11	(Czech Republic) Dominik Brož	7^{6+1}	11			6^{8+1}	5^{10+6}	Ret	Ret	32	32
12	(Latvia) Mārtiņš Sesks								2^{18+11}	29	29
13	(Spain) Roberto Blach		3^{15+10}							25	25
14	(Turkey) Deniz Fahri				3^{15+10}					25	25
15	(Austria) Simon Wagner						3^{15+9}			24	24
16	(Netherlands) Timo van der Marel		4^{12+10}							22	22
17	(Austria) Julian Wagner						4^{12+9}			21	21
18	(Hungary) Kristóf Klausz							6^{8+3}	7^{6+3}	20	20
19	(Russia) Artur Muradian	6^{8+5}			Ret	Ret			Ret	13	13
20	(Spain) Emma Falcón		7^{6+1}			Ret	9^{2}	Ret		9	9
21	(Poland) Jerzy Tomarszczyk						8^{4+1}			5	5
22	(Turkey) Murat Bostanci								8^{4}	4	4
23	(Spain) Marcos González	Ret	8^{4}							4	4
24	(United Kingdom) Catie Munnings	Ret	12			Ret	11	8^{4}		4	4
25	(Italy) Marco Ciufoli							9^{2}		2	2

==== Ladies Trophy ====
Pos	Driver	AZO (Portugal)	CAN (Spain)	ACR (Greece)	CYP (Cyprus)	RZE (Poland)	ZLÍ (Czech Republic)	RMC (Italy)	LIE (Latvia)	Points	Best 4
1	(Italy) Tamara Molinaro	1^{25+7}	2^{18+12}			1^{25+14}	2^{18+12}	1^{25+13}	1^{25+14}	208	148
2	(United Kingdom) Catie Munnings	Ret	3^{15+10}			Ret^{0+6}	3^{15+11}	2^{18+11}		86	86
3	(Spain) Emma Falcón		1^{25+14}			Ret	1^{25+13}	Ret^{0+7}		84	84
4	(Bulgaria) Ekaterina Stratieva						4^{12+8}			20	20

==== ERC Junior U28 ====
Pos	Driver	AZO (Portugal)	CAN (Spain)	RZE (Poland)	ZLÍ (Czech Republic)	RMC (Italy)	LIE (Latvia)	Points	Best 4
1	(Germany) Marijan Griebel	1^{25+13}	3^{15+8}	1^{25+13}	1^{25+14}	WD		138	138
2	(Russia) Nikolay Gryazin	4^{12+10}	4^{12+9}	Ret	3^{15+7}	2^{18+11}	1^{25+14}	133	112
3	(Spain) José Antonio Suarez	Ret	6^{8+9}	3^{15+10}	4^{12+9}	4^{12+7}	2^{18+11}	111	94
4	(Czech Republic) Jan Černý	Ret^{0+4}	Ret	6^{8+3}	2^{18+9}	1^{25+12}		79	79
5	(Spain) Pepe López	3^{15+6}	1^{25+12}	Ret	6^{8+7}	Ret	Ret^{0+6}	79	79
6	(Republic of Ireland) Josh Moffett	2^{18+10}		4^{12+7}	5^{10+8}			65	65
7	(France) Sylvain Michel		2^{18+10}	2^{18+10}				56	56
8	(France) Stéphane Consani					3^{15+10}		25	25
9	(Poland) Tomasz Kasperczyk	Ret^{0+3}	Ret	5^{10+5}				18	18
10	(Spain) Surhayen Pernía		5^{10+6}					16	16
11	(Latvia) Ralfs Sirmacis	5^{10+5}					WD	15	15
12	(Portugal) Luís Rego	6^{8+4}						12	12

==== ERC Junior U27 ====
Pos	Driver	AZO (Portugal)	CAN (Spain)	RZE (Poland)	ZLÍ (Czech Republic)	RMC (Italy)	LIE (Latvia)	Points	Best 4
1	(United Kingdom) Chris Ingram	1^{25+14}	1^{25+12}	8^{4+3}	7^{6+7}	3^{15+11}	1^{25+12}	159	139
2	(Finland) Jari Huttunen	Ret^{0+6}	2^{18+12}	1^{25+14}	Ret	2^{18+13}	4^{12+10}	128	122
3	(Czech Republic) Filip Mareš	3^{15+8}	Ret^{0+4}	2^{18+12}	2^{18+9}	1^{25+12}	3^{15+9}	145	118
4	(Poland) Aleks Zawada	2^{18+11}	9^{2+7}	3^{15+9}	1^{25+12}	Ret	5^{10+8}	117	108
5	(Czech Republic) Karel Kupec	Ret	3^{15+9}	4^{12+6}		4^{12+8}	9^{2}	64	64
6	(Turkey) Bugra Banaz	5^{10+6}	5^{10+3}	5^{10+5}	6^{8+4}		7^{6+1}	63	56
7	(Italy) Tamara Molinaro	4^{12+5}	6^{8+3}	7^{6}	8^{4+1}	6^{8+4}	8^{4}	55	46
8	(Czech Republic) Dominik Brož	6^{8+2}	7^{6}	6^{8+1}	5^{10+6}	Ret	Ret^{0+1}	42	41
9	(Latvia) Mārtiņš Sesks						2^{18+11}	29	29
10	(Hungary) Kristóf Klausz					5^{10+6}	6^{8+4}	28	28
11	(Austria) Simon Wagner				3^{15+9}			24	24
12	(Austria) Julian Wagner				4^{12+9}			21	21
13	(Spain) Marcos González	Ret	4^{12+6}					18	18
14	(United Kingdom) Catie Munnings	Ret	8^{4}	Ret	9^{2}	7^{6+1}		13	13

=== Teams' Championships ===
Pos	Team	AZO (Portugal)	CAN (Spain)	ACR (Greece)	CYP (Cyprus)	RZE (Poland)	ZLÍ (Czech Republic)	RMC (Italy)	LIE (Latvia)	Points	Best 6
1	(Turkey) Castrol Ford Team Turkiye	5	10	1	1	8	3		9	163	153
2	(Czech Republic) ACCR Czech Team	3	14			1	1	1	7	151	151
3	(Germany) Opel Rallye Junior Team	1	1			7	4	3	2	148	148
4	(Poland) Lotos Rally Team	11	3	2	4	5	7	5	Ret	106	104
5	(Latvia) Sports Racing Technologies	2	12	Ret	7	Ret	NC	9	3	82	82
6	(Poland) RallyTechnology	Ret	9			10	8	4	1	78	78
7	(France) Peugeot Rally Academy	4	8			9	NC	11	6	72	72
8	(Czech Republic) Gemini Clinic Rally Team		11			2	11	2		64	64
9	(Germany) ADAC Opel Junior Rally Team	Ret	4			3	Ret	6		61	61
10	(Hungary) Botka - Tlusťák Racing	Ret	7	Ret	6	4	NC	8		56	56
11	(Russia) Russian Performance Motorsport	Ret	2	Ret		12	5	Ret	8	54	54
12	(Slovakia) Rufa Sport		Ret	3		6	Ret	7		48	48
13	(Latvia) Neikšans Rally Sport	8							4	30	30
14	(Cyprus) Petrolina Eni Racing Team				2					25	25
15	(Czech Republic) Škoda Motorsport						2			25	25
16	(Spain) RMC Motorsport		5			Ret	9	Ret		24	24
17	(Cyprus) Q8 Oils Rally Team				3					18	18
18	(Latvia) LMT Autorsport Academy								5	18	18
19	(Hungary) Klaus Motorsport							10	10	16	16
20	(Spain) Auto Laca Competición		6							15	15
21	(Hungary) Mogul Racing Team						6			15	15
22	(Italy) Motorsport Italia				5			13		14	14
23	(Portugal) Sports & You	6								12	12
24	(Portugal) BP Ultimate Škoda Team	7								10	10
25	(France) Saintéloc Junior Team	Ret	16			Ret	12	12		9	9
26	(Poland) Tiger Energy Drink Rallye Team	Ret	Ret			11				8	8
27	(Portugal) Raly/Autoaçoreana Racing	9								8	8
28	(Spain) GC Motorsport		13							8	8
29	(Czech Republic) Icari Rally Team						10			6	6
30	(Poland) C-Rally	10	15							5	5
31	(Czech Republic) CS-TRT Rally Sport						13			2	2
