= Rallye Açores =

Rallye Azores
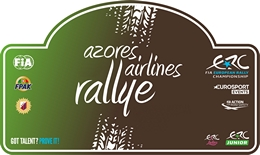
- 56th Rallye logo
- Status: Active
- Genre: Motor Sport event
- Date: Spring
- Frequency: Annual
- Location: Azores
- Country: Portugal
- Inaugurated: 1965
- Website: https://www.azoresrallye.com/

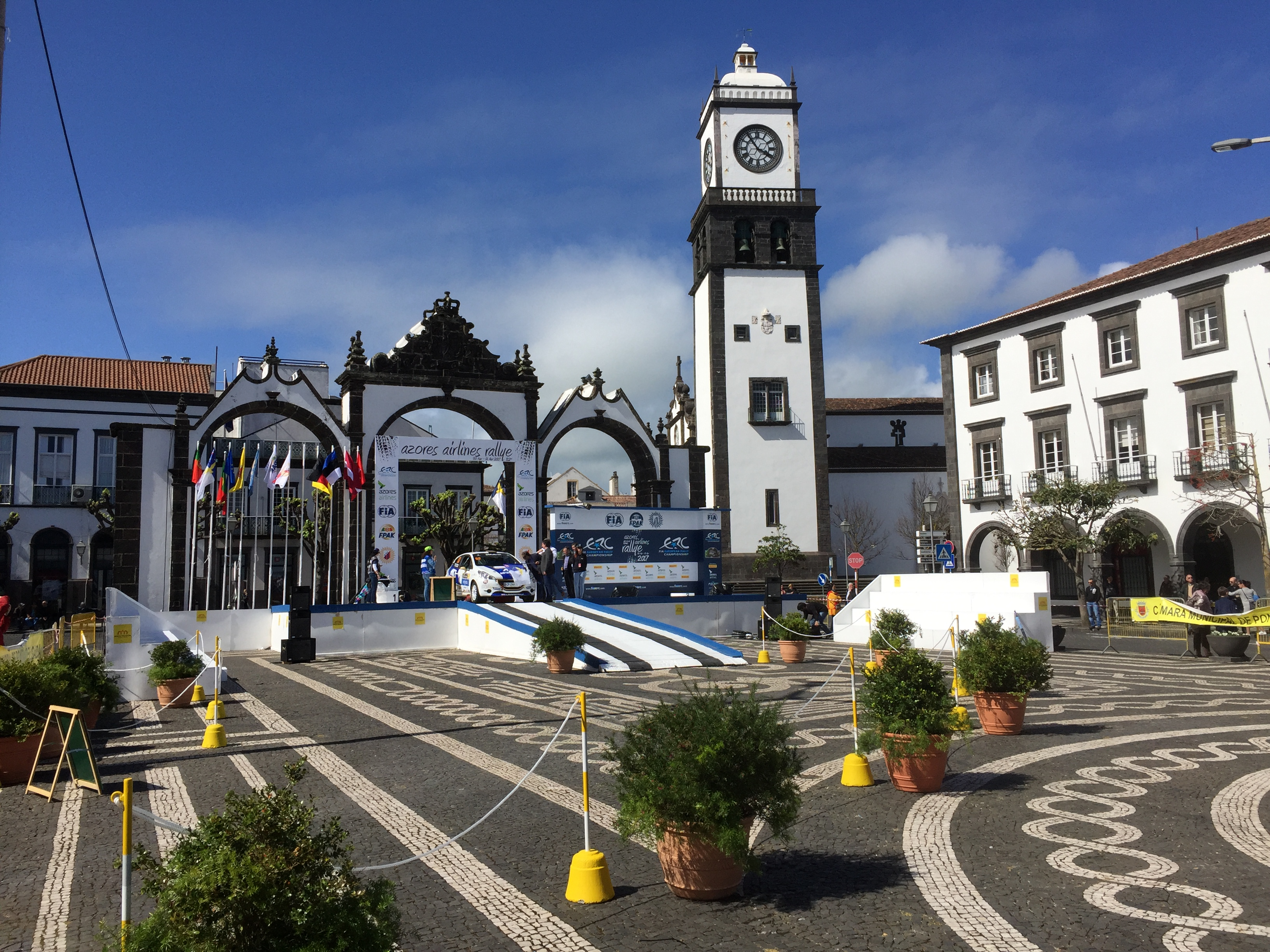
Start podium in Ponta Delgada at the 2017 event

The Rallye Açores, known originally as the Volta à Ilha de São Miguel is an international rallying event based on the Portuguese island of São Miguel Island in the Azores.

The rally was first run in 1965 as locals gathered for a race called Volta à Ilha de São Miguel, which translated means Round the Island of São Miguel. This was six years after the establishment of the Rali Vinho da Madeira on the Portuguese island of Madeira, much closer to Africa.

The event has been a long running round of the European Rally Championship and the Portuguese Rally Championship as well as spawning its own championship in the Azores. Unlike other international events held on Atlantic Ocean islands that it is frequently paired with, the Rali Vinho da Madeira and the Rally Islas Canarias it is a gravel event.

Despite its isolated location, over 1500 kilometres from the coast of Portugal, it has since the early 1970s been a part of Portugal's national championship. It became an international event since 1992 when it was first included in the European Rally Championship. The rally was demoted to the European Rally Cup West in 2004 and dropped entirely in 2006. In 2008 the rally regained international standing with the European Rally Cup South series and the Intercontinental Rally Challenge the following year. After the death of the IRC in 2012 the European Championship returned in 2013.

Portuguese drivers have dominated the event. A non-Portuguese driver did not win the event until the first international event was won in 1992 by Yves Loubet. Portuguese drivers continued to dominate, though, with Fernando Peres winning the rally seven times in the international era. Carlos Bica has won the event four times.

== List of winners ==
Sourced in part from:

Season	Winner	Car	Report
1965	(Portugal) Luís Toste	Fiat 1500	
1966	(Portugal) Luís Cordeiro	Ford Cortina GT	
1967	(Portugal) Luís Cordeiro	Ford Cortina GT	
1968	(Portugal) José Lampreia	Renault 8 Gordini	
1969	(Portugal) Américo Nunes	Porsche 911 S	
1970	(Portugal) Jorge Nascimento	BMW 2002	
1971	(Portugal) Raúl Mendonça	BMW 2002	
1972	(Portugal) António Borges	Porsche 911 S	
1973	(Portugal) Giovanni Salvi	Porsche 911 S	
1974	not held		
1975	(Portugal) Manuel Inácio	Opel 1904 SR	
1976	(Portugal) Giovanni Salvi	Ford Escort RS2000	
1977	(Portugal) "Larama"	Ford Escort RS1600	
1978	(Portugal) "Larama"	Ford Escort RS1600	
1979	(Portugal) José Pedro Borges	Opel Kadett GT/E	
1980	(Portugal) Mário Silva	Ford Escort RS	
1981	(Portugal) António Santinho Mendes	Datsun Violet 160J	
1982	(Portugal) Joaquim Santos	Ford Escort RS	
1983	(Portugal) Joaquim Santos	Ford Escort RS	
1984	(Portugal) Joaquim Santos	Ford Escort RS	
1985	(Portugal) Joaquim Moutinho	Renault 5 Turbo	
1986	(Portugal) Jorge Ortigão	Toyota Corolla GT	
1987	(Portugal) Inverno Amaral	Renault 11 Turbo	
1988	(Portugal) Carlos Bica	Lancia Delta HF	
1989	(Portugal) Carlos Bica	Lancia Delta HF	
1990	(Portugal) Carlos Bica	Lancia Delta HF	
1991	(Portugal) Carlos Bica	Lancia Delta Integrale 16V	
1992	(France) Yves Loubet	Toyota Celica GT-Four	
1993	(Portugal) José Miguel	Ford Sierra RS Cosworth	
1994	(Portugal) Fernando Peres	Ford Escort RS Cosworth	
1995	(Portugal) José Miguel	Ford Escort RS Cosworth	
1996	(Portugal) Fernando Peres	Ford Escort RS Cosworth	
1997	(Belgium) Bruno Thiry	Ford Escort RS Cosworth	
1998	(Portugal) Fernando Peres	Ford Escort WRC	
1999	(Belgium) Grégoire De Mévius	Subaru Impreza 555	
2000	(Estonia) Markko Märtin	Subaru Impreza WRC	
2001	(Finland) Juha Kankkunen	Subaru Impreza WRC	
2002	(Portugal) Rui Madeira	Ford Focus WRC	
2003	(Portugal) Fernando Peres	Ford Escort RS Cosworth	
2004	(Portugal) Fernando Peres	Mitsubishi Lancer Evo VII	
2005	(Portugal) Fernando Peres	Mitsubishi Lancer Evo VIII	
2006	(Portugal) Armindo Araújo	Mitsubishi Lancer Evo VIII	
2007	(Portugal) Fernando Peres	Mitsubishi Lancer Evo IX	
2008	(Portugal) Bruno Magalhães	Peugeot 207 S2000	
2009	(United Kingdom) Kris Meeke	Peugeot 207 S2000	Report
2010	(Portugal) Bruno Magalhães	Peugeot 207 S2000	Report
2011	(Finland) Juho Hänninen	Škoda Fabia S2000	Report
2012	(Norway) Andreas Mikkelsen	Škoda Fabia S2000	Report
2013	(Czech Republic) Jan Kopecký	Škoda Fabia S2000	Report
2014	(Portugal) Bernardo Sousa	Ford Fiesta RRC	Report
2015	(Republic of Ireland) Craig Breen	Peugeot 208 T16 R5	Report
2016	(Portugal) Ricardo Moura	Ford Fiesta R5	Report
2017	(Portugal) Bruno Magalhães	Škoda Fabia R5	Report
2018	(Russia) Alexey Lukyanuk	Ford Fiesta R5	Report
2019	(Poland) Łukasz Habaj	Škoda Fabia R5	Report
2020	Rally cancelled due to COVID-19		
2021	(Norway) Andreas Mikkelsen	Škoda Fabia R5 Evo	Report
2022	(Spain) Efrén Llarena	Škoda Fabia R5 Evo	Report
2023	(France) Sébastien Loeb	Škoda Fabia RS Rally2	Report
