= Ricardo Moura =

Portuguese footballer (born 1988)

Personal information
- Full name: Ricardo Samuel Cruz Moura
- Date of birth: 14 December 1988 (age 37)
- Place of birth: Valongo, Portugal
- Height: 1.84 m (6 ft 1/2 in)
- Position: Goalkeeper

Team information
- Current team: Trofense
- Number: 1

Youth career
- 1996–1999: Infesta
- 1999–2001: Porto
- 2001–2007: Leixões

Senior career*
| Years | Team | Apps | (Gls) |
| 2007–2008 | Padroense | | |
| 2008–2012 | Sousense | 92 | (0) |
| 2012–2014 | Aves | 0 | (0) |
| 2014–2017 | Leixões | 85 | (0) |
| 2017–2018 | Tondela | 0 | (0) |
| 2018–2019 | Académica | 13 | (0) |
| 2019–2022 | Chaves | 6 | (0) |
| 2022–2024 | Leixões | 2 | (0) |
| 2024–2026 | Lusitânia | 7 | (0) |
| 2026– | Trofense | 0 | (0) |
- * Club domestic league appearances and goals as of 13:15, 4 November 2025 (UTC)

Ricardo Samuel Cruz Moura (born 14 December 1988) is a Portuguese professional footballer who plays as a goalkeeper for Liga 3 club Trofense.

== Club career ==
=== Aves ===
Born in Valongo, Porto District, Moura spent his early career in amateur football. In the summer of 2012, he moved straight to the Segunda Liga with C.D. Aves but failed to make an appearance in the league during his two-year spell, playing six matches in all competitions including a 6–0 away loss against S.L. Benfica in the fifth round of the Taça de Portugal.

=== Leixões ===
Moura signed with Leixões S.C. – he had already represented them at youth level, scoring from his goal in a 2–2 draw with Vitória de Guimarães– for the 2014–15 season. His professional league debut took place on 1 March 2015, in a 2–0 away win over C.D. Trofense.

Moura only missed one league game in 46 in the 2015–16 campaign, helping his team to finish in 18th place and thus avoid relegation from the second division.

=== Tondela ===
On 6 August 2017, Moura agreed to a two-year contract at C.D. Tondela. Barred by Cláudio Ramos, he did not make any appearances during his tenure.

=== Later career ===
Moura subsequently returned to the second tier, where he represented, mostly as a backup, Académica de Coimbra, G.D. Chaves and Leixões. In summer 2024, he went down to Liga 3 by joining Lusitânia FC, helping the club to reach the professional leagues for the first time in their 101-year history in his first season.

For 2026–27, the 37-year-old Moura signed a one-year deal with third-division side Trofense.
