= Ford Fiesta R5 =

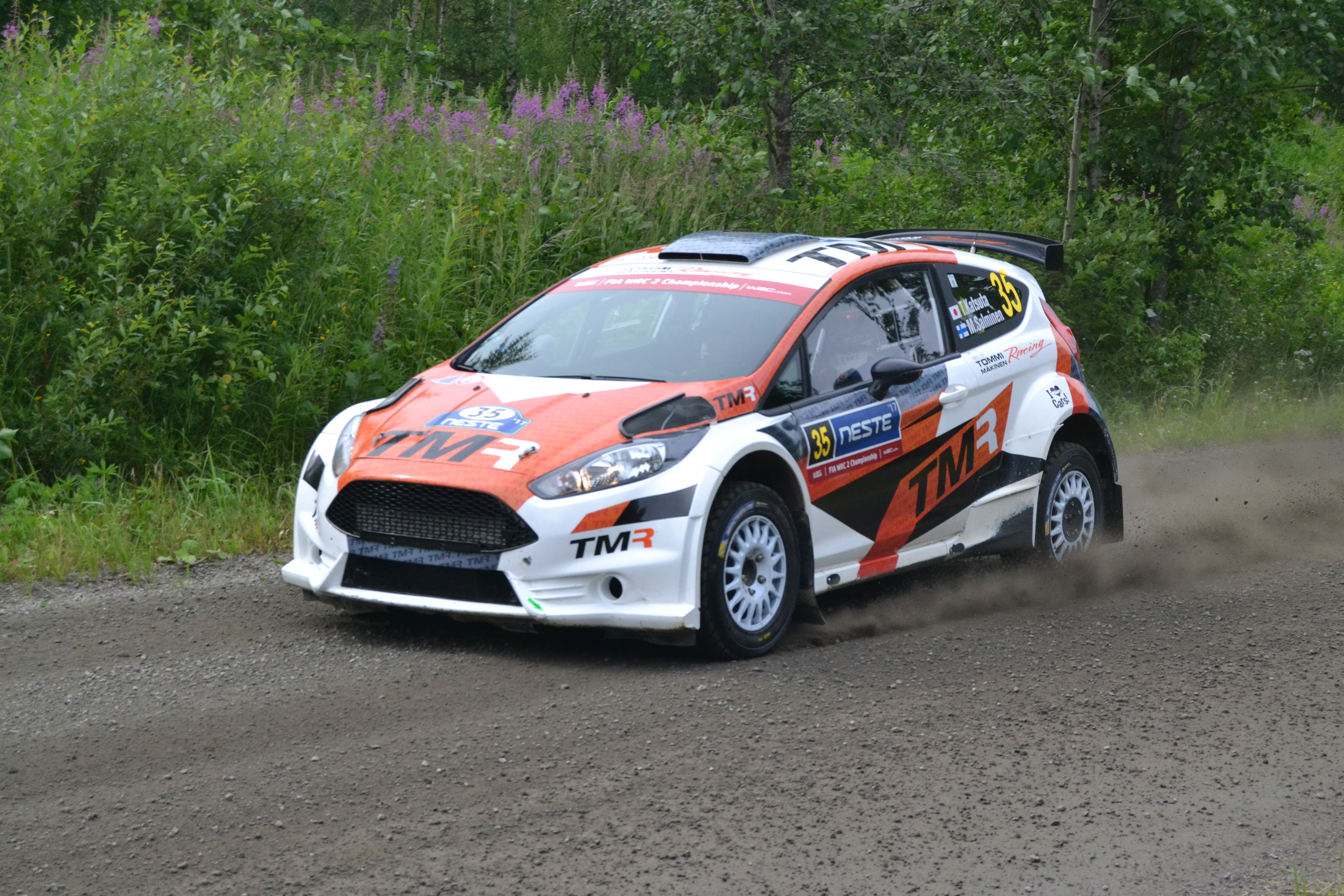
- A Fiesta R5 driven by Takamoto Katsuta and Marko Salminen at the 2017 Rally Finland

Overview
- Manufacturer: M-Sport
- Production: 2013–2019
- Assembly: Cockermouth, England
- Designer: M-Sport

Body and chassis
- Class: R5
- Layout: front-engine, four-wheel drive
- Platform: Ford Fiesta ST

Powertrain
- Engine: Ecoboost 1.6 L (98 cu in) 4-cylinder, 16-valve
- Transmission: Sadev five-speed sequential gearbox mated to Sadev front and rear differential units

Dimensions
- Wheelbase: 2480 mm
- Length: 3965 mm
- Width: 1820 mm
- Kerb weight: 1230 kg

Chronology
- Successor: Ford Fiesta Rally2

The Ford Fiesta R5 is a rally car built by M-Sport and based upon the Ford Fiesta ST road car. It was the first car homologated under the R5 regulations that were introduced in 2013. The Fiesta R5 made its competitive début in 2013 and has competed in the World Rally Championship-2, European Rally Championship and various national competitions since then. An updated model known as the Fiesta R5 Mk. II was unveiled in 2019. Starting in 2019, M-Sport Ford WRT will enter factory-supported Fiesta R5s and Fiesta R5 Mk. IIs in the World Rally Championship-2.

Kajetan Kajetanowicz won the 2015, 2016 and 2017 European Rally Championship driver's titles driving a Fiesta R5, while Alexey Lukyanuk won the 2018 title.

== Results ==
=== World Rally Championship-2 Pro victories ===
No.	Event	Year	Driver	Co-driver
1	(Monaco) 2019 Monte Carlo Rally	2019	(United Kingdom) Gus Greensmith	(United Kingdom) Elliott Edmondson
2	2019 Rally Mexico	2019	(Poland) Łukasz Pieniążek	(Poland) Kamil Heller
3	(France) 2019 Tour de Corse	2019	(Poland) Łukasz Pieniążek	(Poland) Kamil Heller

=== World Rally Championship-2 victories ===
No.	Event	Year	Driver	Co-driver
1	2013 Rally Finland	2013	(Finland) Jari Ketomaa	(Finland) Marko Sallinen
2	(United Kingdom) 2013 Wales Rally GB	2013	(United Kingdom) Elfyn Evans	(United Kingdom) Daniel Barritt
3	(Monaco) 2014 Monte Carlo Rally	2014	(Ukraine) Yuriy Protasov	(Ukraine) Pavlo Cherepin
4	2014 Rally Mexico	2014	(Ukraine) Yuriy Protasov	(Ukraine) Pavlo Cherepin
5	2014 Rally Poland	2014	(Estonia) Ott Tänak	(Estonia) Raigo Mõlder
6	(Germany) 2014 Rallye Deutschland	2014	(Sweden) Pontus Tidemand	(Sweden) Emil Axelsson
7	(United Kingdom) 2014 Wales Rally GB	2014	(Finland) Jari Ketomaa	(Finland) Kaj Lindström
8	2015 Rally Sweden	2015	(Finland) Jari Ketomaa	(Finland) Kaj Lindström
9	(Monaco) 2016 Monte Carlo Rally	2016	(United Kingdom) Elfyn Evans	(United Kingdom) Craig Parry
10	2016 Rally Sweden	2016	(United Kingdom) Elfyn Evans	(United Kingdom) Craig Parry
11	(France) 2016 Tour de Corse	2016	(United Kingdom) Elfyn Evans	(United Kingdom) Craig Parry
12	(Germany) 2017 Rallye Deutschland	2017	(France) Eric Camilli	(France) Benjamin Veillas
13	(Spain) 2017 Rally Catalunya	2017	(Finland) Teemu Suninen	(Finland) Mikko Markkula
14	2017 Rally Australia	2017	(Finland) Kalle Rovanperä	(Finland) Jonne Halttunen
15	2018 Rally Sweden	2018	(Japan) Takamoto Katsuta	(Finland) Marko Salminen
16	2018 Rally Australia	2018	(Chile) Alberto Heller	(Argentina) José Diaz
17	2019 Rally Argentina	2019	(Chile) Pedro Heller	(Spain) Marc Martí
18	2019 Rally Chile	2019	(Japan) Takamoto Katsuta	(United Kingdom) Daniel Barritt

=== European Rally Championship victories ===
No.	Event	Year	Driver	Co-driver
1	2013 Rally Poland	2013	(Poland) Kajetan Kajetanowicz	(Poland) Jarosław Baran
2	2014 Rally Estonia	2014	(Estonia) Ott Tänak	(Estonia) Raigo Mõlder
3	(Austria) 2015 Internationale Jänner Rallye	2015	(Poland) Kajetan Kajetanowicz	(Poland) Jaroslaw Baran
4	2015 Cyprus Rally	2015	(Poland) Kajetan Kajetanowicz	(Poland) Jaroslaw Baran
5	(Greece) 2015 Acropolis Rally	2015	(Poland) Kajetan Kajetanowicz	(Poland) Jaroslaw Baran
6	(Switzerland) 2015 Rallye International du Valais	2015	(Russia) Alexey Lukyanuk	(Russia) Alexey Arnautov
7	(Spain) 2016 Rally Islas Canarias	2016	(Russia) Alexey Lukyanuk	(Russia) Alexey Arnautov
8	(Portugal) 2016 Rallye Açores	2016	(Portugal) Ricardo Moura	(Portugal) António Costa
9	(Poland) 2016 Rajd Rzeszowski	2016	(Poland) Kajetan Kajetanowicz	(Poland) Jaroslaw Baran
10	2016 Cyprus Rally	2016	(Russia) Alexey Lukyanuk	(Russia) Alexey Arnautov
11	(Spain) 2017 Rally Islas Canarias	2017	(Russia) Alexey Lukyanuk	(Russia) Alexey Arnautov
12	(Greece) 2017 Acropolis Rally	2017	(Poland) Kajetan Kajetanowicz	(Poland) Jarosław Baran
13	2017 Cyprus Rally	2017	(Qatar) Nasser Al-Attiyah	(France) Mathieu Barumel
14	(Poland) 2017 Rajd Rzeszowski	2017	(France) Bryan Bouffier	(France) Xavier Panseri
15	(Italy) 2017 Rally di Roma Capitale	2017	(France) Bryan Bouffier	(France) Xavier Panseri
16	(Spain) 2018 Rally Islas Canarias	2018	(Russia) Alexey Lukyanuk	(Russia) Alexey Arnautov
17	(Portugal) 2018 Rallye Açores	2018	(Russia) Alexey Lukyanuk	(Russia) Alexey Arnautov
18	(Italy) 2018 Rally di Roma Capitale	2018	(Russia) Alexey Lukyanuk	(Russia) Alexey Arnautov

== See also ==
- Ford Fiesta WRC
- Group R
  - Citroën C3 R5
  - Hyundai i20 R5
  - Škoda Fabia R5
  - Volkswagen Polo GTI R5
