= 2015 Middle East Rally Championship =

Seasons
- ← 2014 2016 →

The 2015 Middle East Rally Championship was an international rally championship sanctioned by the FIA. The championship was contested over eight events held in eight countries across the Middle East region, running from February to November. The championship was significantly expanded for the 2015 season. The Oman International Rally returned to the calendar after a seven-year absence, while Iran joined the championship for the first time with the Shiraz Rally debuting in May, the last rally before the mid-year winter break.

For the fifth season in a row, Qatar's Nasser Al-Attiyah won the championship title. Al-Attiyah won six of the seven rallies he contested – the only failure being a retirement in Lebanon – en route to his eleventh MERC title overall. With his victory in Oman, Al-Attiyah also tied Mohammed bin Sulayem for most rally wins in the MERC, with 60. Al-Attiyah finished 48 points of his nearest challenger, Abdulaziz Al-Kuwari, who finished five rallies in second place during the 2015 season. Third place in the championship went to Khalid Al Qassimi, who won the rally that Al-Attiyah did not contest, the Dubai International Rally. Roger Feghali won the season's other event in Lebanon, but did not compete in enough events to be eligible for the championship standings.

== Event calendar and results ==
The 2015 MERC was as follows:

Round	Rally name	Podium finishers				Statistics			
Round	Rally name	Rank	Driver	Car	Time	Stages	Length	Starters	Finishers
1	Qatar International Rally (5–7 February)	1	(Qatar) Nasser Al-Attiyah	Ford Fiesta RRC	2:12:10.1	12	263.27 km	12	8
1	Qatar International Rally (5–7 February)	2	(United Arab Emirates) Khalid Al Qassimi	Citroën DS3 RRC	2:18:03.3	12	263.27 km	12	8
1	Qatar International Rally (5–7 February)	3	(Qatar) Khalifa Al-Attiyah	Ford Fiesta RRC	2:27:00.0	12	263.27 km	12	8
2	Kuwait International Rally (12–14 March)	1	(Qatar) Nasser Al-Attiyah	Ford Fiesta RRC	2:33:36.1	13	250.46 km	19	13
2	Kuwait International Rally (12–14 March)	2	(United Arab Emirates) Khalid Al Qassimi	Citroën DS3 RRC	2:34:38.1	13	250.46 km	19	13
2	Kuwait International Rally (12–14 March)	3	(Saudi Arabia) Yazeed Al-Rajhi	Ford Fiesta RRC	2:36:05.8	13	250.46 km	19	13
3	(Iran) Shiraz Rally (6–8 May)	1	(Qatar) Nasser Al-Attiyah	Ford Fiesta RRC	1:52:56.2	14	247.84 km	22	7
3	(Iran) Shiraz Rally (6–8 May)	2	(Qatar) Abdulaziz Al-Kuwari	Ford Fiesta RRC	1:53:23.2	14	247.84 km	22	7
3	(Iran) Shiraz Rally (6–8 May)	3	(United Arab Emirates) Khalid Al Qassimi	Citroën DS3 RRC	1:54:23.9	14	247.84 km	22	7
4	Rally of Lebanon (4–6 September)	1	(Lebanon) Roger Feghali	Ford Fiesta R5	2:28:13.3	13	244.03 km	33	15
4	Rally of Lebanon (4–6 September)	2	(Lebanon) Nicolas Amiouni	Mitsubishi Lancer Evolution X	2:34:22.3	13	244.03 km	33	15
4	Rally of Lebanon (4–6 September)	3	(Lebanon) Tamer Ghandour	Mitsubishi Lancer Evolution X	2:34:38.2	13	244.03 km	33	15
5	Cyprus Rally (25–27 September)	1	(Qatar) Nasser Al-Attiyah	Ford Fiesta RRC	2:08:38.4	16	204.50 km	63	40
5	Cyprus Rally (25–27 September)	2	(Poland) Kajetan Kajetanowicz	Ford Fiesta R5	2:08:45.4	16	204.50 km	63	40
5	Cyprus Rally (25–27 September)	3	(Qatar) Abdulaziz Al-Kuwari	Ford Fiesta RRC	2:12:38.4	16	204.50 km	63	40
6	Jordan Rally (15–17 October)	1	(Qatar) Nasser Al-Attiyah	Ford Fiesta RRC	3:07:51.2	21	257.60 km	13	10
6	Jordan Rally (15–17 October)	2	(Qatar) Abdulaziz Al-Kuwari	Ford Fiesta RRC	3:37:22.2	21	257.60 km	13	10
6	Jordan Rally (15–17 October)	3	(United Arab Emirates) Salem Husam	Mitsubishi Lancer Evolution IX	3:41:37.6	21	257.60 km	13	10
7	Oman International Rally (5–7 November)	1	(Qatar) Nasser Al-Attiyah	Ford Fiesta RRC	2:28:00.5	13	250.82 km	19	10
7	Oman International Rally (5–7 November)	2	(Qatar) Abdulaziz Al-Kuwari	Ford Fiesta RRC	2:28:49.0	13	250.82 km	19	10
7	Oman International Rally (5–7 November)	3	(United Arab Emirates) Khalid Al Qassimi	Citroën DS3 RRC	2:29:24.6	13	250.82 km	19	10
8	(United Arab Emirates) Dubai International Rally (19–21 November)	1	(United Arab Emirates) Khalid Al Qassimi	Citroën DS3 RRC	1:58:41.5	12	254.92 km	14	14
8	(United Arab Emirates) Dubai International Rally (19–21 November)	2	(Qatar) Abdulaziz Al-Kuwari	Ford Fiesta RRC	1:59:38.5	12	254.92 km	14	14
8	(United Arab Emirates) Dubai International Rally (19–21 November)	3	(Qatar) Khalid Al-Suwaidi	Ford Fiesta RRC	2:03:19.1	12	254.92 km	14	14

== Championship standings ==
The 2015 MERC for Drivers points was as follows: Only drivers that had contested at least five events during the season were eligible for the championship standings.

Pos.	Driver	Vehicle	(Qatar) QAT	(Kuwait) KUW	(Iran) SHR	(Lebanon) LBN	(Cyprus) CYP	(Jordan) JOR	(Oman) OMA	(United Arab Emirates) DUB	Total
1	(Qatar) Nasser Al-Attiyah	Ford Fiesta RRC; Škoda Fabia R5	1	1	1	Ret	1	1	1		150
2	(Qatar) Abdulaziz Al-Kuwari	Ford Fiesta RRC	Ret	4	2		2	2	2	2	102
3	(United Arab Emirates) Khalid Al Qassimi	Citroën DS3 RRC	2	2	3				3	1	91
4	(Qatar) Khalid Al-Suwaidi	Ford Fiesta RRC	5	5	4	Ret	Ret	Ret	4	3	59
5	(Kuwait) Salah Bin Eidan	Mitsubishi Lancer Evo IX	4	7	6	Ret			5		36
6	(Qatar) Rashed Al Naimi	Mitsubishi Lancer Evo X Mitsubishi Lancer Evo IX	Ret	11	7	Ret	5	Ret	8		20

Key
Colour	Result
Gold	Winner
Silver	2nd place
Bronze	3rd place
Green	Points finish
Blue	Non-points finish
Blue	Non-classified finish (NC)
Purple	Did not finish (Ret)
Black	Excluded (EX)
Black	Disqualified (DSQ)
White	Did not start (DNS)
White	Cancelled (C)
Blank	Withdrew entry from the event (WD)
