= 2016 Middle East Rally Championship =

Seasons
- ← 2015 2017 →

The 2016 Middle East Rally Championship was an international rally championship sanctioned by the FIA. The championship was contested over five events held in five Middle East countries from February to October. The championship was reduced to seven rallies for 2016 season, but the end of season rallies, Oman International Rally and Dubai International Rally were cancelled.

Qatar's Nasser Al-Attiyah won his twelfth MERC championship and his sixth consecutively. Al-Attiyah won the first three rallies of the season creating an uncatchable buffer once Oman and Dubai were cancelled. Lebanese driver Rodolphe Asmar was second in the championship, securing the runner's up position with victory in Cyprus. Khalid Mohammad Al-Suwaidi was third.

== Event calendar and results ==
The 2016 MERC was as follows:

Round	Rally name	Podium finishers				Statistics			
Round	Rally name	Rank	Driver	Car	Time	Stages	Length	Starters	Finishers
1	Qatar International Rally (4–6 February)	1	(Qatar) Nasser Al-Attiyah	Škoda Fabia R5	2:03:20.5	13	241.71 km	12	6
1	Qatar International Rally (4–6 February)	2	(Qatar) Khalid Mohammad Al-Suwaidi	Ford Fiesta R5	2:09:34.6	13	241.71 km	12	6
1	Qatar International Rally (4–6 February)	3	(Qatar) Rashid Al-Naimi	Subaru WRX Sti	2:20:42.5	13	241.71 km	12	6
2	Kuwait International Rally (24–26 March)	1	(Qatar) Nasser Al-Attiyah	Škoda Fabia R5	2:08:06.1	13	209.20 km	23	19
2	Kuwait International Rally (24–26 March)	2	(Kuwait) Meshari Al-Thefiri	Mitsubishi Lancer Evolution X	2:19:31.0	13	209.20 km	23	19
2	Kuwait International Rally (24–26 March)	3	(Turkey) Yigit Alpaslan Timur	Mitsubishi Lancer Evolution X	2:20:59.2	13	209.20 km	23	19
3	Jordan Rally (5–7 May)	1	(Qatar) Nasser Al-Attiyah	Škoda Fabia R5	2:42:02.2	19	222.90 km	18	10
3	Jordan Rally (5–7 May)	2	(Qatar) Abdulaziz Al-Kuwari	Škoda Fabia R5	3:00:20.6	19	222.90 km	18	10
3	Jordan Rally (5–7 May)	3	(Qatar) Abdullah Al-Kuwari	Mitsubishi Lancer Evolution X	3:07:40.9	19	222.90 km	18	10
4	Rally of Lebanon (2–4 September)	1	(Lebanon) Tamer Ghandour	Mitsubishi Lancer Evolution X	2:12:26.3	11	209.10 km	31	22
4	Rally of Lebanon (2–4 September)	2	(Lebanon) Abdo Feghali	Škoda Fabia R5	2:15:34.6	11	209.10 km	31	22
4	Rally of Lebanon (2–4 September)	3	(Lebanon) Eddy Abou-Karam	Mitsubishi Lancer Evolution X	2:16:40.9	11	209.10 km	31	22
5	Cyprus Rally (7–9 October)	1	(Russia) Alexey Lukyanuk	Ford Fiesta R5	2:06:55.9	14	214.38 km	70	47
5	Cyprus Rally (7–9 October)	2	(Germany) Marijan Griebel	Škoda Fabia R5	2:09:08.1	14	214.38 km	70	47
5	Cyprus Rally (7–9 October)	3	(Latvia) Ralfs Sirmacis	Škoda Fabia R5	2:09:51.9	14	214.38 km	70	47
6	Oman International Rally (3–5 November)	event cancelled							
7	(United Arab Emirates) Dubai International Rally (17–19 November)	event cancelled							

== Championship standings ==
The 2016 MERC for Drivers points was as follows:

Pos.	Driver	Vehicle	(Qatar) QAT	(Kuwait) KUW	(Jordan) JOR	(Lebanon) LBN	(Cyprus) CYP	Total
1	(Qatar) Nasser Al-Attiyah	Škoda Fabia R5	1	1	1	Ret		123
2	(Lebanon) Rodolphe Asmar	Mitsubishi Lancer Evolution X	5	7	6	4	1	80
3	(Qatar) Khalid Mohammad Al-Suwaidi	Ford Fiesta R5	2	5	4	7	Ret	77
4	(Qatar) Abdullah Al-Kuwari	Mitsubishi Lancer Evolution X	4	8	3	19	4	73
5	(Qatar) Rashed Al Naimi	Subaru WRX Sti	3	Ret	8	12	3	64
6	(Qatar) Khalifa Saleh Al-Attiyah	Subaru WRX Sti	Ret	4	Ret			22
7	(Turkey) Vedat Diker	Mitsubishi Lancer Evolution X	Ret	9	Ret			4
8	(Kuwait) Meshari Al-Thefiri	Mitsubishi Lancer Evolution X		2	Ret			3

Key
Colour	Result
Gold	Winner
Silver	2nd place
Bronze	3rd place
Green	Points finish
Blue	Non-points finish
Blue	Non-classified finish (NC)
Purple	Did not finish (Ret)
Black	Excluded (EX)
Black	Disqualified (DSQ)
White	Did not start (DNS)
White	Cancelled (C)
Blank	Withdrew entry from the event (WD)
