= 2013 Middle East Rally Championship =

2013 Middle East Rally season

Seasons
- ← 2012 2014 →

The 2013 Middle East Rally Championship season is an international rally championship sanctioned by the FIA. The championship is contested over seven events held in seven countries across the Middle East region, running from January to December.

Reigning champion Nasser Al-Attiyah successfully retained the championship with an event in hand after taking victories in Qatar, Kuwait, Jordan and Cyprus and finishing second in Lebanon. He would go on to win Dubai as well. Al-Attiyah scored more than double the points of second placed driver, Khalid Al-Qassimi. Al-Qassimi finished second in Qatar, Kuwait and Cyprus and finished third in Jordan. Third place went to Abdulaziz Al-Kuwari who finished third in Qatar, Kuwait and Cyprus as well as a fourth place in Jordan.

The only driver to defeat Al-Attiyah in a rally this year, Roger Feghali who won in Lebanon, is not a championship competitor.

== Race calendar and results ==
The 2013 MERC is as follows:

Round	Rally name	Podium finishers				Statistics			
Round	Rally name	Rank	Driver	Car	Time	Stages	Length	Starters	Finishers
1	Qatar International Rally (25–26 January)	1	(Qatar) Nasser Al-Attiyah	Ford Fiesta RRC	2:16:47.2	12	264.38 km	18	14
1	Qatar International Rally (25–26 January)	2	(United Arab Emirates) Khalid Al-Qassimi	Citroën DS3 RRC	2:17:42.9	12	264.38 km	18	14
1	Qatar International Rally (25–26 January)	3	(Qatar) Abdulaziz Al-Kuwari	Ford Fiesta RRC	2:21:02.2	12	264.38 km	18	14
2	Kuwait International Rally (21–23 March)	1	(Qatar) Nasser Al-Attiyah	Ford Fiesta RRC	2:10:25.3	12	242.26 km	25	16
2	Kuwait International Rally (21–23 March)	2	(United Arab Emirates) Khalid Al-Qassimi	Citroën DS3 RRC	2:11:39.2	12	242.26 km	25	16
2	Kuwait International Rally (21–23 March)	3	(Qatar) Abdulaziz Al-Kuwari	Ford Fiesta RRC	2:14:50.1	12	242.26 km	25	16
3	Jordan Rally (9–11 May)	1	(Qatar) Nasser Al-Attiyah	Ford Fiesta RRC	2:51:53.1	16	256.40 km	26	18
3	Jordan Rally (9–11 May)	2	(Lebanon) Roger Feghali	Ford Fiesta RRC	2:53:35.3	16	256.40 km	26	18
3	Jordan Rally (9–11 May)	3	(United Arab Emirates) Khalid Al-Qassimi	Citroën DS3 RRC	2:53:53.7	16	256.40 km	26	18
4	Rally of Lebanon (6–8 September)	1	(Lebanon) Roger Feghali	Ford Fiesta RRC	2:33:27.6	13	256.77 km	36	22
4	Rally of Lebanon (6–8 September)	2	(Qatar) Nasser Al-Attiyah	Ford Fiesta RRC	2:33:57.7	13	256.77 km	36	22
4	Rally of Lebanon (6–8 September)	3	(Lebanon) Abdo Feghali	Mini Cooper S2000	2:39:32.6	13	256.77 km	36	22
-	(Syria) Syrian International Rally (3–5 October)	event cancelled							
5	Cyprus Rally (11–13 October)	1	(Qatar) Nasser Al-Attiyah	Ford Fiesta RRC	2:35:17.6	17	242.18 km	28	13
5	Cyprus Rally (11–13 October)	2	(United Arab Emirates) Khalid Al-Qassimi	Citroën DS3 RRC	2:38:09.4	17	242.18 km	28	13
5	Cyprus Rally (11–13 October)	3	(Qatar) Abdulaziz Al-Kuwari	Ford Fiesta RRC	2:38:14.1	17	242.18 km	28	13
6	(United Arab Emirates) Dubai International Rally (28–30 November)	1	(Qatar) Nasser Al-Attiyah	Ford Fiesta RRC	2:01:11.9	12	264.20 km	20	13
6	(United Arab Emirates) Dubai International Rally (28–30 November)	2	(Qatar) Misfer Al-Marri	Ford Fiesta RRC	2:06:45.5	12	264.20 km	20	13
6	(United Arab Emirates) Dubai International Rally (28–30 November)	3	(United Arab Emirates) Abdullah Al-Qassimi	Ford Fiesta RRC	2:07:40.3	12	264.20 km	20	13

== Championship standings ==
The 2013 MERC for Drivers points is as follows:

Position	Driver	Vehicle	(Qatar) QAT	(Kuwait) KUW	(Jordan) JOR	(Lebanon) LBN	(Cyprus) CYP	(United Arab Emirates) DUB	Total
1	(Qatar) Nasser Al-Attiyah	Ford Fiesta RRC	1	1	1	2	1	1	143
2	(United Arab Emirates) Khalid Al-Qassimi	Citroën DS3 RRC	2	2	3		2	Ret	69
3	(Qatar) Abdulaziz Al-Kuwari	Ford Fiesta RRC	3	3	4		3		57
4	(United Arab Emirates) Abdullah Al-Qassimi	Ford Fiesta RRC	5	5	5			3	30
5	(Saudi Arabia) Yazeed Al-Rajhi	Ford Fiesta RRC	6	4			Ret	Ret	20
6	(Jordan) Ala'a Rasheed	Ford Fiesta RRC	Ret	Ret		12	7	4	18
7	(Qatar) Abdullah Al-Kuwari	Mitsubishi Lancer Evo X	7	Ret	Ret	16	8	8	14
8	(United Arab Emirates) Bader Al-Jabri	Subaru Impreza WRX STi	8	Ret	10			7	11
9	(Jordan) Zaid Dahshan	Mitsubishi Lancer Evo X	Ret	10	8	17	Ret		4
9	(Kuwait) Meshari Al-Thefiri	Mitsubishi Lancer Evo IX; Mitsubishi Lancer Evo X	11	8	13	Ret	Ret		4
11	(United Arab Emirates) Mohamed Al-Sahlawi	Citroën DS3 R3T	10	12	18			9	3
12	(United Arab Emirates) Mohamed Al-Mutawaa	Citroën DS3 R3T	Ret	13	17			10	1

Key
Colour	Result
Gold	Winner
Silver	2nd place
Bronze	3rd place
Green	Points finish
Blue	Non-points finish
Blue	Non-classified finish (NC)
Purple	Did not finish (Ret)
Black	Excluded (EX)
Black	Disqualified (DSQ)
White	Did not start (DNS)
White	Cancelled (C)
Blank	Withdrew entry from the event (WD)
