= 2014 Middle East Rally Championship =

2014 Middle East Rally season

Seasons
- ← 2013 2015 →

The 2014 Middle East Rally Championship season was an international rally championship sanctioned by the FIA. The championship was contested over six events held in six countries across the Middle East region, running from February to November.

Reigning champion Nasser Al-Attiyah defended his championship, winning four of the six rallies to be held, but the title was not decided until several days after the event. Al-Attiyah's fourth victory – at the Dubai International Rally – had originally been the first of the season for Khalid Al-Qassimi; Al-Qassimi had won the event by 0.3 seconds, and the championship title by a single point. Al-Attiyah protested the results, claiming that Al-Qassimi had violated designated driving regulations. Event officials rejected Al-Attiyah's protest, but the FIA's International Court of Appeal accepted a subsequent protest. Al-Qassimi was given a 30-second post-event penalty, and his one-point title-winning margin, became a deficit of thirteen to Al-Attiyah. Third place in the championship went to Abdulaziz Al-Kuwari, who won the Cyprus Rally, which was held alongside the European Rally Championship event. The season's only other winner was Nicolas Amiouni, who won his home event in Lebanon.

== Event calendar and results ==
The 2014 MERC was as follows:

Round	Rally name	Podium finishers				Statistics			
Round	Rally name	Rank	Driver	Car	Time	Stages	Length	Starters	Finishers
1	Qatar International Rally (20–22 February)	1	(Qatar) Nasser Al-Attiyah	Ford Fiesta RRC	2:13:11.4	12	264.51 km	19	14
1	Qatar International Rally (20–22 February)	2	(Qatar) Abdulaziz Al-Kuwari	Ford Fiesta RRC	2:13:41.5	12	264.51 km	19	14
1	Qatar International Rally (20–22 February)	3	(United Arab Emirates) Khalid Al-Qassimi	Citroën DS3 RRC	2:16:04.6	12	264.51 km	19	14
2	Kuwait International Rally (20–22 March)	1	(Qatar) Nasser Al-Attiyah	Ford Fiesta RRC	2:09:38.4	13	222.20 km	22	16
2	Kuwait International Rally (20–22 March)	2	(United Arab Emirates) Khalid Al-Qassimi	Citroën DS3 RRC	2:10:05.9	13	222.20 km	22	16
2	Kuwait International Rally (20–22 March)	3	(Saudi Arabia) Yazeed Al-Rajhi	Ford Fiesta RRC	2:11:50.7	13	222.20 km	22	16
3	Jordan Rally (1–3 May)	1	(Qatar) Nasser Al-Attiyah	Ford Fiesta RRC	3:00:53.2	21	273.00 km	25	19
3	Jordan Rally (1–3 May)	2	(United Arab Emirates) Khalid Al-Qassimi	Citroën DS3 RRC	3:02:55.4	21	273.00 km	25	19
3	Jordan Rally (1–3 May)	3	(United Arab Emirates) Abdullah Al-Qassimi	Ford Fiesta RRC	3:15:26.7	21	273.00 km	25	19
4	Rally of Lebanon (29–31 August)	1	(Lebanon) Nicolas Amiouni	Mitsubishi Lancer Evolution X	2:39:47.5	13	245.66 km	30	21
4	Rally of Lebanon (29–31 August)	2	(Lebanon) Rodrigue Rahi	Mitsubishi Lancer Evolution IX	2:41:15.9	13	245.66 km	30	21
4	Rally of Lebanon (29–31 August)	3	(Qatar) Abdulaziz Al-Kuwari	Ford Fiesta RRC	2:43:03.0	13	245.66 km	30	21
5	Cyprus Rally (19–21 September)	1	(Qatar) Abdulaziz Al-Kuwari	Ford Fiesta RRC	3:05:14.9	15	232.02 km	8	7
5	Cyprus Rally (19–21 September)	2	(United Arab Emirates) Khalid Al-Qassimi	Citroën DS3 RRC	3:05:50.1	15	232.02 km	8	7
5	Cyprus Rally (19–21 September)	3	(Qatar) Abdullah Al-Kuwari	Ford Fiesta R5	3:30:26.9	15	232.02 km	8	7
6	(United Arab Emirates) Dubai International Rally (27–29 November)	1	(Qatar) Nasser Al-Attiyah	Ford Fiesta RRC	1:59:27.8	12	251.00 km	18	16
6	(United Arab Emirates) Dubai International Rally (27–29 November)	2	(United Arab Emirates) Khalid Al-Qassimi	Citroën DS3 RRC	1:59:57.5	12	251.00 km	18	16
6	(United Arab Emirates) Dubai International Rally (27–29 November)	3	(Qatar) Abdulaziz Al-Kuwari	Ford Fiesta RRC	2:03:51.5	12	251.00 km	18	16

== Championship standings ==
The 2014 MERC for Drivers points was as follows:

Pos.	Driver	Vehicle	(Qatar) QAT	(Kuwait) KUW	(Jordan) JOR	(Lebanon) LBN	(Cyprus) CYP	(United Arab Emirates) DUB	Total
1	(Qatar) Nasser Al-Attiyah	Ford Fiesta RRC	1	1	1		Ret	1	100
2	(United Arab Emirates) Khalid Al-Qassimi	Citroën DS3 RRC	3	2	2		2	2	87
3	(Qatar) Abdulaziz Al-Kuwari	Ford Fiesta RRC	2	6		3	1	3	81
4	(Qatar) Abdullah Al-Kuwari	Ford Fiesta R5	5	7	Ret	6	3	6	47
5	(United Arab Emirates) Abdullah Al-Qassimi	Ford Fiesta RRC		4	3			5	37
6	(Saudi Arabia) Yazeed Al-Rajhi	Ford Fiesta RRC	4	3					27
7	(Lebanon) Nicolas Amiouni	Mitsubishi Lancer Evo X				1			25
8	(Kuwait) Salah Bin Eidan	Ford Fiesta R5	Ret	5	5				20
8	(Qatar) Khalifa Saleh Al-Attiyah	Mitsubishi Lancer Evo X Mitsubishi Lancer Evo IX		8			5	7	20
10	(Lebanon) Rodrigue Rahi	Mitsubishi Lancer Evo IX				2			18
11	(Kuwait) Meshari Al-Thefiri	Mitsubishi Lancer Evo X	9	12	10		4		15
12	(United Arab Emirates) Mohamed Al-Mutawaa	Citroën DS3 R3T	6	9	9			9	14
13	(Jordan) Marouf Abu Samra	Škoda Fabia S2000			4				12
13	(Lebanon) Nabil Abdelhak	Mitsubishi Lancer Evo X				4			12
13	(Qatar) Khalid Mohammad Al-Suwaidi	Ford Fiesta RRC						4	12
16	(United Arab Emirates) Mohamed Al-Sahlawi	Citroën DS3 R3T	7	10	17			8	11
17	(Lebanon) Bassel Abou-Hamdan	Citroën DS3 R3T				5			10
17	(Jordan) Ala'a Rasheed	Ford Fiesta RRC	8		7				10
19	(Germany) Edith Weiss	Mitsubishi Lancer Evo IX					6	15	8
19	(Jordan) Husam Salem	Mitsubishi Lancer Evo VIII			6				8
21	(Lebanon) Nehme Elie	Renault Clio R3				7			6
21	(Qatar) Nada Zaidan	Subaru Impreza STi N12					7		6
23	(Jordan) Ala Khalifeh	Ford Fiesta R5			8				4
23	(Lebanon) "Matador"	Mitsubishi Lancer Evo VIII				8			4
25	(Lebanon) Eddy Abou-Karam	Mitsubishi Lancer Evo X				9			2
26	(United Arab Emirates) Mansoor Yahya Bel Helei	Citroën DS3 R3T	10	13	15			13	1
26	(Lebanon) Bechara Bechir	Renault Clio RS				10			1
26	(United Arab Emirates) Rashid Al-Ketbi	Ford Fiesta R5						10	1

Key
Colour	Result
Gold	Winner
Silver	2nd place
Bronze	3rd place
Green	Points finish
Blue	Non-points finish
Blue	Non-classified finish (NC)
Purple	Did not finish (Ret)
Black	Excluded (EX)
Black	Disqualified (DSQ)
White	Did not start (DNS)
White	Cancelled (C)
Blank	Withdrew entry from the event (WD)
