= Qatar International Rally =

The Qatar International Rally (known previously as Qatar Rally, also known as International Rally of Qatar) is an international rallying event held near the Qatari capital Doha. The rally, a gravel and sand event, dates back into the 1970s and has long been one of the cornerstone events of the Middle East Rally Championship and is one of two events (along with Dubai International Rally) to have been held in every year of the MERC.

The rally has had a group of multiple winners with local Nasser Al-Attiyah taking thirteen victories in a fourteen-year period. Emirati driver Mohammed Ben Sulayem has claimed nine victories and Qatari Saeed Al-Hajri has had five wins.

== List of previous winners ==
List of winners sourced in part from:

Year	Winner	Car
1983	(Qatar) Saeed Al-Hajri	Porsche 911 SC
1984	(Qatar) Saeed Al-Hajri	Porsche 911 SC
1985	(Qatar) Saeed Al-Hajri	Porsche 911 SC
1986	(Sweden) Björn Waldegård	Toyota Celica TCT
1987	(Qatar) Saeed Al-Hajri	Porsche 911 SC
1988	(United Arab Emirates) Mohammed Ben Sulayem	Toyota Celica TCT
1989	(Qatar) Saeed Al-Hajri	Ford Sierra RS Cosworth
1990	(United Arab Emirates) Mohammed Ben Sulayem	Toyota Celica GT-Four
1991	(United Arab Emirates) Mohammed Ben Sulayem	Toyota Celica GT-Four
1992	(Qatar) Saeed Al-Hajri	Toyota Celica GT-Four
1993	(Qatar) Nasser Khalifa Al-Attiyah	Toyota Celica GT-Four
1994	(United Arab Emirates) Suhail Al-Maktoum	Toyota Celica GT-Four
1995	(United Arab Emirates) Khalifa Al-Motawi	Toyota Celica GT-Four
1996	(United Arab Emirates) Mohammed Ben Sulayem	Ford Escort RS Cosworth
1997	(United Arab Emirates) Mohammed Ben Sulayem	Ford Escort WRC
1998	(United Arab Emirates) Mohammed Ben Sulayem	Ford Escort WRC
1999	(Oman) Nizar Al-Shanfari	Mitsubishi Lancer Evo V
2000	(United Arab Emirates) Mohammed Ben Sulayem	Ford Focus WRC
2001	(United Arab Emirates) Mohammed Ben Sulayem	Ford Focus WRC
2002	(United Arab Emirates) Mohammed Ben Sulayem	Ford Focus WRC
2003	(Qatar) Nasser Al-Attiyah	Subaru Impreza WRC
2004	(Qatar) Nasser Al-Attiyah	Subaru Impreza WRX STi
2005	(Qatar) Nasser Al-Attiyah	Subaru Impreza WRX STi
2006	(Qatar) Nasser Al-Attiyah	Subaru Impreza WRX STi
2007	(Qatar) Nasser Al-Attiyah	Subaru Impreza WRX STi
2008	(Qatar) Nasser Al-Attiyah	Subaru Impreza WRX STi
2009	(Qatar) Nasser Al-Attiyah	Mitsubishi Lancer Evo X
2010	(Qatar) Nasser Al-Attiyah	Ford Fiesta S2000
2011	(Qatar) Nasser Al-Attiyah	Ford Fiesta S2000
2012	(Qatar) Abdulaziz Al-Kuwari	Mini Cooper S2000
2013	(Qatar) Nasser Al-Attiyah	Ford Fiesta RRC
2014	(Qatar) Nasser Al-Attiyah	Ford Fiesta RRC
2015	(Qatar) Nasser Al-Attiyah	Ford Fiesta RRC
2016	(Qatar) Nasser Al-Attiyah	Škoda Fabia R5
2017	(Qatar) Rashid Al-Naimi	Subaru WRX Sti
2018	(Czech Republic) Vojtěch Štajf	Škoda Fabia R5
2019	(Qatar) Nasser Al-Attiyah	Volkswagen Polo GTI R5
2021	(Qatar) Nasser Al-Attiyah	Volkswagen Polo GTI R5
2022	(Qatar) Nasser Al-Attiyah	Volkswagen Polo GTI R5
2023	(Qatar) Nasser Al-Attiyah	Volkswagen Polo GTI R5
2024	(France) Pierre-Louis Loubet	Škoda Fabia RS Rally2
