= Saeed Al-Hajri =

Saeed Al-Hajri may refer to:

- Saeed Al-Hajri (bowler), Qatari ten-pin bowler
- Saeed Al-Hajri (rally driver) (born 1950), Qatari rally driver
