= Middle East Rally Championship =

Rally championship series held in the Middle East

- Category: R5; Rally2; Group N
- Region: Middle East
- Inaugural season: 1984
- Drivers' champion: (Qatar) Nasser Al-Attiyah

The Middle East Rally Championship (MERC) is a motor rally championship run under the auspices of the FIA.

== History ==
First held in 1984 the championship encompasses a series of rallies held across Western Asia. The championship has featured long-running events like Rally of Lebanon, Rally Oman and the Troodos Rally in Cyprus as well as World Rally Championship event Jordan Rally. Many of the rallies in the region pre-date national independence, mostly from the United Kingdom.

The championship has been dominated by Nasser Al-Attiyah who has won 20 titles.

The championship features events in Qatar, Kuwait, Iran, Lebanon, Cyprus, Jordan, Oman and the United Arab Emirates. The championship has also visited Bahrain, Syria and Saudi Arabia.

== List of events ==
- Qatar International Rally (1984–present)
- Kuwait International Rally (1984–1985, 1987–1989, 1995–1996, 2009–2016, 2018–present)
- Bahrain International Rally (1984, 2000–2002, 2004–2005)
- Jordan Rally (1984–1988, 1990, 1992–present)
- Oman International Rally (1984–1988, 1990–1994, 1998, 2004–2007, 2015)
- Dubai International Rally, United Arab Emirates (1984–1988, 1990–1995, 1997–2015)
- Rally of Lebanon, (1987–1988, 1991–2004, 2006–present)
- UAE International Rally, United Arab Emirates (1989, 1995–2001, 2004–2006)
- Tour of Cyprus, (1998–1999)
- Troodos Rally, Cyprus, (2000–2009, 2011)
- Syria International Rally, (2001–2005, 2007–2010)
- Cyprus Rally, (2007–2008, 2010, 2012–present)
- Sharqia Rally, Saudi Arabia, (2010)
- Shiraz Rally, Iran, (2015–2017)
- Rally Saudi Arabia (2026)

== Champions ==
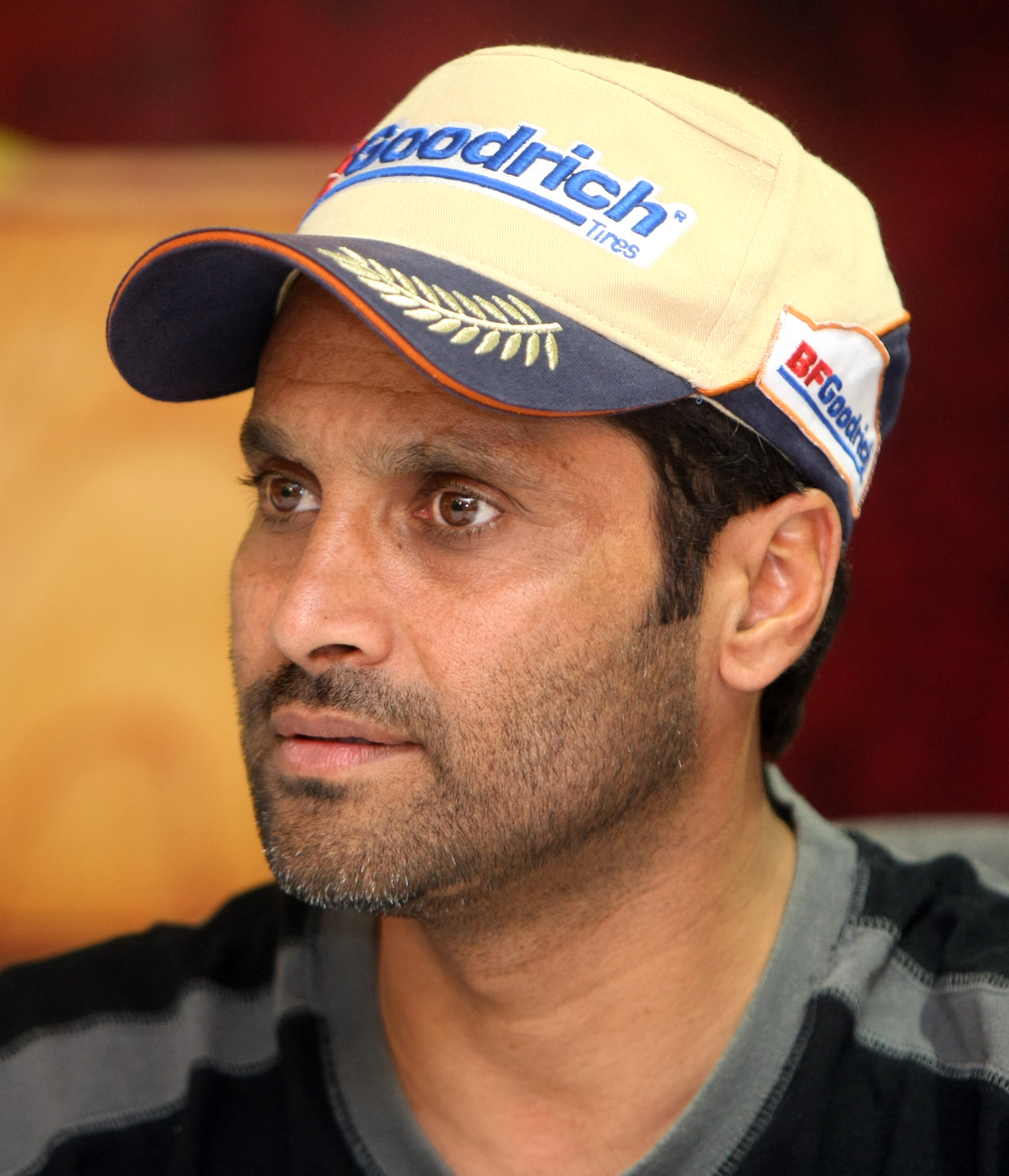
Qatari driver Nasser Al-Attiyah won the championship 20 times

Year	Driver	Car
1984	(Qatar) Saeed Al-Hajri	Porsche 911 SC RS
1985	(Qatar) Saeed Al-Hajri (2)	Porsche 911 SC RS
1986	(United Arab Emirates) Mohammed Ben Sulayem	Toyota Celica Twin-Cam Turbo
1987	(United Arab Emirates) Mohammed Ben Sulayem	Toyota Celica Twin-Cam Turbo
1988	(United Arab Emirates) Mohammed Ben Sulayem	Toyota Celica Twin-Cam Turbo
1989	(United Arab Emirates) Mohammed Ben Sulayem	Toyota Celica GT-Four ST165
1990	(United Arab Emirates) Mohammed Ben Sulayem	Toyota Celica GT-Four ST165
1991	(United Arab Emirates) Mohammed Ben Sulayem	Toyota Celica GT-Four ST165
1992	(Saudi Arabia) Mamdouh Khayat	Lancia Delta HF Integrale
1993	(Qatar) Hamed Al-Thani	Mitsubishi Galant VR4
1994	(United Arab Emirates) Mohammed Ben Sulayem	Ford Escort RS Cosworth
1995	(Saudi Arabia) Abdullah Bakhashab	Ford Escort RS Cosworth
1996	(United Arab Emirates) Mohammed Ben Sulayem	Ford Escort RS Cosworth
1997	(United Arab Emirates) Mohammed Ben Sulayem	Ford Escort RS Cosworth
1998	(United Arab Emirates) Mohammed Ben Sulayem	Ford Escort WRC
1999	(United Arab Emirates) Mohammed Ben Sulayem	Ford Focus RS WRC
2000	(United Arab Emirates) Mohammed Ben Sulayem	Ford Focus RS WRC
2001	(United Arab Emirates) Mohammed Ben Sulayem	Ford Focus RS WRC
2002	(United Arab Emirates) Mohammed Ben Sulayem (14)	Ford Focus RS WRC; Subaru Impreza WRC
2003	(Qatar) Nasser Al-Attiyah	Subaru Impreza WRC
2004	(United Arab Emirates) Khalid Al Qassimi	Subaru Impreza WRX STI
2005	(Qatar) Nasser Al-Attiyah	Subaru Impreza WRX STI
2006	(Qatar) Nasser Al-Attiyah	Subaru Impreza WRX STI
2007	(Qatar) Nasser Al-Attiyah	Subaru Impreza WRX STI
2008	(Qatar) Nasser Al-Attiyah	Subaru Impreza WRX STI
2009	(Qatar) Nasser Al-Attiyah	Subaru Impreza WRX STI; Mitsubishi Lancer Evo X
2010	(Qatar) Misfer Al Marri	Subaru Impreza WRX STI
2011	(Qatar) Nasser Al-Attiyah	Ford Fiesta S2000
2012	(Qatar) Nasser Al-Attiyah	Ford Fiesta RRC; Peugeot 207 S2000
2013	(Qatar) Nasser Al-Attiyah	Ford Fiesta RRC
2014	(Qatar) Nasser Al-Attiyah	Ford Fiesta RRC
2015	(Qatar) Nasser Al-Attiyah	Ford Fiesta RRC
2016	(Qatar) Nasser Al-Attiyah	Škoda Fabia R5
2017	(Qatar) Nasser Al-Attiyah	Ford Fiesta R5
2018	(Qatar) Nasser Al-Attiyah	Ford Fiesta R5
2019	(Qatar) Nasser Al-Attiyah	Volkswagen Polo GTI R5
2020	(Qatar) Nasser Al-Attiyah	Volkswagen Polo GTI R5
2021	(Qatar) Nasser Al-Attiyah	Volkswagen Polo GTI R5
2022	(Qatar) Nasser Al-Attiyah	Volkswagen Polo GTI R5
2023	(Qatar) Nasser Al-Attiyah (Oman) Abdullah Al-Rawahi (Note: The 2023 championship was awarded to both Nasser Al-Attiyah and Abdullah Al-Rawahi, after a perfect tie between the two could not be settled by a six-man FIA committee.)	Volkswagen Polo GTI R5; Škoda Fabia Rally2 evo
2024	(Qatar) Abdulaziz Al-Kuwari	Škoda Fabia RS Rally2
2025	(Qatar) Nasser Al-Attiyah (20)	Škoda Fabia RS Rally2

Footnotes

== Rally winners ==
After the 2025 season:

Driver	Wins
(Qatar) Nasser Al-Attiyah	90
(United Arab Emirates) Mohammed Ben Sulayem	60
(Lebanon) Roger Feghali	17
(Qatar) Saeed Al-Hajri	11
(United Arab Emirates) Khalid Al Qassimi	8
(Cyprus) Andreas Tsouloftas	4
(Oman) Abdullah Al-Rawahi	4
(Saudi Arabia) Abdullah Bakhashab	3
(Sweden) Björn Waldegård	3
(Lebanon) Jean-Pierre Nasrallah	3
(Saudi Arabia) Yazeed Al-Rajhi	3
(United Arab Emirates) Suhail bin Maktoum	2
(United Arab Emirates) Khalifa Al-Mutaiwi	2
(Lebanon) Michel Saleh	2
(Qatar) Abdulaziz Al Kuwari	2
(Cyprus) Charalambos Thimotheou	2
(Qatar) Khalid Al Suwaidi	2
(Jordan) Amjad Farrah	1
(Cyprus) Andreas Peratikos	1
(Cyprus) Chris Thomas	1
(Lebanon) Samir Ghanem	1
(United Arab Emirates) Abdullah Al-Qassimi	1
(Qatar) Abbas Al-Motaiwi	1
(Qatar) Nasser Khalifa Al-Attiyah	1
(Qatar) Hamed Bin Eid Al-Thani	1
(Lebanon) Maurice Sehnaoui	1
(Lebanon) Tony Georgiou	1
(Italy) Alex Fiorio	1
(Italy) Piero Liatti	1
(United Kingdom) Russell Brookes	1
(France) Alain Oreille	1
(Oman) Nizar Shanfari	1
(Cyprus) Nicos Thomas	1
(United Arab Emirates) Rashed El-Ketbi	1
(Lebanon) Nicolas Amiouni	1
(Lebanon) Tamer Ghandour	1
(Lebanon) Rodolphe Asmar	1
(Qatar) Rashid El-Naimi	1
(France) Pierre-Louis Loubet	1
(Czechoslovakia) Vojtěch Štajf	1

== Wins per nationality ==
Count as after Cyprus 2023

Driver	Wins
Qatar	100
United Arab Emirates	74
Lebanon	27
Cyprus	9
Saudi Arabia	6
Oman	5
Sweden	3
Italy	2
Jordan	1
France	1
United Kingdom	1
Czech Republic	1
