= Oman International Rally =

The Oman International Rally (known originally as the Rally Oman, is an international rallying event held to the south and south-east of the Omani capital of Muscat. The rally is run by the Oman Automobile Association.

The rally, first held in 1979, held on gravel roads and sand for the most part, has consistently been part of the Middle East Rally Championship (MERC) and the Gulf Rally Challenge that preceded it, as well as being a mainstay of the Oman Rally Championship. The first two events were won by Swedish driver Harry Källström before Qatari driver Saeed Al-Hajri became the first Arabian driver to win in 1981. After the rallies most recent interruption it was re-introduced as a round of the Omani championship in 2013 with MERC candidate status following in 2014. The rally rejoined the MERC officially in 2015.

Emirati driver Mohammed Ben Sulayem is the most successful driver in the events history having won the event six times between 1986 and 1998. Qatari driver Nasser Al-Attiyah won four consecutive rallies from 2003 to 2006.

== List of previous winners ==
List of winners sourced in part from:

Year	Winner	Car
1979	(Sweden) Harry Källström	Datsun 160J
1980	(Sweden) Harry Källström	Datsun 160J
1981	(Qatar) Saeed Al-Hajri	Opel Ascona
1982	(United Kingdom) Chris Walles	Datsun 200SX
1983	(United Kingdom) Chris Walles	Datsun 200SX
1984	(Qatar) Saeed Al-Hajri	Porsche 911 SC
1985	(Qatar) Saeed Al-Hajri	Porsche 911 SC
1986	(United Arab Emirates) Mohammed Ben Sulayem	Toyota Celica TCT
1987	(United Arab Emirates) Mohammed Ben Sulayem	Audi Quattro A2
1988	(Sweden) Björn Waldegård	Toyota Celica GT-Four
1989	Not held	
1990	(United Arab Emirates) Mohammed Ben Sulayem	Toyota Celica GT-Four
1991	(United Arab Emirates) Mohammed Ben Sulayem	Toyota Celica GT-Four
1992	(Lebanon) Tony Georgiou	Toyota Celica GT-Four
1993	(Lebanon) Michel Saleh	Toyota Celica GT-Four
1994	(United Arab Emirates) Mohammed Ben Sulayem	Ford Escort RS Cosworth
1995 - 1997	Not held	
1998	(United Arab Emirates) Mohammed Ben Sulayem	Ford Escort WRC
1999 - 2003	Not held	
2003	(Qatar) Nasser Al-Attiyah	Mitsubishi Lancer RS Evo VII
2004	(Qatar) Nasser Al-Attiyah	Subaru Impreza WRX STi
2005	(Qatar) Nasser Al-Attiyah	Subaru Impreza WRX STi
2006	(Qatar) Nasser Al-Attiyah	Subaru Impreza WRX STi
2007	(United Arab Emirates) Khalid Al-Qassimi	Subaru Impreza WRX STi
2008 - 2012	Not held	
2013	(United Arab Emirates) Abdullah Al-Qassimi	Mitsubishi Lancer RS Evo IX
2014	(Qatar) Abdulaziz Al-Kuwari	Ford Fiesta RRC
