= Shiraz Rally =

The Shiraz Rally (also known as Shiraz International Rally) is an international rallying event held at Persepolis, near Shiraz, the capital of the Fars province in the Islamic Republic of Iran. The rally is a gravel and sand event run by the Motorcycle and Automobile Federation of the Islamic Republic of Iran (MAFIRI). The event was first held as a candidate event in 2014 before becoming a round of the Middle East Rally Championship (MERC) in 2015. The rally is the first international motorsport event to be held in Iran since the 1979 revolution.

The first event, held in late September, attracted approximately 30 entries, mostly locally based Peugeots and Kias. It was won by Lebanese driver Roger Feghali with the only other international team, Qatari driver Khalifa Al-Attiyah second. Both teams ran Mitsubishi Lancer Evolutions. Twelve other teams finished, all bar two of them Peugeots. The rally had been cut short after an accident resulted in the death of Iranian co-driver Arash Ramin Yekta.

The first MERC rally, held less than eight months later, was won by defending champion Nasser Al-Attiyah ahead of countryman Abdulaziz Al Kuwari and Emirati driver Khalid Al Qassimi.

After skipping 2016 the rally returned for 2017 and was won again by Al-Attiyah but has not been held since.

== List of previous winners ==
Year	Winner	Car
2014	(Lebanon) Roger Feghali	Mitsubishi Lancer RS Evo X
2015	(Qatar) Nasser Al-Attiyah	Ford Fiesta RRC
2016	Not held	
2017	(Qatar) Nasser Al-Attiyah	Ford Fiesta R5
