= FIA World Motor Sport Council =

Governing body of motor sports

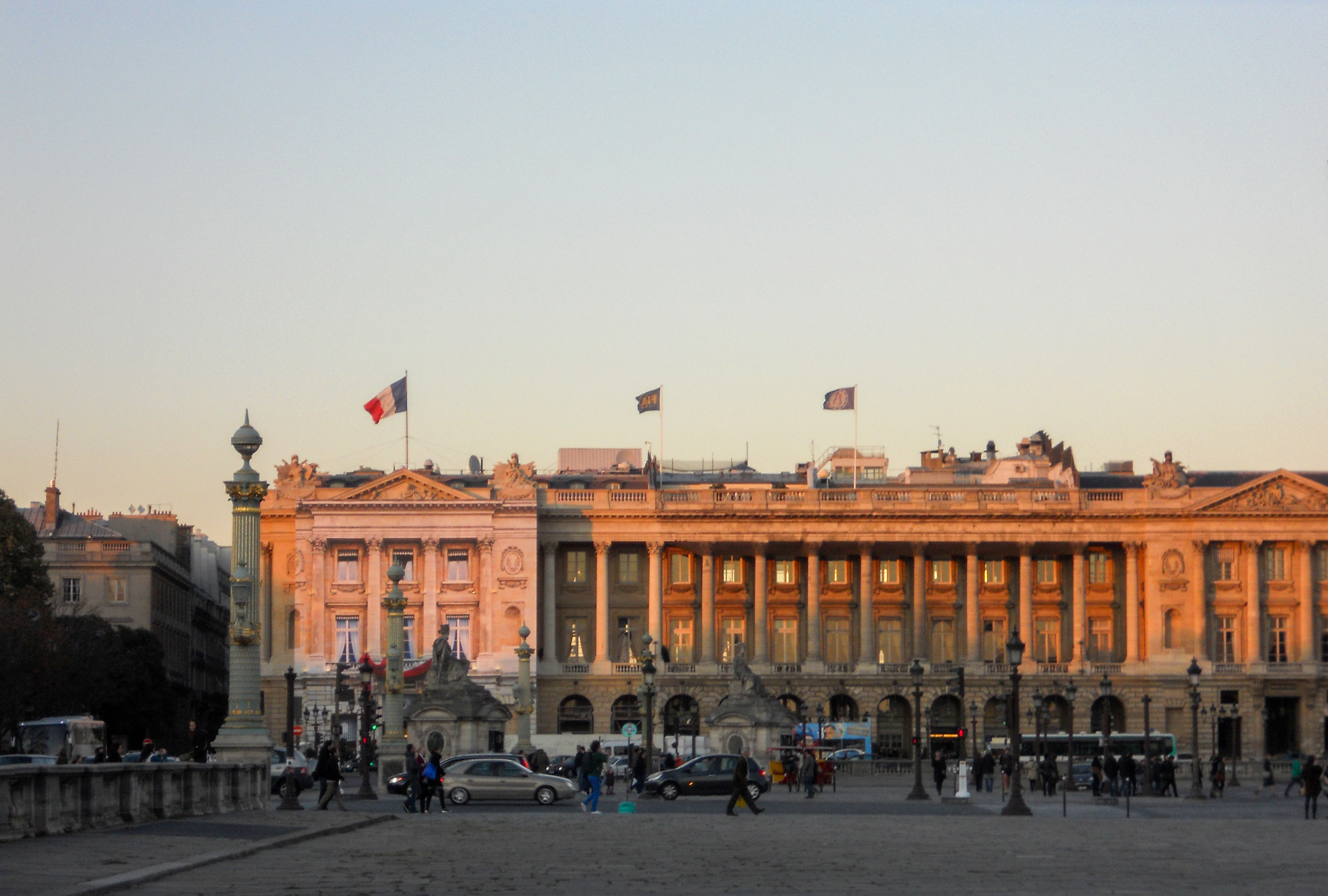
- FIA Headquarters (2011)
- Abbreviation: FIA WMSC
- Formation: 20 June 1904; 122 years ago (as AIACR)
- Type: Governing body for Motor sport
- Legal status: Voluntary association
- Purpose: Motorists' issues Motorsports
- Headquarters: Place de la Concorde
- Location: Paris, France
- Region served: International
- Members: 28 members
- Official language: English; French; Italian
- President: Mohammed bin Sulayem
- Main organ: Fédération Internationale de l'Automobile
- Affiliations: Fédération Internationale de l'Automobile; FIA Institute; FIA Foundation; International Olympic Committee; World Health Organization; Organisation for Economic Co-operation and Development; World Tourism Organization; UN Environment Programme
- Website: Official website

The World Motor Sport Council (WMSC) is a part of the governance structure of the Fédération Internationale de l'Automobile. It has responsibility for all aspects of international motor sport. It meets at least three times a year to decide on rules, regulations, safety and development of motor sport at every level from karting to Formula One.

The World Motor Sport Council, in its administration of international motor sport, prioritises improvements in safety and environmental standards across all forms of the sport, adopts common regulations across the various series, and nurtures motor sport's roots by developing all forms of the sport, especially among the youth and in developing countries.

The World Motor Sport Council's membership is chosen by the FIA General Assembly, which contains representatives from national motorsport authorities (ASNs) throughout the world. It is one of two FIA World Councils; the other council is responsible for administrating "issues affecting the automobile in society (The World Council for Automobile Mobility and Tourism (WCAMT)).

The World Motor Sport Council meets a minimum of three times a year to consider proposals from specialist FIA Commissions and subsidiaries.

== Member list and Constituency (2022–term) ==
Position	Representing	Member
President	FIA President	(United Arab Emirates) Mohammed bin Sulayem
Deputy President	FIA Deputy President for Sport	(United Kingdom) Malcolm Wilson
Vice-presidents	Bahrain	(Bahrain) Sheikh Abdulla Bin Isa Al Khalifa
Vice-presidents	Spain	(Spain) Manuel Avino
Vice-presidents	Costa Rica	(Costa Rica) Daniel Coen
Vice-presidents	Brazil	(Brazil) Fabiana Ecclestone
Vice-presidents	Singapore	(Singapore) Lung-Nien Lee
Vice-presidents	Sweden	(Sweden) Anna Nordkvist
Vice-presidents	Mozambique	(Mozambique) Rodrigo Rocha
Titular members	Saudi Arabia	(Saudi Arabia) HRH Prince Khalid Bin Sultan Al Faisal Al Saud
Titular members	Monaco	(Monaco) Eric Barrabino
Titular members	New Zealand	(New Zealand) Wayne Christie
Titular members	Australia	(Australia) Garry Connelly
Titular members	Denmark	(Denmark) Tom Kristensen
Titular members	Barbados	(Barbados) Andrew Mallalieu
Titular members	Kenya	(Kenya) Amina Mohamed
Titular members	Slovenia	(Slovenia) Rado Raspet
Titular members	Great Britain	(United Kingdom) David Richards
Titular members	United States	(United States) George Silbermann
Titular members	Czech Republic	(Czech Republic) Jan Stovicek
Titular members	Turkey	(Turkey) Serkan Yazici
Titular members	China	(China) Tao Zhang
Members by right	FIA Women in Motorsport Commission Chairperson	(Turkey) Burcu Çetinkaya
Members by right	Formula One Group Representative	(Italy) Stefano Domenicali
Members by right	FIA Manufacturers' Committee President or F1 Commission Delegate	(Austria) Oliver Schmerold or (France) Frédéric Vasseur
Members by right	FIA Drivers' Committee President	(Republic of Ireland) Ronan Morgan
Members by right	FIA International Karting Commission President	(India) Akbar Ebrahim

The most crucial roles and responsibilities of the World Motor Sport Council include:

- To ensure the enforcement of the FIA statutes and, to resolve sporting questions of the general assembly.
- To finalise and ultimately approve the international sporting calendar for FIA international motor series such as Formula One, World Endurance Championship and World Rally Championship.
- To approve proposed regulations for the FIA championships.
- To administrate the finances of FIA sports given the budget of the FIA.
