= 2017 Middle East Rally Championship =

The 2017 Middle East Rally Championship was an international rally championship sanctioned by the FIA. The championship was contested over five events held in five Middle East countries from February to September.

Qatar's Nasser Al-Attiyah won his thirteenth MERC championship and his seventh consecutively. Al-Attiyah won three rallies over the course of the season creating a gap unable to be approached. Kuwaiti driver Meshari Al-Thefiri led the points after three rallies but was unable to score any points subsequently. Lebanese veteran Roger Feghali's one-off appearance and victory at his home event was enough to finish the year third in the championship.

== Event calendar and results ==
The 2017 MERC was as follows:

Round	Rally name	Podium finishers				Statistics			
Round	Rally name	Rank	Driver	Car	Time	Stages	Length	Starters	Finishers
1	Qatar International Rally (3–4 February)	1	(Qatar) Rashid Al-Naimi	Subaru WRX Sti	1:56:28.3	12	205.16 km	10	5
1	Qatar International Rally (3–4 February)	2	(Qatar) Nasser Al-Kuwari	Mitsubishi Lancer Evolution IX	2:11:17.2	12	205.16 km	10	5
1	Qatar International Rally (3–4 February)	3	(Kuwait) Meshari Al-Thefiri	Mitsubishi Lancer Evolution X	2:22:17.0	12	205.16 km	10	5
2	Jordan Rally (4–6 May)	1	(Qatar) Nasser Al-Attiyah	Ford Fiesta R5	2:56:37.0	18	238.20 km	13	8
2	Jordan Rally (4–6 May)	2	(Jordan) Marouf Abu Samra	Mitsubishi Lancer Evolution IX	3:12:46.3	18	238.20 km	13	8
2	Jordan Rally (4–6 May)	3	(Kuwait) Meshari Al-Thefiri	Mitsubishi Lancer Evolution X	3:17:15.0	18	238.20 km	13	8
3	Cyprus Rally (16–18 June)	1	(Qatar) Nasser Al-Attiyah	Ford Fiesta R5	2:31:44.3	14	219.74 km	67	46
3	Cyprus Rally (16–18 June)	2	(Cyprus) Simos Galatariotis	Mitsubishi Lancer Evolution X	2:37:56.3	14	219.74 km	67	46
3	Cyprus Rally (16–18 June)	3	(Cyprus) Panikos Polykarpou	Mitsubishi Lancer Evolution IX	2:38:03.8	14	219.74 km	67	46
4	Rally of Lebanon (25–27 August)	1	(Lebanon) Roger Feghali	Škoda Fabia R5	2:01:33.5	11	206.30 km	31	22
4	Rally of Lebanon (25–27 August)	2	(Lebanon) Gilbert Bannout	Škoda Fabia R5	2:07:33.7	11	206.30 km	31	22
4	Rally of Lebanon (25–27 August)	3	(Lebanon) Rodolphe Asmar	Mitsubishi Lancer Evolution X	2:11:41.2	11	206.30 km	31	22
5	(Iran) Shiraz International Rally (13–15 September)	1	(Qatar) Nasser Al-Attiyah	Ford Fiesta R5	1:55:02.0	12	202.14 km	12	8
5	(Iran) Shiraz International Rally (13–15 September)	2	(Czech Republic) Vojtěch Štajf	Škoda Fabia R5	1:56:32.3	12	202.14 km	12	8
5	(Iran) Shiraz International Rally (13–15 September)	3	(Iran) Hormoz Kalhor	Kia Cerato	2:31:57.2	12	202.14 km	12	8

== Championship standings ==
The 2017 MERC for Drivers points was as follows:

Pos.	Driver	Vehicle	(Qatar) QAT	(Jordan) JOR	(Cyprus) CYP	(Lebanon) LBN	(Iran) SHI	Total
1	(Qatar) Nasser Al-Attiyah	Ford Fiesta R5	Ret	1	1	6	1	136
2	(Kuwait) Meshari Al-Thefiri	Mitsubishi Lancer Evolution X	2	3	5	13		71
3	(Lebanon) Roger Feghali	Škoda Fabia R5				1		39
4	(Qatar) Rashed Al Naimi	Subaru WRX Sti	1					37
5	(Czech Republic) Vojtěch Štajf	Škoda Fabia R5					2	31
6	(Cyprus) Simos Galatariotis	Mitsubishi Lancer Evolution X			2			30
7	(Lebanon) Gilbert Bannout	Škoda Fabia R5				2		28
8	(Cyprus) Savvas Savva	Mitsubishi Lancer Evolution IX			3			25
9	(Jordan) Ihab Al-Shorafa	Mitsubishi Lancer Evolution IX		4				24
10	(Lebanon) Rodolphe Asmar	Mitsubishi Lancer Evolution X				3		23
11	(Iran) Ali Mesgarha	Mitsubishi Lancer Evolution IX					3	20
11	(Jordan) Asem Aref	Renault Clio	Ret	5	8	Ret		20
13	(Cyprus) Costas Laos	Mitsubishi Lancer Evolution IX			4			17
13	(Lebanon) Patrick Njeim	Citroën DS3 R3T				4		17
15	(Lebanon) Nadim Halabi	Mitsubishi Lancer Evolution IX				5		14
16	(Lebanon) Eddy Abou-Karam	Hyundai i20 R5				7		12
17	(Cyprus) Mehmet Yucel	Ford Fiesta S2000			6			10
18	(Germany) Edith Weiss	Mitsubishi Lancer Evolution IX			7			7
19	(Qatar) Khalid Mohammad Al-Suwaidi	Škoda Fabia R5	Ret					6
20	(Lebanon) Nabil Abdelhak	Mitsubishi Lancer Evolution X				8		5
20	(Jordan) Khaled Juma	Mitsubishi Lancer Evolution X		Ret				5
20	(Czech Republic) Daniel Landa	Škoda Fabia R5					Ret	5
23	(Cyprus) Michalis Posedias	Mitsubishi Lancer Evolution X			Ret			4
24	(Saudi Arabia) Rakan Al-Rashed	Mitsubishi Lancer Evolution IX		Ret				3
24	(Cyprus) Demetris Papasavvas	Mitsubishi Lancer Evolution IX			Ret			3
26	(Lebanon) Elie Nehme	Renault Clio R3				9		2
26	(Kuwait) Essam Al-Nejadi	Mitsubishi Lancer Evolution IX		Ret				2
26	(Cyprus) Andreas Filippou	Subaru Impreza STi N15			Ret			2
26	(Lebanon) Joseph Hindy	Mitsubishi Lancer Evolution X				Ret		2
30	(Lebanon) Matthias Njeim	Peugeot 208 R2				10		1
30	(Kuwait) Salem Al-Thafferi	Mitsubishi Lancer Evolution X		Ret				1
30	(Lebanon) Nassib Nassar	Mitsubishi Lancer Evolution IX				Ret		1

Key
Colour	Result
Gold	Winner
Silver	2nd place
Bronze	3rd place
Green	Points finish
Blue	Non-points finish
Blue	Non-classified finish (NC)
Purple	Did not finish (Ret)
Black	Excluded (EX)
Black	Disqualified (DSQ)
White	Did not start (DNS)
White	Cancelled (C)
Blank	Withdrew entry from the event (WD)
