= World Rally Drivers Alliance =

Trade union of rally drivers

- Formation: 2025
- Chairman: (France) Julien Ingrassia
- Directors: (United Kingdom) Scott Martin

The World Rally Drivers Alliance (WoRDA) is the trade union of World Rally Championship drivers.

== History ==
Though talks of a rally drivers' union in emulation of the Grand Prix Drivers' Association had been around since the Group B era, particularly during the 1986 World Rally Championship when an accident involving Joaquim Santos's Ford RS200 during that year's Rally de Portugal killed four spectators, the union was not organized until 2025 by retired co-driver Julien Ingrassia and former Toyota teammate Scott Martin amidst calls by rally crews for an avenue to voice their concerns and complaints.

The WoRDA gained prominence that same year amidst a controversy surrounding Mohammed Ben Sulayem's change in the International Sporting Code which imposed harsh penalties against the use of profanities by drivers and co-drivers during events sanctioned by the Fédération Internationale de l'Automobile (FIA), in particular an incident after the conclusion of Rally Sweden where Adrien Fourmaux incurred a €10,000 fine for swearing during an interview, as well as the lack of transparency as to the use of fine revenue.

On April 21, 2025, the WoRDA and the FIA reached an agreement on the swearing ban by defining zones where crews are able to freely express their sentiments during FIA-sanctioned events.
