= Mini John Cooper Works WRC =

World Rally Championship car

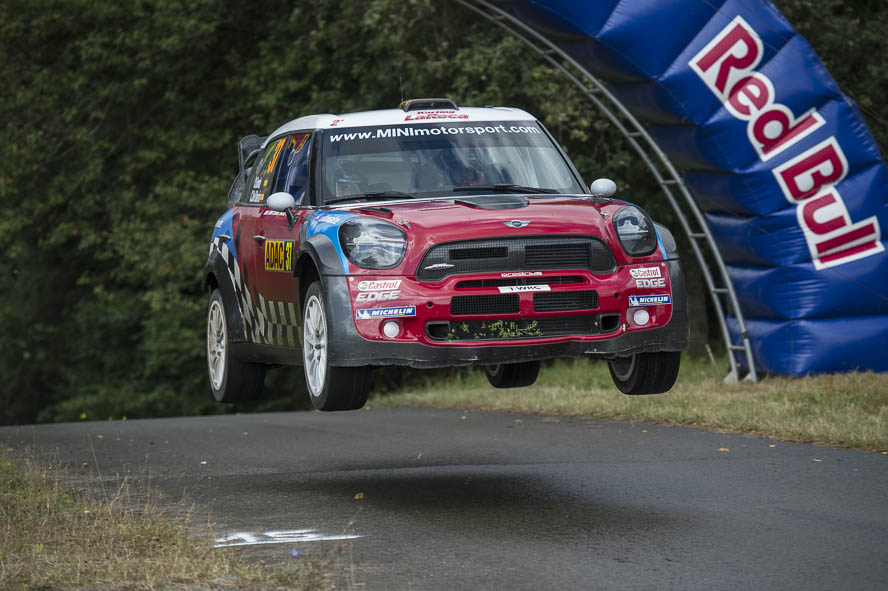
- Category: World Rally Car
- Constructor: Prodrive
- Designers: Paul Doe (chief designer, Prodrive); David Lapworth (technical director)

Technical specifications
- Suspension: MacPherson type
- Length: 4,110 mm (161.8 in)
- Width: 1,820 mm (71.7 in)
- Engine: 1.6 L BMW Motorsport I4 turbocharged
- Transmission: Xtrac 6-speed sequential manual transmission Front and rear mechanical auto-locking differentials
- Weight: 1,200 kg (2,645.5 lb)
- Tyres: Michelin

Competition history (WRC)
- Notable entrants: (United Kingdom) Mini WRC Team/Prodrive WRC Team; Brazil World Rally Team (Italy) Motorsport Italia; WRC Team Mini Portugal (Poland) Lotos Team WRC (Ukraine) Ascania Racing
- Notable drivers: (Ukraine) Valeriy Gorban (Estonia) Mait Maarend (Spain) Dani Sordo (United Kingdom) Kris Meeke (Brazil) Daniel Oliveira (Portugal) Armindo Araújo (Australia) Chris Atkinson (Brazil) Paulo Nobre (France) Pierre Campana (Sweden) Patrik Sandell (Finland) Jarkko Nikara (Poland) Michał Kościuszko
- Debut: 2011 Rally Italia Sardegna

The Mini John Cooper Works WRC is a World Rally Car debuted by the Mini WRC Team during the 2011 World Rally Championship season. It is the first rally car to bear the Mini label in top-level rallying since the 1960s. The car was entered in a limited campaign for 2011, with a view to a complete championship from 2012 and was run by Prodrive, who previously had success with the Subaru Impreza WRC.

The WRC is based on the Mini Countryman and features a direct-injection 1.6 L turbocharged inline four-cylinder engine. The WRC's engine was developed by BMW Motorsport for use in a variety of motorsport series, including the FIA World Touring Car Championship.

== Accolades ==
=== Wins ===
- 2011 Rallye Mont-Blanc (Pierre Campana)
- 2012 Tour de Corse (Dani Sordo and Carlos del Barrio) (with S2000 1.6T)
- 2012 Qatar International Rally (Abdulaziz Al-Kuwari and Killian Duffy) (with S2000 1.6T)
- 2012 Lurgan Park Rally (Kris Meeke and Gerry McVeigh)
- 2013 Spanish Rally Championship (Luis Monzon and José Déniz)
- 2013, 2014 Czech Rally Championship (Václav Pech and Petr Uhel) (with S2000 1.6T)
- 2014 Barum Czech Rally Zlín (Václav Pech and Petr Uhel) (with S2000 1.6T)

=== Runners-up ===
- 2011 Rallye de France (Dani Sordo and Carlos del Barrio)
- 2012 Monte Carlo Rally (Dani Sordo and Carlos del Barrio)
- 2012 Rally of Lebanon (Abdo Feghali and Marc Haddad) (with S2000 1.6T)
- 2013 Barum Czech Rally Zlín (Václav Pech and Petr Uhel) (with S2000 1.6T)
- 2014 Internationale Jänner Rallye (Václav Pech and Petr Uhel) (with S2000 1.6T)
- 2015 Barum Czech Rally Zlín (Václav Pech and Petr Uhel) (with S2000 1.6T)

== Gallery ==
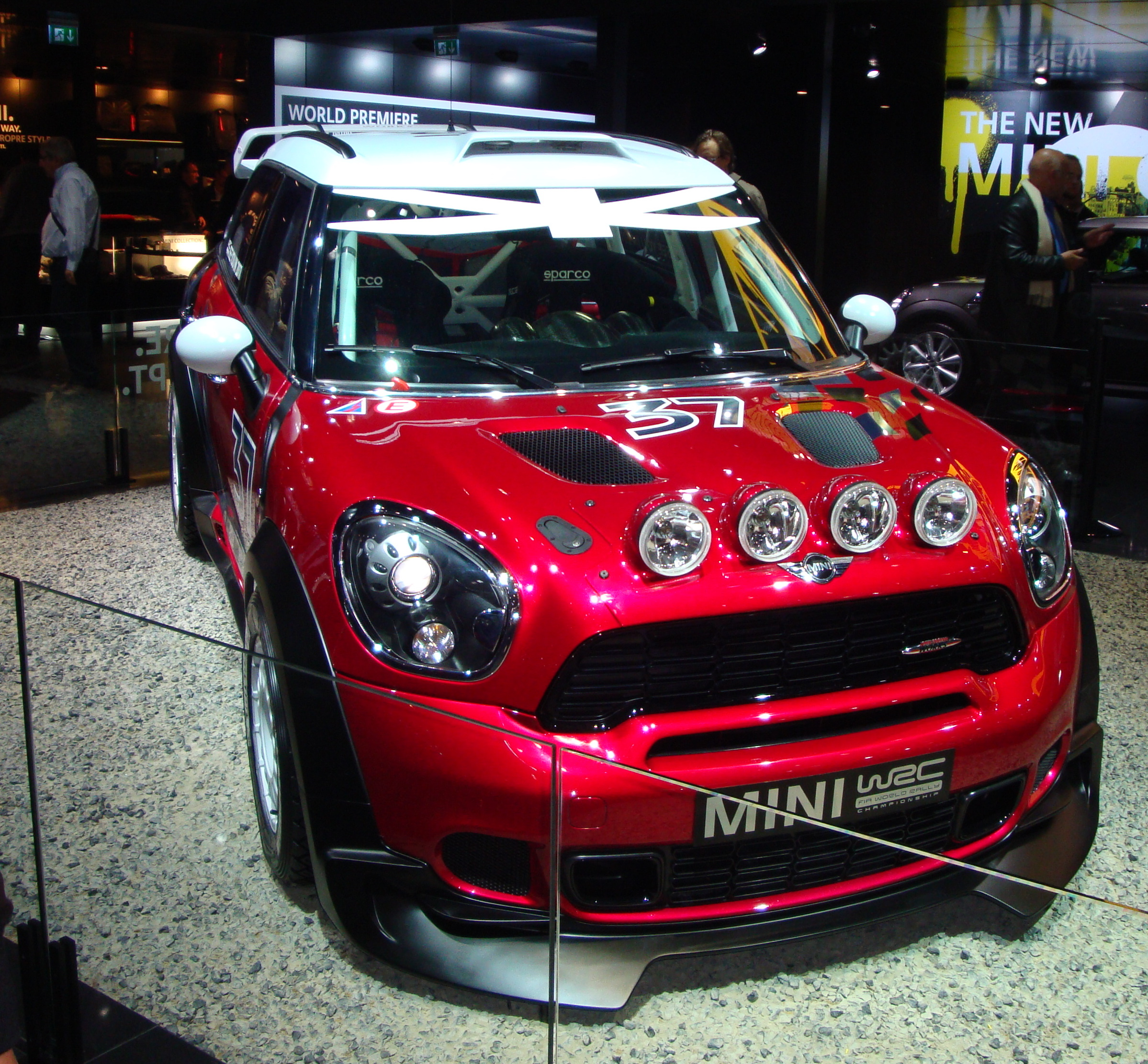
John Cooper Works WRC shown in Paris in 2010

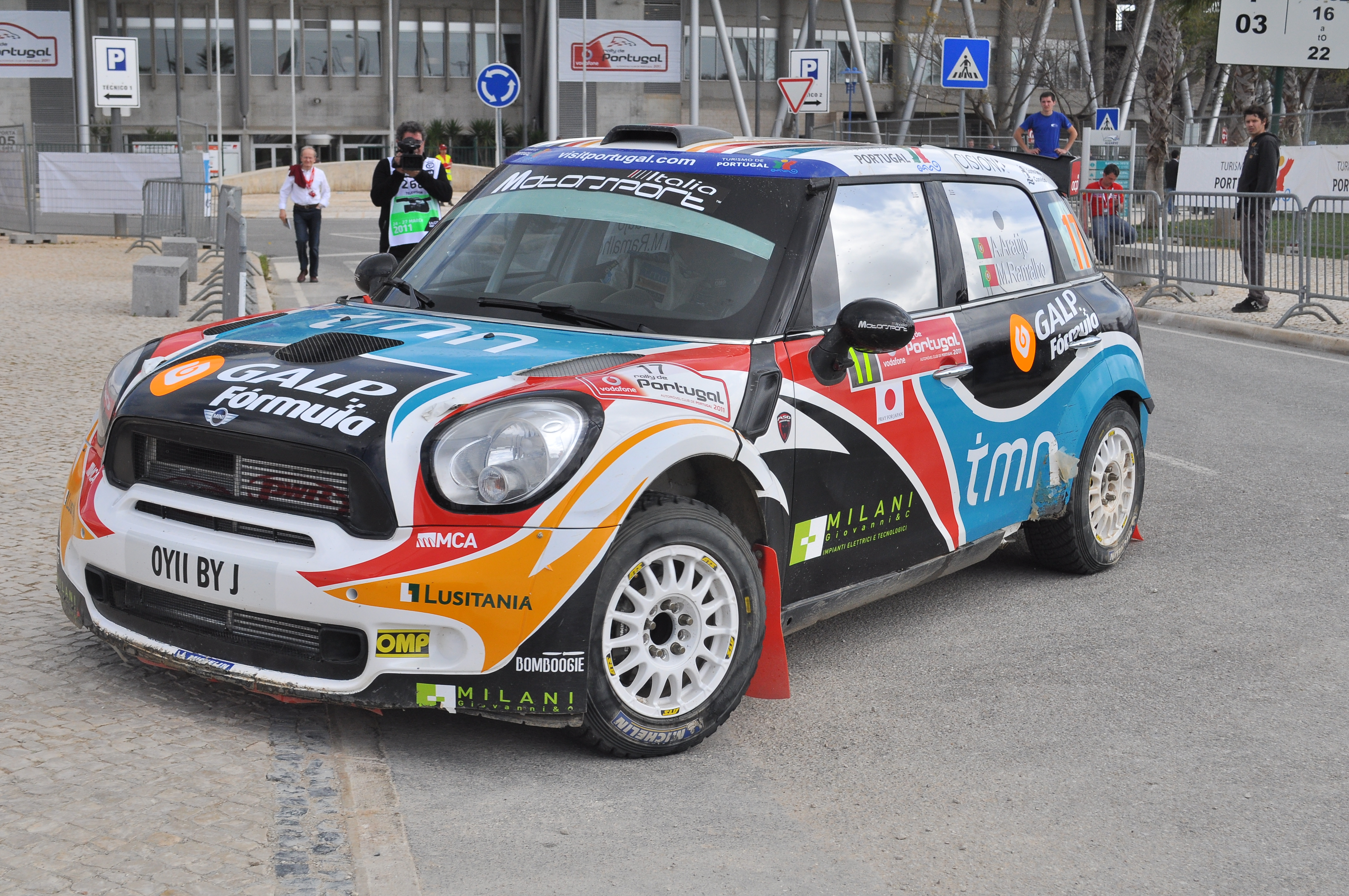
Armindo Araújo's Super 2000 model at the 2011 Rally de Portugal

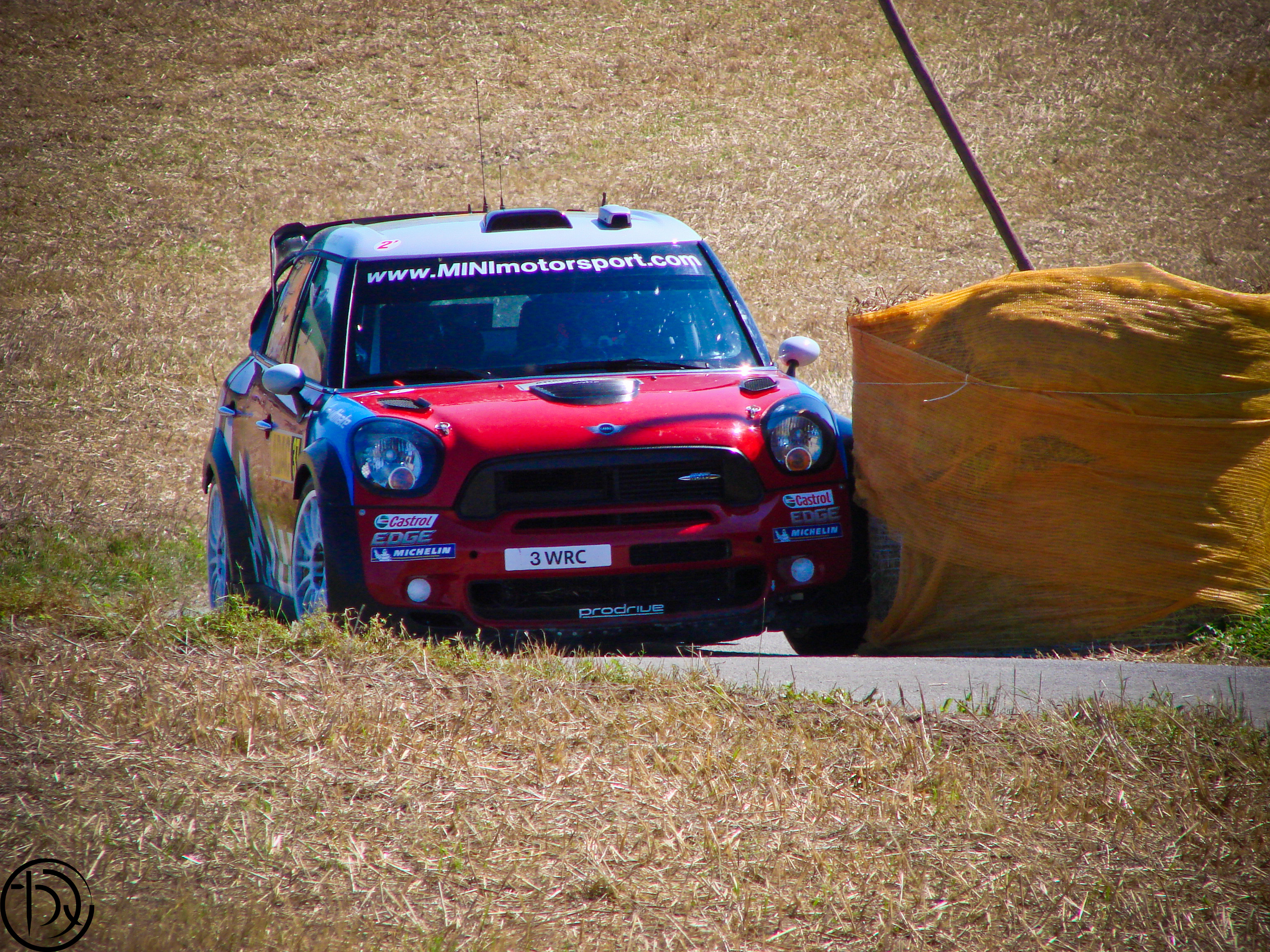
Dani Sordo heading to third place in the 2011 Rallye Deutschland

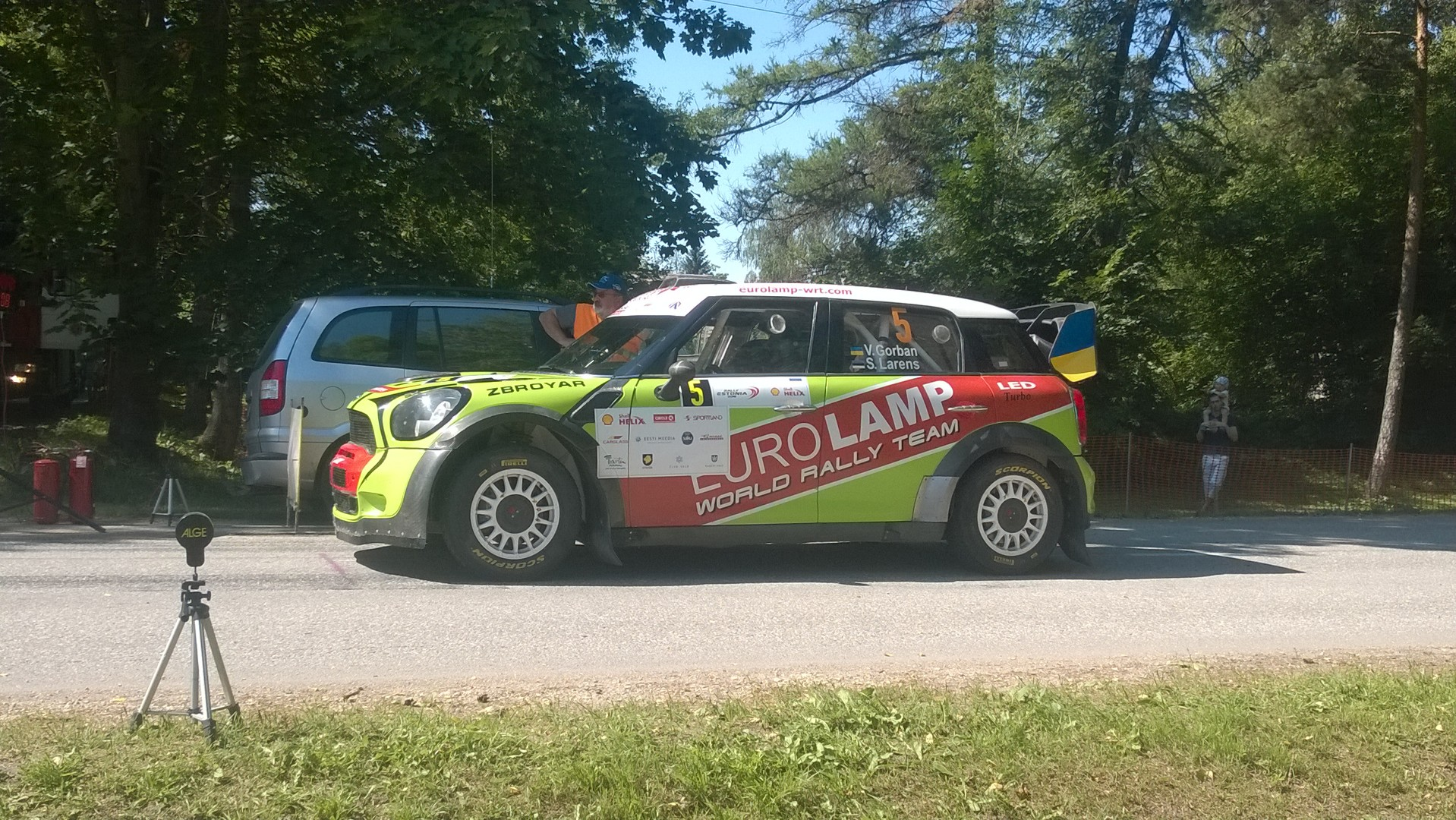
Valeriy Gorban at the 2018 Rally Estonia

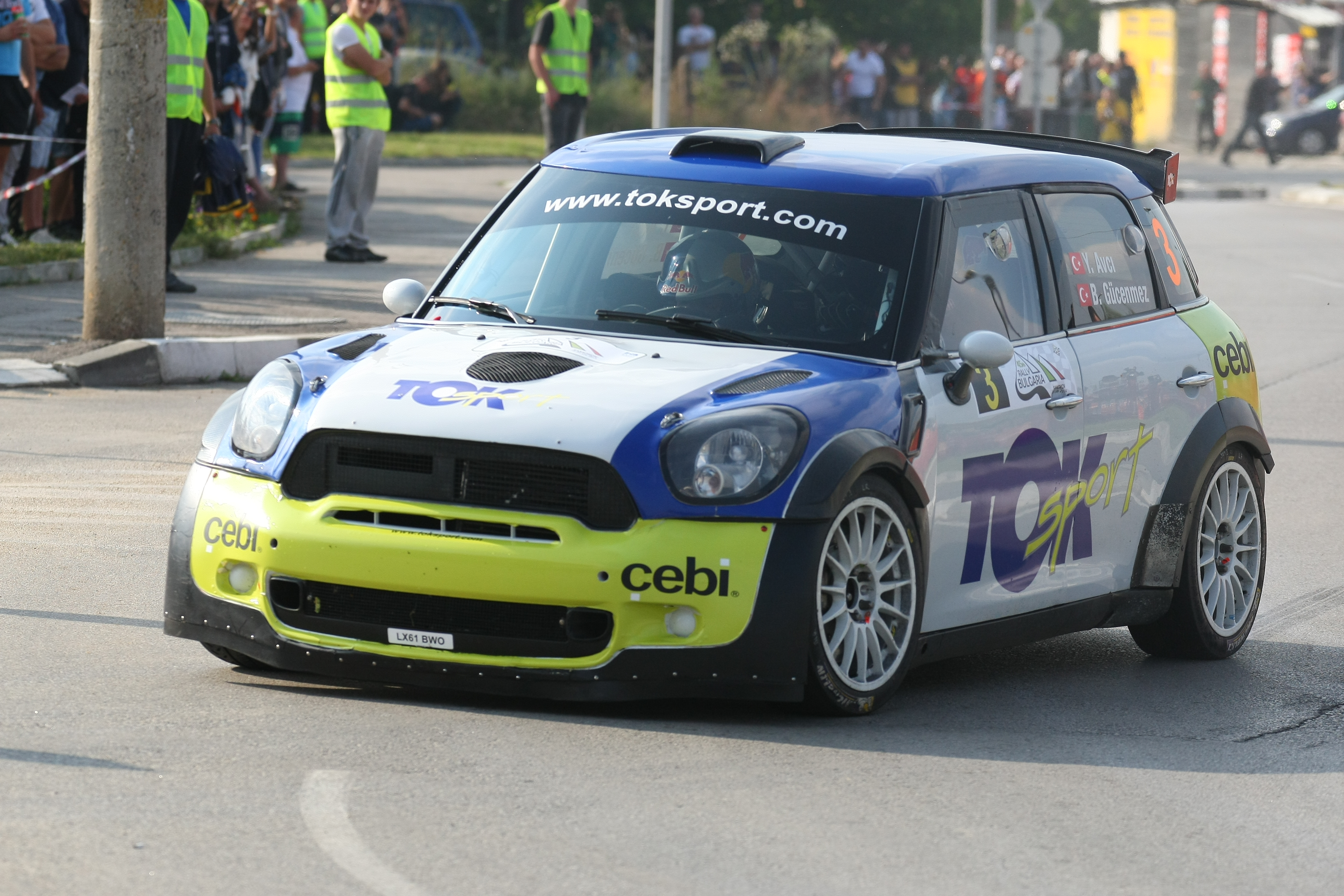
Yağız Avcı with Super 2000 in Rally Bulgaria 2014

== See also ==
- X-raid
- Mini All4 Racing
- Andros Trophy, a non-WRC event won by a vehicle based on the Mini Countryman
- 2013 Pikes Peak International Hillclimb, a non-WRC event entered by a 900 bhp vehicle based on the Mini Countryman.
- 2013 Global RallyCross Championship, having events won by a Mini Countryman JCW

Awards
Preceded by Citroën C4 WRC	Autosport Awards; Rally Car of the Year; 2011	Succeeded by Citroën DS3 WRC
