= Toyota Celica Twin-Cam Turbo =

Rally competition car

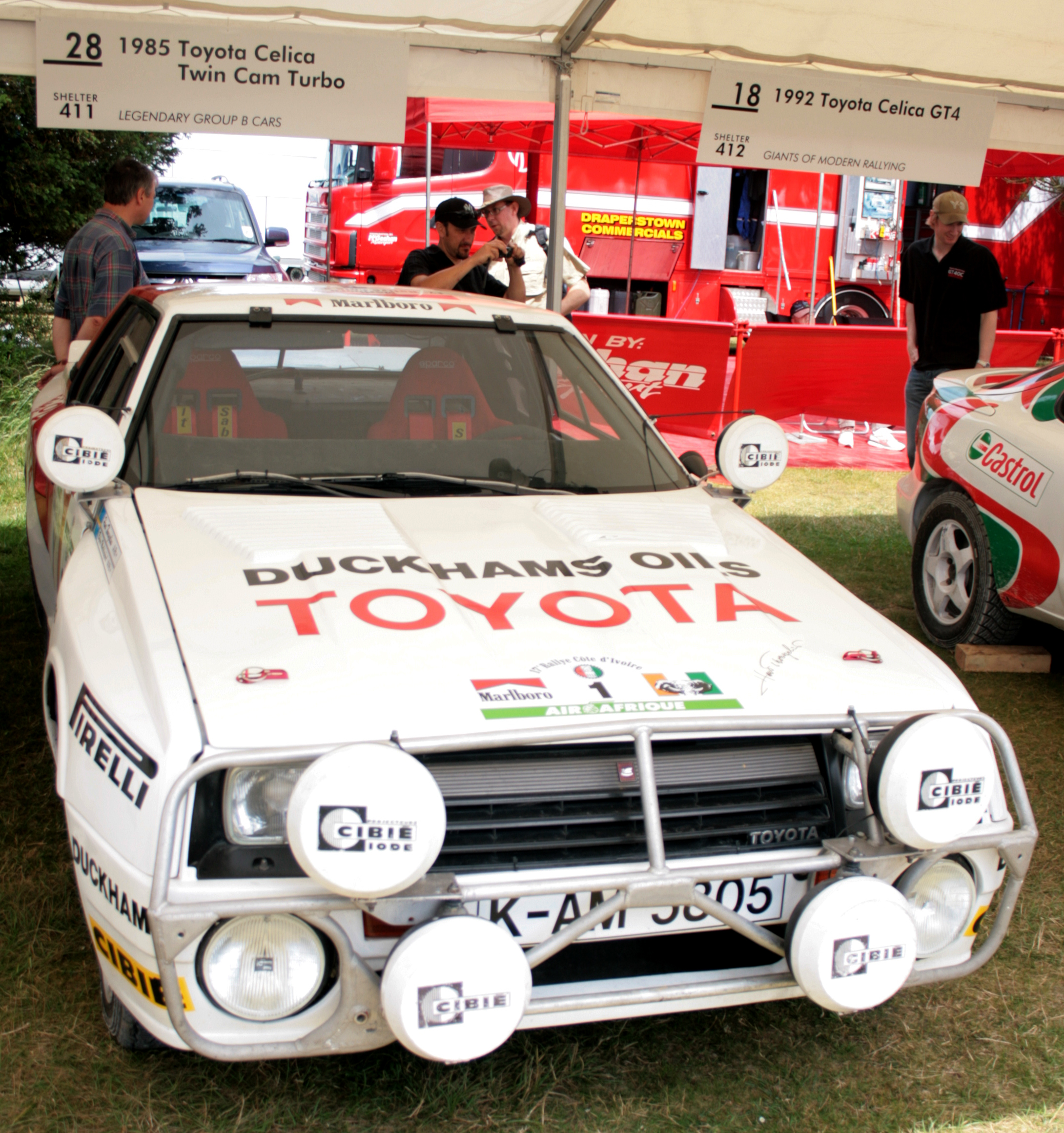
1985 Toyota Celica Twin Cam Turbo (TA64) Group B rally car

The Toyota Celica Twin-Cam Turbo is a racing car produced to compete in rally racing in Group B, presented by Toyota in 1983 and used until the abolition of Group B at the end of 1986.

The Celica Twin-Cam Turbo proved to be one of the best-used cars in African rallies, winning both the Safari Rally and the Ivory Coast Rally on three occasions, earning the nickname King of Africa.

== Features ==
The main rules for racing in Group B were to produce at least 200 road cars and Toyota based the Twin-Cam Turbo on the top of the line GT-T model Celica.

Although all wheel drive cars like the Audi Quattro were dominating the sport, the Celica, in a similar vein to the Lancia 037 Rally, had rear-wheel drive.

The car debuted in the 1983 World Rally Championship at the 1000 Lakes Rally with driver Juha Kankkunen finishing sixth overall. It was not competitive in many events due to the lack of AWD but its solid reliability and top end speed saw it achieve victories in more endurance focussed events such as the Ivory Coast Rally.

In 1984, the Swedish driver Waldegård finished first overall at the Safari Rally, giving the first of three consecutive victories to the Toyota team.

With the end of Group B, the Twin Cam Turbo engine became the engine (TA64) of the future Toyota Celica GT-Four, proving perfect for all-wheel drive used since 1987.

== Results ==
=== Wins in the WRC ===
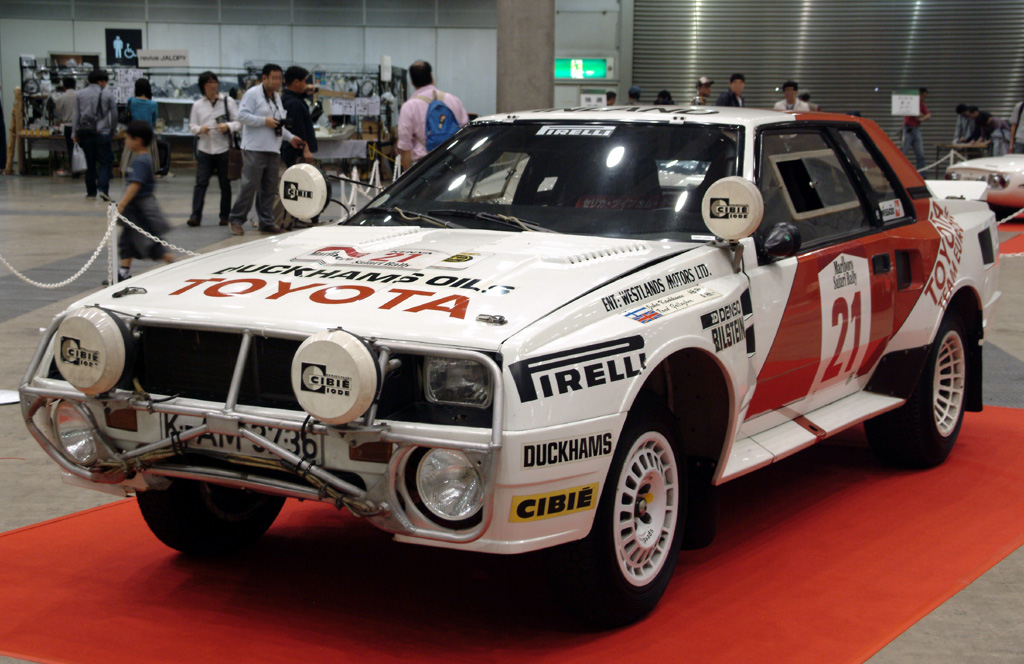
Toyota Celica Twincam Turbo (TA64) Group B rally car

- 1983 15ème Rallye Marlboro Côte d'Ivoire (Björn Waldegård/Hans Thorszelius)
- 1984 32nd Marlboro Safari Rally (Björn Waldegård/Hans Thorszelius)
- 1985 33nd Marlboro Safari Rally and 17ème Rallye Marlboro Côte d'Ivoire (both Juha Kankkunen/Fred Gallagher)
- 1986 34nd Marlboro Safari Rally and 18ème Rallye Marlboro Côte d'Ivoire (both Björn Waldegård/Fred Gallagher)
