= Nicolas Amiouni =

Lebanese Rally driver (born 1989)

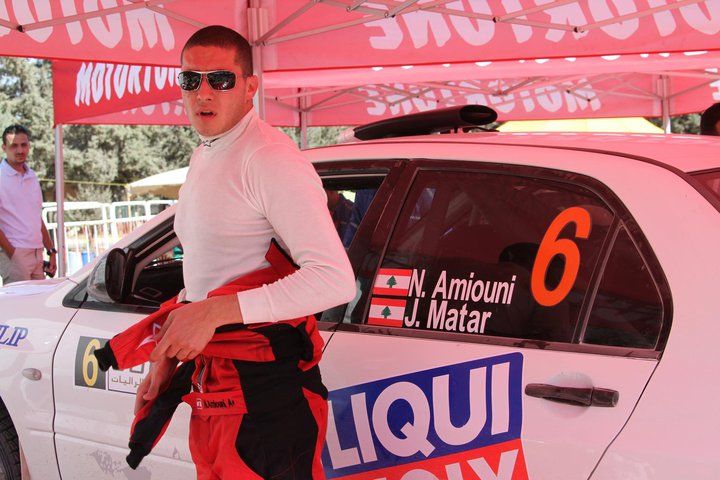
- Nicolas Amiouni in Jordan, during the 2010 season

Personal information
- Nationality: (Lebanon) Lebanese
- Born: 16 March 1989 (age 37); Achrafieh, Lebanon

World Rally Championship record
- Years active: 2011–2015
- Rallies: 9
- Rally wins: 0
- Podiums: 0
- Stage wins: 0
- Total points: 0
- First rally: 2011 Jordan Rally
- Last rally: 2015 Rally Finland

Nicolas Amiouni (born on March 16, 1989, Beirut) is a Lebanese Rally driver. He started his professional racing career in 2004, competing in the Lebanese go-kart championship and made his move to Rallying in 2010 as a member of Motortune Racing, participating in seven Middle East Rally Championship rallies. Amiouni managed to clinch several notable positions during his rookie year.

In 2011, Amiouni continued his rallying career participating in numerous local and regional events claiming several wins and noteworthy finishes. His season was highlighted by finishing third in the Lebanese Rally Championship, and winning the Group N in the Jordan WRC.

In 2012, Amiouni participated in the Lebanese Rally Championship and the National Jordanian Rallies claiming his first overall win in the first rally of the season.

In 2013, Amiouni focused his efforts on the Lebanese Motorsports specifically Rallying and Hill climbs. Amiouni won the Group N Lebanese Hill Climb Championship and claimed the second position in the Lebanese Rally Championship.

In 2014, Amiouni expanded his program participating in the WRC's Drive Dmack competing in six rounds of the world rally championship: Portugal, Poland, Finland, Germany and Spain. Locally Amiouni managed to win the Rally of Lebanon and won the Group N Lebanese Rally Championship.

In 2015, Amiouni participated in three WRC rounds of the Drive Dmack (Portugal, Poland and Finland); in addition he managed to finish second in the Rally of Lebanon while winning his category Gr.RC2/N4.

In 2016, Amiouni did not manage to get proper sponsorship in order to participate in any local or international events, but his love for competition made him return to the driver seat in 2017 and win his class again RC2/N4 and finish second in the Spring Rally (first round of the Lebanese Rally Championship).

In 2018, Amiouni decided to tackle the Lebanese Rally Championship once again and managed to win (RC2/N4) the first round (Spring Rally) while finishing fourth overall. Amiouni had some mechanical issues that forced to retire from the Gr.N leadership in Jezzine Rally (2nd round LRC). Due to lack of sponsorship, Amiouni had to suspend his LRC campaign for 2018 until further notice.

== Career results ==
=== WRC results ===
Year	Entrant	Car	1	2	3	4	5	6	7	8	9	10	11	12	13	WDC	Pts
2011	Nicolas Amiouni	Mitsubishi Lancer Evo IX	SWE	MEX	POR	JOR; 15	ITA	ARG	GRE	FIN	GER	AUS	FRA	ESP	GBR	NC	0
2014	Nicolas Amiouni	Ford Fiesta R2	MON	SWE	MEX	POR; Ret	ARG	ITA	POL; 39	FIN; Ret	GER; 41	AUS	FRA	ESP; 39	GBR	NC	0
2015	Nicolas Amiouni	Ford Fiesta R2	MON	SWE	MEX	ARG	POR; 59	ITA	POL; 47	FIN; Ret	GER	AUS	FRA	ESP	GBR	NC	0

=== Drive DMACK Cup results ===
Year	Entrant	Car	1	2	3	4	5	Pos.	Points
2014	Nicolas Amiouni	Ford Fiesta R2	POR; Ret	POL; 6	FIN; Ret	GER; 6	ESP; 8	9th	20
2015	Nicolas Amiouni	Ford Fiesta R2T	POR; 9	POL; 7	FIN; Ret	GER	ESP	11th	0
