= Rally of Lebanon =

Middle East Rally: Only tarmac event, ATCL-organized since 1968

Rally of Lebanon (known originally as the Rally Montagne) is the only tarmac rally of the Middle East Rally Championship, organised by the ATCL (Automobile et Touring Club du Liban). The rally was first held in 1968.

== Past winners ==
Year	Rank	Driver	Co-Driver	Car
2022	1	(Qatar) Nasser Al-Attiyah	(France) Mathieu Baumel	VW Polo GTI R5
2022	2	(Lebanon) Bassel Abou Hamdan	(Lebanon) Firas Elias	Skoda Fabia R5
2022	3	(Lebanon) Tamer Ghandour	(Lebanon) Salim Jleilaty	Skoda Fabia R5
2021	1	(Lebanon) Roger Feghali	(Lebanon) Joseph Matar	Skoda Fabia R5 Evo
2021	2	(Qatar) Nasser Al-Attiyah	(France) Mathieu Baumel	VW Polo GTI R5
2021	3	(Lebanon) Alex Feghali	(Lebanon) Georges Deaibes	Mitsubishi Lancer Evo X
2019	1	(Qatar) Nasser Al-Attiyah	(France) Mathieu Baumel	VW Polo GTI R5
2019	2	(Lebanon) Rodrigue Rahi	(Lebanon) Georges Nader	Mitsubishi Lancer Evo IX
2019	3	(Lebanon) Patrick Njeim	(Lebanon) Thierry Rouhana	Mitsubishi Lancer Evo IX
2018	1	(Lebanon) Roger Feghali	(Lebanon) Joseph Matar	Skoda Fabia R5
2018	2	(Qatar) Nasser Al-Attiyah	(France) Mathieu Baumel	Ford Fiesta R5
2018	3	(Lebanon) Rodolphe Asmar	(Lebanon) Ziad Chehab	Skoda Fabia R5
2017	1	(Lebanon) Roger Feghali	(Lebanon) Joseph Matar	Skoda Fabia R5
2017	2	(Lebanon) Gilbert Bannout	(France) Maxime Vilmot	Skoda Fabia R5
2017	3	(Lebanon) Rodolphe Asmar	(Lebanon) Ziad Chehab	Mitsubishi Lancer Evo X
2016	1	(Lebanon) Tamer Ghandour	(Lebanon) Salim Jleilaty	Mitsubishi Lancer Evo X R4
2016	2	(Lebanon) Abdo Feghali	(Lebanon) Marc Haddad	Skoda Fabia R5
2016	3	(Lebanon) Eddy Abou Karam	(Lebanon) Joseph Kmeid	Mitsubishi Lancer Evo X
2015	1	(Lebanon) Roger Feghali	(Lebanon) Joseph Matar	Ford Fiesta R5
2015	2	(Lebanon) Nicolas Amiouni	(Lebanon) Elie Moussallem	Mitsubishi Lancer Evo X
2015	3	(Lebanon) Tamer Ghandour	(Lebanon) Salim Jleilaty	Mitsubishi Lancer Evo X
2014	1	(Lebanon) Nicolas Amiouni	(Lebanon) Chadi Beiruti	Mitsubishi Lancer Evo X
2014	2	(Lebanon) Rodrigue Rahi	(Lebanon) Nabil Abdallah	Mitsubishi Lancer Evo IX
2014	3	(Qatar) Abdulaziz Al-Kuwari	(United Kingdom) Kilian Duffy	Ford Fiesta RRC
2013	1	(Lebanon) Roger Feghali	(Lebanon) Joseph Matar	Ford Fiesta RRC
2013	2	(Qatar) Nasser Al-Attiyah	(Italy) Giovanni Bernacchini	Ford Fiesta RRC
2013	3	(Lebanon) Abdo Feghali	(Lebanon) Marc Haddad	Mini Cooper S2000 1.6T
2012	1	(Lebanon) Roger Feghali	(Lebanon) Joseph Matar	Ford Fiesta RRC
2012	2	(Lebanon) Abdo Feghali	(Lebanon) Marc Haddad	Mini Cooper S2000 1.6T
2012	3	(Qatar) Abdulaziz Al-Kuwari	(United Kingdom) Kilian Duffy	Mini Cooper S2000 1.6T
2011	1	(Lebanon) Roger Feghali	(Lebanon) Joseph Matar	Mitsubishi Lancer Evo X
2011	2	(Qatar) Nasser Al-Attiyah	(Italy) Giovanni Bernacchini	Ford Fiesta S2000
2011	3	(Lebanon) Abdo Feghali	(Lebanon) Marc Haddad	Mitsubishi Lancer Evo IX
2010	1	(Lebanon) Roger Feghali	(Lebanon) Nabil Njeim	Škoda Fabia S2000
2010	2	(United Arab Emirates) Khalid Al Qassimi	(United Kingdom) Michael Orr	Ford Fiesta S2000
2010	3	(Lebanon) Ziad Feghali	(Lebanon) Jihad El Hachem	Mitsubishi Lancer Evo VII
2009	1	(Lebanon) Roger Feghali	(Lebanon) Nabil Njeim	Mitsubishi Lancer Evo IX
2009	2	(Lebanon) Gilbert Bannout	(Lebanon) Joseph Kmeid	Mitsubishi Lancer Evo VII
2009	3	(Saudi Arabia) Yazeed Al Rajhi	(France) Mathieu Baumel	Peugeot 207 S2000
2008	1	(Lebanon) Roger Feghali	(Italy) Giovanni Bernacchini	Subaru Impreza WRX N14
2008	2	(Lebanon) Nicholai Georgiou	(Lebanon) Joseph Matar	Mitsubishi Lancer Evo IX
2008	3	(Lebanon) Gilbert Bannout	(Lebanon) Joseph Kmeid	Mitsubishi Lancer Evo VIII
2007	1	(Lebanon) Roger Feghali	(Lebanon) Nabil Njeim	Mitsubishi Lancer Evo IX
2007	2	(Qatar) Nasser Al-Attiyah	(United Kingdom) Chris Patterson	Subaru Impreza WRX
2007	3	(United Arab Emirates) Khalid Al Qassimi	(United Kingdom) Michael Orr	Subaru Impreza WRX
2006	1	(Lebanon) Roger Feghali	(Lebanon) Nabil Njeim	Mitsubishi Lancer Evo IX
2006	2	(Lebanon) Abdo Feghali	(Lebanon) Joseph Matar	Subaru Impreza WRX
2006	3	(Qatar) Nasser Al-Attiyah	(United Kingdom) Chris Patterson	Subaru Impreza WRX
2004	1	(Lebanon) Roger Feghali	(Lebanon) Nabil Njeim	Mitsubishi Lancer Evo VIII
2004	2	(Lebanon) Abdo Feghali	(Lebanon) Marc Haddad	Mitsubishi Lancer Evo VII
2004	3	(Lebanon) Jean-Pierre Nasrallah	(Lebanon) Joseph Matar	Mitsubishi Lancer Evo VIII
2003	1	(Lebanon) Roger Feghali	(Lebanon) Ziad Chehab	Subaru Impreza WRC
2003	2	(Lebanon) Abdo Feghali	(Lebanon) Joseph Matar	Toyota Corolla WRC
2003	3	(Lebanon) Rodrigue Rahi	(Lebanon) Patrick Ziade	Lancia Delta HF Integrale
2002	1	(Lebanon) Jean-Pierre Nasrallah	(Lebanon) Youssef Bassil	Subaru Impreza WRC
2002	2	(United Arab Emirates) Mohammed Ben Sulayem	(United Kingdom) John Spiller	Subaru Impreza WRC
2002	3	(Lebanon) Abdo Feghali	(Lebanon) Joseph Matar	Mitsubishi Lancer Evo VI
2001	1	(Italy) Pierro Liatti	(Italy) Carlo Cassina	Subaru Impreza WRC
2001	2	(Lebanon) Jean-Pierre Nasrallah	(Lebanon) Youssef Bassil	Subaru Impreza WRC
2001	3	(Saudi Arabia) Abdullah Bakhashab	(United Kingdom) Bobby Willis	Toyota Corolla WRC
2000	1	(Lebanon) Roger Feghali	(Lebanon) Ziad Chehab	Lancia Delta HF Integrale
2000	2	(Lebanon) Abdo Feghali	(Lebanon) Marc Haddad	Mitsubishi Lancer Evo V
2000	3	(Lebanon) Philippe Kazan	(Lebanon) Ghassan Bejjani	Renault Clio Williams
1999	1	(United Arab Emirates) Mohammed Ben Sulayem	(Republic of Ireland) Ronan Morgan	Ford Focus RS WRC
1999	2	(Lebanon) Roger Feghali	(Lebanon) Ziad Chehab	Volkswagen Golf III Kit Car
1999	3	(France) Yves Loubet	(France) Bruno Brissart	Lancia Delta HF Integrale
1998	1	(United Arab Emirates) Mohammed Ben Sulayem	(Republic of Ireland) Ronan Morgan	Ford Escort WRC
1998	2	(Norway) Petter Solberg	(Norway) Cato Menkerud	Toyota Celica GT4
1998	3	(Lebanon) Jean-Pierre Nasrallah	(Lebanon) Joseph Matar	Renault Megane Maxi Kit Car
1997	1	(Lebanon) Jean-Pierre Nasrallah	(Lebanon) Joseph Matar	Lancia Delta HF Integrale
1997	2	(Saudi Arabia) Abdullah Bakhashab	(United Kingdom) Bobby Willis	Toyota Celica
1997	3	(Lebanon) Zee Ohg	(Lebanon) Raffy Etyemezian	Lancia Delta HF Integrale
1996	1	(Saudi Arabia) Abdullah Bakhashab	(United Kingdom) Bobby Willis	Toyota Celica GT4
1996	2	(Lebanon) Zee Ohg	(Lebanon) Raffy Etyemezian	Subaru Impreza
1996	3	(United Arab Emirates) Mohammed Ben Sulayem	(Republic of Ireland) Ronan Morgan	Ford Escort RS Cosworth
1995	1	(Lebanon) Jean-Pierre Nasrallah	(Lebanon) Pierre Asmar	Lancia Delta HF Integrale
1995	2	(Lebanon) Nabil Karam	(Lebanon) Chief	Subaru Impreza
1995	3	(Lebanon) Zee Ohg	(Lebanon) Raffy Etyemezian	Subaru Impreza
1994	1	(Italy) Alex Fiorio	(Italy) Vittorio Brambilla	Lancia Delta HF Integrale
1994	2	(Lebanon) Johnny Moacadieh	(Lebanon) Joseph Matar	Lancia Delta HF Integrale
1994	3	(United Arab Emirates) Mohammed Ben Sulayem	(Republic of Ireland) Ronan Morgan	Ford Escort RS Cosworth
1993	1	(France) Alain Oreille	(France) Jean-Marc Andrie	Renault Clio Williams
1993	2	(France) Jean Ragnotti	(France) Gilles Timonier	Renault Clio Williams
1993	3	(Lebanon) Sleiman Slim	(Lebanon) Youssef Ghannam	Nissan Pulsar GTI-R
1992	1	(Lebanon) Bagheera	(Lebanon) Naji Stephan	Ford Sierra RS Cosworth
1992	2	(Saudi Arabia) Mamdouh Khayat	(United Kingdom) David Nicholson	Lancia Delta HF Integrale
1992	3	(Monaco) Tchine	(France) Etienne Massillon	Ford Sierra RS Cosworth
1991	1	(United Arab Emirates) Mohammed Ben Sulayem	(Republic of Ireland) Ronan Morgan	Toyota Celica GT4
1991	2	(Saudi Arabia) Mamdouh Khayat	(United Kingdom) David Nicholson	Ford Sierra RS Cosworth
1991	3	(Lebanon) Bagheera	(Lebanon) Naji Stephan	Ford Sierra RS Cosworth
1988	1	(Lebanon) Samir Ghanem	(Lebanon) Joseph Goubril	Nissan 240RS
1988	2	(Qatar) Saïd El Hajiri	(Qatar) Moubarak El Hajiri	Ford Sierra RS Cosworth
1988	3	(Lebanon) Jihad Tawil	(Lebanon) Mario Chélala	Nissan 240RS
1987	1	(United Arab Emirates) Mohammed Ben Sulayem	(United Kingdom) John Spiller	Opel Manta 400
1987	2	(Lebanon) Michel Saleh	(United Arab Emirates) Hassan Ben Shahdoor	Opel Manta 400
1987	3	(Lebanon) Samir Ghanem	(Lebanon) Joseph Goubril	Nissan 240RS
1986	1	(Lebanon) Nabil Karam	(Lebanon) Joe Saghbini	Porsche 911
1986	2	(Lebanon) Michel Saleh	(United Arab Emirates) Hassan Ben Shahdoor	Opel Manta 400
1986	3	(Lebanon) Tony Georgiou	(Cyprus) Chris Panayidès	Nissan 240RS
1985	1	(Lebanon) Naji Hneine	(Lebanon) Georges Assaf	Renault 5 Turbo
1985	2	(Lebanon) Nabil Karam	(Lebanon) Joe Hayek	Porsche 911
1985	3	(Lebanon) Patrick Mallat	(Lebanon) Pierre Rihan	BMW 320
1984	1	(Lebanon) Michel Araman	(Lebanon) Samir Habet	Renault 5 Turbo
1984	2	(Lebanon) Naji Hneine	(Lebanon) Georges Assaf	Renault 5 Turbo
1984	3	(Lebanon) Sarkis Babahekian	(Lebanon) Vatché Melkonian	Audi 80
1981	1	(Lebanon) Sahag Kasardjian	(Lebanon) Tony Karam	BMW 2002
1981	2	(Lebanon) Samir Homsi	(Lebanon) Garbis Tachdjian	Porsche 911
1981	3	(Lebanon) Jean-Noêl Pichon	(Lebanon) Joe Ayache	VW Scirocco
1980	1	(Lebanon) Albert Bassoul	(Lebanon) Gerard Saunal	Renault 17 Gordini
1980	2	(Lebanon) Georges Tabet	(Lebanon) Garbis Tachdjian	Fiat Ritmo
1980	3	(Lebanon) Selim Abou Nader	(Lebanon) Georges Assaf	BMW 2002
1979	1	(Lebanon) Georges Doumit	(Lebanon) Samir Chikhani	Audi 80 GT
1979	2	(Lebanon) Joe Hindi	(Lebanon) Raja Sarkis	Audi 100
1979	3	(Lebanon) Fady Bustros	(Lebanon) Nabil Hakim	Triumph
1974	1	(Lebanon) Tony Georgiou	(Lebanon) Jean-Loup Edde	Renault 16
1974	2	(Lebanon) Issa Sawabini	(Lebanon) Adel Tutunji	Porsche
1974	3	(Lebanon) Hanna Safatly	(Lebanon) Charles Baaklini	Audi 80 GT
1973	1	(Lebanon) Georges Matta	(Lebanon) Georges Moughanni	VW 1303 S
1973	2	(Lebanon) Pierre Baz	(Lebanon) Sami Touma	VW 1303 S
1973	3	(Lebanon) Georges Saad	(Lebanon) Georges Boustani	Toyota
1970	1	(Lebanon) Gerard Asfar	(Lebanon) Amin Hamoud	Renault 17 Gordini
1970	2	(Lebanon) Eddy Doumit	(Lebanon) Georges Tabet	Fiat 141 ST
1970	3	(Lebanon) Joe Arida	(Lebanon) Pierre Hneine	Renault 16
1968	1	(Lebanon) Jean Bassili	(Lebanon) Antoine Slim	Renault 10
1968	2	(Lebanon) Saeed Khoury	(Lebanon) Jihad Saad	BMW
1968	3	(Lebanon) Samir Homsi	(Lebanon) Gérard Asfar	Vauxhall

== Driver multiple wins ==
Pos	Driver	wins
1	(Lebanon) Roger Feghali	16
2	(United Arab Emirates) Mohammed Ben Sulayem	4
3	(Lebanon) Jean-Pierre Nasrallah	3
4	(Qatar) Nasser Al-Attiyah	2

== Make multiple wins ==
Pos	Make	wins
1	Renault	7
-	Mitsubishi	7
3	Ford	6
4	Lancia	4
-	Subaru	4
-	Skoda	4
7	VW	3
8	Toyota	2
