= Saeed Al-Hajri (rally driver) =

Qatari rally driver (born 1950)

Personal information
- Nationality: (Qatar) Qatari
- Born: 14 April 1950 (age 76); Doha, Qatar

World Rally Championship record
- Years active: 1984–1986, 1989
- Co-driver: (United Kingdom) John Spiller (United Kingdom) Steve Bond
- Teams: Porsche, Ford
- Rallies: 6
- Championships: 0
- Rally wins: 0
- Podiums: 0
- Stage wins: 0
- Total points: 21
- First rally: 1984 Acropolis Rally
- Last rally: 1989 Rally Australia

Saeed Al-Hajri (born 14 April 1950), called The King of Dunes, is a Qatari rally driver.

== Biography ==
Al-Harji was born in Doha, Qatar. In the 1980s, he served as President of the Qatar Automobile club.

Al-Hajri is the winner of the first two editions of the Middle East Rally Championship, he won 18 international victories in rallies (MERC 11), and is also the first Arab to win points in the European and worldwide championships of Rally.

Al-Hajri's team was the Rothmans Porsche Rally Team from 1983 to 1986, 1987 with Audi Quattro, and the Rothmans Ford Team from 1989 to 1990.

In June 1986, Al-Hajri finished fourth at the Acropolis Rally of the World Rally Championship, arguably the greatest achievement of his career up to that point.

== History ==
- Double champion of the Middle East Rally FIA (MORC) in 1984 and 1985 in the Porsche 911 SC RS;
- Double champion of the Persian Gulf rallies in 1983 and 1984, in a Porsche 911 SC RS;
- Champion of the Middle East Rally in 1984, in a Porsche 911 SC RS;
- 1983, 1984, 1985, 1987, 1989 and 1992: Rally of Qatar;
- 1983, 1985 and 1986: Jordan Rally;
- 1984: Rally of Dubai;
- 1985: winner of Pharaoh's Rally in Egypt in a Porsche 959
- 1993: Rally of Tunisia on Mitsubishi with his French co-driver Henri Magne);
- 2007: Rally Transsibérie;
- 2nd of the MERC Rally of Lebanon in 1988, in a Ford Sierra Cosworth with his copilot and brother Mubarak Al-Hajri;
- 4th of the ERC Cyprus Rally in 1983 on Opel Ascona 400 with his copilot John Spiller;
- 4th of the WRC Acropolis Rally in 1986 in a Porsche 911 SC RS with his copilot J. Spiller;
- 5th of the WRC Acropolis Rally in 1985 in a Porsche 911 SC RS with his copilot J. Spiller;
- 6th of Paris-Dakar rally in 2002, at age 52, on Mitsubishi with his co-driver Matthew Stevenson;
- 8th of the 1989 WRC Rally of New Zealand in a Ford Sierra MK1 with his co-driver Steve Bond.

== Racing record ==
=== Complete WRC results ===
| Year | Entrant | Car | 1 | 2 | 3 | 4 | 5 | 6 | 7 | 8 | 9 | 10 | 11 | 12 | 13 | WDC | Pts |
|---|---|---|---|---|---|---|---|---|---|---|---|---|---|---|---|---|---|
| 1984 | Rothmans Porsche Rally Team | Porsche 911 SC RS | MON | SWE | POR | KEN | FRA | GRC; Ret | NZL | ARG | FIN | ITA | CIV | GBR; 17 | | NC | 0 |
| 1985 | Rothmans Porsche Rally Team | Porsche 911 SC RS | MON | SWE | POR | KEN | FRA | GRC; 5 | NZL | ARG | FIN | ITA | CIV | GBR | | 25th | 8 |
| 1986 | Rothmans Porsche Rally Team | Porsche 911 SC RS | MON | SWE | POR | KEN | FRA | GRE; 4 | NZL | ARG | FIN | CIV | ITA | GBR | USA | 22nd | 10 |
| 1989 | Rothmans Ford | Ford Sierra RS Cosworth | SWE | MON | POR | KEN | FRA | GRC | NZL; 8 | ARG | FIN | AUS; Ret | ITA | CIV | GBR | 58th | 3 |

Sporting positions
| Preceded by inaugural | Middle East Rally Champion; 1984-85 | Succeeded by Mohammed bin Sulayem |
