= Jordan Rally =

Motorsport competition held in Jordan

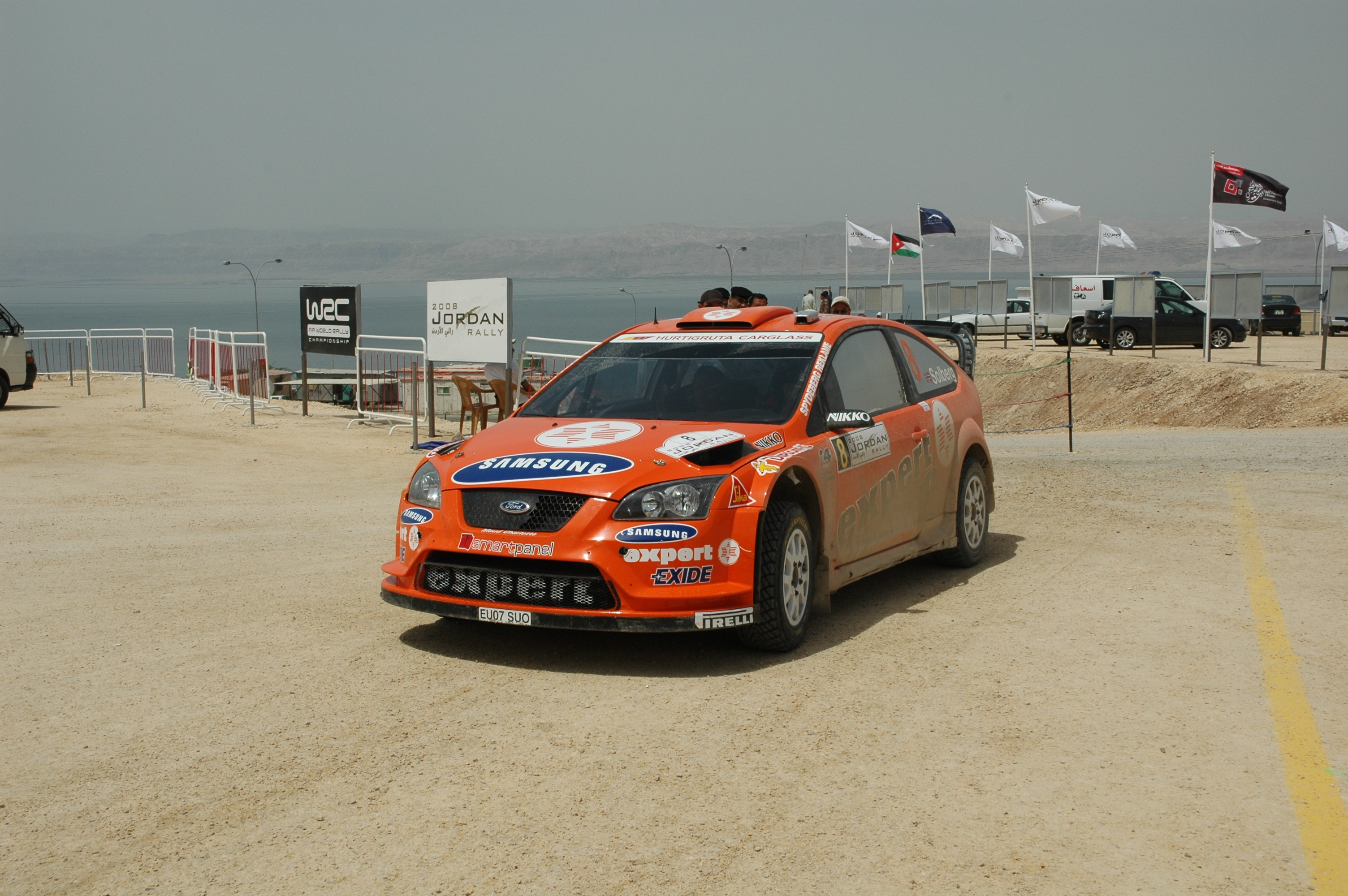
Henning Solberg after a stage in 2008.

The Jordan Rally (Arabic: رالي الأردن) is a rallying competition held in Jordan. It was a new addition to the FIA World Rally Championship (WRC) calendar for the 2008 season, and the first occurrence of a WRC event in the Middle East. The rally was previously part of the Middle East Rally Championship (MERC). The 2008 rally was held from 24 to 27 April.

== Stages ==
The 2008 Jordan Rally had 21 stages centred on the Dead Sea area (in 40 km radius). The stages all fell within a 75 km area. All stages except one had sections below sea level.

The service area was constructed from scratch, involving the Jordan's Army and Ministry of Housing Public Works. An area of 50 thousand square meters was to be dedicated to the purpose of this WRC event, one of the biggest sporting events Jordan has ever held.

== Winners ==
Edition	Year	Championship	Driver	Co-driver	Car
1st	1981		(Lebanon) Michel Saleh	(Lebanon) Tony Samia	Toyota Celica GT
2nd	1982		(Lebanon) Michel Saleh	(Lebanon) Tony Samia	Toyota Celica GT
3rd	1983	MERC	(Qatar) Saeed Al-Hajiri	(United Kingdom) John Spiller	Opel Manta 400
4th	1984	MERC	(United Arab Emirates) Mohammed Bin Sulayem	(United Arab Emirates) Hasan Bin Shadour	Toyota Celica Twin Cam Turbo
5th	1985	MERC	(Qatar) Saeed Al-Hajiri	(United Kingdom) John Spiller	Porsche 911 SC RS
6th	1986	MERC	(Qatar) Saeed Al-Hajiri	(United Kingdom) John Spiller	Porsche 911 SC RS
7th	1987	MERC	(United Arab Emirates) Mohammed Bin Sulayem	(United Kingdom) John Spiller	Toyota Celica Twin Cam Turbo
8th	1988	MERC	(United Arab Emirates) Mohammed Bin Sulayem	(Republic of Ireland) Ronan Morgan	Toyota Celica Twin Cam Turbo
9th	1990	MERC	(United Arab Emirates) Mohammed Bin Sulayem	(Republic of Ireland) Ronan Morgan	Toyota Celica GT-Four ST165
10th	1992	MERC	(Qatar) Abbas Al-Mosawi	(Republic of Ireland) Benny Smythe	Toyota Celica GT-Four ST165
11th	1993	MERC	(Qatar) Sheikh Hammad Al-Thani	(Qatar) Abdullah Al Mari	Mitsubishi Galant VR-4
12th	1994	MERC	(United Arab Emirates) Mohammed Bin Sulayem	(United Kingdom) Phil Mills	Ford Escort RS Cosworth
13th	1995	MERC	(Saudi Arabia) Abdullah Bakhashab	(Republic of Ireland) Bobby Willis	Ford Escort RS Cosworth
14th	1996	MERC	(United Arab Emirates) Mohammed Bin Sulayem	(Republic of Ireland) Ronan Morgan	Ford Escort RS Cosworth
15th	1997	MERC	(United Arab Emirates) Mohammed Bin Sulayem	(Republic of Ireland) Ronan Morgan	Ford Escort RS Cosworth
16th	1998	MERC	(United Arab Emirates) Mohammed Bin Sulayem	(Republic of Ireland) Ronan Morgan	Ford Escort WRC
17th	1999	MERC	(United Arab Emirates) Mohammed Bin Sulayem	(Republic of Ireland) Ronan Morgan	Ford Escort WRC
18th	2000	MERC	(United Arab Emirates) Mohammed Bin Sulayem	(Republic of Ireland) Ronan Morgan	Ford Focus RS WRC
19th	2001	MERC	(United Arab Emirates) Mohammed Bin Sulayem	(Jordan) Khalid Zakaria	Ford Focus RS WRC
20th	2002	MERC	(United Arab Emirates) Mohammed Bin Sulayem	(United Kingdom) John Spiller	Ford Focus RS WRC
21st	2003	MERC	(Qatar) Nasser Al-Attiyah	(United Kingdom) Steve Lancaster	Subaru Impreza WRC
22nd	2004	MERC	(Jordan) Amjad Farrah	(Jordan) Khalid Zakaria	Mitsubishi Lancer Evo VII
23rd	2005	MERC	(Qatar) Nasser Al-Attiyah	(United Kingdom) Chris Patterson	Subaru Impreza WRX STi
24th	2006	MERC	(Qatar) Nasser Al-Attiyah	(United Kingdom) Chris Patterson	Subaru Impreza WRC
25th	2007	MERC	(United Arab Emirates) Khalid Al-Qassimi	(United Kingdom) Michael Orr	Subaru Impreza WRC
26th	2008	WRC	(Finland) Mikko Hirvonen	(Finland) Jarmo Lehtinen	Ford Focus RS WRC 07
27th	2009	MERC	(Qatar) Nasser Al-Attiyah	(Italy) Giovanni Bernacchini	Subaru Impreza WRX N15
28th	2010	WRC	(France) Sébastien Loeb	(Monaco) Daniel Elena	Citroën C4 WRC
29th	2011	WRC	(France) Sébastien Ogier	(France) Julien Ingrassia	Citroën DS3 WRC
30th	2012	MERC	(Qatar) Nasser Al-Attiyah	(Italy) Giovanni Bernacchini	Ford Fiesta RRC
31st	2013	MERC	(Qatar) Nasser Al-Attiyah	(Italy) Giovanni Bernacchini	Ford Fiesta RRC
32nd	2014	MERC	(Qatar) Nasser Al-Attiyah	(Italy) Giovanni Bernacchini	Ford Fiesta RRC
33rd	2015	MERC	(Qatar) Nasser Al-Attiyah	(France) Matthieu Baumel	Ford Fiesta RRC
34th	2016	MERC	(Qatar) Nasser Al-Attiyah	(France) Matthieu Baumel	Škoda Fabia R5
35th	2017	MERC	(Qatar) Nasser Al-Attiyah	(France) Matthieu Baumel	Ford Fiesta R5
36th	2018	MERC	(Qatar) Nasser Al-Attiyah	(France) Matthieu Baumel	Ford Fiesta R5
37th	2019	MERC	(Qatar) Nasser Al-Attiyah	(France) Matthieu Baumel	Volkswagen Polo GTI R5
38th	2021	MERC	(Qatar) Nasser Al-Attiyah	(France) Matthieu Baumel	Volkswagen Polo GTI R5
39th	2022	MERC	(Qatar) Nasser Al-Attiyah	(France) Matthieu Baumel	Volkswagen Polo GTI R5
