= Mohammed Ben Sulayem =

Emirati rally driver and FIA president (born 1961)

- محمد بن سُلَيم
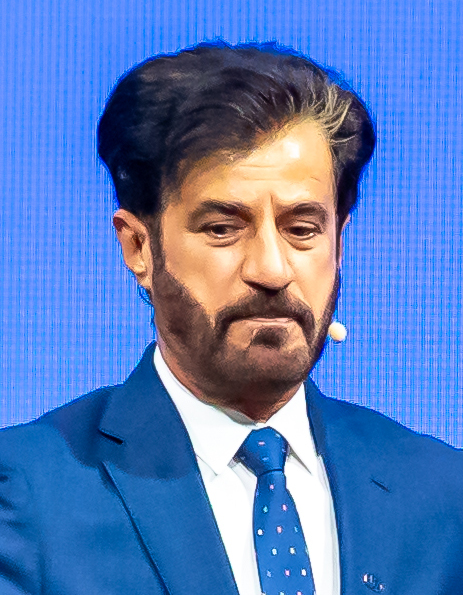
- Sulayem in 2024

President of Fédération Internationale de l'Automobile
- Incumbent
- Assumed office 17 December 2021
- Preceded by: Jean Todt

Personal details
- Born: Mohammed Ahmad Sultan Ben Sulayem; 12 November 1961 (age 65) Dubai, Trucial States
- Relations: Sultan Ahmed bin Sulayem (brother)

Middle East Rally Championship
- Years active: 1983–2002
- Teams: Ford, Toyota

Championship titles
- 1986–1991, 1994, 1996–2002: Middle East Rally Championship

World Rally Championship record
- Years active: 1988, 1990–1995
- Co-driver: (Republic of Ireland) Ronan Morgan
- Teams: Toyota, Ford
- Rallies: 23
- Championships: 0
- Rally wins: 0
- Podiums: 0
- Stage wins: 0
- Total points: 12
- First rally: 1988 Acropolis Rally
- Last rally: 1995 Rally Australia

Mohammed Ahmad Sultan Ben Sulayem (Arabic: محمد بن سليم; born 12 November 1961) is an Emirati former rally driver and motorsports executive who serves as president of the Fédération Internationale de l'Automobile (FIA), the governing body of many auto racing events including Formula One.

Ben Sulayem began his career as a rally driver in the 1980s. He became one of the most successful Middle East Rally Championship drivers, winning 14 titles.

In 2005, Ben Sulayem became the President of the Emirates Motorsports Organization, the representative of the United Arab Emirates in the FIA. In 2008, he was elected as a Vice President for sport and a member of the FIA World Motor Sport Council. He was key to organizing the first Abu Dhabi Grand Prix in 2009. In 2012, he was among the founding members and chairman of FIA sub-region of Arab Council of Touring and Automobile Clubs. In December 2021, he was appointed as FIA President, succeeding Jean Todt.

As President of the FIA, Ben Sulayem oversaw the restructuring of race control in 2022. In 2024, Ben Sulayem was subject to whistleblower complaints involving the certification of the Las Vegas Strip Circuit, and attempting to intervene in the results of the 2023 Saudi Arabian Grand Prix. In 2025, he was criticized for driver punishments regarding misconduct and poor governance.

In September 2024, Ben Sulayem was appointed as UN Tourism's Ambassador for Sustainable Tourism in the Sport category in recognition of his efforts in integrating sustainability into global motorsport.

== Early life and education ==
Sulayem was born on 12 November 1961 in Dubai, Trucial States (now United Arab Emirates). He studied business at American University in Washington, D.C. where he graduated with a bachelor's degree.

== Racing career ==
Ben Sulayem competed in the Middle East Rally Championship driving for Toyota and Ford. He won his first title in 1986 with a Toyota Celica and went on to win six consecutive titles through to 1991. In 1994, he won his seventh title with a Ford Escort RS Cosworth. From 1996 to 2002, Ben Sulayem won a further seven titles with Ford, making him the most successful driver in the championship with over 60 wins and 14 titles (both the records have since been broken by Nasser Al-Attiyah).

== Administrative career ==
In 2005, Ben Sulayem became the President of the Emirates Motorsports Organization, the representative of the UAE in FIA. In 2008, he was elected as a Vice President for sport and a member of the FIA World Motor Sport Council, and he was key to organizing the first Abu Dhabi Grand Prix in 2009. In 2012, he was among the founding members and chairman of FIA sub-region of Arab Council of Touring and Automobile Clubs.

In June 2013, Ben Sulayem was appointed as the chairman of the new Motor Sport Development Task Force set up by the FIA to build a ten-year plan for the sport's global development. In December 2021, he was appointed as the FIA President succeeding Jean Todt.

== FIA president ==
In December 2021, Ben Sulayem was appointed as FIA President, succeeding Jean Todt.

Ben Sulayem stood unopposed for reelection in December 2025 and won another four-year mandate. No other candidates were allowed to run, due to an FIA technicality. All candidates for president were required to name a potential vice-president from each of the FIA global regions. However, there was only one accredited vice-presidential pick from South America, Fabiana Ecclestone, who supported Ben Sulayem. This meant all other candidates were blocked from running in the election.

The process is currently under litigation and an initial court hearing is set for 16 February 2026.

=== Restructuring of race control ===
In 2022, Ben Sulayem oversaw the investigation into the controversial ending of the 2021 Abu Dhabi Grand Prix. The race ended with a last lap shootout when the Race Director (Michael Masi) brought in the safety car on the same lap as allowing lapped cars to unlap themselves. This was in breach of F1 regulations, which require the safety car to stay out for an additional lap after releasing lapped cars. The investigation concluded that there was no mechanism to change the results. However, the FIA President has the power to refer to the FIA International Court of Appeal (ICA) for them to decide whether the result was legitimate. This option is available until at least March 2027.

Ben Sulayem replaced Michael Masi as race director with Niels Wittich and Eduardo Freitas in an effort to modernize race operations and restore public trust.

=== Controversies ===
==== Whistleblower complaints ====
On 5 March 2024, the FIA confirmed its compliance officer received two whistleblower complaints. The whistleblower stated that Ben Sulayem told FIA officials to declare the Las Vegas Strip Circuit unsafe for racing and not certify the circuit for the 2023 race. Ben Sulayem was also investigated for allegedly attempting to intervene in the results of the 2023 Saudi Arabian Grand Prix.

==== Driver swearing punishments ====
In November 2024, Ben Sulayem faced criticism by the Grand Prix Drivers Association (GPDA) after both Max Verstappen and Charles Leclerc received punishment for swearing in FIA press conferences. Verstappen received an FIA community service order ahead of the 2024 Singapore Grand Prix, whilst Leclerc received a €10,000 fine. The GPDA responded with an open letter.

In 2025, Ben Sulayem was criticized for the change in the International Sporting Code, which imposed guidelines of language and misconduct, stating that language or action resulting in the "moral injury or loss to the FIA, its bodies, its members or its executive officers" can be punished in the form of fines, deduction of championship points and suspensions, depending on the frequency of said breaches. Similar to the GPDA, World Rally Championship drivers formed the World Rally Drivers Alliance (WoRDA) after driver Adrien Fourmaux received a €10,000 fine for swearing during an interview after the conclusion of Rally Sweden. The alliance protested by refusing to speak in interviews or only speak in their mother tongue to explain their decision during Safari Rally Kenya.

==== Governance issues ====
At the direction of Ben Sulayem, the FIA has taken steps to limit accountability. Multiple senior officials within the FIA have either resigned or been fired after investigating and raising concerns with his governance of the organisation. In November 2024, two members of the audit committee were fired after expressing concerns with Ben Sulayem's creation of a $1.5 million fund for FIA member clubs, who also vote in the presidential elections. F1 race director Niels Wittich 'stepped down' in the same month but later clarified that it was not his decision. Following an investigation into allegations that Ben Sulayem tried to interfere in the operations of two races in 2023, Paolo Basarri, the head of compliance who compiled a report on it, was fired. Tim Mayer, a steward for 15 years, who along with deputy Formula 2 race director Janette Tan were sacked in the same month, warned that the FIA was running out of people to do jobs.

In February 2025, the Chair of Motorsport UK, David Richards, and the FIA Deputy President for Sport, Robert Reid, were barred from a World Motor Sport Council meeting after refusing to sign a non-disclosure agreement (NDA). Motorsport UK and Richards subsequently threatened the FIA with legal action, while Reid resigned from his post in April 2025, citing "a fundamental breakdown in governance standards within motorsport's global governing body". Following the news of Reid's resignation, former CEO of the FIA, Natalie Robyn, who was forced to resign in May 2024 following disagreements with Ben Sulayem, said that there were "serious ongoing structural challenges" within the organisation.

An article from BBC stated that FIA insiders speculated that the NDA requirement was introduced by Ben Sulayem to avoid negative press around possible changes to FIA statutes, which would make it harder for anyone to stand against him in the FIA elections later in the year. In May 2025, BBC reported that they had obtained a copy of the proposed changes that were to be voted on the following month. One change seeks to ban candidates for president who have anything in their record "that calls into question their professional integrity", which is speculated to be targeted at Carlos Sainz Sr, who has declared interest in running for president and whose son Carlos Sainz Jr. competes in Formula One. Among the other changes include giving the president power to pick all members of the FIA senate, without oversight from other members of the senate, preventing more than two members of the same nationality from being elected to the World Motor Sport Council, and bringing forward the date of presidential candidates to declare their teams from 21 days before to 49 days before the election. All these changes are said to make it easier for the president and his allies to exclude potential challengers ahead of the 2025 elections.

On 18 June 2025, Sara Mariani, the head of sustainability, diversity and inclusion at the FIA, was sacked. On leaving, she left a note saying, "there is a life outside the FIA. A life where talent and dedication are rewarded. Where women in leadership positions can thrive, feel valued and respected."

Following the increased power given to the president to pick members of the senate, Ben Sulayem removed the UK's FIA senate representative, Ben Cussons, and replaced him with Anar Alakbarov, a loyalist from Azerbaijan. Cussons had previously disagreed with Ben Sulayem over the requirement to sign an NDA.

Swiss driver and FIA presidential candidate Laura Villars sued the FIA over 'serious democratic failings' after every candidacy bar Ben Sulayem's was declared ineligible. Fellow presidential candidate Tim Mayer, who was sacked by Ben Sulayem in 2024, also lent his support to the lawsuit after he was forced to end his campaign due to similar issues. Villars is seeking to suspend the election until a ruling has been made in the case.

== Personal life ==
Sulayem is a prominent car collector and owns multiple supercars including Koenigsegg Agera RS, Koenigsegg Regera, Koenigsegg Chimera, Mercedes-Benz, Ferrari, Porsche, McLaren, Bugatti, Jaguar, Lexus, Ford GT, Lamborghini, and Rolls-Royce.

In July 2012, he was awarded the honorary degree of Doctor of Science from the University of Ulster in recognition of his services to sport, civic leadership and charity.

On 7 March 2023, one of Ben Sulayem's sons, Saif Ben Sulayem, died in a road accident in Dubai.

=== Controversy ===
In January 2023, The Times newspaper resurfaced comments Ben Sulayem made on his now archived website from 2001. The newspaper quoted Sulayem as saying he did not like "women who think they are smarter than men, for they are not in truth." The veracity of the quotes was not refuted by Sulayem. The FIA defended him saying "the remarks in this archived website from 2001 do not reflect the president's beliefs."

== Honors ==
- 14 x Middle East Rally Championship (1986–1991, 1994, 1996–2002)

=== Individual ===
Individual honors won include:

- Medal of Honour, King Hussein of Jordan (1986)
- President's Cup, President Amine Gemayel of Lebanon (1987)
- Medal of Honour, President Emile Lahoud of Lebanon (1999)
- Medal of Honour, King Abdullah II of Jordan (1999)
- Medal of Honour, King Hamad bin Isa al-Khalifa of Bahrain (2004)
- UAE Sportsman of the Century, Agence France-Presse (AFP)

== Racing record ==
=== Complete WRC results ===
Year	Entrant	Car	1	2	3	4	5	6	7	8	9	10	11	12	13	14	WDC	Points
1988	Marlboro Middle East Rally Team	Ford Sierra RS Cosworth	MON	SWE	POR	KEN	FRA	GRC; Ret	USA	NZL	ARG	FIN	CIV	ITA	GBR		NC	0
1990	Winston Toyota Team Middle East	Toyota Celica GT-Four ST165	MON	POR	KEN	FRA	GRC; Ret	NZL	ARG	FIN	AUS	ITA	CIV	GBR			NC	0
1991	Toyota Team Europe	Toyota Celica GT-Four ST165	MON	SWE	POR	KEN	FRA	GRC	NZL	ARG; 7	FIN	AUS	ITA	CIV	ESP	GBR	40th	4
1992	Marlboro Team Ford	Ford Sierra RS Cosworth 4X4	MON	SWE	POR; 20	KEN	FRA	GRC; Ret	NZL; Ret	ARG	FIN	AUS; 14	ITA; Ret	CIV	ESP; 9	GBR	58th	2
1993	Marlboro Team Ford	Ford Escort RS Cosworth	MON	SWE; Ret	POR; Ret	KEN	FRA	GRC; Ret	ARG; 6	NZL	FIN	AUS	ITA; 17	ESP; Ret	GBR		31st	6
1994	Marlboro Team Ford	Ford Escort RS Cosworth	MON	POR; Ret	KEN	FRA; 21	GRC; Ret	ARG	NZL	FIN	ITA	GBR					NC	0
1995	Marlboro Toyota Grifone	Toyota Celica GT-Four ST205	MON	SWE; 26	POR; Ret	FRA; 21	NZL; Ret	AUS; Ret	ESP	GBR							NC	0

Sporting positions
Preceded by Jean Todt	President of the Fédération Internationale de l'Automobile; 2021–present	Succeeded by Incumbent
Preceded by Saeed Al-Hajri	Middle East Rally Champion; 1986–1991	Succeeded by Mamdouh Khayat
Preceded by Hamed Al-Thani	Middle East Rally Champion; 1994	Succeeded by Abdullah Bakhashab
Preceded by Abdullah Bakhashab	Middle East Rally Champion; 1996–2002	Succeeded by Nasser Al-Attiyah
