= Abdulaziz Al-Kuwari =

Qatari rally driver (born 1979)

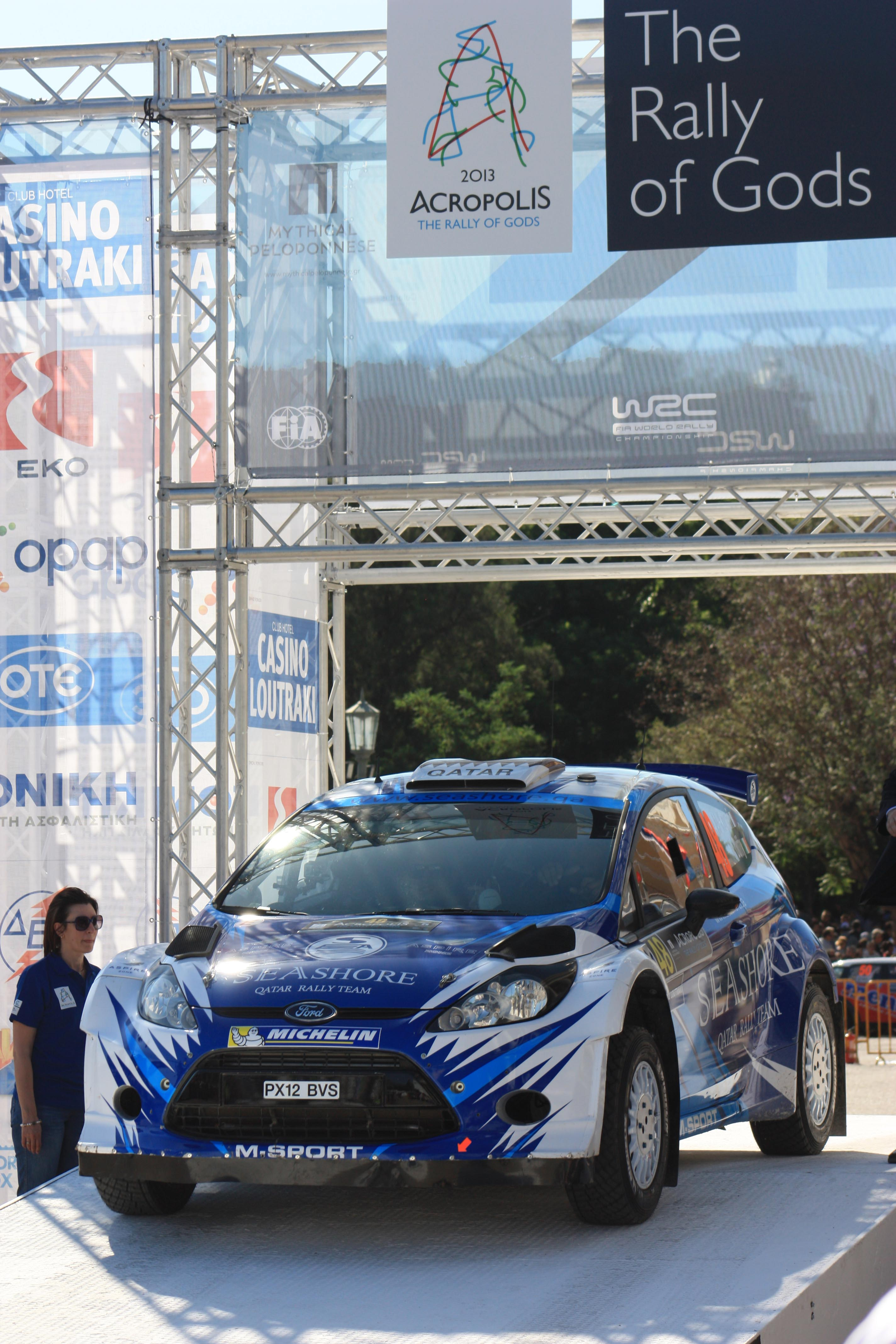

Personal information
- Nationality: (Qatar) Qatari
- Born: 13 November 1979 (age 47)

World Rally Championship record
- Years active: 2012 – present
- Co-driver: (Republic of Ireland) Killian Duffy
- Rallies: 23
- Championships: 0
- Rally wins: 0
- Podiums: 0
- Stage wins: 0
- Total points: 9
- First rally: 2012 Acropolis Rally
- Last updated on: 24 January 2017.

Abdulaziz Al-Kuwari (born 13 November 1979) is a Qatari rally driver. He made his World Rally Championship (WRC) debut on the 2012 Acropolis Rally, scoring a point with a tenth-place finish.

In January 2012, Al-Kuwari won the Qatar International Rally, a round of the Middle East Rally Championship, on his first outing in a Mini John Cooper Works S2000. He switched to a Mini John Cooper Works WRC for his WRC debut on the Acropolis Rally in May, entered by the Seashore Qatar Rally Team. He finished the rally in tenth place, becoming the first driver since Sébastien Ogier in 2008 Rally México to score points on their maiden WRC appearance.

== Career results ==
=== Complete World Rally Championship results ===
Year	Entrant	Car	1	2	3	4	5	6	7	8	9	10	11	12	13	14	WDC	Pts
2012	Seashore Qatar Rally Team	Mini John Cooper Works WRC	MON	SWE	MEX	POR	ARG	GRE; 10	NZL	FIN	GER	GBR	FRA	ITA	ESP; 14		29th	1
2013	Seashore Qatar Rally Team	Ford Fiesta RRC	MON	SWE	MEX; 12	POR; 16	ARG; 13	GRE; 13	ITA; 11	FIN	GER	AUS; 10	FRA		GBR; WD		28th	2
2013	Seashore Qatar Rally Team	Ford Fiesta RS WRC												ESP; 10			28th	2
2014	Puma Rally Team	Ford Fiesta RRC	MON	SWE	MEX	POR; 17	ARG; 14	ITA; Ret	POL	FIN	GER	AUS	FRA	ESP	GBR		NC	0
2015	Youth & Sports Qatar Rally Team	Ford Fiesta RRC	MON	SWE	MEX; 11	ARG; 7	POR; 16	ITA; 11	POL	FIN	GER	AUS; 12	FRA	ESP; 23	GBR; 16		17th	6
2016	Culture & Sport Qatar Rally Team	Škoda Fabia R5	MON	SWE	MEX; Ret	ARG; 14	POR; 17	ITA	POL	FIN	GER; 24	CHN	FRA	ESP	GBR	AUS	NC	0

==== WRC-2 results ====
Year	Entrant	Car	1	2	3	4	5	6	7	8	9	10	11	12	13	Pos.	Pts
2013	Seashore Qatar Rally Team	Ford Fiesta RRC	MON	SWE	MEX; 1	POR; 5	ARG; 1	GRE; 3	ITA; 2	FIN	GER	AUS; 1	FRA	ESP	GBR; WD	2nd	118
2014	Puma Rally Team	Ford Fiesta RRC	MON	SWE	MEX	POR; 7	ARG; 5	ITA; Ret	POL	FIN	GER	AUS	FRA	ESP	GBR	20th	16
2015	Youth & Sports Qatar Rally Team	Ford Fiesta RRC	MON	SWE	MEX; 4	ARG; 1	POR; 6	ITA; 4	POL	FIN	GER	AUS; 3	FRA	ESP; 8	GBR; 4	5th	84
2016	Culture & Sport Qatar Rally Team	Škoda Fabia R5	MON	SWE	MEX; Ret	ARG; 3	POR; 8	ITA	POL	FIN	GER; 10	FRA	ESP	GBR	AUS	15th	20
