= Off-roading =

Activity of driving on unsurfaced roads or tracks

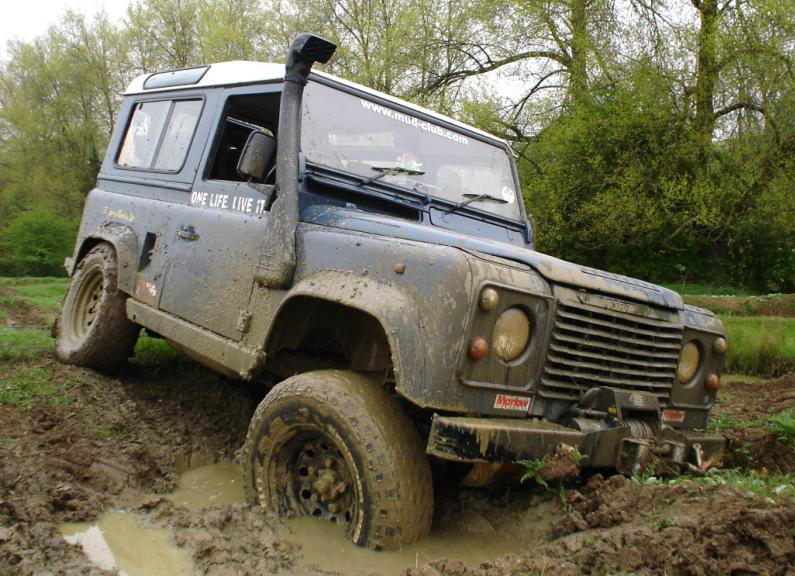
A Land Rover Defender 90 off-roading

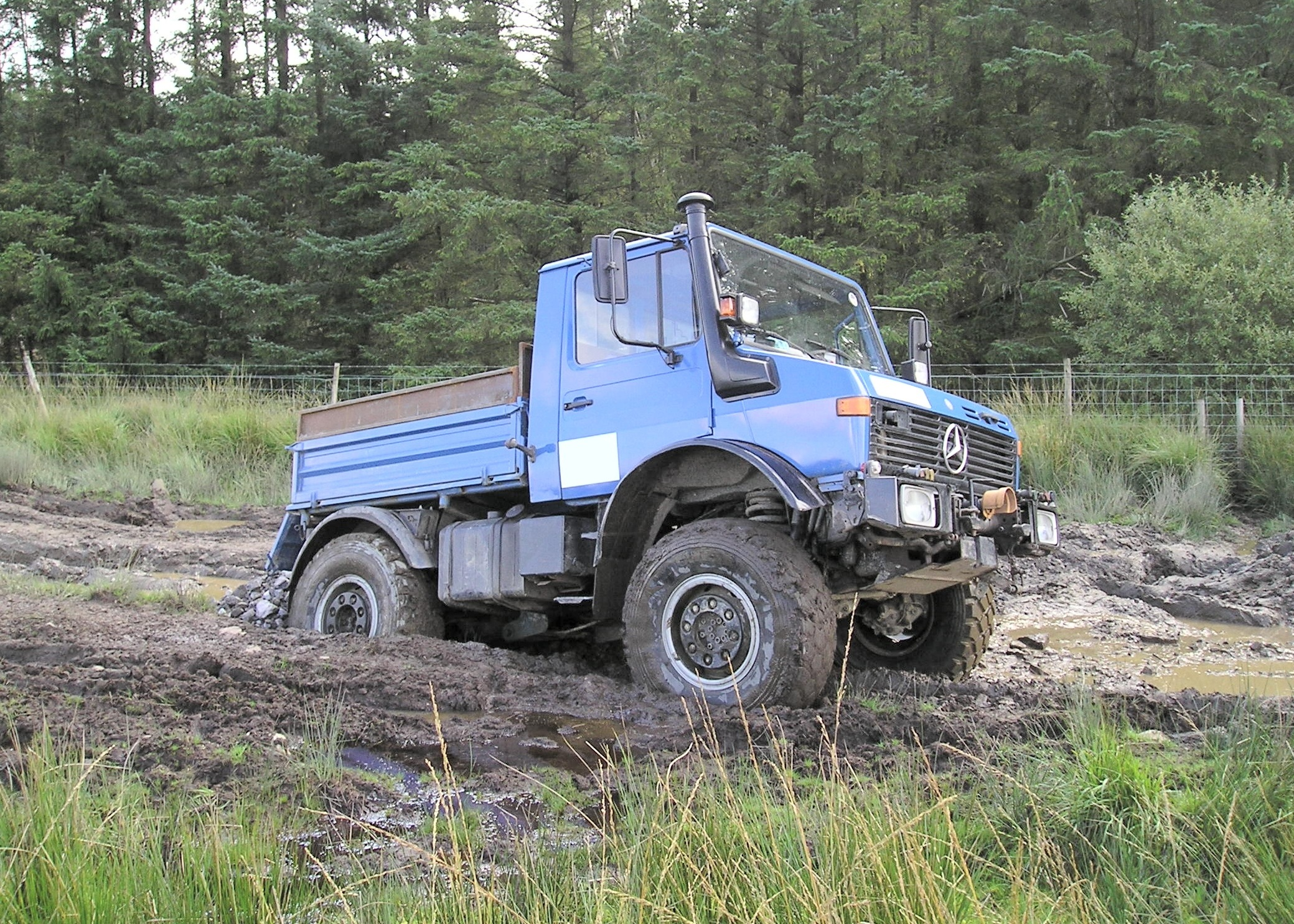
A Unimog U1600 off-roading

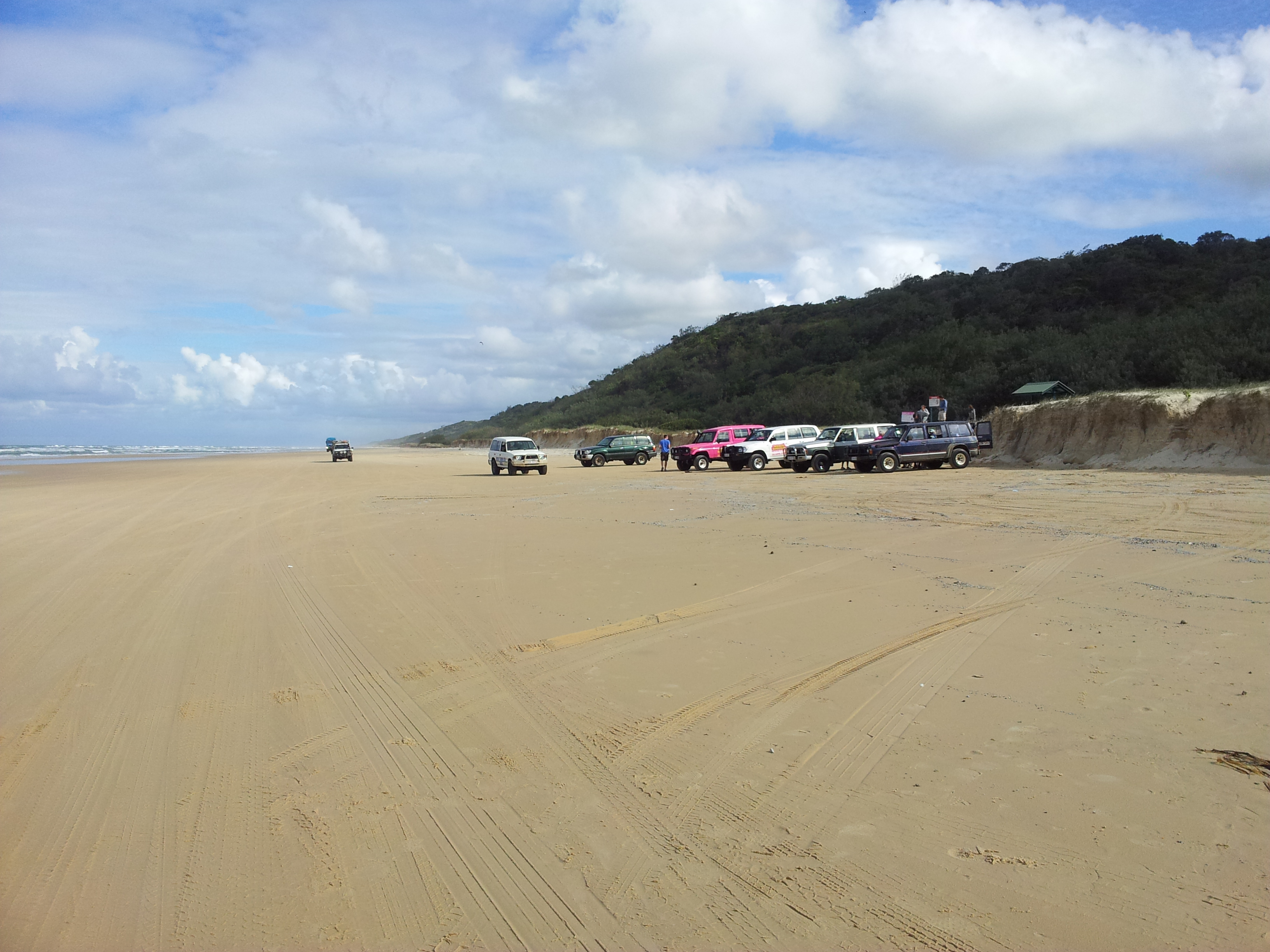
4WDs at Fraser Island beach, Australia

Off-roading is the act of driving or riding in a vehicle on unpaved surfaces such as sand, dirt, gravel, riverbeds, mud, snow, rocks, or other natural terrain. Off-roading ranges from casual drives with regular vehicles to competitive events with customized vehicles and skilled drivers.

== Off-road vehicle ==
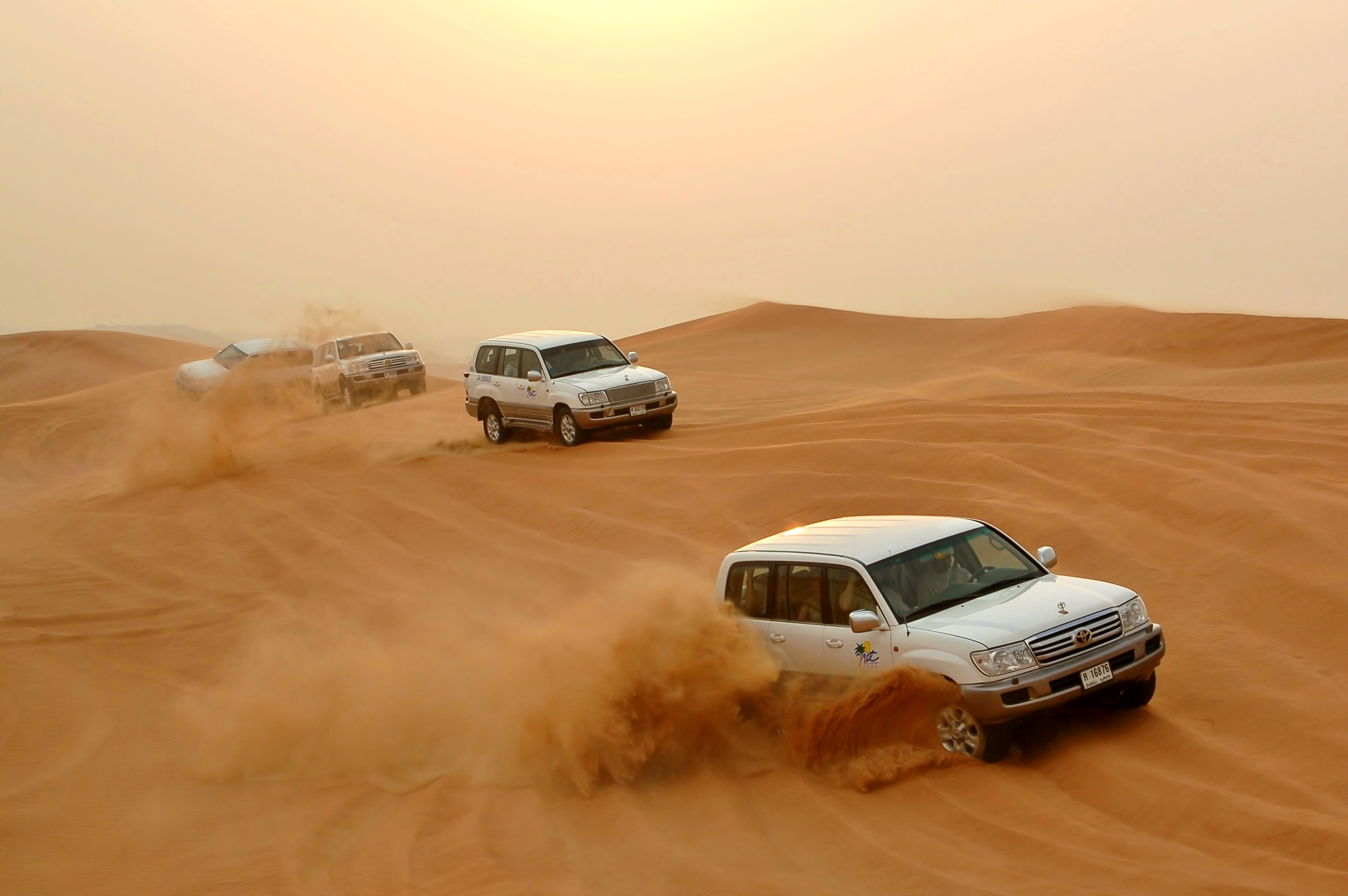
Off-roading in Dubai, UAE.

Off-road vehicles are either capable of or specifically developed for off-road driving. These vehicles often have features designed specifically for use in off-road conditions such as suspension lifts, off-road tires, skid plates, snorkels, roll cages, or strengthened drivetrains.

=== Tools ===
- Recovery board
- High lift jack
- Snatch strap

== Types of recreational off-roading ==
=== Dune bashing ===
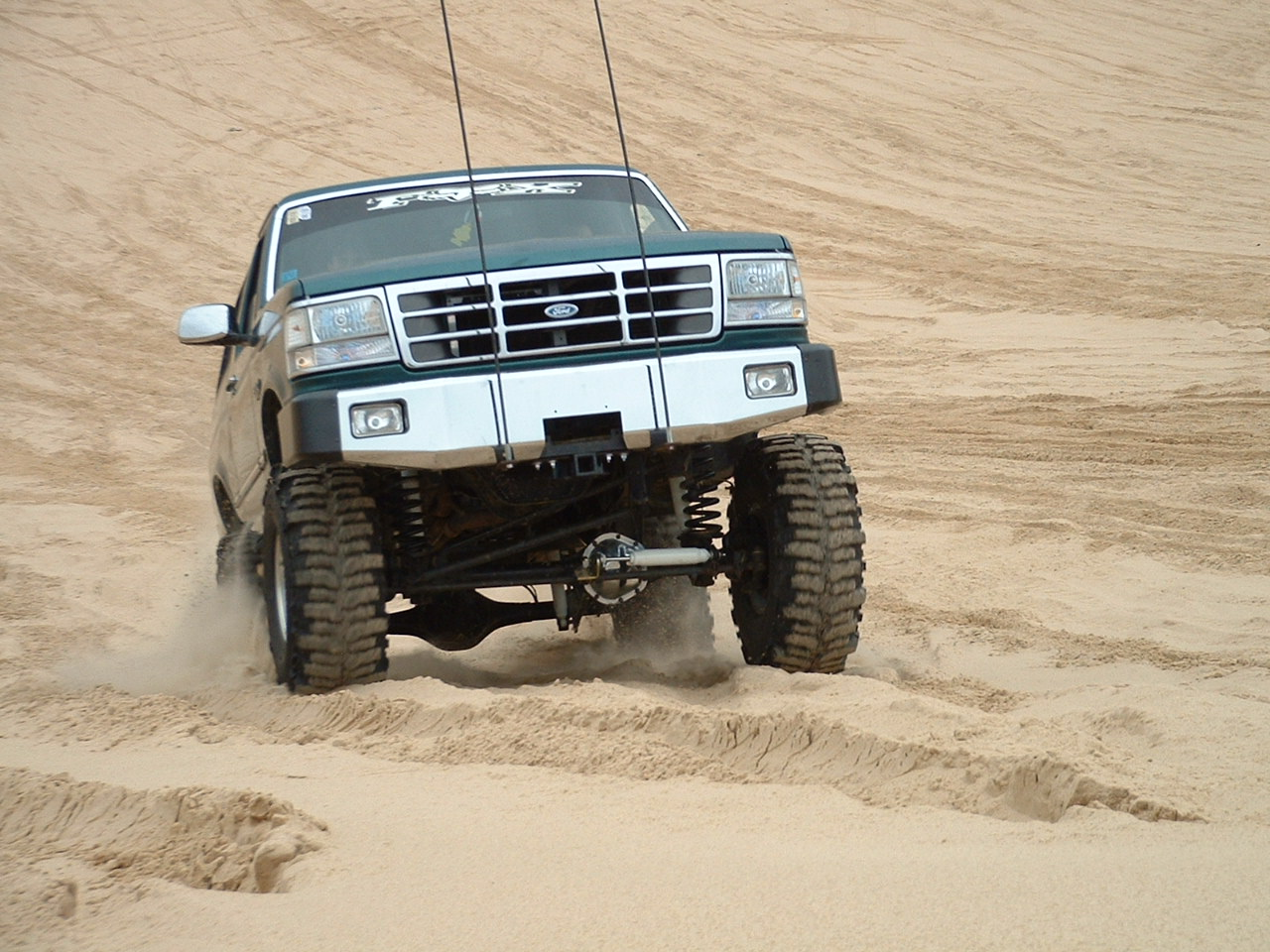
A 5th-generation Ford Bronco dune bashing

Dune bashing is a specific form of off-roading performed on sand dunes.

Dune buggies, sport-utility vehicles, and ATVs are often used.. Vehicles driven on sand dunes are often equipped with a roll cage for safety in the case of an overturn. The tire pressure is often reduced to gain more traction by increasing the footprint of the tire and lowering the ground pressure of the vehicle on the sand, comparable to a person wearing snowshoes to walk on snow without sinking. Some cars are equipped with beadlock wheels, which allow tire pressure to be lowered even further without risking separation of the tire and rim.

Upon entering the desert, it is customary for drivers to meet with a pack of other vehicles and a group leader before proceeding. The group leader then leads the pack through the stunts in a single file line. The rationale for this technique is to prevent drivers from becoming disoriented and getting lost.

== Types of competitive off-roading ==
=== Off-road racing ===
==== Desert racing ====
High-speed racing in the desert includes chases and racing at maximum speed through rough desert terrain with numerous pots and bumps. Drivers often use rear-wheel drive and 4-wheel drive trucks with long-travel suspension and wide stance between the front enlarged tires, which maintains optimal stability at high speed. These types of trucks are often called Trophy trucks or PreRunners.

==== Rock racing ====
Rock racing involves driving over rocks, but unlike rock crawling, does not specify penalties for striking cones, backing up, or winching. In addition, rock racing incorporates a level of high-speed racing (such as rock bouncer) that is not characteristic of rock crawling.

=== Rallying ===
See article: Rally

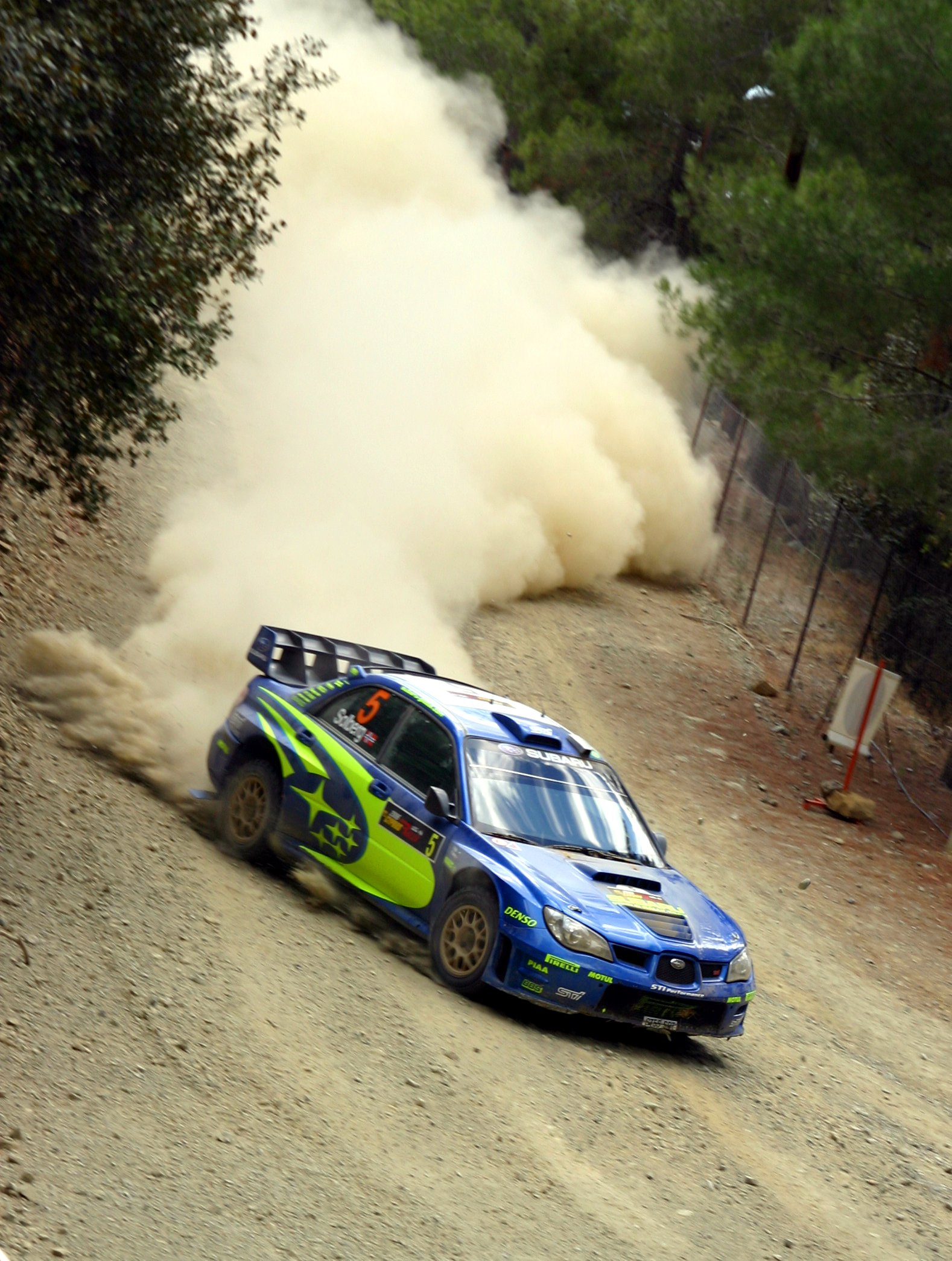
Petter Solberg driving a Subaru Impreza WRC on gravel at the 2006 Cyprus Rally, a World Rally Championship event

Rallying is a wide-ranging form of motorsport with various competitive motoring elements such as speed tests (sometimes called rally racing in the United States), navigation tests, or the ability to reach waypoints or a destination at a prescribed time or average speed. Rallies may be short in the form of trials at a single venue, or several thousand miles long in an cross-country rally.

Depending on the format, rallies may be organised on private or public roads, open or closed to traffic, or off-road in the form of cross country or rally-raid. Competitors can use production vehicles, which must be road-legal if being used on open roads, or specially built competition vehicles suited to crossing specific terrain.

In most cases rallying distinguishes itself from other forms of motorsport by not running directly against other competitors over laps of a circuit, but instead in a point-to-point format in which participants leave at regular intervals from one or more start points.

The FIA World Rally Championship (WRC) is an international rally championship which features notable events such as the Monte Carlo Rally, Rally Finland and Safari Rally. The Dakar Rally is the most notable featuring in the World Rally-Raid Championship (W2RC), an off-road rally raid series.

=== Mudding and mud plugging ===
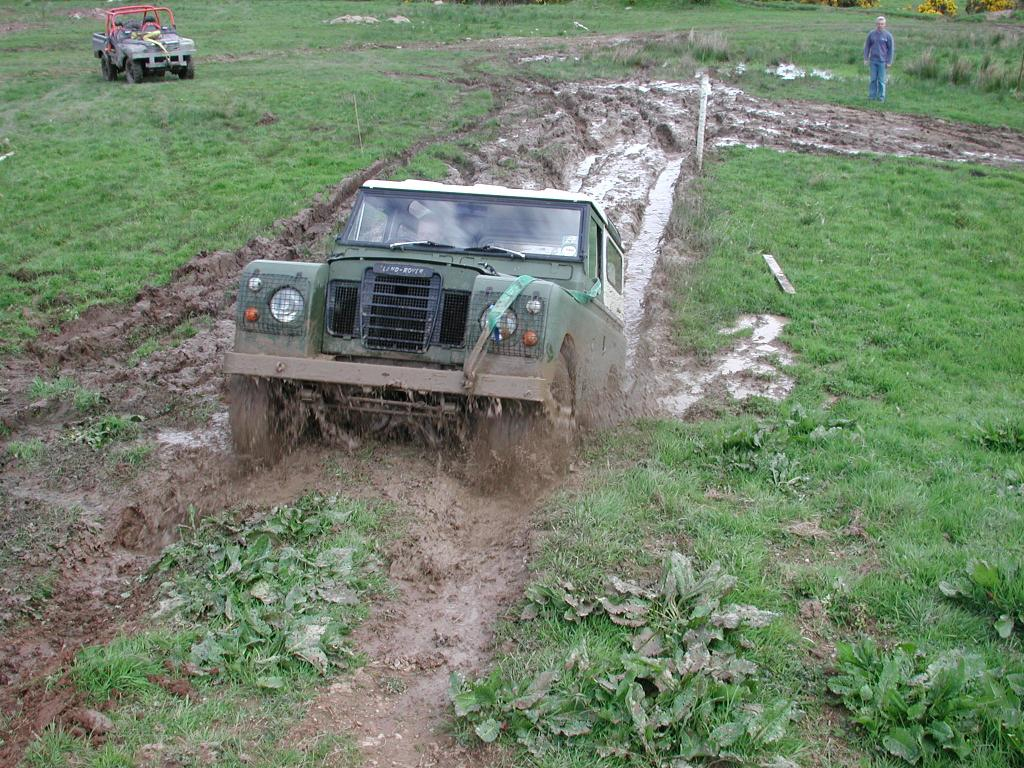
Land Rover Series III mud plugging

Mudding is off-roading through an area of wet mud or clay, leading to extremely low traction and problems with moving forward. The goal is to drive as far as possible without getting stuck. There are many types of tires that are often used for this activity, including balloon tires, mud-terrain tires and paddle tires. The activity is popular in the United States, although it is illegal on public land due to the environmental impact.

Mud plugging, as practiced in the United Kingdom, refers to the motorsport of classic trials, where the main objective is to complete a challenging course of (mostly unpaved) roads and (often muddy, and frequently uphill) off-road terrain.

This form of motorsport is one of the oldest to survive to this day, dating back at least to the 1920s.

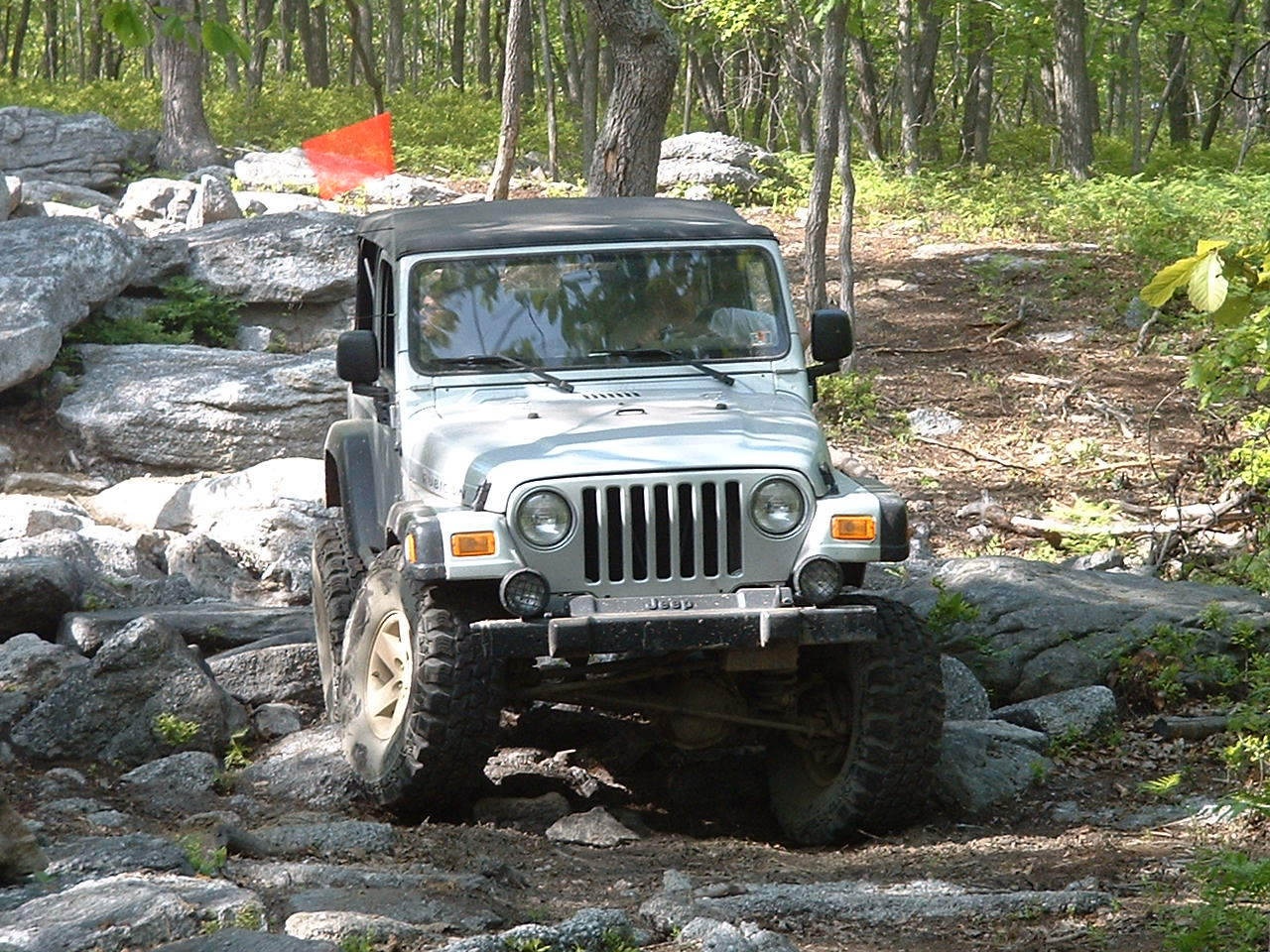
Jeep Rubicon rock crawling

=== Rock crawling ===
Rock crawling involves driving over rocky terrain, with the goal of getting as far as possible with the fewest penalties. Penalties are received for striking cones, using a winch to get unstuck, going out of bounds, and going in reverse. These rules lead to the sport being technical, with drivers having to plan ahead to reduce the penalties they receive. Vehicles used for rock crawling are usually modified with different tires, suspension components that allow greater axle articulation, and changes in the differential gear ratio to obtain characteristics suitable for low-speed operation for traversing obstacles. Commonly, rock crawlers have a "spotter", who is an assistant on foot by the vehicle to provide information about areas out of the driver's field of view.

=== Competitive trials ===
All progress is made at low speed and the emphasis is on skill rather than on finishing first, although trialing can be highly competitive. There are three traditional forms of off-road trialing. During some competitive events, such as the Turkey Run in Idaho and other events around the United States, point systems may be used to determine rewards.

==== RTV trialing ====
RTV (Road Taxed Vehicle) trialing is the most common form of trialing. As the name suggests, it is for vehicles that are road-legal (and thus required to pay road tax). This excludes vehicles that are highly modified or specially built. RTV-class vehicles can carry a wide range of suspension modifications, as well as off-road tires (provided they are road-legal), recovery winches, raised air intakes, etc. Vehicles on RTV trials are usually best described as "modified from standard"—they use the standard chassis, drive-train, and body that the vehicle was built with, but are fitted with a wide array of modifications to assist in the trialing. Whilst modification is not necessarily required for an RTV trial, at the very least the vehicle would be expected to have some underbody and over-the-body protection such as skid plates or roll cages, often made from durable stainless steel, aluminium or mild steel. RTV courses are intended to be non-damaging and driven at little more than a walking pace and a course properly laid out would be drivable without damage. However, the terrain usually includes steep slopes, water, side slopes, deep ruts, and other obstacles that could potentially damage a vehicle if mistakes are made or poor driving techniques are used. As such, the use of modifications can increase the chances of success.

RTV trials usually take place on farmland, a quarry site, or at a dedicated off-road driving center and are usually organized by a dedicated trialing body (such as the All-Wheel Drive Club or the Association of Land Rover clubs in the UK, or by a vehicle owner's club). The course consists of 10 to 12 "gates" marked by two garden canes (sticks) and are vertically placed. The gates are just wide enough to get a standard vehicle through. Vehicles start in a stagger, proceeding one by one, and are deemed to have cleared a gate if at least one of the front wheel hubs passes between the canes. The vehicle's attempt ends when it comes to a stop (depending on the exact level of skill the trial is aimed at any stopping may end the attempt, or a few seconds may be allowed). Long-wheelbase vehicles are usually allowed to perform a three-point turn if needed, providing the driver declares where the turn is going to be made before they attempt the course (this puts a strong emphasis on ground-reading ability). This can also be called a "shunt", where the driver has to attempt a gate and then shout "shunt". They are then allowed a space of one and a half car lengths to reverse and line the car better to enter through the gate

The course between the gates is a "section": between the start line and the first gate is "Section 1", the part between the first and second gates is "Section 2" and so on. An RTV course is often laid out so that each section is progressively more difficult, although this is not always the case. If a driver fails to complete Section 1 they are given 10 points. If the attempt ends in Section 2, 9 points are awarded, etc. A clear round results in gaining only 1 point. A day's event will consist of many different courses and the driver with the lowest score is the winner.

Since the terrain covered in RTV trials should be well within the capabilities of any reasonably capable vehicle (even in standard form), these trials emphasize driver skill and ground-reading abilities. Skill and experience have a larger bearing on success than having a well-equipped and modified car.

==== CCV trialing ====
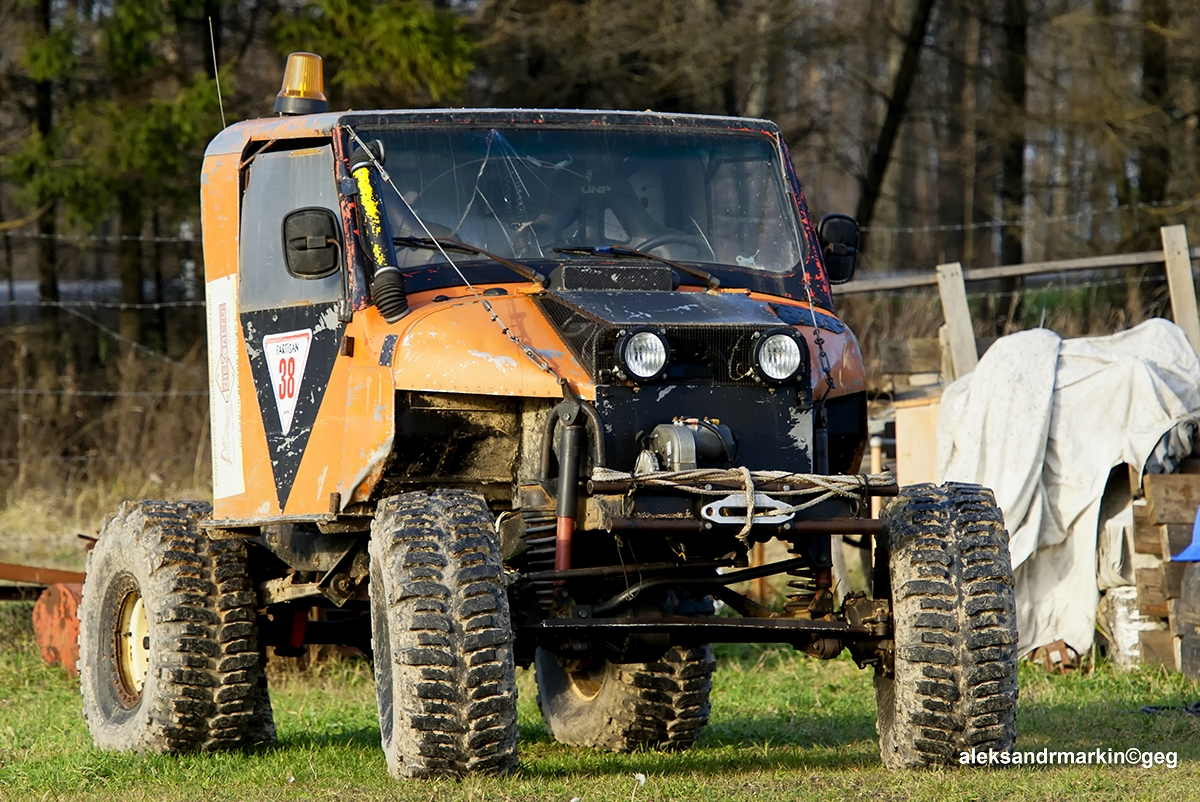
Non-legal Cross-Country Vehicle

Cross Country Vehicle (CCV) trialing is the next step up from RTV trialing and is open to non-road-legal vehicles, which greatly increases the scope for modification. The terrain covered will be of greater difficulty than that found on an RTV trial. Since there is a risk of touching rocks and trees with the bodywork, CCV trialing will usually require more careful use of speed to get the vehicle across certain obstacles will attempting to mitigate the risk of vehicle damage. Whilst no trial is intended to be vehicle-damaging, mistakes and accidents are inevitable. A standard-specification vehicle would not be expected to be able to complete a CCV course, but it would still be possible.

The event is run along the same lines as RTV, with a course made up of cane-marked gates.

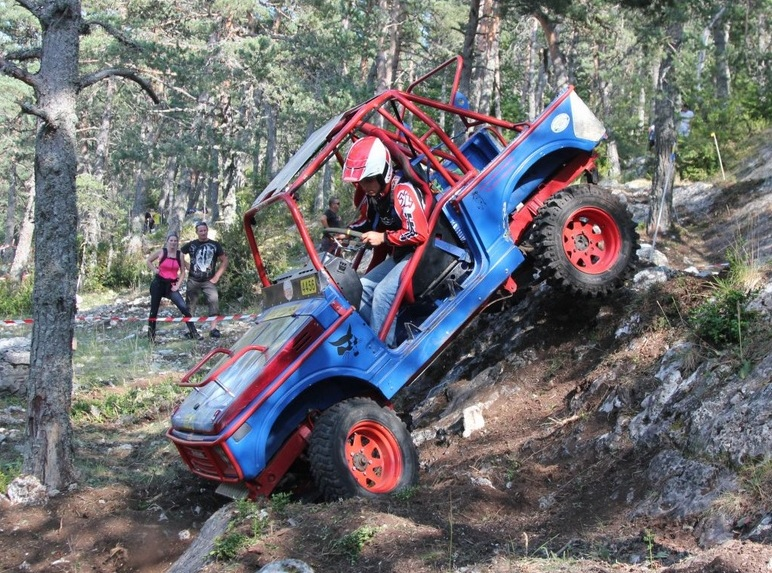
Suzuki SJ based trial car, showing an external roll-cage

CCV trialing differs greatly from RTV trials in the vehicles used. Since CCV judges adopt an "anything goes" attitude, CCV trials rely on having the correct vehicle to a much greater extent than in an RTV trial. Competitors can design and build vehicles that are much more optimized for off-road use, than in the lower ranks of trialing. CCV vehicles have powerful engines, high ground clearance, light, minimalist bodywork, and good approach and departure angles. For many years, in the UK, the ultimate CCV vehicle could be built by taking the chassis of a Range Rover, removing the body, cutting the chassis down to an 80-inch wheelbase, and attaching it to the body of a Series I Land Rover, retaining the Range Rover's V8 engine and coil-spring suspension in a light, maneuverable body. In recent years, the value of early Land Rovers and Range Rovers has risen to the extent that this is no longer practical. CCV trailers now usually base their vehicles around Land Rover Defenders or a standard 100-inch chassis from a Range Rover or Series I Discovery. The Suzuki SJ series of vehicles also make good bases for CCV-spec vehicles. Some vehicles are specially built, taking the form of light "buggies" with tractor tires and "fiddle" brakes (fiddle brakes give the ability to lock a wheel, which enables much better turning, better control descending hills, traction control by slowing or locking the spinning wheel) for the best performance.

Vehicles are required to meet certain safety regulations. Roll-cages must be fitted and be built to a suitable standard, recovery points must be fitted front and rear and fuel tanks must meet certain standards. A 4-point harness for all occupants is required and a fire extinguisher is recommended.

== Off-roading events ==
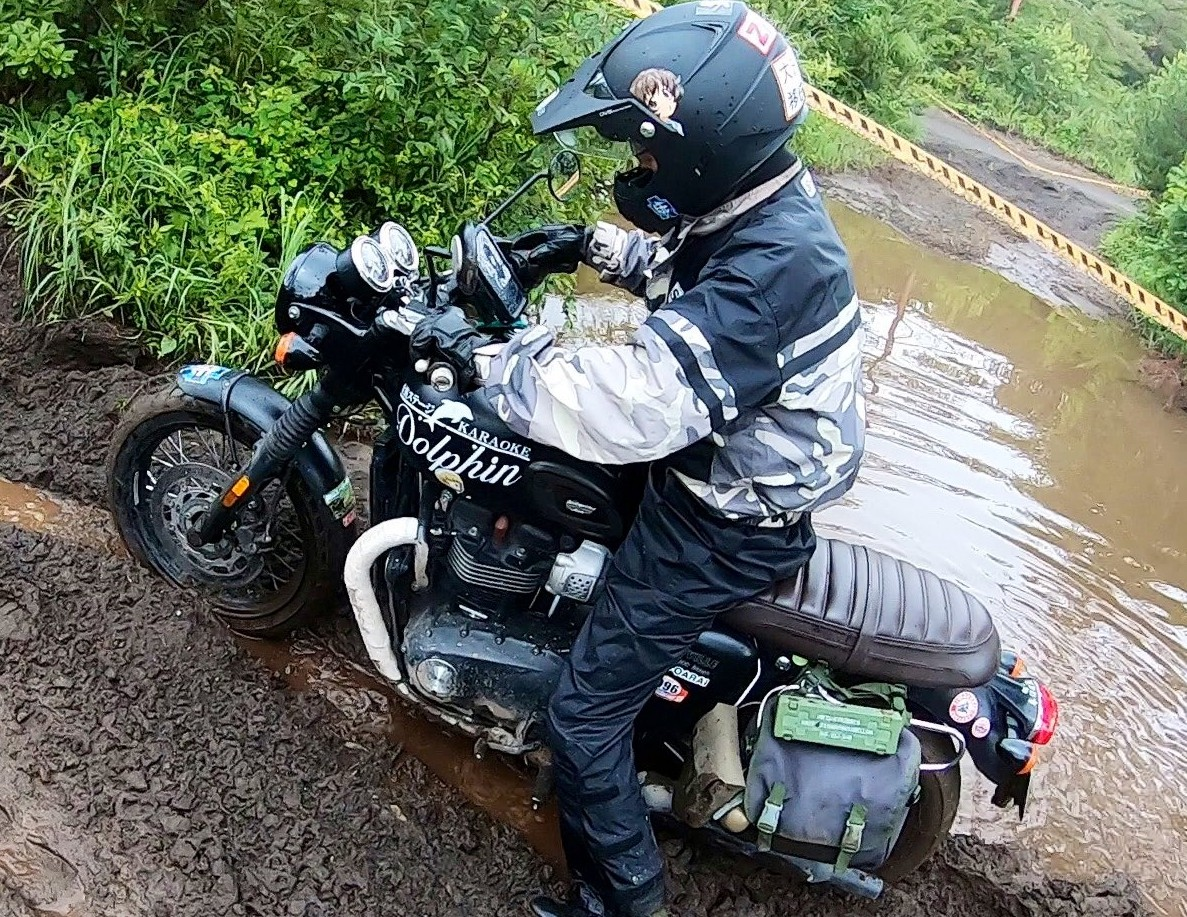
Driving a Triumph Bonneville during an offroad event

In some countries off-road activities are strictly regulated, while others promote cross-country off-road endurance events like the Dakar Rally, Spanish Baja, Africa Eco Race, Abu Dhabi Desert Challenge, Russian Baja Northern Forest, King of the Hammers, San Felipe 250 and Baja 500 & 1000, which are a test of navigation skills and machine durability. Off-road parks and motocross tracks also host several events and may be the only legal place to off-road in the area.

== Criticism of ORV use ==
=== Environmental impact ===
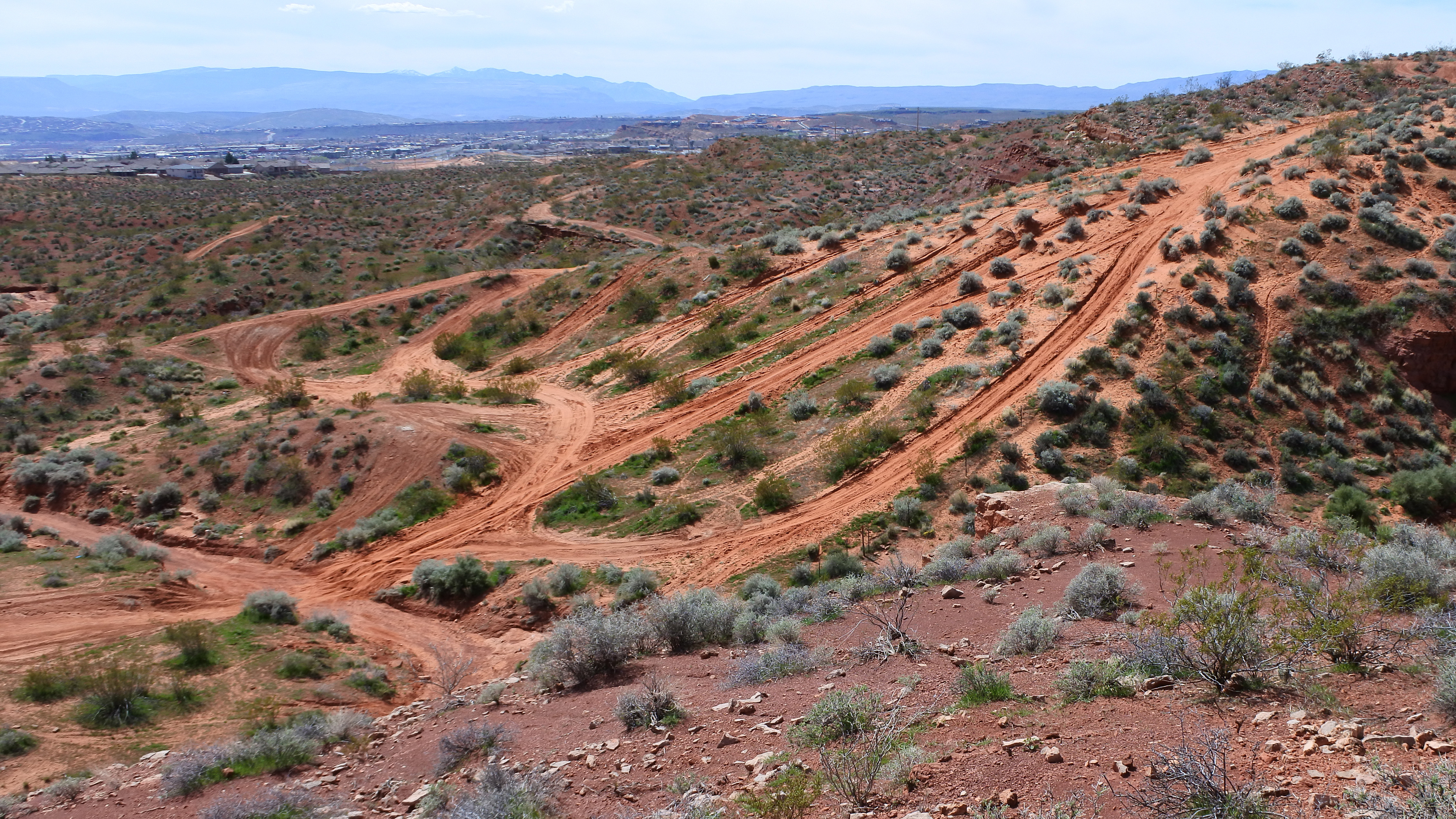
Off-road vehicle impact in SW Utah

Off-road vehicle use on public land has been criticized by some members of the U.S. government and environmental organizations including the Sierra Club and The Wilderness Society. They have noted several consequences of illegal ORV use such as pollution, trail damage, erosion, land degradation, possible species extinction, and habitat destruction which can leave hiking trails impassable. ORV proponents argue that legal use taking place under planned access along with the multiple environment and trail conservation efforts by ORV groups will mitigate these issues. Groups such as the BlueRibbon Coalition advocate for the responsible use of public lands for off-road activities.

Noise pollution is also a concern and several studies conducted by Montana State University, California State University, University of Florida and others have cited possible negative behavioral changes in wildlife as the result of some ORV use.

Some U.S. states have laws to reduce noise generated by off-road and non-highway vehicles. Washington is one example: "State law requires off-road and other non-highway vehicles to use specified noise-muffling devices (RCW 46.09.120(1) (e) maximum limits and test procedures). State agencies and local governments may adopt regulations governing the operation of non-highway vehicles on property, streets, or highways within their jurisdiction, provided they are not less stringent than state law (RCW 46.09.180 regulation by local political subdivisions)".

=== Mojave desert controversy ===
The U.S. Bureau of Land Management (BLM) supervises several large off-road vehicle areas in California's Mojave Desert.

In 2009, U.S. District Judge Susan Illston ruled against the BLM's proposed designation of additional off-road use on designated open routes on public land. According to the ruling, the BLM violated its regulations when it designated approximately 5,000 miles (8,000 km) of off-road vehicle routes in 2006. According to Judge Illston the BLM's designation was "flawed because it does not contain a reasonable range of alternatives" to limit damage to sensitive habitat, as required under the National Environmental Policy Act. Illston found that the Bureau had inadequately analyzed the route's impact on air quality, soils, plant communities and sensitive species, such as the endangered Mojave fringe-toed lizard, pointing out that the United States Congress has declared that the California Desert and its resources are "extremely fragile, easily scarred, and slowly healed".

The court also found that the BLM failed to follow route restrictions established in the agency's conservation plan, resulting in the establishment of hundreds of illegal OHV routes during the previous three decades. The plan violated the BLM's regulations, specifically the Federal Land Policy and Management Act of 1976 (FLPMA) and the National Environmental Policy Act of 1969 (NEPA). The ruling was considered a success for a coalition of conservation groups including the Friends of Juniper Flats, Community Off-road Vehicle Watch, California Native Plant Society, The Center for Biological Diversity, The Sierra Club, and The Wilderness Society who initiated the legal challenge in late 2006.

=== Roadless area conservation ===
Many U.S. national parks have discussed or enacted roadless rules and partial or total bans on ORVs. To accommodate enthusiasts, some parks like Big Cypress National Preserve in Florida, were created specifically for ORVs and related purposes. However, such designations have not prevented damage or abuse of the policy.

=== Public statements ===
In 2004, several environmental organizations sent a letter to Dale Bosworth, Chief of the United States Forest Service, and described the extent of damage caused by ORV use, including health threats to other people:

It is well-established that the proliferation of off-road vehicles and snowmobile use places soil, vegetation, air and water quality, and wildlife at risk through pollution, erosion, sedimentation of streams, habitat fragmentation and disturbance, and other adverse impacts to resources. These impacts cause severe and lasting damage to the natural environment on which human-powered and equestrian recreation depends and alter the remote and wild character of the backcountry. Motorized recreation monopolizes forest areas by denying other users the quiet, pristine, backcountry experience they seek. It also presents safety and health threats to other re-creationists.

In 2004 the Supreme Court Justice Antonin Scalia listed several problems that result from ORV use in natural areas. From the Environmental News Service article:

Scalia noted that off-road vehicle use on federal land has "negative environmental consequences including soil disruption and compaction, harassment of animals, and annoyance of wilderness lovers.

Several environmental organizations, including the Rangers for Responsible Recreation, are campaigning to draw attention to a growing threat posed by off-road vehicle misuse and to assist overmatched land managers in addressing ORV use impacts. These campaigns in part have prompted congressional hearings about the growing impact of unmanaged off-road vehicle use.

The House Natural Resources Committee Subcommittee on National Parks, Forests and Public Lands held an oversight hearing on "The Impacts of Unmanaged Off-Road Vehicles on Federal Land" on March 13, 2008. A second hearing on off-highway vehicle (OHV) management on public lands was held by the Senate Energy and Natural Resources Committee on June 5, 2008. The Senate committee hearing was convened to find out why the agencies are failing to grapple with the negative impacts of off-road vehicle use on US public lands and what the agencies might need to start doing differently. For the first time in perhaps a decade, members of the Senate Energy and Natural Resources Committee grilled leaders of the Forest Service and the BLM about why off-road vehicle use is being allowed to damage America's national treasures.

Taking center stage in the discussion was the "travel planning process", a complex analysis and decision-making procedure to designate appropriate roads and trails. Both the Forest Service and BLM have been engaged in somewhat similar travel planning processes now for years, but some of the committee members didn't seem to think those processes were going along so well. "The BLM has identified travel management on its lands as ‘one of the greatest management challenges’ it faces," stated committee Chairman Jeff Bingaman, D-NM. "Likewise, the Forest Service has identified unmanaged recreation — including ORV use — as one of the top four threats to the management and health of the National Forest System. Despite these statements, it seems to me that neither agency has been able to successfully manage off-road use."

"Existing rules for managing off-road vehicles are not being enforced," Bingaman added, and the agencies are ignoring unregulated use "with significant consequences for the health of our public lands and communities, and adverse effects on other authorized public land uses."

Off-Road Vehicle Damage

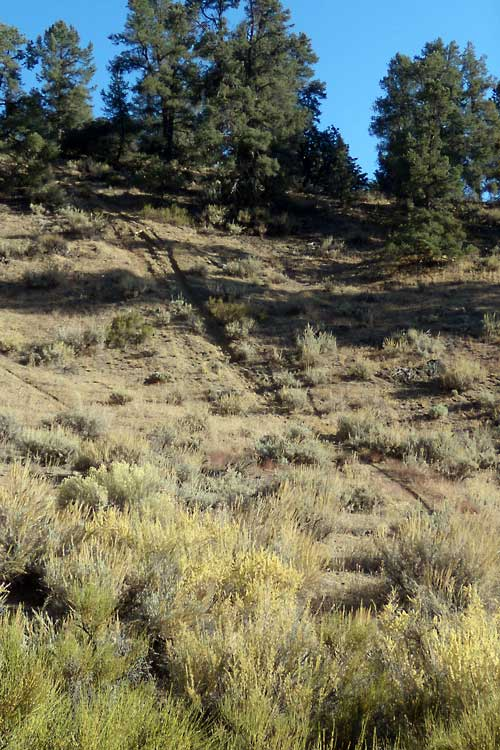
Negative environmental effects caused by a motorcycle to a portion of the Los Padres National Forest

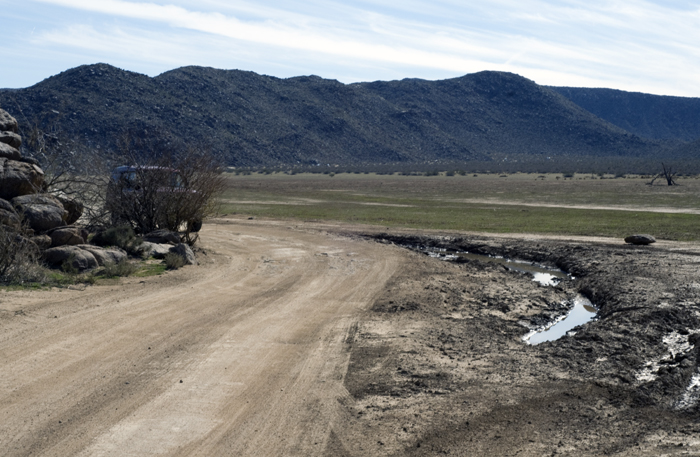
Damage that occurred when vehicles left the posted trail in Anza-Borrego Desert State Park

== In gaming ==
Video games that allow users to off-road include Forza Horizon, Dirt Series, MudRunner, Grand Theft Auto V, Dakar Desert Rally, and the MotorStorm series.

== See also ==
- All-terrain vehicle
- Amphibious vehicle
- Approach and departure angles
- Baja Bug
- Breakover angle
- Dirt Bike
- Dual-sport motorcycle
- Game viewer vehicle
- Mountain bike
- Mud bogging
- Overlanding
- Ramp travel index
- Jeep trail
- Ride height
- Side-by-side
- Trophy truck
