= 2019 Middle East Rally Championship =

The 2019 Middle East Rally Championship was an international rally championship sanctioned by the FIA. The championship was to be contested over five events held in five Middle East countries from March to November. One event, the Cyprus Rally, is shared with the 2019 European Rally Championship. The season-ending Kuwait International Rally was cancelled.

Qatar's Nasser Al-Attiyah won his fifteenth MERC championship and his ninth consecutively. Al-Attiyah won all four rallies contested. Fellow Qatari driver Abdulaziz Al-Kuwari was second in the championship but scored less than half the points Al-Attiyah scored. Al-Kuwari was second in Qatar and Jordan but would score only four points for the rest of the season. Kuwaiti driver Meshari Al-Thefiri was again third in the championship.

== Event calendar and results ==
The 2019 MERC was as follows:

Round	Rally name	Podium finishers				Statistics			
Round	Rally name	Rank	Driver	Car	Time	Stages	Length	Starters	Finishers
1	Manateq Qatar International Rally (14–16 March)	1	(Qatar) Nasser Al-Attiyah	Volkswagen Polo GTI R5	1:56:18.8	11	203.72 km	22	14
1	Manateq Qatar International Rally (14–16 March)	2	(Qatar) Abdulaziz Al-Kuwari	Škoda Fabia R5	1:59:48.4	11	203.72 km	22	14
1	Manateq Qatar International Rally (14–16 March)	3	(Qatar) Hamed Al-Thani	Ford Fiesta R5	2:07:22.4	11	203.72 km	22	14
2	Jordan Rally (25–27 April)	1	(Qatar) Nasser Al-Attiyah	Volkswagen Polo GTI R5	3:00:48.5	21	244.09 km	22	11
2	Jordan Rally (25–27 April)	2	(Qatar) Abdulaziz Al-Kuwari	Škoda Fabia R5	3:04:56.7	21	244.09 km	22	11
2	Jordan Rally (25–27 April)	3	(Jordan) Marouf Abu Samra	Ford Fiesta R5	3:08:27.6	21	244.09 km	22	11
3	Rally of Lebanon (30 August–1 September)	1	(Qatar) Nasser Al-Attiyah	Volkswagen Polo GTI R5	2:06:19.3	11	215.94 km	24	15
3	Rally of Lebanon (30 August–1 September)	2	(Lebanon) Rodrigue Rahi	Mitsubishi Lancer Evolution IX	2:13:28.6	11	215.94 km	24	15
3	Rally of Lebanon (30 August–1 September)	3	(Lebanon) Patrick Njeim	Mitsubishi Lancer Evolution IX	2:14:55.6	11	215.94 km	24	15
4	Cyprus Rally (27–29 September)	1	(Qatar) Nasser Al-Attiyah	Volkswagen Polo GTI R5	3:02:51.3	12	199.76 km	53	34
4	Cyprus Rally (27–29 September)	2	(United Kingdom) Chris Ingram	Škoda Fabia R5	3:06:42.2	12	199.76 km	53	34
4	Cyprus Rally (27–29 September)	3	(Finland) Mikko Hirvonen	Ford Fiesta R5	3:07:25.3	12	199.76 km	53	34
5	Kuwait International Rally (31 October–2 November)	Cancelled							

== Championship standings ==
The 2019 MERC for Drivers points was as follows:

Pos.	Driver	Vehicle	(Qatar) QAT	(Jordan) JOR	(Lebanon) LBN	(Cyprus) CYP	Total
1	(Qatar) Nasser Al-Attiyah	Volkswagen Polo GTI R5	1	1	1	1	155
2	(Qatar) Abdulaziz Al-Kuwari	Škoda Fabia R5	2	2		8	65
3	(Kuwait) Meshari Al-Thefiri	Mitsubishi Lancer Evolution X	6	4	6		44
4	(Lebanon) Rodrigue Rahi	Mitsubishi Lancer Evolution IX			2		30
5	(United Kingdom) Chris Ingram	Škoda Fabia R5				2	27
6	(Jordan) Marouf Abu Samra	Ford Fiesta R5		3			25
6	(Lebanon) Patrick Njeim	Mitsubishi Lancer Evolution IX			3		25
8	(Qatar) Hamed Al-Thani	Ford Fiesta R5	3				24
9	(Finland) Mikko Hirvonen	Ford Fiesta R5				3	21
10	(Lebanon) Henry Massaad	Citroën DS3 R3T			4		20
11	(Qatar) Nasser Khalifa Al-Attiyah	Ford Fiesta R5	4	Ret	Ret		19
12	(Poland) Łukasz Habaj	Škoda Fabia R5				4	18
13	(Qatar) Khalid Mohammad Al-Suwaidi	Ford Fiesta R5	5				16
13	(Austria) Niki Mayr-Melnhof	Ford Fiesta R2				5	16
15	(Lebanon) Tarek Younis	Mitsubishi Lancer Evolution IX			5		15
16	(Lebanon) Henry Kahy	Škoda Fabia R2	12	6	10		13
17	(Jordan) Khaled Juma	Mitsubishi Lancer Evolution X		6			12
18	(Germany) Albert von Thurn und Taxis	Škoda Fabia R2 evo				6	11
19	(Jordan) Shadi Shabaan	Mitsubishi Lancer Evolution IX		7			8
20	(Italy) Stefano Marrini	Mitsubishi Lancer Evolution IX	7				7
20	(Lebanon) Albert Hayek	Renault Clio R3			7		7
20	(Chile) Emilio Fernández	Škoda Fabia R2 evo				7	7
23	(Qatar) Rashid Al-Mohannadi	Mitsubishi Lancer Evolution X	8				4
23	(Lebanon) Ahmad Khaled	Mitsubishi Lancer Evolution VIII	Ret	11	Ret		4
23	(Lebanon) Nassib Nassar	Mitsubishi Lancer Evolution X			8		4
26	(Qatar) Abdullah Al-Kuwari	Subaru WRX STI	9				3
26	(Saudi Arabia) Saeed Al-Mouri	Mitsubishi Lancer Evolution X		Ret	Ret		3
26	(Lebanon) Raafat Al-Mohtar	Mitsubishi Lancer Evolution IX			12		3
29	(Oman) Zakariya Ahmed Al-Aufi	Mitsubishi Lancer Evolution IX		Ret			2
29	(Lebanon) Alex Feghali	Mitsubishi Lancer Evolution VIII; Peugeot 208 R2		Ret	11		2
29	(Hungary) Norbert Herczig	Volkswagen Polo GTI R5				9	2
32	(Oman) Abdullah Al-Rawahi	Subaru Impreza STi N14; Mitsubishi Lancer Evolution IX	11	Ret	Ret		1
32	(Brazil) Paulo Nobre	Škoda Fabia R5				10	1

Key
Colour	Result
Gold	Winner
Silver	2nd place
Bronze	3rd place
Green	Points finish
Blue	Non-points finish
Blue	Non-classified finish (NC)
Purple	Did not finish (Ret)
Black	Excluded (EX)
Black	Disqualified (DSQ)
White	Did not start (DNS)
White	Cancelled (C)
Blank	Withdrew entry from the event (WD)
