= Dimi Mavropoulos =

Cypriot rally driver and businessman (1949–2026)

Dimis Mavropoulos
- Ντίμης Μαυρόπουλος
- Born: 31 October 1949; Limassol, British Cyprus
- Died: 29 August 2026 (aged 76); Cape Greco, Cyprus
- Occupations: Rally driver, businessman, automobile collector
- Years active: 1969–2000s
- Known for: Cypriot rallying; Cyprus Historic & Classic Motor Museum
- Children: 4

Dimis Mavropoulos (Greek: Ντίμης Μαυρόπουλος; 31 October 1949 – 29 August 2026) was a Cypriot Greek rally driver, businessman and automobile collector. He was one of the most prominent figures in the history of Cypriot rallying, competing for more than four decades and achieving numerous victories and championship placings in Cyprus and abroad.

Mavropoulos won the Cyprus Rally Championship in 1986 and 1988 and was the winner of the 1990 Cyprus Rally, then known as the Rothmans International Cyprus Rally. In 1986, he finished second overall in the international event behind Belgian driver Patrick Snijers.

After retiring from competitive rallying, Mavropoulos devoted much of his time to historic and classic automobiles. He founded the Cyprus Historic & Classic Motor Museum in Limassol.

== Early life ==
Mavropoulos was born in Limassol, Cyprus, on 31 October 1949. His interest in automobiles began during childhood. According to accounts of his life, he learned to drive his father's tractor at a young age and, at the age of nine, took his mother's car without permission, resulting in a police pursuit that lasted approximately four hours before the vehicle ran out of fuel.

As a teenager, Mavropoulos began participating in motorsport despite being below the legal age for competition. He used another identity to enter events, and the name "Dimi", which subsequently became his best-known motorsport name, originated during this period.

Following his military service, Mavropoulos moved to London in 1969, where he became involved in his family's agricultural-export business. He purchased a Ford Escort and began competing in rallies in Great Britain and Europe, while continuing to participate in events in Cyprus.

== Rally career ==
Mavropoulos began his serious rally career in 1969, when he was approximately 20 years old. He subsequently competed for and drove vehicles associated with several manufacturers and teams, including Ford, Mitsubishi, Talbot, and Audi.

Among the cars associated with his career were the Ford Escort, Talbot Sunbeam Lotus, Audi Quattro, Audi 90 Quattro, Ford Sierra Cosworth, Ford Escort RS Cosworth and Mitsubishi rally cars.

=== 1981 Cyprus Rally ===
Mavropoulos competed in the 1981 Rothmans Cyprus Rally in a Talbot Sunbeam Lotus, co-driven by Dave Adams. He finished second behind Vahan Terzian.

=== 1985 ===
In the 1985 Rothmans Cyprus Rally, Mavropoulos and Dave Adams finished fifth overall in an Audi Quattro A2.

=== 1986 ===
The 1986 season was one of the most significant of Mavropoulos's career. He won the Cyprus Rally Championship for the first time. In the same year, he finished second overall in the Rothmans International Cyprus Rally behind Patrick Snijers.

=== 1987–1988 ===
During the late 1980s, Mavropoulos continued to compete in both domestic and international events. Changes to international rally regulations led him to drive a factory-supported Ford Sierra for Ford UK Motorsport in the Rothmans International Cyprus Rally, while continuing to compete in an Audi in the Cyprus Championship.

Mavropoulos won the Cyprus Rally Championship again in 1988.

=== 1990 Cyprus Rally ===
In 1990, Mavropoulos won the Rothmans International Cyprus Rally in an Audi Coupé Quattro, alongside co-driver Nicos Antoniades.

According to the Cyprus Historic & Classic Motor Museum, Mavropoulos also won all seven events of the Cyprus championship in 1990.

=== 1991–1995 ===
In the 1991 Rothmans Cyprus Rally, Mavropoulos and Nicos Antoniades finished second overall in an Audi 90 Quattro.

In the 1992 Rothmans Cyprus Rally, Mavropoulos and Antoniades finished second overall in a Ford Sierra Cosworth 4×4.

In 1994, Mavropoulos entered the Cyprus Rally Championship in a factory-prepared Ford Escort Cosworth 4×4. Ford's competition department in the United Kingdom assisted with gravel testing and development. He finished third overall in the Rothmans Cyprus Rally that year.

In 1995, he began development of an Audi S2 Quattro for Group A competition. The project was discontinued following Audi's withdrawal from rallying.

== Legacy ==
Mavropoulos accumulated more than four decades of involvement in rallying. He was credited with the best finishing record by a Cypriot driver in the Rothmans International Cyprus Rally and with an exceptional record of overall championship placings in the Cyprus Championship.

== Business career ==
Alongside motorsport, Mavropoulos was involved in business, including the family's agricultural-export activities and later commercial ventures.

== Cyprus Historic & Classic Motor Museum ==
After his competitive driving career, Mavropoulos increasingly devoted himself to collecting historic and classic vehicles. His vision for an automotive museum began around 2000, and the Cyprus Historic & Classic Motor Museum was subsequently established in Limassol.

== Personal life and death ==
Mavropoulos was the father of four daughters. He died on 29 August 2026, at the age of 76, following an accident at Cape Greco, Cyprus. His boat was affected by severe sea conditions and ran aground on rocks. Mavropoulos entered the water during the incident and was subsequently found unconscious. He was transported for medical treatment but was pronounced dead. His partner and daughter were rescued.

His death was widely reported in Cyprus, with tributes describing him as a major figure in Cypriot motorsport and a prominent Limassol personality.

== See also ==
- Cyprus Rally
- Rallying
