= 2018 Middle East Rally Championship =

International rally championship sanctioned by the FIA

The 2018 Middle East Rally Championship was an international rally championship sanctioned by the FIA. The championship was contested over five events held in five Middle East countries from April to November. One event, the Cyprus Rally, is shared with the 2018 European Rally Championship.

Qatar's Nasser Al-Attiyah won his fourteenth MERC championship and his eighth consecutively. Al-Attiyah won the season opening Jordan Rally and later the Kuwait International Rally which was returning to the schedule after being left of the 2017 calendar. Al-Attiyah was also the leading MERC competitor to finish at the Cyprus Rally. Czech driver Vojtěch Štajf won the last event of the year in Qatar, held just two weeks after Kuwait. He was also second in Jordan and the second placed MERC driver in Cyprus. He was runner up in the championship. Kuwaiti driver Meshari Al-Thefiri was third in the championship finishing second in Kuwait and third in Jordan. Lebanese veteran Roger Feghali's one-off appearance at his home event saw him win the rally for the fourteenth time.

== Event calendar and results ==
The 2018 MERC was as follows:

Round	Rally name	Podium finishers				Statistics			
Round	Rally name	Rank	Driver	Car	Time	Stages	Length	Starters	Finishers
1	Jordan Rally (26–28 April)	1	(Qatar) Nasser Al-Attiyah	Ford Fiesta R5	1:56:30.3	14	167.80 km	13	12
1	Jordan Rally (26–28 April)	2	(Czech Republic) Vojtěch Štajf	Škoda Fabia R5	2:04:33.5	14	167.80 km	13	12
1	Jordan Rally (26–28 April)	3	(Kuwait) Meshari Al-Thefiri	Mitsubishi Lancer Evolution X	2:06:50.3	14	167.80 km	13	12
2	Cyprus Rally (15–17 June)	1	(Cyprus) Simos Galatariotis	Škoda Fabia R5	1:55:40.2	13	180.91 km	59	46
2	Cyprus Rally (15–17 June)	2	(Portugal) Bruno Magalhães	Škoda Fabia R5	1:55:40.8	13	180.91 km	59	46
2	Cyprus Rally (15–17 June)	3	(Hungary) Norbert Herczig	Škoda Fabia R5	1:57:01.6	13	180.91 km	59	46
3	Rally of Lebanon (6–8 July)	1	(Lebanon) Roger Feghali	Škoda Fabia R5	2:07:43.0	11	222.86 km	27	20
3	Rally of Lebanon (6–8 July)	2	(Qatar) Nasser Al-Attiyah	Ford Fiesta R5	2:09:07.4	11	222.86 km	27	20
3	Rally of Lebanon (6–8 July)	3	(Lebanon) Rodolphe Asmar	Škoda Fabia R5	2:14:06.3	11	222.86 km	27	20
4	Kuwait International Rally (1–3 November)	1	(Qatar) Nasser Al-Attiyah	Ford Fiesta R5	1:58:24.6	13	198.52 km	13	10
4	Kuwait International Rally (1–3 November)	2	(Kuwait) Meshari Al-Thefiri	Mitsubishi Lancer Evolution X	2:10:43.8	13	198.52 km	13	10
4	Kuwait International Rally (1–3 November)	3	(Kuwait) Jasem Al-Maqahwi	Mitsubishi Lancer Evolution VIII	2:26:27.7	13	198.52 km	13	10
5	International Rally of Qatar (15–17 November)	1	(Czech Republic) Vojtěch Štajf	Škoda Fabia R5	1:39:46.7	10	153.82 km	16	6
5	International Rally of Qatar (15–17 November)	2	(Qatar) Adel Hussein	Ford Fiesta R5	1:43:54.5	10	153.82 km	16	6
5	International Rally of Qatar (15–17 November)	3	(Qatar) Abdullah Al-Kuwari	Mitsubishi Lancer Evolution X	1:52:48.0	10	153.82 km	16	6

== Championship standings ==
The 2018 MERC for Drivers points was as follows:

Pos.	Driver	Vehicle	(Jordan) JOR	(Cyprus) CYP	(Lebanon) LBN	(Kuwait) KUW	(Qatar) QAT	Total
1	(Qatar) Nasser Al-Attiyah	Ford Fiesta R5	1	1	2	1	Ret	153
2	(Czech Republic) Vojtěch Štajf	Škoda Fabia R5	2	2	5	4	1	131
3	(Kuwait) Meshari Al-Thefiri	Mitsubishi Lancer Evolution X	3		8	2	Ret	59
4	(Lebanon) Roger Feghali	Škoda Fabia R5			1			38
5	(Jordan) Khaled Juma	Mitsubishi Lancer Evolution X	4			5		32
5	(Lebanon) Henry Kahy	Škoda Fabia R2	7	17	9	7	6	32
7	(Qatar) Adel Hussein	Ford Fiesta R5					2	29
8	(Cyprus) Christos Demosthenous	Mitsubishi Lancer Evolution X		3				25
9	(Qatar) Abdullah Al-Kuwari	Mitsubishi Lancer Evolution X					3	24
9	(Lebanon) Rodolphe Asmar	Škoda Fabia R5			3			24
11	(Qatar) Nasser Khalifa Al-Attiyah	Mitsubishi Lancer Evolution X				3		19
11	(Cyprus) Alexandros Tsouloftas	Citroën DS3 R5		4				19
11	(Lebanon) Eddy Abou-Karam	Hyundai i20 R5			4			19
14	(Qatar) Mohamed Al-Meer	Mitsubishi Lancer Evolution X					4	17
14	(Jordan) Ihab Al-Shorafa	Mitsubishi Lancer Evolution IX	6			8		17
16	(Jordan) Ahmad Shabaan	Mitsubishi Lancer Evolution IX	5					16
17	(Cyprus) Savvas Savva	Mitsubishi Lancer Evolution IX		5				15
18	(Qatar) Rashid Al-Mohannadi	Mitsubishi Lancer Evolution IX					5	14
19	(Cyprus) Costas Zenonos	Mitsubishi Lancer Evolution IX		6				12
20	(Oman) Abdullah Al-Rawahi	Subaru Impreza STi N14	Ret	15		6	Ret	11
20	(Lebanon) Rony Kanaan	Citroën DS3 R3T			6			11
22	(Cyprus) Panayiotis Yiangou	Hyundai i20 R5		7				8
23	(Lebanon) Matthias Njeim	Peugeot 208 R2			7			7
24	(Cyprus) George Englezou	Mitsubishi Lancer Evolution IX		8				5
24	(Cyprus) Panikos Polykarpou	Mitsubishi Lancer Evolution IX		9				5
26	(Jordan) Asem Aref	Renault Clio	8					4
27	(Kuwait) Salah Bin Eidan	Mitsubishi Lancer Evolution IX					Ret	3
27	(Lebanon) Michel Slaiby	Ford Fiesta R5			Ret			3
29	(Cyprus) Costas Laos	Mitsubishi Lancer Evolution IX		11				1
29	(Cyprus) Kyriakos Kyriakou	Subaru Impreza STi R4		12				1

Key
Colour	Result
Gold	Winner
Silver	2nd place
Bronze	3rd place
Green	Points finish
Blue	Non-points finish
Blue	Non-classified finish (NC)
Purple	Did not finish (Ret)
Black	Excluded (EX)
Black	Disqualified (DSQ)
White	Did not start (DNS)
White	Cancelled (C)
Blank	Withdrew entry from the event (WD)
