= Ramp travel index =

Measure of a vehicle's suspension flexibility

RTI ramp

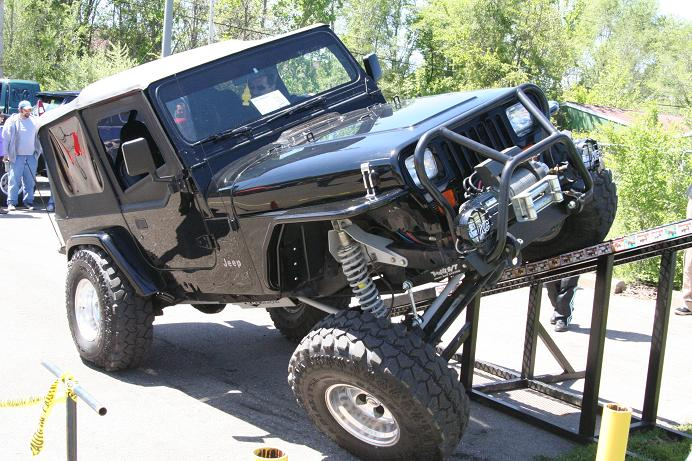
Modified Jeep ramping an RTI ramp

Ramp travel index (RTI) is a way of measuring a vehicle's ability to flex its suspension, a property also known as axle articulation. The RTI rating is used mainly in the off-roading industry to test and describe chassis limits of modified vehicles.

The ramps vary between 15 and 30 degrees of angle for the vehicle to ride up. "Ramping" a vehicle involves putting one front tire on the ramp and driving up slowly until one of the other three tires (usually the rear one on the same side as the tire driving the ramp) begins to leave the ground. The measurement is only taken when the other three tires are still on the ground. The distance traveled up the ramp is then measured and is divided by the vehicle's wheelbase and finally multiplied by 1000 to give a final RTI score. Most stock SUVs have RTI values from 400 to 550; vehicles modified for off-road competition have the ability to exceed 1000.

RTI is mainly of interest for rock crawling with vehicles which do not have modern differential/traction control systems.

== Significance of ramp travel index and axle articulation ==
A high RTI or good axle articulation is essential for good off road performance on severe routes if the vehicle has open diffs. A vehicle that has good axle articulation can keep all wheels in contact with the ground while traversing obstacles, which ensures that all wheels can deliver their torque to the surface with less risk of losing traction on any given wheel. All this can allow a very high level of off-road performance without the need for electronic chassis control systems that can be vulnerable and unreliable under extreme conditions.

Over a given obstacle, vehicles with simple AWD systems and chassis designs that restrict their RTI—i.e. that have poorer axle articulation—lift a wheel early which is then free to turn spinning away power unless differentials are able to be locked. A vehicle with high RTI with open diffs tends to make uninterrupted (safer) progress as all wheels remain in contact with the ground during the maneuver. One chassis concept that often allows comparatively high RTI is the live axle (solid axle). Independent suspensions tend to have reduced articulation while offering better on-road comfort, and are becoming increasingly popular in road-oriented SUVs. Independent suspension can have similar or better articulation, handling, durability and/or payload capacity as solid axle, but it requires significantly more money and engineering.

The wide availability of traction control and automatic diff locking means that RTI is not useful as a measurement of off road ability for modern vehicles, but is still used for bragging rights.

== Calculating RTI ==
=== With a ramp ===
The formula for calculating RTI using a ramp as pictured above is

$r=\frac{d}{b} \times 1000$

Where b is the wheelbase of the vehicle, d is the distance travelled along a (usually 20 degree) ramp before any wheels leave the ground and r is the calculated ramp travel index.

=== Without a ramp ===
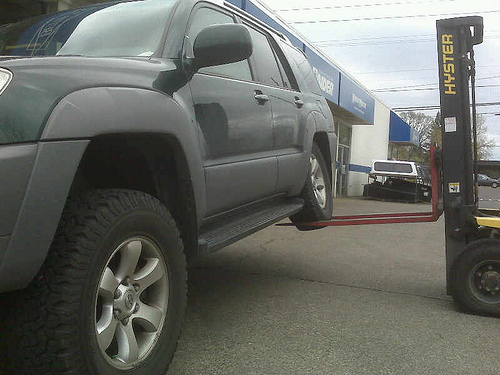
"Ramping" a 2003 4Runner without a ramp.

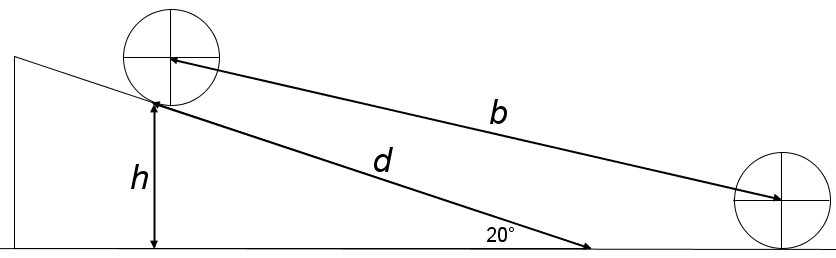
RTI calculation diagram.

It is possible to calculate RTI without a ramp using basic trigonometry, provided a safe method is available to lift one wheel, say, using a forklift. Using the diagram below, if h is the maximum distance from the bottom of the tire to the ground, then

$\sin 20^\circ=\frac{h}{d}$

Although d is not an available measurement, we can use the relationship between h and d to express d in terms of h:

$d=\frac{h}{\sin 20^\circ}$

Substituting this into the RTI formula produces:

$r=\frac{h}{b} \times \frac{1000}{\sin 20^\circ}$

This yields a convenient formula for calculating a 20° RTI value when no ramp is available. If b is the vehicle's wheelbase and h is the maximum distance from the ground to the bottom of the wheel without allowing any other wheel to leave the ground, then

$RTI_{20}=\frac{h}{b} \times 2924$

== See also ==
- Off-road vehicle
- Four-wheel drive
- Mini SUV
- Compact SUV
- Crossover SUV
- Luxury SUV
- Long travel suspension
- Suspension Travel
- Rock Crawling
- Overlanding
