= Spotter (maneuvering) =

Person who guides a vehicle driver

A spotter is a person used in vehicle maneuvers to assist a driver who may not have a clear view in their direction of travel. They are most commonly used in:

- Off-road rock crawling
- Reversing truck and trailer combinations, such as semitrailers, b-trains and road trains
- Placing oversized freight using a forklift
- Lifting loads using a vehicle-mounted crane (loads lifted using a fixed crane are supervised by a banksman)
- Guiding military vehicles (also called ground guiding)
- Dumping materials, such as from a dump truck
- Guiding oversized loads.

The spotter's advantage is the ability to move around the load or vehicle to determine the best trajectory.

A spotter will either use a set of standard hand signals, or will agree hand signals before the maneuver with the driver or operator.

Technological solutions such as reversing cameras and proximity sensors have reduced drivers' reliance on spotters in some circumstances.
