= Cyprus Rally =

Car rally event

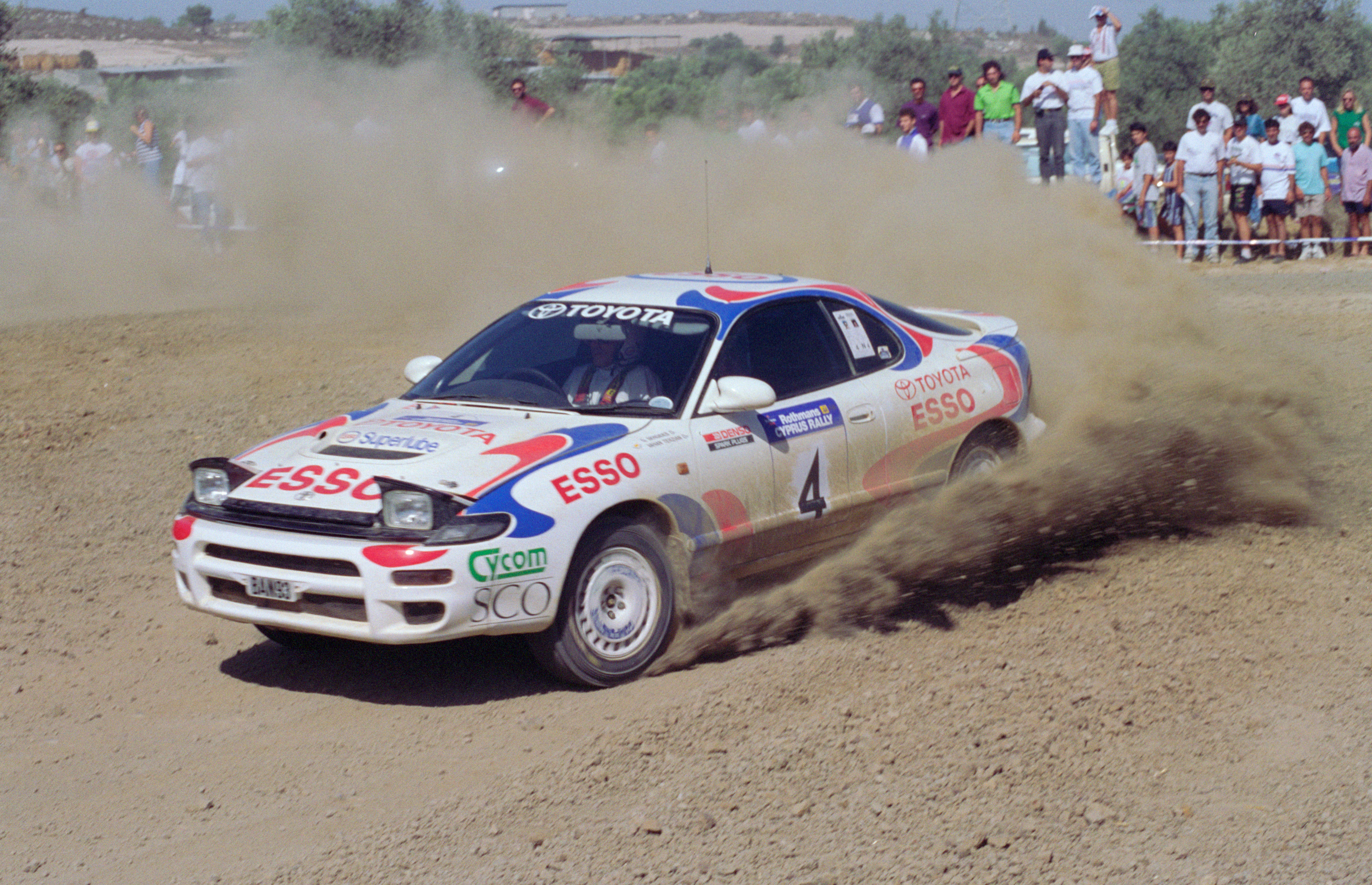
- Status: active
- Genre: motorsporting event
- Frequency: annual
- Country: Cyprus
- Inaugurated: 1970
- Website: cyprusrally.com.cy

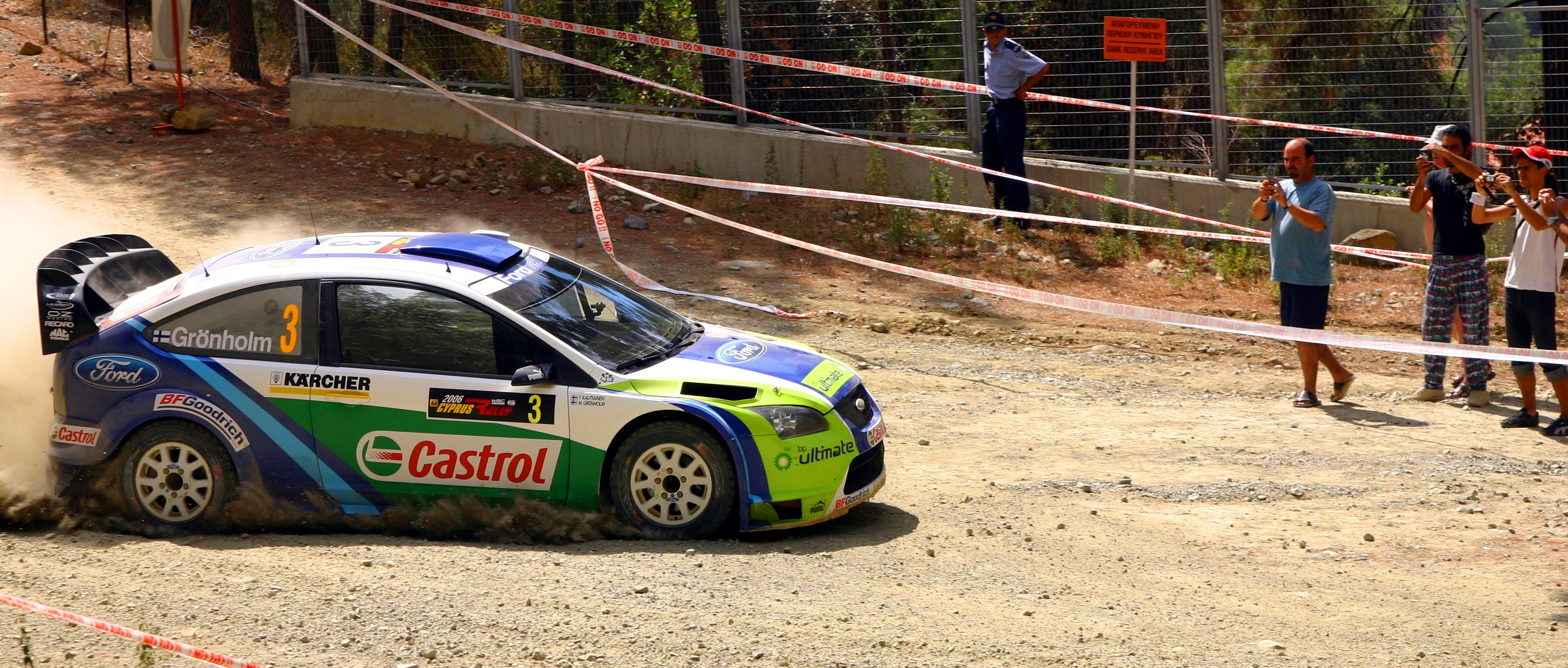
Marcus Grönholm at the 2006 event

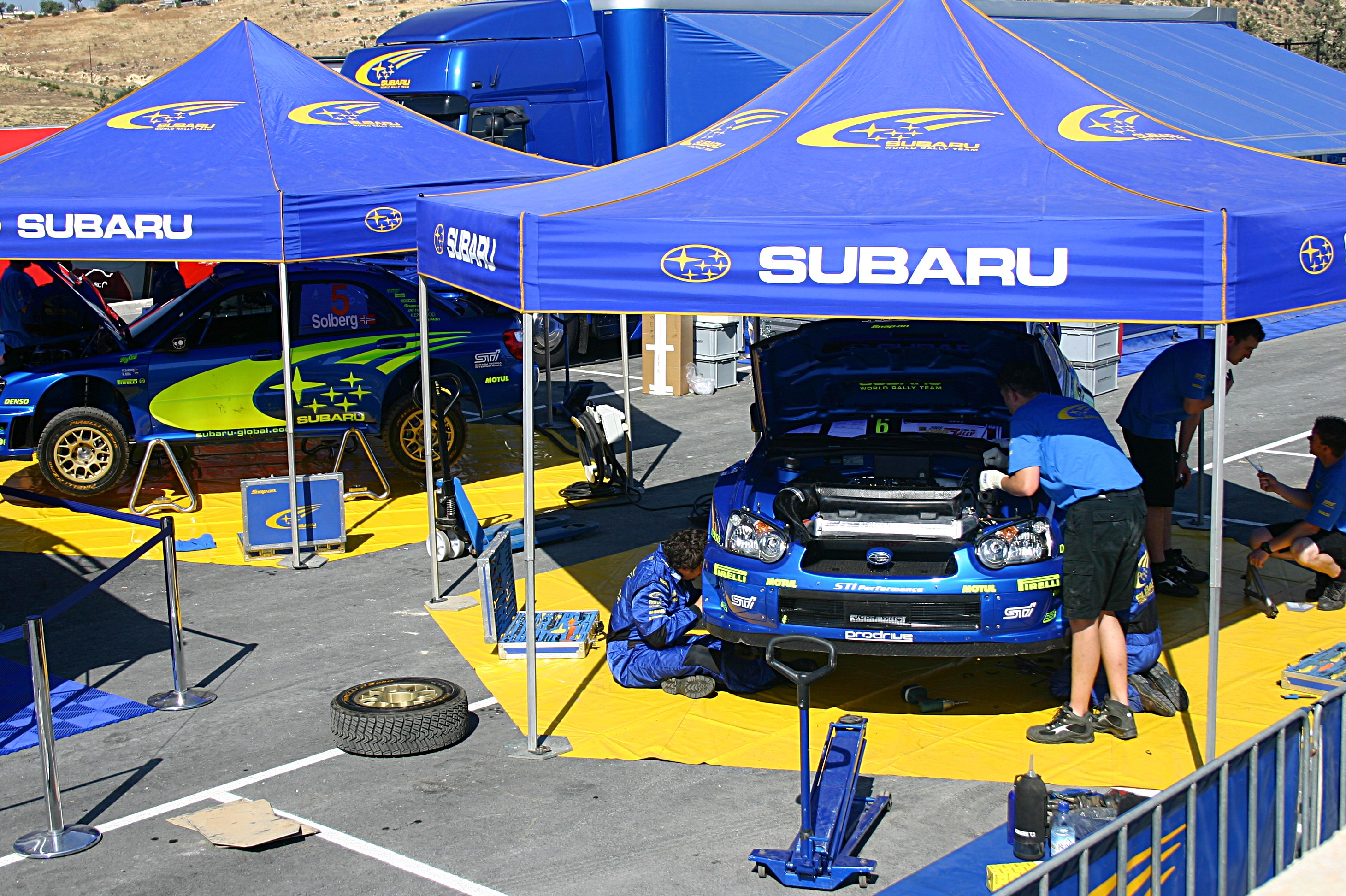
Subaru World Rally Team at the 2005 event

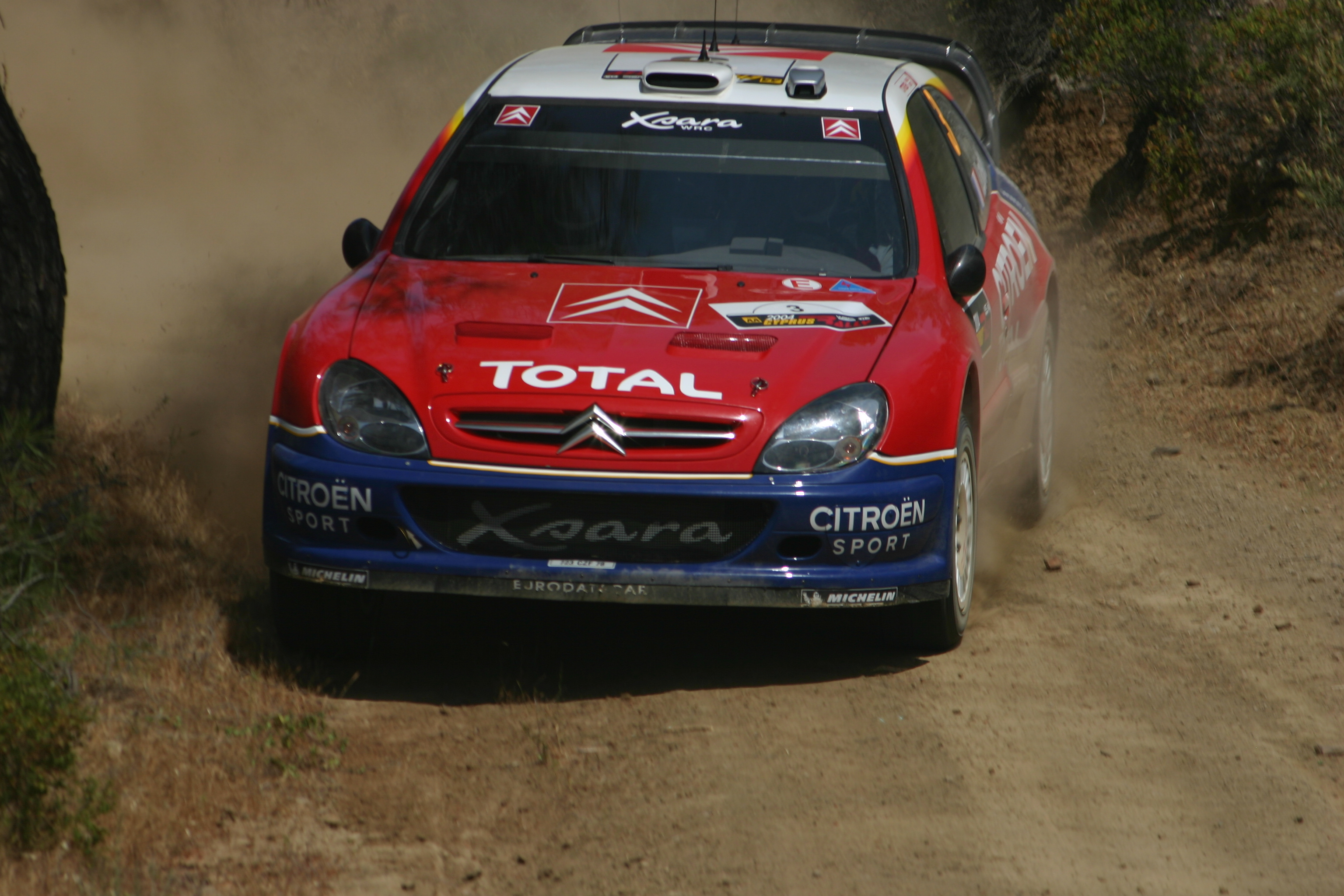
Sébastien Loeb at the 2004 event

The Cyprus Rally is a rallying competition held yearly in Cyprus since 1970. The event is run by the Cyprus Automobile Association and is based in the city of Limassol (Lemesos). It is run on the winding roads of the nearby mountains of Troödos. It was part of the FIA's World Rally Championship (WRC) from 2000 to 2006. In 2007 and 2008 the event was part of the FIA Middle East Rally Championship (MERC). The Cyprus Rally rejoined the WRC in 2009, taking advantage of the new regulations to become the only mixed surface event.

Between 2010 and 2012, the event was the final round of the Intercontinental Rally Challenge (IRC), as well as the penultimate round of the MERC (except in 2011, when it was separately held in July), including in 2013.

== Editions ==
Rally name	Stages	Podium finishers			
Rally name	Stages	Rank	Driver Co-driver	Car	Time
1983; European Rally Championship Cf. 4		1	(United Kingdom) Jimmy McRae (United Kingdom) Ian Grindrod	Opel Manta 400	
1984; European Rally Championship Cf. 4		1	(United States) John Buffum (United Kingdom) Fred Gallagher	Audi Quattro	
1985; European Rally Championship Cf. 4		1	(Italy) Mauro Pregliasco (Italy) Daniele Cianci	Lancia 037 Rally	
1986; European Rally Championship Cf. 4		1	(Belgium) Patrick Snijers (Belgium) Dany Colebunders	Lancia 037 Rally	
1987; European Rally Championship Cf. 4		1	(United Kingdom) David Llewellin (United Kingdom) Phil Short	Audi Coupé Quattro	
1988; European Rally Championship Cf. 20		1	(Sweden) Björn Waldegård (United Kingdom) Fred Gallagher	Toyota Celica GT-Four ST165	
1989; European Rally Championship Cf. 20		1	(France) Yves Loubet (France) Jean-Marc Andrié	Lancia Delta Integrale	
1990; European Rally Championship Cf. 20		1	(Cyprus) Dimi Mavropoulos (Cyprus) Nikos Antoniades	Audi Coupé Quattro	
1991; European Rally Championship Cf. 20		1	(Cyprus) Antonis Ieropoulos (Cyprus) Michael Michalakis	Mitsubishi Galant VR-4	
1992; European Rally Championship Cf. 20		1	(Italy) Alex Fiorio (Italy) Vittorio Brambilla	Lancia Delta HF Integrale	
1993; European Rally Championship Cf. 20		1	(Italy) Alex Fiorio (Italy) Vittorio Brambilla	Lancia Delta HF Integrale	
1994; European Rally Championship Cf. 20		1	(Italy) Alex Fiorio (Italy) Vittorio Brambilla	Lancia Delta HF Integrale	
1995; European Rally Championship Cf. 20		1	(Lebanon) "Bagheera" (Lebanon) Naji Stephan	Lancia Delta HF Integrale	
1996; European Rally Championship Cf. 20		1	(Germany) Armin Schwarz (France) Denis Giraudet	Toyota Celica GT-Four ST205	
1997; European Rally Championship Cf. 20		1	(Poland) Krzysztof Hołowczyc (Poland) Maciej Wisławski	Subaru Impreza 555	
1998; European Rally Championship Cf. 20		1	(Italy) Andrea Navarra (Italy) Alessandra Materazzetti	Subaru Impreza WRX	
1999; European Rally Championship Cf. 20		1	(Monaco) Jean-Pierre Richelmi (Belgium) Stéphane Prévot	Subaru Impreza WRC	
Cyprus Rally 2000; September 8–10, 2000; Round 10 of the 2000 WRC season	23 stages 348.41 km	1	(Spain) Carlos Sainz (Spain) Luís Moya	Ford Focus RS WRC 00	5:26:04.9
Cyprus Rally 2000; September 8–10, 2000; Round 10 of the 2000 WRC season	23 stages 348.41 km	2	(United Kingdom) Colin McRae (United Kingdom) Nicky Grist	Ford Focus RS WRC 00	5:26:42.2
Cyprus Rally 2000; September 8–10, 2000; Round 10 of the 2000 WRC season	23 stages 348.41 km	3	(France) François Delecour (France) Daniel Grataloup	Peugeot 206 WRC	5:27:35.7
Cyprus Rally 2001; June 1–3, 2001; Round 6 of the 2001 WRC season	21 stages 341.4 km	1	(United Kingdom) Colin McRae (United Kingdom) Nicky Grist	Ford Focus RS WRC 01	5:07:32.7
Cyprus Rally 2001; June 1–3, 2001; Round 6 of the 2001 WRC season	21 stages 341.4 km	2	(United Kingdom) Richard Burns (United Kingdom) Robert Reid	Subaru Impreza WRC 2001	5:07:49.1
Cyprus Rally 2001; June 1–3, 2001; Round 6 of the 2001 WRC season	21 stages 341.4 km	3	(Spain) Carlos Sainz (Spain) Luís Moya	Ford Focus RS WRC 01	5:07:59.2
31st Cyprus Rally; April 19–21, 2002; Round 5 of the 2002 WRC season	20 stages 324.17 km	1	(Finland) Marcus Grönholm (Finland) Timo Rautiainen	Peugeot 206 WRC	4:21:25.7
31st Cyprus Rally; April 19–21, 2002; Round 5 of the 2002 WRC season	20 stages 324.17 km	2	(United Kingdom) Richard Burns (United Kingdom) Robert Reid	Peugeot 206 WRC	4:22:22.5
31st Cyprus Rally; April 19–21, 2002; Round 5 of the 2002 WRC season	20 stages 324.17 km	3	(Finland) Tommi Mäkinen (Finland) Risto Mannisenmäki	Subaru Impreza WRC 2002	4:22:24.7
Cyprus Rally 2003; June 20–22, 2003; Round 7 of the 2003 WRC season	18 stages 341.05 km	1	(Norway) Petter Solberg (United Kingdom) Phil Mills	Subaru Impreza WRC 2003	5:09:12.6
Cyprus Rally 2003; June 20–22, 2003; Round 7 of the 2003 WRC season	18 stages 341.05 km	2	(Finland) Harri Rovanperä (Finland) Risto Pietiläinen	Peugeot 206 WRC	5:13:26.6
Cyprus Rally 2003; June 20–22, 2003; Round 7 of the 2003 WRC season	18 stages 341.05 km	3	(France) Sébastien Loeb (Monaco) Daniel Elena	Citroën Xsara WRC	5:13:29.4
Cyprus Rally 2004; May 13–16, 2004; Round 5 of the 2004 WRC season	18 stages 326.68 km	1 (Note: Marcus Grönholm finished first at the 2004 event with a time of 4:58:44.5, but he and his fifth-placed Peugeot team-mate Harri Rovanperä were later disqualified due to their cars' water pumps being non-standard.)	(France) Sébastien Loeb (Monaco) Daniel Elena	Citroën Xsara WRC	4:59:38.5
Cyprus Rally 2004; May 13–16, 2004; Round 5 of the 2004 WRC season	18 stages 326.68 km	2	(Estonia) Markko Märtin (United Kingdom) Michael Park	Ford Focus RS WRC 04	4:59:53.6
Cyprus Rally 2004; May 13–16, 2004; Round 5 of the 2004 WRC season	18 stages 326.68 km	3	(Spain) Carlos Sainz (Spain) Marc Martí	Citroën Xsara WRC	5:02:02.5
Cyprus Rally 2005; May 13–15, 2005; Round 6 of the 2005 WRC season	18 stages 326.68 km	1	(France) Sébastien Loeb (Monaco) Daniel Elena	Citroën Xsara WRC	5:02:29.4
Cyprus Rally 2005; May 13–15, 2005; Round 6 of the 2005 WRC season	18 stages 326.68 km	2	(Austria) Manfred Stohl (Austria) Ilka Minor	Citroën Xsara WRC	5:06:38.9
Cyprus Rally 2005; May 13–15, 2005; Round 6 of the 2005 WRC season	18 stages 326.68 km	3	(Estonia) Markko Märtin (United Kingdom) Michael Park	Peugeot 307 WRC	5:07:11.3
Cyprus Rally 2006; September 22–24, 2006; Round 12 of the 2006 WRC season	23 stages 331.34 km	1	(France) Sébastien Loeb (Monaco) Daniel Elena	Citroën Xsara WRC	4:40:50.4
Cyprus Rally 2006; September 22–24, 2006; Round 12 of the 2006 WRC season	23 stages 331.34 km	2	(Finland) Marcus Grönholm (Finland) Timo Rautiainen	Ford Focus RS WRC 06	4:41:11.6
Cyprus Rally 2006; September 22–24, 2006; Round 12 of the 2006 WRC season	23 stages 331.34 km	3	(Finland) Mikko Hirvonen (Finland) Jarmo Lehtinen	Ford Focus RS WRC 06	4:46:06.5
Cyprus Rally 2007; October 12–14, 2007; Part of the 2007 FIA MERC	9 stages	1	(Cyprus) Charalambos Timotheou (Cyprus) Pambos Laos	Mitsubishi Lancer Evo. IX Gr. N	3:04:11.1
Cyprus Rally 2007; October 12–14, 2007; Part of the 2007 FIA MERC	9 stages	2	(Qatar) Nasser Al-Attiyah (United Kingdom) Chris Patterson	Subaru Impreza N12 Gr. N	3:05:29.8
Cyprus Rally 2007; October 12–14, 2007; Part of the 2007 FIA MERC	9 stages	3	(Cyprus) Dimitris Papasavvas (Cyprus) Vangelis Xenofontos	Subaru Impreza N12 Gr. N	3:11:07.0
Cyprus Rally 2008; May 16–18, 2008; Part of the 2008 FIA MERC	8 stages	1	(Cyprus) Nicos Thomas (Cyprus) Spyros "Chips" Georgiou	Mitsubishi Lancer Evo. IX Gr. N	4:04:46.5
Cyprus Rally 2008; May 16–18, 2008; Part of the 2008 FIA MERC	8 stages	2	(Cyprus) Savvas Savva (Cyprus) Pambos Laos	Mitsubishi Lancer Evo. VIII Gr. N	4:05:12.7
Cyprus Rally 2008; May 16–18, 2008; Part of the 2008 FIA MERC	8 stages	3	(Qatar) Nasser Al-Attiyah (United Kingdom) Chris Patterson	Subaru Impreza N12 Gr. N	4:08:09.9
2009 Cyprus Rally; March 13–15, 2009; Part of the 2009 WRC season	14 stages	1	(France) Sébastien Loeb (Monaco) Daniel Elena	Citroën C4 WRC	4:50:34
2009 Cyprus Rally; March 13–15, 2009; Part of the 2009 WRC season	14 stages	2	(Finland) Mikko Hirvonen (Finland) Jarmo Lehtinen	Ford Focus RS WRC 08	4:51:01.9
2009 Cyprus Rally; March 13–15, 2009; Part of the 2009 WRC season	14 stages	3	(Norway) Petter Solberg (United Kingdom) Phil Mills	Citroën Xsara WRC	4:52:24.1
2010 Cyprus Rally; November 4–6, 2010; Part of the 2010 IRC season and 2010 MERC season	14 stages	1	(Qatar) Nasser Al-Attiyah (Italy) Giovanni Bernacchini	Ford Fiesta S2000	3:11:53.5
2010 Cyprus Rally; November 4–6, 2010; Part of the 2010 IRC season and 2010 MERC season	14 stages	2	(Lebanon) Roger Feghali (Lebanon) Joseph Matar	Škoda Fabia S2000	3:12:24.2
2010 Cyprus Rally; November 4–6, 2010; Part of the 2010 IRC season and 2010 MERC season	14 stages	3	(Czech Republic) Martin Prokop (Czech Republic) Jan Tománek	Ford Fiesta S2000	3:16:35.5
2011 Cyprus Rally; November 3–5, 2011; Part of the 2011 IRC season	11 stages	1	(Norway) Andreas Mikkelsen (Norway) Ola Fløene	Škoda Fabia S2000	2:25:18.5
2011 Cyprus Rally; November 3–5, 2011; Part of the 2011 IRC season	11 stages	2	(Czech Republic) Jan Kopecký (Czech Republic) Pavel Dresler	Škoda Fabia S2000	2:26:59.0
2011 Cyprus Rally; November 3–5, 2011; Part of the 2011 IRC season	11 stages	3	(Sweden) Patrik Sandell (Sweden) Staffan Parmander	Škoda Fabia S2000	2:28:13.3
2012 Cyprus Rally; November 2–4, 2012; Part of the 2012 IRC season and 2012 MERC season	13 stages	1	(Qatar) Nasser Al-Attiyah (Italy) Giovanni Bernacchini	Ford Fiesta RRC	3:16:25.2
2012 Cyprus Rally; November 2–4, 2012; Part of the 2012 IRC season and 2012 MERC season	13 stages	2	(Norway) Andreas Mikkelsen (Norway) Ola Fløene	Škoda Fabia S2000	3:20:00.5
2012 Cyprus Rally; November 2–4, 2012; Part of the 2012 IRC season and 2012 MERC season	13 stages	3	(Japan) Toshihiro Arai (Australia) Dale Moscatt	Subaru Impreza STi R4	3:26:32.3
2013 Cyprus Rally; October 9–10, 2013; Part of the 2013 MERC season	13 stages	1	(Qatar) Nasser Al-Attiyah (Italy) Giovanni Bernacchini	Ford Fiesta RRC	2:35:17.6
2013 Cyprus Rally; October 9–10, 2013; Part of the 2013 MERC season	13 stages	2	(United Arab Emirates) Khalid Al-Qassimi (United Kingdom) Martin Scott	Citroën DS3 RRC	2:38:09.4
2013 Cyprus Rally; October 9–10, 2013; Part of the 2013 MERC season	13 stages	3	(Qatar) Abdulaziz Al-Kuwari (Republic of Ireland) Duffy Killian	Ford Fiesta RRC	2:38:14.1
2014 Cyprus Rally; 19–21 September; Part of the 2014 ERC season and 2014 MERC season		1	(Saudi Arabia) Yazeed Al Rajihi	Ford Fiesta RRC	3:04:14.4
2014 Cyprus Rally; 19–21 September; Part of the 2014 ERC season and 2014 MERC season		2	(Poland) Kajetan Kajetanowicz	Ford Fiesta R5	3:04:33.3
2014 Cyprus Rally; 19–21 September; Part of the 2014 ERC season and 2014 MERC season		3	(Qatar) Abdulaziz Al-Kuwari	Ford Fiesta RRC	3:05:14.9
2015 Cyprus Rally; 25–27 September; Part of the 2015 ERC season and 2015 MERC season	16 stages	1	(Qatar) Nasser Al-Attiyah	Ford Fiesta RRC	2:08:38.4
2015 Cyprus Rally; 25–27 September; Part of the 2015 ERC season and 2015 MERC season	16 stages	2	(Poland) Kajetan Kajetanowicz	Ford Fiesta R5	2:08:45.4
2015 Cyprus Rally; 25–27 September; Part of the 2015 ERC season and 2015 MERC season	16 stages	3	(Qatar) Abdulaziz Al-Kuwari	Ford Fiesta RRC	2:12:38.4
2016 Cyprus Rally; 7–9 August; Part of the 2016 ERC Season and 2016 MERC season	14 stages	1	(Russia) Alexey Lukyanuk	Ford Fiesta R5	2:06:55.9
2016 Cyprus Rally; 7–9 August; Part of the 2016 ERC Season and 2016 MERC season	14 stages	2	(Germany) Marijan Griebel	Škoda Fabia R5	2:09:08.1
2016 Cyprus Rally; 7–9 August; Part of the 2016 ERC Season and 2016 MERC season	14 stages	3	(Latvia) Ralfs Sirmacis	Škoda Fabia R5	2:09:51.9
2017 Cyprus Rally; 16–18 June; Part of the 2017 ERC season and 2017 MERC season	14 stages	1	(Qatar) Nasser Al-Attiyah	Ford Fiesta R5	2:31:44.3
2017 Cyprus Rally; 16–18 June; Part of the 2017 ERC season and 2017 MERC season	14 stages	2	(Cyprus) Simos Galatariotis	Mitsubishi Lancer Evo X R4	2:37:56.3
2017 Cyprus Rally; 16–18 June; Part of the 2017 ERC season and 2017 MERC season	14 stages	3	(Cyprus) Polykarpou Panikos	Mitsubishi Lancer Evo IX	2:38:03.8
2018 Cyprus Rally; 15–17 June; Part of the 2018 ERC season and 2018 MERC season	13 stages	1	(Cyprus) Simos Galatariotis	Škoda Fabia R5	1:55:40.2
2018 Cyprus Rally; 15–17 June; Part of the 2018 ERC season and 2018 MERC season	13 stages	2	(Portugal) Bruno Magalhães	Škoda Fabia R5	1:55:40.8
2018 Cyprus Rally; 15–17 June; Part of the 2018 ERC season and 2018 MERC season	13 stages	3	(Hungary) Norbert Herczig	Škoda Fabia R5	1:57:01.6
2019 Cyprus Rally; 27–29 September; Part of the 2019 ERC season and 2019 MERC season	12 stages	1	(Qatar) Nasser Al-Attiyah (France) Matthieu Baumel	Volkswagen Polo GTI R5	3:02:51.3
2019 Cyprus Rally; 27–29 September; Part of the 2019 ERC season and 2019 MERC season	12 stages	2 (Note: Simos Galatariotis finished second at the 2019 event with a time of 3:05:28.8, but he and his Škoda co-driver Antonis Ioannou were later disqualified after failing to adhering to Parc Ferme rules.)	(United Kingdom) Chris Ingram (United Kingdom) Ross Whittock	Škoda Fabia R5	3:06:42.2
2019 Cyprus Rally; 27–29 September; Part of the 2019 ERC season and 2019 MERC season	12 stages	3	(Finland) Mikko Hirvonen (Finland) Jarno Ottman	Ford Fiesta R5	3:07:25.3
2020 Cyprus Rally; 16–18 October; Part of the 2020 MERC season	11 stages	1	(Qatar) Nasser Al-Attiyah (France) Matthieu Baumel	Volkswagen Polo GTI R5	2:46:25.1
2020 Cyprus Rally; 16–18 October; Part of the 2020 MERC season	11 stages	2	(Cyprus) Panayiotis Yiangou (Cyprus) Panagiotis Kyriakou	Hyundai i20 R5	3:03:35.5
2020 Cyprus Rally; 16–18 October; Part of the 2020 MERC season	11 stages	3	(Cyprus) Christos Demosthenous (Cyprus) Kostas Pavlou	Mitsubishi Lancer Evo IX	3:05:28.3
2021 Cyprus Rally; 24–26 September; Part of the 2021 MERC season	12 stages	1	(Cyprus) Alexandros Tsouloftas (Cyprus) Stelios Elia	Volkswagen Polo GTI R5	3:07:28.5
2021 Cyprus Rally; 24–26 September; Part of the 2021 MERC season	12 stages	2	(Cyprus) Petros Panteli (Cyprus) Pambos Laos	Citroën DS3 R5	3:15:30.8
2021 Cyprus Rally; 24–26 September; Part of the 2021 MERC season	12 stages	3	(Oman) Abdullah Al-Rawahi (Jordan) Ata Al-Hmoud	Ford Fiesta R5	3:16:12.8
2023 Cyprus Rally; 6–8 October; Part of the 2023 MERC season	12 stages	1	(Qatar) Nasser Al-Attiyah (France) Matthieu Baumel	Volkswagen Polo GTI R5	3:03:38.7
2023 Cyprus Rally; 6–8 October; Part of the 2023 MERC season	12 stages	2	(Oman) Abdullah Al-Rawahi (Jordan) Ata Al-Hmoud	Škoda Fabia Rally2 evo	3:07:00.0
2023 Cyprus Rally; 6–8 October; Part of the 2023 MERC season	12 stages	3	(Cyprus) Christos Demosthenous (Cyprus) Kypros Christodoulou	Škoda Fabia R5	3:10:16.7
2024 Cyprus Rally; 18–20 October; Part of the 2024 MERC season	12 stages	1	(Qatar) Nasser Al-Attiyah (Italy) Giovanni Bernacchini	Škoda Fabia Rally2 evo	2:47:00.0
2024 Cyprus Rally; 18–20 October; Part of the 2024 MERC season	12 stages	2	(Cyprus) Panayiotis Yiangou (Cyprus) Aristos Nikolaou	Hyundai i20 R5	2:55:19.3
2024 Cyprus Rally; 18–20 October; Part of the 2024 MERC season	12 stages	3	(Qatar) Abdulaziz Al-Kuwari (Qatar) Nasser Al-Kuwari	Škoda Fabia Rally2 evo	2:56:46.2
