= Kuwait International Rally =

The Kuwait International Rally (known originally as the Kuwait Rally, is an international rallying event held on the coastline of Kuwait between the capital Kuwait City and the border with Saudi Arabia.

The rally, held on gravel roads and sand for the most part, has consistently been part of the Middle East Rally Championship but its history has been intermittent as Kuwait has been embroiled in armed conflict, first with the 1990 Iraqi invasion and the Gulf War and Iraq War which followed.

== List of previous winners ==
List of winners sourced in part from:

| Year | Winner | Car |
|---|---|---|
| 1978 | Bill Murphy (IRL) & Vincent Labbate (US) | Volvo 240 |
| 1984 | (Lebanon) Michel Saleh | Toyota Celica GT |
| 1985 | (United Arab Emirates) Mohammed Ben Sulayem | Toyota Celica TCT |
| 1986 | Not held | |
| 1987 | (Qatar) Saeed Al-Hajri | Porsche 911 SC |
| 1988 | (United Arab Emirates) Mohammed Ben Sulayem | Toyota Celica TCT |
| 1989 | (United Arab Emirates) Mohammed Ben Sulayem | Toyota Celica GT-Four |
| 1990 - 1994 | Not held | |
| 1995 | (Saudi Arabia) Abdullah Bakhashab | Ford Escort RS Cosworth |
| 1996 | (United Arab Emirates) Mohammed Ben Sulayem | Ford Escort RS Cosworth |
| 1997 - 2008 | Not held | |
| 2009 | (Qatar) Nasser Al-Attiyah | Subaru Impreza WRX |
| 2010 | (United Arab Emirates) Khalid Al-Qassimi | Ford Fiesta S2000 |
| 2011 | (Qatar) Nasser Al-Attiyah | Ford Fiesta S2000 |
| 2012 | (Qatar) Khalid Mohammad Al-Suwaidi | Ford Fiesta S2000 |
| 2013 | (Qatar) Nasser Al-Attiyah | Ford Fiesta RRC |
| 2014 | (Qatar) Nasser Al-Attiyah | Ford Fiesta RRC |
| 2015 | (Qatar) Nasser Al-Attiyah | Ford Fiesta RRC |
| 2016 | (Qatar) Nasser Al-Attiyah | Škoda Fabia R5 |
| 2017 | Not held | |
| 2018 | (Qatar) Nasser Al-Attiyah | Ford Fiesta R5 |
