= 2013 British Rally Championship =

Seasons
- ← 2012 2014 →

The 2013 MSA British Rally Championship season was the 55th season of the British Rally Championship. The season began on 6 April in Welshpool and ended on 18 October in Poole.

== Season summary ==
Finnish driver Jukka Korhonen lead the championship after four events having taken two victories and a second place.

== Race calendar and results ==
The 2013 calendar consists of seven rounds.

Round	Rally name	Podium finishers				Statistics			
Round	Rally name	Rank	Driver	Car	Time	Stages	Length	Starters	Finishers
1	Bulldog Rally North Wales (6–7 April)	event cancelled due to poor weather							
2	Pirelli Richard Burns Foundation Rally (4–5 May)	1	(Finland) Jukka Korhonen	Citroën DS3 R3T	1:13:57.7	10	124.76 km	27	19
2	Pirelli Richard Burns Foundation Rally (4–5 May)	2	(United Kingdom) Alastair Fisher	Citroën DS3 R3T	1:14:40.2	10	124.76 km	27	19
2	Pirelli Richard Burns Foundation Rally (4–5 May)	3	(United Kingdom) Tom Cave	Citroën DS3 R3T	1:15:07.1	10	124.76 km	27	19
3	Jim Clark Rally (31 May–1 June)	1	(Finland) Jukka Korhonen	Citroën DS3 R3T	1:34:53.7	14	173.39 km	26	20
3	Jim Clark Rally (31 May–1 June)	2	(United Kingdom) Tom Cave	Citroën DS3 R3T	1:34:55.7	14	173.39 km	26	20
3	Jim Clark Rally (31 May–1 June)	3	(United Kingdom) Osian Pryce	Citroën DS3 R3T	1:35:07.5	14	173.39 km	26	20
4	RSAC Scottish Rally (28–29 June)	1	(United Kingdom) Alastair Fisher	Citroën DS3 R3T	0:59:51.9	9	119.32 km	22	18
4	RSAC Scottish Rally (28–29 June)	2	(Finland) Jukka Korhonen	Citroën DS3 R3T	1:00:06.4	9	119.32 km	22	18
4	RSAC Scottish Rally (28–29 June)	3	(United Kingdom) Tom Cave	Citroën DS3 R3T	1:00:17.1	9	119.32 km	22	18
5	Rally Northern Ireland (23–24 August)	1	(United Kingdom) Osian Pryce	Citroën DS3 R3T	2:05:36.7	15	208.96 km	22	17
5	Rally Northern Ireland (23–24 August)	2	(Finland) Jukka Korhonen	Citroën DS3 R3T	2:06:27.6	15	208.96 km	22	17
5	Rally Northern Ireland (23–24 August)	3	(United Kingdom) Mark Donnelly	Citroën DS3 R3T	2:07:15.4	15	208.96 km	22	17
6	Trackrod Rally Yorkshire (27–28 September)	1	(United Kingdom) Osian Pryce	Citroën DS3 R3T	1:01:50.3	7	96.37 km	22	18
6	Trackrod Rally Yorkshire (27–28 September)	2	(Finland) Jukka Korhonen	Citroën DS3 R3T	1:02:00.2	7	96.37 km	22	18
6	Trackrod Rally Yorkshire (27–28 September)	3	(United Kingdom) Alastair Fisher	Citroën DS3 R3T	1:02:03.4	7	96.37 km	22	18
7	Rallye Sunseeker (18–19 October)	1	(United Kingdom) Osian Pryce	Citroën DS3 R3T	0:58:48.8	10	92.34 km	19	15
7	Rallye Sunseeker (18–19 October)	2	(United Kingdom) Tom Cave	Citroën DS3 R3T	0:59:03.2	10	92.34 km	19	15
7	Rallye Sunseeker (18–19 October)	3	(Finland) Jukka Korhonen	Citroën DS3 R3T	0:59:27.7	10	92.34 km	19	15

== Drivers championship standings ==
Top 16 positions

Pos	Driver	Vehicle	PIR	JCR	SCO	ULS	YOR	SUN	Pts
1	(Finland) Jukka Korhonen	Citroën DS3 R3T	1	1	2	2	2	3	100
2	(United Kingdom) Osian Pryce	Citroën DS3 R3T	13	3	Ret	1	1	1	92
3	(United Kingdom) Tom Cave	Citroën DS3 R3T	3	2	3	10	4	2	92
4	(United Kingdom) Alastair Fisher	Citroën DS3 R3T	2	4	1	15	3	4	91.5
5	(United Kingdom) Jonathan Greer	Citroën DS3 R3T	4	5	5	4	7	6	77.5
6	(United Kingdom) Mark Donnelly	Citroën DS3 R3T	Ret	6	6	3	5	5	77
8	(United Kingdom) John MacCrone	Citroën DS3 R3T	5	Ret	4	Ret	6	7	60
9	(Republic of Ireland) Daniel McKenna	Ford Fiesta R2	9	7	8	5	10	10	59.5
10	(Norway) Steve Rokland	Ford Fiesta R2	6	11	13	7	12	9	55
11	(United Kingdom) Alex Parpottas	Ford Fiesta R2	12	12	Ret	8	13	11	43
12	(United Kingdom) Jon Armstrong	Ford Fiesta R2	11	14	14	Ret	11	Ret	26
13	(United Kingdom) James Grint	Citroën DS3 R3T	14		15	17	9		25
14	(Republic of Ireland) David Carney	Citroën C2 R2 Max	19	15	Ret	9	Ret	13	24
15	(United Kingdom) Peter Taylor	Citroën DS3 R3T	7	9					22
16	(Republic of Ireland) Joseph McGonigle	Renault Clio R3	10	Ret	7	Ret			21
Pos	Driver	Vehicle	PIR	JCR	SCO	ULS	YOR	SUN	Pts

Key
Colour	Result
Gold	Winner
Silver	2nd place
Bronze	3rd place
Green	Non-podium finish
Purple	Did not finish (Ret)
Black	Disqualified (DSQ)
Black	Excluded (EXC)
White	Did not start (DNS)
*	Joker played

Points are awarded to the highest placed registered driver on each event as follows: 20, 18, 16, 15, and so on deleting one point per placing down to one single point for all finishers.
