= 2014 British Rally Championship =

Seasons
- ← 2013 2016 →

The 2014 MSA British Rally Championship was the 56th season of the British Rally Championship. The season began on 3 May in Carlisle with the Pirelli Richard Burns Foundation Rally and ended on 13 September in Douglas with the Rally Isle of Man powered by Microgaming.

The championship was won by the Irish crew of Daniel McKenna and Arthur Kierans, who won four of the season's six rallies, to win the championship by eleven points ahead of Osian Pryce and Dale Furniss; Pryce and Furniss won the other two events to be held.

== Event calendar and results ==
The 2014 calendar consisted of six rounds at five events with a double header held at the Rally Isle of Man. A seventh event, Rallye Dorset, was cancelled in July.

Round	Rally name	Podium finishers				Statistics			
Round	Rally name	Rank	Driver	Car	Time	Stages	Length	Starters	Finishers
1	Pirelli Carlisle RB Foundation Rally (4–5 May)	1	(United Kingdom) Osian Pryce	Citroën DS3 R3T	1:25:26.4	10	137.18 km	14	11
1	Pirelli Carlisle RB Foundation Rally (4–5 May)	2	(Republic of Ireland) Daniel McKenna	Citroën DS3 R3T	1:26:12.4	10	137.18 km	14	11
1	Pirelli Carlisle RB Foundation Rally (4–5 May)	3	(Republic of Ireland) David Carney	Citroën DS3 R3T	1:31:02.6	10	137.18 km	14	11
2	Jim Clark Rally (30–31 May)	1	(Republic of Ireland) Daniel McKenna	Citroën DS3 R3T	1:47:20.0	16	195.81 km	19	10
2	Jim Clark Rally (30–31 May)	2	(United Kingdom) Osian Pryce	Citroën DS3 R3T	1:47:36.0	16	195.81 km	19	10
2	Jim Clark Rally (30–31 May)	3	(United Kingdom) Callum Black	Citroën DS3 R3T	1:52:21.1	16	195.81 km	19	10
3	RSAC Scottish Rally (27–28 June)	1	(Republic of Ireland) Daniel McKenna	Citroën DS3 R3T	1:08:58.8	10	117.14 km	46	18
3	RSAC Scottish Rally (27–28 June)	2	(United Kingdom) Callum Black	Citroën DS3 R3T	1:11:08.3	10	117.14 km	46	18
3	RSAC Scottish Rally (27–28 June)	3	(Republic of Ireland) Dean Raftery	Ford Fiesta R2	1:11:30.2	10	117.14 km	46	18
4	Todds Leap Ulster Rally (15–16 August) (Note: The event was cancelled after the death of competitor Timothy Cathcart on SS3. Event results were taken at the end of SS3.)	1	(Republic of Ireland) Daniel McKenna	Citroën DS3 R3T	29:00.6	3	51.13 km	6	5
4	Todds Leap Ulster Rally (15–16 August)	2	(United Kingdom) Osian Pryce	Citroën DS3 R3T	29:31.9	3	51.13 km	6	5
4	Todds Leap Ulster Rally (15–16 August)	3	(Republic of Ireland) Dean Raftery	Ford Fiesta R2	29:50.6	3	51.13 km	6	5
5	Rally Isle of Man powered by Microgaming Leg 1 (11–12 September)	1	(United Kingdom) Osian Pryce	Citroën DS3 R3T	49:50.6	9	86.24 km	6	5
5	Rally Isle of Man powered by Microgaming Leg 1 (11–12 September)	2	(Republic of Ireland) Calvin Beattie	Ford Fiesta R2	57:03.5	9	86.24 km	6	5
5	Rally Isle of Man powered by Microgaming Leg 1 (11–12 September)	3	(United Kingdom) Gus Greensmith	Ford Fiesta R1	58:10.2	9	86.24 km	6	5
6	Rally Isle of Man powered by Microgaming Leg 2 (12–13 September)	1	(Republic of Ireland) Daniel McKenna	Citroën DS3 R3T	1:16:46.5	13	133.11 km	5	5
6	Rally Isle of Man powered by Microgaming Leg 2 (12–13 September)	2	(Republic of Ireland) Dean Raferty	Ford Fiesta R2	1:21:01.8	13	133.11 km	5	5
6	Rally Isle of Man powered by Microgaming Leg 2 (12–13 September)	3	(Republic of Ireland) Calvin Beattie	Ford Fiesta R2	1:21:20.9	13	133.11 km	5	5

== Championship standings ==
=== Drivers' championship ===
A driver's best five scores counted towards the final championship standings. Points were awarded to the highest placed registered driver on each event as follows: 20, 18, 16, 15, and so on deleting one point per placing down to one single point for all finishers. The second leg of the Rally Isle of Man awarded points at a coefficient of 1.5; thus 30 points were awarded to its winner.

Pos	Driver	Vehicle	PIR	JCR	SCO	ULS	RIM		Pts
1	(Republic of Ireland) Daniel McKenna	Citroën DS3 R3T	2	1	1	1	4	1	108
2	(United Kingdom) Osian Pryce	Citroën DS3 R3T	1	2	Ret	2	1	5	97
3	(Republic of Ireland) Dean Raftery	Ford Fiesta R2	4		3	3	5	2	87
4	(Republic of Ireland) Calvin Beattie	Ford Fiesta R2	5	5		4	2	3	85
5	(United Kingdom) Gus Greensmith	Ford Fiesta R1	8	9	6	5	3	4	76.5
6	(United Kingdom) Callum Black	Citroën DS3 R3T	Ret	3	2				34
7	(United Kingdom) Garry Pearson	Peugeot 208 VTi R2	Ret	4	4				30
8	(United Kingdom) Jonathan Jones	Ford Fiesta R1	10	10	7				30
9	(Republic of Ireland) David Carney	Citroën DS3 R3T	3	Ret					16
10	(Venezuela) Rene Dias Torcato	Citroën C2 R2 Max			5				14
11	(United Kingdom) Timothy Cathcart	Citroën DS3 R3T	6	Ret	Ret	Ret			13
12	(United Kingdom) Cameron Davies	Ford Fiesta R2		6					13
13	(United Kingdom) Aaron McClure	Ford Fiesta R2	7	Ret	Ret				12
14	(United Kingdom) Chris Wheeler	Ford Fiesta MS1		7			Ret	DNS	12
15	(United Kingdom) Harry Threlfall	Renault Twingo RS R1		8					11
16	(United Kingdom) Kim Baker	Renault Twingo RS R1	9	Ret					10
Pos	Driver	Vehicle	PIR	JCR	SCO	ULS	RIM		Pts

Key
Colour	Result
Gold	Winner
Silver	2nd place
Bronze	3rd place
Green	Non-podium finish
Purple	Did not finish (Ret)
Black	Disqualified (DSQ)
Black	Excluded (EXC)
White	Did not start (DNS)
*	Joker played
