= 2016 British Rally Championship =

Seasons
- ← 2014 2017 →

The 2016 MSA British Rally Championship was the 57th season of the British Rally Championship after a one-year absence.

The championship featured eight classes:

- BRC 1 (R5, R4, Super 2000, Regional Rally Car)
- BRC 2 (N4)
- BRC 3 (R3)
- BRC 4 (R2)
- BRC 5 (R1)
- BRC GT (Porsche 911 RGT)
- National Rally Cup (open class)
- Junior BRC (R2, drivers under 26 years old)

For the first time since 2011, the BRC had four-wheel drive classes.

== Calendar ==
The 2016 championship was contested over seven rounds

Round	Dates	Rally name	Surface
1	5–6 March	Mid Wales Stages	Gravel
2	8–9 April	Circuit of Ireland	Tarmac
3	30 April–1 May	Pirelli Rally	Gravel
4	25 June	RSAC Scottish Rally	Gravel
5	9–10 July	Nicky Grist Stages	Mixed
6	19–20 August	Ulster Rally	Tarmac
7	15–17 September	Rally Isle of Man	Tarmac

== Teams and Drivers ==
BRC1 Entries

Constructor	Car	Team	Driver	Co Driver	Rounds
Ford	Ford Fiesta R5	(United Kingdom) DMACK British Rally Team	(United Kingdom) Elfyn Evans	(United Kingdom) Craig Parry	All
Ford	Ford Fiesta R5	(United Kingdom) DMACK British Rally Team	(Finland) Max Vatanen	(France) Jacques-Julien Renucci	1–3
Ford	Ford Fiesta R5	(United Kingdom) Spencer Sport	(United Kingdom) Tom Cave	(United Kingdom) James Morgan	All
Ford	Ford Fiesta R5	(United Kingdom) CA1 Sport Ltd	(Sweden) Fredrik Åhlin	(Norway) Morten Erik Abrahamsen	All
Ford	Ford Fiesta R5	(United Kingdom) CA1 Sport Ltd	(United Kingdom) Alex Laffey	(United Kingdom) Andrew Roughhead	All
Ford	Ford Fiesta R5	(United Kingdom) MSL Motorsport	(United Kingdom) Jamie Anderson	(United Kingdom) Ross Whittock	All
Ford	Ford Fiesta R5	(United Kingdom) MSL Motorsport	(United Kingdom) Rhys Yates	(United Kingdom) Tom Woodburn	All
Ford	Ford Fiesta R5	(Republic of Ireland) Combilift Rallying	(Republic of Ireland) Josh Moffett	(Republic of Ireland) John Rowan	1–2, 4–6
Ford	Ford Fiesta R5	(Republic of Ireland) Combilift Rallying	(Republic of Ireland) Sam Moffett	(Republic of Ireland) Karl Atkinson	1–2, 6
Ford	Ford Fiesta R5	(United Kingdom) Dom Buckley Motorsport	(United Kingdom) Hugh Hunter	(United Kingdom) Andy Marchbank	1–2
Ford	Ford Fiesta R5	(United Kingdom) Dom Buckley Motorsport	(United Kingdom) Robert Woodside	(United Kingdom) Allan Harryman	1–2, 6
Ford	Ford Fiesta R5	(United Kingdom) Tiger Risk Rally Team	(United Kingdom) James Slaughter	(United Kingdom) James Whitaker	1–3, 5
Ford	Ford Fiesta R5	(United Kingdom) Tiger Risk Rally Team	(United Kingdom) James Slaughter	(United Kingdom) Patrick Walsh	6
Ford	Ford Fiesta R5	(United Kingdom) M-Sport World Rally Team	(United Kingdom) Matthew Wilson	(United Kingdom) Stuart Loudon	3
Ford	Ford Fiesta R5	(United Kingdom) The Sun WD-40 Rally Team	(United Kingdom) Rob Gill	(United Kingdom) Anders Howard	3
Ford	Ford Fiesta R5	(United Kingdom) Swift Group	(United Kingdom) Matt Edwards	(United Kingdom) Will Rogers	6–7
Ford	Ford Fiesta S2000	(United Kingdom) Get Connected	(United Kingdom) Damian Cole	(United Kingdom) Paul Morris	1–2, 5
Citroën	Citroën DS3 R5	(United Kingdom) DGM Sport	(Republic of Ireland) Keith Cronin	(Republic of Ireland) Mikie Galvin	1–2, 6
Citroën	Citroën DS3 R5	(United Kingdom) DGM Sport	(United Kingdom) Jonathan Greer	(United Kingdom) Kirsty Riddick	All
Skoda	Škoda Fabia R5	(United Kingdom) CA1 Sport Ltd	(United Kingdom) David Bogie	(United Kingdom) Kevin Rae	1–5
Skoda	Škoda Fabia R5	(United Kingdom) CA1 Sport Ltd	(United Kingdom) David Bogie	(Republic of Ireland) James O'Reilly	6–7
Skoda	Škoda Fabia R5	(United Kingdom) CA1 Sport Ltd	(United Kingdom) Thomas Preston	(United Kingdom) Jack Morton	3–5
Skoda	Škoda Fabia R5	(United Kingdom) CA1 Sport Ltd	(United Kingdom) Thomas Preston	(United Kingdom) Carl Williamson	7
Skoda	Škoda Fabia R5	(Republic of Ireland) Macsport Rally Team	(United Kingdom) Desi Henry	(Republic of Ireland) Liam Moynihan	All
Skoda	Škoda Fabia R5	(United Kingdom) Simpsons Škoda Motorsport	(United Kingdom) Neil Simpson	(United Kingdom) Elliot Edmondson	1–3
Skoda	Škoda Fabia S2000	(United Kingdom) Tiger Risk Rally Team	(United Kingdom) Martin McCormack	(Republic of Ireland) David Moynihan	1–3, 6
Peugeot	Peugeot 208 T16 R5	(United Kingdom) Euan Thorburn Rally Team	(United Kingdom) Euan Thorburn	(United Kingdom) Paul Beaton	1–4
Proton	Proton Satria Neo S2000	(Malaysia) Proton Motorsports	(United Kingdom) Oliver Mellors	(United Kingdom) Ian Windress	All

BRC2 Entries

Constructor	Car	Team	Driver	Co Driver	Rounds
Mitsubishi	Mitsubishi Lancer Evo IX	(United Kingdom) Swift Group	(United Kingdom) Matt Edwards	(United Kingdom) Will Rogers	1–5
Mitsubishi	Mitsubishi Lancer Evo IX	(United Kingdom) Mitsubishi Ralliart UK	(United Kingdom) Phillip Morrow	(United Kingdom) Jonny Hart	1–2
Mitsubishi	Mitsubishi Lancer Evo IX	(Republic of Ireland) Patrick O'Brien Rallying	(Republic of Ireland) Patrick O'Brien	(Republic of Ireland) Stephen O'Brien	2
Mitsubishi	Mitsubishi Lancer Evo X	(United Kingdom) Hyundai Genpower Rally Team	(United Kingdom) Roland Llewellin	(United Kingdom) Jack Morton	1–2
Subaru	Subaru Impreza WRX STI	(United Kingdom) SW Motorsport	(United Kingdom) Spencer Wilkinson	(United Kingdom) Glyn Thomas	1, 3

BRC3 Entries

Constructor	Car	Team	Driver	Co Driver	Rounds
Citroën	Citroën DS3 R3T	(United Kingdom) Chris Wheeler Rallying	(United Kingdom) Chris Wheeler	(United Kingdom) Yan Griffiths	1, 3–5
Toyota	Toyota GT86 CS-R3	(Germany) Toyota Motorsport	(United Kingdom) Chris Harris	(United Kingdom) Brynmor Pierce	1
Toyota	Toyota GT86 CS-R3	(Germany) Toyota Motorsport	(United Kingdom) Will Cory	(United Kingdom) Brynmor Pierce	6–7

BRC4 Entries

Constructor	Car	Team	Driver	Co Driver	Rounds
Ford	Ford Fiesta R2T	(United Kingdom) Melvyn Evans Motorsport	(India) Amittrajit Ghosh	(India) Ashwin Naik	1
Ford	Ford Fiesta ST	(United Kingdom) SIMS Rally Team	(United Kingdom) Tony Simpson	(United Kingdom) Ian Bevan	1, 3–5, 7
Ford	Ford Fiesta R2	(United Kingdom) Athreton Racing	(United Kingdom) Gee Atherton	(United Kingdom) Keaton Williams	1, 3–4, 6
Ford	Ford Fiesta R2	(United Kingdom) MH Motorsport	(United Kingdom) Roger Platt	(United Kingdom) Ian Davis	1
Ford	Ford Fiesta R2	(United Kingdom) MH Motorsport	(United Kingdom) Roger Platt	(United Kingdom) John Jarrett	3
Ford	Ford Fiesta R2	(United Kingdom) MH Motorsport	(United Kingdom) Roger Platt	(United Kingdom) Keegan Rees	5
Ford	Ford Fiesta R2	(Republic of Ireland) Mc Connell Motorsport	(Republic of Ireland) Marty Gallagher	(Republic of Ireland) Dean O'Sullivan	2
Peugeot	Peugeot 208 R2	(Republic of Ireland) Mc Connell Motorsport	(Republic of Ireland) Marty Gallagher	(Republic of Ireland) Dean O'Sullivan	5–7
Opel	Opel Adam R2	(United Kingdom) Callum Devine Rallying	(United Kingdom) Callum Devine	(Republic of Ireland) Keith Moriarty	2, 6

Junior BRC Entries

Constructor	Car	Team	Driver	Co Driver	Rounds
Vauxhall	Vauxhall Adam R2	(United Kingdom) Vauxhall Motorsport Junior Rally Team	(Sweden) Matthias Adielsson	(Sweden) Andreas Johansson	All
Vauxhall	Vauxhall Adam R2	(United Kingdom) Vauxhall Motorsport Junior Rally Team	(Republic of Ireland) Robert Duggan	(Republic of Ireland) Gerard Conway	All
Vauxhall	Vauxhall Adam R2	(United Kingdom) Vauxhall Motorsport Junior Rally Team	(Australia) Aaron Windus	(Australia) Rhianon Smyth	1–3
Renault	Renault Twingo RS R2	(Norway) Sindre Furuseth Rally	(Norway) Sindre Furuseth	(Norway) Gøril Undebakke	1
Renault	Renault Twingo RS R2	(Norway) Sindre Furuseth Rally	(Norway) Sindre Furuseth	(Norway) Roger Eilertson	3
Renault	Renault Twingo RS R2	(Norway) Sindre Furuseth Rally	(Norway) Sindre Furuseth	(Sweden) Jim Hjerpe	4–7
Ford	Ford Fiesta R2T	(United Kingdom) Gus Greensmith Rallying	(United Kingdom) Gus Greensmith	(Italy) Alex Gelsomino	1, 3, 5
Ford	Ford Fiesta R2T	(United Kingdom) Melvyn Evans Motorsport	(United Kingdom) Meirion Evans	(United Kingdom) Jonathan Jackson	1–5
Ford	Ford Fiesta R2T	(Belgium) Ice Pol Racing Team	(Belgium) Guillaume de Mevius	(Belgium) Louis Louka	1
Ford	Ford Fiesta R2T	(United Kingdom) Top Gear Motors	(United Kingdom) Adam Bustard	(United Kingdom) Aaron Johnston	All
Ford	Ford Fiesta R2T	(United Kingdom) MH Motorsport	(Italy) Umberto Accornero	(United Kingdom) Andrew Edwards	1–3
Ford	Ford Fiesta R2T	(United Kingdom) MH Motorsport	(Italy) Umberto Accornero	(Italy) Nicola Arena	4
Ford	Ford Fiesta R2T	(United Kingdom) MH Motorsport	(United Kingdom) Josh Cornwell	(United Kingdom) Phil Hall	7
Ford	Ford Fiesta R2T	(United Kingdom) BBR Rallying	(United Kingdom) Blair Brown	(United Kingdom) Richard Simmonds	1–6
Ford	Ford Fiesta R2T	(United Kingdom) BBR Rallying	(United Kingdom) Blair Brown	(United Kingdom) Steven Clark	7
Ford	Ford Fiesta R2	(United Kingdom) Two 4 Motorsport	(Australia) Rhys Pinter	(United Kingdom) Mark Swallow	1
Ford	Ford Fiesta R2	(United Kingdom) Two 4 Motorsport	(Australia) Rhys Pinter	(United Kingdom) Phil Hall	3
Ford	Ford Fiesta R2	(United Kingdom) MH Motorsport	(United Kingdom) Josh Cornwell	(United Kingdom) Dai Roberts	1–5
Ford	Ford Fiesta R2	(United Kingdom) MH Motorsport	(United Kingdom) Nick Carr	(United Kingdom) Joe Sturdy	1, 3–5
Ford	Ford Fiesta R2	(United Kingdom) MH Motorsport	(United Kingdom) Will Graham	(United States) Alex Kihurani	1
Ford	Ford Fiesta R2	(United Kingdom) MH Motorsport	(United Kingdom) Will Graham	(United Kingdom) Tim Sayer	2, 5–6
Ford	Ford Fiesta R2	(United Kingdom) MH Motorsport	(United Kingdom) Nabila Tejpar	(United Kingdom) Fiona Scarrett	1–2
Ford	Ford Fiesta R2	(United Kingdom) MH Motorsport	(United Kingdom) Nabila Tejpar	(United Kingdom) Tim Sayer	3
Ford	Ford Fiesta R2	(United Kingdom) MH Motorsport	(United Kingdom) Nabila Tejpar	(United Kingdom) Alister Crook	4
Ford	Ford Fiesta R2	(United Kingdom) MH Motorsport	(United Kingdom) Nabila Tejpar	(United Kingdom) Andrew Edwards	6–7
Ford	Ford Fiesta R2	(United Kingdom) Major Motorsport	(Australia) Guy Tyler	(Australia) Steven Fisher	1, 3–5

BRC5 Entries

Constructor	Car	Team	Driver	Co Driver	Rounds
Ford	Ford Fiesta R1	(United Kingdom) Major Motorsport	(United Kingdom) Tom Williams	(United Kingdom) Emma Morrison	3

== Event results ==
Podium places and information on each event.

Round	Rally name	Podium finishers				Statistics			
Round	Rally name	Rank	Driver	Car	Time	Stages	Length	Starters	Finishers
1	Mid Wales Stages (5-6 March)	1	(United Kingdom) Elfyn Evans	Ford Fiesta R5	1:08:14.3	6	114.26 km	45	31
1	Mid Wales Stages (5-6 March)	2	(Sweden) Fredrik Åhlin	Ford Fiesta R5	1:08:31.4	6	114.26 km	45	31
1	Mid Wales Stages (5-6 March)	3	(United Kingdom) Tom Cave	Ford Fiesta R5	1:09:41.1	6	114.26 km	45	31
2	Circuit of Ireland (8-9 April)	1	(Republic of Ireland) Josh Moffett	Ford Fiesta R5	1:55:56.2	14	209.56 km	70	44
2	Circuit of Ireland (8-9 April)	2	(United Kingdom) Jonathan Greer	Citroën DS3 R5	1:56:23.1	14	209.56 km	70	44
2	Circuit of Ireland (8-9 April)	3	(United Kingdom) David Bogie	Škoda Fabia R5	1:57:11.7	14	209.56 km	70	44
3	Pirelli Rally (30 April-1 May)	1	(Sweden) Fredrik Åhlin	Ford Fiesta R5	1:05:15.6	7	118.77 km	57	41
3	Pirelli Rally (30 April-1 May)	2	(United Kingdom) Matthew Wilson	Ford Fiesta R5	1:05:43.2	7	118.77 km	57	41
3	Pirelli Rally (30 April-1 May)	3	(United Kingdom) Elfyn Evans	Ford Fiesta R5	1:05:46.7	7	118.77 km	57	41
4	RSAC Scottish Rally (25 June)	1	(United Kingdom) Elfyn Evans	Ford Fiesta R5	51:02.4	8	99.88 km	117	81
4	RSAC Scottish Rally (25 June)	2	(United Kingdom) Tom Cave	Ford Fiesta R5	51:54.8	8	99.88 km	117	81
4	RSAC Scottish Rally (25 June)	3	(United Kingdom) Desi Henry	Škoda Fabia R5	53:16.8	8	99.88 km	117	81
5	Nicky Grist Stages (9-10 July)	1	(United Kingdom) Elfyn Evans	Ford Fiesta R5	1:18:48.4	18	172.34 km	41	33
5	Nicky Grist Stages (9-10 July)	2	(United Kingdom) Tom Cave	Ford Fiesta R5	1:19:59.8	18	172.34 km	41	33
5	Nicky Grist Stages (9-10 July)	3	(United Kingdom) Desi Henry	Škoda Fabia R5	1:21:20.2	18	172.34 km	41	33
6	Ulster Rally (19-20 August)	1	(United Kingdom) Elfyn Evans	Ford Fiesta R5	2:11:15.4	14	215.44 km	41	31
6	Ulster Rally (19-20 August)	2	(United Kingdom) Jonathan Greer	Citroën DS3 R5	2:12:40.8	14	215.44 km	41	31
6	Ulster Rally (19-20 August)	3	(United Kingdom) David Bogie	Škoda Fabia R5	2:13:15.8	14	215.44 km	41	31
7	Rally Isle of Man (15-17 September)	1	(United Kingdom) Elfyn Evans	Ford Fiesta R5	2:06:14.3	20	270.37 km	28	21
7	Rally Isle of Man (15-17 September)	2	(United Kingdom) Tom Cave	Ford Fiesta R5	2:07:36.6	20	270.37 km	28	21
7	Rally Isle of Man (15-17 September)	3	(United Kingdom) Desi Henry	Škoda Fabia R5	2:07:48.2	20	270.37 km	28	21

== Drivers championship standings ==
Top 10 positions

Pos	Driver	MWS	IRL	PIR	SCO	NGS	ULS	MAN	Pts
1	(United Kingdom) Elfyn Evans	1*	Ret	3	1	1	1	1	185
2	(United Kingdom) Tom Cave	3	4	4	2*	2	8	2	101
3	(United Kingdom) Jonathan Greer	8	2	6	4	6	2*	5	78
4	(Sweden) Fredrik Åhlin	2	Ret	1*	Ret	24	14	Ret	65
5	(Republic of Ireland) Josh Moffett	6	1	-	-	5	6	-	52
6	(United Kingdom) Desi Henry	10	Ret	7*	3	3	Ret	3	49
7	(United Kingdom) David Bogie	4	3	Ret	Ret*	4	3	6	46
8	(United Kingdom) Matt Edwards	7	14	13	7	12	9	4	26
9	(United Kingdom) Martin McCormack	Ret	Ret	5	-	-	6*	-	18
10	(United Kingdom) Rhys Yates	Ret	6	11	Ret	7*	7	Ret	17
Pos	Driver	MWS	IRL	PIR	SCO	NGS	ULS	MAN	Pts

Key
Colour	Result
Gold	Winner
Silver	2nd place
Bronze	3rd place
Green	Non-podium finish
Purple	Did not finish (Ret)
Black	Disqualified (DSQ)
Black	Excluded (EXC)
White	Did not start (DNS)
*	Joker played

Points will be awarded in each class as follows: 25, 15, 12, 10, 8, 6, 4, 2, 1. Competitors may nominate one event as their 'joker', on which they will score additional points. The final round of the championship was a double-header for points as the rally was split into two point scoring rounds. Competitors six best scores will count towards their championship total, including the final round.
