= Daniel McKenna =

Daniel McKenna can refer to:

- Daniel McKenna (general), Chief of Staff of Ireland's Defence Forces during the Second World War
- Daniel McKenna (rally driver), Irish rally driver
