= Timothy Cathcart =

Northern Ireland rally driver (1994–2024)

- Born: 7 July 1994; Enniskillen, County Fermanagh, Northern Ireland
- Died: 15 August 2014 (aged 20); Fivemiletown, County Tyrone, Northern Ireland
- Occupation: Rally driver
- Years active: 2013–2014

Timothy Cathcart (7 July 1994 – 15 August 2014) was a Northern Irish rally driver from Enniskillen who was killed at the Todds Leap Ulster Rally, a round of the 2014 British Rally Championship season, after his Citroën DS3 R3T vehicle left the road and crashed near Fivemiletown.

Cathcart's co-driver Dai Roberts was injured and airlifted to a Belfast hospital but made a full recovery. Dai's brother Gareth Roberts, also a co-driver, died in a similar accident at the Targa Florio in June 2012.
