= Daniel McKenna (rally driver) =

Irish rally driver (born 1987)

Personal information
- Nationality: (Republic of Ireland) Irish
- Born: April 3, 1987 (age 39); County Monaghan, Ireland

World Rally Championship record
- Years active: 2013–2015
- Rallies: 5
- Championships: 0
- Rally wins: 0
- Podiums: 0
- Stage wins: 0
- Total points: 0
- First rally: 2013 Rally GB
- Last rally: 2015 Rally Finland

Daniel McKenna (born 3 April 1987) is a rally driver from County Monaghan, Ireland.

In 2014, he became only the third Irishman to win the British Rally Championship and earned a WRC-3 and JWRC drive for 2015. In the 2014 British Rally Championship season, he drove a Citroën DS3 R3T, was co-driven by Arthur Kierans and he won four out of the six rallies to take the title.

He was a winner of the Billy Coleman Award as well.
