= DS 3 =

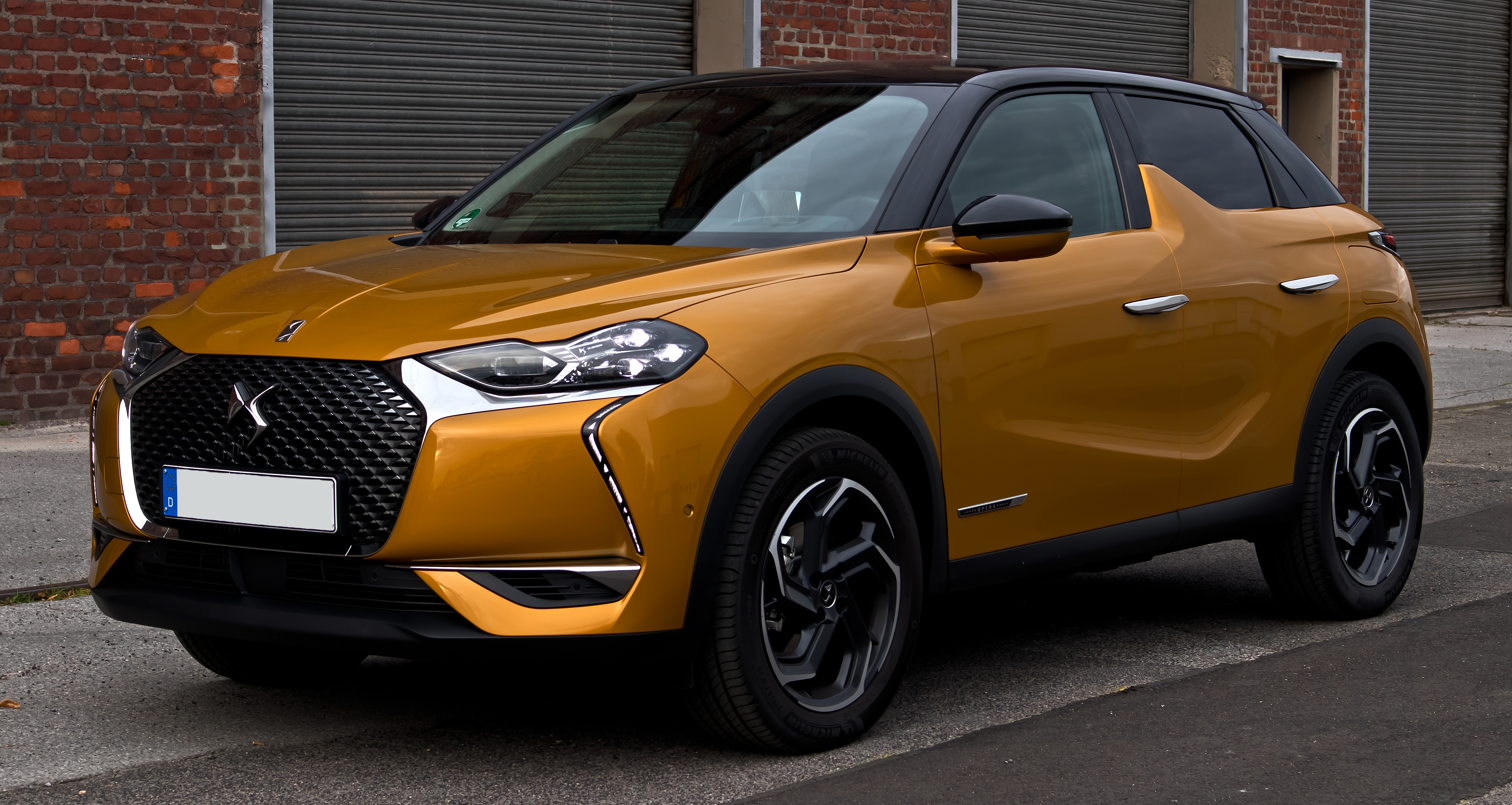
- DS 3 Crossback (pre-facelift)

Overview
- Manufacturer: Citroën (2009–2016); DS Automobiles (2016–present)
- Also called: Citroën DS3 (2009–2016); DS3 (2016–2019); DS 3 Crossback (2018–2022); DS 3 (2023–present)
- Production: 2009–present

Body and chassis
- Class: Supermini (B) (2009–2019); Subcompact luxury crossover SUV (B) (2018–present)
- Body style: 3-door hatchback (2009–2019); 3-door convertible (2012–2019); 5-door hatchback (2018–present)
- Layout: Front-engine, front-wheel-drive / all-wheel-drive

The DS 3 (formerly known as Citroën DS3 and DS 3 Crossback) is a luxury supermini initially produced by the French automobile manufacturer Citroën and officially launched in January 2010. Positioned below the DS 4, this was the first and entry-level model from the DS premium sub-brand (pronounced déesse, which is French for goddess), which was spun-off in 2016 into DS Automobiles.

Originally manufactured as a three-door supermini hatchback with a convertible variation from 2009 to 2019, the second generation became a five-door Crossover SUV, named as DS 3 Crossback from 2018 to 2022.The model was named the "2010 Car of the Year" by Top Gear, awarded first supermini four times in a row by the JD Power Satisfaction Survey UK and second most efficient supermini (Citroën DS3 1.6 e-HDi 115 Airdream: 63.0 mpg_{‑imp} (4.48 L/100 km)) by What Car? behind the Citroën C3. In 2013, it was again the most sold premium subcompact car with 40% of these market shares in Europe.

== First generation (2009) ==
First generation
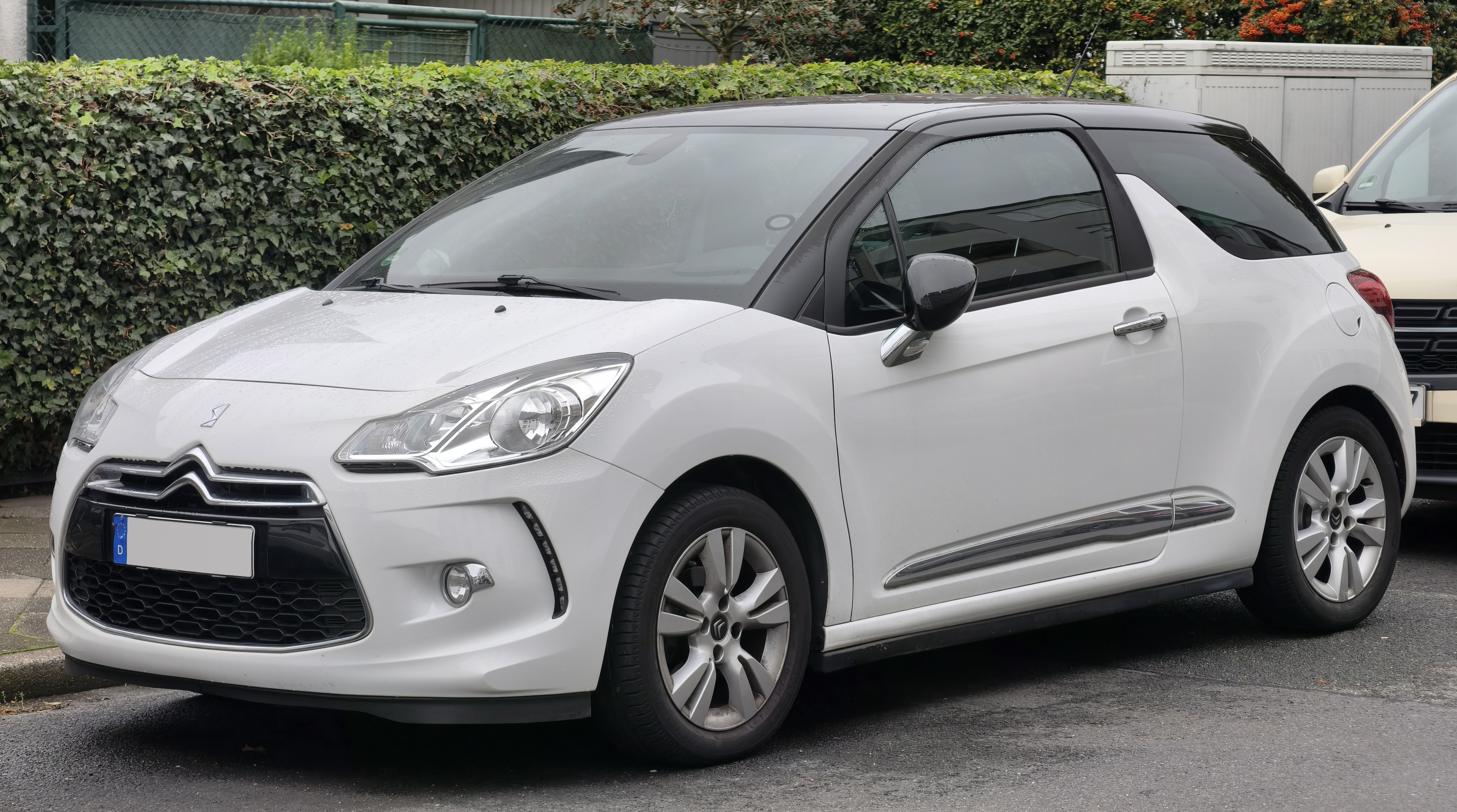
- DS 3 (pre-facelift)

Overview
- Manufacturer: Citroën (2009–2016); DS Automobiles (2016–2019)
- Also called: Citroën DS3 (2009–2016)
- Production: 2009–2019
- Assembly: France: Poissy (PSA Poissy Plant); Malaysia: Gurun (NAM)
- Designer: Frédéric Soubirou (exterior); Christophe Cayrol (interior)

Body and chassis
- Class: Supermini (B)
- Body style: 3-door hatchback 3-door convertible
- Layout: Front-engine, front-wheel-drive
- Platform: PSA PF1 platform
- Related: Citroën C3; Citroën C4 Cactus; Peugeot 208

Powertrain
- Engine: Petrol: 1.2 L EB2 I3; 1.2 L EB2DT turbo I3; 1.4 L EP3 I4; 1.6 L EP6 I4; 1.6 L EP6DT turbo I4; Diesel: 1.4 L DV4 turbo I4; 1.6 L DV6 turbo I4
- Transmission: 5-speed manual 6-speed manual 4-speed automatic 6-speed automatic

Dimensions
- Wheelbase: 2,464 mm (97.0 in)
- Length: 3,948 mm (155.4 in)
- Width: 1,715 mm (67.5 in)
- Height: 1,458 mm (57.4 in)
- Curb weight: 974–1,175 kg (2,147–2,590 lb)

Chronology
- Predecessor: Citroën C2

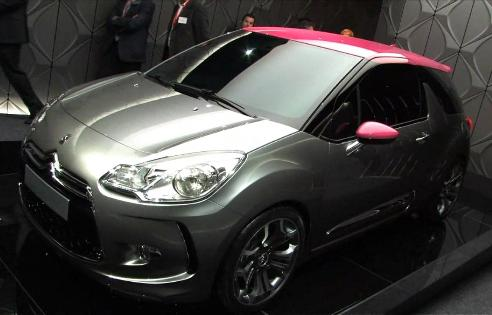
DS Inside Concept (2009)

The vehicle was initially intended to be sold as a three-door, second-generation Citroën C3. Advanced projects from 2007 show the vehicle sharing an identical front with the production second-generation C3 with no mention of the DS sub-brand. At this stage, the vehicle was named Citroën C3 Coupé. The original Citroën DS3 design was first introduced as a concept car named Citroën DS Inside, unveiled on 5 February 2009, at the Geneva Motor Show, introducing both the 2009 Citroën logo redesign and their DS sub-brand. The production model, called Citroën DS3, was introduced in August 2009, two months after the Citroën C3 II, with no emphasis that the two cars were having a lot in common.

Citroën revamped their DS3 line for the summer of 2011 with a new, limited-edition model, a new colour and a new decal on the roof. The new colour is Brun Hickory, a shade of dark brown that recently made its debut on the DS3's bigger sibling, the DS4. One of the DS3's strongest selling points is the ability for a customer to personalize their car when they order it by mixing and matching body and roof colours, decals, and so on. This new colour helps that by bringing the total amount of available body colours to ten.

The DS3 features prominently in the video for the Pixie Lott song "What Do You Take Me For". It is the first car that has had product placement in a British music video.

The DS3 range received a mild facelift in 2014, with revised engines and new design of Xenon-LED headlights for the top of the range models. The new BlueHDi diesel, available in two states of tune, has a low CO_{2} emissions level of 79g/km. It received a new facelift in 2016, completely dropping any reference to Citroën and its logo.

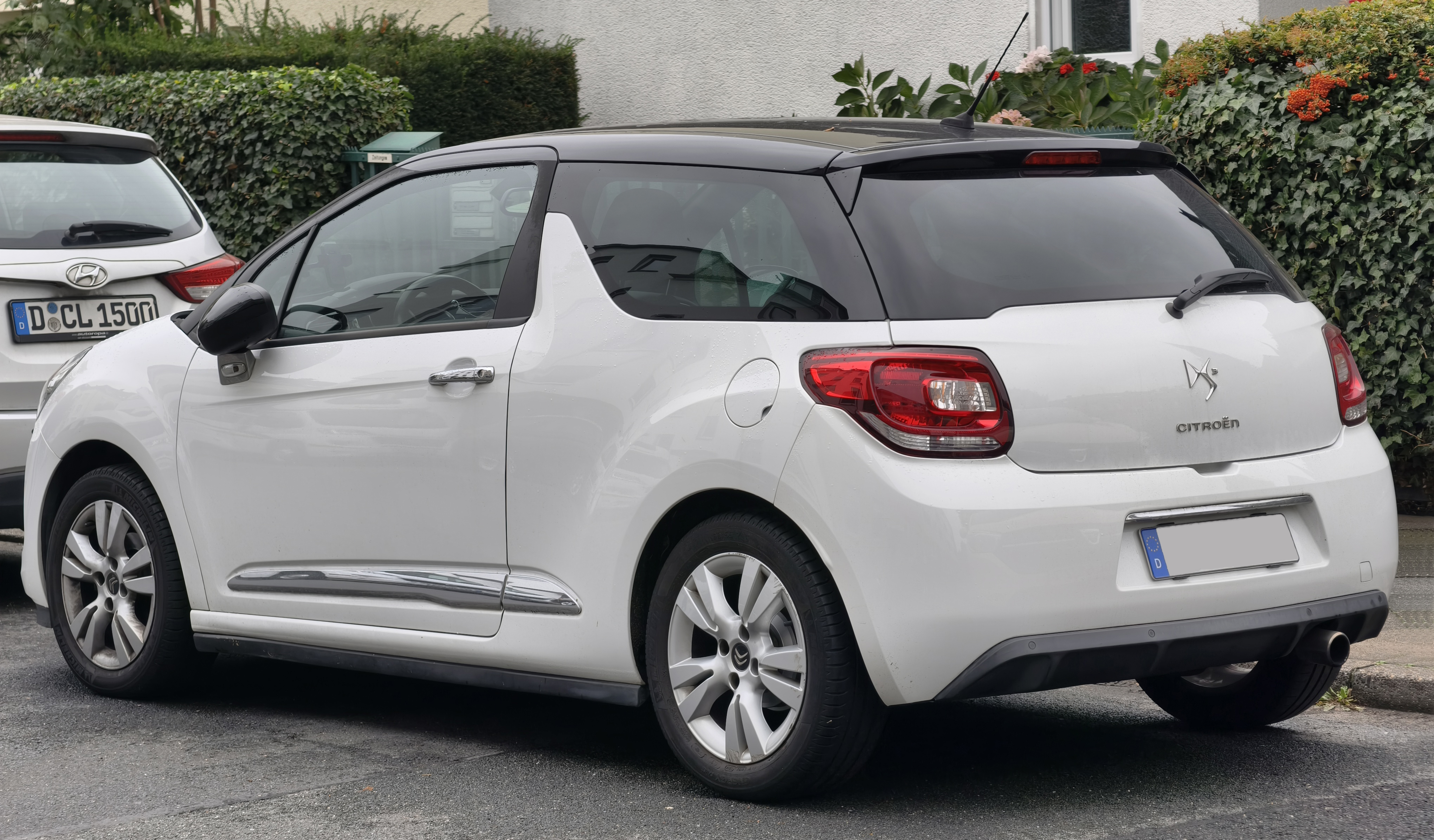
Citroen DS 3 (pre-facelift; rear view)

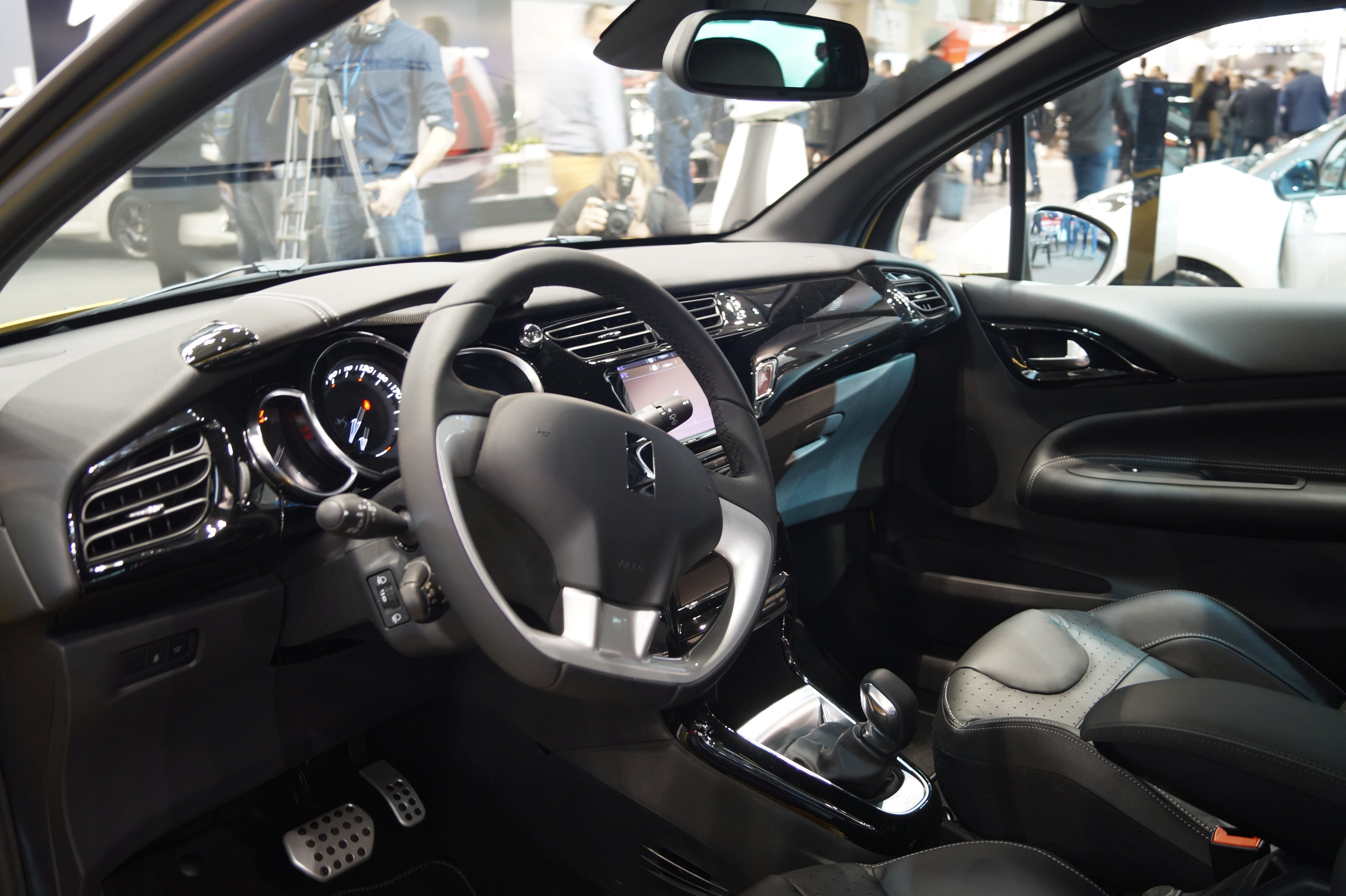
Interior

=== DS3 Racing ===
A 207 hp (154 kW) version, the DS3 Racing, was introduced at the 2010 Geneva Motor Show. It is the road version of Citroën's rally specification car DS3 R3. The new 0-62 mph time is 6.5 seconds and the increased top speed is 146 mph (235 km/h).

The DS3 Racing was offered in only two colours, white with grey accents or black with orange accents including roof, wheels and interior. Besides these unique colour schemes, the DS3 Racing is distinguished from other trim levels by the use of real carbon fibre on the front splitter, grille, wheel arches and rear diffuser. Additionally, carbon fibre is prominently featured on the interior.

In October 2011, Citroën announced that they were planning on building a total of 2,400 DS3 Racings, significantly more than the 1,000 initially planned in 2010.

The Citroën DS3 WRC was used by the Citroën World Rally Team in WRC competitions between 2011 and 2016.

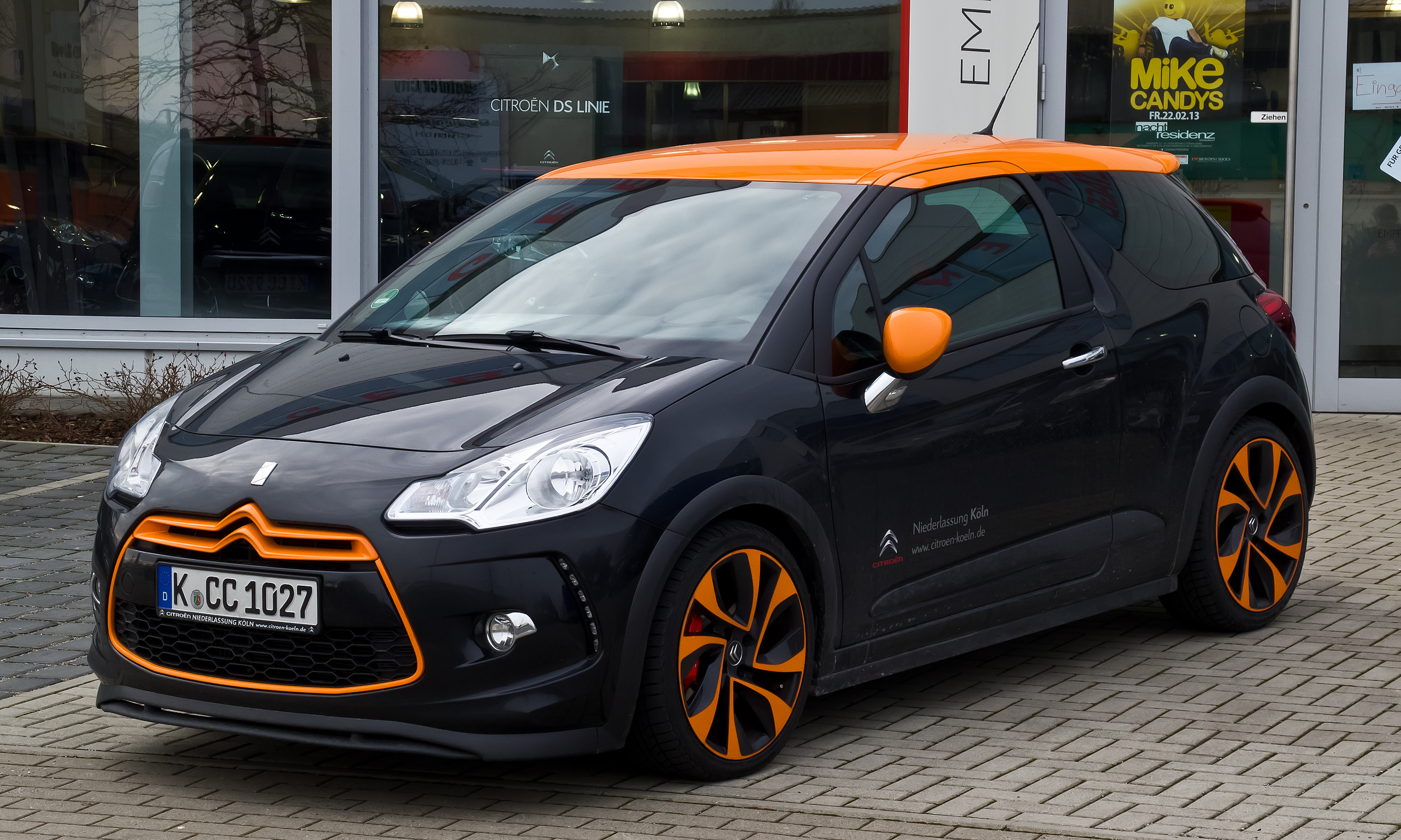
Citroën DS3 Racing (front view)

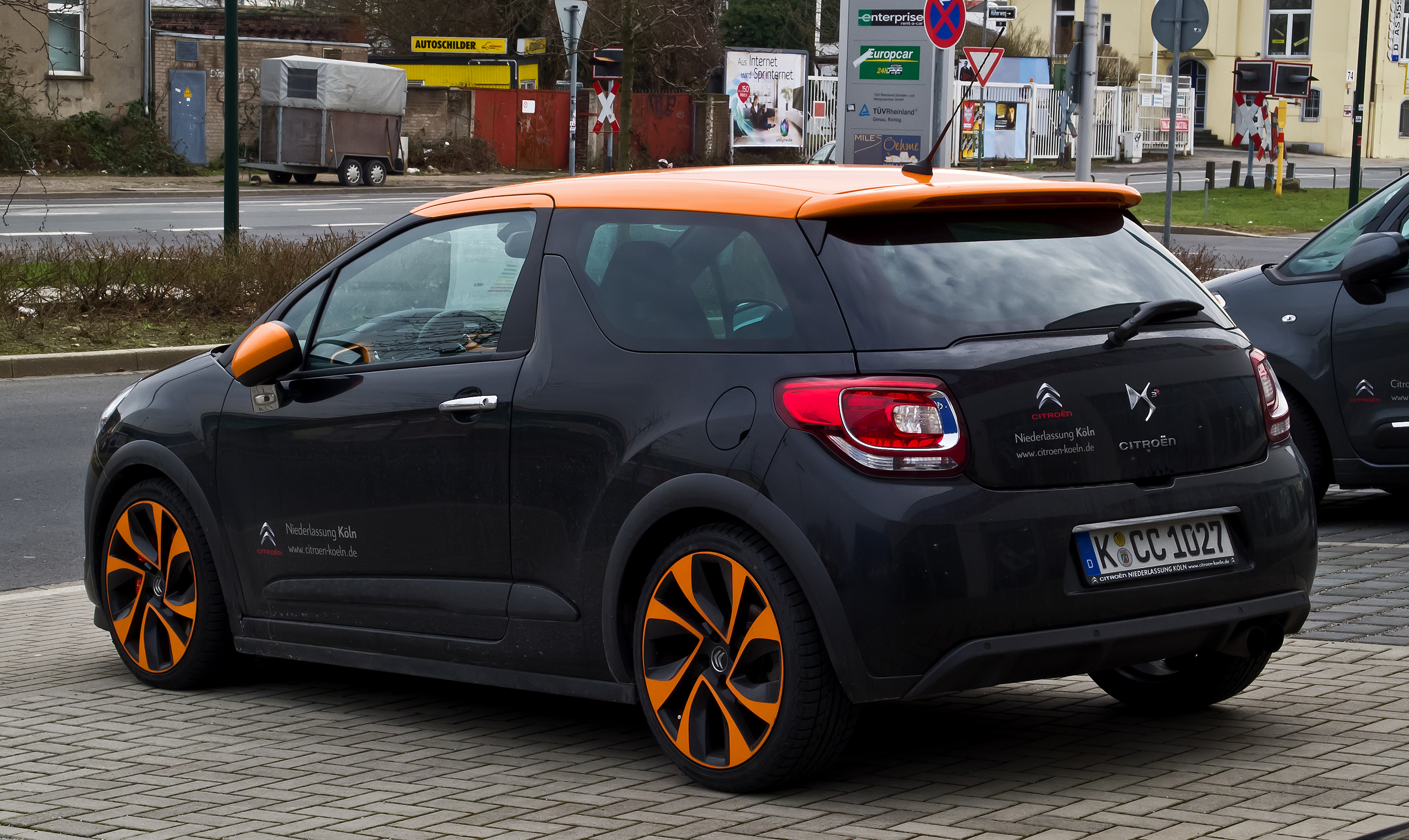
Citroën DS3 Racing (rear view)

=== DS3 Cabrio ===
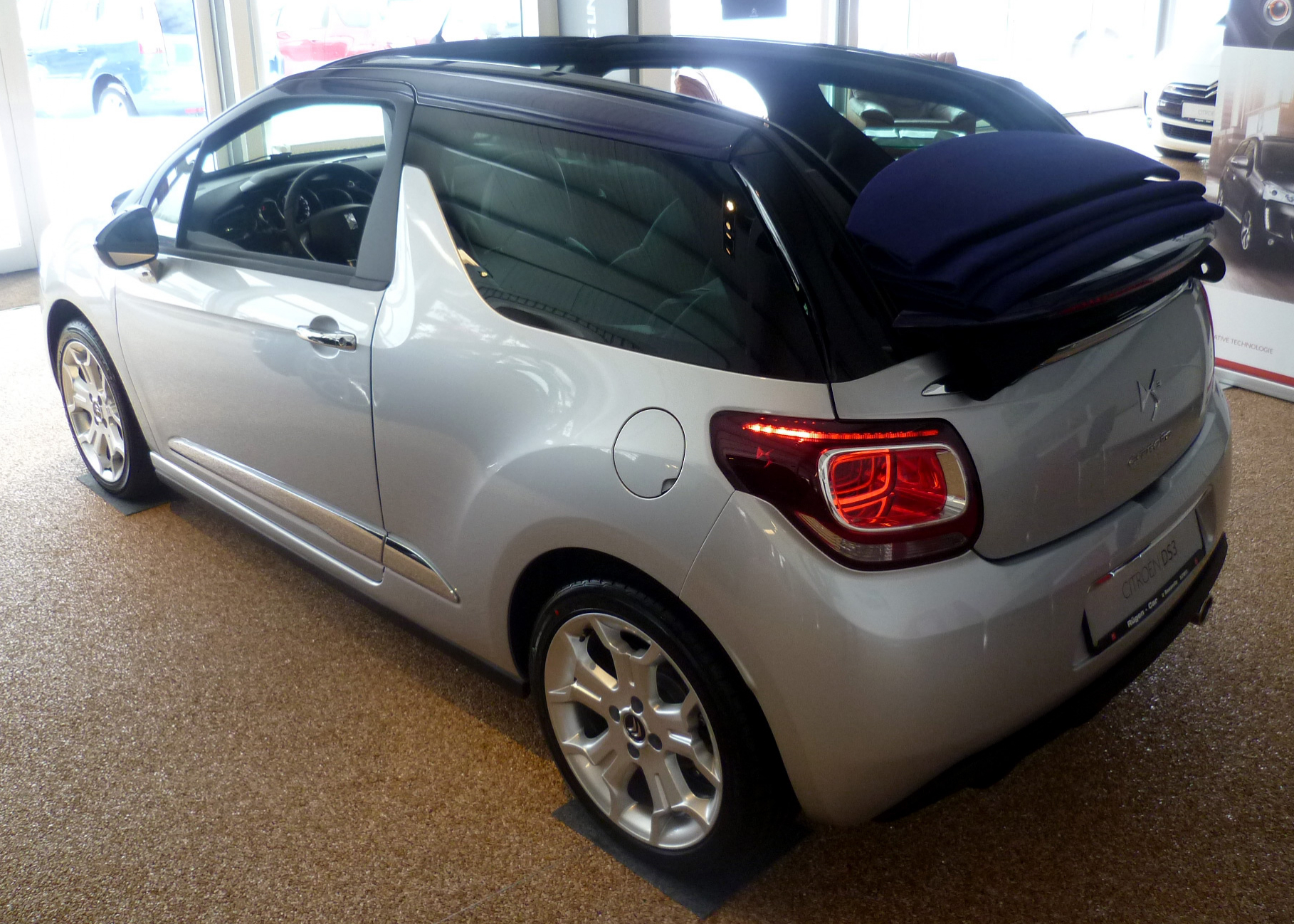
DS3 Cabrio (rear view)

Citroën unveiled the DS3 Cabrio at the Paris Motor Show in September 2012, with sales commencing in 2013.

As a fixed profile convertible, the DS 3 retains its side bodywork, allowing for a roll back center fabric sunroof – similar to other fixed profile convertibles including the Fiat 500 (2007), Nissan Figaro (1991), Citroën 2CV (1948–1990) and the Nash Rambler Convertible "Landau" Coupe (1950).

=== Matière Grise edition ===
Citroën announced the "Matière Grise" limited edition of 750 cars for the European market. It is finished in flat grey paint with chromed mirrors, chromed door trim and chromed tail light surrounds. The roof can be ordered in either white or black and the only available wheels are 17″ alloys, also available in white and black.

=== Facelift ===
In February 2016, the facelifted DS 3 was announced by DS Automobiles, as part of their separation from Citroën to become a standalone brand. The new DS 3 was launched at that year's Geneva Motor Show. The revised model no longer featured Citroën badges, with the DS badge now featuring prominently on the front grille. The trim level names were also changed from DSign, DStyle and DSport and re introduced as Chic, Elegance and Prestige. An Ultra Prestige model was also added.

The facelifted model is identified by a revised front and rear design, plus the new range of PSA engines incorporating the 1.2-litre three cylinder PureTech petrol engines (available in normally aspirated 82 bhp and turbocharged 110 and 130 bhp variants), the 1.6-litre THP turbocharged petrol engine with 165 bhp, and 1.6-litre BlueHDi turbo diesel engines with 100 and 120 bhp. In addition, a new DS 3 Performance model was introduced with the THP engine uprated to 210 bhp, with a 0–100 km/h time of 6.5 seconds.

In June 2016, DS partnered with French luxury fashion and perfume company Givenchy and launched the DS 3 Givenchy Le MakeUp special edition. A total of 500 Givenchy models were built and include unique features such as a textured matt white body with metallic purple roof and door mirrors, a rose pink dashboard strip and a make-up storage kit in the front central armrest. It is available with the PureTech 110 engine in manual or automatic transmission, and is based on the mid range Elegance trim level.

The DS Performance Line was launched in September 2016, enabling DS customers to have performance styling without any mechanical upgrades. DS 3 Performance Line includes aesthetics such as gloss black alloy wheels, black contrasting roof colour, exterior stripe graphics and interior coloured stitching.

In May 2018, DS Automobiles launched the DS 3 Café Racer limited edition, produced in 1,200 units. The vehicle's graphic identity, including the custom exterior decals and interior design elements, was created by Bruno Michaud of the BMD Design studio. The model featured a "Parthenon Cream" roof with vintage-style graphics, specific badging on the bonnet and doors, and a customized dashboard strip.

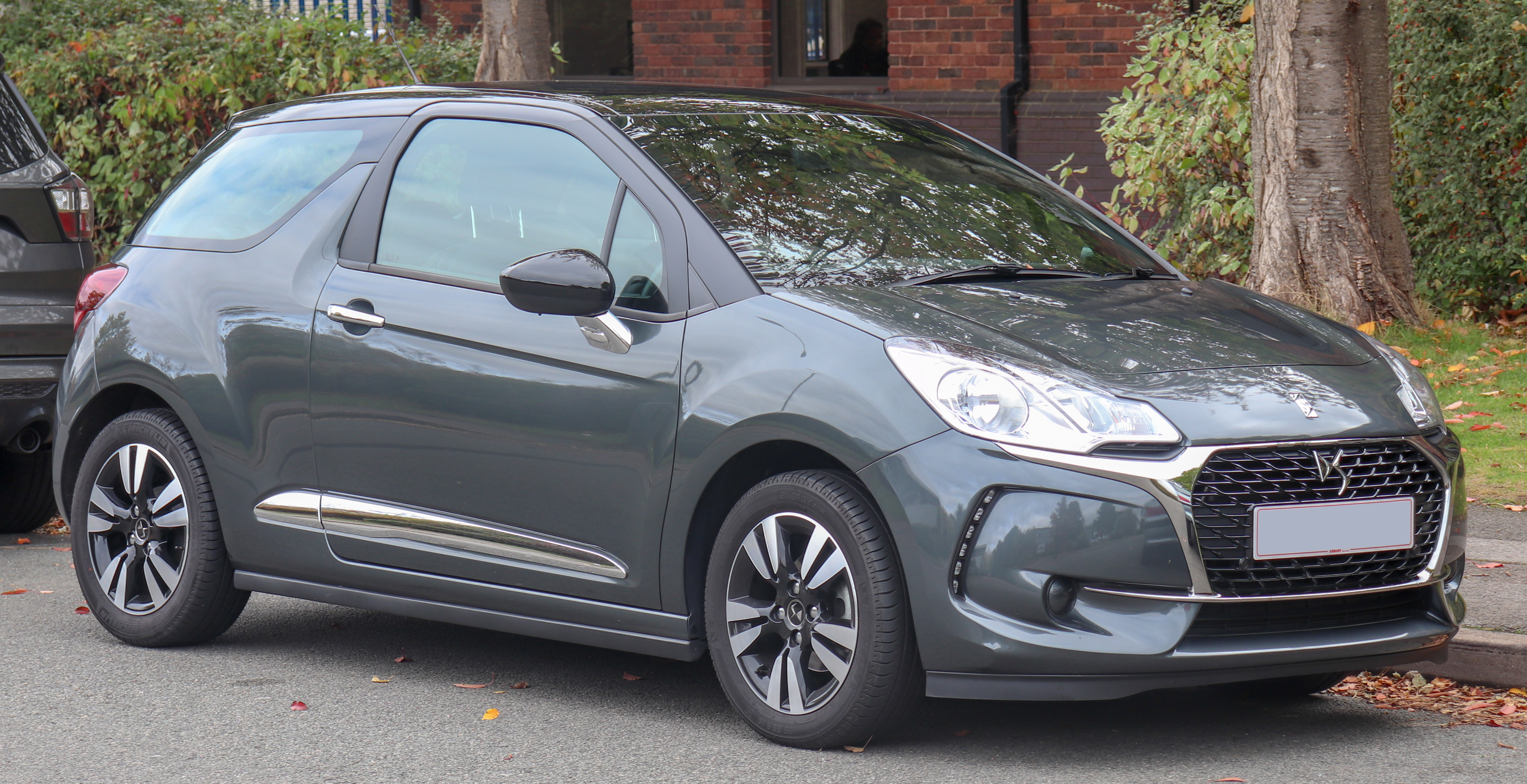
Front view

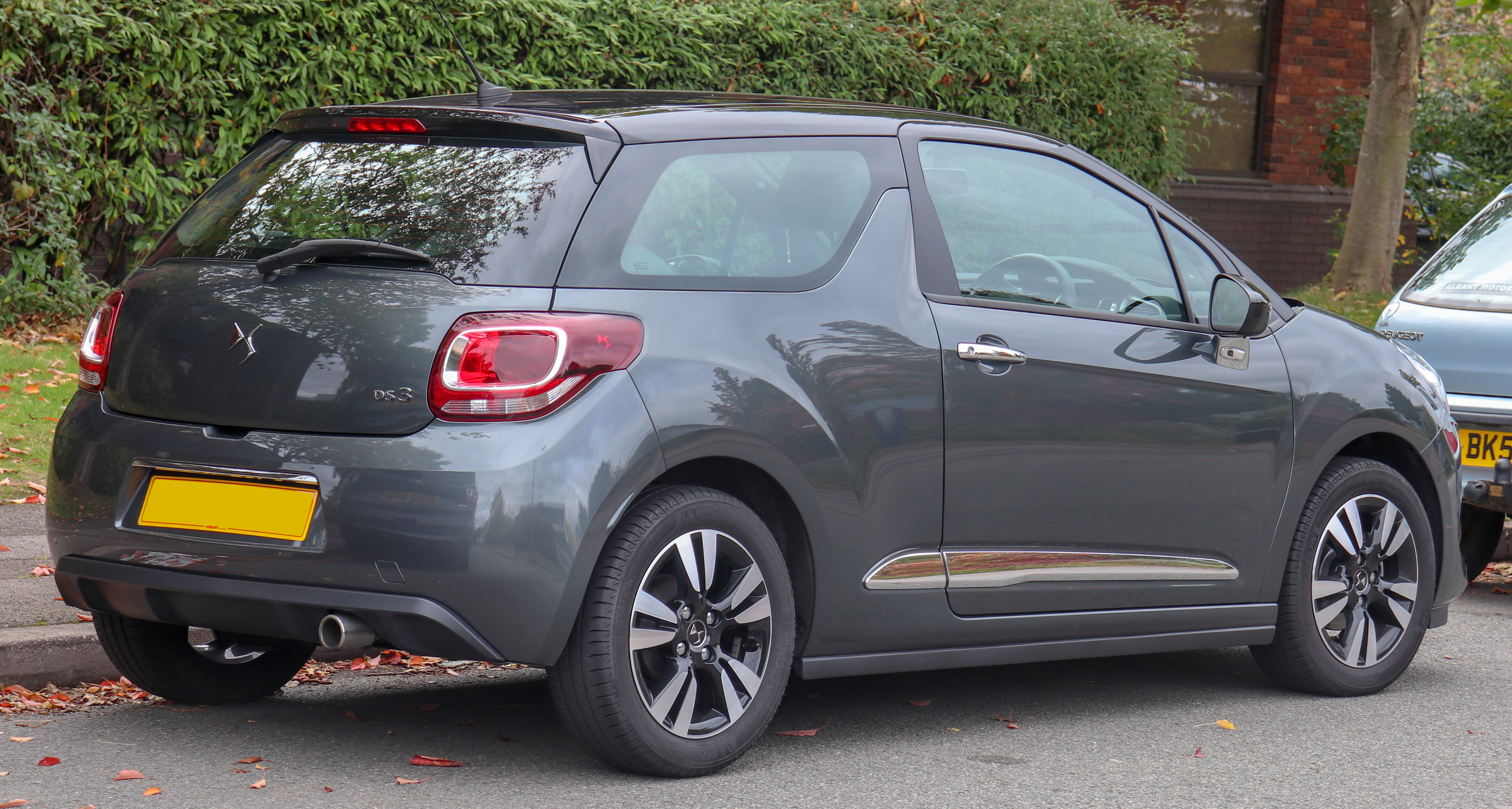
Rear view

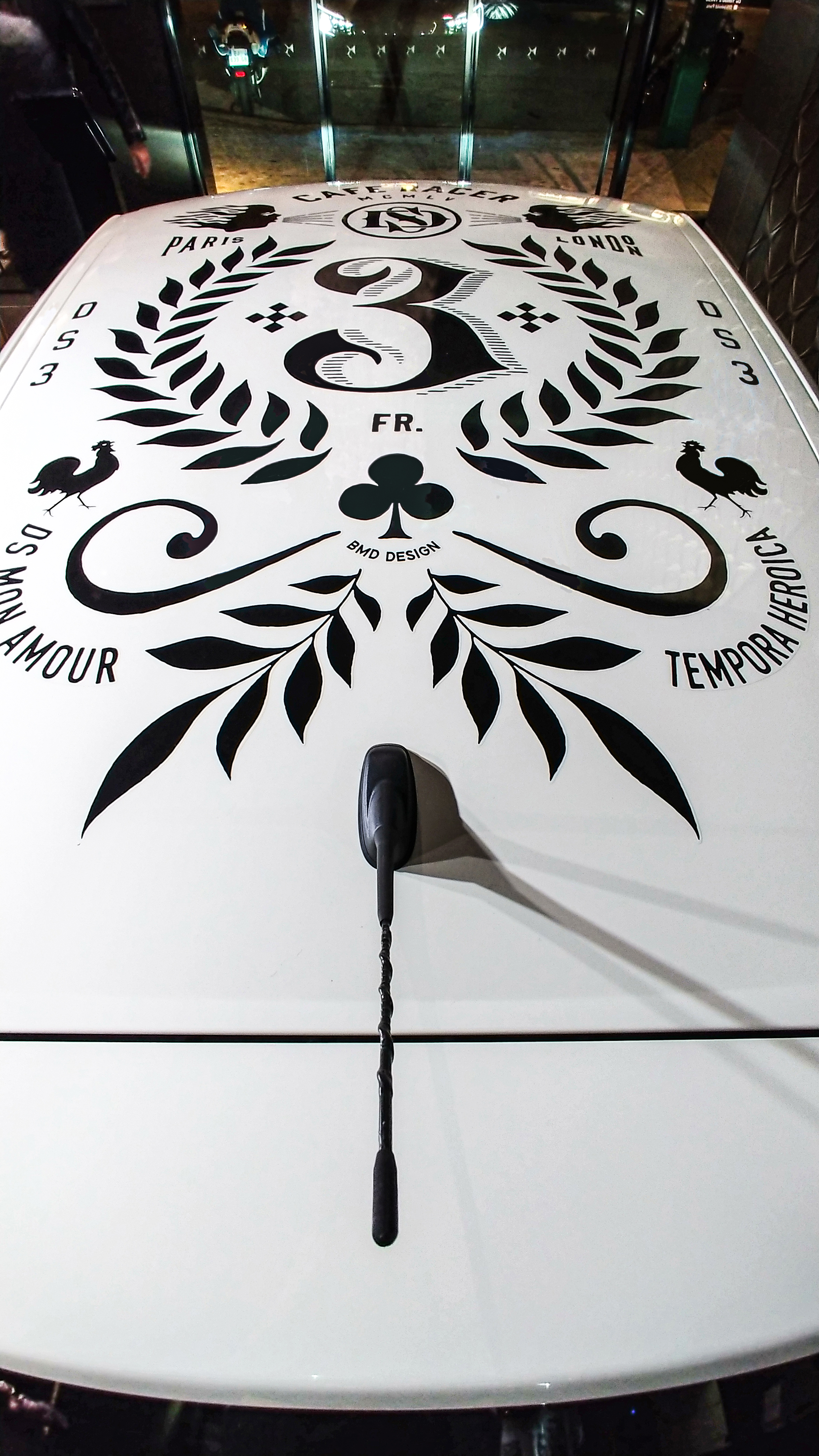
Graphic motif on the roof, the distinctive feature of the Café Racer edition.

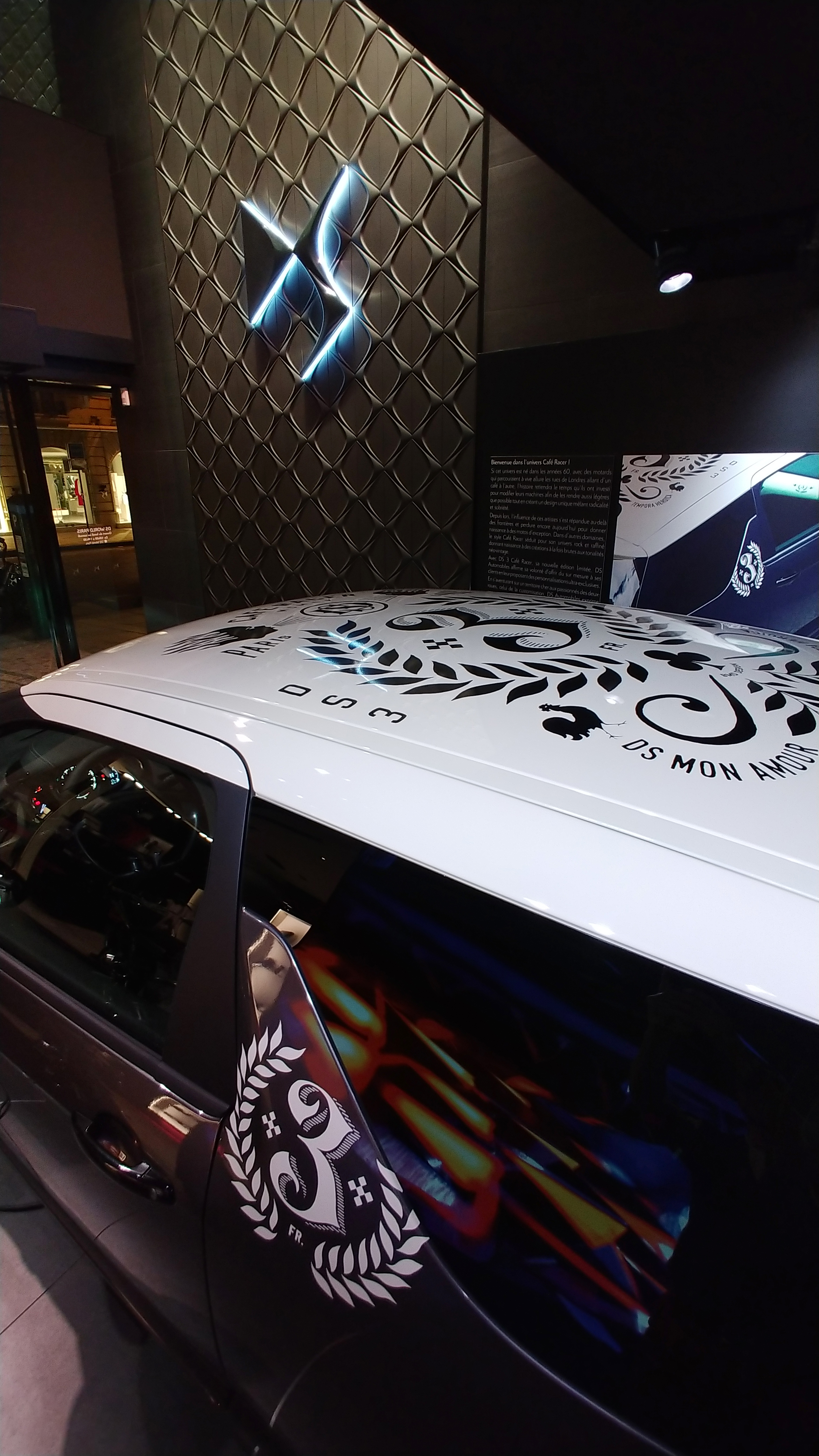
Roof graphics presented during the official launch of the limited edition in Paris, 2018.

=== Specifications ===
Petrol engines
Model	Year	Engine	Power	Torque	0–100 km/h (0–62 mph)	Top speed	Transmission	CO_{2} emission (g/km)
VTi 82	2012–2019	1199 cc I3	82 PS (60 kW; 81 hp) at 5,750 rpm	118 N⋅m (87 lbf⋅ft) at 2,750 rpm	14.2 s	174 km/h (108 mph)	5-speed manual	104
VTi 95	2009–2012	1397 cc I4	95 PS (70 kW; 94 hp) at 6,000 rpm	135 N⋅m (100 lbf⋅ft) at 4,000 rpm	10.6 s	183 km/h (114 mph)	5-speed manual	134-136
PureTech 110	2015–2019	1199 cc I3	110 PS (81 kW; 108 hp) at 5,500 rpm	205 N⋅m (151 lbf⋅ft) at 1,500 rpm	9.6 s	190 km/h (118 mph)	5-speed manual	104
PureTech 110	2015–2019	1199 cc I3	110 PS (81 kW; 108 hp) at 5,500 rpm	205 N⋅m (151 lbf⋅ft) at 1,500 rpm	9.9 s	188 km/h (117 mph)	6-speed automatic	108
PureTech 130	2016–2019	1199 cc I3	130 PS (96 kW; 128 hp) at 5,500 rpm	230 N⋅m (170 lbf⋅ft) at 1,750 rpm	8.9 s	204 km/h (127 mph)	6-speed manual	105
VTi 120	2009–2015	1598 cc I4	120 PS (88 kW; 118 hp) at 6,000 rpm	160 N⋅m (118 lb⋅ft) at 4,200 rpm	8.9 s	190 km/h (118 mph)	5-speed manual	136-138
VTi 120	2009–2015	1598 cc I4	120 PS (88 kW; 118 hp) at 6,000 rpm	160 N⋅m (118 lb⋅ft) at 4,200 rpm	10.9 s	190 km/h (118 mph)	4-speed automatic	153-155
THP 150	Unknown	1598 cc turbo I4	156 PS (115 kW; 154 hp) at 6,000 rpm	240 N⋅m (177 lb⋅ft) at 1,400-4,000 rpm	7.3 s	214 km/h (133 mph)	6-speed manual	155
THP 155	2010–2019	1598 cc turbo I4	156 PS (115 kW; 154 hp) at 6,000 rpm	240 N⋅m (177 lb⋅ft) at 1,400-4,000 rpm	7.3 s	214 km/h (133 mph)	6-speed manual	139
THP 207	2010–2015	1598 cc turbo I4	207 PS (152 kW; 204 hp) at 6,000 rpm	275 N⋅m (203 lb⋅ft) at 2,000 rpm	6.5 s	235 km/h (146 mph)	6-speed manual	149
THP 210	2016–2019	1598 cc turbo I4	210 PS (154 kW; 207 hp) at 6,000 rpm	300 N⋅m (221 lb⋅ft) at 3,000 rpm	6.5 s	230 km/h (143 mph)	6-speed manual	125

Diesel engines
Model	Year	Engine	Power	Torque	0–100 km/h (0–62 mph)	Top speed	Transmission	CO_{2} emission (g/km)
HDi 90 FAP	2009–2019	1560 cc turbo I4	90 PS (66 kW; 89 hp) at 3,750 rpm	230 N⋅m (170 lb⋅ft) at 2,000 rpm	11.3 s/11.5 s	180 km/h (112 mph)	5-speed manual	104/99
HDi 110 FAP	2009–2019	1560 cc turbo I4	110 PS (81 kW; 108 hp) at 4,000 rpm	270 N⋅m (199 lb⋅ft) at 2,000 rpm	9.8 s	118 mph (190 km/h)	6-speed manual	115
e-HDi 90 Airdream manual 95g	2010?–2019	1560 cc turbo I4	91 PS (67 kW; 90 hp) at 4,000 rpm	230 N⋅m (170 lb⋅ft) at 1,750 rpm	12.5 s	182 km/h (113 mph)	5-speed manual	95
e-HDi 90 Airdream manual 99g	2010–2019	1560 cc turbo I4	91 PS (67 kW; 90 hp) at 4,000 rpm	230 N⋅m (170 lb⋅ft) at 1,750 rpm	12.5 s	182 km/h (113 mph)	5-speed manual	98
e-HDi 110 Airdream	2011–2019	1560 cc turbo I4	112 PS (82 kW; 110 hp) at 3,600 rpm	270 N⋅m (199 lb⋅ft) at 1,750 rpm	9.7 s	190 km/h (118 mph)	6-speed manual	99
BlueHDi 120	2014–2019	1560 cc turbo I4	120 PS (88 kW; 118 hp) at 3,600 rpm	285 N⋅m (210 lb⋅ft) at 1,750 rpm	9.3 s	190 km/h (118 mph)	6-speed manual	94

==== Safety ====
ANCAP test results* Citroen DS3 all petrol 3 door hatches (2011)
Test	Score
Overall	5 /5 stars
Frontal offset	15.14/16
Side impact	16/16
Pole	2/2
Seat belt reminders	2/3
Whiplash protection	Adequate
Pedestrian protection	Marginal
Electronic stability control	Standard

Euro NCAP test results* LHD supermini (2009)
Test	Points	%
Overall:	5 /5 stars	
Adult occupant:	31.4	87%
Child occupant:	35.0	71%
Pedestrian:	12.6	35%
Safety assist:	5.8	83%

Euro NCAP test results* LHD supermini (2017)
Test	Points	%
Overall:	3 /5 stars	
Adult occupant:	26.3	69%
Child occupant:	18.6	37%
Pedestrian:	23.5	55%
Safety assist:	3.5	29%

=== Sales and production ===
Year	Worldwide Production	Worldwide sales	Difference
2009	1,700	500	
2010	68,400	64,500	
2011	77,169	78,375	+21,5%
2012	68,800	68,248	-13,0%
2013	68,200	69,014	+1,0%
2014		57,042	-17,3%
2015		48,698	-14,6%
2016		40,653	-16,5%
2017		28,971	-28,7%
2018		16,187	-44,1%
2019		5,049	-68,8%

== Second generation (D34) (2018) ==
Second generation
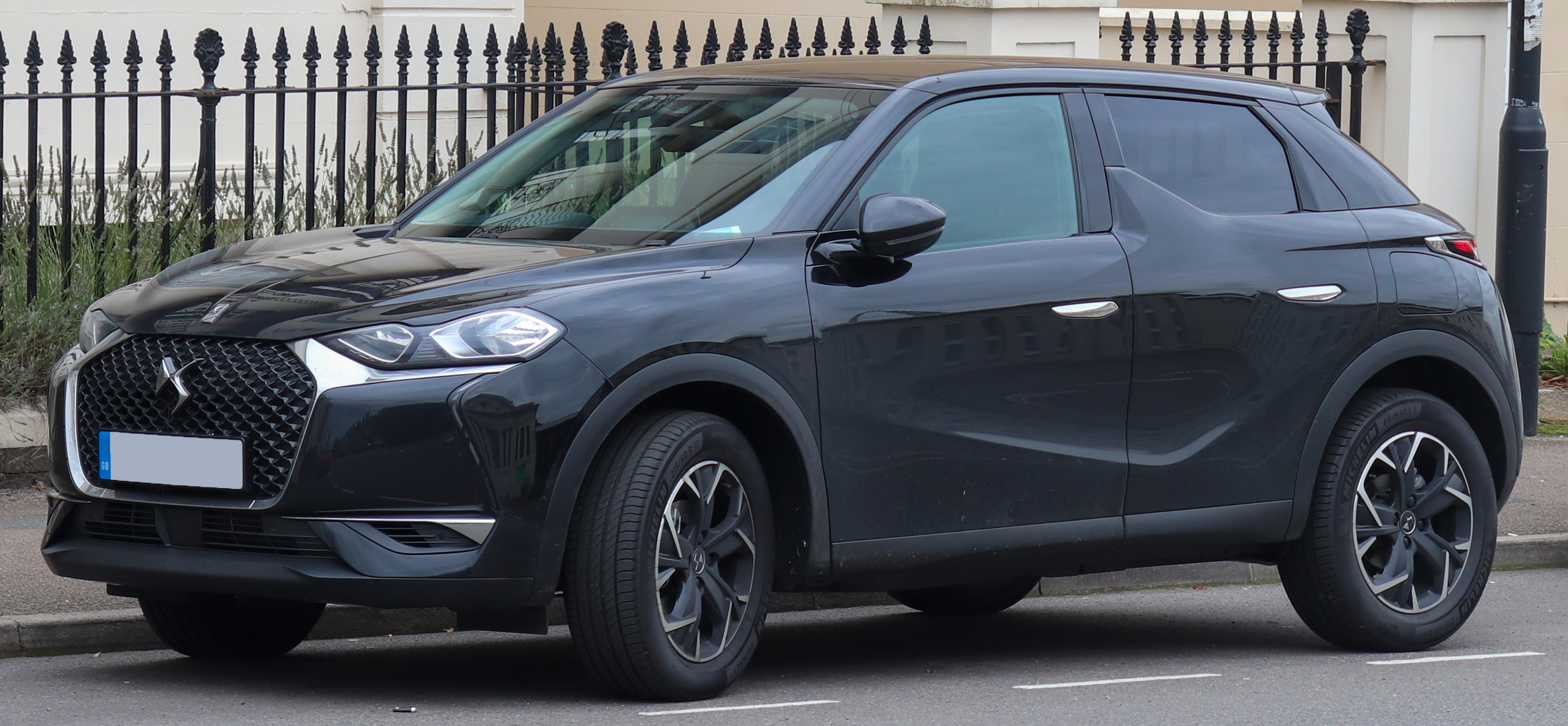
- DS 3 Crossback

Overview
- Manufacturer: DS Automobiles (Note: PSA Group (2018–2021) Stellantis (2021–present))
- Also called: DS 3 (China, 2021–2023; global, 2022–present); DS 3 Crossback (2018–2022)
- Production: 2018–present
- Assembly: France: Poissy (Poissy Plant)
- Designer: Nicolas Beauchamp

Body and chassis
- Class: Subcompact luxury crossover SUV
- Body style: 5-door SUV
- Layout: Front-engine, front-wheel-drive
- Platform: PSA EMP1 platform
- Related: Opel Corsa F Peugeot 208 II; Opel Mokka B Peugeot 2008 II; Citroën C4 III; IKCO Reera

Powertrain
- Engine: Petrol: 1.2 L EB2ADTD/EB2DTS/EB2ADTX turbo I3; Diesel: 1.5 L DV5 BlueHDi I4
- Electric motor: Permanent Magnet Synchronous Motor (E-Tense)
- Transmission: 6-speed manual (ICE); 8-speed automatic (ICE)
- Battery: 50 kWh
- Electric range: 332 km (206 mi)

Dimensions
- Wheelbase: 2,560 mm (100.8 in)
- Length: 4,120 mm (162.2 in)
- Width: 1,790 mm (70.5 in)
- Height: 1,550 mm (61.0 in)
- Curb weight: 1,245–1,625 kg (2,745–3,583 lb)

The second generation of DS 3 was presented for the first time on 13 September 2018, with public premiere is at the 88th Paris Motor Show in October 2018. Although keeping some key design elements from the previous generation - such as the floating roof and the partial B-pillar - its body style became a 5-door crossover SUV and the model changed its name to DS 3 Crossback. The SUV is the first DS vehicle based on the PSA EMP1 platform shared with the Peugeot 208. Powertrains include a range of petrol and diesel engines and an electric version.

A fully electric version, known as "E-Tense", is also sold. In January 2020, monthly sales of the electric version were over 700 units.

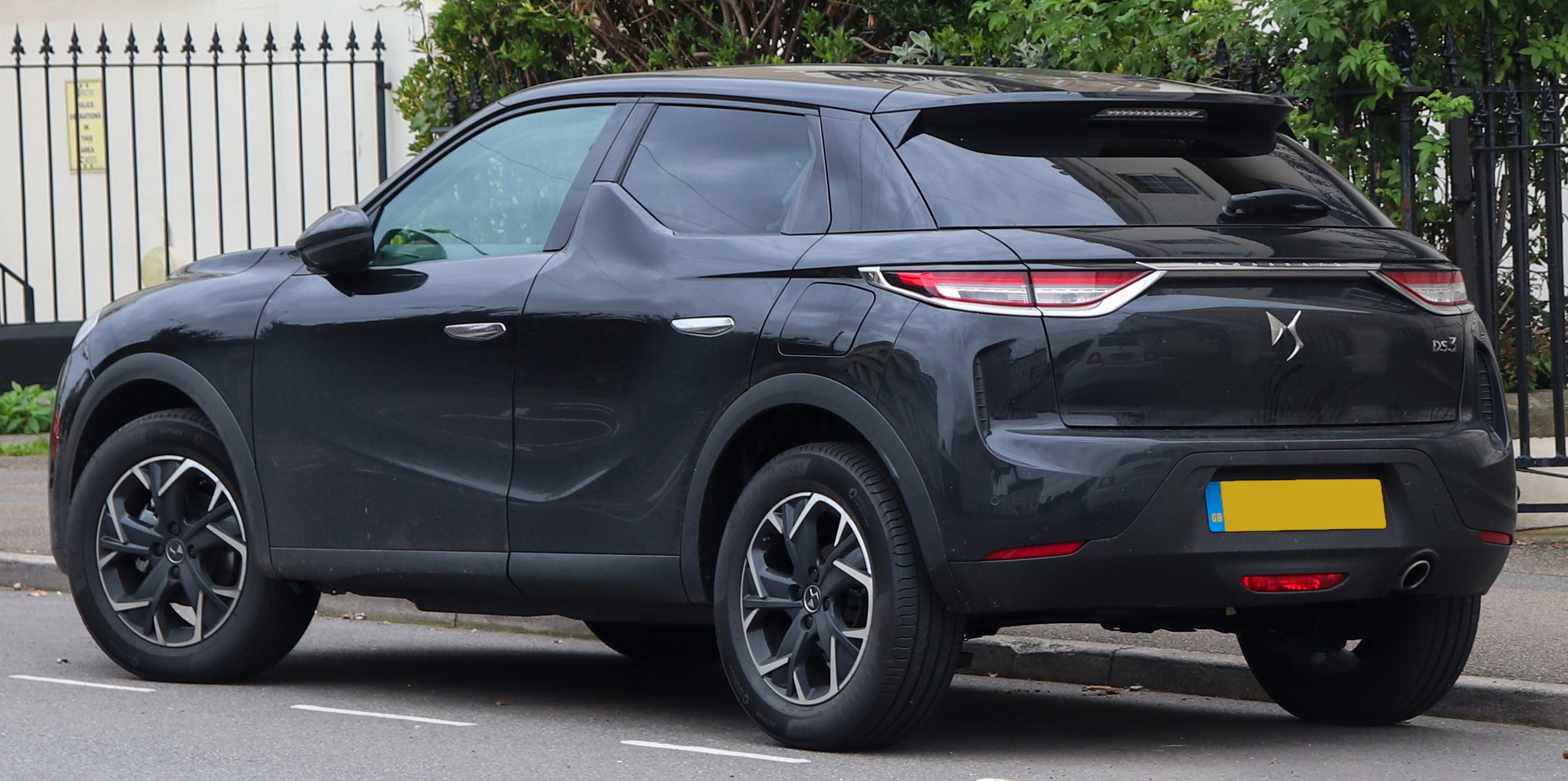
Rear view

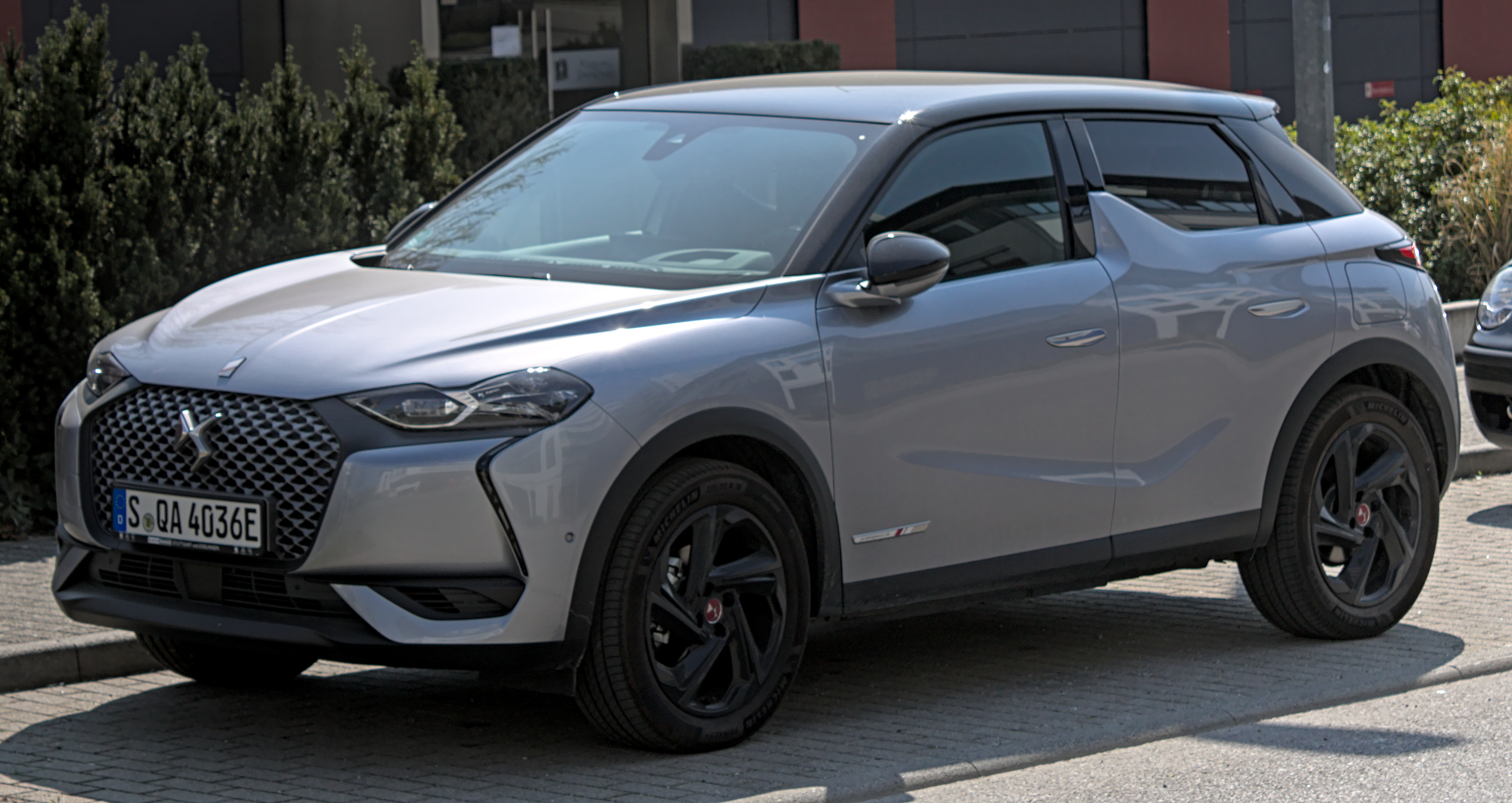
DS 3 Crossback E-Tense

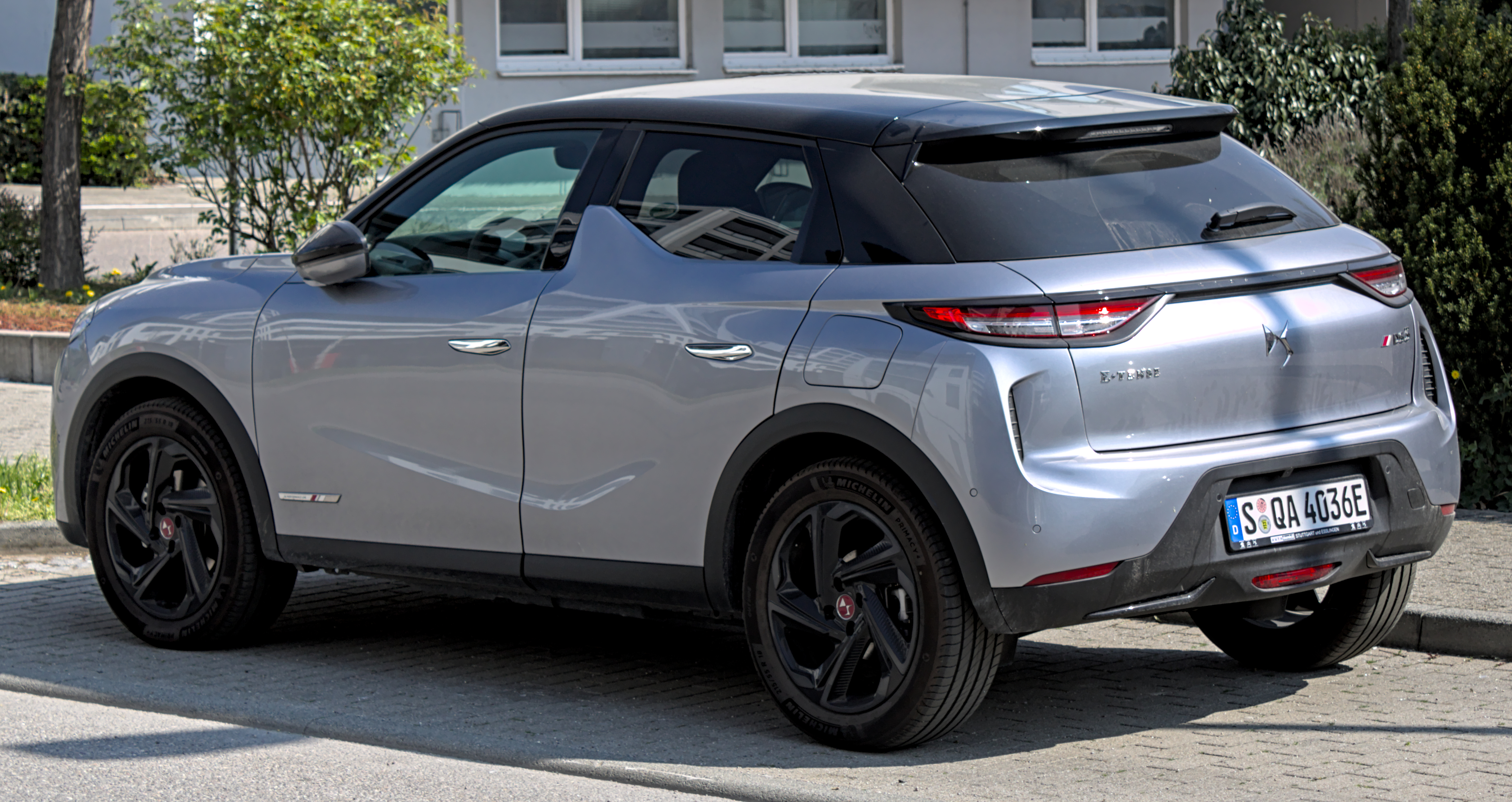
Rear view

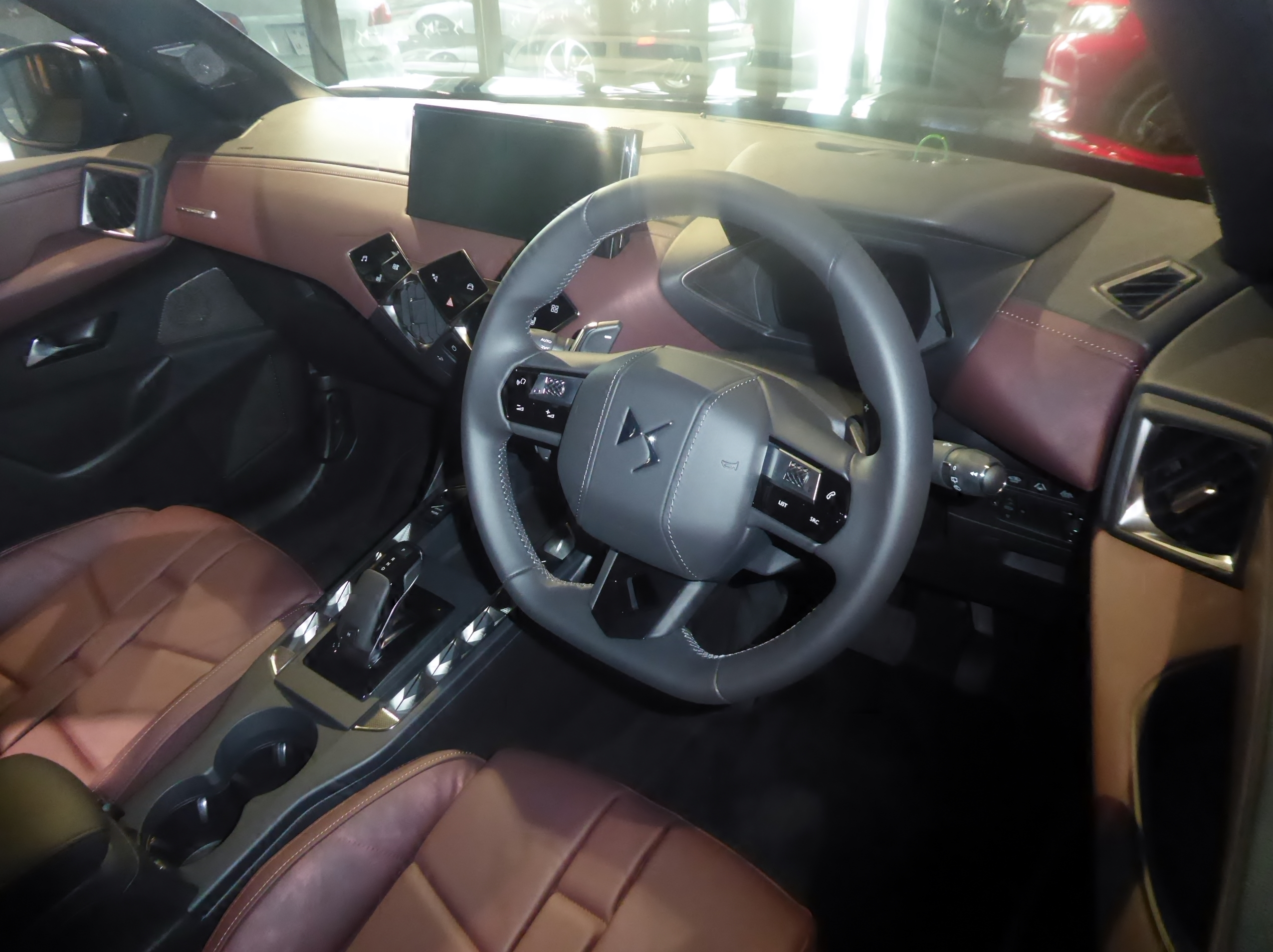
Interior

=== Facelift ===
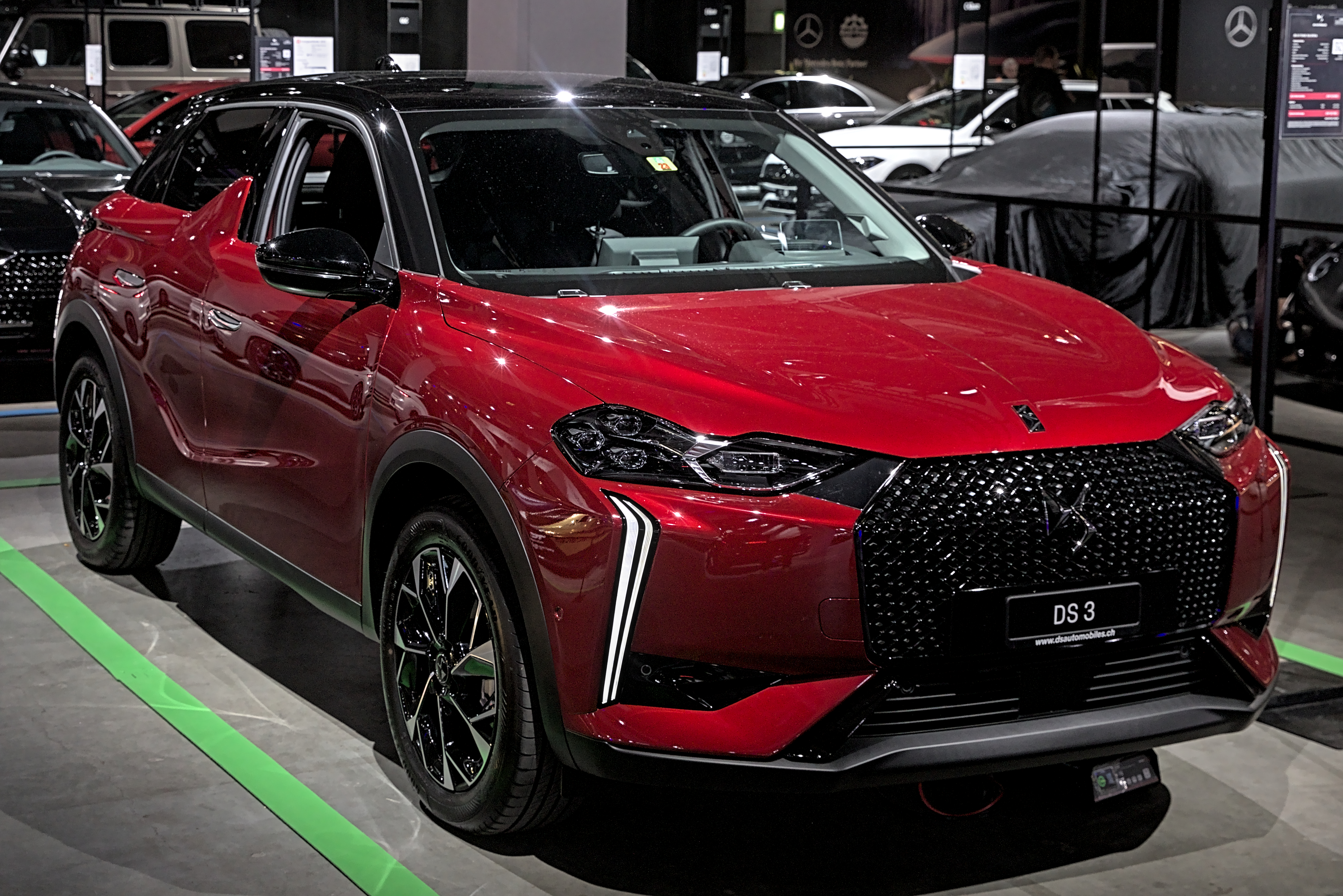
Facelift (front view)

The facelift was introduced on 26 September 2022 alongside Paris Fashion Week, with its name changed back into DS 3 (but marketed as New DS 3).

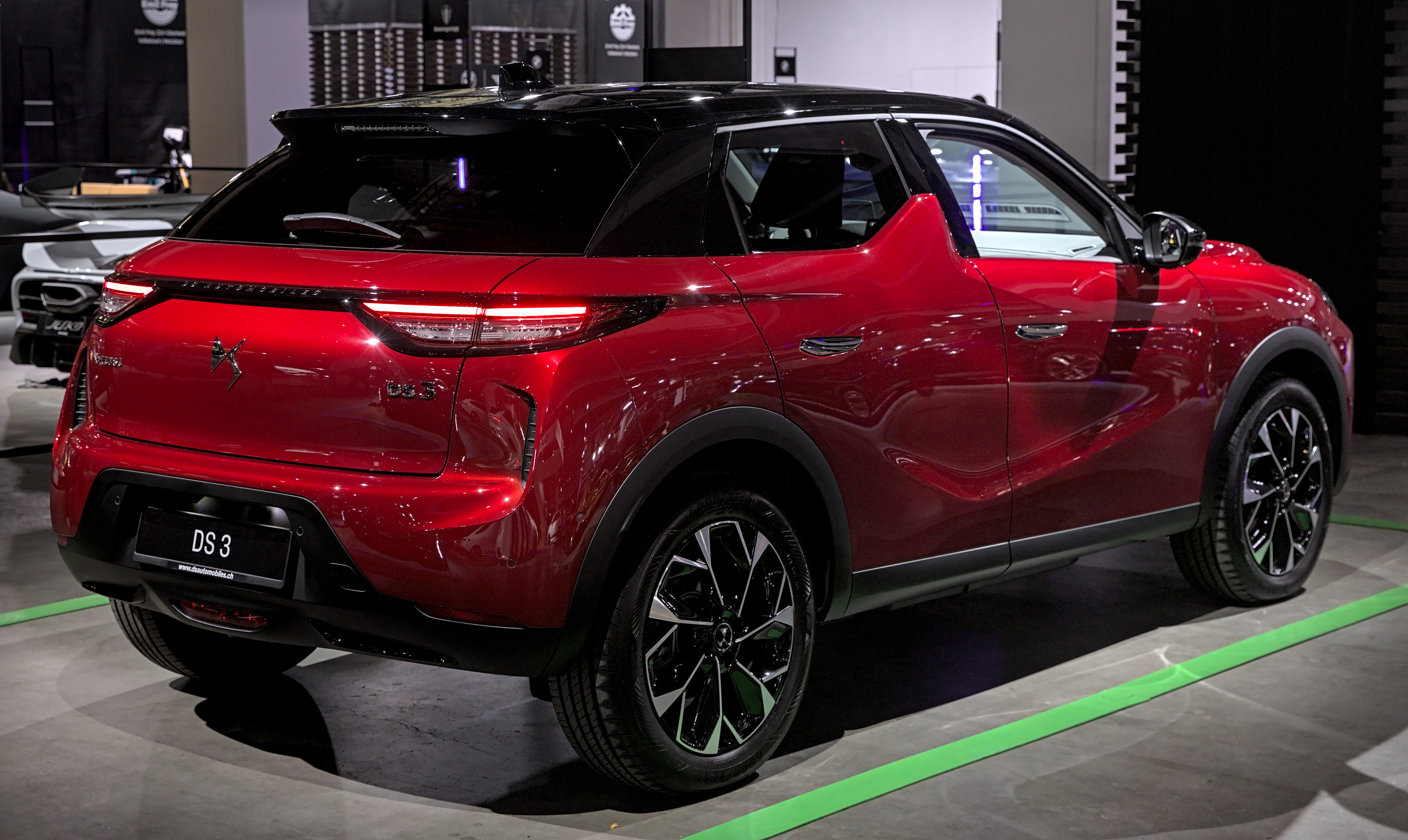
Facelift (rear view)

The grille is restyled with emphasis on gloss black with subtle chromed-diamond tips. The DS Wings have been tweaked to join the grille and headlamps, which have a more dynamic design on the inside with bigger LEDs – two LED lines are vertically arranged on either side of the front.

The E-Tense version had a slightly bigger 54 kWh battery (50.8 kWh usable) with liquid cooling and a heat pump. It recharges either at a DC 100 kW (0–80% in 25 minutes) or at AC 11 kW (0–100% in 5 hours). The powertrain has 156 PS (115 kW) and 260 N⋅m (192 lb⋅ft). DS claims a WLTP combined cycle of up to 402 km and more than 500 km in city traffic, where the new DS 3 can leverage the efficiency of its motor, its ability to recover energy, and the heat pump and thermal pre-conditioning, as well as the new, more efficient LED lights and lowered ground clearance.

==== Safety ====
Euro NCAP test results* Small Off-Road (standard) (2019)
Test	Points	%
Overall:	4 /5 stars	
Adult occupant:	33.1	87%
Child occupant:	42.4	86%
Pedestrian:	26.1	54%
Safety assist:	8.3	63%

Euro NCAP test results* Small Off-Road (safety pack) (2019)
Test	Points	%
Overall:	5 /5 stars	
Adult occupant:	36.5	96%
Child occupant:	42.4	86%
Pedestrian:	31.0	64%
Safety assist:	10.0	76%

=== Engines ===
Petrol engines
Model	Type	Power, Torque/rpm	0–100 km/h (0-62 mph) (s)	Top speed	Transmission	CO_{2} emission (g/km)	Years
1.2 PureTech 100 Manual	1,199 cc (73.2 cu in) I3	100 PS (74 kW; 99 hp) at 5500, 205 N⋅m (151 lb⋅ft) at 1750	10.9	180 km/h (112 mph)	6-speed manual	105 (Low) 113 (High)	12/2018–
1.2 PureTech 130 Automatic	1,199 cc (73.2 cu in) I3	130 PS (96 kW; 128 hp) at 5500, 230 N⋅m (170 lb⋅ft) at 1750	9.2	200 km/h (124 mph)	8-speed automatic	109 (Low) 117 (High)	12/2018–
1.2 PureTech 155 Automatic	1,199 cc (73.2 cu in) I3	155 PS (114 kW; 153 hp) at 5500, 240 N⋅m (177 lb⋅ft) at 1750	8.2	208 km/h (129 mph)	8-speed automatic	114 (Low) 121 (High)	12/2018–09/2022

Diesel engines
Model	Type	Power, Torque/rpm	0–100 km/h (0-62 mph) (s)	Top speed	Transmission	CO_{2} emission (g/km)	Years
BlueHDi 100 Manual	1,499 cc (91.5 cu in) I4	102 PS (75 kW; 101 hp) at 3500, 250 N⋅m (184 lb⋅ft) at 1750	11.4	180 km/h (112 mph)	6-speed manual	97-100	12/2018–10/2020
BlueHDi 110 Manual	1,499 cc (91.5 cu in) I4	110 PS (81 kW; 108 hp) at 3750, 250 N⋅m (184 lb⋅ft) at 1750	10.6	194 km/h (121 mph)	6-speed manual	99–100	10/2020–09/2022
BlueHDi 130 Automatic	1,499 cc (91.5 cu in) I4	130 PS (96 kW; 128 hp) at 3750, 300 N⋅m (221 lb⋅ft) at 1750	9.9	195 km/h (121 mph)	8-speed automatic	102	12/2018–

Electric motor (E-Tense)
Battery capacity	Power, Torque	0–100 km/h (0-62 mph) (s)	Top speed	Transmission	All-electric range (WLTP)	Years
50 kWh Lithium-Ion Battery	136 PS (100 kW; 134 hp), 260 N⋅m (192 lb⋅ft)	8.7	150 km/h (93 mph)	1-speed automatic	340 km (211 mi) (Low) 307 km (191 mi) (High)	03/2019–09/2022
54 kWh Lithium-Ion Battery	156 PS (115 kW; 154 hp), 260 N⋅m (192 lb⋅ft)		150 km/h (93 mph)	1-speed automatic	402 km (250 mi)	09/2022–

== Sales ==
Year	China
Year	DS 3 E-Tense
2023	2
2024	2
