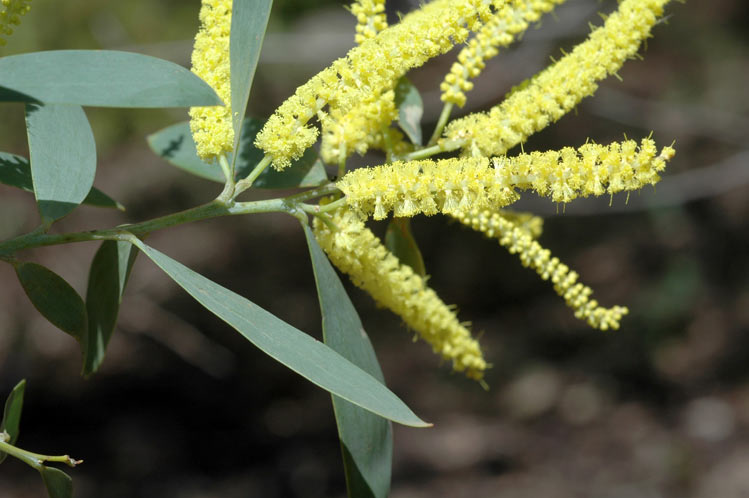

Scientific classification
- Kingdom: Plantae
- Clade: Tracheophytes
- Clade: Angiosperms
- Clade: Eudicots
- Clade: Rosids
- Order: Fabales
- Family: Fabaceae
- Subfamily: Caesalpinioideae
- Clade: Mimosoid clade
- Genus: Acacia
- Species: A. bulgaensis

Binomial name
- Acacia bulgaensis Tindale & S.J.Davies
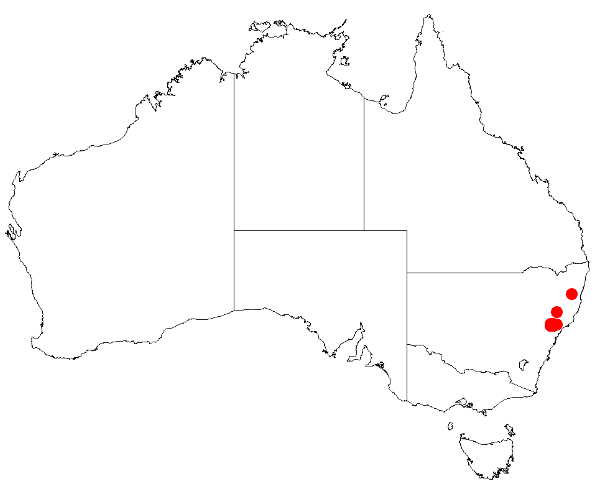

Synonyms
- Racosperma bulgaense (Tindale & S.J.Davies) Pedley

= Acacia bulgaensis =

Bulga wattle

Species of legume

Acacia bulgaensis, commonly known as Bulga wattle, is a species of flowering plant in the family Fabaceae and is endemic to a small area of New South Wales. It is a shrub or small tree with narrowly elliptic to very narrowly elliptic phyllodes, bright yellow flowers in pairs of heads in racemes in leafy shoots, and flat linear, thinly leathery pods, appearing somewhat like a string of beads.

== Description ==
Acacia bulgaensis is a shrub or small tree that typically grows to a height of 1.5–8 m (4 ft 11 in – 26 ft 3 in) and has grey-brown, dark brown or reddish brown bark that peels in small flakes and is fibrous below. It has glabrous, light-brown to reddish-brown branchlets often with a white, powdery bloom. Its mature phyllodes are narrowly elliptic to very narrowly elliptic, 35–100 mm (1.4–3.9 in) long, 7–15 mm (0.28–0.59 in) wide, leathery and often glaucous. The flowers are bright yellow and usually borne in two cylindrical spikes on racemes 3–9 mm (0.12–0.35 in) long on shoots 30–52 mm (1.2–2.0 in) long. Flowering occurs from September to March and the pods are linear, 20–95 mm (0.79–3.74 in) long and 3–5 mm (0.12–0.20 in) wide, thinly leathery, appearing somewhat like a string of beads and glabrous, containing dark brown to black seeds 4–5 mm (0.16–0.20 in) long.

== Taxonomy ==
Acacia bulgaensis was first formally described in 1992 by Mary Tindale and Stuart James Davies in Australian Systematic Botany from specimens collected 6 mi (9.7 km) south-west of Bulga in 1972. The specific epithet (bulgaensis) is named after Bulga, near where the species occurs.

== Distribution ==
Bulga wattle is endemic to the Hunter Valley region of New South Wales where it grows in hilly, sandstone country in open forest and woodland near Bulga, Broke and Milbrodale.

== See also ==
- List of Acacia species
