= Aboriginal sites of New South Wales =

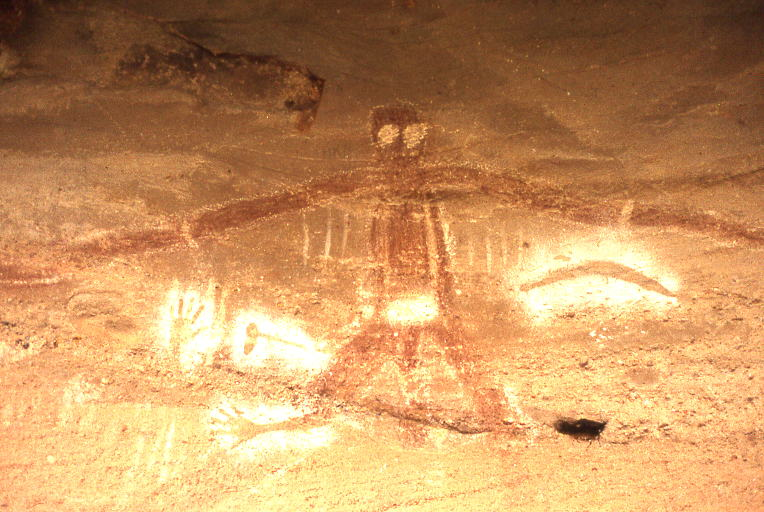
Baiame Cave, Milbrodale

Aboriginal sites of New South Wales consist of a large number of places in the Australian state of New South Wales where it is still possible to see visible signs of the activities and culture of the Aboriginal Australian peoples who previously occupied these areas.

These sites are comparable with the petroglyphs of Native Americans and the Indigenous rock art found elsewhere in Australia, but are not restricted to rock carvings. Many of the sites are on the (now defunct) Register of the National Estate.

== History and description ==
Aboriginal Australians arrived in the north of Australia at least 70,000 years ago, and potentially 120,000 years ago. Sites over 22,000 years old have been found in the Blue Mountains area west of Sydney, while sites going back 40,000 years exist at Lake Mungo. There are some thousands of known sites, many but not all located in national parks. Some sites are also found in more suburban settings; rock carvings can be seen in the Sydney suburbs of North Bondi and Tamarama.

Their art was part of day-to-day life and would normally have had a purpose. One such purpose is thought to have been what some people call "wish fulfilment magic"—or sympathetic magic—in which the act of creating the magical work is thought to bring about the event depicted in the work. For example, a hunting scene—a common subject in rock carvings—would be aimed at bringing about the desired reality of good hunting.

There were also many artworks that were created for specific ceremonial purposes and which were not intended to last after the ceremony was over. In addition to such themes, there were also works of a more secular nature, which could be created for a number of reasons, including the instruction and entertainment of children.

There are substantial variations in the character of art developed in different parts of New South Wales. Art in the western part of the state could be very different from the art created in coastal areas. Aboriginal sites in the state are administered by the NSW National Parks & Wildlife Service. All known sites are recorded on the register known as the Aboriginal Heritage Information Management System (AHIMS), which is run by the NSW National Parks & Wildlife Service and protects sites under the National Parks and Wildlife Act 1974.

There is generally a policy of protecting Aboriginal sites, although a small number of sites are publicised. Notable examples are those at the Basin Track, Ku-ring-gai Chase National Park and the Bulgandry site, Brisbane Water National Park. However, most sites are not publicised, and restricted sites (colloquially known as sacred sites) will never be made public. If anyone thinks they have a legitimate reason for wanting to inspect sites that are not normally available to the public, they can apply to AHIMS for permission.

The sites are of many different types, for example:

- Paintings
- Rock carvings
- Hand stencils
- Charcoal drawings
- Shell middens
- Shield trees
- Restricted sites
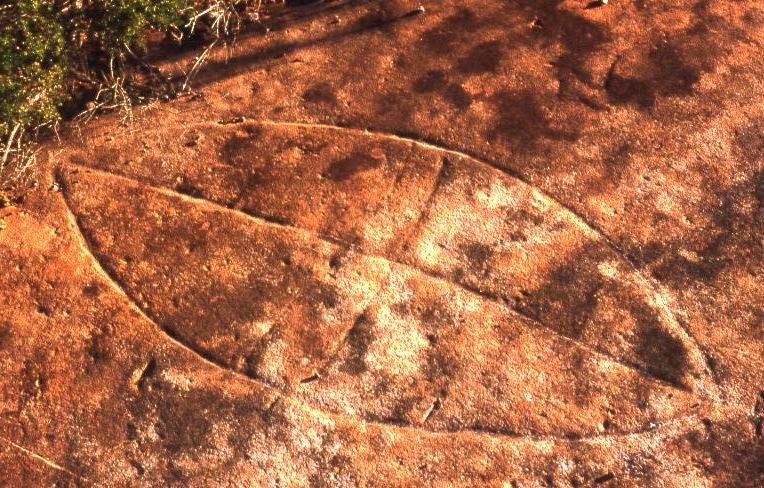
Rock carving, Bantry Bay, Garigal National Park

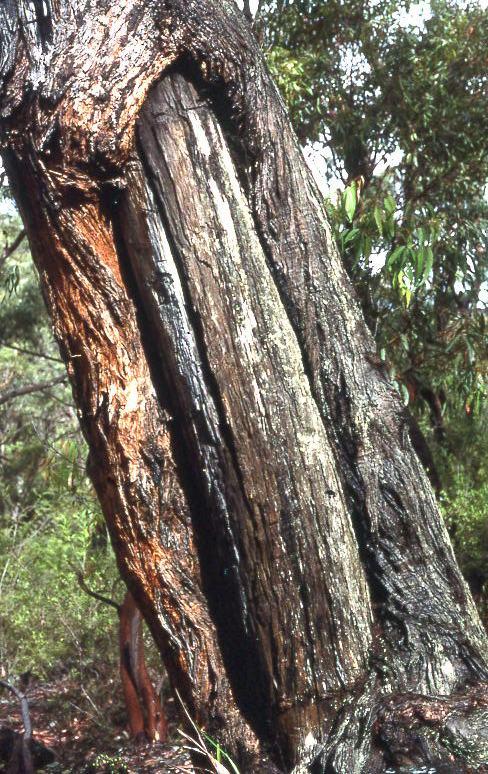
Shield tree, Bullawarring Track, Heathcote National Park

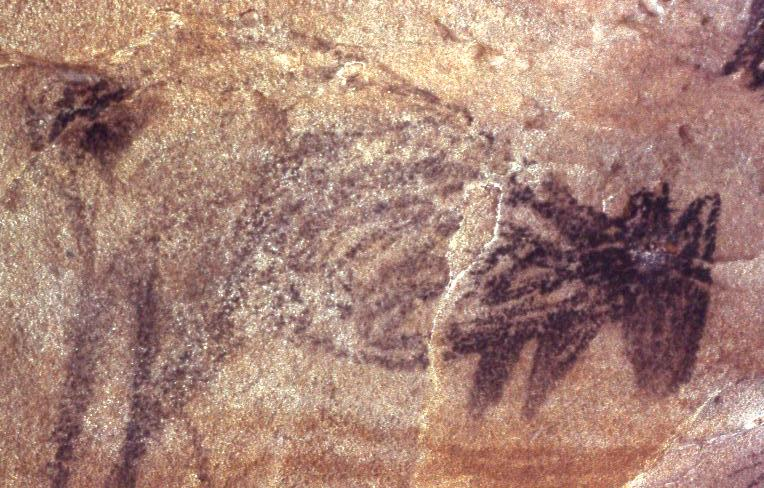
Charcoal drawing, Myuna Creek, Heathcote National Park

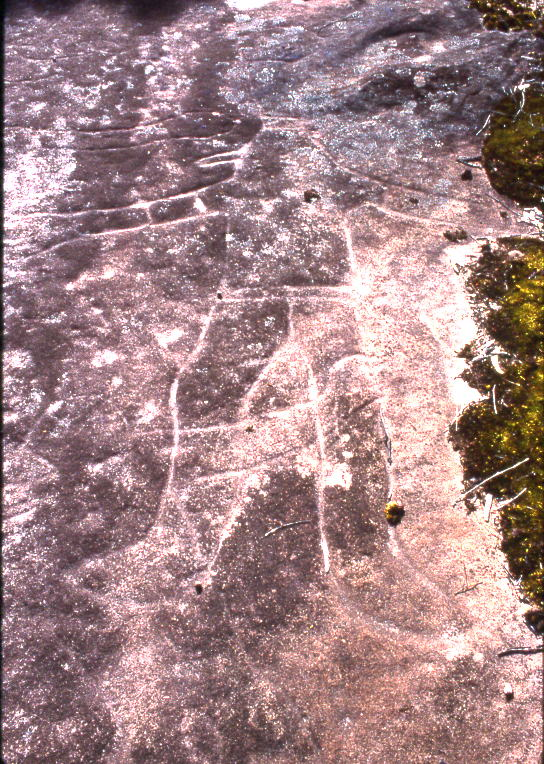
Rock carving, Bulgandry, Brisbane Water National Park

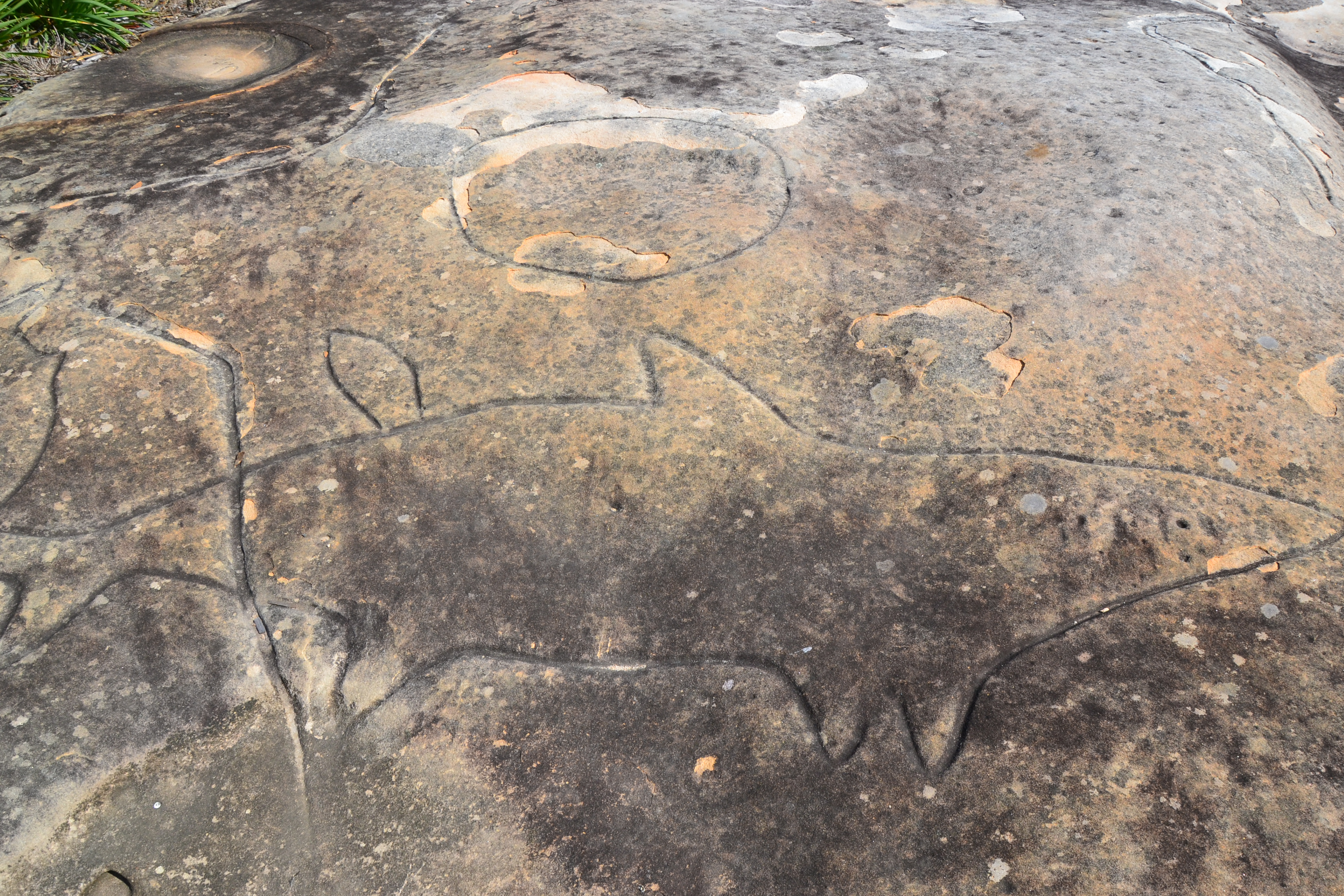
Rock carvings, North Bondi

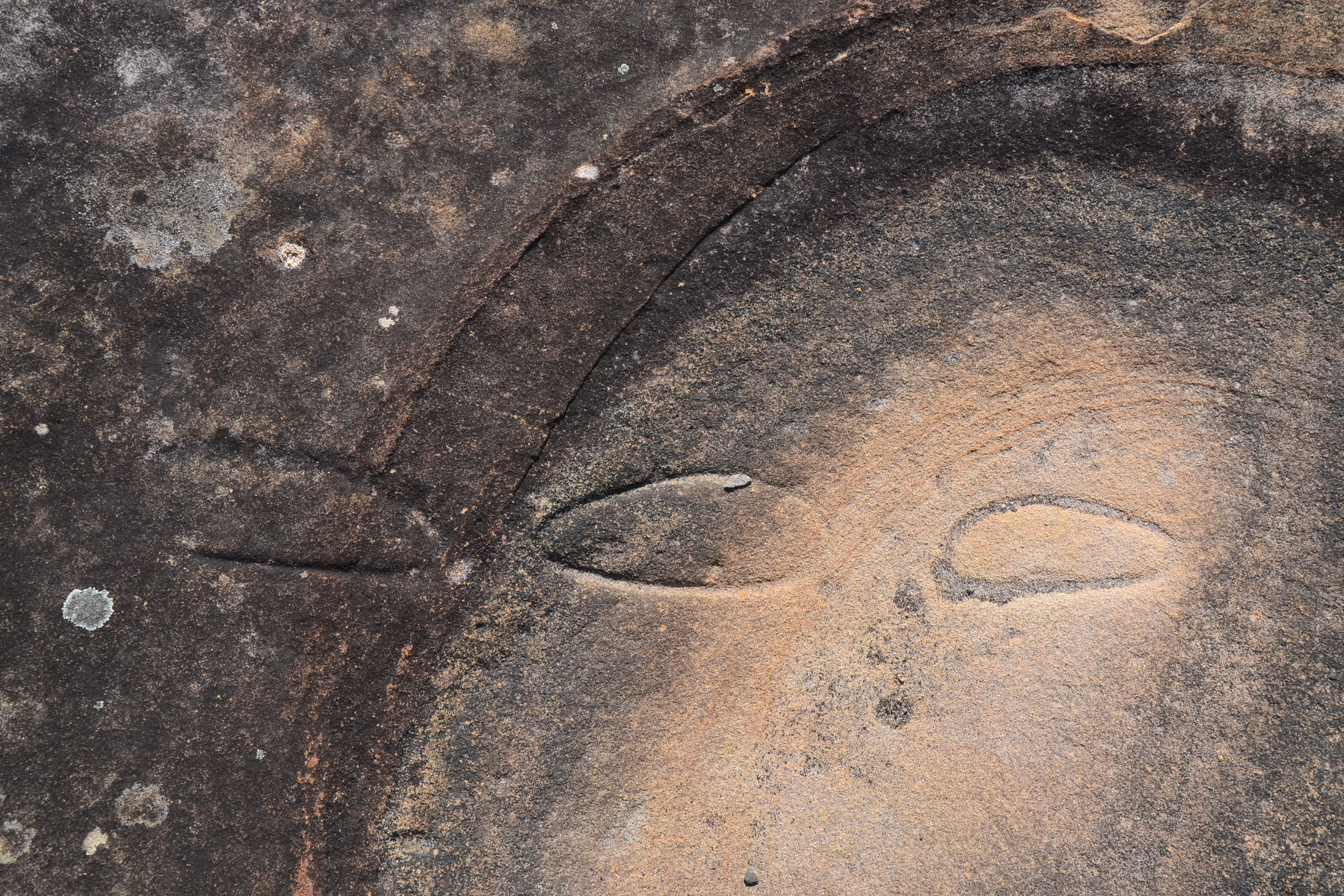
Mundoes, North Bondi

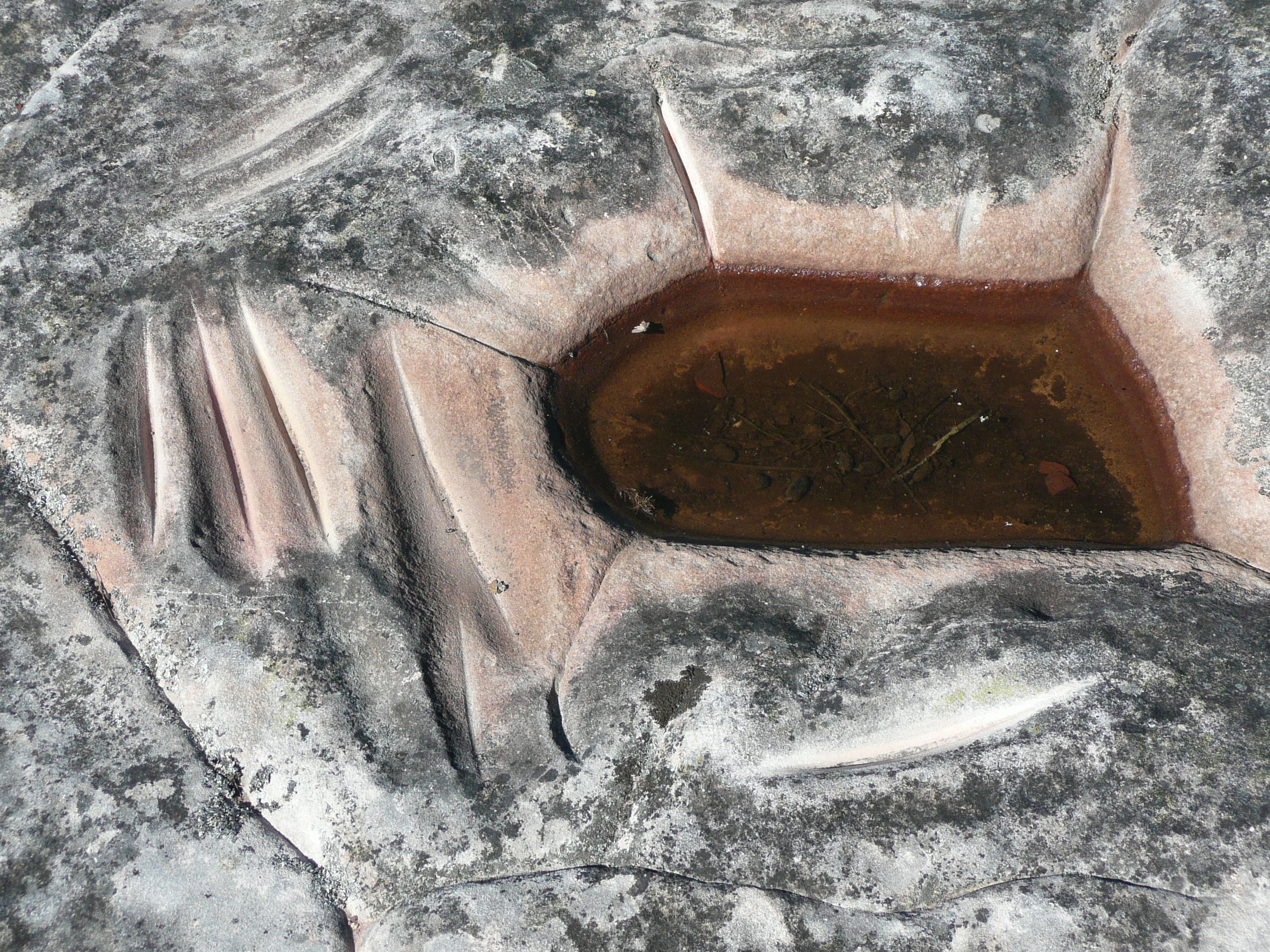
Grinding grooves, Kings Tableland Aboriginal Site, Wentworth Falls

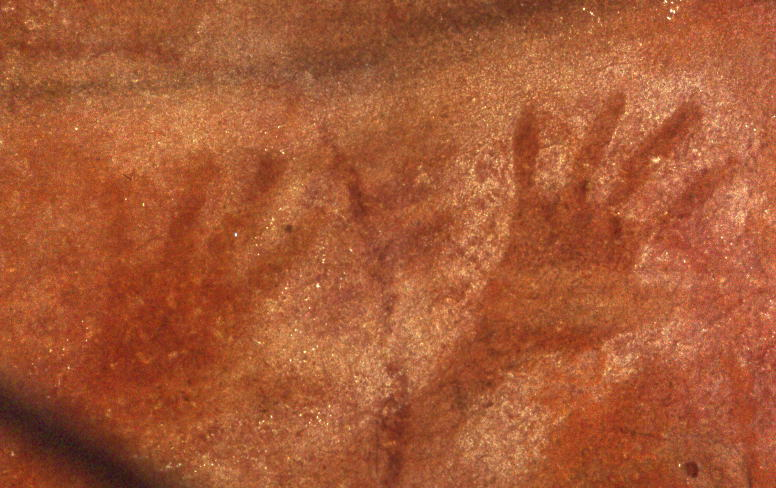
Hand stencils, Red Hands Cave, Blue Mountains National Park

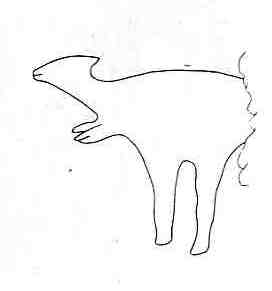
European imitation, Grotto Point, Sydney Harbour National Park

Paintings cover a wide range of subjects, both spiritual and secular. Coloured pigmentation was created with ochre (giving a red/orange colour), charcoal (for a black pigmentation) and ash (for grey pigmentation). One good example is the rock shelter known as Baiame Cave, at Milbrodale, with paintings depicting a large figure that may be Baiame, the Sky Father.

Rock carvings, also known as petroglyphs or rock engravings, are of a style known as "simple figurative", which conventional archaeological thinking dates to the last 5000 years. Other engravings show European sailing ships, and so cannot be more than about 200 years old. Thus we are left with a date range of 5000–200 years ago. It is likely that some of the freshest engravings represent the later part of that time range, whilst the most worn represent the earliest part. However, the situation is complicated by the fact that we know the engravings were sometimes "re-grooved" during ceremonies. Carvings could be very large. In some carvings, the figure of Baiame the Sky Father could be eighteen metres tall.

In addition to pictorial carvings, there are many grinding grooves, caused by grinding stone implements on a rock surface to shape them and give them an edge. Areas like Sydney and the Blue Mountains have many rock carvings because they predominantly consist of sandstone (known as Hawkesbury sandstone), which is a very suitable surface for rock carvings. See Sydney Rock Engravings for the main article on these.

Hand stencils can often be found in rock shelters and caves, which have given them protection from the elements over the years. They were created by placing the hand on a rocky surface and blowing pigmentation around it, leaving the silhouette of the hand on the rock. There is often a number of them in one place. The best-known example is Red Hands Cave, in the Blue Mountains National Park, which has many stencils, including those created by children as well as adults.

Charcoal drawings were exactly that: drawings executed with a piece of charcoal. Like the rock carvings, they could be of a wide range of subjects, with animals often featured.

Shell middens developed in occupation sites where shell fish were consumed. Over the years, layers of shells would build up, creating a concentration of many shells in the soil around the occupation site.

Shield trees are seen occasionally in the Sydney bush. A substantial piece of bark would be cut out of a tree and used as a shield or tray. A visible "scar" was thus left behind, which could vary considerably in size, some being quite large.

Restricted areas, or sacred sites, are usually of a spiritual nature and were restricted to adult males and, in some cases, women. These sites could include ceremonial sites, bora grounds, men's sites and women's birthing sites.

Many of the sites are on the (now defunct) Register of the National Estate.

== Types of sites ==
It is necessary to distinguish between occupation sites and sacred sites. Not all Aboriginal sites are "sacred sites"; the reality is more complex. Before the colonisation of Australia, most Indigenous sites were occupation sites, which were used by all members of a tribe. Sacred sites, on the other hand, were restricted to adult males, except for certain women's sites. In more recent times, all Indigenous sites have become known as sacred sites; those that were previously known as sacred sites are now known as restricted sites.

== Imitations ==
There are also a number of imitation sites, in which Europeans created imitations of Aboriginal art, usually in the form of rock carvings. One of the most prominent examples is a large carving of a kangaroo alongside a walking track at Grotto Point, in the Sydney Harbour National Park. This has been known for some time to be an imitation.

== Examples ==
- Appletree Aboriginal Area, 75 km (47 mi) north-west of Newcastle. A group of rock shelters with hand stencils and paintings of human figures. Listed on the Register of the National Estate.
- Baiame Cave, Milbrodale. A large rock shelter with paintings of a human figure plus objects like boomerangs. Listed on the Register of the National Estate.
- Bondi Golf Course, North Bondi. Contains a group of rock carvings. (A nearby group of carvings is thought to have been done by Portuguese sailors in the 18th century.)
- Brisbane Water National Park, Central Coast. The park contains many Aboriginal sites, notable Bulgandry on the Woy Woy Road, with many rock carvings.
- Garigal National Park, Sydney. A large group of rock carvings is located near Bantry Bay.
- Heathcote National Park, south of Sydney. Various sites are known, including a shield tree west of the Bullawarring Track, adjacent to an occupation cave, plus a group of charcoal drawings alongside Myuna Creek.
- Kings Tableland Aboriginal Site, Wentworth Falls. A rocky knoll is topped by a group of large grinding grooves, plus carved images of wallaby and emu tracks. On the eastern side of the hill there is an occupation cave.
- Koonadan Historic Site, a Wiradjuri ceremonial and burial site in the Riverina region of southern NSW.
- Ku-ring-gai Chase National Park, north of Sydney. Contains many sites, notably those along the Basin Track, the Echidna Track, the Cowan Track and the Red Hand Track.
- Mootwingee Aboriginal Site, western New South Wales. Secure waterholes made this an area for Aboriginal life. Contains galleries of paintings and carvings. On the Register of the National Estate.
- Mungo National Park, western New South Wales, contains the oldest known remains of humans in Australia, dating back 40,000 years, plus artifacts, tools, fireplaces and hearths.
- Muogamarra Nature Reserve, Hawkesbury River area, contains numerous sites including carvings and grinding grooves.
- Mutawintji Historic Site, north-east of Broken Hill, contains excellent collection of rock art. Access is restricted to guided tours.
- Mutawintji National Park, north-east of Broken Hill, contains galleries of rock art and paintings.
- Red Hands Cave, Blue Mountains National Park, outside Glenbrook, contains large collection of hand stencils.
- Stonewoman Aboriginal Area, Inverell area, features Tingha Stonewoman rock formation, a teaching and ceremonial site.
- Tamarama, Sydney. A large carving of a whale and fish is located beside the path from Bondi Beach to Tamarama.
- Wollemi National Park, north of the Blue Mountains, contains many Aboriginal sites, notably at Eagles Reach Cave, discovered by bushwalkers in 1995.

== See also ==
- Sydney rock engravings
- Australian Aboriginal sacred sites
