= Skid plate =

Protective shield under a vehicle

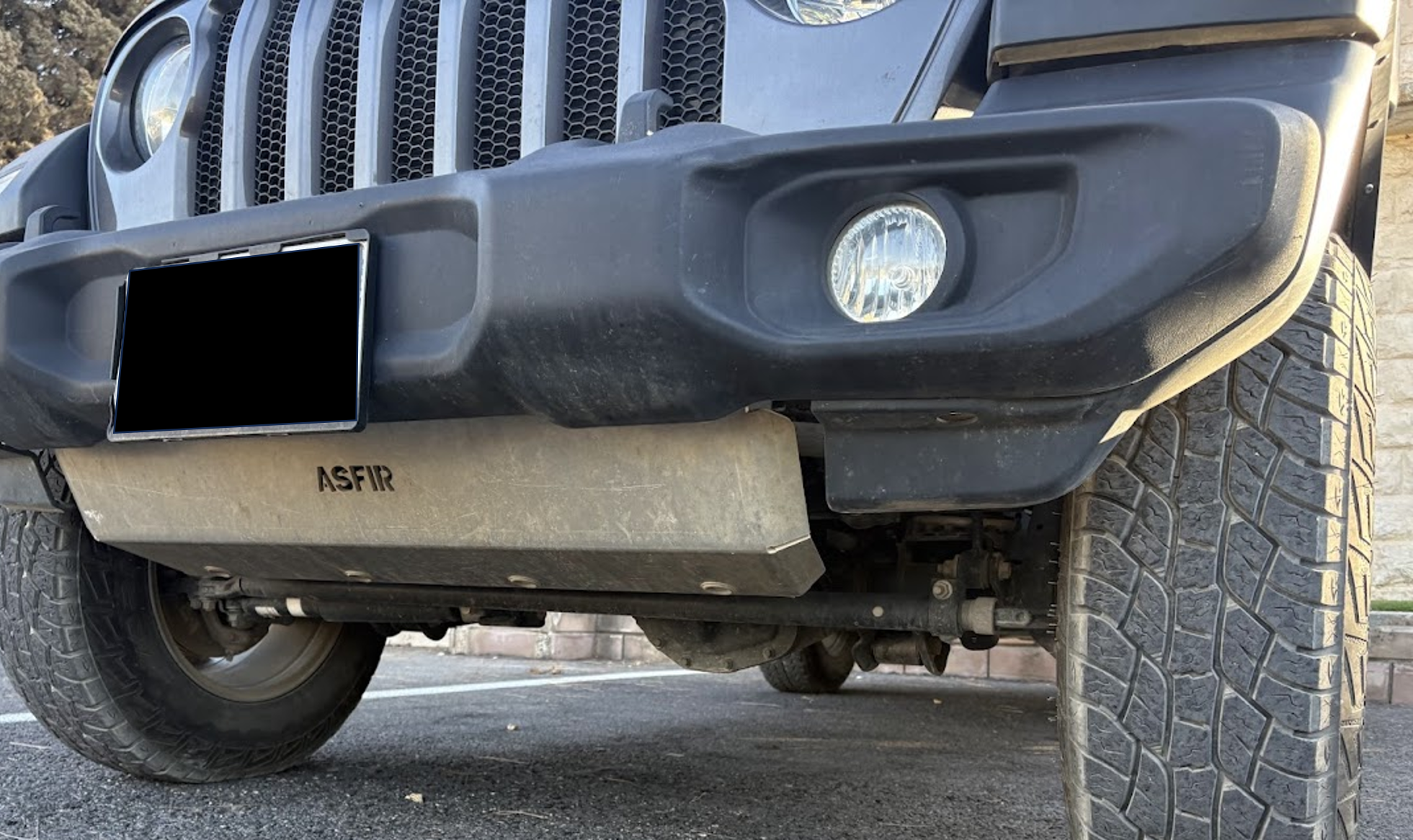
Aftermarket skid plate on a Jeep Wrangler JL

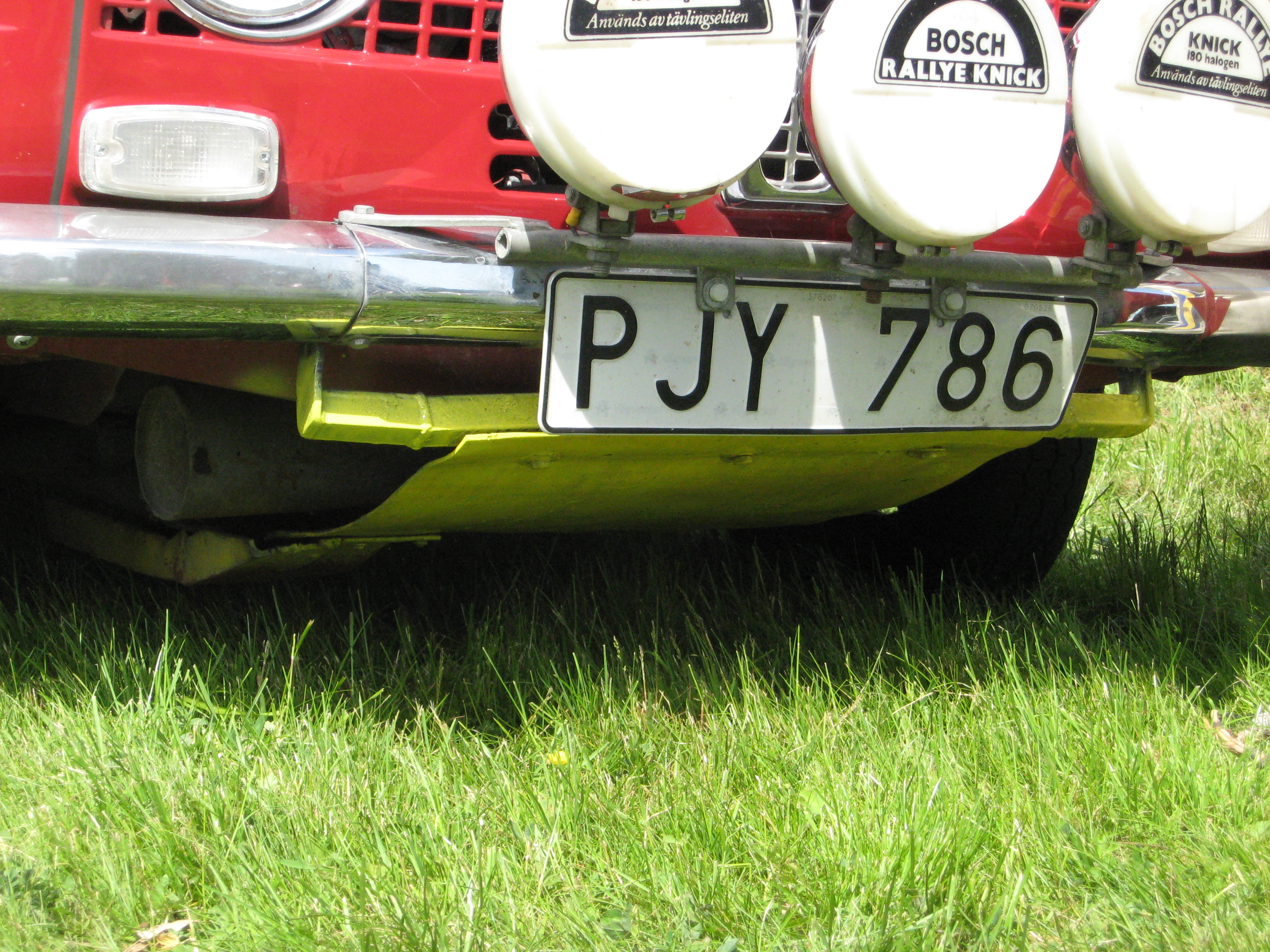
Retrofitted skid plate on a Saab 96.

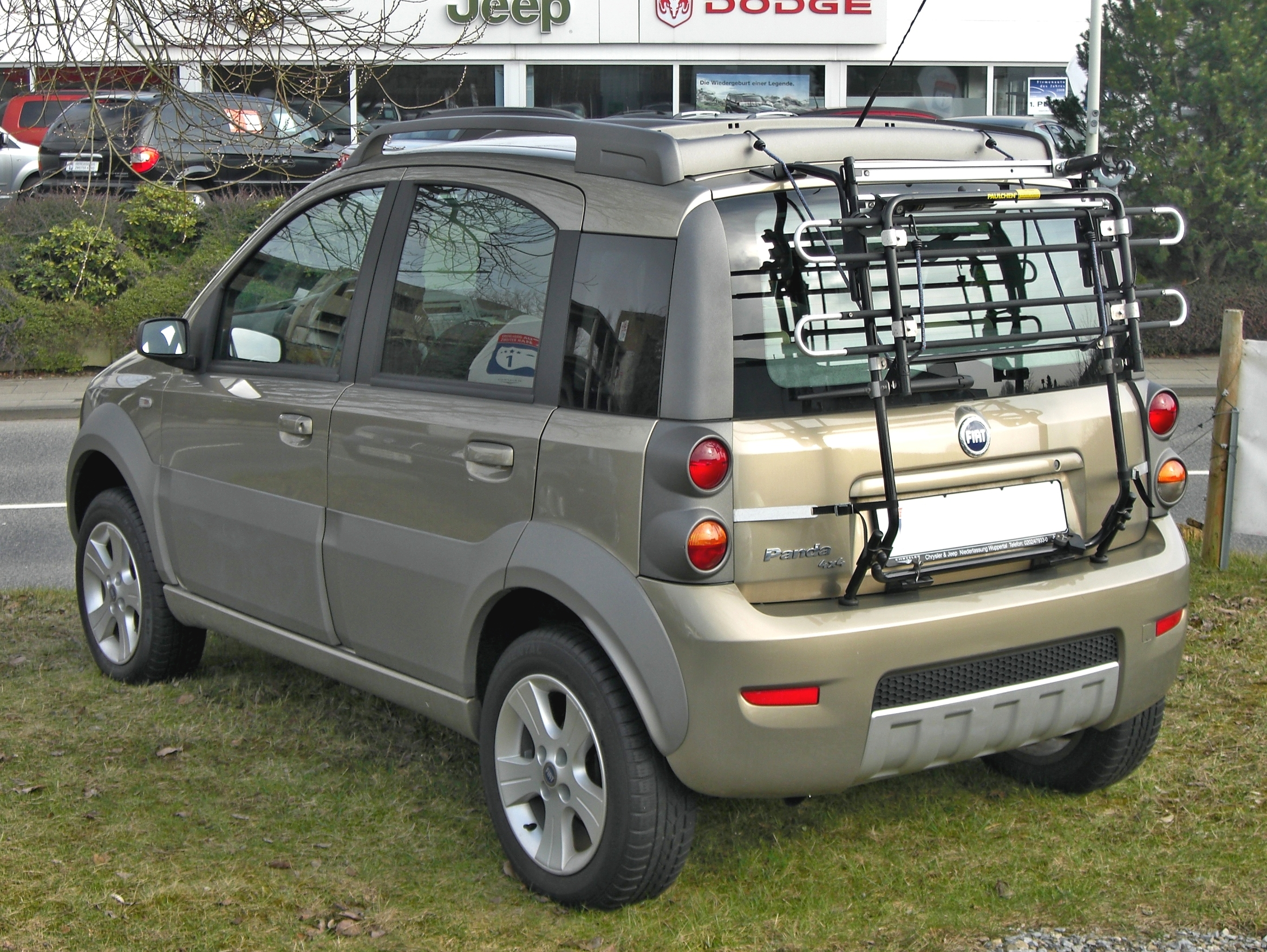
Cosmetic (fake) skid plate

A skid plate is an abrasion-resistant shield affixed to the underside of a vehicle or boat to prevent damage to the underside when contact is made with the ground. It is usually made from plastic or metal (usually aluminum or steel).

Skid plates may be used on off-road vehicles, motorcycles and lowered vehicles to prevent damage to components in the vehicle underbody. Fake skid plates are also added to vehicles for an off-road look.

== Advantages of skid plates ==
- Additional protection to specific components, such as engine and gearbox in a car, or frame, motor and linkage on an off-road motorcycle.
- Increased resistance against any impact or debris found on the road.

== Factors in the design of skid plates ==
- Weight: heavier skid plates will offer more protection, at the expense of fuel economy, suspension wear, and increased difficulty in recovery and installation. Generally, steel skid plates will weigh twice as much as aluminum skid plates, which in turn weigh twice as much as plastic skid plates.
- Coverage areas: depending on the design of the vehicle, some parts of the underbody may be more vulnerable than others to damage. Some important components to protect include the oil sump, transfer case, differentials and exhaust.
- Ease of installation: some skid plates bolt on to existing parts of the vehicle's frame, while others require modifications to the frame e.g. grinding, welding, or drilling.
- Ease of maintenance: some skid plates come with openings or access doors to enable routine oil and fluid changes, while others require removal and reinstallation to perform maintenance.
- Climate / road conditions: Skid plates from materials that corrode (e.g. steel) may require touch ups and maintenance in wet trails or areas with high salt usage on the roads.
- Modularity: some skid plates are modular, enabling installation and removal of sections separately, while others are designed as several overlapping pieces ("full belly"). Modular designs are more budget friendly, allowing for gradual installation and protection as the need or budget arises, while full-belly system can be stronger.

== See also ==
- Rock sliders
- Metal bumpers
