= Rock crawling =

Extreme type of recreational off-road driving

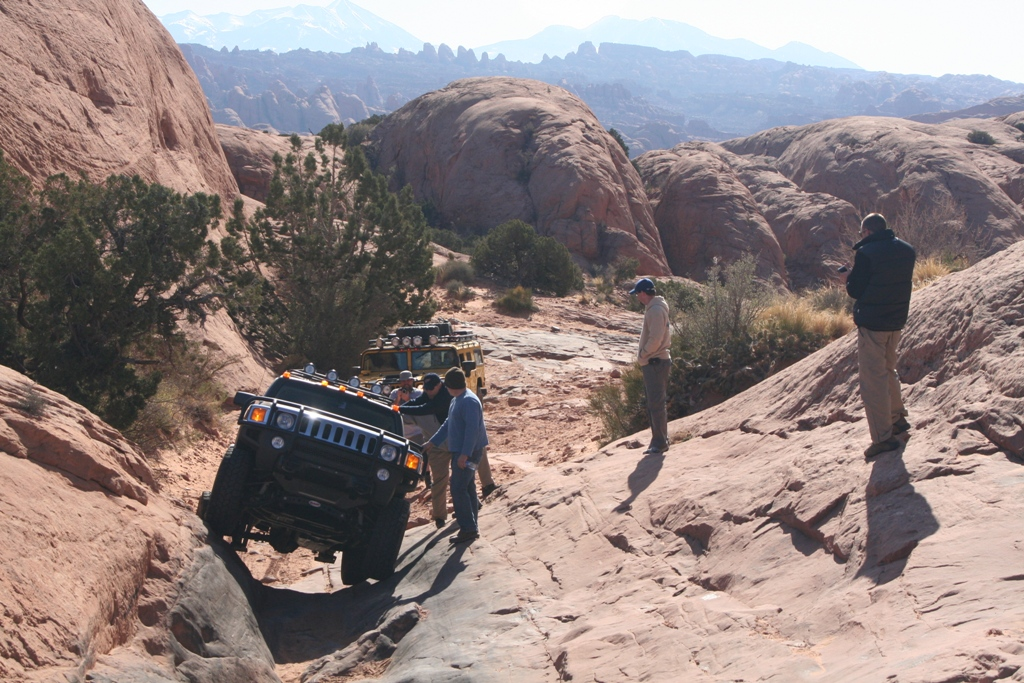
Hummer H3 in Moab, Utah

Rock crawling is an extreme form of off-road driving using specialized vehicles ranging from stock to highly modified, to overcome obstacles. In rock crawling, drivers typically drive highly modified four-wheel-drive vehicles such as trucks, Jeeps, and "buggies" over very harsh terrain. Driving locations include boulders, mountain foothills, rock piles, mountain trails, etc.

Rock crawling is about slow-speed, careful and precise driving, and high torque generated through large gear reductions (100:1 or more) in the vehicle's drivetrain. Rock crawlers often drive up, down and across obstacles that appear impassable.

Rock crawling competitions range from local events to national series. These consist of 100–200-yard (91–183 m) long courses with obstacles set up with gates, similar to a slalom ski race.

== Rock crawling basics ==
=== Vehicles ===
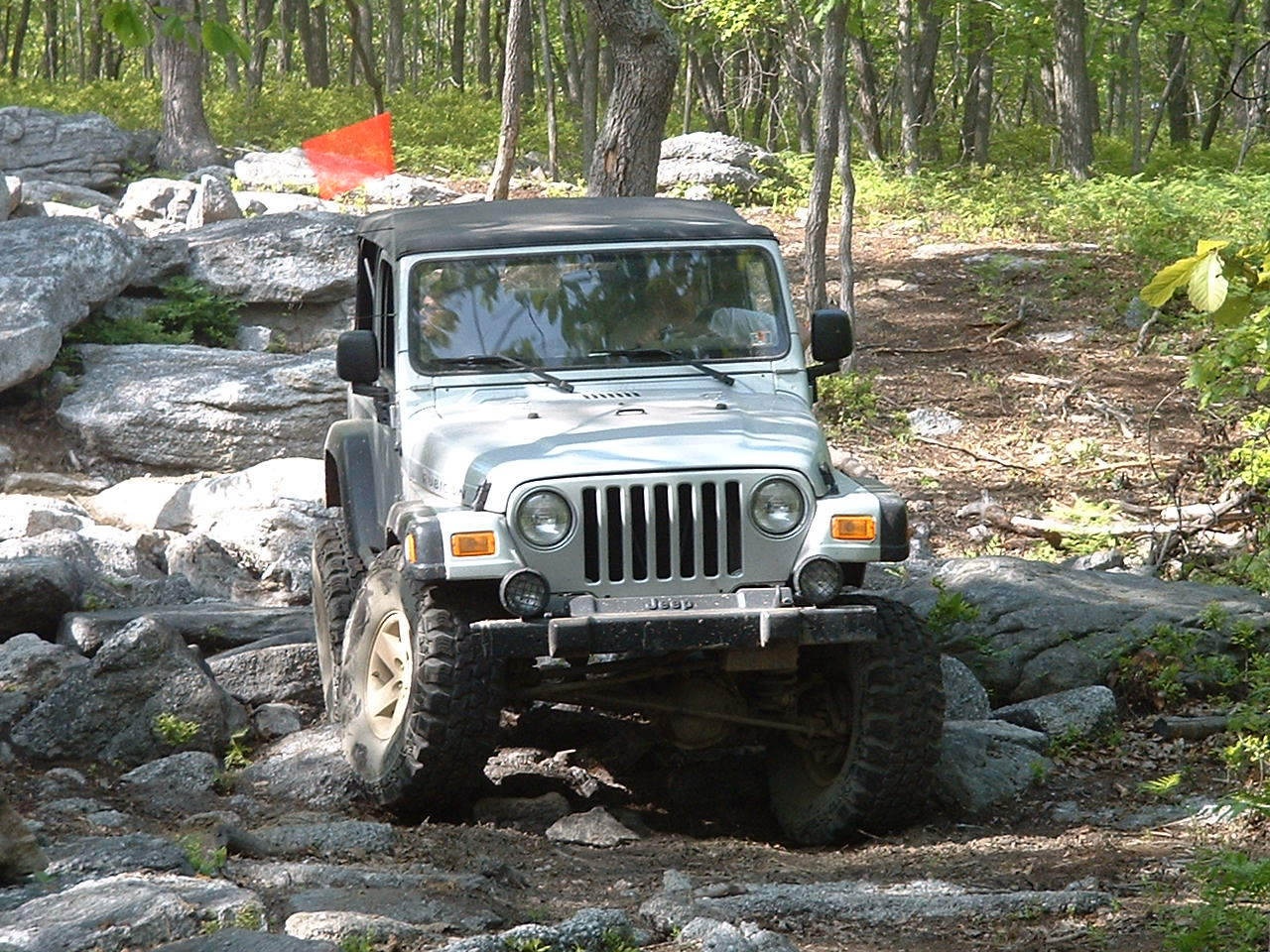
Jeep Rubicon Rock Crawling

Vehicles commonly used include Jeep (the Chrysler and the Mitsubishi Varieties), Lada Niva, BAW, Nissan Patrol, Toyota Hilux, Toyota Land Cruiser, Land Rover, Mercedes-Benz G-Class, Santana PS-10, Ford Bronco, Suzuki Samurai, International Scout among many other 4x4's. These vehicles are outfitted with custom parts. Rock Crawlers can be built by a wide array of companies as well as in people's garages. Power is usually not an issue, as rock crawlers typically lower their gear ratios in order to drive more slowly over obstacles without stalling the engine. These custom parts can include:

1. locking differentials
2. taller off-road tires
3. upgraded suspension
4. four wheel steering
5. heavy duty steering components/solid front axle
6. roll cage for driver protection
7. lowered gearing in either or all of the transmission, transfer case (including often employing a second transfer case to reduce gearing even more), or axle differentials
8. winches
9. barwork (bullbar, rock sliders, brush bars, rear bar/tyre carrier and/or external roll cage bolted or welded to frame)
10. armour (protects exposed underbody components: radiator, engine oil sump, driveline)
11. beadlocks (locks tires to the rims for low tire pressures)
12. long-travel shock absorbers, drop shackles, spring-over conversions (to increase wheel travel), coil-over spring/shock combinations, and upgraded control arms
13. portal axles

Oversized, low-pressure, knobby, mud-terrain tires are used. Most vehicles have a low-geared transfer case to make the most torque in the low speeds used for rock crawling. Suspension-wise, rock crawling vehicles sometimes have after-market lift kits installed, raising the chassis and increasing suspension flex, though the rock crawlers running the tougher trails often have fabricated suspension systems, or home-assembled leaf packs to cheaply achieve the goals, making it easier to drive over larger obstacles with less risk of damage to the vehicle. Most suspensions are made to be highly flexible, allowing for the maximum amount of tire area to contact the ground, while keeping the vehicle as low as possible. Due to the conflicting nature of the dynamics and needs of rock crawling and highway driving vehicles, it is not unusual to modify a vehicle solely for off-road recreational usage.

Once a vehicle is deemed "off-road only" i.e. not driven on the street and trailered to trails or OHV parks (Off-Highway Vehicle), then the modification possibilities are endless.

Those with the financial resources can build their own rock crawler. The biggest benefit of this approach is that the owner has complete control over what their vehicle is capable of, since each part of the vehicle can be custom designed. Acquiring sponsors can help to cover some of these costs.

=== Spotters ===
A Spotter is someone who helps a driver navigate difficult or tricky portions of a track. They most commonly assist in situations where the driver is unable to see the route, or on trails with a variety of obstacles.

== See also ==
- Jeep Wrangler
- Land Rover
- Toyota Land Cruiser
- Suzuki Samurai
- International Scout
- Tuff Truck Challenge
- Mercedes Unimog
- Crawl ratio
- Off-roading
- Driveline windup
- Axle articulation
- Walking excavator
