= Crawl ratio =

Limit of the lowest low gear ratio for offroading

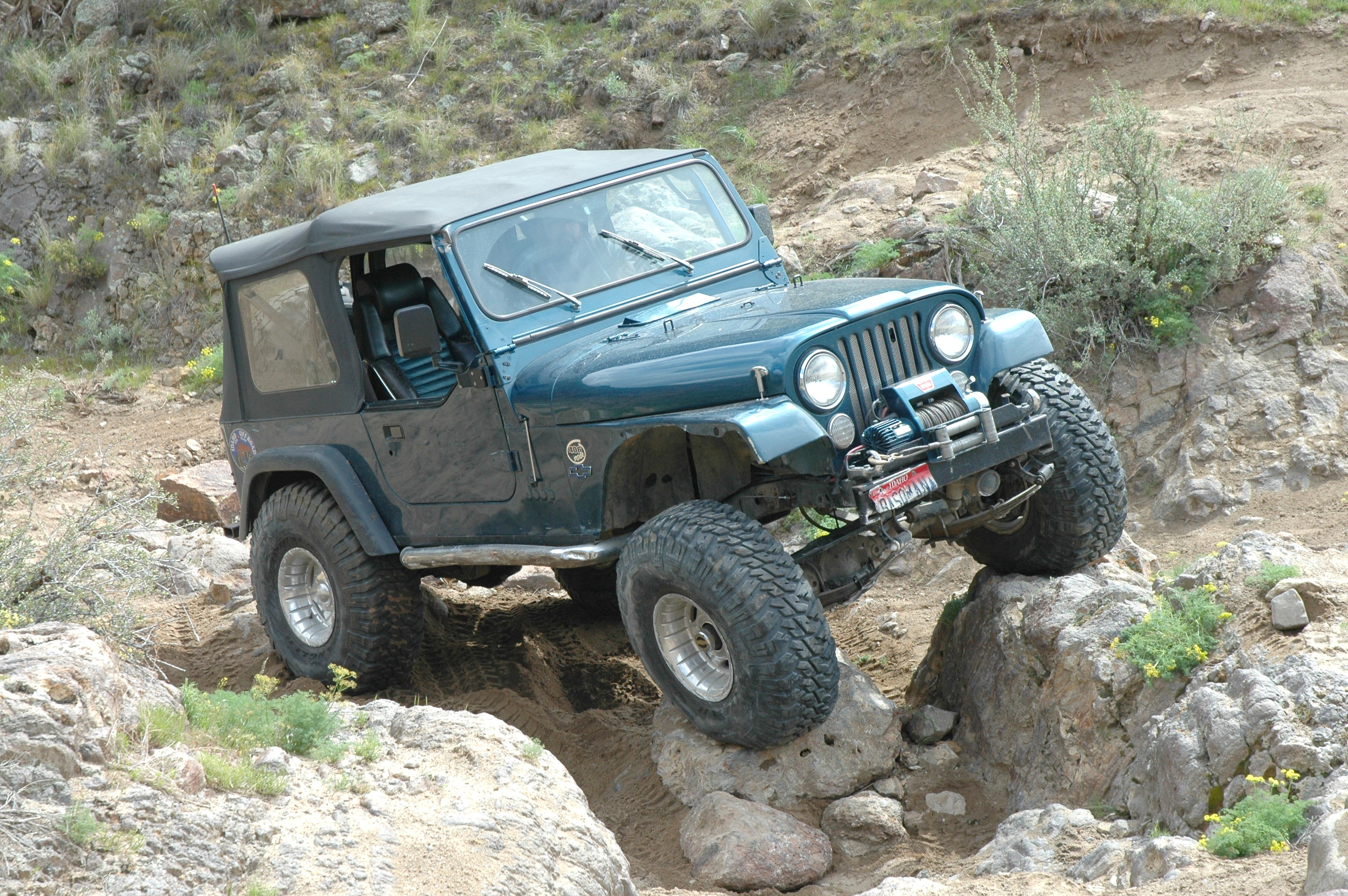
A Jeep CJ-7 rock crawling

In off-road driving, crawl ratio is the lowest overall gear ratio that a vehicle's drivetrain is capable of, i.e. the slowest vehicle speed for the same engine speed.

Crawl ratio is optimised in vehicles that are used for technical off-road driving, such as rock crawling. Although the concept is only discussed as relevant to four-wheel drive vehicles, it is still applicable as a concept to any drive layout.

== Definitions ==
Conventionally, slow-speed driving is described as being in a 'low ratio' and transfer boxes etc. are labelled as such. As a numerical ratio between speeds, the drivetrain ratio is a reduction gear and the greater this ratio the lower the gear, i.e. a more crawling ratio is a higher numerical ratio in such cases. Literally the terms thus appear contradictory, but in practice there is no confusion between the two.

For a ratio of 66, the engine makes 66 revolutions for each turn of the wheels. Or for an engine running at 2,000 rpm, 1 revolution of the wheels every two seconds.

== Speed / torque ==
Crawl ratio is a ratio of speeds, but as a mechanical reduction it is also a ratio of increasing torque. A lower crawl ratio thus gives more torque at the wheels, and better climbing performance over steep obstacles.

Use of an approriate crawl ratio allows a vehicle to be driven on a hill more easily, with the engine running at an adequate speed for smooth running and without needing the clutch to be slipped to control the speed. Rock crawling is not a fast sport and can be slowed down as much as necessary. With an adequate crawl ratio, the difficulty of rock crawling is reduced to gaining enough traction at the tyres, the vehicle then being able to climb anything that can offer enough grip. Vehicles may travel as slowly as walking pace. An extreme ratio of 122 may even allow the driver to get out and walk alongside.

Low crawl ratios have advantages for climbing steep slopes, but also for descending them. They allow use of engine braking to drive down a slope still under engine control, rather than rolling down and trying to brake. Engine control is always better, when possible, and avoids the risk of brake fade.

The need for a low crawl ratio depends on the engine's characteristics. It is less necessary with a large capacity, high torque engine. A high-revving, turbocharged four cylinder of the same nominal power will need a better ratio to achieve the same. Likewise the torque converter of an automatic transmission is also an advantage and makes the simple ratio less important. This may allow ideal ratios with automatic transmissions to be only 3/4 of those for a manual transmission.

Factory-spec vehicles may begin with an inadequate ratio but this can be improved by specifying alternate features, such as axles, on ordering. After purchase, parts swapping of the drivetrain can improve it further. Many parts use the same outer casing and mounting fittings, but with options for the internal gear ratios. This allows easy swapping of parts.

=== Reverse gear ===
Although 1st gear is the lowest gear in a manual transmission, (Note: A handful of light off-road vehicles without two ratio transfer boxes, such as the VW Synchro, have instead included an extra-low off-road crawler or 'Gelände' gear in the primary gearbox.) reverse gear is often still lower. Despite this, crawl ratio is based on forward gear, not reverse.

Reverse may also be a mechanically less strong gear in the gearbox, as it is not normally expected to carry the same loads. As such it is not up to the task of extreme rock crawling.

== Calculating crawl ratio ==
Overall crawl ratio is the product of three ratios: the gearbox or transmission, the transfer box and the axle final drive.

$$R_{Crawl} = R_{1st Gear} \times R_{Transfer Box} \times R_{Final Drive}$$

For a factory-specification mid-1980s Jeep CJ-7 (illustrated) it could be fitted with a Borg-Warner T-5 manual transmission with a 3.97:1 1st gear, Dana 300 transfer box in 2.62:1 in low ratio and Dana 30 or 44 axles with a 3.73:1 final drive ratio. The crawl ratio is thus:

$$38.8 = 3.97  \times 2.62  \times 3.73$$

The more recent 2018 Jeep Wrangler is produced in a number of models, the Sport and Sahara models, and a better equipped Rubicon model. All have further options for gear and axle ratios. They have a 5.13 (manual transmission) 1st gear, Sport and Sahara models have a 2.72:1 transfer box and come with either a 3.45:1 or 3.73:1 axle.

$$52.05 = 5.13  \times 2.72 \times 3.73$$

This gives a crawl ratio of 48.13 or 52.05, depending on axle, both of which are in an appropriate range for off-road driving. The Rubicon has a 4.01:1 transfer box low ratio and a 4.10:1 axle, giving an even more capable ratio of 84.34.

$$84.34 = 5.13  \times 4.01 \times 4.10$$

Several online calculators exist for finding crawl ratio, some of which operate with parts lists of transmissions and axles, without needing to know their precise ratios.

=== Additional factors ===
Some specially prepared off-road vehicles are fitted with a second transfer box. This gives an additional multiplication of the crawl ratio.

If the vehicle is fitted with portal axles or hub reduction gears, these too and their ratio must be included.

The differentials, limited-slip differentials and any lockers (in either the axles or the transfer case) have no effect on the crawl ratio. Overdrives have no effect either, as they are not used in the low gearbox ratios.

=== Tyres ===
Although tyre size (Note: Overall external diameter of the tyre, whatever the wheel rim size.) has an effect similar to crawl ratio, it is generally excluded from its calculation.

Larger tyres are commonly fitted to off roaders. Despite this, their effect on crawl ratio is to reduce it, making it less effective. If extreme crawl ratio is the goal, then it can be achieved by fitting smaller tyres, provided that they still have the necessary ability to cross obstacles. However the same final result can be achieved by large tyres and adjusting the mechanical ratio.

== Typical crawl ratios ==
Crawl ratios may span a range of 1:3 from lowest to highest.

Under 50	Most factory specification
50-60s	Backroads and light trail use
80s	Intermediate trail use
110-130s	Ideal for rock crawling
Over 130	Excessive, with little or no additional benefit
