= Tuff Truck Challenge =

The Tuff Truck Challenge is an offroad 4x4 rock crawling event held since 2001. The event has always been held at a private property/farming land in Milbrodale in the Hunter Valley of NSW, Australia.

The event runs for 3 days with spectators camping. The event was known for disorderly conduct from spectators. It was traditionally held near or on Easter break, however the event has been moved to a weekend in September from 2019.

Over the weekend teams, made up of a driver and navigator, must attempt to compete a number of courses marked out through rocks, trees and soil. Teams can gain points the further they progress through the course, but lose points for a variety of errors (such as, using reverse gear, winching, touching the bunting or cones, etc.). Each course has a time limit but often vehicles breakdown, rollover or get stuck midway before they are able to complete the course. While there is a set time limit to complete the course, there is no points advantage for finishing the course in a quicker time - it's not a race and making it so would change the categorisation of the event requiring different safety protections for the competitors, staff and spectators. As the event is about low-speed technical crawling, spectators can get relatively close to the course with a high degree of safety.

== History ==
Initially, competing vehicles were required to be road-worth and registered with their various state's motor registries. Over the years this rule was removed as vehicles became modified beyond what was legally allowed on public roads to complete the harder course layouts. Also, road rules would not have allowed the roll-cage safety requirements that are now in the rules. Vehicles must still be based on original road-going vehicles and contain a portion of its original chassis and visual look.

The event is currently run by previous multi-time winner, Peter Antunac through his events company 'Tuff Events & Promotions Australia Pty Ltd'. He took over the event management in 2010 after winning the event in his highly modified Toyota Landcruiser the year before. The event was originally developed by the On All 4s 4WD Club in 2001, however, after the 2002 event, the club no longer had the resources to run it. A group of members from the Suzuki 4WD Club of NSW and ACT formed Tuff Events and Promotions Pty Ltd and ran the event from 2005 until 2009.

In 2015, the event featured on Australian sport television program RPM in a segment with Kate Peck. In the same year, the same team behind the event started a 2nd event called "King of the Hunter" as the "under license" version of King of the Hammers from America. Event Director Peter Antunac competed in the ULTRA4 class winning all 4 races.

=== Event statistics ===
Year	Dates	Number of Teams	Winner
2019	September	57	LaserNut Racing (Jesse Haines)
2018	April	62	Just Customs (Michael Justice)
2017	April	67	Just Customs (Michael Justice)
2016	April	68	Just Customs (Michael Justice)
2015	April	75	OPW (David Camp)
2014	March	67	Just Customs (Michael Justice)
2013	April	61	Rock Rash Racing (David Camp)
2012	March	59	Tough Dog (Mal Van Ysseldyk)
2011	April	59	Rock Rash Racing (David Camp)
2010	March	38	Team Pirate (Daniel Pitt)
2009	March	42	OPW (Peter Antunac)
2008	April	40	Evolution (Phill Noble)
2007	March	42	Total Care 4WD / ABT Racing (Mal Van Ysseldyk)
2006	April	37	OPW (Peter Antunac)
2005	April	33	OPW (Peter Antunac)
2002	April	30	Dobbin Engineering (Glen Dobbin)
2001	April	32	Sporty 40 (Terry Cockayne)
