= The Dreaming =

Sacred era in Australian Aboriginal mythology

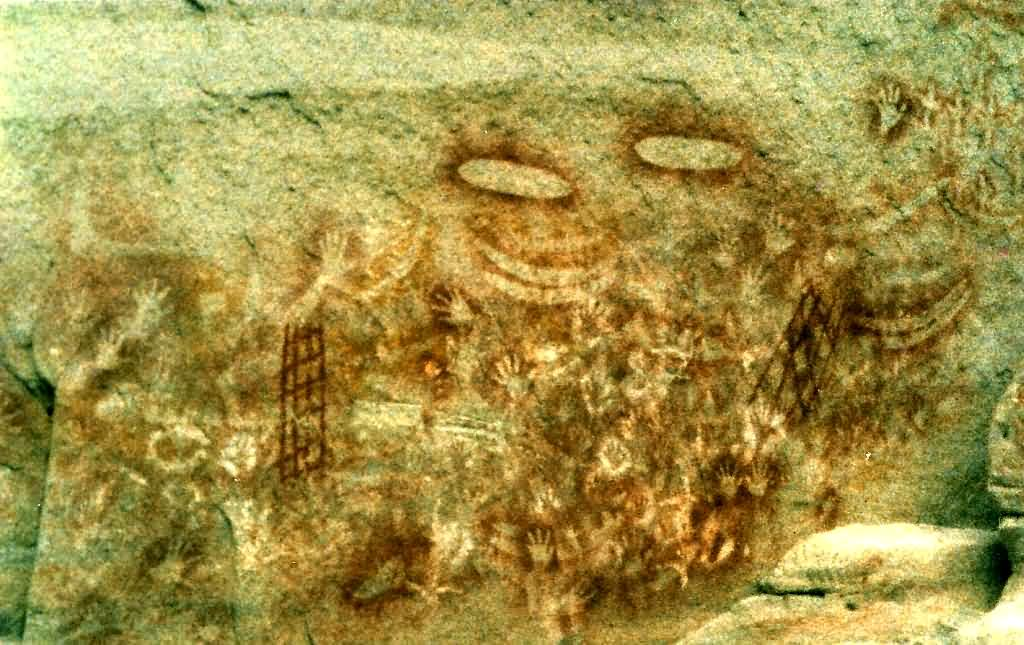
Stencil art at Carnarvon Gorge. The collective works of the Bidjara, Karingbal (or Garingbal), Ghungalu (or Gangulu), Gunggari, Gayiri (or Kairi), Nguri, Gungabula, Yiman, Wadja, Kara Kara, and Butchulla peoples (Aboriginal groups that have created the myriad of stencil art sites that exist at Carnarvon Gorge) encompass many critical aspects of early and recent Aboriginal society. They include, but are not limited to, insights on memorial practices, appeals to totemic ancestors or varying interpretative records of Dreaming stories, and provide direct documentation on the daily lives of said groups ~19,500–3,500 years ago.

The Dreaming (also The Dreamtime or Dreamtime) is a term devised by early anthropologists to refer to a religio-cultural worldview attributed to Australian Aboriginal mythology. It was originally used by Francis Gillen, adopted by his colleague Walter Baldwin Spencer, and thereafter popularised by A. P. Elkin, who later revised his views.

The Dreaming is used to represent Aboriginal concepts of what anthropologist W.E.H. Stanner called "everywhen", during which the land was inhabited and created by ancestral figures, often of heroic proportions or with supernatural abilities. The meaning and significance of specific places and creatures are wedded to their origin in the Dreaming, and certain locations have a distinct potency, such as Uluru (Ayers Rock), Kata Tjuta (Mt. Olga), Wollumbin, and Baiame Cave.

The Dreaming is also used as a term for a system of totemic symbols, so that an Aboriginal person may own a specific Dreaming such as a kangaroo Dreaming, a honey ant Dreaming, or any combination of Dreamings pertinent to their country. This is because in the Dreaming an individual's entire ancestry exists as one single continuing cycle, culminating in the idea that all worldly knowledge is accumulated through one's ancestors. As such, The Dreaming lays down the patterns of life for Aboriginal people.

== Etymology and translation disputes ==
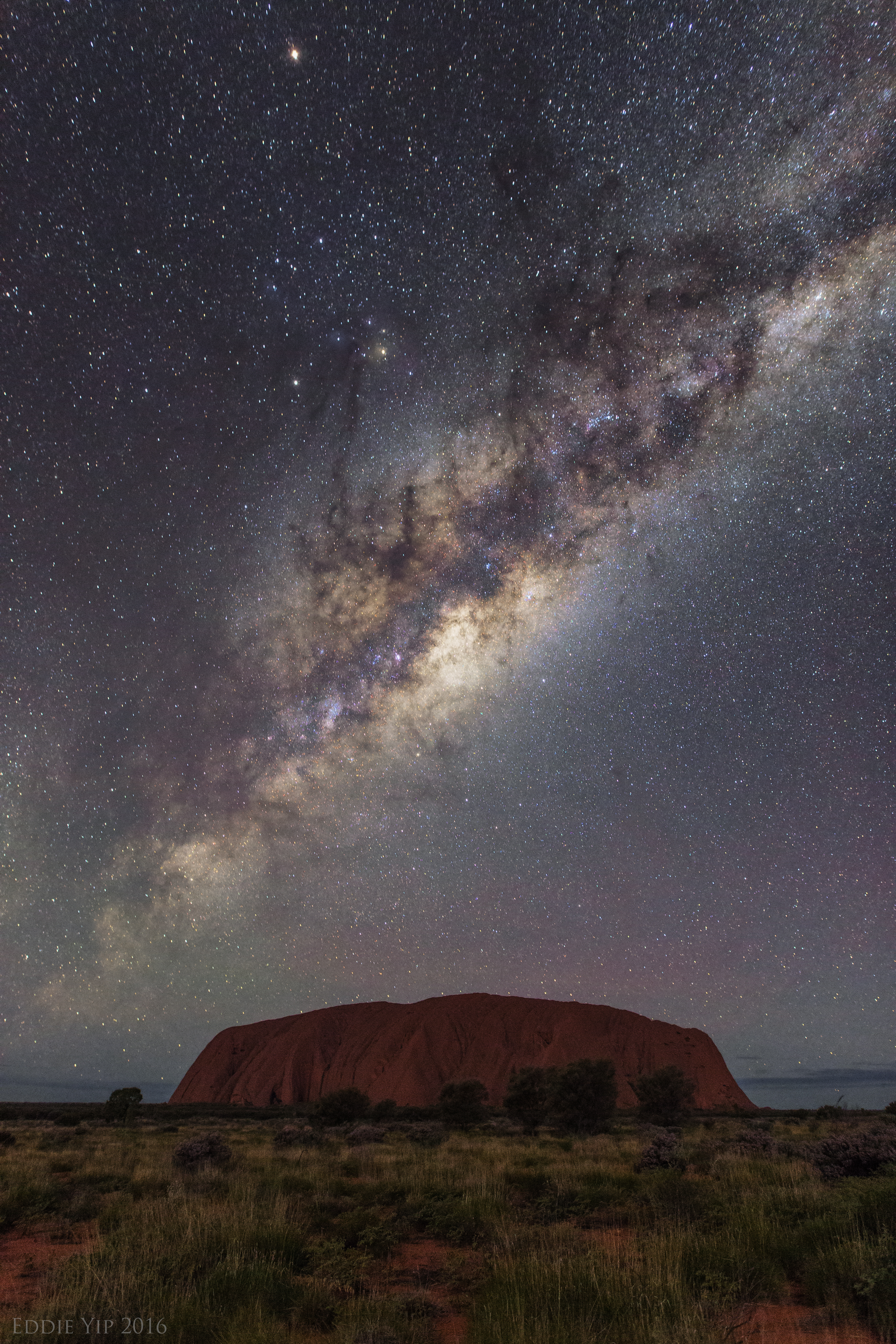
The Milky Way over Uluru. In Carl Strehlow's 1908 study known as Die Aranda, the Arrente people of Central Australia near Uluru, envisioned the Milky way as a free flowing "river of blood", a celestial waterway into the sky realm of the Dreamtime that leads directly to the dwelling of Altjira (an eternal Creator Deity). Do note that while Strehlow's views provided an early, detailed account of Arrente cosmology; it is often compounded with other early, controversial interpretation of Aboriginal spirituality.

=== Early challenges to the "Dreamtime" ===
Early doubts about the precision of Spencer and Gillen's English gloss were expressed by the German Lutheran pastor and missionary Carl Strehlow in his 1908 book Die Aranda (The Arrernte). He noted that his Arrernte contacts explained altjira (also spelled alchera), whose etymology was unknown, as an eternal being who had no beginning. In the Upper Arrernte language the proper verb for "to dream" was altjirerama, literally "to see God". Strehlow theorised that the noun is the somewhat rare word altjirrinja, to which Spencer and Gillen gave a corrupted transcription and a false etymology. "The native," Strehlow concluded, "knows nothing of 'dreamtime' as a designation of a certain period of their history." (Note: The Strehlows' informant, Moses (Tjalkabota), was a convert to Christianity, and the adoption of his interpretation suffered from a methodological error, according to Barry Hill, since his conversion made his views on pre-contact beliefs unreliable.)

Strehlow gives Altjira or Altjira mara (mara meaning "good") as the Arrernte word for the eternal creator of the world and humankind. Strehlow describes him as a tall, strong man with red skin, long fair hair, and emu legs, with many red-skinned wives (with dog legs) and children.

In Strehlow's account, Altjira lives in the sky (which is a body of land through which runs the Milky Way, a river).

=== Missionary influence and the concept of God ===
However, by the time Strehlow was writing the majority of his Aboriginal contacts had been converts to Christianity for decades. Critics such as Sam Gill suggested that Altjira had been used by missionaries from the Hermannsburg Institute as a word for the Christian God in order to fill in a lexical gap in Arrernte language. This process is said to have shifted the original traditional meaning of the word so as to fit Christian theology, implying that Strehlow's usage may be unsuited for sourcing.

=== Spencer's rebuttal and modern academic views ===
In 1926 Spencer conducted a field study to challenge Strehlow's conclusion about Altjira and the implied criticism of Gillen and Spencer's original work. Spencer found attestations of altjira from the 1890s that used the word to mean "associated with past times" or "eternal", not "god".

Academic Sam Gill finds Strehlow's use of Altjira ambiguous, sometimes describing a supreme being and sometimes describing a totem being, but not necessarily a supreme one. He attributes the clash partly to Spencer's cultural evolutionist beliefs that Aboriginal people were at a pre-religion "stage of development (and thus could not believe in a supreme being)", while Strehlow as a Christian missionary found presence of belief in the divine a useful entry point for proselytising.

Linguist David Campbell Moore is critical of Spencer and Gillen's "Dreamtime" translation, concluding:

"Dreamtime" was a mistranslation based on an etymological connection between "a dream" and "Altjira", which held only over a limited geographical domain. There was some semantic relationship between "Altjira" and "a dream", but to imagine that the latter captures the essence of "Altjira" is an illusion.

— David Campbell Moore, Altjira, Dream and God

=== Other terms among Aboriginal groups ===
The complex of religious beliefs encapsulated by the Dreaming is also called:

- Ngarrankarni or Ngarrarngkarni by the Gija people
- Jukurrpa or Tjukurpa/Tjukurrpa by the Warlpiri people and in the Pitjantjatjara dialect
- Ungud or Wungud by the Ngarinyin people
- Manguny in the language Martu Wangka
- Wongar in North-East Arnhem Land
- Daramoolen in Ngunnawal language and Ngarigo language
- Nura in the Dharug language
- Nyitting in the Noongar language
- Many Aboriginal Australians also refer to the world-creation time as "The Dreamtime", or just "Dreamtime"

== Translation debates and meaning ==
Dreamtime and similar terms are based on a rendition of the Arandic word alcheringa, used by the Arrernte (Aranda, Arunta) people of Central Australia. However, there are also arguments these English-language terms are based on a misunderstanding or mistranslation. Some scholars suggest that the word's meaning is closer to "eternal, uncreated".

Anthropologist William Stanner said the concept was "best" understood by non-Aboriginal people as "a complex of meanings". Stanner famously termed this "Everywhen", representing the Aboriginal concept that the Dreaming is not a "far distant past", but a timeless reality where the past, present, and future coexist in an omnipotently simultaneous manner.

Some Aboriginal groups find the word "Dreaming" inappropriate because it implies something non-real, whereas the concept is a lived daily reality. By the 1990s, Dreaming had entered popular culture, based on idealized or highly fictionalized conceptions of Australian mythology. Since the 1970s, Dreaming has also returned from academic usage via popular culture and tourism and is now ubiquitous in the English vocabulary of Aboriginal Australians in a kind of "self-fulfilling academic prophecy".

The station-master, magistrate, and amateur ethnographer Francis Gillen first used the terms in an ethnographical report in 1896. Along with Walter Baldwin Spencer, Gillen published a major work, Native Tribes of Central Australia, in 1899. In that work, they spoke of the Alcheringa as "the name applied to the far distant past with which the earliest traditions of the tribe deal". Five years later, in their Northern Tribes of Central Australia, they gloss the far distant age as "the dream times", link it to the word alcheri meaning "dream", and affirm that the term is current also among the Kaytetye and Anmatyerr.

In English, anthropologists have variously translated words normally understood to mean Dreaming or Dreamtime in a variety of other ways, including:

- "Everywhen"
- "world-dawn"
- "ancestral past"
- "ancestral present"
- "ancestral now" (satirically)
- "unfixed in time"
- "abiding events"
- "abiding law"

Most translations of the Dreaming into other languages are based on the translation of the word dream. Examples include Espaces de rêves in French ("dream spaces") and Snivanje in Croatian (a gerund derived from the verb for "to dream").

The concept of the Dreaming is argued to be inadequately explained by English terms, and can be a challenging concept in itself to explain to others not familiar with subject matter. It has been described as "an all-embracing concept that provides rules for living, a moral code, as well as rules for interacting with the natural environment ... [it] provides for a total, integrated way of life ... a lived daily reality". It embraces past, present and future in high reverence.

Another definition suggests that Dreaming represents "the relationship between people, plants, animals and the physical features of the land; the knowledge of how these relationships came to be, what they mean and how they need to be maintained in daily life and in ceremony." According to Simon Wright, "Jukurrpa" has an expansive meaning for Warlpiri people, encompassing their own law and related cultural knowledge systems, along with what non-Indigenous people refer to as "dreaming."

A dreaming is often associated with a particular place, and may also belong to specific ages, gender or skin groups. Dreaming's may be represented in artworks; for example, "Pikilyi Jukurrpa" by Theo (Faye) Nangala represents the Dreaming of Pikilyi (Vaughan Springs) in the Northern Territory, and belongs to the Japanangka/Nanpanangka and Japangardi/Napanangka skin groups.

== Beliefs ==
The Dreaming operates as a functional database for environmental stewardship. For the Yolngu people of Arnhem Land, Songlines serve as high-resolution topographical maps, containing vital data on seasonal water sources and "fire-stick farming" (controlled burning) protocols. These traditional narratives are currently integrated into "Two-Way" land management programs, where indigenous ecological knowledge is applied alongside Western climate science to mitigate bushfire risks and manage biodiversity.

The Dreaming serves as a contemporary legal code, often referred to as The Law. (or Malak) Among groups such as the Pitjantjatjara, ancestral narratives dictate "skin groups" and kinship systems that regulate marriage, social obligations, and dispute resolution. This customary law often functions as a primary framework for social cohesion in remote communities, providing a culturally specific alternative or supplement to the Australian judicial system.

A central tenet of Dreaming philosophy is the rejection of land as a commodity in favour of land as a "kin relation". Among the Noongar of Western Australia, the landscape is regarded as a sentient subject possessing agency and memory. This is exemplified in the practice of "Singing to Country", a protocol intended to maintain the spiritual and physical health of the environment. In modern urban planning, these philosophies necessitate consultation with Traditional Owners to ensure developments do not disrupt the "spiritual metabolism" of sites associated with beings like the Waugal (Rainbow Serpent).

=== Creation ===
Creation is believed to be the work of culture heroes who travelled across a formless land, creating sacred sites and significant places of interest in their travels.

The concept of a life force in creation is also often associated with sacred sites, and ceremonies performed at such sites "are a re-creation of the events which created the site during The Dreaming". The ceremony helps the life force at the site to remain active and to keep creating new life: if not performed, new life cannot be created.

=== Physical manifestation of entities ===
Some of the ancestors or spirit beings inhabiting the Dreamtime become one with parts of the landscape, such as rocks or trees.

For example, the Anangu people believe that features of Uluru (Ayers Rock) are the physical remains of ancestral Dreamtime beings, such as the carpet-snake people (Kuniya) who fought or lived there during the Dreaming, with specific rock holes marking the sites of occurrences such as their battles with the Liru (venomous snake people).

In another example, the Gaagudju people of Arnhemland, for whom Kakadu National Park is named; believe that the sandstone escarpment that dominates the park's landscape was created in the Dreamtime when Ginga (the crocodile-man) was badly burned during a ceremony and jumped into the water to save himself.

Narratives cover many themes and topics, including the creation of sacred places, land, people, animals, plants, law, and custom.

== Differences between cultures ==
The grouping of all Aboriginal peoples' beliefs and culture around the Dreaming together can only give a generalized view which fails to account for substantial distinctions between languages and indigenous groups. The Australian Institute of Aboriginal and Torres Strait Islander Studies cites 250 distinct language groups, each with variation in beliefs to one another.

Dreaming stories vary across Australia, frequently sharing variations on the same theme.

For example, stories of how the sun was made differ among the Aboriginal groups of New South Wales (the Gamilaraay, Wiradjuri, Euahlayi, Ngiyaampaa, Gumbaynggirr, Bundjalung, Eora, and Yuin nations) compared to those of Western Australia (Noongar sub-groups like the Wadandi and Bibbulmun, etc.).

In the Gamilaraay and Wiradjuri traditions of New South Wales, the sun began as a celestial accident born from a rivalry between the Emu and the Brolga (a graceful, tall, grey bird). During a fierce argument on the plains, the Brolga snatched a massive emu egg from a nest and hurled it toward the sky spirits. The egg struck a heap of kindling, causing the yolk to burst into a brilliant flame that illuminated the world for the first time. Moved by the beauty of the light, the spirits decided to rekindle this fire daily, appointing the Kookaburra to wake the world with its laughter each dawn so no one would miss the sun's return.

In the Noongar traditions of Western Australia, the sun is personified as Ngaangk, a maternal spirit who travels across the sky as a torch-bearer. Each morning, she rises in the east carrying a smoldering Banksia cone, echoing the traditional practice of Aboriginal women who carried "walking fires" between campsites. As she moves toward the western horizon, she provides the earth with warmth and life before traveling through a subterranean tunnel at night to return to her starting point. In this perspective, the sun is not a permanent fixture but a continuous act of care and a daily renewal of fire for the People.

=== Non-Aboriginal ===
The Dreaming is a philosophy which has similarities to practice in other cultures found across the globe. Tibetan monks practice a meditation that leads them to an out of body experience similar to what is described in the dreaming. Shamanism and Post Modernism have valued hallucinogenic-induced stupors that lead to a mailable "Dream World" experience. These other cultures have "dreaming" as a shared cultural experience.

== Aboriginal groups with notable Dreamtime interpretative variation ==
- Anmatyerr
- Arrernte
- Bidjara
- Butchulla
- Dharug
- Gaagudju
- Gija
- Jawoyn
- Kaytetye
- Luritja
- Martu
- Ngarinyin
- Ngunnawal
- Ngarigo
- Noongar
- Pintupi
- Pitjantjatjara
- Warlpiri
- Yankunytjatjara

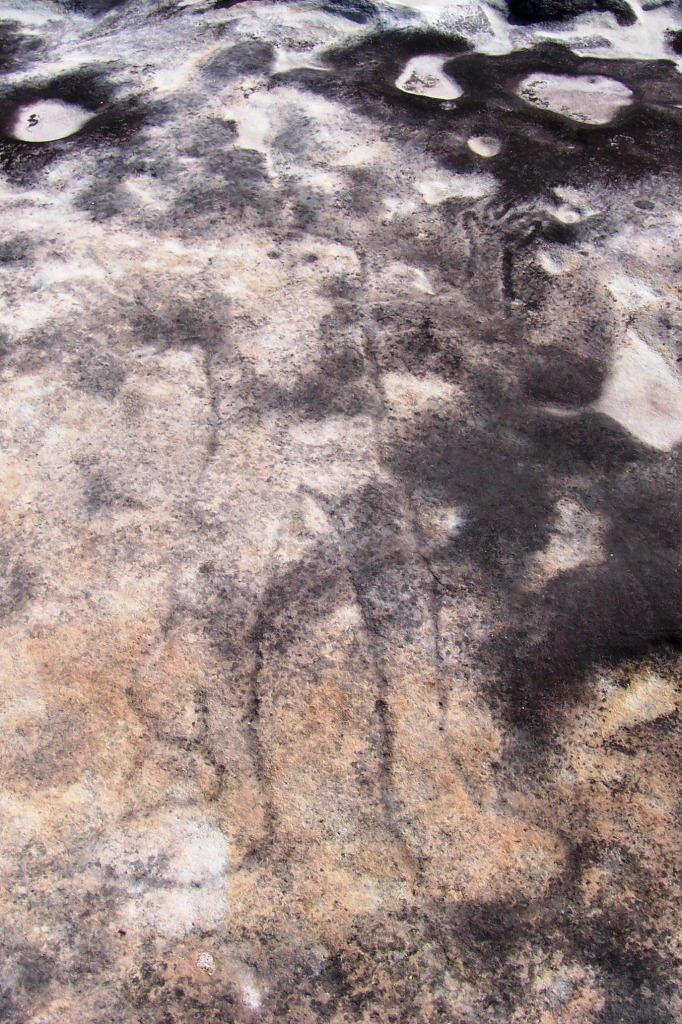
Ku-ring-gai Chase-petroglyph, depicting Baiame, the Creator God and Sky Father, in the dreaming of several Aboriginal language groups. The petroglyph is carved into Hawkesbury Sandstone on the Waratah Track, and is approximately 1.7 meters (5.6 feet) long. Unique artistic features of the petroglyph include a significantly swollen leg and the complete absence of a neck.

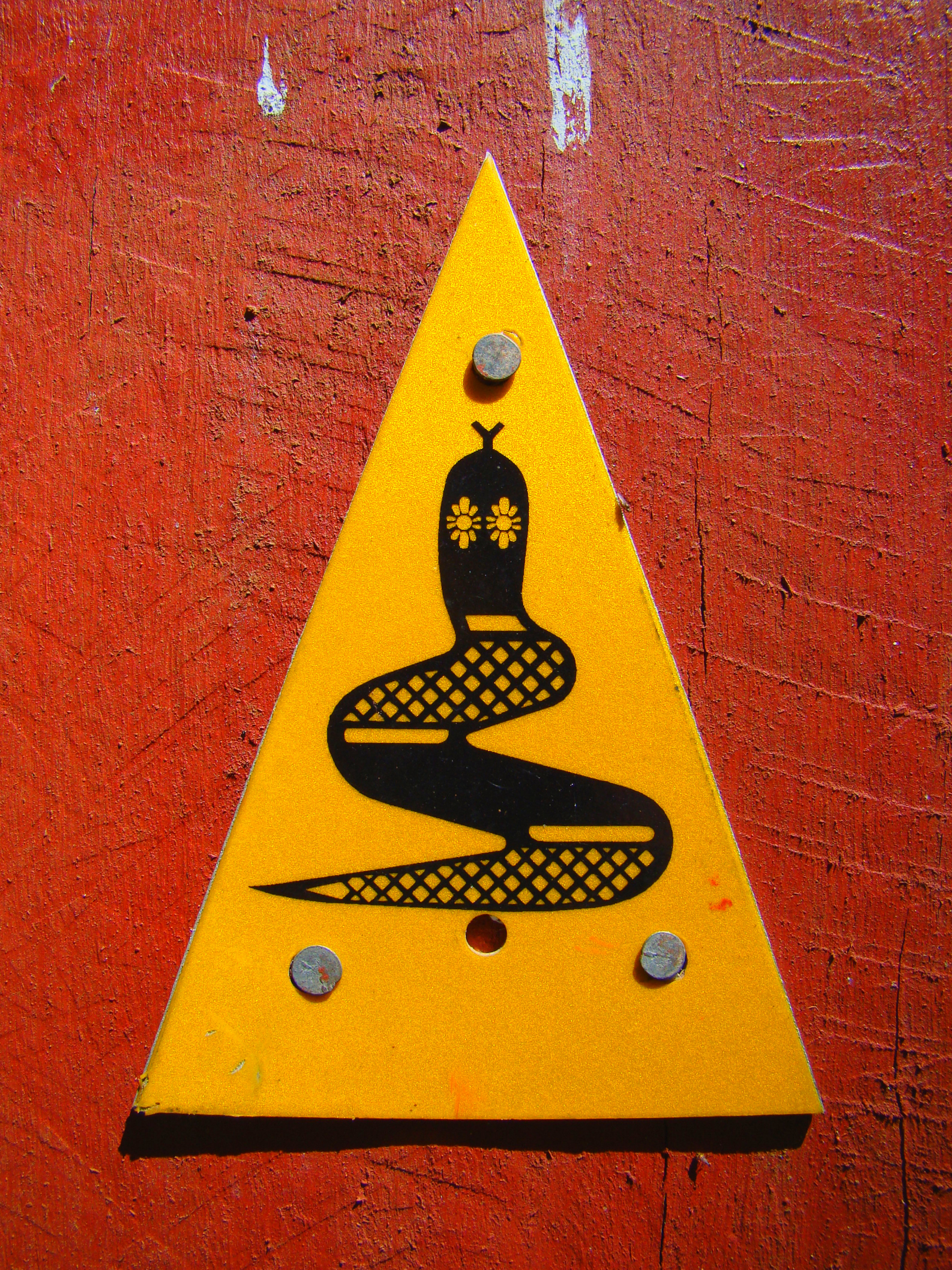
Waugals (yellow triangles with a black snake in the centre) are the official Bibbulmun Track trailmarkers between Kalamunda and Albany in Western Australia. The Waugal symbol was adopted in 1987/88 during a major overhaul of the Track by the Department of Conservation and Land Management (CALM). The symbol was deemed appropriate to recognize the rich indigenous (Noongar) history of the region. The Noongar believe that the Waugal meandered across the land, carving out the Swan River (Derbal Yerrigan) and the Canning River (Djarlgarro Beelier) on its journey to the ocean (likely the Indian ocean). It is represented by the Darling scarp. The Darling Scarp is a "320 kilometer long fault formed escarpment" running north to south and forming the eastern edge of the Swan Coastal Plain in Western Australia. It is believed to represent the body of a resting Waugal. Its scales are said to have become forests, while its droppings are noted to be represented by large piles of rock. In Noongar tradition, the Waugal is a guardian of fresh water. When the water in a river is dark and murky, it is believed that the Waugal is swimming, and people should not enter the water.

== See also ==
- Aboriginal mythology
  - Rainbow Serpent
  - Tjilbruke
- Dreaming (Australian Aboriginal art)
- Festival of the Dreaming, an arts festival that ran from 1997 until 2012

== Sources ==
- "Dreamtime". EBSCO. 2022. Archived from the original on 31 December 2025.
- Elkin, Adolphus Peter (1956) [1938]. The Australian Aborigines: How to Understand Them (3rd ed.). Angus & Robertson – via Internet Archive.
- Berndt, Ronald M. (2 June 2026). "Australian Aboriginal Peoples". Encyclopædia Britannica. Archived from the original on 18 May 2026.
- "The Dreaming: Sacred sites". Working with Indigenous Australians.
- Bates, Daisy (1996). Aboriginal Perth and Bibbulmun biographies and legends. Hesperion Press. ISBN 978-0-85905-135-4.
- Bellah, Robert N. (2013) [First published 1970]. "Religious Evolution". In Eisenstadt, S.N. (ed.). Readings in Social Evolution and Development. Elsevier. pp. 211–244. ISBN 978-1-483-13786-5.
- "Catapult Wall Art: Pikilyi Jukurrpa". Catapult Design. Archived from the original on 18 March 2021.
- Charlesworth, Max (2017). "Introduction". In Charlesworth, Max; Dussart, Françoise; Morphy, Howard (eds.). Religion In Aboriginal Australia: An Anthology. Vitality of Indigenous Religions. Routledge. ISBN 978-1-351-96127-1.
- Gill, Sam D. (1998). Storytracking: Texts, Stories & Histories in Central Australia. Oxford University Press. pp. 93–103. ISBN 978-0-19-511587-1.
- Hill, Barry (2003). Broken Song: T G H Strehlow and Aboriginal Possession. Knopf-Random House. ISBN 978-1-742-74940-2.
- "Indigenous Australians: Aboriginal and Torres Strait Islander people". AIATSIS. 12 July 2020.
- Isaacs, Jennifier (1980). Australian Dreaming: 40,000 Years of Aboriginal History. Sydney: Lansdowne Press. ISBN 0-7018-1330-X.
- James, Diana (2015). "Tjukurpa Time". In McGrath, Ann; Jebb, Mary Anne (eds.). Long History, Deep Time: Deepening Histories of Place. Australian National University Press. pp. 33–46. ISBN 9781--925-02253-7.
- "Jukurrpa". Central Art.
- "Jukurrpa". National Museum of Australia.
- Korff, Jens (8 February 2019). "What is the 'Dreamtime' or the 'Dreaming'?". Creative Spirits.
- Lawlor, Robert (1991). Voices of the First Day: Awakening in the Aboriginal dreamtime. Rochester, Vermont: Inner Traditions International. ISBN 0-89281-355-5.
- di Leonardo, Micaela (2000). Exotics at Home: Anthropologies, Others, and American Modernity. University of Chicago Press. p. 377 n.42. ISBN 978-0-226-47264-5.("Into the Crystal Dreamtime", promotional pamphlet, late 1980s; "Crystal Woman: isters of the Dreamtime" 1987; p. 36:"the prescriptive New Age genre, which sells one-hundred-proof ethnological antimodernism without overmuch worry about bothersome ethnographic facts")
- Marett, Allan (2005). Songs, Dreamings, and Ghosts: The Wangga of North Australia. Middletown, Connecticut: Wesleyan University Press. p. 1. ISBN 978-0-8195-6618-8.
- Moore, David (1 January 2016). Altjira, Dream and God. Routledge, Taylor & Francis. pp. 85–108. ISBN 978-1-4724-4383-0 – via ResearchGate.
- "Nelson Jagamara, Michael; Metafisica Australe". QAGOMA Collection Online Beta. Government of Queensland. Archived from the original on 2 April 2021. "Simon Wright, Artlines, no.2, 2018, pp.52–3."
- Nicholls, Christine Judith (22 January 2014a). "'Dreamtime' and 'The Dreaming': An introduction". The Conversation.
- Nicholls, Christine Judith (28 January 2014c). "'Dreamtime' and 'The Dreaming': Who dreamed up these terms?". The Conversation.
- Nicholls, Christine Judith (5 February 2014b). "'Dreamings' and dreaming narratives: What's the relationship?". The Conversation.
- Povinelli, Elizabeth A. (2002). The Cunning of Recognition: Indigenous Alterities and the Making of Australian Multiculturalism. Durham, North Carolina: Duke University Press. p. 200. ISBN 978-0-8223-2868-1 – via Internet Archive.
- Price-Williams, Douglas (1987). "The waking dream in ethnographic perspective". In Tedlock, Barbara (ed.). Dreaming: Anthropological and Psychological Interpretations. Cambridge University Press. pp. 246–262. ISBN 978-0-521-34004-5 – via Internet Archive.
- Price-Williams, Douglas (2016). "Altjira, Dream and God". In Cox, James L.; Possamai, Adam (eds.). Religion and non-religion among Australian Aboriginal Peoples. Routledge. pp. 85–108. ISBN 978-1-317-06795-5.
- Smith, Jeff. Bone #46, Tenth Anniversary. Self-published. Bone-A–Fides section.
- Spencer, Baldwin; Gillen, F. J. (1899). The Native Tribes of Central Australia. Macmillan & Co – via Internet Archive.
- Spencer, Baldwin; Gillen, F. J. (1904). The northern tribes of central Australia. Macmillan & Co – via Internet Archive.
- "Spirituality". Noongar Culture.
- Stanner, Bill (1979). White Man Got No Dreaming: Essays 1938–1973. Canberra: Australian National University Press. ISBN 978-0-7081-1802-3.
- Stanner, W. H. (1968). After The Dreaming. Boyer Lecture Series. ABC.
- Swain, Tony (1993). A Place for Strangers: Towards a History of Australian Aboriginal Being. Cambridge University Press. ISBN 978-0-521-44691-4.
- Vanni, Maurizio; Pedretti, Carlo (2005). Giuliano Ghelli. Le vie del tempo (in Italian, English, and German). Poggibonsi (province of Siena), Italy: Carlo Cambi Editore. pp. 18, 70. ISBN 88-88482-41-5. "Ghelli's work appears as an authentic initiatory experience, with important ordeals to overcome. No Aboriginal boy can be considered a man, nor can an Aboriginal girl marry, until he or she has overcome all the initiatory rituals. One of these, perhaps the most feared, is the interpretation of symbols in paintings associated with Dreamtime."
- Voigt, Anna; Drury, Neville (1997). Wisdom of the Earth: the living legacy of the Aboriginal dreamtime. East Roseville, NSW: Simon & Schuster. ISBN 978-0-7318-0569-3.
- Walsh, G. L. (1979). "Mutilated hands or signal stencils? A consideration of irregular hand stencils from Central Queensland" (PDF). Australian Archaeology. 9 (9): 33–41. doi:10.1080/03122417.1979.12093358. hdl:2328/708. Archived from the original (PDF) on 30 July 2020.
- Wolf, Fred Alan (1994). The Dreaming Universe: a mind-expanding journey into the realm where psyche and physics meet. New York: Simon & Schuster. ISBN 0-671-74946-3.
- Wolfe, Patrick (1997). "Should the Subaltern Dream? "Australian Aborigines" and the Problem of Ethnographic Ventriloquism". In Humphreys, Sarah C. (ed.). Cultures of Scholarship. University of Michigan Press. pp. 57–96. ISBN 978-0-472-06654-4 – via Internet Archive.
