= Milbrodale, New South Wales =

Coordinates: 32°45′S 151°06′E

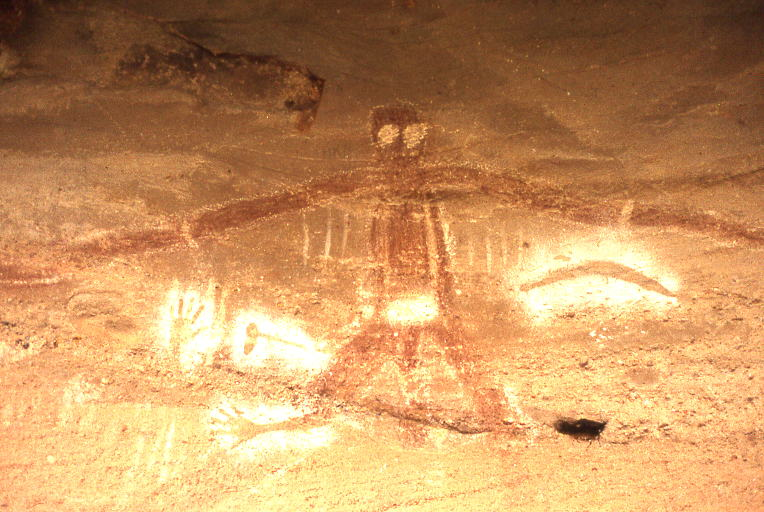
Main figure, Baiame Cave

Milbrodale is a locality in the Hunter Region of New South Wales, Australia consisting of a small public school and surrounding farming properties. It is in the local government area of Singleton Council.

== Description ==
Milbrodale is set in a rural area 23 kilometres south of Singleton. To the north of Milbrodale is Darkey Creek, while to the east is Wollombi Brook. To the west is the rugged sandstone wilderness of the Wollemi National Park, the second-largest national park in New South Wales. Milbrodale is approximately twenty-nine kilometres from Singleton and seventy-eight kilometres from the city of Newcastle.

== History ==
Milbrodale was first established by the Rev. Richard Hill in 1832. Hill had arrived from England to assist with the ministering of the colony at Sydney, and worked as assistant to the minister at St Philip's Church in Sydney. Later, he became minister at St James's Church, Sydney (designed by Francis Greenway). Eventually, Governor Lachlan Macquarie gave him a land grant of 1,200 acres (4.9 km^{2}) in the Hunter Valley. After journeying along a track that was the beginning of the Great North Road, Hill arrived in the Hunter Valley and built a stone house at the junction of Wollombi Brook and Parsons Creek. He named his property Milbro Dale, after his mother (her name had been Marlborough, which was commonly shortened to Milbro). Hill died in 1836 and his wife Phoebe Sapphira returned to Sydney after selling the farm. The property changed hands several times over the years but eventually deteriorated. Sadly the original Milbrodale stone house was dismantled and sold off in 1978.

The village grew as time went by, but the local children had to go to school at the nearby village of Bulga, transported by a horse and cart service subsidised by the Government. A public school was finally opened at Milbrodale in 1921 on a 5-acre (20,000 m^{2}) property obtained by Government grant.

== Aboriginal site ==
The most significant feature of Milbrodale is an eighty-hectare site containing rock shelters with many signs of Aboriginal occupation. Excavations carried out by staff from the Australian Museum, Sydney, produced much evidence of the "Small Tool Phase" of Aboriginal history. One of the main features is a rock shelter popularly known as Baiame Cave, which contains a group of Aboriginal paintings. The central figure is a large male figure that may represent Baiame, the Sky Father. The site is on private property.

The cave is listed on the New South Wales Heritage Register.

== Gallery ==
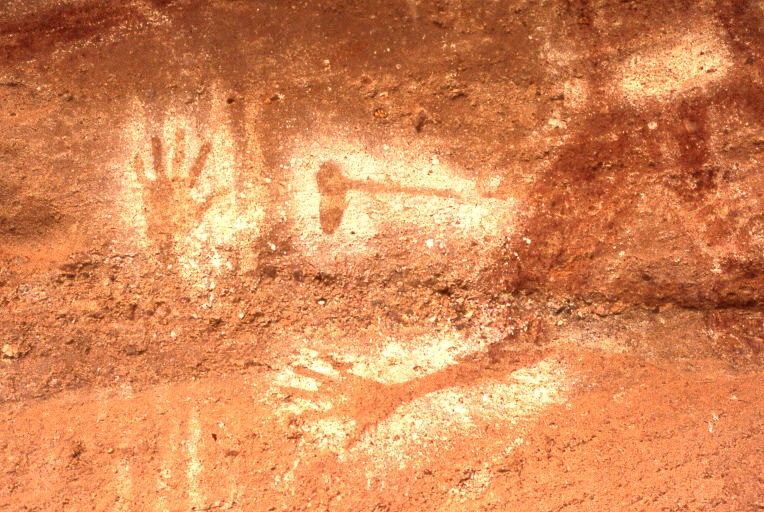
Detail, Baiame Cave

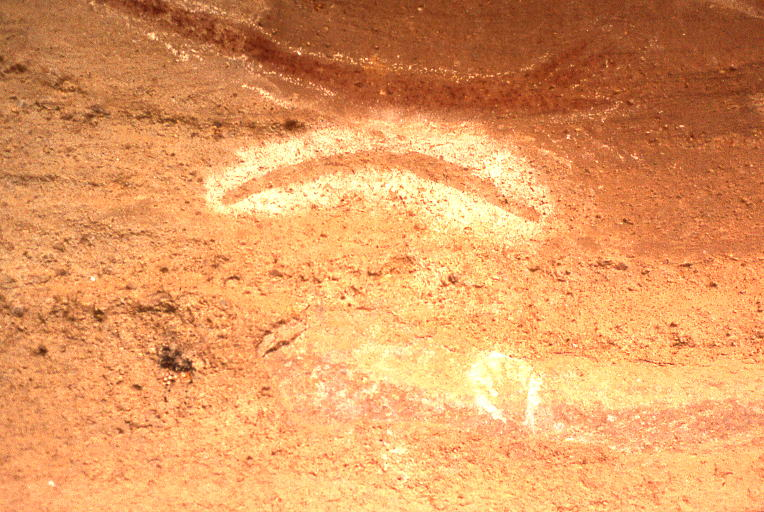
Detail, Baiame Cave

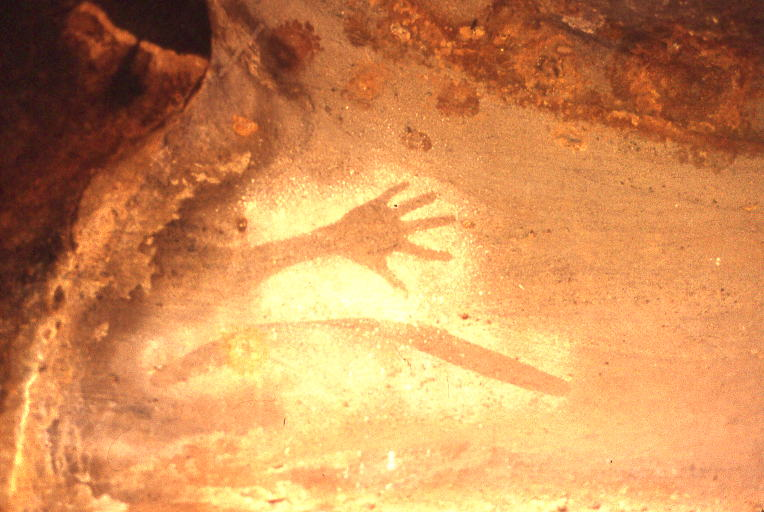
Detail, Baiame Cave

== See also ==
- Aboriginal sites of New South Wales
- Great North Road, Australia
- Tuff Truck Challenge
