= Baiame Cave =

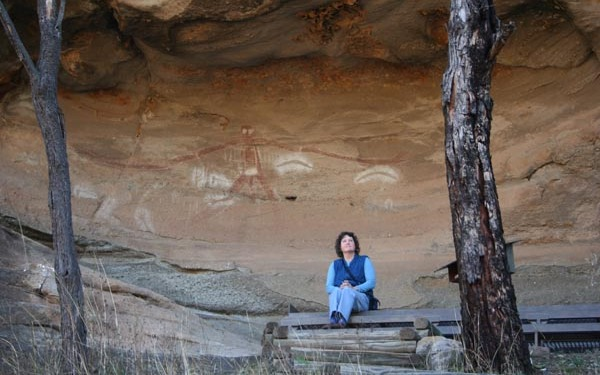
- Baiame Cave with rock art, 2007

- Location within New South Wales Location within Australia
- 32.7053°S 150.9942°E
- Location: Milbrodale, Singleton Council, New South Wales, Australia

Site notes
- Owner: Owner of land where Baiame Cave is situated

New South Wales Heritage Register
- Official name: Baiame Cave; Milbrodale Man; Baiame’s Cave; Creator Cave; Dhurramulan; Going; Wabooee; Baiamai; Biami; Baimae; Biamie; Biaime; Byarmie; Byarme;
- Type: state heritage (archaeological-terrestrial)
- Designated: 31 July 2015
- Reference no.: 1942
- Type: Art site
- Category: Aboriginal

Baiame Cave is a heritage-listed cave and cultural site of the Wonnarua people at Milbrodale, in the Hunter region of New South Wales, Australia. It is also known as Baiame’s Cave, Creator Cave, Dhurramulan, Goign, Wabooee, Baiamai, Biami, Baimae, Biamie, Biaime, Byarmie and Byarme. It was added to the New South Wales State Heritage Register on 31 July 2015.

== Description ==
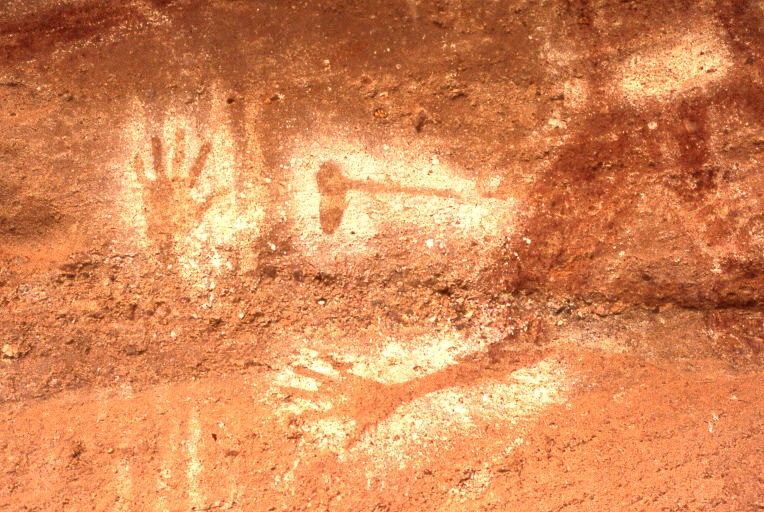
Baiame Cave rock art

Baiame Cave is an exposed escarpment of Hawkesbury sandstone, approximately 24 metres above the adjacent valley, on the western side of Bulga Creek, facing in a north-easterly direction, overlooking the Hunter Valley towards Singleton.

The location of the site and the open nature of the cave indicate that the site was specifically chosen for the purpose of showcasing the art interpretation of Baiame the 'Creator', and providing a panoramic view of the Hunter Valley. The site is significantly positioned above the valley floor, near a permanent water source, and acts as a gallery, enabling the Wonnarua people and visitors from neighbouring Aboriginal nations to view their 'Creator'.

The artwork is visible on the rear wall of the cave and depicts a larger-than-life male figure, outlined with white pigment and filled with a red pigment, with two large white circles for eyes and both arms outstretched. There is little to no detail visible, although the figure is the main focal point of the artwork and is positioned just off the centre of the cave. There are several key art stencils scattered around the figure's body below the arms, with only two art stencils located above the arms in the top corner of the cave. The stencils include boomerangs, left and right hands and forearms, a hafted axe and possibly a spear. The lower artwork has visible signs of deterioration due to the pigments fading, although the higher artwork is slightly more protected and appears less deteriorated.

The cave and rock art are exposed to the elements throughout the year, but a sloped floor provides good drainage, keeping it dry and free from moisture. The cave shows evidence of infestation by swallows, which have built nests in the roof. Cracks in the sandstone walls and ceiling have appeared on either side of the artwork, with one crack evident through Baiame's right arm.

In 1993, the National Parks and Wildlife Service constructed a wooden and compacted earth stairway leading from the unsealed road within the privately owned property to a viewing platform close to the entrance of Baiame Cave, to provide a safe access route and deter inappropriate access to the site. The stairway and mesh viewing platform are in good condition, although future maintenance of the stairway will be needed to maintain safety.

For the past 40 years, the private landowners have managed the site through regular inspections, and deterring livestock and inappropriate access. To date there have been no formal comparative studies conducted to compare the artwork of Baiame Cave and its condition over any period of time, however, in 2015 the landowners stated that over the 40 years they have owned the property, the site's condition is increasingly deteriorating with the pigments fading.

In 2015, the site remains relatively untouched by vandalism, the artwork is considered to be in its original form, but with fading and deterioration of the pigments caused by natural weathering.

== Significance ==
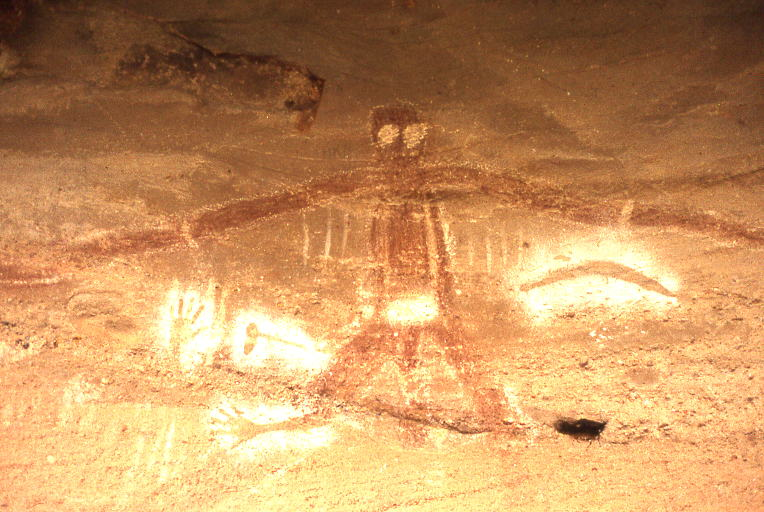
Baiame Cave rock art

Baiame Cave is a spiritual site depicting the image of the "Creator", it’s a pigment art representation of Baiame with his arms outstretched over the lands of the Wonnarua people.

Baiame Cave is an example of Aboriginal rock art and is highly respected by the local Wonnarua people, numerous Aboriginal nations throughout south-east Australia and the wider community of the Hunter Valley.

The artwork depicting Baiame signifies the site's significance as being an integral part of the history and social and cultural dynamics of Aboriginal culture and heritage within the Wonnarua area and surrounding Aboriginal communities. Baiame Cave is linked to the Creation story, country and totem (the Eagle) of the Wonnarua people, and is interconnected with numerous other Aboriginal cultural and heritage sites and landscapes throughout the Hunter Valley and NSW.

Baiame is directly associated with several significant Dreaming sites and stories throughout south-east Australia, which have previously been declared Aboriginal Places or listed on the SHR. Baiame Cave is the only known and recorded rock shelter with larger-than-life, pigment art depicting the ancestral creator Baiame.

Baiame Cave continues to demonstrate the importance of ancestral beings, creation stories and Dreaming sites throughout Aboriginal communities, providing the Wonnarua people with a place that enables them to maintain traditional practices and customs, share oral histories, creation stories and traditional lore (law). It is a place considered to be of special cultural, social and spiritual significance.

Wonnarua traditional owner Victor Perry has described their understanding of the artwork as such:

On the back of this cave out here at Milbrodale is a figure of, a deity figure that was known up and down the coast in Aboriginal tribal society. He had different names. In our language we called him Goign. But in some other languages he was called Baiame or Biamee. In other areas they used to call him Bundjel, Nerunderee and a lot of other different names. But essentially the figure in the cave here is . . . revered as the creator figure. If you'd like to interpret that, that would be the same as same as God as the creator to the English people. That is the Aboriginal interpretation of the creator. Just to explain about the drawings around the figure, there's boomerangs there which are called boringan in the Wonnarua language, stone axes which are interpreted as mogos. The hands on the wall are symbols of the people who perhaps looked after the area, or in this case may have looked after the cave and the actual painting on the wall. Some of the stories that are connected to the cave talk about Baiame's arms and why they are so long. The reason being is because he was believed to be protector of the area and protector of the people in the district. His eyes also are of large capacity because it was said also he was all seeing, all knowledge. And everyone revered [him]. Like they do today they had their own religion and the Aboriginal religion had the deity figure, Goign or in the other people's language, Baiame is the figure.'
