= Rock sliders =

Rock sliders are an aftermarket accessory popular among four-wheel drive vehicle owners who engage in more serious off-road driving.

Rock sliders are typically made of heavy-duty box section steel, although they can also be made from tubular steel as well. They run along each side of the vehicle, from just behind the front wheel to just before the rear wheel, just below the level of the door sills. They are welded or bolted (directly, L brackets and/or U brackets) on to the vehicle's frame, and their function is to protect the door sills and door bottoms from damage when crossing large obstacles (such as rocks - hence the name). There are a variety of materials, qualities and features.

== Types ==
Even though they serve relatively the same purpose, rock sliders come in four different types:

- Classic rock sliders – intended to protect the vehicle's side but can help to get in and out of the vehicle.
- Side steps with rock slider support – the general purpose is to help people get in and out of the vehicle, but additionally, the steps protect the vehicle from off-roading hazards, such as rocks.
- Power running boards – an electrically powered board that gets in out and hides away whenever the doors are opened/closed. Primarily serves as a modern and lightweight side step but additionally protects the vehicle from underneath.
- Rock sliders with rock skins – a combination of classy side steps and rocks skins. Rocks skins are stripes of steel usually drilled into the vehicle's body to protect it from dents, scratches, and other off-roading damage.
