= 2025 Rally Sierra Morena =

42nd edition of Rally Sierra Morena

2025 Rally Sierra Morena Rally Sierra Morena – Córdoba Patrimonio de la Humanidad 2025
Round 1 of 8 in the 2025 European Rally Championship
Next event →
- Host country: Spain
- Rally base: Córdoba, Andalucia
- Dates run: 3 April – 6 April 2025
- Stages: 13 (209.96 km; 130.46 miles)
- Stage surface: Tarmac
- Transport distance: 454.08 km (282.15 miles)
- Overall distance: 664.04 km (412.62 miles)

Statistics
- Crews registered: 115 (64 in ERC, 45 in Spain).
- Crews: 111 (62 in ERC) at start, 82 (47 in ERC) at finish

Overall results
- Overall winner: (Bulgaria) Nikolay Gryazin (Kyrgyzstan) Konstantin Aleksandrov (Poland) J2X Rally Team; Škoda Fabia RS Rally2; 2:01:49.5
- Power Stage winner: (Italy) Andrea Mabellini (Italy) Virginia Lenzi; Škoda Fabia RS Rally2; 6:46.5

The 2025 Rally Sierra Morena was a motor racing event for rally cars held over four days from 3 April to 6 April 2025. It marked the 42nd running of Rally Sierra Morena. The event was the opening round of the 2025 European Rally Championship and the second round of the 2025 Spain Superchampionship. The event was part of European Rally Championship for the first time since 1990 and for the second time in history.

== Event background ==
=== Event itinerary ===
Date	No.	Time	Stage name	Distance
4 April	—	9:30	Free practice	6.16 km
4 April	—	12:01	Qualifying stage	6.16 km
4 April	—	13:15	Shakedown	6.16 km
4 April	SS1	20:05	Córdoba	1.50 km
5 April	SS2	10:00	Obejo 1	6.70 km
5 April	SS3	11:05	Villanueva del Rey 1	12.80 km
5 April	SS4	12:10	Villaviciosa 1	27.19 km
5 April	SS5	15:10	Obejo 2	6.70 km
5 April	SS6	16:15	Villanueva del Rey 2	12.80 km
5 April	SS7	17:20	Villaviciosa 2	27.19 km
6 April	SS8	8:20	Cerrobejuelas 1	19.89 km
6 April	SS9	9:25	Pozoblanco — Villaharta 1	25.22 km
6 April	SS10	11:05	Ermitas — Trassierra 1	12.43 km
6 April	SS11	13:55	Cerrobejuelas 2	19.89 km
6 April	SS12	15:00	Pozoblanco — Villaharta 2	25.22 km
6 April	SS13	17:05	Ermitas — Trassierra 2	12.43 km

=== Entry list ===
A total of 115 crews entered the event, with 64 entered into ERC and 45 entered into Spain Superchampionship. 4 crews withdrew before the event, with 111 starting the rally.

WRC manufacturers Hyundai and Toyota entered crews as part of their testing before the 2025 Rally Islas Canarias, with Hyundai entering Thierry Neuville and Martijn Wydaeghe and Toyota entering Elfyn Evans and Scott Martin.

ERC Rally2 entries
No.	Driver	Co-Driver	Entrant	Car	Championship eligibility	Tyre
1	(Spain) Efrén Llarena	(Spain) Sara Fernández	(Spain) Efrén Llarena	Citroën C3 Rally2	Driver, co-driver	MI
2	(Poland) Mikołaj Marczyk	(Poland) Szymon Gospodarczyk	(Poland) Mikołaj Marczyk	Škoda Fabia RS Rally2	Driver, co-driver	MI
3	(Italy) Andrea Mabellini	(Italy) Virginia Lenzi	(Italy) Andrea Mabellini	Škoda Fabia RS Rally2	Driver, co-driver	P
4	(Republic of Ireland) Jon Armstrong	(Republic of Ireland) Shane Byrne	(United Kingdom) M-Sport Ford WRT	Ford Fiesta Rally2	Driver, co-driver, team	P
5	(Romania) Simone Tempestini	(Romania) Sergiu Itu	(India) Team MRF Tyres	Škoda Fabia RS Rally2	Driver, co-driver	MR
6	(Norway) Mads Østberg	(Norway) Torstein Eriksen	(Hungary) TRT Rally Team	Citroën C3 Rally2	Driver, co-driver, team	MI
7	(France) Yoann Bonato	(France) Benjamin Boulloud	(France) Yoann Bonato	Citroën C3 Rally2	Driver, co-driver	MI
8	(Austria) Simon Wagner	(Germany) Hanna Ostlender	(Czech Republic) Kowax DST Racing	Hyundai i20 N Rally2	Driver, co-driver, team	MI
9	(Czech Republic) Dominik Stříteský	(Slovakia) Igor Bacigál	(Czech Republic) Auto Podbabská Škoda PSG ACCR Team	Škoda Fabia RS Rally2	Driver, co-driver, team	MI
10	(Estonia) Robert Virves	(Estonia) Jakko Viilo	(Estonia) Robert Virves	Škoda Fabia RS Rally2	Driver, co-driver	HK
11	(Bulgaria) Nikolay Gryazin	(Kyrgyzstan) Konstantin Aleksandrov	(Poland) J2X Rally Team	Škoda Fabia RS Rally2	Driver, co-driver, team	MI
12	(Spain) José Antonio Suárez	(Spain) Alberto Iglesias Pin	(Spain) Recalvi Team	Škoda Fabia RS Rally2	Driver, co-driver, team	MI
14	(Poland) Jakub Matulka	(Poland) Damian Syty	(Poland) Jakub Matulka	Škoda Fabia RS Rally2	Driver, co-driver	MI
15	(Hungary) Martin László	(Hungary) Viktor Bán	(Hungary) Topp-Cars Rally Team	Škoda Fabia RS Rally2	Driver, co-driver, team	MI
16	(United Kingdom) Philip Allen	(United Kingdom) Craig Drew	(United Kingdom) Philip Allen	Škoda Fabia RS Rally2	Driver, co-driver	MI
17	(Sweden) Mille Johansson	(Sweden) Johan Grönvall	(Sweden) Mille Johansson	Škoda Fabia Rally2 evo	Driver, co-driver	HK
18	(Poland) Jarosław Kołtun	(Poland) Ireneusz Pleskot	(Poland) J2X Rally Team	Škoda Fabia RS Rally2	Driver, co-driver, team	MI
19	(France) Stéphane Lefebvre	(France) Andy Malfoy	(India) Team MRF Tyres	Hyundai i20 N Rally2	Driver, co-driver, team	MR
20	(Spain) Pepe López	(Spain) David Vázquez	(Spain) Hyundai Motor España	Hyundai i20 N Rally2	Driver, co-driver, team	P
21	(United Kingdom) James Williams	(United Kingdom) Ross Whittock	(India) Team MRF Tyres	Hyundai i20 N Rally2	Driver, co-driver, team	MR
22 (Note: Withdrawn before the start.)	(Belgium) Maxime Potty	(Belgium) Renaud Herman	(Belgium) Maxime Potty	Citroën C3 Rally2	Driver, co-driver	HK
23	(Netherlands) Jos Verstappen	(Belgium) Renaud Jamoul	(Netherlands) Jos Verstappen	Škoda Fabia RS Rally2	Driver, co-driver, Master ERC	P
24	(Hungary) András Hadik	(Hungary) István Juhász	(Hungary) B-A Promotion Kft.	Ford Fiesta Rally2	Driver, co-driver, Master ERC, Team	P
25	(Spain) Unai de la Dehesa	(Spain) Daniel Sosa Ojeda	(Spain) Citroën Rally Team	Citroën C3 Rally2	Driver, co-driver, team	P
26	(Spain) Roberto Blach Jr.	(Spain) Mauro Barreiro	(Spain) Roberto Blach Jr.	Škoda Fabia RS Rally2	Driver, co-driver	P
27	(Hungary) Norbert Herczig	(Hungary) Ramón Ferencz	(Hungary) Proformance Service Kft Team Staff House	Toyota GR Yaris Rally2	Driver, co-driver, team	P
28	(Czech Republic) Martin Vlček	(Czech Republic) Jakub Kunst	(Czech Republic) Kowax DST Racing	Hyundai i20 N Rally2	Driver, co-driver, Master ERC, team	P
29	(Poland) Dariusz Biedrzyński	(Poland) Rafał Fiołek	(Czech Republic) Kowax DST Racing	Hyundai i20 N Rally2	Driver, co-driver, Master ERC, team	MI
30	(Spain) Daniel Alonso Villarón	(Spain) Rubén Arboleya Gutiérrez	(Spain) Past Racing	Ford Fiesta Rally2	Driver, co-driver, Master ERC, team	HK
ERC Rally3 entries
31	(Poland) Igor Widłak	(Poland) Daniel Dymurski	(Poland) Grupa PGS RT	Ford Fiesta Rally3	Driver, co-driver, ERC3, Fiesta Rally3 Trophy, team	P
32	(Croatia) Martin Ravenščak	(Croatia) Dora Ravenščak	(Slovenia) IK Sport Racing	Ford Fiesta Rally3	Driver, co-driver, ERC3, Fiesta Rally3 Trophy, team	P
33	(Poland) Hubert Kowalczyk	(Poland) Jarosław Hryniuk	(Poland) Hubert Kowalczyk	Renault Clio Rally3	Driver, co-driver, ERC3	P
34	(France) Tristan Charpentier	(France) Florian Barral	(France) Tristan Charpentier	Ford Fiesta Rally3	Driver, co-driver, ERC3, Fiesta Rally3 Trophy	P
35	(Bulgaria) Aleksandar Tomov	(Bulgaria) Dimitar Spasov	(Bulgaria) Aleksandar Tomov	Renault Clio Rally3	Driver, co-driver, ERC3	P
36	(Poland) Adrian Rzeźnik	(Poland) Kamil Kozdroń	(Poland) Adrian Rzeźnik	Ford Fiesta Rally3	Driver, co-driver, ERC3, Fiesta Rally3 Trophy	P
37	(Poland) Błażej Gazda	(Poland) Michał Jurgała	(Poland) Błażej Gazda	Renault Clio Rally3	Driver, co-driver, ERC3	P
38	(Poland) Tymoteusz Abramowski	(Poland) Jakub Wróbel	(Poland) Tymoteusz Abramowski	Ford Fiesta Rally3	Driver, co-driver, ERC3, Fiesta Rally3 Trophy	P
39	(Republic of Ireland) Casey Jay Coleman	(Republic of Ireland) Killian McArdle	(Republic of Ireland) Casey Jay Coleman	Ford Fiesta Rally3	Driver, co-driver, ERC3, Fiesta Rally3 Trophy	P
40	(Sweden) Adam Grahn	(Sweden) Maja Bengtsson	(Sweden) Adam Grahn	Ford Fiesta Rally3	Driver, co-driver, ERC3, Fiesta Rally3 Trophy	P
41	(Poland) Sebastian Butyński	(Poland) Łukasz Jastrzębski	(Poland) Sebastian Butyński	Renault Clio Rally3	Driver, co-driver, ERC3	P
ERC Rally4 and Rally5 entries
42	(Sweden) Calle Carlberg	(Norway) Jørgen Eriksen	(Germany) ADAC Opel Rallye Junior Team	Opel Corsa Rally4	Driver, co-driver, ERC4, ERC Junior, team	HK
43	(Germany) Timo Schulz	(Germany) Michael Wenzel	(Germany) Timo Schulz	Opel Corsa Rally4	Driver, co-driver, ERC4, ERC Junior	HK
44	(Republic of Ireland) Aoife Raftery	(Republic of Ireland) Hannah McKillop	(Hungary) HRT Racing Kft.	Peugeot 208 Rally4	Driver, co-driver, ERC4, ERC Junior, team	HK
45	(Estonia) Jaspar Vaher	(Estonia) Sander Pruul	Team Estonia Autosport	Peugeot 208 Rally4	Driver, co-driver, ERC4, ERC Junior, Team	HK
46	(Poland) Hubert Laskowski	(Spain) Esther Gutiérrez	(Poland) Hubert Laskowski	Peugeot 208 Rally4	Driver, co-driver, ERC4, ERC Junior	HK
47	(Estonia) Mark-Egert Tilts	(Estonia) Rainis Raidma	Team Estonia Autosport	Ford Fiesta Rally4	Driver, co-driver, ERC4, ERC Junior, team	HK
48	(Spain) Sergi Pérez Jr.	(Spain) Axel Coronado	(Spain) RACC Motorsport	Peugeot 208 Rally4	Driver, co-driver, ERC4, ERC Junior, Team	HK
49	(Belgium) Maxim Decock	(Belgium) Tom Buyse	(Belgium) Maxim Decock	Opel Corsa Rally4	Driver, co-driver, ERC4, ERC Junior	HK
50	(United Kingdom) Ioan Lloyd	(United Kingdom) Sion Williams	(United Kingdom) Ioan Lloyd	Peugeot 208 Rally4	Driver, co-driver, ERC4, ERC Junior	HK
51	(Republic of Ireland) Craig Rahill	(Republic of Ireland) Conor Smith	(Republic of Ireland) Motorsport Ireland Rally Academy	Peugeot 208 Rally4	Driver, co-driver, ERC4, ERC Junior, team	HK
52	(Republic of Ireland) Keelan Grogan	(Republic of Ireland) Ayrton Sherlock	(Republic of Ireland) Motorsport Ireland Rally Academy	Peugeot 208 Rally4	Driver, co-driver, ERC4, ERC Junior, team	HK
53	(Italy) Francesco Dei Ceci	(Italy) Nicolò Lazzarini	(Italy) Francesco Dei Ceci	Peugeot 208 Rally4	Driver, co-driver, ERC4, ERC Junior	HK
54	(Italy) Matteo Doretto	(Italy) Andrea Budoia	(Italy) Matteo Doretto	Peugeot 208 Rally4	Driver, co-driver, ERC4, ERC Junior	HK
55	(Austria) Luca Pröglhöf	(Germany) Christina Ettel	(Germany) ADAC Opel Rallye Junior Team	Opel Corsa Rally4	Driver, co-driver, ERC4, ERC Junior, team	HK
56	(Finland) Leevi Lassila	(Finland) Antti Linnaketo	(Slovenia) IK Sport Racing	Opel Corsa Rally4	Driver, co-driver, ERC4, ERC Junior, team	HK
57	(Sweden) Simon Andersson	(Sweden) Jörgen Jönsson	(Sweden) Simon Andersson	Renault Clio Rally4	Driver, co-driver, ERC4, ERC Junior	HK
58	(Finland) Tuukka Kauppinen	(Finland) Topi Luhtinen	(Finland) Tuukka Kauppinen	Peugeot 208 Rally4	Driver, co-driver, ERC4, ERC Junior	HK
59	(Germany) Tom Kässer	(Germany) Stephan Schneeweiß	(Germany) Tom Kässer	Peugeot 208 Rally4	Driver, co-driver, ERC4	P
60	(Portugal) Kevin Saraiva	(Portugal) Beatriz Pinto	(Portugal) Kevin Saraiva	Renault Clio Rally4	Driver, co-driver, ERC4, ERC Junior	HK
61	(Italy) Tommaso Sandrin	(Italy) Andrea Dal Maso	(Italy) Tommaso Sandrin	Peugeot 208 Rally4	Driver, co-driver, ERC4, ERC Junior	HK
62	(Sweden) Victor Hansen	(Denmark) Ditte Kammersgaard	(Sweden) Victor Hansen	Peugeot 208 Rally4	Driver, co-driver, ERC4, ERC Junior	HK
63	(Spain) Jordi San Andrés Salvador	(Spain) Alberto Gil Mora	(Spain) RACC Motorsport	Peugeot 208 Rally4	Driver, co-driver, ERC4, team	P
64	(Romania) Ciprian Lupu	(Romania) Vlad Colceriu	(Romania) Ciprian Lupu	Renault Clio Rally5	Driver, co-driver, ERC4	P
65	(Romania) Catherine Rădulescu	(Romania) Bogdan Minea	(Romania) Catherine Rădulescu	Renault Clio Rally4	Driver, co-driver, ERC4	P
Other important entries
66	(Spain) Alejandro Cachón	(Spain) Borja Rozada	(Spain) Toyota España	Toyota GR Yaris Rally2	/	P
83	(Spain) Laia Sanz	(Spain) Luka Larrosa	(Spain) CSM Automoció	Toyota GR Yaris N4	/	P
84	(Belgium) Thierry Neuville	(Belgium) Martijn Wydaeghe	(Germany) Hyundai Shell Mobis WRT	Hyundai i20 N Rally1	/	HK
85	(United Kingdom) Elfyn Evans	(United Kingdom) Scott Martin	(Japan) Toyota Gazoo Racing WRT	Toyota GR Yaris Rally1	/	HK

== Rally report ==
=== ERC Rally2 ===
==== Final classification ====
Position		No.	Driver	Co-driver	Entrant	Car	Tyre	Time	Difference	Points	
Class	Event	No.	Driver	Co-driver	Entrant	Car	Tyre	Time	Difference	Event	Power Stage
1	1	11	(Bulgaria) Nikolay Gryazin	(Kyrgyzstan) Konstantin Aleksandrov	(Poland) J2X Rally Team	Škoda Fabia RS Rally2	MI	2:01:49.5	—N/a	30	4
2	2	7	(France) Yoann Bonato	(France) Benjamin Boulloud	(France) Yoann Bonato	Citroën C3 Rally2	MI	2:02:35.5	46.0	24	2
3	3	12	(Spain) José Antonio Suárez	(Spain) Alberto Iglesias Pin	(Spain) Recalvi Team	Škoda Fabia RS Rally2	MI	2:03:14.3	1:24.8	21	1
4	4	3	(Italy) Andrea Mabellini	(Italy) Virginia Lenzi	(Italy) Andrea Mabellini	Škoda Fabia RS Rally2	P	2:03:27.1	1:37.6	19	5
5	5	2	(Poland) Mikołaj Marczyk	(Poland) Szymon Gospodarczyk	(Poland) Mikołaj Marczyk	Škoda Fabia RS Rally2	MI	2:03:51.7	2:02.2	17	3
6	6	20	(Spain) Pepe López	(Spain) David Vázquez	(Spain) Hyundai Motor España	Hyundai i20 N Rally2	P	2:04:28.1	2:38.6	15	
7	7	17	(Sweden) Mille Johansson	(Sweden) Johan Grönvall	(Sweden) Mille Johansson	Škoda Fabia Rally2 evo	HK	2:04:40.6	2:51.1	13	
8	8	6	(Norway) Mads Østberg	(Norway) Torstein Eriksen	(Hungary) TRT Rally Team	Citroën C3 Rally2	MI	2:04:49.6	3:00.1	11	
9	9	19	(France) Stéphane Lefebvre	(France) Andy Malfoy	(India) Team MRF Tyres	Hyundai i20 N Rally2	MR	2:05:35.8	3:46.3	9	
10	10	8	(Austria) Simon Wagner	(Germany) Hanna Ostlender	(Czech Republic) Kowax DST Racing	Hyundai i20 N Rally2	MI	2:05:39.8	3:50.3	7	
11	11	14	(Poland) Jakub Matulka	(Poland) Damian Syty	(Poland) Jakub Matulka	Škoda Fabia RS Rally2	MI	2:06:52.9	5:03.4	5	
12	12	26	(Spain) Roberto Blach Jr.	(Spain) Mauro Barreiro	(Spain) Roberto Blach Jr.	Škoda Fabia RS Rally2	P	2:06:57.9	5:08.4	4	
13	13	23	(Netherlands) Jos Verstappen	(Belgium) Renaud Jamoul	(Netherlands) Jos Verstappen	Škoda Fabia RS Rally2	P	2:07:15.3	5:25.8	3	
14	14	25	(Spain) Unai de la Dehesa	(Spain) Daniel Sosa Ojeda	(Spain) Citroën Rally Team	Citroën C3 Rally2	P	2:08:48.8	6:59.3	2	
15	15	24	(Hungary) András Hadik	(Hungary) István Juhász	(Hungary) András Hadik	Ford Fiesta Rally2	P	2:09:46.5	7:57.0	1	
16	16	15	(Hungary) Martin László	(Hungary) Viktor Bán	(Hungary) Topp-Cars Rally Team	Škoda Fabia RS Rally2	MI	2:11:54.7	10:05.2		
17	20	28	(Czech Republic) Martin Vlček	(Czech Republic) Jakub Kunst	(Czech Republic) Kowax DST Racing	Hyundai i20 N Rally2	P	2:13:22.0	11:32.5		
18	37	29	(Poland) Dariusz Biedrzyński	(Poland) Rafał Fiołek	(Czech Republic) Kowax DST Racing	Hyundai i20 N Rally2	MI	2:19:13.5	17:24.0		
Retired SS12		10	(Estonia) Robert Virves	(Estonia) Jakko Viilo	(Estonia) Robert Virves	Škoda Fabia RS Rally2	HK	Mechanical			
Retired SS10		5	(Romania) Simone Tempestini	(Romania) Sergiu Itu	(India) Team MRF Tyres	Škoda Fabia RS Rally2	MR	Accident			
Retired SS9		9	(Czech Republic) Dominik Stříteský	(Slovakia) Igor Bacigál	(Czech Republic) Auto Podbabská Škoda PSG ACCR Team	Škoda Fabia RS Rally2	MI	Accident			
Retired SS8		4	(Republic of Ireland) Jon Armstrong	(Republic of Ireland) Shane Byrne	(United Kingdom) M-Sport Ford WRT	Ford Fiesta Rally2	P	Suspension			
Retired SS7		1	(Spain) Efrén Llarena	(Spain) Sara Fernández	(Spain) Efrén Llarena	Citroën C3 Rally2	MI	Mechanical			
Retired SS6		27	(Hungary) Norbert Herczig	(Hungary) Ramón Ferencz	(Hungary) Proformance Service Kft Team Staff House	Toyota GR Yaris Rally2	P	Brakes			
Retired SS4		30	(Spain) Daniel Alonso Villarón	(Spain) Rubén Arboleya Gutiérrez	(Spain) Past Racing	Ford Fiesta Rally2	HK	Mechanical			
Retired SS4		16	(United Kingdom) Philip Allen	(United Kingdom) Craig Drew	(United Kingdom) Philip Allen	Škoda Fabia RS Rally2	MI	Accident			
Retired SS3		21	(United Kingdom) James Williams	(United Kingdom) Ross Whittock	(India) Team MRF Tyres	Hyundai i20 N Rally2	MR	Accident			
Did not start		18	(Poland) Jarosław Kołtun	(Poland) Ireneusz Pleskot	(Poland) J2X Rally Team	Škoda Fabia RS Rally2	MI	Medical reasons			
Withdrawn		22	(Belgium) Maxime Potty	(Belgium) Renaud Herman	(Belgium) Maxime Potty	Citroën C3 Rally2	HK	Withdrawn			

==== By stage ====
Stage	Winners	Car	Time	Class leaders
FP	Armstrong/Treacy	Ford Fiesta Rally2	3:12.612	—N/a
QS	Gryazin/Aleksandrov	Škoda Fabia RS Rally2	3:12.404	—N/a
SS1	Gryazin/Aleksandrov	Škoda Fabia RS Rally2	1:39.4	Gryazin/Aleksandrov
SS2	Armstrong/Byrne	Ford Fiesta Rally2	4:16.1	Gryazin/Aleksandrov
SS3	Mabellini/Lenzi	Škoda Fabia RS Rally2	6:21.4	Gryazin/Aleksandrov
SS4	Gryazin/Aleksandrov	Škoda Fabia RS Rally2	16:08.7	Gryazin/Aleksandrov
SS5	Llarena/Fernández	Citroën C3 Rally2	4:09.5	Gryazin/Aleksandrov
SS6	Gryazin/Aleksandrov	Škoda Fabia RS Rally2	6:10.7	Gryazin/Aleksandrov
SS7	Gryazin/Aleksandrov	Škoda Fabia RS Rally2	16:01.1	Gryazin/Aleksandrov
SS8	Bonato/Boulloud	Citroën C3 Rally2	12:02.1	Gryazin/Aleksandrov
SS9	Gryazin/Aleksandrov	Škoda Fabia RS Rally2	14:33.3	Gryazin/Aleksandrov
SS10	Gryazin/Aleksandrov	Škoda Fabia RS Rally2	6:45.0	Gryazin/Aleksandrov
SS11	Gryazin/Aleksandrov	Škoda Fabia RS Rally2	12:03.8	Gryazin/Aleksandrov
SS12	Gryazin/Aleksandrov	Škoda Fabia RS Rally2	14:36.0	Gryazin/Aleksandrov
SS13	Mabellini/Lenzi	Škoda Fabia RS Rally2	6:46.5	Gryazin/Aleksandrov

=== ERC3 ===
==== Final classification ====
Position		No.	Driver	Co-driver	Entrant	Car	Tyre	Time	Difference	Points
Class	Event	No.	Driver	Co-driver	Entrant	Car	Tyre	Time	Difference	Points
1	22	34	(France) Tristan Charpentier	(France) Florian Barral	(France) Tristan Charpentier	Ford Fiesta Rally3	P	2:13:43.0	—N/a	30
2	23	36	(Poland) Adrian Rzeźnik	(Poland) Kamil Kozdroń	(Poland) Adrian Rzeźnik	Ford Fiesta Rally3	P	2:14:10.8	+27.8	24
3	26	38	(Poland) Tymoteusz Abramowski	(Poland) Jakub Wróbel	(Poland) Tymoteusz Abramowski	Ford Fiesta Rally3	P	2:14:33.4	+50.4	21
4	32	32	(Croatia) Martin Ravenščak	(Croatia) Dora Ravenščak	(Slovenia) IK Sport Racing	Ford Fiesta Rally3	P	2:17:58.8	+4:15.8	19
5	34	31	(Poland) Igor Widłak	(Poland) Daniel Dymurski	(Poland) Grupa PGS RT	Ford Fiesta Rally3	P	2:18:26.3	+4:43.3	17
6	36	33	(Poland) Hubert Kowalczyk	(Poland) Jarosław Hryniuk	(Poland) Hubert Kowalczyk	Renault Clio Rally3	P	2:18:46.4	+5:03.4	15
7	38	41	(Poland) Sebastian Butyński	(Poland) Łukasz Jastrzębski	(Poland) Sebastian Butyński	Renault Clio Rally3	P	2:21:36.7	+7:53.7	13
8	39	39	(Republic of Ireland) Casey Jay Coleman	(Republic of Ireland) Killian McArdle	(Republic of Ireland) Casey Jay Coleman	Ford Fiesta Rally3	P	2:22:38.7	+8:55.7	11
9	40	37	(Poland) Błażej Gazda	(Poland) Michał Jurgała	(Poland) Błażej Gazda	Renault Clio Rally3	P	2:24:02.0	+10:19.0	9
Retired SS11		35	(Bulgaria) Aleksandar Tomov	(Bulgaria) Dimitar Spasov	(Bulgaria) Aleksandar Tomov	Renault Clio Rally3	P	Mechanical		
Withdrawn		40	(Sweden) Adam Grahn	(Sweden) Maja Bengtsson	(Sweden) Adam Grahn	Ford Fiesta Rally3	P	Withdrawn		

==== By stage ====
Stage	Winners	Car	Time	Class leaders
FP	Rzeźnik/Kozdroń	Ford Fiesta Rally3	3:36.5	—N/a
SS1	Widłak/Dymurski	Ford Fiesta Rally3	1:49.1	Widłak/Dymurski
SS2	Abramowski/Wróbel	Ford Fiesta Rally3	4:35.8	Kowalczyk/Hryniuk
SS3	Charpentier/Barral	Ford Fiesta Rally3	6:54.8	Charpentier/Barral
SS4 (Note: Notional times applied after the accident of Philip Allen and Craig Drew.)	—N/a	—N/a	—N/a	Charpentier/Barral
SS5	Kowalczyk/Hryniuk	Renault Clio Rally3	4:30.7	Charpentier/Barral
SS6	Kowalczyk/Hryniuk	Renault Clio Rally3	6:44.2	Charpentier/Barral
SS7	Charpentier/Barral	Ford Fiesta Rally3	18:07.3	Charpentier/Barral
SS8	Rzeźnik/Kozdroń	Ford Fiesta Rally3	13:08.5	Charpentier/Barral
SS9	Charpentier/Barral	Ford Fiesta Rally3	15:58.8	Charpentier/Barral
SS10	Abramowski/Wróbel	Ford Fiesta Rally3	7:23.8	Charpentier/Barral
SS11	Charpentier/Barral	Ford Fiesta Rally3	13:02.4	Charpentier/Barral
SS12	Abramowski/Wróbel	Ford Fiesta Rally3	15:58.2	Charpentier/Barral
SS13	Rzeźnik/Kozdroń	Ford Fiesta Rally3	7:22.9	Charpentier/Barral

=== ERC4 ===
==== Final classification ====
Position		No.	Driver	Co-driver	Entrant	Car	Tyre	Time	Difference	Points
Class	Event	No.	Driver	Co-driver	Entrant	Car	Tyre	Time	Difference	Points
1	17	48	(Spain) Sergi Pérez Jr.	(Spain) Axel Coronado	(Spain) RACC Motorsport	Peugeot 208 Rally4	HK	2:11:57.4	—N/a	30
2	18	42	(Sweden) Calle Carlberg	(Norway) Jørgen Eriksen	(Germany) ADAC Opel Rallye Junior Team	Opel Corsa Rally4	HK	2:12:00.8	+3.4	24
3	19	45	(Estonia) Jaspar Vaher	(Estonia) Sander Pruul	Team Estonia Autosport	Peugeot 208 Rally4	HK	2:12:54.3	+56.9	21
4	21	51	(Republic of Ireland) Craig Rahill	(Republic of Ireland) Conor Smith	(Republic of Ireland) Motorsport Ireland Rally Academy	Peugeot 208 Rally4	HK	2:13:40.2	+1:42.5	19
5	24	50	(United Kingdom) Ioan Lloyd	(United Kingdom) Sion Williams	(United Kingdom) Ioan Lloyd	Peugeot 208 Rally4	HK	2:14:17.0	+2:19.6	17
6	25	61	(Italy) Tommaso Sandrin	(Italy) Andrea Dal Maso	(Italy) Tommaso Sandrin	Peugeot 208 Rally4	HK	2:14:21.7	+2:24.3	15
7	27	54	(Italy) Matteo Doretto	(Italy) Andrea Budoia	(Italy) Matteo Doretto	Peugeot 208 Rally4	HK	2:15:06.5	+3:09.1	13
8	28	55	(Austria) Luca Pröglhöf	(Germany) Christina Ettel	(Germany) ADAC Opel Rallye Junior Team	Opel Corsa Rally4	HK	2:15:16.2	+3:18.8	11
9	29	46	(Poland) Hubert Laskowski	(Spain) Esther Gutiérrez	(Poland) Hubert Laskowski	Peugeot 208 Rally4	HK	2:15:17.0	+3:19.6	9
10	30	62	(Sweden) Victor Hansen	(Denmark) Ditte Kammersgaard	(Sweden) Victor Hansen	Peugeot 208 Rally4	HK	2:16:20.5	+4:23.1	7
11	31	57	(Sweden) Simon Andersson	(Sweden) Jörgen Jönsson	(Sweden) Simon Andersson	Renault Clio Rally4	HK	2:16:43.0	+4:45.6	5
12	33	49	(Belgium) Maxim Decock	(Belgium) Tom Buyse	(Belgium) Maxim Decock	Opel Corsa Rally4	HK	2:18:12.1	+6:14.7	4
13	35	52	(Republic of Ireland) Keelan Grogan	(Republic of Ireland) Ayrton Sherlock	(Republic of Ireland) Motorsport Ireland Rally Academy	Peugeot 208 Rally4	HK	2:18:33.1	+6:35.7	3
14	41	47	(Estonia) Mark-Egert Tilts	(Estonia) Rainis Raidma	Team Estonia Autosport	Ford Fiesta Rally4	HK	2:26:09.5	+14:12.1	2
15	42	44	(Republic of Ireland) Aoife Raftery	(Republic of Ireland) Hannah McKillop	(Hungary) HRT Racing Kft.	Peugeot 208 Rally4	HK	2:26:47.6	+14:50.2	1
16	43	63	(Spain) Jordi San Andrés Salvador	(Spain) Alberto Gil Mora	(Spain) RACC Motorsport	Peugeot 208 Rally4	P	2:26:47.7	+14:50.3	
17	44	43	(Germany) Timo Schulz	(Germany) Michael Wenzel	(Germany) Timo Schulz	Opel Corsa Rally4	HK	2:31:01.9	+19:04.5	
18	45	65	(Romania) Catherine Rădulescu	(Romania) Bogdan Minea	(Romania) Catherine Rădulescu	Renault Clio Rally4	P	2:33:24.1	+21:26.7	
19	46	64	(Romania) Ciprian Lupu	(Romania) Vlad Colceriu	(Romania) Ciprian Lupu	Renault Clio Rally5	P	2:44:05.3	+32:07.9	
20	47	58	(Finland) Tuukka Kauppinen	(Finland) Topi Luhtinen	(Finland) Tuukka Kauppinen	Peugeot 208 Rally4	HK	3:13:59.2	+1:02:01.8	
Retired SS13		60	(Portugal) Kevin Saraiva	(Portugal) Beatriz Pinto	(Portugal) Kevin Saraiva	Renault Clio Rally4	HK	Accident after flying finish		
Retired SS10		53	(Italy) Francesco Dei Ceci	(Italy) Nicolò Lazzarini	(Italy) Francesco Dei Ceci	Peugeot 208 Rally4	HK	Accident		
Retired SS9		56	(Finland) Leevi Lassila	(Finland) Antti Linnaketo	(Slovenia) IK Sport Racing	Opel Corsa Rally4	HK	Accident		
Retired SS9		59	(Germany) Tom Kässer	(Germany) Stephan Schneeweiß	(Germany) Tom Kässer	Peugeot 208 Rally4	HK	Power steering		

==== By stage ====
Stage	Winners	Car	Time	Class leaders
FP	Carlberg/Eriksen	Opel Corsa Rally4	3:35.9	—N/a
SS1	Laskowski/Gutiérrez	Peugeot 208 Rally4	1:57.3	Laskowski/Gutiérrez
SS2	Carlberg/Eriksen	Opel Corsa Rally4	4:34.6	Schulz/Wenzel
SS3	Carlberg/Eriksen	Opel Corsa Rally4	6:47.2	Schulz/Wenzel
SS4	—N/a	—N/a	—N/a	Schulz/Wenzel
SS5	Pérez/Coronado	Peugeot 208 Rally4	4:27.7	Schulz/Wenzel
SS6	Carlberg/Eriksen	Opel Corsa Rally4	6:40.5	Pérez/Coronado
SS7	Carlberg/Eriksen	Opel Corsa Rally4	17:43.8	Pérez/Coronado
SS8	Pérez/Coronado	Peugeot 208 Rally4	13:05.9	Pérez/Coronado
SS9	Pérez/Coronado	Peugeot 208 Rally4	15:47.1	Pérez/Coronado
SS10	Carlberg/Eriksen	Opel Corsa Rally4	7:17.1	Pérez/Coronado
SS11	Pérez/Coronado	Peugeot 208 Rally4	12:58.9	Pérez/Coronado
SS12	Carlberg/Eriksen	Opel Corsa Rally4	15:43.5	Pérez/Coronado
SS13	Carlberg/Eriksen	Opel Corsa Rally4	7:14.7	Pérez/Coronado
