= 2025 Rally Hungary =

6th edition of Rally Hungary

Round 2 of 8 in the 2025 European Rally Championship
← Previous event	Next event →
- Host country: Hungary
- Rally base: Veszprém, Veszprém County
- Dates run: 9 May 2025 – 11 May 2025
- Stages: 13 (191.01 km; 118.69 miles)
- Stage surface: Gravel
- Transport distance: 637.31 km (396.01 miles)
- Overall distance: 828.32 km (514.69 miles)

Statistics
- Crews registered: 93 (65 in ERC, 23 in Hungary).
- Crews: 91 (64 in ERC, 23 in Hungary) at start, 54 (41 in ERC, 13 in Hungary) at finish

Overall results
- Overall winner: (Finland) Roope Korhonen (Finland) Anssi Viinikka (India) Team MRF Tyres; Toyota GR Yaris Rally2; 1:50:30.7
- Power Stage winner: (United Kingdom) Philip Allen (United Kingdom) Craig Drew; Škoda Fabia RS Rally2; 8:09.3

The 2025 Rally Hungary was a motor racing event for rally cars held over three days from 9 May to 11 May 2025. It marked the 6th running of Rally Hungary. The event was the second round of the 2025 European Rally Championship. It also marked the second running on Rally Hungary on gravel surface.

== Event background ==
=== Event itinerary ===
Date	No.	Time	Stage name	Distance
9 May	—	11:00	Free practice	6.00 km
9 May	—	14:01	Shakedown	6.00 km
9 May	—	15:13	Qualifying Stage	6.00 km
9 May	SS1	18:05	SSS Királyszentistván	2.05 km
10 May	SS2	9:18	Hegyesd 1	18.75 km
10 May	SS3	10:46	Kislőtér 1	25.80 km
10 May	SS4	11:44	Várpalota 1	8.80 km
10 May	SS5	14:59	Hegyesd 2	18.75 km
10 May	SS6	16:27	Kislőtér 2	25.80 km
10 May	SS7	17:25	Várpalota 2	8.80 km
11 May	SS8	9:27	Iszka 1	15.34 km
11 May	SS9	10:35	Tés 1	10.25 km
11 May	SS10	11:35	Nagylőtér 1	15.54 km
11 May	SS11	13:59	Iszka 2	15.34 km
11 May	SS12	15:07	Tés 2	10.25 km
11 May	SS13	17:05	Nagylőtér 2	15.54 km

=== Entry list ===
A total of 93 crews entered the event, with 65 entered into ERC and 23 entered into the Hungarian championship.

ERC Rally2 entries
No.	Driver	Co-Driver	Entrant	Car	Championship eligibility	Tyre
1	(Finland) Roope Korhonen	(Finland) Anssi Viinikka	(India) Team MRF Tyres	Toyota GR Yaris Rally2	Driver, co-driver, team	MR
2	(Italy) Andrea Mabellini	(Italy) Virginia Lenzi	(Italy) Andrea Mabellini	Škoda Fabia RS Rally2	Driver, co-driver	P
3	(Poland) Mikołaj Marczyk	(Poland) Szymon Gospodarczyk	(Poland) Mikołaj Marczyk	Škoda Fabia RS Rally2	Driver, co-driver	MI
4	(Norway) Mads Østberg	(Norway) Torstein Eriksen	(Hungary) TRT Rally Team	Citroën C3 Rally2	Driver, co-driver, team	MI
5	(Poland) Jakub Matulka	(Poland) Damian Syty	(Poland) Jakub Matulka	Škoda Fabia RS Rally2	Driver, co-driver	MI
6	(Spain) Roberto Blach Jr.	(Spain) Mauro Barreiro	(Spain) Roberto Blach Jr.	Škoda Fabia RS Rally2	Driver, co-driver	P
7	(Netherlands) Jos Verstappen	(Belgium) Renaud Jamoul	(Netherlands) Jos Verstappen	Škoda Fabia RS Rally2	Driver, co-driver, Master ERC	P
8	(Hungary) András Hadik	(Hungary) István Juhász	(Hungary) B-A Promotion Kft.	Ford Fiesta Rally2	Driver, co-driver, Master ERC, team	P
9	(Republic of Ireland) Jon Armstrong	(Republic of Ireland) Shane Byrne	(United Kingdom) M-Sport Ford WRT	Ford Fiesta Rally2	Driver, co-driver, Master ERC, team	P
10	(Romania) Simone Tempestini	(Romania) Sergiu Itu	(India) Team MRF Tyres	Škoda Fabia RS Rally2	Driver, co-driver, team	MR
11	(Czech Republic) Dominik Stříteský	(Slovakia) Igor Bacigál	(Czech Republic) Auto Podbabská Škoda PSG ACCR Team	Škoda Fabia RS Rally2	Driver, co-driver, team	MI
12	(Hungary) Martin László	(Hungary) Viktor Bán	(Hungary) Topp-Cars Rally Team	Škoda Fabia RS Rally2	Driver, co-driver, team	MI
14	(United Kingdom) Philip Allen	(United Kingdom) Craig Drew	(United Kingdom) Philip Allen	Škoda Fabia RS Rally2	Driver, co-driver	MI
15	(Poland) Jarosław Kołtun	(Poland) Ireneusz Pleskot	(Poland) J2X Rally Team	Škoda Fabia RS Rally2	Driver, co-driver, team	MI
16	(Hungary) Norbert Herczig	(Hungary) Ramón Ferencz	(Hungary) Proformance Service Kft Team Staff House	Škoda Fabia RS Rally2	Driver, co-driver, team	P
17	(Czech Republic) Martin Vlček	(Czech Republic) Jakub Kunst	(Czech Republic) Kowax DST Racing	Hyundai i20 N Rally2	Driver, co-driver, Master ERC, team	P
18	(Poland) Dariusz Biedrzyński	(Poland) Rafał Fiołek	(Czech Republic) Kowax DST Racing	Hyundai i20 N Rally2	Driver, co-driver, Master ERC, team	P
19	(Hungary) Frigyes Turán	(Hungary) Gábor Zsiros	(Hungary) Turán Motorsport SE	Škoda Fabia RS Rally2	Driver, co-driver, Master ERC, team	HK
20	(Hungary) Miklós Csomós	(Hungary) Attila Nagy	(India) Team MRF Tyres	Citroën C3 Rally2	Driver, co-driver, team	MR
21	(United Kingdom) Max McRae	(United Kingdom) Cameron Fair	(India) Team MRF Tyres	Citroën C3 Rally2	Driver, co-driver, team	MR
22	(Sweden) Isak Reiersen	(Sweden) Stefan Gustavsson	(Sweden) Isak Reiersen	Škoda Fabia RS Rally2	Driver, co-driver	HK
23	(Romania) Norbert Maior	(Romania) Francesca Maria Maior	(Romania) Norbert Maior	Citroën C3 Rally2	Driver, co-driver	HK
24	(Romania) Bogdan Cuzma	(Romania) Marc Banca	(Romania) Bogdan Cuzma	Škoda Fabia RS Rally2	Driver, co-driver	MI
25	(Hungary) Gábor Német	(Hungary) Gergely Németh	(Hungary) Borsod Talent MSE	Škoda Fabia RS Rally2	Driver, co-driver, team	P
26	(Hungary) Antal Kovács	(Hungary) Richárd Csáki	(Hungary) Pécsi Sport Nonprofit Zrt.	Hyundai i20 N Rally2	Driver, co-driver, team	HK
27	(Hungary) Sándor „Sasa” Ollé	(Hungary) Rebeka Ollé	(Hungary) Treff-Autóház Kft.	Škoda Fabia Rally2 evo	Driver, co-driver, Master ERC, team	P
28	(Hungary) Miklós Bujdos	(Hungary) Tamás Csontos	(Hungary) Ba-Ro Motorsport	Škoda Fabia RS Rally2	Driver, co-driver, Master ERC, team	HK
29	(Czech Republic) David Tomek	(Czech Republic) Vítězslav Baďura	(Czech Republic) Top Trans Highway s.r.o.	Škoda Fabia Rally2 evo	Driver, co-driver, team	HK
30	(Poland) Tomasz Ociepa	(Poland) Paweł Pochroń	(Poland) Tradepol Rally Team	Škoda Fabia Rally2 evo	Driver, co-driver, Master ERC, team	P
31	(France) Tristan Charpentier	(France) Florian Barral	(France) Tristan Charpentier	Ford Fiesta Rally3	Driver, co-driver, ERC3, Fiesta Rally3 Trophy	P
32	(Poland) Adrian Rzeźnik	(Poland) Kamil Kozdroń	(Poland) Adrian Rzeźnik	Ford Fiesta Rally3	Driver, co-driver, ERC3, Fiesta Rally3 Trophy	P
33	(Poland) Tymoteusz Abramowski	(Poland) Jakub Wróbel	(Poland) Tymoteusz Abramowski	Ford Fiesta Rally3	Driver, co-driver, ERC3, Fiesta Rally3 Trophy	P
34	(Croatia) Martin Ravenščak	(Croatia) Dora Ravenščak	(Slovenia) IK Sport Racing	Ford Fiesta Rally3	Driver, co-driver, ERC3, Fiesta Rally3 Trophy, team	P
35	(Poland) Igor Widłak	(Poland) Daniel Dymurski	(Poland) Grupa PGS RT	Ford Fiesta Rally3	Driver, co-driver, ERC3, Fiesta Rally3 Trophy, team	P
36	(Poland) Hubert Kowalczyk	(Poland) Jarosław Hryniuk	(Poland) Hubert Kowalczyk	Renault Clio Rally3	Driver, co-driver, ERC3	P
37	(Poland) Sebastian Butyński	(Poland) Łukasz Jastrzębski	(Poland) Sebastian Butyński	Renault Clio Rally3	Driver, co-driver, ERC3	P
38	(Republic of Ireland) Casey Jay Coleman	(Republic of Ireland) Killian McArdle	(Republic of Ireland) Casey Jay Coleman	Ford Fiesta Rally3	Driver, co-driver, ERC3, Fiesta Rally3 Trophy	P
39	(Poland) Błażej Gazda	(Poland) Michał Jurgała	(Poland) Błażej Gazda	Renault Clio Rally3	Driver, co-driver, ERC3	P
40	(Sweden) Adam Grahn	(Sweden) Christoffer Bäck	(Sweden) Adam Grahn	Ford Fiesta Rally3	Driver, co-driver, ERC3, Fiesta Rally3 Trophy	P
41	(Hungary) Márton Bertalan	(Hungary) Róbert Paizs	(Hungary) OLP Motorsport Kft.	Ford Fiesta Rally3	Driver, co-driver, ERC3, Fiesta Rally3 Trophy, team	P
42	(Finland) Ville Vatanen	(Finland) Jarno Ottman	(Finland) Ville Vatanen	Renault Clio Rally3	Driver, co-driver, ERC3	MI
43	(Estonia) Esmar-Arnold Unt	(Romania) Denisa-Alexia Parteni	(Estonia) CRC Rally Team	Ford Fiesta Rally3	Driver, co-driver, ERC3, Fiesta Rally3 Trophy, team	P
44	(Spain) Sergi Pérez Jr.	(Spain) Axel Coronado	(Spain) RACC Motorsport	Peugeot 208 Rally4	Driver, co-driver, ERC4, ERC Junior, team	HK
45	(Sweden) Calle Carlberg	(Norway) Jørgen Eriksen	(Germany) ADAC Opel Rallye Junior Team	Opel Corsa Rally4	Driver, co-driver, ERC4, ERC Junior, team	HK
46	(Estonia) Jaspar Vaher	(Estonia) Sander Pruul	Team Estonia Autosport	Lancia Ypsilon Rally4 HF	Driver, co-driver, ERC4, ERC Junior, team	HK
47	(Republic of Ireland) Craig Rahill	(Republic of Ireland) Conor Smith	(Republic of Ireland) Motorsport Ireland Rally Academy	Peugeot 208 Rally4	Driver, co-driver, ERC4, ERC Junior, team	HK
48	(United Kingdom) Ioan Lloyd	(United Kingdom) Sion Williams	(United Kingdom) Ioan Lloyd	Peugeot 208 Rally4	Driver, co-driver, ERC4, ERC Junior	HK
49	(Italy) Tommaso Sandrin	(Italy) Andrea Dal Maso	(Italy) Tommaso Sandrin	Peugeot 208 Rally4	Driver, co-driver, ERC4, ERC Junior	HK
50	(Italy) Matteo Doretto	(Italy) Andrea Budoia	(Italy) Matteo Doretto	Peugeot 208 Rally4	Driver, co-driver, ERC4, ERC Junior	HK
51	(Austria) Luca Pröglhöf	(Germany) Christina Ettel	(Germany) ADAC Opel Rallye Junior Team	Opel Corsa Rally4	Driver, co-driver, ERC4, ERC Junior, team	HK
52	(Sweden) Victor Hansen	(Denmark) Ditte Kammersgaard	(Sweden) Victor Hansen	Peugeot 208 Rally4	Driver, co-driver, ERC4, ERC Junior	HK
53	(Belgium) Maxim Decock	(Belgium) Tom Buyse	(Belgium) Maxim Decock	Opel Corsa Rally4	Driver, co-driver, ERC4, ERC Junior	HK
54	(Republic of Ireland) Keelan Grogan	(Republic of Ireland) Ayrton Sherlock	(Republic of Ireland) Motorsport Ireland Rally Academy	Peugeot 208 Rally4	Driver, co-driver, ERC4, ERC Junior, team	HK
55	(Estonia) Mark-Egert Tilts	(Estonia) Rainis Raidma	Team Estonia Autosport	Ford Fiesta Rally4	Driver, co-driver, ERC4, ERC Junior, team	HK
56	(Republic of Ireland) Aoife Raftery	(Republic of Ireland) Hannah McKillop	(Hungary) HRT Racing Kft.	Peugeot 208 Rally4	Driver, co-driver, ERC4, ERC Junior, team	HK
57	(Estonia) Kevin Lempu	(Estonia) Fredi Kostikov	Team Estonia Autosport	Ford Fiesta Rally4	Driver, co-driver, ERC4, ERC Junior, team	HK
58 (Note: Withdrawn before the start.)	(Germany) Timo Schulz	(Germany) Michael Wenzel	(Germany) Timo Schulz	Opel Corsa Rally4	Driver, co-driver, ERC4, ERC Junior	HK
59	(Italy) Francesco Dei Ceci	(Italy) Nicolò Lazzarini	(Italy) Francesco Dei Ceci	Peugeot 208 Rally4	Driver, co-driver, ERC4, ERC Junior	HK
60	(Finland) Leevi Lassila	(Finland) Antti Linnaketo	(Slovenia) IK Sport Racing	Opel Corsa Rally4	Driver, co-driver, ERC4, ERC Junior, team	HK
61	(Finland) Tuukka Kauppinen	(Finland) Veli-Pekka Karttunen	(Finland) Tuukka Kauppinen	Lancia Ypsilon Rally4 HF	Driver, co-driver, ERC4, ERC Junior	HK
62	(Romania) Artur Luca	(Romania) Mihai Supuran	(Romania) Artur Luca	Renault Clio Rally5	Driver, co-driver, ERC4, ERC Junior	HK
63	(Romania) Cristian Sugár	(Romania) Vlad Colceriu	(Romania) Cristian Sugár	Opel Corsa Rally4	Driver, co-driver, ERC4, ERC Junior	HK
64	(Romania) Mihnea Hanea	(Romania) Natalie Hanea	(Hungary) HRT Racing Kft.	Peugeot 208 Rally4	Driver, co-driver, ERC4, ERC Junior, team	HK
65	(Germany) Tom Kässer	(Germany) Stephan Schneeweiß	(Germany) Tom Kässer	Peugeot 208 Rally4	Driver, co-driver, ERC4	P
66	(Germany) Norman Kreuter	(Denmark) Jeannette Kvick Andersson	(Germany) Norman Kreuter	Peugeot 208 Rally4	Driver, co-driver, ERC4, Master ERC	P
Other important entries
70	(Hungary) Róbert Bútor	(Hungary) Róbert Tagai	(Hungary) Dunakanyar Autós SE	Citroën C3 WRC	/	P

== Rally report ==
=== ERC Rally2 ===
==== Final classification ====
Position		No.	Driver	Co-driver	Entrant	Car	Tyre	Time	Difference	Points	
Class	Event	No.	Driver	Co-driver	Entrant	Car	Tyre	Time	Difference	Event	Power Stage
1	1	1	(Finland) Roope Korhonen	(Finland) Anssi Viinikka	(India) Team MRF Tyres	Toyota GR Yaris Rally2	MR	1:50:30.7	—N/a	30	1
2	2		(Norway) Mads Østberg	(Norway) Torstein Eriksen	(Hungary) TRT Rally Team	Citroën C3 Rally2	MI	1:51:00.8	30.1	24	2
3	3	3	(Poland) Mikołaj Marczyk	(Poland) Szymon Gospodarczyk	(Poland) Mikołaj Marczyk	Škoda Fabia RS Rally2	MI	1:51:02.1	31.4	21	3
4	4	22	(Sweden) Isak Reiersen	(Sweden) Stefan Gustavsson	(Sweden) Isak Reiersen	Škoda Fabia RS Rally2	HK	1:53:12.2	2:41.5	19	
5	5	25	(Hungary) Gábor Német	(Hungary) Gergely Németh	(Hungary) Borsod Talent MSE	Škoda Fabia RS Rally2	P	1:55:48.3	5:17.6	17	
6	6	23	(Romania) Norbert Maior	(Romania) Francesca Maria Maior	(Romania) Norbert Maior	Citroën C3 Rally2	HK	1:55:52.6	5:21.9	15	
7	7	27	(Hungary) Sándor „Sasa” Ollé	(Hungary) Rebeka Ollé	(Hungary) Treff-Autóház Kft.	Škoda Fabia Rally2 evo	P	1:57:04.6	6:33.9	13	
8	8	7	(Netherlands) Jos Verstappen	(Belgium) Renaud Jamoul	(Netherlands) Jos Verstappen	Škoda Fabia RS Rally2	P	1:57:30.8	7:00.1	11	
9	9	16	(Hungary) Norbert Herczig	(Hungary) Ramón Ferencz	(Hungary) Proformance Service Kft Team Staff House	Škoda Fabia RS Rally2	P	1:58:55.2	8:24.5	9	
10	10	9	(Republic of Ireland) Jon Armstrong	(Republic of Ireland) Shane Byrne	(United Kingdom) M-Sport Ford WRT	Ford Fiesta Rally2	P	1:59:13.1	8:42.4	7	4
11	11	26	(Hungary) Antal Kovács	(Hungary) Richárd Csáki	(Hungary) Pécsi Sport Nonprofit Zrt.	Hyundai i20 N Rally2	HK	2:01:02.3	10:31.6	5	
12	14	17	(Czech Republic) Martin Vlček	(Czech Republic) Jakub Kunst	(Czech Republic) Kowax DST Racing	Hyundai i20 N Rally2	P	2:02:42.6	12:11.9	2	
13	18	29	(Czech Republic) David Tomek	(Czech Republic) Vítězslav Baďura	(Czech Republic) Top Trans Highway s.r.o.	Škoda Fabia Rally2 evo	HK	2:04:07.8	13:37.1		
14	19	30	(Poland) Tomasz Ociepa	(Poland) Paweł Pochroń	(Poland) Tradepol Rally Team	Škoda Fabia Rally2 evo	P	2:07:08.3	16:37.6		
15	20	28	(Hungary) Miklós Bujdos	(Hungary) Tamás Csontos	(Hungary) Ba-Ro Motorsport	Škoda Fabia RS Rally2	HK	2:07:11.9	16:41.2		
16	25	18	(Poland) Dariusz Biedrzyński	(Poland) Rafał Fiołek	(Czech Republic) Kowax DST Racing	Hyundai i20 N Rally2	P	2:10:41.3	20:10.6		
17	32	14	(United Kingdom) Philip Allen	(United Kingdom) Craig Drew	(United Kingdom) Philip Allen	Škoda Fabia RS Rally2	MI	2:17:19.1	26:48.4	0	5
18	38	20	(Hungary) Miklós Csomós	(Hungary) Attila Nagy	(India) Team MRF Tyres	Citroën C3 Rally2	MR	2:33:39.1	43:08.4		
Retired SS13		5	(Poland) Jakub Matulka	(Poland) Daniel Dymurski	(Poland) Jakub Matulka	Škoda Fabia RS Rally2	MI	Accident damage			
Retired SS13		21	(United Kingdom) Max McRae	(United Kingdom) Cameron Fair	(India) Team MRF Tyres	Citroën C3 Rally2	MR	Rear suspension			
Retired SS12		2	(Italy) Andrea Mabellini	(Italy) Virginia Lenzi	(Italy) Andrea Mabellini	Škoda Fabia RS Rally2	P	Suspension			
Retired SS12		6	(Spain) Roberto Blach Jr.	(Spain) Mauro Barreiro	(Spain) Roberto Blach Jr.	Škoda Fabia RS Rally2	P	Retired			
Retired SS11		10	(Romania) Simone Tempestini	(Romania) Sergiu Itu	(India) Team MRF Tyres	Škoda Fabia RS Rally2	MR	Rear suspension			
Retired SS10		11	(Czech Republic) Dominik Stříteský	(Slovakia) Igor Bacigál	(Czech Republic) Auto Podbabská Škoda PSG ACCR Team	Škoda Fabia RS Rally2	MI	Lost wheel			
Retired SS10		12	(Hungary) Martin László	(Hungary) Viktor Bán	(Hungary) Topp-Cars Rally Team	Škoda Fabia RS Rally2	MI	Accident			
Retired SS9		24	(Romania) Bogdan Cuzma	(Romania) Marc Banca	(Romania) Bogdan Cuzma	Škoda Fabia RS Rally2	MI	Off-road			
Retired SS8		8	(Hungary) András Hadik	(Hungary) István Juhász	(Hungary) B-A Promotion Kft.	Ford Fiesta Rally2	P	Did not start leg 3			
Retired SS5		15	(Poland) Jarosław Kołtun	(Poland) Ireneusz Pleskot	(Poland) J2X Rally Team	Škoda Fabia RS Rally2	MI	Accident			
Retired SS4		19	(Hungary) Frigyes Turán	(Hungary) Gábor Zsiros	(Hungary) Turán Motorsport SE	Škoda Fabia RS Rally2	HK	Accident			

=== ERC3 ===
==== Final classification ====
Position		No.	Driver	Co-driver	Entrant	Car	Tyre	Time	Difference	Points
Class	Event	No.	Driver	Co-driver	Entrant	Car	Tyre	Time	Difference	Points
1	12	35	(Poland) Igor Widłak	(Poland) Daniel Dymurski	(Poland) Grupa PGS RT	Ford Fiesta Rally3	P	2:02:16.9	—N/a	30
2	13	41	(Hungary) Márton Bertalan	(Hungary) Róbert Paizs	(Hungary) OLP Motorsport Kft.	Ford Fiesta Rally3	P	2:02:34.1	17.2	24
3	15	36	(Poland) Hubert Kowalczyk	(Poland) Jarosław Hryniuk	(Poland) Hubert Kowalczyk	Renault Clio Rally3	P	2:03:20.7	1:03.8	21
4	16	42	(Finland) Ville Vatanen	(Finland) Jarno Ottman	(Finland) Ville Vatanen	Renault Clio Rally3	MI	2:03:43.4	1:26.5	19
5	22	39	(Poland) Błażej Gazda	(Poland) Michał Jurgała	(Poland) Błażej Gazda	Renault Clio Rally3	P	2:08:36.8	6:19.9	17
6	27	31	(France) Tristan Charpentier	(France) Florian Barral	(France) Tristan Charpentier	Ford Fiesta Rally3	P	2:12:03.9	9:47.0	15
7	31	43	(Estonia) Esmar-Arnold Unt	(Romania) Denisa-Alexia Parteni	(Estonia) CRC Rally Team	Ford Fiesta Rally3	P	2:17:05.8	14:48.9	13
8	36	33	(Poland) Tymoteusz Abramowski	(Poland) Grzegorz Dachowski	(Poland) Tymoteusz Abramowski	Ford Fiesta Rally3	P	2:27:24.2	25:07.3	11
9	39	32	(Poland) Adrian Rzeźnik	(Poland) Kamil Kozdroń	(Poland) Adrian Rzeźnik	Ford Fiesta Rally3	P	3:01:44.0	59:27.1	9
Retired SS10		34	(Croatia) Martin Ravenščak	(Croatia) Dora Ravenščak	(Slovenia) IK Sport Racing	Ford Fiesta Rally3	P	Technical		
Retired SS10		40	(Sweden) Adam Grahn	(Sweden) Christoffer Bäck	(Sweden) Adam Grahn	Ford Fiesta Rally3	P	Technical		
Retired SS9		37	(Republic of Ireland) Casey Jay Coleman	(Republic of Ireland) Killian McArdle	(Republic of Ireland) Casey Jay Coleman	Ford Fiesta Rally3	P	Technical		
Retired SS8		38	(Poland) Sebastian Butyński	(Poland) Łukasz Jastrzębski	(Poland) Sebastian Butyński	Renault Clio Rally3	P	Did not start leg 3		

=== ERC4 ===
==== Final classification ====
Position		No.	Driver	Co-driver	Entrant	Car	Tyre	Time	Difference	Points
Class	Event	No.	Driver	Co-driver	Entrant	Car	Tyre	Time	Difference	Points
1	17	45	(Sweden) Calle Carlberg	(Norway) Jørgen Eriksen	(Germany) ADAC Opel Rallye Junior Team	Opel Corsa Rally4	HK	2:03:47.6	—N/a	30
2	21	52	(Sweden) Victor Hansen	(Denmark) Ditte Kammersgaard	(Sweden) Victor Hansen	Peugeot 208 Rally4	HK	2:08:23.3	4:35.7	24
3	23	50	(Italy) Matteo Doretto	(Italy) Andrea Budoia	(Italy) Matteo Doretto	Peugeot 208 Rally4	HK	2:09:07.8	5:20.2	21
4	24	46	(Estonia) Jaspar Vaher	(Estonia) Sander Pruul	Team Estonia Autosport	Lancia Ypsilon Rally4 HF	HK	2:09:57.3	6:09.7	19
5	26	48	(United Kingdom) Ioan Lloyd	(United Kingdom) Sion Williams	(United Kingdom) Ioan Lloyd	Peugeot 208 Rally4	HK	2:12:02.2	8:14.6	17
6	28	60	(Finland) Leevi Lassila	(Finland) Antti Linnaketo	(Slovenia) IK Sport Racing	Opel Corsa Rally4	HK	2:13:37.2	9:49.6	15
7	29	66	(Germany) Norman Kreuter	(Denmark) Jeannette Kvick Andersson	(Germany) Norman Kreuter	Peugeot 208 Rally4	P	2:13:52.7	10:05.1	13
8	30	56	(Republic of Ireland) Aoife Raftery	(Republic of Ireland) Hannah McKillop	(Hungary) HRT Racing Kft.	Peugeot 208 Rally4	HK	2:15:59.1	12:11.5	11
9	33	57	(Estonia) Kevin Lempu	(Estonia) Fredi Kostikov	Team Estonia Autosport	Ford Fiesta Rally4	HK	2:18:30.0	14:42.4	9
10	34	44	(Spain) Sergi Pérez Jr.	(Spain) Axel Coronado	(Spain) RACC Motorsport	Peugeot 208 Rally4	HK	2:19:52.4	16:04.8	7
11	35	54	(Republic of Ireland) Keelan Grogan	(Republic of Ireland) Ayrton Sherlock	(Republic of Ireland) Motorsport Ireland Rally Academy	Peugeot 208 Rally4	HK	2:26:49.9	23:02.3	5
12	37	51	(Austria) Luca Pröglhöf	(Germany) Christina Ettel	(Germany) ADAC Opel Rallye Junior Team	Opel Corsa Rally4	HK	2:32:40.3	28:52.7	4
13	40	61	(Finland) Tuukka Kauppinen	(Finland) Veli-Pekka Karttunen	(Finland) Tuukka Kauppinen	Lancia Ypsilon Rally4 HF	HK	3:07:27.9	1:03:40.3	3
14	41	62	(Romania) Artur Luca	(Romania) Mihai Supuran	(Romania) Artur Luca	Renault Clio Rally5	HK	3:13:02.5	1:09:14.9	2
Retired SS10		53	(Belgium) Maxim Decock	(Belgium) Tom Buyse	(Belgium) Maxim Decock	Opel Corsa Rally4	HK	Gearbox		
Retired SS8		47	(Republic of Ireland) Craig Rahill	(Republic of Ireland) Conor Smith	(Republic of Ireland) Motorsport Ireland Rally Academy	Peugeot 208 Rally4	HK	Technical		
Retired SS8		63	(Romania) Cristian Sugár	(Romania) Vlad Colceriu	(Romania) Cristian Sugár	Opel Corsa Rally4	HK	Did not start leg 3		
Retired SS8		64	(Romania) Mihnea Hanea	(Romania) Natalie Hanea	(Hungary) HRT Racing Kft.	Peugeot 208 Rally4	HK	Did not start leg 3		
Retired SS5		65	(Germany) Tom Kässer	(Germany) Stephan Schneeweiß	(Germany) Tom Kässer	Peugeot 208 Rally4	P	Accident		
Retired SS3		49	(Italy) Tommaso Sandrin	(Italy) Andrea Dal Maso	(Italy) Tommaso Sandrin	Peugeot 208 Rally4	HK	Off-road		
Retired SS3		59	(Italy) Francesco Dei Ceci	(Italy) Nicolò Lazzarini	(Italy) Francesco Dei Ceci	Peugeot 208 Rally4	HK	Retired		
Retired SS2		55	(Estonia) Mark-Egert Tilts	(Estonia) Rainis Raidma	Team Estonia Autosport	Ford Fiesta Rally4	HK	Accident		
