= 2025 Rally Poland =

6th edition of Rally Hungary

Round 4 of 8 in the 2025 European Rally Championship
← Previous event	Next event →
- Host country: Poland
- Rally base: Mikołajki, Warmian-Masurian Voivodeship
- Dates run: 13 June 2025 – 15 June 2025
- Stages: 14 (190.40 km; 118.31 miles)
- Stage surface: Gravel
- Transport distance: 610.25 km (379.19 miles)
- Overall distance: 800.65 km (497.50 miles)

Statistics
- Crews registered: 74 (63 in ERC)
- Crews: TBA at start, TBA at finish

Overall results
- Overall winner: TBA; TBA; TBA; TBA
- Power Stage winner: TBA; TBA; TBA; TBA

The 2025 ORLEN OIL Rally Poland – Rajd Polski was a motor racing event held over three days from 13 June to 15 June 2025. It marked the 81st running of Rally Poland. It was the fourth round of the 2025 ERC and the third round of the Polish Rally Championship.

The event was marred by the death of ERC Junior competitor Matteo Doretto, who died on 11 June after crashing his Peugeot 208 Rally4 into a tree during a pre-event test. The accident happened on a closed road between Elganowo and Pasym. Doretto's co-driver Samuele Pellegrino was uninjured.

== Event background ==
=== Event itinerary ===
Date	No.	Time	Stage name	Distance
13 June	—	10:30	Free practice (Baranowo)	6.30 km
13 June	—	13:01	Shakedown (Baranowo)	6.30 km
13 June	—	14:00	Qualifying Stage (Baranowo)	6.30 km
13 June	SS1	19:00	Mikołajki Arena 1	2.50 km
14 June	SS2	10:00	Świętajno 1	16.30 km
14 June	SS3	10:50	Olecko 1	20.00 km
14 June	SS4	11:40	Stare Juchy 1	13.60 km
14 June	SS5	15:30	Świętajno 2	16.30 km
14 June	SS6	16:20	Olecko 2	20.00 km
14 June	SS7	17:10	Stare Juchy 2	13.60 km
14 June	SS8	19:00	Mikołajki Arena 2	2.50 km
15 June	SS9	8:00	Mikołajki 1	7.60 km
15 June	SS10	9:05	Pozezdrze 1	20.00 km
15 June	SS11	10:35	Gmina Mrągowo 1	15.20 km
15 June	SS12	12:40	Mikołajki 2	7.60 km
15 June	SS13	13:45	Pozezdrze 2	20.00 km
15 June	SS14	16:05	Gmina Mrągowo 2	15.20 km

=== Entry list ===
A total of 74 crews entered the event, with 63 contesting in ERC and 16 entered into PZM Polish Rally Championship. Dakar Rally podium finisher, WRC driver and three-time Polish champion Krzysztof Hołowczyc drove a Škoda Fabia RS Rally2 as a course car.

ERC Rally2 entries
No.	Driver	Co-Driver	Entrant	Car	Championship eligibility	Tyre
1	(Finland) Roope Korhonen	(Finland) Anssi Viinikka	(India) Team MRF Tyres	Toyota GR Yaris Rally2	Driver, co-driver, team	MR
2	(Latvia) Mārtiņš Sesks	(Latvia) Renārs Francis	(India) Team MRF Tyres	Škoda Fabia RS Rally2	Driver, co-driver, team	MR
3	(Poland) Mikołaj Marczyk	(Poland) Szymon Gospodarczyk	(Poland) Mikołaj Marczyk	Škoda Fabia RS Rally2	Driver, co-driver	MI
4 (Note: Lucas Karlsson appeared as the co-driver on the original entry list.)	(Norway) Mads Østberg	(Italy) Giovanni Bernacchini	(Hungary) TRT Rally Team	Citroën C3 Rally2	Driver, co-driver, team	MI
5	(Italy) Andrea Mabellini	(Italy) Virginia Lenzi	(Italy) Andrea Mabellini	Škoda Fabia RS Rally2	Driver, co-driver	P
6	(Sweden) Isak Reiersen	(Sweden) Stefan Gustavsson	(Sweden) Isak Reiersen	Škoda Fabia RS Rally2	Driver, co-driver	HK
7	(Sweden) Mille Johansson	(Sweden) Johan Grönvall	(Sweden) Mille Johansson	Škoda Fabia RS Rally2	Driver, co-driver	HK
8	(Republic of Ireland) Jon Armstrong	(Republic of Ireland) Shane Byrne	(United Kingdom) M-Sport Ford WRT	Ford Fiesta Rally2	Driver, co-driver, team	P
9	(Netherlands) Jos Verstappen	(Belgium) Renaud Jamoul	(Netherlands) Jos Verstappen	Škoda Fabia RS Rally2	Driver, co-driver	P
10	(France) Stéphane Lefebvre	(France) Andy Malfoy	(India) MRF Tyres Dealer Team	Toyota GR Yaris Rally2	Driver, co-driver, team	MR
11	(Hungary) Sasa Ollé	(Hungary) Rebeka Ollé	(Hungary) Treff-Autóház Kft.	Škoda Fabia Rally2 evo	Driver, co-driver, team	P
12	(Romania) Simone Tempestini	(Romania) Sergiu Itu	(India) Team MRF Tyres	Škoda Fabia RS Rally2	Driver, co-driver, team	MR
14	(Poland) Jakub Matulka	(Poland) Damian Syty	(Poland) Jakub Matulka	Škoda Fabia RS Rally2	Driver, co-driver	MI
15	(United Kingdom) Philip Allen	(United Kingdom) Craig Drew	(United Kingdom) Philip Allen	Škoda Fabia RS Rally2	Driver, co-driver	MI
16	(Spain) Roberto Blach Jr	(Spain) Mauro Barreiro	(Spain) Roberto Blach Jr	Škoda Fabia RS Rally2	Driver, co-driver	P
17	(Czech Republic) Martin Vlček	(Czech Republic) Jakub Kunst	(Czech Republic) Kowax DST Racing	Hyundai i20 N Rally2	Driver, co-driver, Master ERC, team	P
18	(Hungary) András Hadik	(Hungary) István Juhász	(Hungary) B-A Promotion Kft.	Ford Fiesta Rally2	Driver, co-driver, Master ERC, team	P
19	(United Kingdom) Max McRae	(United Kingdom) Cameron Fair	(India) MRF Tyres Dealer Team	Citroën C3 Rally2	Driver, co-driver, team	MR
20	(Hungary) Martin László	(Hungary) Viktor Bán	(Hungary) Topp-Cars Rally Team	Škoda Fabia RS Rally2	Driver, co-driver, team	MI
21	(Poland) Jarosław Szeja	(Poland) Marcin Szeja	(Hungary) Turán Motorsport SE	Škoda Fabia RS Rally2	Driver, co-driver, team	MI
22	(Poland) Grzegorz Grzyb	(Poland) Adam Binięda	(Poland) Grzegorz Grzyb	Škoda Fabia RS Rally2	Driver, co-driver	P
23	(Poland) Jakub Brzeziński	(Poland) Jakub Gerber	(Poland) IS Racing	Citroën C3 Rally2	Driver, co-driver	P
24	(Poland) Jarosław Kołtun	(Poland) Ireneusz Pleskot	(Poland) J2X Rally Team	Škoda Fabia RS Rally2	Driver, co-driver, team	MI
25	(Poland) Zbigniew Gabryś	(Poland) Daniel Dymurski	(Poland) J2X Rally Team	Škoda Fabia RS Rally2	Driver, co-driver, Master ERC, team	MI
26	(Poland) Łukasz Byśkiniewicz	(Poland) Daniel Siatkowski	(Czech Republic) Kowax DST Racing	Škoda Fabia Rally2 evo	Driver, co-driver	MI
27	(Poland) Krzysztof Bubik	(Poland) Adrian Sadowski	(Hungary) Pécsi Sport Nonprofit Zrt.	Škoda Fabia Rally2 evo	Driver, co-driver, team	P
28	(Poland) Piotr Krotoszyński	(Poland) Łukasz Jastrzębski	(Hungary) Borsod Talent MSE	Škoda Fabia Rally2 evo	Driver, co-driver, team	P
29	(Czech Republic) David Tomek	(Czech Republic) Vítězslav Baďura	(Czech Republic) Top Trans Highway s.r.o.	Škoda Fabia Rally2 evo	Driver, co-driver	HK
30	(Poland) Tomasz Ociepa	(Poland) Paweł Pochroń	(Poland) Tradepol Rally Team	Škoda Fabia Rally2 evo	Driver, co-driver, Master ERC, team	P
31	(Poland) Dariusz Biedrzyński	(Poland) Rafał Fiołek	(Czech Republic) Kowax DST Racing	Hyundai i20 N Rally2	Driver, co-driver, Master ERC, team	P
32	(Poland) Wojciech Musiał	(Poland) Konrad Dudziński	(Poland) Wojciech Musiał	Škoda Fabia Rally2 evo	Driver, co-driver, Master ERC	P
33	(France) Tristan Charpentier	(France) Florian Barral	(France) Tristan Charpentier	Ford Fiesta Rally3	Driver, co-driver, ERC3, Fiesta Rally3 Trophy	P
34	(Poland) Igor Widłak	(Poland) Michał Marczewski	(Poland) Grupa PGS RT	Ford Fiesta Rally3	Driver, co-driver, ERC3, Fiesta Rally3 Trophy, team	P
35	(Poland) Tymoteusz Abramowski	(Poland) Jakub Wróbel	(Poland) Tymoteusz Abramowski	Ford Fiesta Rally3	Driver, co-driver, ERC3, Fiesta Rally3 Trophy	P
36	(Poland) Adrian Rzeźnik	(Poland) Kamil Kozdroń	(Poland) Adrian Rzeźnik	Ford Fiesta Rally3	Driver, co-driver, ERC3, Fiesta Rally3 Trophy	P
37	(Finland) Ville Vatanen	(Finland) Jarno Ottman	(Finland) Ville Vatanen	Renault Clio Rally3	Driver, co-driver, ERC3	MI
38	(Poland) Błażej Gazda	(Poland) Michał Jurgała	(Poland) Błażej Gazda	Renault Clio Rally3	Driver, co-driver, ERC3	P
39	(Poland) Hubert Kowalczyk	(Poland) Jarosław Hryniuk	(Poland) Hubert Kowalczyk	Renault Clio Rally3	Driver, co-driver, ERC3	P
40	(Estonia) Esmar-Arnold Unt	(Romania) Denisa-Alexia Parteni	(Estonia) CRC Rally Team	Ford Fiesta Rally3	Driver, co-driver, ERC3, Fiesta Rally3 Trophy, team	P
41	(Republic of Ireland) Casey Jay Coleman	(Republic of Ireland) Killian McArdle	(Republic of Ireland) Casey Jay Coleman	Ford Fiesta Rally3	Driver, co-driver, ERC3, Fiesta Rally3 Trophy	P
42	(Sweden) Adam Grahn	(Sweden) Christoffer Bäck	(Sweden) Adam Grahn	Ford Fiesta Rally3	Driver, co-driver, ERC3, Fiesta Rally3 Trophy	P
43	(Poland) Adam Sroka	(Poland) Patryk Kielar	(Poland) Adam Sroka	Ford Fiesta Rally3	Driver, co-driver, ERC3, Fiesta Rally3 Trophy	P
44	(Poland) Adrian Łabuda	(Poland) Michał Kuśnierz	(Poland) Adrian Łabuda	Ford Fiesta Rally3	Driver, co-driver, ERC3, Fiesta Rally3 Trophy	P
45	(Poland) Tadeusz Bieńko	(Poland) Szymon Marciniak	(Poland) Tadeusz Bieńko	Ford Fiesta Rally3	Driver, co-driver, ERC3, Fiesta Rally3 Trophy	P
46	(Sweden) Calle Carlberg	(Norway) Jørgen Eriksen	(Germany) ADAC Opel Rallye Junior Team	Opel Corsa Rally4	Driver, co-driver, ERC4, Junior ERC, team	HK
47	(Estonia) Jaspar Vaher	(Estonia) Sander Pruul	Team Estonia Autosport	Lancia Ypsilon Rally4 HF	Driver, co-driver, ERC4, Junior ERC	HK
48	(Spain) Sergi Pérez Jr.	(Spain) Axel Coronado	(Spain) RACC Motorsport	Peugeot 208 Rally4	Driver, co-driver, ERC4, Junior ERC	HK
49 (Note: Driver Matteo Doretto died in an accident during the pre-event test.)	(Italy) Matteo Doretto	(Italy) Samuele Pellegrino	(Italy) Matteo Doretto	Peugeot 208 Rally4	Driver, co-driver, ERC4, Junior ERC	HK
50	(United Kingdom) Ioan Lloyd	(United Kingdom) Sion Williams	(United Kingdom) Ioan Lloyd	Peugeot 208 Rally4	Driver, co-driver, ERC4, Junior ERC	HK
51	(Sweden) Victor Hansen	(Denmark) Ditte Kammersgaard	(Sweden) Victor Hansen	Peugeot 208 Rally4	Driver, co-driver, ERC4, Junior ERC	HK
52	(Republic of Ireland) Craig Rahill	(Republic of Ireland) Conor Smith	(Republic of Ireland) Motorsport Ireland Rally Academy	Peugeot 208 Rally4	Driver, co-driver, ERC4, Junior ERC	HK
53 (Note: Withdrawn before the event.)	(Austria) Luca Pröglhöf	(Germany) Christina Ettel	(Germany) ADAC Opel Rallye Junior Team	Opel Corsa Rally4	Driver, co-driver, ERC4, Junior ERC	HK
54	(Finland) Leevi Lassila	(Finland) Antti Linnaketo	(Slovenia) IK Sport Racing	Opel Corsa Rally4	Driver, co-driver, ERC4, Junior ERC	HK
55	(Italy) Tommaso Sandrin	(Italy) Andrea Dal Maso	(Italy) Tommaso Sandrin	Peugeot 208 Rally4	Driver, co-driver, ERC4, Junior ERC	HK
56	(Republic of Ireland) Aoife Raftery	(Republic of Ireland) Hannah McKillop	(Hungary) HRT Racing Kft.	Peugeot 208 Rally4	Driver, co-driver, ERC4, Junior ERC	HK
57	(Republic of Ireland) Keelan Grogan	(Republic of Ireland) Ayrton Sherlock	(Republic of Ireland) Motorsport Ireland Rally Academy	Peugeot 208 Rally4	Driver, co-driver, ERC4, Junior ERC	HK
58	(Sweden) Simon Andersson	(Sweden) Jörgen Jönsson	(Sweden) Simon Andersson	Opel Corsa Rally4	Driver, co-driver, ERC4, Junior ERC	HK
59	(Finland) Tuukka Kauppinen	(Finland) Veli-Pekka Karttunen	(Finland) Tuukka Kauppinen	Lancia Ypsilon Rally4 HF	Driver, co-driver, ERC4, Junior ERC	HK
60	(Belgium) Maxim Decock	(Belgium) Tom Buyse	(Belgium) Maxim Decock	Opel Corsa Rally4	Driver, co-driver, ERC4, Junior ERC	HK
61	(Romania) Artur Luca	(Romania) Vlad Colceriu	(Romania) Artur Luca	Renault Clio Rally5	Driver, co-driver, ERC4, Junior ERC	HK
62	(Estonia) Mark-Egert Tilts	(Estonia) Rainis Raidma	Team Estonia Autosport	Ford Fiesta Rally4	Driver, co-driver, ERC4, Junior ERC	HK
63	(Italy) Francesco Dei Ceci	(Italy) Nicolò Lazzarini	(Italy) Francesco Dei Ceci	Peugeot 208 Rally4	Driver, co-driver, ERC4, Junior ERC	HK
64	(Republic of Ireland) Brendan Cumiskey	(Republic of Ireland) Arthur Kierans	(Republic of Ireland) Brendan Cumiskey	Ford Fiesta Rally4	Driver, co-driver, ERC4	
