= 2025 European Rally Championship =

73rd season of the FIA European Rally Championship

The 2025 FIA European Rally Championship was the 73rd season of the European Rally Championship, a European continental rallying series in rallying organised by the Fédération Internationale de l'Automobile (FIA) and WRC Promoter GmbH. The season was also the twelfth following the merge between the European Rally Championship and the Intercontinental Rally Challenge.

Hayden Paddon and John Kennard were the reigning champions, having won their second European titles the previous season. They did not return to defend their titles as they focused on the Australian Rally Championship.

Mikołaj Marczyk and Szymon Gospodarczyk won their first European titles. Tymoteusz Abramowski and Jakub Wróbel won the ERC3 category, also finishing first in the Fiesta Rally3 Trophy. Calle Carlberg and Jørgen Eriksen won the ERC4 and Junior ERC categories. Martin Vlček won the Master ERC category. Team MRF Tyres claimed their third teams' championship title, while Pirelli finished first in the tyre suppliers' trophy.

The season was marred by the death of ERC Junior driver Matteo Doretto in a pre-event test prior to the 2025 Rally Poland.

== Categories ==
- FIA European Championship for Drivers, Co-Drivers and Teams: Main open championship for all current FIA-homologated cars within sporting classes RC2 to RC5, with Rally2 cars the leading contenders. A team may nominate a maximum of three cars (from all categories) for the teams' championship, with the two highest-placed cars counting for points.
- FIA ERC3 for Drivers and Co-Drivers: Second tier, specifically for the Rally3 class.
- FIA ERC4 for Drivers and Co-Drivers: Third tier, the first for front-wheel-drive cars. Allows Rally4 and Rally5 cars.
- FIA Junior ERC: For drivers aged 27 and under on 1 January 2025 in Rally4 and Rally5 cars.
- FIA Master ERC: for drivers over the age of 50 at the start of the season.
- FIA ERC Fiesta Rally3 Trophy: For crews driving the Ford Fiesta Rally3, with a funded drive with the Ford Fiesta Rally2 as the main prize.
- FIA Tyre Suppliers' Trophy: A nominated tyre supplier may score points with the two best placed Rally2 cars registered in ERC.

== Calendar ==
The 2025 season was contested over eight rounds across Central, Northern, Western and Southern Europe. The Junior ERC category was not contested in Sweden and Great Britain, while the Fiesta Rally3 Trophy was not contested in Sweden, Great Britain and Croatia.

Round	Start date	Finish date	Rally	Rally headquarters	Surface	Stages	Distance	Ref.
1	4 April	6 April	(Spain) Rally Sierra Morena	Córdoba, Andalucia, Spain	Tarmac	13	209.96 km	
2	9 May	11 May	Rally Hungary	Veszprém, Veszprém County, Hungary	Gravel	13	191.01 km	
3	29 May	31 May	(Sweden) Royal Rally of Scandinavia	Karlstad, Värmland County, Sweden	Gravel	17	185.35 km	
4	13 June	15 June	Rally Poland	Mikołajki, Warmian-Masurian Voivodeship, Poland	Gravel	14	190.40 km	
5	4 July	6 July	(Italy) Rally di Roma Capitale	Fiuggi, Lazio, Italy	Tarmac	13	207.82 km	
6	15 August	17 August	(Czech Republic) Barum Czech Rally Zlín	Zlín, Zlín Region, Czechia	Tarmac	13	207.49 km	
7	5 September	7 September	(United Kingdom) Rali Ceredigion	Aberystwyth, Ceredigion, Wales	Tarmac	12	185.24 km	
8	3 October	5 October	Croatia Rally	Zagreb, Croatia	Tarmac	10	180.72 km	

=== Calendar overview ===
- Rally Islas Canarias, which has been part of the ERC calendar since 2016 and previously was part of Intercontinental Rally Challenge, stepped up to WRC for 2025. Rally Sierra Morena was added to the calendar instead.
- Rally Estonia was removed from the calendar as it returned to WRC.
- Rally Poland returned to the calendar after a one-off WRC appearance in 2024, with Rally Silesia effectively removed.
- Croatia Rally returned to the calendar for the first time since 2013. It was moved from April, when it took place while part of WRC, to October.

== Entries ==
=== ERC ===
Rally2 entries
Entrant	Car	Driver	Co-Driver	Tyre	Rounds	Category
(Czech Republic) ACCR Toyota Dolák	Toyota GR Yaris Rally2	(Czech Republic) Filip Mareš	(Czech Republic) Radovan Bucha	H	6	
(Czech Republic) Agrotec Škoda Rally Team	Škoda Fabia RS Rally2	(Czech Republic) Jan Kopecký	(Czech Republic) Jiří Hovorka	M	6	
(Croatia) AK Opatija Motorsport	Škoda Fabia R5	(Croatia) Eris Marotti	(Croatia) Aleksandra Devunić	M	8	
(Czech Republic) Auto Podbabská Škoda PSG ACCR Team	Škoda Fabia RS Rally2	(Czech Republic) Dominik Stříteský	(Slovakia) Igor Bacigál	M	1–2	
(Czech Republic) Auto Podbabská Škoda PSG ACCR Team	Škoda Fabia RS Rally2	(Czech Republic) Dominik Stříteský	(Czech Republic) Ondřej Krajča	M	5	
(Czech Republic) Auto Podbabská Škoda PSG ACCR Team	Škoda Fabia RS Rally2	(Czech Republic) Dominik Stříteský	(Czech Republic) Ladislav Kučera	M	6	
(Czech Republic) Autospektrum Škoda Team	Škoda Fabia RS Rally2	(Czech Republic) Filip Kohn	(United Kingdom) Ross Whittock	P	6	
(Hungary) B-A Promotion Kft.	Ford Fiesta Rally2	(Hungary) András Hadik	(Hungary) István Juhász	P	1–2, 4–5	Master ERC
(Hungary) B-A Promotion Kft.	Škoda Fabia RS Rally2	(Hungary) András Hadik	(Hungary) István Juhász	P	8	Master ERC
(Hungary) Ba-Ro Motorsport	Škoda Fabia RS Rally2	(Hungary) Miklós Bujdos	(Hungary) Tamás Csontos	H	2	Master ERC
(Hungary) Borsod Talent MSE	Škoda Fabia Rally2 evo	(Poland) Piotr Krotoszyński	(Poland) Łukasz Jastrzębski	P	4	
(Hungary) Borsod Talent MSE	Škoda Fabia RS Rally2	(Hungary) Gábor Német	(Hungary) Gergely Németh	P	2	
(Hungary) Borsod Talent MSE	Škoda Fabia RS Rally2	(Hungary) Ferenc Vincze	(Hungary) Gergely Németh	P	8	
(Spain) Citroën Rally Team	Citroën C3 Rally2	(Spain) Unai de la Dehesa	(Spain) Daniel Sosa	P	1	
(Czech Republic) EuroOil Team	Citroën C3 Rally2	(Czech Republic) Václav Pech Jr.	(Czech Republic) Petr Uhel	P	5	
(Italy) F.P.F. Sport	Citroën C3 Rally2	(Italy) Andrea Crugnola	(Italy) Pietro Elia Ometto	P	5	
(Spain) Hyundai Motor España	Hyundai i20 N Rally2	(Spain) Pepe López	(Spain) David Vázquez	P	1	
(Poland) IS Racing	Citroën C3 Rally2	(Poland) Jakub Brzeziński	(Poland) Jakub Gerber	P	4	
(Poland) J2X Rally Team	Škoda Fabia RS Rally2	(Poland) Zbigniew Gabryś	(Poland) Daniel Dymurski	M	4	Master ERC
(Poland) J2X Rally Team	Škoda Fabia RS Rally2	(Bulgaria) Nikolay Gryazin	(Bulgaria) Konstantin Aleksandrov	M	1	
(Poland) J2X Rally Team	Škoda Fabia RS Rally2	(Poland) Jarosław Kołtun	(Poland) Ireneusz Pleskot	M	1–2, 4–6, 8 (Note: Appeared on the entry list for Barum Czech Rally Zlín, but withdrew before the start.)	
(Poland) J2X Rally Team	Škoda Fabia RS Rally2	(Czech Republic) Tomáš Kurka	(Czech Republic) Karel Vajík	M	6	Master ERC
(Poland) J2X Rally Team	Škoda Fabia RS Rally2	(Finland) Emil Lindholm	(Finland) Reeta Hämäläinen	—N/a	5 (Note: Appeared on the entry list for Rally di Roma Capitale, but withdrew before the start.)	
(Poland) J2X Rally Team	Hyundai i20 N Rally2	(United Kingdom) Osian Pryce	(Republic of Ireland) Andy Hayes	M	7	
(Czech Republic) Kowax DST Racing	Hyundai i20 N Rally2	(Poland) Dariusz Biedrzyński	(Poland) Rafał Fiołek	M	1	Master ERC
(Czech Republic) Kowax DST Racing	Hyundai i20 N Rally2	(Poland) Dariusz Biedrzyński	(Poland) Rafał Fiołek	P	2–6	Master ERC
(Czech Republic) Kowax DST Racing	Škoda Fabia Rally2 evo	(Poland) Łukasz Byśkiniewicz	(Poland) Daniel Siatkowski	M	4	
(Czech Republic) Kowax DST Racing	Hyundai i20 N Rally2	(Czech Republic) Erik Cais	(Czech Republic) Daniel Trunkát	M	6	
(Czech Republic) Kowax DST Racing	Škoda Fabia RS Rally2	(Poland) Piotr Krotoszyński	(France) Florian Barral	M	8	
(Czech Republic) Kowax DST Racing	Hyundai i20 N Rally2	(Slovenia) Rok Turk	(Slovenia) Blanka Kacin	M	8	
(Czech Republic) Kowax DST Racing	Hyundai i20 N Rally2	(Czech Republic) Martin Vlček	(Czech Republic) Jakub Kunst	P	1–4	Master ERC
(Czech Republic) Kowax DST Racing	Hyundai i20 N Rally2	(Czech Republic) Martin Vlček	(Czech Republic) Jakub Kunst	H	5	Master ERC
(Czech Republic) Kowax DST Racing	Hyundai i20 N Rally2	(Czech Republic) Martin Vlček	(Czech Republic) Jakub Kunst	M	8	Master ERC
(Czech Republic) Kowax DST Racing	Hyundai i20 N Rally2	(Czech Republic) Martin Vlček	(Czech Republic) Karolína Zubíčková	M	7	Master ERC
(Czech Republic) Kowax DST Racing	Škoda Fabia RS Rally2	(Czech Republic) Martin Vlček	(Czech Republic) Jakub Kunst	H	6	Master ERC
(Czech Republic) Kowax DST Racing	Hyundai i20 N Rally2	(Austria) Simon Wagner	(Germany) Hanna Ostlender	M	1, 5–6, 8	
(Republic of Ireland) Motorsport Ireland Rally Academy	Toyota GR Yaris Rally2	(Republic of Ireland) William Creighton	(Republic of Ireland) Liam Regan	M	7	
(India) MRF Tyres Dealer Team	Toyota GR Yaris Rally2	(France) Stéphane Lefebvre	(France) Andy Malfoy	M	3–4	
(India) MRF Tyres Dealer Team	Citroën C3 Rally2	(United Kingdom) Max McRae	(United Kingdom) Cameron Fair	M	3–6	
(United Kingdom) M-Sport Ford WRT	Ford Fiesta Rally2	(Republic of Ireland) Jon Armstrong	(Republic of Ireland) Shane Byrne	P	All	
(United Kingdom) M-Sport Ford WRT	Ford Fiesta Rally2	(Estonia) Romet Jürgenson	(Estonia) Siim Oja	P	7–8	
(United Kingdom) M-Sport Ford WRT	Ford Fiesta Rally2	(United Kingdom) Garry Pearson	(Republic of Ireland) Hannah McKillop	P	7	
(Italy) MT Racing SRL	Škoda Fabia RS Rally2	(Italy) Giovanni Trentin	(Italy) Pietro Elia Ometto	P	8	
(Spain) Past Racing	Ford Fiesta Rally2	(Spain) Daniel Alonso	(Spain) Rubén Arboleya	H	1	Master ERC
(Hungary) Pécsi Sport Nonprofit Zrt.	Škoda Fabia R5	(Poland) Krzysztof Bubik	(Poland) Adrian Sadowski	P	4	
(Hungary) Pécsi Sport Nonprofit Zrt.	Hyundai i20 N Rally2	(Hungary) Antal Kovács	(Hungary) Richárd Csáki	H	2, 8	
(Hungary) Proformance Service Kft Team Staff House	Ford Fiesta Rally2	(United Kingdom) Callum Black	(United Kingdom) Jack Morton	M	7	
(Hungary) Proformance Service Kft Team Staff House	Toyota GR Yaris Rally2	(Hungary) Norbert Herczig	(Hungary) Ramón Ferencz	P	1	
(Hungary) Proformance Service Kft Team Staff House	Škoda Fabia RS Rally2	(Hungary) Norbert Herczig	(Hungary) Ramón Ferencz	P	2, 5, 8	
(Spain) Recalvi Team	Škoda Fabia RS Rally2	(Spain) José Antonio Suárez	(Spain) Alberto Iglesias	M	1	
(Czech Republic) Samohýl Škoda Team	Škoda Fabia RS Rally2	(Czech Republic) Adam Březík	(Czech Republic) Ondřej Krajča	H	6	
(France) Sarrazin Motorsport – Iron Lynx	Citroën C3 Rally2	(France) Pablo Sarrazin	(France) Yannick Roche	M	8	
(India) Team MRF Tyres	Hyundai i20 N Rally2	(Czech Republic) Erik Cais	(Slovakia) Igor Bacigál	M	8	
(India) Team MRF Tyres	Citroën C3 Rally2	(Hungary) Miklós Csomós	(Hungary) Attila Nagy	M	2	
(India) Team MRF Tyres	Škoda Fabia RS Rally2	(Hungary) Miklós Csomós	(Hungary) Krisztián Kertész	M	6	
(India) Team MRF Tyres	Škoda Fabia RS Rally2	(Republic of Ireland) Callum Devine	(Republic of Ireland) Niall Burns	M	7	
(India) Team MRF Tyres	Škoda Fabia RS Rally2	(United Kingdom) Chris Ingram	(United Kingdom) Alex Kihurani	M	6	
(India) Team MRF Tyres	Škoda Fabia RS Rally2	(Finland) Lauri Joona	(Finland) Kristian Temonen	M	8	
(India) Team MRF Tyres	Toyota GR Yaris Rally2	(Finland) Benjamin Korhola	(Finland) Kristian Temonen	M	5	
(India) Team MRF Tyres	Toyota GR Yaris Rally2	(Finland) Roope Korhonen	(Finland) Anssi Viinikka	M	2–5	
(India) Team MRF Tyres	Volkswagen Polo GTI R5	(Norway) Frank Tore Larsen	(Norway) Lars-Håkon Lundgreen	M	3	
(India) Team MRF Tyres	Hyundai i20 N Rally2	(France) Stéphane Lefebvre	(France) Andy Malfoy	M	1	
(India) Team MRF Tyres	Toyota GR Yaris Rally2	(France) Stéphane Lefebvre	(France) Andy Malfoy	M	6	
(India) Team MRF Tyres	Citroën C3 Rally2	(United Kingdom) Max McRae	(United Kingdom) Cameron Fair	M	2, 7	
(India) Team MRF Tyres	Škoda Fabia RS Rally2	(Latvia) Mārtiņš Sesks	(Latvia) Renārs Francis	M	4	
(India) Team MRF Tyres	Toyota GR Yaris Rally2	(Spain) Jan Solans	(Spain) Rodrigo Sanjuan	M	5	
(India) Team MRF Tyres	Škoda Fabia RS Rally2	(Romania) Simone Tempestini	(Romania) Sergiu Itu	M	1–6, 8	
(India) Team MRF Tyres	Hyundai i20 N Rally2	(United Kingdom) James Williams	(United Kingdom) Ross Whittock	M	1	
(Hungary) Topp-Cars Rally Team	Škoda Fabia RS Rally2	(Hungary) Martin László	(Hungary) Viktor Bán	M	1–2, 4	
(Hungary) Topp-Cars Rally Team	Škoda Fabia RS Rally2	(Hungary) Zoltán László	(Hungary) György Kocsis	H	5	Master ERC
(Hungary) Topp-Cars Rally Team	Škoda Fabia RS Rally2	(Hungary) Zoltán László	(Hungary) György Kocsis	M	8	Master ERC
(Hungary) Topp-Cars Rally Team	Škoda Fabia RS Rally2	(Hungary) Zoltán László	(Hungary) Richárd Csáki	H	6	Master ERC
(Hungary) Topp-Cars Rally Team	Škoda Fabia RS Rally2	(Norway) Henning Solberg	(Belgium) Stéphane Prévot	P	3	Master ERC
(Czech Republic) Top Trans Highway s.r.o.	Škoda Fabia Rally2 evo	(Czech Republic) David Tomek	(Czech Republic) Vítězslav Baďura	H	2, 4–6	
(Japan) Toyota Gazoo Racing WRT NG	Toyota GR Yaris Rally2	(Japan) Yuki Yamamoto	(Republic of Ireland) James Fulton	H	8	
(Italy) T-Racing	Toyota GR Yaris Rally2	(Italy) Fabio Andolfi	(Switzerland) Marco Menchini	P	5	
(Poland) Tradepol Team	Škoda Fabia Rally2 evo	(Poland) Tomasz Ociepa	(Poland) Paweł Pochroń	P	2, 4	Master ERC
(Hungary) Treff-Autóház Kft.	Škoda Fabia Rally2 evo	(Hungary) Sasa Ollé	(Hungary) Rebeka Ollé	P	2, 4	Master ERC
(Hungary) Treff-Autóház Kft.	Škoda Fabia RS Rally2	(Hungary) Sasa Ollé	(Hungary) Rebeka Ollé	P	3	Master ERC
(Hungary) TRT Rally Team	Citroën C3 Rally2	(Norway) Mads Østberg	(Norway) Torstein Eriksen	M	1–2, 5	
(Hungary) TRT Rally Team	Citroën C3 Rally2	(Norway) Mads Østberg	(Sweden) Lucas Karlsson	M	3, 6	
(Hungary) TRT Rally Team	Citroën C3 Rally2	(Norway) Mads Østberg	(Italy) Giovanni Bernacchini	M	4	
(Hungary) TRT Rally Team	Citroën C3 Rally2	(Norway) Mads Østberg	(Republic of Ireland) Lorcan Moore	M	8	
(Hungary) Turán Motorsport SE	Toyota GR Yaris Rally2	(United Kingdom) Meirion Evans	(United Kingdom) Dale Furniss	P	7	
(Hungary) Turán Motorsport SE	Škoda Fabia Rally2 evo	(Poland) Piotr Krotoszyński	(Poland) Marcin Szeja	M	5	
(Hungary) Turán Motorsport SE	Škoda Fabia RS Rally2	(Poland) Jarosław Szeja	(Poland) Marcin Szeja	P	4	
(Hungary) Turán Motorsport SE	Škoda Fabia RS Rally2	(Hungary) Frigyes Turán	(Hungary) Gábor Zsiros	H	2	Master ERC
Private Rally2 entries
Entered under driver's name	Škoda Fabia RS Rally2	(United Kingdom) Philip Allen	(United Kingdom) Craig Drew	M	1–7	
Entered under driver's name	Škoda Fabia RS Rally2	(Italy) Boštjan Avbelj	(Italy) Elia De Guio	P	5	
Entered under driver's name	Škoda Fabia RS Rally2	(Italy) Giandomenico Basso	(Italy) Lorenzo Granai	P	5	Master ERC
Entered under driver's name	Škoda Fabia RS Rally2	(Spain) Roberto Blach Jr.	(Spain) Mauro Barreiro	P	1–2, 4–5	
Entered under driver's name	Toyota GR Yaris Rally2	(Spain) Roberto Blach Jr.	(Spain) Mauro Barreiro	P	8	
Entered under driver's name	Ford Fiesta Rally2	(Republic of Ireland) Eamonn Boland	(Republic of Ireland) Michael Joseph Morrissey	P	5, 7	Master ERC
Entered under driver's name	Citroën C3 Rally2	(France) Yoann Bonato	(France) Benjamin Boulloud	M	1	
Entered under driver's name	Toyota GR Yaris Rally2	(Norway) Eyvind Brynildsen	(Norway) Jørn Listerud	P	3	
Entered under driver's name	Škoda Fabia RS Rally2	(Italy) Simone Campedelli	(Italy) Tania Canton	M	5	
Entered under driver's name	Škoda Fabia RS Rally2	(Italy) Vittorio Ceccato	(Italy) Paolo Garavaldi	P	5	Master ERC
Entered under driver's name	Škoda Fabia RS Rally2	(Romania) Bogdan Cuzma	(Romania) Marc Banca	M	2	
Entered under driver's name	Škoda Fabia RS Rally2	(Italy) Roberto Daprà	(Italy) Luca Guglielmetti	P	5	
Entered under driver's name	Škoda Fabia RS Rally2	(Bulgaria) Nikolay Gryazin	(Bulgaria) Konstantin Aleksandrov	M	8 (Note: Appeared on the entry list for Croatia Rally, but withdrew before the start.)	
Entered under driver's name	Škoda Fabia RS Rally2	(Poland) Grzegorz Grzyb	(Poland) Adam Binięda	P	4	
Entered under driver's name	Škoda Fabia Rally2 evo	(Sweden) Mille Johansson	(Sweden) Johan Grönvall	H	1, 5	
Entered under driver's name	Škoda Fabia RS Rally2	(Sweden) Mille Johansson	(Sweden) Johan Grönvall	H	3–4	
Entered under driver's name	Škoda Fabia RS Rally2	(Sweden) Mille Johansson	(Sweden) Johan Grönvall	P	6, 8	
Entered under driver's name	Škoda Fabia R5	(Finland) Tommi Jylhä	(Finland) Mika Nevanpää	P	3	
Entered under driver's name	Škoda Fabia RS Rally2	(Slovakia) Ján Kundlák	(Slovakia) Peter Baran	H	6	
Entered under driver's name	Citroën C3 Rally2	(Spain) Efrén Llarena	(Spain) Sara Fernández	M	1	
Entered under driver's name	Toyota GR Yaris Rally2	(Spain) Efrén Llarena	(Spain) Sara Fernández	M	5	
Entered under driver's name	Škoda Fabia RS Rally2	(Italy) Andrea Mabellini	(Italy) Virginia Lenzi	P	All	
Entered under driver's name	Citroën C3 Rally2	(Romania) Norbert Maior	(Romania) Francesca Maria Maior	H	2, 8	
Entered under driver's name	Škoda Fabia RS Rally2	(Poland) Mikołaj Marczyk	(Poland) Szymon Gospodarczyk	M	All	
Entered under driver's name	Škoda Fabia RS Rally2	(Poland) Jakub Matulka	(Poland) Damian Syty	M	All	
Entered under driver's name	Škoda Fabia Rally2 evo	(Poland) Wojciech Musiał	(Poland) Konrad Dudziński	P	4	
Entered under driver's name	Škoda Fabia RS Rally2	(Italy) Davide Porta	(Italy) Andrea Quistini	P	5	
Entered under driver's name	Citroën C3 Rally2	(Belgium) Maxime Potty	(Belgium) Renaud Herman	—N/a	1 (Note: Appeared on the entry list for Rally Sierra Morena, but withdrew before the start.)	
Entered under driver's name	Škoda Fabia RS Rally2	(Sweden) Isak Reiersen	(Sweden) Stefan Gustavsson	H	2–4	
Entered under driver's name	Ford Fiesta Rally2	(United Kingdom) Neil Roskell	(United Kingdom) Daniel Barritt	M	7	Master ERC
Entered under driver's name	Škoda Fabia RS Rally2	(Italy) Antonio Rusce	(Italy) Gabriele Zanni	P	5	Master ERC
Entered under driver's name	Toyota GR Yaris Rally2	(Italy) Marco Signor	(Italy) Daniele Michi	M	5	
Entered under driver's name	Citroën C3 Rally2	(Italy) Rachele Somaschini	(Italy) Giulia Zanchetta	P	5	
Entered under driver's name	Škoda Fabia RS Rally2	(Netherlands) Jos Verstappen	(Belgium) Renaud Jamoul	P	1–5	Master ERC
Entered under driver's name	Škoda Fabia RS Rally2	(Estonia) Robert Virves	(Estonia) Jakko Viilo	H	1, 8	

=== ERC3 ===
Rally3 entries
Car	Entrant	Driver	Co-Driver	Tyres	Rounds	Trophy
(Slovakia) Chooligan Racing Team	Ford Fiesta Rally3	(Slovakia) Robert Kolčák	(Slovakia) Emil Horniaček	M	6	FRally3T
(Estonia) CRC Rally Team	Ford Fiesta Rally3	(Estonia) Esmar-Arnold Unt	(Romania) Denisa-Alexia Parteni	P	2, 4	FRally3T
(Poland) Grupa PGS RT	Ford Fiesta Rally3	(Poland) Hubert Laskowski	(Poland) Daniel Dymurski	P	5	FRally3T
(Poland) Grupa PGS RT	Ford Fiesta Rally3	(Poland) Igor Widłak	(Poland) Daniel Dymurski	P	1–3	FRally3T
(Poland) Grupa PGS RT	Ford Fiesta Rally3	(Poland) Igor Widłak	(Poland) Michał Marczewski	P	4	FRally3T
(Slovenia) IK Sport Racing	Ford Fiesta Rally3	(Croatia) Martin Ravenščak	(Croatia) Dora Ravenščak	P	1–3, 5–6, 8	FRally3T
(Finland) KMS Racing x VL	Ford Fiesta Rally3	(Australia) Taylor Gill	(Australia) Daniel Brkic	P	5	FRally3T
(Finland) KMS Racing x VL	Ford Fiesta Rally3	(Australia) Taylor Gill	(Australia) Daniel Brkic	H	8	
(Republic of Ireland) Motorsport Ireland Rally Academy	Ford Fiesta Rally3	(Republic of Ireland) Eamonn Kelly	(Republic of Ireland) Lorcan Moore	H	7	
(Hungary) OLP Motorsport Kft.	Ford Fiesta Rally3	(Hungary) Márton Bertalan	(Hungary) Róbert Paizs	P	2	FRally3T
(Japan) Toyota Gazoo Racing WRT NG	Renault Clio Rally3	(Japan) Shotaro Goto	(Finland) Jussi Lindberg	P	8	
(Japan) Toyota Gazoo Racing WRT NG	Renault Clio Rally3	(Japan) Takumi Matsushita	(Finland) Pekka Kelander	P	8	
Private Rally3 entries
Entered under driver's name	Ford Fiesta Rally3	(Poland) Tymoteusz Abramowski	(Poland) Jakub Wróbel	P	1, 3–8	FRally3T
Entered under driver's name	Ford Fiesta Rally3	(Poland) Tymoteusz Abramowski	(Poland) Grzegorz Dachowski	P	2	FRally3T
Entered under driver's name	Ford Fiesta Rally3	(Poland) Tadeusz Bieńko	(Poland) Szymon Marciniak	P	4	FRally3T
Entered under driver's name	Renault Clio Rally3	(Poland) Sebastian Butyński	(Poland) Łukasz Jastrzębski	P	1–2, 5–6, 8	
Entered under driver's name	Ford Fiesta Rally3	(France) Tristan Charpentier	(France) Florian Barral	P	1–5	FRally3T
Entered under driver's name	Ford Fiesta Rally3	(Republic of Ireland) Casey Jay Coleman	(Republic of Ireland) Killian McArdle	P	1–2, 4–5	FRally3T
Entered under driver's name	Ford Fiesta Rally3	(Republic of Ireland) Casey Jay Coleman	(Republic of Ireland) Lorcan Moore	P	6	FRally3T
Entered under driver's name	Renault Clio Rally3	(Poland) Błażej Gazda	(Poland) Michał Jurgała	P	1–6, 8	
Entered under driver's name	Ford Fiesta Rally3	(Sweden) Adam Grahn	(Sweden) Maja Bengtsson	P	1	FRally3T
Entered under driver's name	Ford Fiesta Rally3	(Sweden) Adam Grahn	(Sweden) Christoffer Bäck	P	2, 4–5	FRally3T
Entered under driver's name	Renault Clio Rally3	(Poland) Hubert Kowalczyk	(Poland) Jarosław Hryniuk	P	All	
Entered under driver's name	Ford Fiesta Rally3	(Poland) Adrian Łabuda	(Poland) Michał Kuśnierz	P	4	FRally3T
Entered under driver's name	Ford Fiesta Rally3	(Croatia) Jan Pokos	(Slovenia) Viljem Ošlaj	H	8	
Entered under driver's name	Ford Fiesta Rally3	(Czech Republic) Daniel Polášek	(Czech Republic) Zdeněk Omelka	P	6	FRally3T
Entered under driver's name	Ford Fiesta Rally3	(Poland) Adrian Rzeźnik	(Poland) Kamil Kozdroń	P	1–6, 8	FRally3T
Entered under driver's name	Ford Fiesta Rally3	(Poland) Adam Sroka	(Poland) Patryk Kielar	P	4	FRally3T
Entered under driver's name	Renault Clio Rally3	(Bulgaria) Aleksandar Tomov	(Bulgaria) Dimitar Spasov	P	1	
Entered under driver's name	Renault Clio Rally3	(Finland) Ville Vatanen	(Finland) Jarno Ottman	M	2–4	

=== ERC4 ===
Rally4 and Rally5 entries
Car	Entrant	Driver	Co-Driver	Tyres	Rounds	Category
(Germany) ADAC Opel Rallye Junior Team	Opel Corsa Rally4	(Sweden) Calle Carlberg	(Norway) Jørgen Eriksen	H	1–2, 4–5, 8	ERC4J
(Germany) ADAC Opel Rallye Junior Team	Opel Corsa Rally4	(Sweden) Calle Carlberg	(Sweden) Torbjörn Carlberg	H	6	ERC4J
(Germany) ADAC Opel Rallye Junior Team	Opel Corsa Rally4	(Austria) Luca Pröglhöf	(Austria) Christina Ettel	H	1–2, 4–6, 8 (Note: Appeared on the entry list for Rally Poland, but withdrew before the start.)	ERC4J
(Croatia) AK Zagorje	Peugeot 208 Rally4	(Croatia) Dario Merlić	(Croatia) Danijel Radovanić	M	8	
(Belgium) AMC Sankt Vith	Opel Corsa Rally4	(Belgium) Tom Heindrichs	(Luxembourg) Jonas Schmitz	M	5	
(Hungary) HRT Racing Kft.	Peugeot 208 Rally4	(Republic of Ireland) Aoife Raftery	(Republic of Ireland) Hannah McKillop	H	1–2, 4–6	ERC4J
(Hungary) HRT Racing Kft.	Peugeot 208 Rally4	(Romania) Mihnea Hanea	(Romania) Natalie Hanea	H	2	ERC4J
(Slovenia) IK Sport Racing	Opel Corsa Rally4	(Finland) Leevi Lassila	(Finland) Antti Linnaketo	H	1–2, 4–6, 8	ERC4J
(Slovenia) IK Sport Racing	Opel Corsa Rally4	(Norway) Karl Peder Nordstrand	(Norway) Jørn Listerud	H	6	ERC4J
(Slovenia) IK Sport Racing	Opel Corsa Rally4	(Norway) Karl Peder Nordstrand	(Norway) Sunniva Rudi	H	8	ERC4J
(Republic of Ireland) Motorsport Ireland Rally Academy	Peugeot 208 Rally4	(Republic of Ireland) Keelan Grogan	(Republic of Ireland) Ayrton Sherlock	H	1–2, 4–6, 8	ERC4J
(Republic of Ireland) Motorsport Ireland Rally Academy	Peugeot 208 Rally4	(Republic of Ireland) Craig Rahill	(Republic of Ireland) Conor Smith	H	1–2, 4–5	ERC4J
(Republic of Ireland) Motorsport Ireland Rally Academy	Lancia Ypsilon Rally4 HF	(Republic of Ireland) Craig Rahill	(Republic of Ireland) Conor Smith	H	6, 8	ERC4J
(Italy) Motorsport Italia	Renault Clio Rally4	(Italy) Michael Rendina	(Italy) Alice Caprile	P	5	
(Spain) RACC Motorsport	Peugeot 208 Rally4	(Spain) Sergi Pérez Jr.	(Spain) Axel Coronado	H	1–2, 4–5	ERC4J
(Spain) RACC Motorsport	Peugeot 208 Rally4	(Spain) Jordi San Andrés	(Spain) Alberto Gil	P	1	
Team Estonia Autosport	Ford Fiesta Rally4	(Estonia) Kevin Lempu	(Estonia) Fredi Kostikov	H	2, 5	ERC4J
Team Estonia Autosport	Ford Fiesta Rally4	(Estonia) Mark-Egert Tiits	(Estonia) Rainis Raidma	H	1–2, 4	ERC4J
Team Estonia Autosport	Peugeot 208 Rally4	(Estonia) Jaspar Vaher	(Estonia) Sander Pruul	H	1	ERC4J
Team Estonia Autosport	Lancia Ypsilon Rally4 HF	(Estonia) Jaspar Vaher	(Estonia) Sander Pruul	H	2, 4–6	ERC4J
(Austria) Waldherr Motorsport Team	Opel Corsa Rally4	(Austria) Maximilian Lichtenegger	(Austria) Gerald Winter	H	6	ERC4J
Private Rally4 and Rally5 entries
Entered under driver's name	Renault Clio Rally4	(Sweden) Simon Andersson	(Sweden) Jörgen Jönsson	H	1, 4	ERC4J
Entered under driver's name	Lancia Ypsilon Rally4 HF	(Italy) Nicolò Ardizzone	(San Marino) Valentina Pasini	M	5	
Entered under driver's name	Lancia Ypsilon Rally4 HF	(Italy) Giorgio Cogni	(San Marino) Daiana Darderi	M	5	
Entered under driver's name	Ford Fiesta Rally4	(Republic of Ireland) Brendan Cumiskey	(Republic of Ireland) Arthur Kierans	—N/a	4	
Entered under driver's name	Lancia Ypsilon Rally4 HF	(Italy) Edoardo De Antoni	(Italy) Martina Musiari	M	5	
Entered under driver's name	Opel Corsa Rally4	(Belgium) Maxim Decock	(Belgium) Tom Buyse	H	1–2, 4	ERC4J
Entered under driver's name	Peugeot 208 Rally4	(Italy) Francesco Dei Ceci	(Italy) Nicolò Lazzarini	H	1–2, 4–6	ERC4J
Entered under driver's name	Lancia Ypsilon Rally4 HF	(Italy) Francesco Dei Ceci	(Italy) Nicolò Lazzarini	H	8	ERC4J
Entered under driver's name	Lancia Ypsilon Rally4 HF	(Italy) Gabriel Di Pietro	(Italy) Andrea Dresti	M	5	
Entered under driver's name	Peugeot 208 Rally4	(Italy) Matteo Doretto	(Italy) Andrea Budoia	H	1–2	ERC4J
Entered under driver's name	Peugeot 208 Rally4	(Italy) Matteo Doretto	(Italy) Samuele Pellegrino	H	4	ERC4J
Entered under driver's name	Lancia Ypsilon Rally4 HF	(Italy) Emmanuele Fiore	(Italy) Pietro D'Agostino	M	5	Master ERC
Entered under driver's name	Lancia Ypsilon Rally4 HF	(Italy) Federico Francia	(Italy) Chiara Lombardi	M	5	
Entered under driver's name	Peugeot 208 Rally4	(Sweden) Patrik Hallberg	(Sweden) John Stigh	P	5	
Entered under driver's name	Peugeot 208 Rally4	(Sweden) Victor Hansen	(Denmark) Ditte Kammersgaard	H	1–2, 4	ERC4J
Entered under driver's name	Peugeot 208 Rally4	(Sweden) Victor Hansen	(Denmark) Ditte Kammersgaard	M	3	
Entered under driver's name	Peugeot 208 Rally4	(Finland) Tuukka Kauppinen	(Finland) Topi Luhtinen	H	1	ERC4J
Entered under driver's name	Lancia Ypsilon Rally4 HF	(Finland) Tuukka Kauppinen	(Finland) Veli-Pekka Karttunen	H	2, 4–5	ERC4J
Entered under driver's name	Lancia Ypsilon Rally4 HF	(Finland) Tuukka Kauppinen	(Finland) Samu Vaaleri	H	8	ERC4J
Entered under driver's name	Peugeot 208 Rally4	(Germany) Tom Kässer	(Germany) Stephan Schneeweiß	H	1	
Entered under driver's name	Peugeot 208 Rally4	(Germany) Tom Kässer	(Germany) Stephan Schneeweiß	P	2	
Entered under driver's name	Peugeot 208 Rally4	(Germany) Norman Kreuter	(Denmark) Jeannette Kvick	P	2, 8	Master ERC
Entered under driver's name	Peugeot 208 Rally4	(Poland) Hubert Laskowski	(Spain) Esther Gutiérrez	H	1	ERC4J
Entered under driver's name	Lancia Ypsilon Rally4 HF	(Austria) Michael Lengauer	(Austria) Jürgen Rausch	M	5	
Entered under driver's name	Peugeot 208 Rally4	(United Kingdom) Ioan Lloyd	(United Kingdom) Sion Williams	H	1–2, 4–8	ERC4J
Entered under driver's name	Renault Clio Rally5	(Romania) Artur Luca	(Romania) Mihai Supuran	H	2	ERC4J
Entered under driver's name	Renault Clio Rally5	(Romania) Artur Luca	(Romania) Vlad Colceriu	H	4	ERC4J
Entered under driver's name	Renault Clio Rally5	(Romania) Ciprian Lupu	(Romania) Vlad Colceriu	P	1, 5	
Entered under driver's name	Lancia Ypsilon Rally4 HF	(Italy) Andrea Mazzocchi	(Italy) Nicolò Gonella	M	5	
Entered under driver's name	Lancia Ypsilon Rally4 HF	(Italy) Davide Pesavento	(Italy) Alessandro Michelet	M	5	
Entered under driver's name	Lancia Ypsilon Rally4 HF	(Italy) Gianandrea Pisani	(Italy) Nicola Biagi	M	5	
Entered under driver's name	Lancia Ypsilon Rally4 HF	(Italy) Giuseppe Piumatti	(Italy) Sonia Piumatti	M	5	Master ERC
Entered under driver's name	Lancia Ypsilon Rally4 HF	(Poland) Dariusz Poloński	(Poland) Łukasz Sitek	M	5	
Entered under driver's name	Lancia Ypsilon Rally4 HF	(Italy) Mauro Porzia	(Italy) Arianna Genaro	M	5	
Entered under driver's name	Renault Clio Rally4	(Romania) Catherine Rădulescu	(Romania) Bogdan Minea	P	1, 5, 8	
Entered under driver's name	Lancia Ypsilon Rally4 HF	(Italy) Emmanuele Rosso	(Italy) Federico Capilli	M	5	
Entered under driver's name	Peugeot 208 Rally4	(Italy) Tommaso Sandrin	(Italy) Andrea Dal Maso	H	1–2, 4–6	ERC4J
Entered under driver's name	Renault Clio Rally4	(Portugal) Kevin Saraiva	(Portugal) Beatriz Pinto	H	1, 5	ERC4J
Entered under driver's name	Opel Corsa Rally4	(Germany) Timo Schulz	(Germany) Michael Wenzel	H	1–2 (Note: Appeared on the entry list for Rally Hungary, but withdrew before the start.)	ERC4J
Entered under driver's name	Lancia Ypsilon Rally4 HF	(Poland) Adam Sroka	(Poland) Paweł Pochroń	M	5	
Entered under driver's name	Opel Corsa Rally4	(Romania) Cristian Sugár	(Romania) Vlad Colceriu	H	2	ERC4J
Entered under driver's name	Peugeot 208 Rally4	(Switzerland) Yohan Surroca	(France) Pierre Blot	H	5	ERC4J
Entered under driver's name	Lancia Ypsilon Rally4 HF	(Italy) Denis Vigliaturo	(Italy) Ermanno Corradini	M	5	

== Results ==
=== Season summary ===
Round	Event	Winning driver	Winning co-driver	Winning entrant	Winning time	Report	Ref.
1	(Spain) Rally Sierra Morena	(Bulgaria) Nikolay Gryazin	(Bulgaria) Konstantin Aleksandrov	(Poland) J2X Rally Team	2:01:49.5	Report	
2	Rally Hungary	(Finland) Roope Korhonen	(Finland) Anssi Viinikka	(India) Team MRF Tyres	1:50:30.7	Report	
3	(Sweden) Royal Rally of Scandinavia	(Norway) Eyvind Brynildsen	(Norway) Jørn Listerud	(Norway) Eyvind Brynildsen	1:33:40.8	Report	
4	Rally Poland	(Latvia) Mārtiņš Sesks	(Latvia) Renārs Francis	(India) Team MRF Tyres	1:37:56.4	Report	
5	(Italy) Rally di Roma Capitale	(Italy) Giandomenico Basso	(Italy) Lorenzo Granai	(Italy) Giandomenico Basso	2:04:11.2	Report	
6	(Czech Republic) Barum Czech Rally Zlín	(Czech Republic) Jan Kopecký	(Czech Republic) Jiří Hovorka	(Czech Republic) Agrotec Škoda Rally Team	2:00:49.3	Report	
7	(United Kingdom) Rali Ceredigion	(Republic of Ireland) Jon Armstrong	(Republic of Ireland) Shane Byrne	(United Kingdom) M-Sport Ford World Rally Team	1:34:52.0	Report	
8	Croatia Rally	(Republic of Ireland) Jon Armstrong	(Republic of Ireland) Shane Byrne	(United Kingdom) M-Sport Ford World Rally Team	1:50:57.4	Report	

=== Scoring system ===
Points for final position are awarded as in the following table in ERC, ERC3 and ERC4. In ERC, ERC3 and ERC4, the best seven scores from the eight rounds count towards the final number of points. In the Junior ERC category, the best five rounds out of six count.

Position	1st	2nd	3rd	4th	5th	6th	7th	8th	9th	10th	11th	12th	13th	14th	15th
Points	30	24	21	19	17	15	13	11	9	7	5	4	3	2	1

There are also five bonus points awarded to the winners of the Power Stage, four points for second place, three for third, two for fourth and one for fifth. Power Stage points are awarded only in the main ERC drivers' and co-drivers' championships.

Position	1st	2nd	3rd	4th	5th
Points	5	4	3	2	1

Teams may register a maximum of three cars under a team name to score points in the teams' championship, of which the best two will score points. Cars driven by ERC4 priority drivers score points in their own group.

=== Drivers' championships ===
==== ERC ====
Pos	Driver	ESP (Spain)	HUN (Hungary)	SWE (Sweden)	POL (Poland)	ITA (Italy)	CZE (Czech Republic)	GBR (United Kingdom)	CRO (Croatia)	Points	Best 7
1	(Poland) Mikołaj Marczyk	5^{3}	3^{3}	7	2	3^{1}	7^{4}	3^{3}	3	167	154
2	(Republic of Ireland) Jon Armstrong	Ret	10^{2}	10^{3}	3^{2}	11^{3}	2^{3}	1^{4}	1^{1}	148	148
3	(Italy) Andrea Mabellini	4^{1}	Ret	4^{2}	8^{4}	2^{5}	3^{1}	6^{1}	Ret	131	131
4	(Norway) Mads Østberg	8	2^{4}	8	5	8	WD		2^{2}	104	104
5	(Finland) Roope Korhonen		1^{5}	2^{1}	Ret	Ret				60	60
6	(Sweden) Isak Reiersen		4	3	4^{5}					60	60
7	(Estonia) Romet Jürgenson							2^{2}	4^{3}	50	50
8	(Sweden) Mille Johansson	7		6	7	15	10		Ret	49	49
9	(Romania) Simone Tempestini	Ret	Ret	9	6^{3}	Ret	Ret		10^{4}	36	36
10	(Latvia) Mārtiņš Sesks				1^{1}					35	35
11	(Bulgaria) Nikolay Gryazin	1^{2}							WD	34	34
12	(Norway) Eyvind Brynildsen			1^{5}						31	31
13	(Czech Republic) Jan Kopecký						1^{5}			31	31
14	(Italy) Giandomenico Basso					1				30	30
15	(Austria) Simon Wagner	10				Ret	4^{2}		Ret	30	30
16	(Czech Republic) Erik Cais						5		7	30	30
17	(Poland) Jakub Matulka	11	Ret	12	9	Ret	9	Ret	Ret	27	27
18	(France) Yoann Bonato	2^{4}								26	26
19	(Romania) Norbert Maior		6						8	26	26
20	(Italy) Roberto Daprà					4^{2}				23	23
21	(Spain) José Antonio Suárez	3^{5}								22	22
22	(Hungary) Norbert Herczig	Ret	9			12			9	22	22
23	(Republic of Ireland) William Creighton							4		19	19
24	(Norway) Frank Tore Larsen			5^{4}						19	19
25	(Italy) Andrea Crugnola					5^{4}				19	19
26	(Estonia) Robert Virves	Ret							5^{5}	18	18
27	(Hungary) Gábor Német		5							17	17
28	(United Kingdom) Osian Pryce							5		17	17
29	(Spain) Pepe López	6								15	15
30	(Italy) Simone Campedelli					6				15	15
31	(Czech Republic) Filip Mareš						6			15	15
32	(Finland) Lauri Joona								6	15	15
33	(Netherlands) Jos Verstappen	13	8	Ret	Ret	WD				14	14
34	(France) Stéphane Lefebvre	9		11	Ret		WD			14	14
35	(Hungary) Sasa Ollé		7	21	Ret					13	13
36	(Spain) Efrén Llarena	Ret				7				13	13
37	(United Kingdom) Callum Black							7		13	13
38	(Czech Republic) Adam Březík						8			11	11
39	(Republic of Ireland) Eamonn Kelly							8		11	11
40	(Czech Republic) Martin Vlček	20	14	19	Ret	57	12	11	Ret	11	11
41	(United Kingdom) Ioan Lloyd	24	26		26	26	Ret	9	Ret	9	9
42	(Italy) Boštjan Avbelj					9				9	9
43	(United Kingdom) Meirion Evans							10^{5}		8	8
44	(Spain) Roberto Blach Jr.	12			14	14			Ret	8	8
45	(Czech Republic) Dominik Stříteský	Ret	Ret			10	Ret			7	7
46	(Poland) Krzysztof Bubik				10					7	7
47	(Poland) Hubert Kowalczyk	36	15	Ret	22	28	13	13	21	7	7
48	(United Kingdom) Max McRae		Ret	24	11	Ret	WD	16		5	5
49	(Hungary) Antal Kovács		11						Ret	5	5
50	(Czech Republic) Václav Pech Jr.						11			5	5
51	(Japan) Yuki Yamamoto								11	5	5
52	(Poland) Tymoteusz Abramowski	26	36	13	15	21	32	15	19	5	5
53	(United Kingdom) Philip Allen	Ret	32^{1}	Ret	Ret	Ret	Ret	Ret		5	5
54	(Poland) Igor Widłak	34	12	20	28					4	4
55	(Republic of Ireland) Eamonn Boland					31		12		4	4
56	(Poland) Jakub Brzeziński				12					4	4
57	(France) Pablo Sarrazin								12	4	4
58	(Hungary) Márton Bertalan		13							3	3
59	(Poland) Łukasz Byśkiniewicz				13					3	3
60	(Italy) Marco Signor					13				3	3
61	(Slovenia) Rok Turk								13	3	3
62	(Finland) Ville Vatanen		16	14	17					2	2
63	(Poland) Dariusz Biedrzyński	37	25	23	35	37	14			2	2
64	(Australia) Taylor Gill					62			14	2	2
65	(Spain) Unai de La Dehesa	14								2	2
66	(United Kingdom) Garry Pearson							14		2	2
67	(Hungary) András Hadik	15	Ret		20	50			16	1	1
68	(Sweden) Calle Carlberg	17	18		23	22	31		15	1	1
69	(France) Tristan Charpentier	22	27	15	18	Ret				1	1
70	(Republic of Ireland) Casey Jay Coleman	39	Ret		24	33	15			1	1

Key
Colour	Result
Gold	Winner
Silver	2nd place
Bronze	3rd place
Green	Points finish
Blue	Non-points finish
Blue	Non-classified finish (NC)
Purple	Did not finish (Ret)
Black	Excluded (EX)
Black	Disqualified (DSQ)
White	Did not start (DNS)
White	Cancelled (C)
Blank	Withdrew entry from the event (WD)

Notes:
^{1 2 3 4 5} – Power Stage position

==== ERC3 ====
Pos	Driver	ESP (Spain)	HUN (Hungary)	SWE (Sweden)	POL (Poland)	ITA (Italy)	CZE (Czech Republic)	GBR (United Kingdom)	CRO (Croatia)	Points	Best 7
1	(Poland) Tymoteusz Abramowski	3	8	1	1	1	7	3	2	180	169
2	(Poland) Hubert Kowalczyk	6	3	Ret	5	2	1	2	3	152	152
3	(Poland) Błażej Gazda	9	5	6	7	5	5		4	107	107
4	(France) Tristan Charpentier	1	6	3	3	Ret				87	87
5	(Poland) Igor Widłak	5	1	5	8					75	75
6	(Republic of Ireland) Casey Jay Coleman	8	Ret		6	3	2			71	71
7	(Poland) Adrian Rzeźnik	2	9	4	Ret	Ret	Ret		5	69	69
8	(Croatia) Martin Ravenščak	4	Ret	Ret		6	4		6	68	68
9	(Finland) Ville Vatanen		4	2	2					67	67
10	(Australia) Taylor Gill					8			1	41	41
11	(Poland) Sebastian Butyński	7	Ret			Ret	6		7	41	41
12	(Republic of Ireland) Eamonn Kelly							1		30	30
13	(Sweden) Adam Grahn	WD	Ret		10	4				26	26
14	(Hungary) Márton Bertalan		2							24	24
15	(Czech Republic) Daniel Polášek						3			21	21
16	(Poland) Adrian Łabuda					4				19	19
17	(Estonia) Esmar-Arnold Unt		7		11					18	18
18	(Poland) Hubert Laskowski					7				13	13
19	(Croatia) Jan Pokos								8	11	11
20	(Poland) Tadeusz Bieńko				9					9	9
21	(Japan) Takumi Matsushita								9	9	9

==== ERC4 ====
Pos	Driver	ESP (Spain)	HUN (Hungary)	SWE (Sweden)	POL (Poland)	ITA (Italy)	CZE (Czech Republic)	GBR (United Kingdom)	CRO (Croatia)	Points	Best 7
1	(Sweden) Calle Carlberg	2	1		1	1	8		1	155	155
2	(United Kingdom) Ioan Lloyd	5	5		2	5	Ret	1	Ret	105	105
3	(Sweden) Victor Hansen	10	2	1	7					74	74
4	(Republic of Ireland) Craig Rahill	4	Ret		Ret	4	1		Ret	68	68
5	(Estonia) Jaspar Vaher	3	4		Ret	3	Ret			61	61
6	(Austria) Luca Pröglhöf	8	12			Ret	5		3	53	53
7	(Spain) Sergi Pérez Jr.	1	10		6	Ret				52	52
8	(Norway) Karl Peder Nordstrand						2		2	48	48
9	(Finland) Tuukka Kauppinen	20	13		3	11			4	48	48
10	(Italy) Francesco Dei Ceci	Ret	Ret		9	7	4		Ret	41	41
11	(Republic of Ireland) Keelan Grogan	13	11		8	14	6		Ret	36	36
12	(Italy) Matteo Doretto	7	3		WD					34	34
13	(Republic of Ireland) Aoife Raftery	15	8		4	20				31	31
14	(Italy) Tommaso Sandrin	6	Ret		Ret		7			28	28
15	(Germany) Norman Kreuter		7						7	26	26
16	(Italy) Gianandrea Pisani					2				24	24
17	(Austria) Maximilian Lichtenegger						3			21	21
18	(Estonia) Mark-Egert Tiits	14	Ret		5					19	19
19	(Finland) Leevi Lassila	Ret	6		12	17	Ret		Ret	19	19
20	(Croatia) Dario Merlić								5	17	17
21	(Romania) Catherine Rădulescu	18				Ret			6	15	15
22	(Switzerland) Yohan Surroca					6				15	15
23	(Sweden) Simon Andersson	11			10					12	12
24	(Italy) Andrea Mazzocchi					11				11	11
25	(Estonia) Kevin Lempu		9			Ret				9	9
26	(Poland) Hubert Laskowski	9								9	9
27	(Italy) Giorgio Cogni					9				9	9
28	(Italy) Edoardo De Antoni					10				7	7
29	(Romania) Artur Luca		14		11					7	7
30	(Belgium) Maxim Decock	12	Ret		Ret					4	4
31	(Austria) Michael Lengauer					12				4	4
32	(Italy) Nicolò Ardizzone					13				3	3
33	(Poland) Dariusz Poloński					15				1	1

==== Junior ERC ====
Pos	Driver	ESP (Spain)	HUN (Hungary)	POL (Poland)	ITA (Italy)	CZE (Czech Republic)	CRO (Croatia)	Points	Best 5
1	(Sweden) Calle Carlberg	2	1	1	1	8	1	155	144
2	(United Kingdom) Ioan Lloyd	5	5	2	4	Ret	Ret	77	77
3	(Republic of Ireland) Craig Rahill	4	Ret	Ret	3	1	Ret	70	70
4	(Estonia) Jaspar Vaher	3	4	Ret	2	Ret		64	64
5	(Finland) Tuukka Kauppinen	17	12	3	7		4	57	57
6	(Spain) Sergi Pérez Jr.	1	9	6	Ret			54	54
7	(Austria) Luca Pröglhöf	8	11		Ret	5	3	54	54
8	(Norway) Karl Peder Nordstrand					2	2	48	48
9	(Republic of Ireland) Keelan Grogan	13	10	8	8	6	Ret	47	47
10	(Sweden) Victor Hansen	10	2	7				44	44
11	(Italy) Francesco Dei Ceci	Ret	Ret	9	6	4	Ret	43	43
12	(Republic of Ireland) Aoife Raftery	15	7	4	10			40	40
13	(Italy) Matteo Doretto	7	3	WD				34	34
14	(Italy) Tommaso Sandrin	6	Ret	Ret		7		28	28
15	(Finland) Leevi Lassila	Ret	6	12	9	Ret	Ret	28	28
16	(Austria) Maximilian Lichtenegger					3		21	21
17	(Estonia) Mark-Egert Tiits	14	Ret	5				19	19
18	(Switzerland) Yohan Surroca				5			17	17
19	(Sweden) Simon Andersson	11		10				12	12
20	(Estonia) Kevin Lempu		8		Ret			11	11
21	(Poland) Hubert Laskowski	9						11	11
22	(Romania) Artur Luca		13	11				8	8
23	(Portugal) Kevin Saraiva	Ret			11			5	5
24	(Belgium) Maxim Decock	12	Ret	Ret				4	4

=== Co-Drivers' championships ===
==== ERC ====
Pos	Co-Driver	ESP (Spain)	HUN (Hungary)	SWE (Sweden)	POL (Poland)	ITA (Italy)	CZE (Czech Republic)	GBR (United Kingdom)	CRO (Croatia)	Points	Best 7
1	(Poland) Szymon Gospodarczyk	5^{3}	3^{3}	7	2	3^{1}	7^{4}	3^{3}		146	146
2	(Italy) Virginia Lenzi	4^{1}	Ret	4^{2}	8^{4}	2^{5}	3^{1}	6^{1}		131	131
3	(Republic of Ireland) Shane Byrne	Ret	10^{2}	10^{3}	3^{2}	11^{3}	2^{3}	1^{4}		113	113
4	(Finland) Anssi Viinikka		1^{5}	2^{1}	Ret	Ret				60	60
5	(Sweden) Stefan Gustavsson		4	3	4^{5}					60	60
6	(Sweden) Johan Grönvall	7		6	7	15	10			49	49
7	(Norway) Torstein Eriksen	8	2^{4}			8				48	48
8	(Latvia) Renārs Francis				1^{1}					35	35
9	(Bulgaria) Konstantin Aleksandrov	1^{2}								34	34
10	(Norway) Jørn Listerud			1^{5}			19			31	31
11	(Czech Republic) Jiří Hovorka						1^{5}			31	31
12	(Italy) Lorenzo Granai					1				30	30
13	(Germany) Hanna Ostlender	10				Ret	4^{2}			30	30
14	(Estonia) Siim Oja							2^{2}		28	28
15	(Romania) Sergiu Itu	Ret	Ret	9	6^{3}	Ret	Ret			27	27
16	(Poland) Damian Syty	11	Ret	12	9	Ret	9	Ret		27	27
17	(France) Benjamin Boulloud	2^{4}								26	26
18	(Italy) Luca Guglielmetti					4^{2}				23	23
19	(Spain) Alberto Iglesias	3^{5}								22	22
20	(Republic of Ireland) Liam Regan							4		19	19
21	(Norway) Lars-Håkon Lundgreen			5^{4}						19	19
22	(Italy) Pietro Elia Ometto					5^{4}				19	19
23	(Czech Republic) Ondřej Krajča					10	8			18	18
24	(Hungary) Gergely Németh		5							17	17
25	(Italy) Giovanni Bernacchini					5				17	17
26	(Czech Republic) Daniel Trunkát						5			17	17
27	(Republic of Ireland) Andy Hayes							5		19	19
28	(Spain) David Vázquez	6								15	15
29	(Romania) Francesca Maria Maior		6							15	15
30	(Italy) Tania Canton					6				15	15
31	(Czech Republic) Radovan Bucha						6			15	15
32	(Belgium) Renaud Jamoul	13	8	Ret	Ret	WD				14	14
33	(France) Andy Malfoy	9		11	Ret		WD			14	14
34	(Hungary) Rebeka Ollé		7	21	Ret					13	13
35	(Spain) Sara Fernández	Ret				7				13	13
36	(United Kingdom) Jack Morton							7		13	13
37	(Hungary) Ramón Ferencz	Ret	9			12				13	13
38	(Republic of Ireland) Lorcan Moore						15	8		12	12
39	(Sweden) Lucas Karlsson			8			WD			11	11
40	(United Kingdom) Sion Williams	24	26		26	26	Ret	9		9	9
41	(Italy) Elia De Guio					9				9	9
42	(United Kingdom) Dale Furniss							10^{5}		9	9
43	(Spain) Mauro Barreiro	12			14	14				8	8
44	(Poland) Adrian Sadowski				10					7	7
45	(Poland) Jarosław Hryniuk	36	15	Ret	22	28	13	13		7	7
46	(Czech Republic) Jakub Kunst	20	14	19	Ret	57	12			6	6
47	(United Kingdom) Cameron Fair		Ret	24	11	Ret	WD	16		5	5
48	(Hungary) Richárd Csáki		11				26			5	5
49	(Czech Republic) Petr Uhel						11			5	5
50	(Czech Republic) Karolína Zubíčková							11		5	5
51	(Poland) Jakub Wróbel	26		13	15	21	32	15		5	5
52	(United Kingdom) Craig Drew	Ret	32^{1}	Ret	Ret	Ret	Ret	Ret		5	5
53	(Poland) Daniel Dymurski	34	12	20	28	59				4	4
54	(Republic of Ireland) Michael Joseph Morrissey					31		12		4	4
55	(Poland) Jakub Gerber				12					4	4
56	(Hungary) Róbert Paizs		13							3	3
57	(Poland) Daniel Siatkowski				13					3	3
58	(Italy) Daniele Michi					13				3	3
59	(Finland) Jarno Ottman		16	14	17					2	2
60	(Spain) Daniel Sosa	14								2	2
61	(Poland) Rafał Fiołek	37	25	23	35	37	14			2	2
62	(Republic of Ireland) Hannah McKillop	42	30		31	51		14		2	2
63	(France) Florian Barral	22	27	15	18	Ret				1	1
64	(Hungary) István Juhász	15	Ret		20	50				1	1

==== ERC3 ====
Pos	Co-Driver	ESP (Spain)	HUN (Hungary)	SWE (Sweden)	POL (Poland)	ITA (Italy)	CZE (Czech Republic)	GBR (United Kingdom)	CRO (Croatia)	Points	Best 7
1	(Poland) Jakub Wróbel	3		1	1	1	7	3		145	145
2	(Poland) Jarosław Hryniuk	6	3	Ret	5	2	1	2		131	131
3	(Poland) Michał Jurgała	9	5	6	7	5	5			88	88
4	(France) Florian Barral	1	6	3	3	Ret				87	87
5	(Poland) Daniel Dymurski	5	1	5		7				77	77
6	(Finland) Jarno Ottman		4	2	2					67	67
7	(Republic of Ireland) Lorcan Moore						2	1		54	54
8	(Croatia) Dora Ravenščak	4	Ret	Ret		6	4			53	53
9	(Poland) Kamil Kozdroń	2	9	4	Ret	Ret	Ret			52	52
10	(Republic of Ireland) Killian McArdle	8	Ret		6	3				47	47
11	(Poland) Łukasz Jastrzębski	7	Ret			Ret	6			28	28
12	(Sweden) Christoffer Bäck		Ret		10	4				26	26
13	(Hungary) Róbert Paizs		2							24	24
14	(Czech Republic) Zdeněk Omelka						3			21	21
15	(Poland) Michał Kuśnierz					4				19	19
16	(Romania) Denisa-Alexia Parteni		7		11					18	18
17	(Poland) Grzegorz Dachowski		8							11	11
18	(Poland) Michał Marczewski				8					11	11
19	(Australia) Daniel Brkic					8				11	11
20	(Poland) Szymon Marciniak				9					9	9

==== ERC4 ====
Pos	Co-Driver	ESP (Spain)	HUN (Hungary)	SWE (Sweden)	POL (Poland)	ITA (Italy)	CZE (Czech Republic)	GBR (United Kingdom)	CRO (Croatia)	Points	Best 7
1	(Norway) Jørgen Eriksen	2	1		1	1				114	114
2	(United Kingdom) Sion Williams	5	5		2	5	Ret	1		105	105
3	(Denmark) Ditte Kammersgaard	10	2	1	7					74	74
4	(Republic of Ireland) Conor Smith	4	Ret		Ret	4	1			68	68
5	(Estonia) Sander Pruul	3	4		Ret	3	Ret			61	61
6	(Spain) Axel Coronado	1	10		6	Ret				52	52
7	(Italy) Nicolò Lazzarini	Ret	Ret		9	7	4			41	41
8	(Republic of Ireland) Ayrton Sherlock	13	11		8	14	6			36	36
9	(Italy) Andrea Budoia	7	3		WD					34	34
10	(Austria) Christina Ettel	8	12			Ret	5			32	32
11	(Republic of Ireland) Hannah McKillop	15	8		4	20				31	31
12	(Finland) Veli-Pekka Karttunen		13		3	11				29	29
13	(Italy) Andrea Dal Maso	6	Ret		Ret		7			28	28
14	(Italy) Nicola Piagi					2				24	24
15	(Norway) Jørn Listerud						2			24	24
16	(Austria) Gerald Winter						3			21	21
17	(Estonia) Rainis Raidma	14	Ret		5					19	19
18	(Finland) Antti Linnaketo	Ret	6		12	17	Ret			19	19
19	(France) Pierre Blot					6				15	15
20	(Denmark) Jeannette Kvick		7							13	13
21	(Sweden) Jörgen Jönsson	11			10					12	12
22	(Italy) Nicolò Gonella					11				11	11
23	(Sweden) Torbjörn Carlberg						11			11	11
24	(Estonia) Fredi Kostikov		9			Ret				9	9
25	(Spain) Esther Gutiérrez	9								9	9
26	(San Marino) Daiana Darderi					9				9	9
27	(Italy) Martina Musiari					10				7	7
28	(Romania) Vlad Colceriu	19	Ret		11	25				5	5
29	(Belgium) Tom Buyse	12	Ret		Ret					4	4
30	(Austria) Jürgen Rausch					12				4	4
31	(San Marino) Valentina Pasini					13				3	3
32	(Romania) Mihai Supuran		14							2	2
33	(Poland) Łukasz Sitek					15				1	1

=== Teams' championship ===
Pos	Team	ESP (Spain)	HUN (Hungary)	SWE (Sweden)	POL (Poland)	ITA (Italy)	CZE (Czech Republic)	GBR (United Kingdom)	CRO (Croatia)	Points
1	(Poland) J2X Rally Team	1								30
1	(Poland) J2X Rally Team	DNS								30
2	(Spain) Recalvi Team	2								24
3	(Spain) Hyundai Motor España	3								21
4	(Hungary) TRT Rally Team	4								19
5	(Czech Republic) Kowax DST Racing	6								18
5	(Czech Republic) Kowax DST Racing	13								18
6	(India) Team MRF Tyres	5								17
6	(India) Team MRF Tyres	Ret								17
7	(Spain) Citroën Rally Team	7								13
8	(Hungary) B-A Promotion Kft.	8								11
9	(Hungary) Topp-Cars Rally Team	9								9
10	(Spain) RACC Motorsport	10								7
10	(Spain) RACC Motorsport	22								7
11	(Germany) ADAC Opel Rallye Junior Team	11								6
11	(Germany) ADAC Opel Rallye Junior Team	15								6
12	Team Estonia Autosport	12								4
12	Team Estonia Autosport	20								4
13	(Republic of Ireland) Motorsport Ireland Rally Academy	14								2
13	(Republic of Ireland) Motorsport Ireland Rally Academy	18								2

=== Tyre suppliers' trophy ===
Pos	Tyre supplier	ESP (Spain)	HUN (Hungary)	SWE (Sweden)	POL (Poland)	ITA (Italy)	CZE (Czech Republic)	GBR (United Kingdom)	CRO (Croatia)	Points
1	(Italy) Pirelli	3	5	1	3	1	2	1	1	323
1	(Italy) Pirelli	4	7	4	8	2	3	2	4	323
2	(France) Michelin	1	2	7	2	3	1	3	2	314
2	(France) Michelin	2	3	8	5	4	4	4	3	314
3	(India) MRF	6	1	2	1	6	7	5	6	213
3	(India) MRF	Ret	8	5	6	8	Ret	Ret	7	213
4	(South Korea) Hankook	5	4	3	4	5	5		5	209
4	(South Korea) Hankook	Ret	6	6	7	7	6		8	209
