= Renault Clio Rally3 =

Renault Rally3 rally car

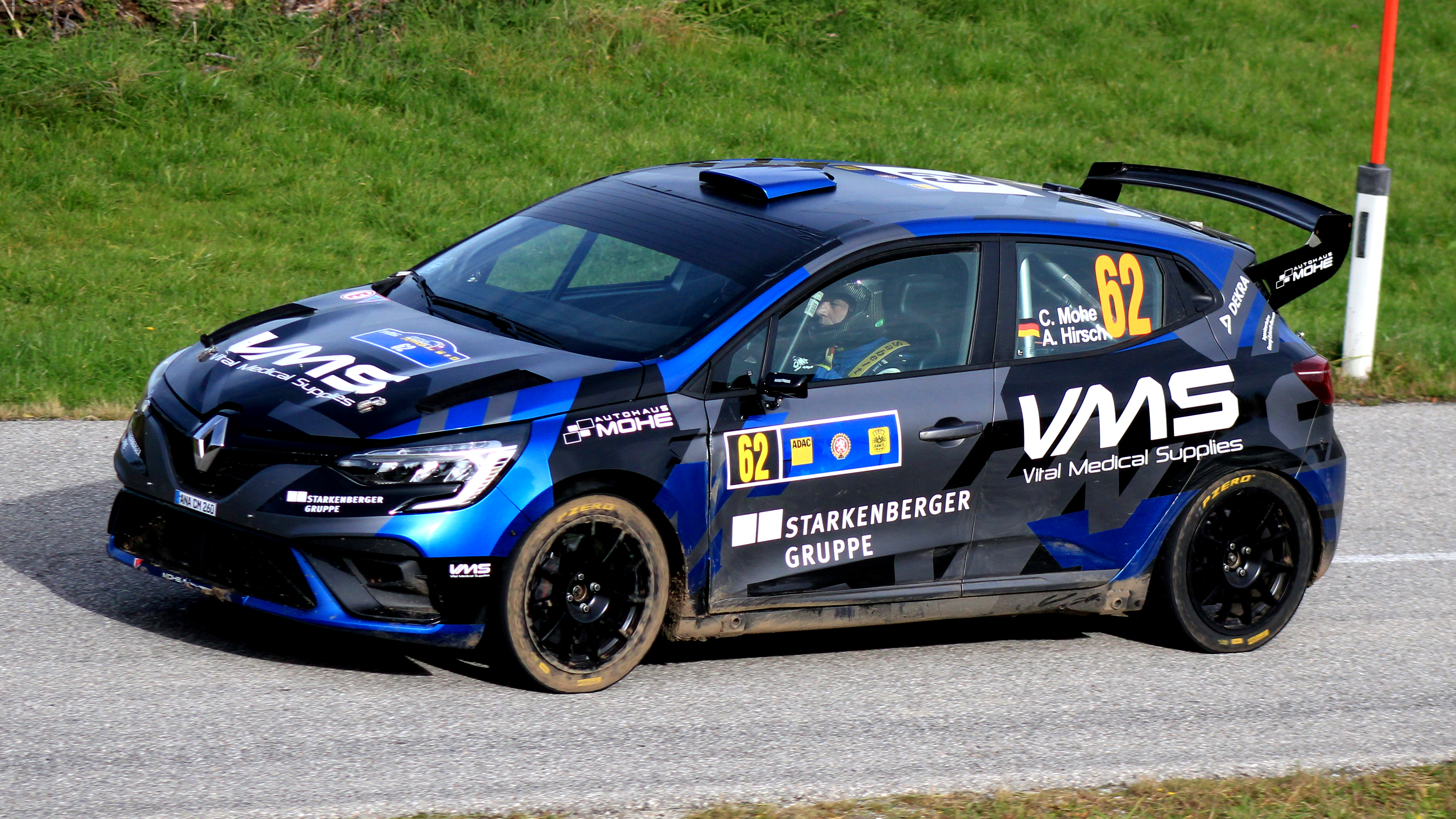
- Category: Rally3
- Constructor: Alpine Racing
- Designer: Yann Paranthoën

Technical specifications
- Chassis: Clio R.S. Line
- Suspension (front): Pseudo McPherson
- Suspension (rear): Pseudo McPherson
- Length: 4,050 mm
- Width: 1,988 mm
- Height: 1,400 mm
- Axle track: 1,520 mm
- Wheelbase: 2,585 mm
- Engine: Renault HR13 1,330 cc Turbo Front engine
- Transmission: Sadev ST4-82 5 plus reverse
- Weight: 1,210 kg

Competition history
- Debut: 2023

The Renault Clio Rally3 is a rally car developed and built by Alpine Racing (previously known as Renault Sport) to FIA's Group Rally3 regulations. It is based upon the Renault Clio road car and debuted in 2023.

== Development ==
The Renault Clio Rally3 was revealed in 2022. The car completes the Renault Clio ladder in relation to the Groups Rally regulation with its Rally4 and Rally5 variants, and would be Renault's first all-wheel drive challenger. The car is the straight rival to the Ford Fiesta Rally3 of M-Sport, which is only other available Rally3 car for competition.

During the period when the car is under development, it was testing in France in 2022. The car launched in the second half of 2023 and is eligible to compete in both European Rally Championship and World Rally Championship-3, as well as its junior category.

The car passed Fédération Internationale de l'Automobile homologation on 25 April 2023.

== Competition history ==
The car made its World Rally Championship debut at the 2023 Rally Finland, driven by Markus Manninen. It made its first appearance for World Rally Championship-3 points at the 2023 Acropolis Rally, driven by Efthimios Halkias. The car's debut win in the World Rally Championship-3 was at the 2024 Rally Latvia, driven by Joosep Ralf Nõgene. Mattéo Chatillon gave the car its second win in the category at the 2024 Central European Rally.

== Rally victories ==
=== WRC3 ===
Year	No.	Event	Surface	Driver	Co-driver
2024	1	2024 Rally Latvia	Gravel	(Estonia) Joosep Ralf Nõgene	(Estonia) Aleks Lesk
2024	2	(Europe) 2024 Central European Rally	Tarmac	(France) Mattéo Chatillon	(France) Maxence Cornuau
2025	3	(Monaco) 2025 Monte Carlo Rally	Mixed	(France) Arthur Pelamourgues	(France) Bastien Pouget
2025	4	(Spain) 2025 Rally Islas Canarias	Tarmac	(France) Mattéo Chatillon	(France) Maxence Cornuau
2025	5	2025 Rally Estonia	Gravel	(Japan) Takumi Matsushita	(Finland) Ville Mannisenmäki

=== ERC3 ===
Year	No.	Event	Surface	Driver	Co-driver
2025	1	(Czech Republic) 2025 Barum Czech Rally Zlín	Tarmac	(Poland) Hubert Kowalczyk	(Poland) Jarosław Hryniuk
2026	1	(Spain) 2026 Rally Sierra Morena	Tarmac	(France) Lucas Zielinski	(France) Ewen Leenhardt
