= MRF Racing =

Indian racing team

MRF Racing is an Indian racing team that competes in car racing and rallies.

== History ==
=== Open-wheel racing ===
MRF Challenge is an open-wheel formula racing series organized by MRF. The latest season consisted of races organized at Madras Motor Racing Track, Chennai, Bahrain International Circuit, Losail International Circuit, Doha and Buddh International Circuit, Noida. Freddie Hunt, son of 1976 Formula One champion James Hunt, Mathias Lauda, son of 1975, 1977 and 1984 Formula One champion Niki Lauda and Mick Schumacher, son of seven time Formula 1 champion Michael Schumacher competed in the series. MRF has sponsored Indian racing drivers including Narain Karthikeyan, Karun Chandok, Ashwin Sundar, N. Leelakrishnan and Raj Bharath.

=== Rallying ===
MRF have also been a long-running sponsor of MRF rally team participating in Asia-Pacific Rally Championship and Indian National Rally Championship. Associating with Czech car manufacturer Škoda, MRF Skoda is the three time reigning champion in Asia-Pacific Rally Championship with Chris Atkinson winning in 2012, Gaurav Gill in 2013 and Jan Kopecký in 2014. MRF also participates in Raid De Himalaya, the world's highest rally. The Indian National Rally Championship Overall winners (2022) Karna Kadur and Nikhil Pai also drive in the MRF colours.

==== European Rally Championship ====
Since 2020, Team MRF Tyres has contested the European Rally Championship. In 2020, they fielded two cars – a BRC-run Hyundai i20 R5 for Hyundai’s factory driver Craig Breen and a TGS-run Škoda Fabia Rally2 evo for Emil Lindholm. Breen eventually finished the championship in 7th and Lindholm in 15th, with MRF finishing 4th in the Teams championship.

In 2021 MRF entered a VW Polo GTI R5 for Simone Campedelli instead of WRC-2 bound Lindholm, while also continuing to field the BRC-run Hyundai. Craig Breen continued to drive, but left the team after three events. Different Hyundai-associated drivers would compete in the car for the remainder of the year, including Jari Huttunen, Dani Sordo and Nil Solans. MRF eventually finished the season in 5th.

In 2022, MRF expanded to enter a trio of Škodas for Campedelli, Norbert Herczig and 2021 runner-up Efrén Llarena. Javier Pardo Siota and Mārtiņš Sesks joined later in the season. Llarena scored his first ERC victory on Rallye Azores, with Sesks taking a dominant victory by winning every stage at his home Rally Liepāja. Llarena eventually won the championship, with Pardo in 2nd, Campedelli in 5th, Herczig in 9th and Sesks in 12th. MRF also won the Teams championship, leading Toksport WRT by 90 points.

In 2023, MRF entered two teams – Team MRF Tyres and MRF Tyres Dealer Team. They retained Llarena, Campedelli and Sesks, who were joined by Mads Østberg in a TRT-run Citroën C3 Rally2 and Andrea Mabellini in a Škoda. Pontus Tidemand, Jon Armstrong and Dennis Radström also appeared in a GN Motorsport-run Ford Fiesta Rally2, while Pardo drove a Hyundai i20 N Rally2 at Rally Islas Canarias. The team took two victories – in Poland Liepāja, courtesy of Mārtiņš Sesks, who eventually finished the season as runner-up. Østberg classified 3rd, with Llarena in 4th. The teams finished in 1st and 3rd, respectively.

In 2024, MRF downgraded to three cars for Llarena, Mabellini and Sesks, who switched the Škoda for a Toyota GR Yaris Rally2. The season proved to be challenging, with both Llarena and Sesks leaving mid-season. Amaury Molle and Simone Tempestini were later signed as their replacements. Mabellini took 2nd in Ceredigion and later won 2024 Rally Silesia, which allowed him to finish 4th in the overall standings. MRF eventually finished the championship in 2nd.

Tempestini is set to remain with MRF in 2025 behind the wheel of a Keane Motorsport-run Škoda, with James Williams and former Citroën factory driver Stéphane Lefebvre joining on selected events, both driving a Hyundai i20 N Rally2.

=== Others ===
MRF promotes a national motocross championship, a form of all-terrain two wheeler racing held on enclosed off-road circuits annually across several cities. MRF sponsors major karting championships in India. MRF is the first Indian tyre company to develop FIA approved karting tyres.

== Results ==
=== ERC results ===
Year	Entrant	Car	Driver	1	2	3	4	5	6	7	8	Drivers	Points	Teams	Points
2020	(India) Team MRF Tyres	Hyundai i20 R5	(Republic of Ireland) Craig Breen	ITA; 4	LAT; 4	POR; 16	HUN; Ret	ESP; 11				7th	49	4th	107
2020	(India) Team MRF Tyres	Škoda Fabia R5 evo	(Finland) Emil Lindholm	ITA; 9	LAT; 5	POR; Ret	HUN; 19	ESP				15th	27	4th	107
2021	(India) Team MRF Tyres	Hyundai i20 R5	(Republic of Ireland) Craig Breen	POL; 42	LAT; 2	ITA; 9	CZE	POR1	POR2	HUN	ESP	10th	43	5th	153
2021	(India) Team MRF Tyres	Volkswagen Polo GTI R5	(Italy) Simone Campedelli	POL; Ret	LAT	ITA; 17	CZE	POR1				11th	41	5th	153
2021	(India) Team MRF Tyres	Škoda Fabia Rally2 evo	(Italy) Simone Campedelli						POR2; 24	HUN; 5	ESP; 4	11th	41	5th	153
2021	(India) Team MRF Tyres	Hyundai i20 R5	(Finland) Jari Huttunen	POL	LAT	ITA	CZE; Ret	POR1	POR2	HUN	ESP	NC	0	5th	153
2021	(India) Team MRF Tyres	Hyundai i20 R5	(Spain) Dani Sordo	POL	LAT	ITA	CZE	POR1; 2	POR2; 12	HUN	ESP	12th	40	5th	153
2021	(India) Team MRF Tyres	Hyundai i20 N Rally2	(Spain) Nil Solans	POL	LAT	ITA	CZE	POR1	POR2	HUN; Ret		7th	4 (50) (Note: Non-bracketed number refers to the number accumulated with team, with number in brackets referring to the total accumulated for the season.)	5th	153
2021	(India) Team MRF Tyres	Hyundai i20 R5	(Spain) Nil Solans								ESP; 12	7th	4 (50)	5th	153
2022	(India) Team MRF Tyres	Škoda Fabia Rally2 evo	(Spain) Efrén Llarena	POR1; 10	POR2; 1	ESP1; 2	POL; 4	LAT; 2	ITA; 4	CZE; Ret	ESP2; 2	1st	166	1st	326
2022	(India) Team MRF Tyres	Škoda Fabia Rally2 evo	(Hungary) Norbert Herczig	POR1; Ret	POR2; 8	ESP1; 9	POL; 10	LAT	ITA; 10	CZE; 5	ESP2	9th	55	1st	326
2022	(India) Team MRF Tyres	Škoda Fabia Rally2 evo	(Italy) Simone Campedelli	POR1; Ret	POR2; 7	ESP1; 5	POL; 35	LAT	ITA; 2	CZE; 6	ESP2	5th	71	1st	326
2022	(India) Team MRF Tyres	Škoda Fabia Rally2 evo	(Spain) Javier Pardo	POR1	POR2	ESP1	POL	LAT; 8	ITA; 7	CZE; 10	ESP2; 3	2nd	55 (96)	1st	326
2022	(India) Team MRF Tyres	Škoda Fabia Rally2 evo	(Latvia) Mārtiņš Sesks	POR1	POR2	ESP1	POL	LAT; 1	ITA; 31	CZE	ESP2	12th	35 (42)	1st	326
2023	(India) Team MRF Tyres	Škoda Fabia RS Rally2	(Spain) Efrén Llarena	POR; 7	ESP; 3	POL; 10			ITA; 4			4th	88	1st	271
2023	(India) Team MRF Tyres	Škoda Fabia Rally2 evo	(Spain) Efrén Llarena				LAT; 9	SWE; Ret				4th	88	1st	271
2023	(India) Team MRF Tyres	Škoda Fabia R5	(Spain) Efrén Llarena							CZE; 8	HUN; 10	4th	88	1st	271
2023	(India) Team MRF Tyres	Škoda Fabia Rally2 evo	(Italy) Simone Campedelli	POR; 23	ESP; Ret	POL; 15	LAT; 10	SWE; Ret	ITA; 11	CZE	HUN	33rd	14	1st	271
2023	(India) Team MRF Tyres	Škoda Fabia RS Rally2	(Latvia) Mārtiņš Sesks	POR; 12	ESP; 8	POL; 1	LAT; 1	SWE; 3	ITA; Ret	CZE; 11	HUN; 3	2nd	134	1st	271
2023	(India) MRF Tyres Dealer Team	Citroën C3 Rally2	(Norway) Mads Østberg	POR; 2	ESP; 16	POL; 4	LAT; 3	SWE; 8	ITA	CZE; Ret	HUN	3rd	80 (115)	3rd	150
2023	(India) MRF Tyres Dealer Team	Ford Fiesta Rally2	(Sweden) Pontus Tidemand	POR; 13	ESP	POL; 13	LAT	SWE	ITA	CZE	HUN	38th	6	3rd	150
2023	(India) MRF Tyres Dealer Team	Škoda Fabia Rally2 evo	(Italy) Andrea Mabellini	POR; Ret	ESP; 13	POL; Ret	LAT; 13	SWE; 9	ITA; 10	CZE	HUN	17th	32	3rd	150
2023	(India) MRF Tyres Dealer Team	Hyundai i20 N Rally2	(Spain) Javier Pardo	POR	ESP; Ret	POL	LAT	SWE	ITA	CZE	HUN	NC	0	3rd	150
2023	(India) MRF Tyres Dealer Team	Ford Fiesta Rally2	(United Kingdom) Jon Armstrong	POR	ESP	POL	LAT	SWE; 11	ITA	CZE	HUN	39th	5	3rd	150
2023	(India) MRF Tyres Dealer Team	Renault Clio Rally3	(Italy) Paolo Andreucci	POR	ESP	POL	LAT	SWE	ITA; 20	CZE	HUN	NC	0	3rd	150
2024	(India) Team MRF Tyres	Škoda Fabia RS Rally2	(Spain) Efrén Llarena	HUN; Ret	ESP; 12	SWE; 14	EST	ITA	CZE	GBR	POL	10th	6 (45)	2nd	167
2024	(India) Team MRF Tyres	Toyota GR Yaris Rally2	(Latvia) Mārtiņš Sesks	HUN; Ret	ESP; 23	SWE; 6	EST; 14	ITA	CZE	GBR	POL	28th	17	2nd	167
2024	(India) Team MRF Tyres	Škoda Fabia RS Rally2	(Italy) Andrea Mabellini	HUN; 7	ESP; 17	SWE; 9	EST; 8	ITA; 9	CZE; 16	GBR; 2	POL; 1	4th	101	2nd	167
2024	(India) Team MRF Tyres	Citroën C3 Rally2	(Italy) Paolo Andreucci	HUN	ESP	SWE	EST	ITA; Ret	CZE	GBR	POL	NC	0	2nd	167
2024	(India) Team MRF Tyres	Škoda Fabia Rally2 evo	(Belgium) Amaury Molle	HUN	ESP	SWE	EST	ITA	CZE; Ret	GBR	POL; 22	NC	0	2nd	167
2024	(India) Team MRF Tyres	Volkswagen Polo GTI R5	(Romania) Simone Tempestini	HUN	ESP	SWE	EST	ITA	CZE	GBR; Ret		6th	0 (59)	2nd	167
2024	(India) Team MRF Tyres	Škoda Fabia RS Rally2	(Romania) Simone Tempestini								POL; Ret	6th	0 (59)	2nd	167
2024	(India) Team MRF Tyres	Toyota GR Yaris Rally2	(United Kingdom) Meirion Evans	HUN	ESP	SWE	EST	ITA	CZE	GBR	POL; Ret	NC	0	2nd	167
2025	(India) Team MRF Tyres	Škoda Fabia RS Rally2	(Romania) Simone Tempestini	ESP; Ret	HUN; Ret	SWE; 9	POL; 6	ITA; Ret	CZE	GBR	CRO	12th*	27*	1st*	163*
2025	(India) Team MRF Tyres	Hyundai i20 N Rally2	(France) Stéphane Lefebvre	ESP; 9	HUN	SWE	POL	ITA				24th	9 (14)*	1st*	163*
2025	(India) Team MRF Tyres	Toyota GR Yaris Rally2	(France) Stéphane Lefebvre						CZE; WD	GBR	CRO	24th	9 (14)*	1st*	163*
2025	(India) Team MRF Tyres	Hyundai i20 N Rally2	(United Kingdom) James Williams	ESP; Ret	HUN	SWE	POL	ITA	CZE	GBR	CRO	NC	0	1st*	163*
2025	(India) Team MRF Tyres	Toyota GR Yaris Rally2	(Finland) Roope Korhonen	ESP	HUN; 1	SWE; 2	POL; Ret	ITA; Ret	CZE	GBR	CRO	4th*	60*	1st*	163*
2025	(India) Team MRF Tyres	Citroën C3 Rally2	(Hungary) Miklós Csomós	ESP	HUN; 38	SWE	POL	ITA				NC	0	1st*	163*
2025	(India) Team MRF Tyres	Škoda Fabia RS Rally2	(Hungary) Miklós Csomós						CZE	GBR	CRO	NC	0	1st*	163*
2025	(India) Team MRF Tyres	Citroën C3 Rally2	(United Kingdom) Max McRae	ESP	HUN; Ret	SWE	POL	ITA	CZE	GBR	CRO	33rd*	0 (5)*	1st*	163*
2025	(India) Team MRF Tyres	Volkswagen Polo GTI R5	(Norway) Frank Tore Larsen	ESP	HUN	SWE; 5	POL	ITA	CZE	GBR	CRO	16th*	19*	1st*	163*
2025	(India) Team MRF Tyres	Škoda Fabia RS Rally2	(Latvia) Mārtiņš Sesks	ESP	HUN	SWE	POL; 1	ITA	CZE	GBR	CRO	8th*	35*	1st*	163*
2025	(India) Team MRF Tyres	Toyota GR Yaris Rally2	(Spain) Jan Solans	ESP	HUN	SWE	POL	ITA; 17	CZE	GBR	CRO	NC	0	1st*	163*
2025	(India) Team MRF Tyres	Toyota GR Yaris Rally2	(Finland) Benjamin Korhola	ESP	HUN	SWE	POL	ITA; 54	CZE	GBR	CRO	NC	0	1st*	163*
2025	(India) Team MRF Tyres	Škoda Fabia RS Rally2	(United Kingdom) Chris Ingram	ESP	HUN	SWE	POL	ITA	CZE	GBR	CRO	–	–	1st*	163*
2025	(India) MRF Tyres Dealer Team	Toyota GR Yaris Rally2	(France) Stéphane Lefebvre	ESP	HUN	SWE; 11	POL; Ret	ITA	CZE	GBR	CRO	24th	5 (14)*	6th*	37*
2025	(India) MRF Tyres Dealer Team	Citroën C3 Rally2	(United Kingdom) Max McRae	ESP	HUN	SWE; 24	POL; 11	ITA; Ret	CZE; WD	GBR	CRO	33rd*	5*	6th*	37*

- Season still in progress
