= Roberto Daprà =

Italian rally driver

Personal information
- Nationality: (Italy) Italian
- Born: 25 April 2001 (age 25); Trento, Italy

World Rally Championship record
- Years active: 2024–present
- Co-driver: (Italy) Luca Guglielmetti
- Rallies: 20
- Championships: 0
- Rally wins: 0
- Podiums: 0
- Stage wins: 0
- Total points: 8
- First rally: 2024 Monte Carlo Rally
- Last rally: 2026 Rally Italia Sardegna

Roberto Daprà (born 25 April 2001) is an Italian rally driver.

== Biography ==
Daprà made his rally career debut in 2019. He scored his first WRC points at the 2025 Rally Italia Sardegna, by winning the WRC2 category.

== Rally results ==
=== WRC results ===
| Year | Entrant | Car | 1 | 2 | 3 | 4 | 5 | 6 | 7 | 8 | 9 | 10 | 11 | 12 | 13 | 14 | Pos. | Points |
|---|---|---|---|---|---|---|---|---|---|---|---|---|---|---|---|---|---|---|
| 2022 | Roberto Daprà | Ford Fiesta Rally4 | MON; 32 | SWE | CRO | POR | ITA | KEN | EST | FIN | BEL | GRE | NZL | ESP | JPN | | NC | 0 |
| 2024 | Roberto Daprà | Škoda Fabia Rally2 evo | MON; 33 | SWE | KEN | CRO; 16 | POR; 16 | ITA; 14 | POL; 21 | LAT; 17 | FIN | GRE; 10 | CHL | EUR | JPN | | NC | 0 |
| 2025 | Roberto Daprà | Škoda Fabia RS Rally2 | MON; 14 | SWE | KEN | ESP; 15 | POR; 16 | ITA; 9 | GRE; 18 | EST | FIN | PAR | CHL | EUR; 11 | JPN | SAU | 21st | 2 |
| 2026 | Roberto Daprà | Škoda Fabia RS Rally2 | MON; 8 | SWE | KEN | CRO; 9 | ESP; 13 | POR; 27 | JPN | GRE; 35 | EST | FIN | PAR | CHL | ITA; 12 | | 23rd | 6 |

* Season still in progress.

=== WRC-2 results ===
| Year | Entrant | Car | 1 | 2 | 3 | 4 | 5 | 6 | 7 | 8 | 9 | 10 | 11 | 12 | 13 | 14 | Pos. | Points |
|---|---|---|---|---|---|---|---|---|---|---|---|---|---|---|---|---|---|---|
| 2024 | Roberto Daprà | Škoda Fabia Rally2 evo | MON; 14 | SWE | KEN | CRO; 7 | POR; 9 | ITA; 9 | POL; 13 | LAT; 6 | FIN | GRE; 7 | CHL | EUR | JPN | | 17th | 24 |
| 2025 | Roberto Daprà | Škoda Fabia RS Rally2 | MON; 5 | SWE | KEN | ESP; 7 | POR; 6 | ITA; 1 | GRE; 11 | EST | FIN | PAR | CHL | EUR; 3 | JPN | SAU | 8th | 64 |
| 2026 | Roberto Daprà | Škoda Fabia RS Rally2 | MON; 2 | SWE | KEN | CRO; 6 | ESP; 4 | POR; 13 | JPN | GRE; 17 | EST | FIN | PAR | CHL | ITA; 5 | | 10th | 47 |

* Season still in progress.

=== ERC results ===
| Year | Entrant | Car | 1 | 2 | 3 | 4 | 5 | 6 | 7 | 8 | Pos. | Points |
|---|---|---|---|---|---|---|---|---|---|---|---|---|
| 2022 | Roberto Daprà | Ford Fiesta Rally4 | PRT1; 22 | PRT2; Ret | ESP1; 23 | POL; 38 | LAT; 34 | | | | 42nd | 7 |
| 2022 | Roberto Daprà | Renault Clio Rally4 | | | | | | ITA; 21 | CZE; Ret | ESP2; 10 | 42nd | 7 |
| 2024 | Roberto Daprà | Škoda Fabia RS Rally2 | HUN | CAN | SWE | EST | ITA; 12 | CZE | GBR | POL | 56th | 4 |
| 2025 | Roberto Daprà | Škoda Fabia RS Rally2 | ESP | HUN | SWE | POL | ITA; 4 | CZE | GBR | CRO | 20th | 23 |
