= 2022 Rally Catalunya =

2022 Rally Catalunya may refer to:

- 2022 Rally Catalunya (European Rally Championship), final round of the 2022 European Rally Championship
- 2022 Rally Catalunya (World Rally Championship), penultimate round of the 2022 World Rally Championship
