= 2022 Rally Catalunya (European Rally Championship) =

Motor racing competition

2022 Rally Catalunya RallyRACC Catalunya - Costa Daurada 2022
Round 8 of 8 in the 2022 European Rally Championship
← Previous event
- Host country: Spain
- Rally base: Salou, Catalonia
- Dates run: 20 – 22 October 2022
- Start location: Lleida, Catalonia
- Finish location: El Montmell, Catalonia
- Stages: 14 (235.52 km; 146.35 miles)
- Stage surface: Tarmac
- Transport distance: 832.71 km (517.42 miles)
- Overall distance: 1,068.23 km (663.77 miles)

Statistics
- Crews registered: 21

The 2022 Rally Catalunya (also known as the RallyRACC Catalunya - Costa Daurada 2022) was a motor racing event for rally cars held over three days between 20 and 22 October 2022. It was the 57th running of the Rally de Catalunya. The event was the final round of the 2022 European Rally Championship and its support categories. The 2022 event was based in Salou in the province of Tarragona in Catalonia and was contested over fourteen special stages covering a total competitive distance of 235.52 km (146.35 mi).

== Background ==
=== Entry list ===
A total of twenty-one crews entered with European Rally Championship eligibility.

Rally2 entries competing in the European Rally Championship
| No. | Driver | Co-Driver | Entrant | Car | Championship eligibility | Tyre |
|---|---|---|---|---|---|---|
| 101 | (Spain) Efrén Llarena | (Spain) Sara Fernández | (India) Team MRF Tyres | Škoda Fabia Rally2 evo | Driver, Co-driver, Team | M |
| 102 | (France) Yoann Bonato | (France) Benjamin Boulloud | (France) Yoann Bonato | Citroën C3 Rally2 | Driver, Co-driver | M |
| 103 | (Italy) Alberto Battistolli | (Italy) Simone Scattolin | (Italy) Alberto Battistolli | Škoda Fabia Rally2 evo | Driver, Co-driver | P |
| 104 | (Spain) Javier Pardo | (Spain) Adrián Pérez | (India) Team MRF Tyres | Škoda Fabia Rally2 evo | Driver, Co-Driver, Team | M |
| 105 | (Hungary) Martin László | (Hungary) Dávid Berendi | (Hungary) Topp-Cars Rally Team | Škoda Fabia Rally2 evo | Driver, Co-Driver, Team | P |
| 106 | (Spain) Xavier Pons | (Spain) Álex Haro | (Spain) Xavier Pons | Škoda Fabia Rally2 evo | Driver, Co-driver | H |

Rally2 Kit entries competing in the European Rally Championship
| No. | Driver | Co-Driver | Entrant | Car | Championship eligibility | Tyre |
|---|---|---|---|---|---|---|
| 107 | (Andorra) Joan Vinyes | (Spain) Jordi Mercader | (Spain) Suzuki Motor Ibérica | Suzuki Swift R4LLY S | Driver, Co-driver, Team | M |
| 108 | (Spain) Alberto Monarri | (Spain) Borja Odriozola | (Spain) Suzuki Motor Ibérica | Suzuki Swift R4LLY S | Driver, Co-driver, Team | M |

Rally3 entries competing in the European Rally Championship-3
| No. | Driver | Co-Driver | Entrant | Car | Championship eligibility | Tyre |
|---|---|---|---|---|---|---|
| 109 | (Ukraine) Anton Korzun | (Ukraine) Pavlo Kononov | (Ukraine) Anton Korzun | Ford Fiesta Rally3 | Driver, Co-driver | P |

Rally4 entries competing in the European Rally Championship-4
| No. | Driver | Co-Driver | Entrant | Car | Championship eligibility | Tyre |
|---|---|---|---|---|---|---|
| 110 | (France) Laurent Pellier | (France) Marine Pelamourgues | (Germany) ADAC Opel Rallye Junior Team | Opel Corsa Rally4 | Driver, Co-driver, Team, Junior ERC | P |
| 111 | (Italy) Andrea Mabellini | (Italy) Virginia Lenzi | (Germany) Toksport WRT | Renault Clio Rally4 | Driver, Co-driver, Team, Junior ERC | P |
| 112 | (Spain) Óscar Palomo | (Spain) Ángel L. Vela | Rallye Team Spain | Peugeot 208 Rally4 | Driver, Co-driver, Team, Junior ERC | P |
| 113 | (Spain) Diego Ruiloba | (Spain) Andrés Blanco | (Spain) VolanFapa | Peugeot 208 Rally4 | Driver, Co-driver, Team | P |
| 114 | (Finland) Toni Herranen | (Finland) Sebastian Virtanen | (Finland) Toni Herranen | Ford Fiesta Rally4 | Driver, Co-driver, Junior ERC | P |
| 115 | (Italy) Roberto Daprà | (Italy) Luca Guglielmetti | (Italy) Roberto Daprà | Renault Clio Rally4 | Driver, Co-driver, Junior ERC | P |
| 116 | (Portugal) Luís Morais | (Portugal) Paulo Silva | (Portugal) Luís Morais | Peugeot 208 Rally4 | Driver, Co-driver | P |
| 117 | (Spain) Iago Gabeiras | (Spain) Brais Mirón | (Spain) Iago Gabeiras | Peugeot 208 Rally4 | Driver, Co-driver | P |
| 118 | (Germany) Nick Loof | (Germany) Pascal Raabe | (Germany) Nick Loof | Ford Fiesta Rally4 | Driver, Co-driver, Junior ERC | P |
| 119 | (Spain) Adrià Serratosa | (Spain) Eric Bellver | (Spain) Escuderia Baix Emporda | Peugeot 208 Rally4 | Driver, Co-driver, Team | P |
| 120 | (Romania) Cristiana Opera | (Romania) Alexia-Denisa Parteni | (Romania) Cristiana Opera | Peugeot 208 R2 | Driver, Co-driver | M |
| 121 | (Republic of Ireland) Ryan Caldwell | (Republic of Ireland) Grace O'Brien | (Republic of Ireland) Ryan Caldwell | Ford Fiesta Rally4 | Driver, Co-driver | P |

=== Itinerary ===
All dates and times are CEST (UTC+2).

| Date | Time | No. | Stage name | Distance |
|---|---|---|---|---|
| 20 October | 0:00 | — | Coll de la Teixeta [Shakedown] | 4.21 km |
| 21 October | 10:23 | SS1 | Els Omells — Maldà 1 | 11.05 km |
| 21 October | 11:23 | SS2 | Serra de la Llena 1 | 11.79 km |
| 21 October | 12:26 | SS3 | Les Garrigues Altes 1 | 22.64 km |
| 21 October | 13:26 | SS4 | Riba-roja 1 | 13.98 km |
| 21 October | 16:59 | SS5 | Els Omells — Maldà 2 | 11.05 km |
| 21 October | 17:59 | SS6 | Serra de la Llena 2 | 11.79 km |
| 21 October | 18:52 | SS7 | Les Garrigues Altes 2 | 22.64 km |
| 21 October | 19:52 | SS8 | Riba-roja 2 | 13.98 km |
| 22 October | 10:34 | SS9 | Savallà 1 | 13.93 km |
| 22 October | 11:27 | SS10 | Querol — Les Pobles 1 | 20.19 km |
| 22 October | 12:28 | SS11 | El Montmell 1 | 24.18 km |
| 22 October | 16:04 | SS12 | Savallà 2 | 13.93 km |
| 22 October | 16:57 | SS13 | Querol — Les Pobles 2 | 20.19 km |
| 22 October | 17:58 | SS14 | El Montmell 2 [Power Stage] | 24.18 km |

== Report ==
=== ERC Rally2 (Kit) ===
==== Special stages ====
| Stage | Winners | Car | Time | Class leaders |
|---|---|---|---|---|
| SD | | | | —N/a |
| SS1 | | | | |
| SS2 | | | | |
| SS3 | | | | |
| SS4 | | | | |
| SS5 | | | | |
| SS6 | | | | |
| SS7 | | | | |
| SS8 | | | | |
| SS9 | | | | |
| SS10 | | | | |
| SS11 | | | | |
| SS12 | | | | |
| SS13 | | | | |
| SS14 | | | | |

=== ERC-3 Rally3 ===
==== Special stages ====
| Stage | Winners | Car | Time | Class leaders |
|---|---|---|---|---|
| SD | | | | —N/a |
| SS1 | | | | |
| SS2 | | | | |
| SS3 | | | | |
| SS4 | | | | |
| SS5 | | | | |
| SS6 | | | | |
| SS7 | | | | |
| SS8 | | | | |
| SS9 | | | | |
| SS10 | | | | |
| SS11 | | | | |
| SS12 | | | | |
| SS13 | | | | |
| SS14 | | | | |

=== ERC-4 Rally4 ===
==== Special stages ====
| Stage | Winners | Car | Time | Class leaders |
|---|---|---|---|---|
| SD | | | | —N/a |
| SS1 | | | | |
| SS2 | | | | |
| SS3 | | | | |
| SS4 | | | | |
| SS5 | | | | |
| SS6 | | | | |
| SS7 | | | | |
| SS8 | | | | |
| SS9 | | | | |
| SS10 | | | | |
| SS11 | | | | |
| SS12 | | | | |
| SS13 | | | | |
| SS14 | | | | |
