= 2022 Azores Rallye =

Motor racing competition

Round 2 of 8 in the 2022 European Rally Championship
← Previous event	Next event →
- Host country: Portugal
- Rally base: Ponta Delgada, Azores
- Dates run: 25 – 27 March 2022
- Start location: Coroa da Mata
- Finish location: Ribeira Brava
- Stages: 14 (including 1 cancelled) (204.26 km; 126.92 miles)
- Stage surface: Gravel
- Transport distance: 408.39 km (253.76 miles)
- Overall distance: 612.65 km (380.68 miles)

Statistics
- Crews registered: 66
- Crews: 66 at start, 42 at finish

Overall results
- Overall winner: Efren Llarena; Sara Fernandez; Team MRF Tyres; 2:24:58.3
- Power Stage winner: Efren Llarena; Sara Fernandez; Team MRF Tyres; 6:03.6

The 2022 Azores Rallye was the 56th edition of Rallye Açores and took place between March 24 and 26, 2022. The event was the second round of the 2022 European Rally Championship. The event was based in Ponta Delgada and was contested over 14 stages.

== Background ==
The event was opened to crews competing in European Rally Championship with its support categories and any private crews. Overall of 66 crews entered the event, with 42 crews entering ERC and 12 crews entering Portuguese Rally Championship.

=== Entry list ===
Rally2 ERC Entries
No.	Driver	Co-Driver	Car	Entrant	Car Running Team	Championship eligibility	Tyre
1	(Portugal) Armindo Araujo	(Portugal) Luis Ramalho	Škoda Fabia Rally2 evo	(Portugal) Armindo Araujo	(Portugal) The Racing Factory	Driver, Co-driver, Team	M
2	(Italy) Alberto Battistolli	(Italy) Simone Scattolin	Škoda Fabia Rally2 evo	(Italy) Alberto Battistolli	(Italy) Krent S.r.l.	Driver, Co-driver, Team	P
3	(Spain) Javier Pardo	(Spain) Adrian Perez	Škoda Fabia Rally2 evo	(Spain) Javier Pardo	(Spain) Race Seven	Driver, Co-driver, Team	M
4	(Portugal) Bruno Magalhaes	(Portugal) Carlos Magalhaes	Hyundai i20 N Rally2	Team Hyundai Portugal	(Portugal) Sports&You	Driver, Co-driver, Team	M
5	(Portugal) Jose Pedro Fontes	(Portugal) Ines Ponte	Citroën C3 Rally2	(Portugal) Citroen Vodafone Team	(Portugal) Sports&You	Driver, Co-driver, Team	P
6	(Portugal) Ricardo Teodosio	(Portugal) Jose Teixeira	Hyundai i20 N Rally2	Team Hyundai Portugal	(Germany) Hyundai Motorsport	Driver, Co-driver, Team	P
7	(Portugal) Pedro Almeida	(Portugal) Mario Castro	Škoda Fabia Rally2 evo	(Portugal) Pedro Almeida	(Portugal) The Racing Factory	Driver, Co-driver, Team	P
8	(Spain) Efren Llarena	(Spain) Sara Fernandez	Škoda Fabia Rally2 evo	(India) Team MRF Tyres	(Spain) Race Seven	Driver, Co-driver, Team	M
9	(Estonia) Ken Torn	(Estonia) Kauri Pannas	Ford Fiesta Rally2	(Poland) Plon Rally Team	(Poland) Jarosław Kołtun	Driver, Co-driver, Team	P
10	(Spain) Luis Vilariño	(Spain) Javier Martinez	Škoda Fabia Rally2 evo	(Portugal) Luis Vilariño	(Portugal) Luis Vilariño	Driver, Co-driver, Team	M
11	(Brazil) Paulo Nobre	(Brazil) Gabriel Morales	Škoda Fabia R5	(Brazil) Paulo Nobre	(Italy) Motorsport Italia	Driver, Co-driver, Team	P
12	(Hungary) Norbert Herczig	(Slovenia) Igor Bacigal	Škoda Fabia Rally2 evo	(India) Team MRF Tyres	Eurosol Racing Team Hungary	Driver, Co-driver, Team	M
14	(Italy) Simone Campedelli	(Italy) Tania Canton	Škoda Fabia Rally2 evo	(India) Team MRF Tyres	(Italy) Step Five Motorsport	Driver, Co-driver, Team	M
15	(Portugal) Ricardo Moura	(Portugal) Antonio Costa	Škoda Fabia Rally2 evo	(Portugal) Ricardo Moura	(Portugal) ARC Sport	Driver, Co-driver, Team	M
16	(Romania) Simone Tempestini	(Romania) Sergio Itu	Škoda Fabia Rally2 evo	(Romania) Simone Tempestini	(Czech Republic) Keane Motorsport	Driver, Co-driver, Team	M
17	(Portugal) Miguel Correia	(Portugal) Jorge Carvalho	Škoda Fabia Rally2 evo	(Portugal) Miguel Correia	(Portugal) ARC Sport	Driver, Co-driver, Team	M
18	(Portugal) Ruben Rodrigues	(Portugal) Estevao Rodrigues	Citroën C3 Rally2	(Portugal) AutoAcoreana Racing	(Portugal) PT Racing	Driver, Co-driver, Team	M
19	(Poland) Łukasz Kotarba	(Poland) Tomasz Kotarba	Citroën C3 Rally2	(Poland) BTH Import Stal Rally Team	(Poland) BTH Rally Team	Driver, Co-driver, Team	M
20	(Portugal) Luis Rego Jr	(Portugal) Jorge Henriques	Škoda Fabia Rally2 evo	(Portugal) Luis Rego Jr	(Portugal) ARC Sport	Driver, Co-driver, Team	M
21	(Austria) Simon Wagner	(Austria) Gerald Winter	Škoda Fabia Rally2 evo	Eurosol Racing Team Hungary	(Portugal) The Racing Factory	Driver, Co-driver, Team	M
22	(Italy) Rachele Somaschini	(Italy) Nicola Arena	Citroën C3 Rally2	(Italy) Rachele Somaschini	(Italy) RS Team srls	Driver, Co-driver, Team	P
23	(Portugal) Aloisio Monteiro	(Portugal) Sancho Eiro	Škoda Fabia R5	(Portugal) Aloisio Monteiro	(Portugal) Rafael Botelho	Driver, Co-driver, Team	P
24	(Portugal) Pedro Camara	(Portugal) Joao Camara	Citroën C3 Rally2	(Portugal) Play Racing	(Portugal) Sports&You	Driver, Co-driver, Team	P
Rally2-Kit / R4 Entries
25	(Spain) Alberto Monarri	(Spain) Carlos Cancela	Suzuki Swift R4LLY S	(Spain) Suzuki Motor Iberica	(Spain) Suzuki Motor Iberica	Driver, Co-driver, Team	P
26	(Andorra) Joan Vinyes	(Spain) Jordi Mercader	Suzuki Swift R4LLY S	(Spain) Suzuki Motor Iberica	(Spain) Suzuki Motor Iberica	Driver, Co-driver, Team	P
40	(Latvia) Martins Sesks	(Latvia) Renars Francis	Ŝkoda Fabia Rally2-Kit	(Lithuania) Proracing Rally Team	(Lithuania) Proracing Rally Team	Driver, Co-driver, Team	P
