= 2022 Rally Liepāja =

Motor racing event

2022 Rally Liepaja Tet Rally Liepaja 2022
Round 5 of 8 in the 2022 European Rally Championship
← Previous event	Next event →
- Host country: Latvia
- Rally base: Talsi, Talsi Municipality
- Dates run: 1 – 3 July 2022
- Start location: TBA
- Finish location: TBA
- Stages: 12 (181.01 km; 112.47 miles)
- Stage surface: Gravel
- Transport distance: 676.91 km (420.61 miles)
- Overall distance: 857.92 km (533.09 miles)

Statistics
- Crews registered: 50
- Crews: TBA at start, TBA at finish

Overall results
- Overall winner: TBA; TBA; TBA; TBA
- Power Stage winner: TBA; TBA; TBA; TBA

The 2022 Rally Liepāja (also known as Tet Rally Liepaja 2022) was the 10th edition of Rally Liepāja and took place between July 1 and 3, 2022. The event was the fifth round of the 2022 European Rally Championship. The event was based in Talsi and is set to be contested over 12 stages.

== Background ==
The event was opened to crews competing in European Rally Championship with its support categories and any private crews. An overall of 50 crews entered the event, with 45 crews entering ERC.

=== Entry list ===
Rally2 ERC Entries
No.	Driver	Co-Driver	Car	Entrant	Car Running Team	Championship eligibility	Tyre
1	(Spain) Efren Llarena	(Spain) Sara Fernandez	Škoda Fabia Rally2 evo	(India) Team MRF Tyres	(Spain) Race Seven	Driver, Co-driver, Team	MR
2	(Spain) Nil Solans	(Spain) Marc Marti	Hyundai i20 N Rally2	(Spain) Nil Solans	(Czech Republic) Kowax 2BRally Racing	Driver, Co-driver, Team	P
3	(Romania) Simone Tempestini	(Romania) Sergio Itu	Škoda Fabia Rally2 evo	(Romania) Simone Tempestini	(Czech Republic) Keane Motorsport	Driver, Co-driver, Team	TBA
4	(Spain) Javier Pardo	(Spain) Adrian Perez	Škoda Fabia Rally2 evo	(India) Team MRF Tyres	(Spain) Race Seven	Driver, Co-driver, Team	MR
5	(Italy) Alberto Battistolli	(Italy) Simone Scattolin	Škoda Fabia Rally2 evo	(Italy) Alberto Battistolli	(Italy) Krent S.r.l.	Driver, Co-driver, Team	P
6	(Estonia) Ken Torn	(Estonia) Kauri Pannas	Ford Fiesta Rally2	(Poland) Plon Rally Team	(Poland) Jarosław Kołtun	Driver, Co-driver, Team	TBA
7	(Austria) Simon Wagner	(Slovenia) Pia Sumer	Škoda Fabia Rally2 evo	Eurosol Racing Team Hungary	Eurosol Racing Team Hungary	Driver, Co-driver, Team	TBA
8	(Sweden) Tom Kristensson	(Sweden) Andreas Johansson	Hyundai i20 R5	(Czech Republic) Kowax 2BRally Racing	(Czech Republic) Kowax 2BRally Racing	Driver, Co-driver, Team	P
9	(France) Yoann Bonato	(France) Benjamin Boulloud	Citroën C3 Rally2	(France) Yoann Bonato	(France) CHL Sport Auto	Driver, Co-driver, Team	MI
10	(Spain) Josep Bassas Mas	(Spain) Axel Coronado	Škoda Fabia R5	(Spain) Josep Bassas Mas	(Portugal) Rafael Botelho	Driver, Co-driver, Team	P
11	(Latvia) Martins Sesks	(Latvia) Renars Francis	Škoda Fabia Rally2 evo	(India) Team MRF Tyres	(Latvia) Sports Racing Technologies	Driver, Co-driver, Team	MR
12	(New Zealand) Hayden Paddon	(New Zealand) John Kennard	Hyundai i20 N Rally2	(New Zealand) Hayden Paddon	Hyundai New Zealand	Driver, Co-driver, Team	P
14	(Poland) Łukasz Kotarba	(Poland) Tomasz Kotarba	Citroën C3 Rally2	(Poland) BTH Import Stal Rally Team	(Poland) BTH Rally Team	Driver, Co-driver, Team	MI
15	(Estonia) Gregor Jeets	(Estonia) Timo Taniel	Škoda Fabia Rally2 evo	(Estonia) Tehase Auto	(Germany) Toksport WRT	Driver, Co-driver, Team	TBA
16	(Lithuania) Vaidotas Zala	(Austria) Ilka Minor	Škoda Fabia Rally2 evo	(Lithuania) Teltonika Racing	(Latvia) Sports Racing Technologies	Driver, Co-driver, Team	TBA
17	(Lithuania) Vladas Jurkevicius	(Lithuania) Aisvydas Paliukenas	Škoda Fabia Rally2 evo	(Lithuania) Vladas Jurkevicius	(Latvia) Sports Racing Technologies	Driver, Co-driver, Team	P
18	(Estonia) Priit Koik	(Estonia) Kristo Tamm	Ford Fiesta Rally2	(Estonia) OT Racing	(Estonia) OT Racing	Driver, Co-driver, Team	TBA
19	(Finland) Mikko Heikkila	(Finland) Samu Vaaleri	Škoda Fabia Rally2 evo	(Finland) Mikko Heikkila	(Finland) TGS Worldwide OU	Driver, Co-driver, Team	TBA
20	(Australia) Luke Anear	(Australia) Andrew Sarandis	Ford Fiesta Rally2	(Australia) Luke Anear	(Australia) Luke Anear	Driver, Co-driver, Team	P
Rally3 ERC & ERC3 entries
21	(Poland) Igor Widłak	(Poland) Daniel Dymurski	Ford Fiesta Rally3	(Poland) KG-RT	(Poland) Vacat Service&Motorsport	Driver, Co-driver, Team, ERC 3	MR
22	(Estonia) Kaspar Kasari	(Estonia) Rainis Raidma	Ford Fiesta Rally3	(Estonia) OT Racing	(Estonia) OT Racing	Driver, Co-driver, Team, ERC 3	TBA
Rally4 ERC and ERC4 entries
23	(France) Laurent Pellier	(France) Marine Pelamourgues	Opel Corsa Rally4	(Germany) ADAC Opel Rallye Junior Team	(Austria) Stohl Racing	Driver, Co-driver, Team, ERC 4, ERC 4 Junior	P
24	(Spain) Oscar Palomo Ortiz	(Spain) Xavi Moreno	Peugeot 208 Rally4	Rallye Team Spain	(Spain) Mavisa Sport	Driver, Co-driver, Team, ERC 4, ERC 4 Junior	P
25	(Hungary) Martin Laszlo	(Hungary) David Berendi	Renault Clio Rally4	(Hungary) M-Sport Racing Kft.	(Hungary) Topp-Cars Rally Team	Driver, Co-driver, Team, ERC 4, ERC 4 Junior	P
26	(Italy) Andrea Mabellini	(Italy) Virginia Lenzi	Renault Clio Rally4	(Germany) Toksport WRT	(Germany) Toksport WRT	Driver, Co-driver, Team, ERC 4, ERC 4 Junior	P
27	(Finland) Toni Herranen	(Finland) Mikko Lukka	Ford Fiesta Rally4	(Finland) Toni Herranen	(Finland) KMS Racing	Driver, Co-driver, Team, ERC 4, ERC 4 Junior	P
28	(Sweden) Victor Hansen	(Sweden) Victor Johansson	Ford Fiesta Rally4	(Sweden) Victor Hansen	(Sweden) Victor Hansen	Driver, Co-driver, Team, ERC 4, ERC 4 Junior	P
29	(Andorra) Alex Espanol	(Spain) Jose Murado	Peugeot 208 Rally4	(Andorra) ACA eSport	(Spain) GC Motorsport	Driver, Co-driver, Team, ERC 4, ERC 4 Junior	P
30	(Lithuania) Justas Simaska	(Lithuania) Giedrius Nomeika	Ford Fiesta Rally4	(Lithuania) Mazeikiu Auto Sporto Klubas	(Lithuania) Simaska Motorsport	Driver, Co-driver, Team, ERC 4, ERC 4 Junior	P
31	(Italy) Roberto Dapra	(Italy) Luca Guglielmetti	Ford Fiesta Rally4	(Italy) Roberto Dapra	(Italy) JME Rally Team	Driver, Co-driver, Team, ERC 4, ERC 4 Junior	P
32	(Czech Republic) Daniel Polasek	(Czech Republic) Katerina Janovska	Ford Fiesta Rally4	(Czech Republic) Yacco ACCR Team	(Czech Republic) Orsak Rally Sport	Driver, Co-driver, Team, ERC 4, ERC 4 Junior	P
33	(Estonia) Joosep Ralf Nogene	(Estonia) Aleks Lesk	Ford Fiesta Rally4	CKR Estonia	(Estonia) Joosep Ralf Nogene	Driver, Co-driver, Team, ERC 4, ERC 4 Junior	P
34	(Italy) Mattia Vita	(Italy) Massimiliano Bosi	Ford Fiesta Rally4	(Italy) Mattia Vita	(Italy) G.B. Motors Racing	Driver, Co-driver, Team, ERC 4, ERC 4 Junior	P
35	(Sweden) Isak Reiersen	(Sweden) Lucas Karlsson	Ford Fiesta Rally4	(Sweden) Isak Reiersen	(Sweden) Isak Reiersen Motorsport	Driver, Co-driver, Team, ERC 4, ERC 4 Junior	P
36	(France) Anthony Fotia	(France) Arnaud Dunand	Renault Clio Rally4	(France) Toksport WRT	(France) Toksport WRT	Driver, Co-driver, Team, ERC 4	MI
37	(Austria) Luca Waldherr	(Austria) Claudia Meier	Opel Corsa Rally4	(Germany) ADAC Opel Rallye Junior Team	(Austria) Waldherr Motorsport	Driver, Co-driver, Team, ERC 4	TBA
38	(Estonia) Karl-Markus Sei	(Estonia) Martin Leotoots	Ford Fiesta Rally4	(Estonia) ALM Motorsport	(Estonia) SK Sport MTU	Driver, Co-driver, Team, ERC 4	TBA
39	(Finland) Benjamin Korhola	(Finland) Pekka Kelander	Ford Fiesta Rally4	(Finland) Benjamin Korhola	(Finland) Benjamin Korhola Racing	Driver, Co-driver, Team, ERC 4, ERC 4 Junior	TBA
Rally5 ERC and ERC4 Entries
40	(Argentina) Paulo Soria	(Argentina) Marcelo Der Ohanessian	Renault Clio Rally5	(Argentina) Paulo Soria	(Germany) Toksport WRT	Driver, Co-driver, Team, ERC 4, Clio Trophy by Toksport WRT	MI
41	(Italy) Giorgio Cogni	(Italy) Gabriele Zanni	Renault Clio Rally5	(Italy) Giorgio Cogni	(Germany) Toksport WRT	Driver, Co-driver, Team, ERC 4, Clio Trophy by Toksport WRT	MI
42	(Spain) Sergio Fuentes	(Spain) Alain Peña	Renault Clio Rally5	(Spain) Sergio Fuentes	(Germany) Toksport WRT	Driver, Co-driver, Team, ERC 4, Clio Trophy by Toksport WRT	MI
43	(Turkey) Emre Hasbay	(Turkey) Onur Vatansever	Renault Clio Rally5	(Turkey) Emre Hasbay	(Germany) Toksport WRT	Driver, Co-driver, Team, ERC 4, Clio Trophy by Toksport WRT	MI
44	(Italy) Andrea Mazzocchi	(Italy) Silvia Gallotti	Renault Clio Rally5	(Italy) Andrea Mazzocchi	(Germany) Toksport WRT	Driver, Co-driver, Team, ERC 4, Clio Trophy by Toksport WRT	MI
45	(Hungary) Patrik Herczig	(Hungary) Kristof Varga	Renault Clio Rally5	(Hungary) Herczig ASE	(Germany) Toksport WRT	Driver, Co-driver, Team, ERC 4, Clio Trophy by Toksport WRT	MI
46	(France) Ghjuvanni Rossi	(France) Dominique Cervi	Renault Clio Rally5	(France) Ghjuvanni Rossi	(Germany) Toksport WRT	Driver, Co-driver, Team, ERC 4, Clio Trophy by Toksport WRT	MI
