= 2022 Rally Poland =

78th edition of Rally Poland

2022 Rally Poland: 78. ORLEN Rajd Polski - Rally Poland 2022
Round 4 of 8 in the 2022 European Rally Championship
← Previous event	Next event →
- Host country: Poland
- Rally base: Mikołajki, Warmian-Masurian Voivodeship
- Dates run: 10 – 12 June 2022
- Start location: Krzywe, Warmian-Masurian Voivodeship
- Finish location: Miłki, Warmian-Masurian Voivodeship
- Stages: 14 (188.10 km; 116.88 miles)
- Stage surface: Gravel
- Transport distance: 664.23 km (412.73 miles)
- Overall distance: 852.33 km (529.61 miles)

Statistics
- Crews registered: 76
- Crews: 76 at start, 57 at finish

Overall results
- Overall winner: (Poland) Mikołaj Marczyk (Poland) Szymon Gospodarczyk (Poland) Orlen Team; 1:38:05.4
- Power Stage winner: (Lithuania) Vaidotas Žala (Austria) Ilka Minor (Lithuania) Teltonika Racing; 5:23.4

The 2022 Rally Poland (also known as the ORLEN Rajd Polski - Rally Poland 2022) was a motor racing event for rally cars held from 10 June to 12 June 2022. It was the 78th edition of the Rally Poland. The event was the fourth round of the 2022 European Rally Championship. The event was based in Mikołajki and was contested over fourteen special stages covering a total competitive distance of 188.10 km (116.88 mi).

Alexey Lukyanuk and Alexey Arnautov were the defending rally winners. Javier Pardo and Adrián Pérez were the defending winners in the ERC-2 category. Sami Pajari and Enni Mälkönen were the defending rally winners in the ERC-3 category and the ERC-3 Junior category.

Mikołaj Marczyk and Szymon Gospodarczyk won the rally, achieving their first victory in the ERC in their home event. Mārtiņš Sesks and Renars Francis won the ERC Open category. Robert Virves and Julia Thulin took the victory in the ERC-3 category. Laurent Pellier and Marine Pelamourgues won the ERC-4 and Junior ERC categories.

== Background ==
The following crews entered the event competing for points in the European Rally Championship. The event was opened to crews competing in the ERC and its support categories, the Polish Rally Championship and any private crews. Overall of 76 crews entered the event, with 52 crews entering the ERC and 30 entering the Polish Rally Championship.

=== Entry list ===
ERC Entries
No.	Driver	Co-Driver	Entrant	Car	Championship eligibility	Tyre
1	(Spain) Efrén Llarena	(Spain) Sara Fernández	(India) Team MRF Tyres	Škoda Fabia Rally2 evo	Driver, Co-driver, Team	MR
2	(Spain) Nil Solans	(Spain) Marc Martí	(Spain) Nil Solans	Hyundai i20 N Rally2	Driver, Co-driver	P
3	(Poland) Mikołaj Marczyk	(Poland) Szymon Gospodarczyk	(Poland) Orlen Team	Škoda Fabia Rally2 evo	Driver, Co-driver, Team	P
4	(Spain) Javier Pardo	(Spain) Adrián Pérez	(Spain) Javier Pardo	Škoda Fabia Rally2 evo	Driver, Co-driver	MR
5	(Romania) Simone Tempestini	(Romania) Sergiu Itu	(Romania) Simone Tempestini	Škoda Fabia Rally2 evo	Driver, Co-driver	MI
6	(Italy) Simone Campedelli	(Italy) Tania Canton	(India) Team MRF Tyres	Škoda Fabia Rally2 evo	Driver, Co-driver, Team	MR
7	(Italy) Alberto Battistolli	(Italy) Simone Scattolin	(Italy) Alberto Battistolli	Škoda Fabia Rally2 evo	Driver, Co-driver	P
8	(Hungary) Norbert Herczig	(Slovakia) Igor Bacigál	(India) Team MRF Tyres	Škoda Fabia Rally2 evo	Driver, Co-driver, Team	MR
9	(Poland) Grzegorz Grzyb	(Poland) Adam Binięda	(Hungary) Topp-Cars Rally Team	Škoda Fabia Rally2 evo	Driver, Co-driver, Team	P
10	(Czech Republic) Filip Mareš	(Czech Republic) Radovan Bucha	(Czech Republic) Entry Engineering - ATT Investments	Škoda Fabia Rally2 evo	Driver, Co-driver, Team	MI
11	(Sweden) Tom Kristensson	(Sweden) Andreas Johansson	(Czech Republic) Kowax 2BRally Racing	Hyundai i20 R5	Driver, Co-driver, Team	P
12	(Lithuania) Vaidotas Žala	(Austria) Ilka Minor	(Lithuania) Teltonika Racing	Škoda Fabia Rally2 evo	Driver, Co-driver, Team	P
13	(Poland) Radosław Typa	(Poland) Łukasz Sitek	(Poland) GO2NFT Rally Team	Volkswagen Polo GTI R5	Driver, Co-driver, Team	P
15	(Estonia) Ken Torn	(Estonia) Kauri Pannas	(Poland) Plon Rally Team	Ford Fiesta Rally2	Driver, Co-driver, Team	P
16	(Poland) Łukasz Kotarba	(Poland) Tomasz Kotarba	(Poland) BTH Import Stal Rally Team	Citroën C3 Rally2	Driver, Co-driver, Team	MI
17	(Lithuania) Vladas Jurkevičius	(Lithuania) Aisvydas Paliukėnas	(Lithuania) Vladas Jurkevičius	Škoda Fabia Rally2 evo	Driver, Co-driver	P
18	(Estonia) Gregor Jeets	(Estonia) Timo Taniel	(Estonia) Tehase Auto	Škoda Fabia Rally2 evo	Driver, Co-driver, Team	P
19	(Estonia) Priit Koik	(Estonia) Kristo Tamm	(Estonia) OT Racing	Ford Fiesta Rally2	Driver, Co-driver, Team	P
20	(Poland) Maciej Lubiak	(Poland) Grzegorz Dachowski	(Poland) Maciej Lubiak	Škoda Fabia Rally2 evo	Driver, Co-driver	P
21	(Poland) Zbigniew Gabryś	(Poland) Michał Marczewski	(Poland) Zbigniew Gabryś	Škoda Fabia Rally2 evo	Driver, Co-driver	P
22	(Poland) Łukasz Byśkiniewicz	(Poland) Daniel Siatkowski	(Poland) APR Motorsport	Hyundai i20 R5	Driver, Co-driver, Team	MI
23	(Poland) Adrian Chwietczuk	(Poland) Damian Syty	(Poland) Adrian Chwietczuk	Škoda Fabia Rally2 evo	Driver, Co-driver	P
24	(Poland) Daniel Chwist	(Poland) Kamil Heller	(Poland) Daniel Chwist	Škoda Fabia Rally2 evo	Driver, Co-driver	P
ERC / ERC Open Entries
14	(Latvia) Mārtiņš Sesks	(Latvia) Renars Francis	(Lithuania) Proracing Rally Team	Škoda Fabia Rally2-Kit	Driver, Co-driver, Team	MR
25	(Andorra) Joan Vinyes	(Spain) Jordi Mercader	(Spain) Suzuki Motor Ibérica	Suzuki Swift R4LLY S	Driver, Co-driver, Team	MI
26	(Spain) Alberto Monarri	(Spain) Carlos Cancela	(Spain) Suzuki Motor Ibérica	Suzuki Swift R4LLY S	Driver, Co-driver, Team	MI
ERC / ERC3 Entries
27	(Poland) Igor Widłak	(Poland) Daniel Dymurski	(Poland) KG-RT	Ford Fiesta Rally3	Driver, Co-driver, Team	MR
28	(Estonia) Kaspar Kasari	(Estonia) Rainis Raidma	(Estonia) OT Racing	Ford Fiesta Rally3	Driver, Co-driver, Team	P
29	(Latvia) Dmitry Feofanov	(Latvia) Normunds Kokins	(Latvia) Dmitry Feofanov	Ford Fiesta Rally3	Driver, Co-driver	P
30	(Estonia) Robert Virves	(Sweden) Julia Thulin	M-Sport Poland	Ford Fiesta Rally3	Driver, Co-driver, Team	P
31	(Kenya) McRae Kimathi	(Kenya) Mwangi Kioni	(Kenya) McRae Kimathi	Ford Fiesta Rally3	Driver, Co-driver	P
ERC / ERC4 Entries
32	(Italy) Andrea Mabellini	(Italy) Virginia Lenzi	(Germany) Toksport WRT	Renault Clio Rally4	Driver, Co-driver, Team, Junior ERC	P
33	(France) Anthony Fotia	(France) Arnaud Dunand	(Germany) Toksport WRT	Renault Clio Rally4	Driver, Co-driver, Team	MI
34	(Spain) Óscar Palomo	(Spain) Xavi Moreno	Rallye Team Spain	Peugeot 208 Rally4	Driver, Co-driver, Team, Junior ERC	P
35	(Argentina) Paulo Soria	(Argentina) Marcelo Der Ohanessian	(Argentina) Paulo Soria	Renault Clio Rally4	Driver, Co-driver	MI
36	(France) Laurent Pellier	(France) Marine Pelamourgues	(Germany) ADAC Opel Rallye Junior Team	Opel Corsa Rally4	Driver, Co-driver, Team, Junior ERC	P
37	(Italy) Roberto Daprà	(Italy) Luca Guglielmetti	(Italy) Roberto Daprà	Ford Fiesta Rally4	Driver, Co-driver, Junior ERC	P
38	(Andorra) Alex Español	(Spain) Rogelio Peñate	(Andorra) ACA eSport	Peugeot 208 Rally4	Driver, Co-driver, Team, Junior ERC	P
39	(Estonia) Joosep Ralf Nõgene	(Estonia) Aleks Lesk	CKR Estonia	Ford Fiesta Rally4	Driver, Co-driver, Team, Junior ERC	P
40	(Germany) Nick Loof	(Portugal) Hugo Magalhães	(Germany) Nick Loof	Ford Fiesta Rally4	Driver, Co-driver, Junior ERC	P
41	(Hungary) Martin László	(Hungary) Dávid Berendi	(Hungary) M-Sport Racing Kft.	Renault Clio Rally4	Driver, Co-driver, Team, Junior ERC	P
42	(Czech Republic) Daniel Polášek	(Czech Republic) Kateřina Janovská	(Czech Republic) Yacco ACCR Team	Ford Fiesta Rally4	Driver, Co-driver, Team, Junior ERC	P
43	(Sweden) Victor Hansen	(Sweden) Victor Johansson	(Sweden) Victor Hansen	Ford Fiesta Rally4	Driver, Co-driver, Junior ERC	P
44	(Poland) Gracjan Predko	(Poland) Adrian Sadowski	(Poland) Gracjan Predko	Peugeot 208 Rally4	Driver, Co-driver, Junior ERC	P
45	(Poland) Tymoteusz Jocz	(Poland) Maciej Judycki	(Poland) Tymoteusz Jocz	Ford Fiesta Rally4	Driver, Co-driver	P
46	(Poland) Adam Sroka	(Poland) Patryk Kielar	(Czech Republic) Kowax 2BRally Racing	Peugeot 208 Rally4	Driver, Co-driver, Team	P
47	(Poland) Marek Nowak	(Poland) Adam Grzelka	(Poland) Marek Nowak	Opel Corsa Rally4	Driver, Co-driver	P
48	(Norway) Ola Nore Jr.	(United Kingdom) Jack Morton	(Norway) Ola Nore Jr.	Ford Fiesta Rally4	Driver, Co-driver, Junior ERC	P
49	(Lithuania) Justaš Simaska	(Lithuania) Giedrius Nomeika	(Lithuania) Mažeikių ASK	Ford Fiesta Rally4	Driver, Co-driver, Team, Junior ERC	P
50	(Finland) Toni Herranen	(Finland) Mikko Lukka	(Finland) Toni Herranen	Ford Fiesta Rally4	Driver, Co-driver, Junior ERC	P
51	(Austria) Luca Waldherr	(Austria) Claudia Maier	(Germany) ADAC Opel Rallye Junior Team	Opel Corsa Rally4	Driver, Co-driver, Team	P
52	(Romania) Norbert Maior	(Romania) Francesca Maria Maior	(Romania) Norbert Maior	Peugeot 208 Rally4	Driver, Co-driver, Junior ERC	P

=== Itinerary ===
All dates and times are CEST (UTC+2).

Date	Time	No.	Stage name	Distance
10 June	12:30	—	Baranowo [Shakedown]	3.46 km
10 June	19:00	SS1	Mikołajki Arena 1	2.50 km
11 June	09:15	SS2	Krzywe 1	15.20 km
11 June	10:10	SS3	Wojnasy 1	12.87 km
11 June	11:00	SS4	Wieliczki 1	24.36 km
11 June	15:10	SS5	Krzywe 2	15.20 km
11 June	16:05	SS6	Wojnasy 2	12.87 km
11 June	16:55	SS7	Wieliczki 2	24.36 km
11 June	19:00	SS8	Mikołajki Arena 2	2.50 km
12 June	08:20	SS9	Mikołajki MAX 1	9.34 km
12 June	09:45	SS10	Świętajno 1	18.61 km
12 June	11:08	SS11	Miłki 1	11.17 km
12 June	12:45	SS12	Mikołajki MAX 2	9.34 km
12 June	14:10	SS13	Świętajno 2	18.61 km
12 June	16:08	SS14	Miłki 2 [Power Stage]	11.17 km

== Report ==
=== ERC Rally2 ===
==== Classification ====
Position		No.	Driver	Co-driver	Entrant	Car	Time	Difference	Points	
Event	Class	No.	Driver	Co-driver	Entrant	Car	Time	Difference	Event	Stage
1	1	3	Mikołaj Marczyk	Szymon Gospodarczyk	Orlen Team	Škoda Fabia Rally2 evo	1:38:05.4	0.0	30	0
2	2	11	Tom Kristensson	Andreas Johansson	Kowax 2BRally Racing	Hyundai i20 R5	1:38:15.4	+10.0	24	2
3	3	15	Ken Torn	Kauri Pannas	Plon Rally Team	Ford Fiesta Rally2	1:38:23.5	+18.1	21	3
4	4	1	Efrén Llarena	Sara Fernández	Team MRF Tyres	Škoda Fabia Rally2 evo	1:38:40.1	+34.7	19	0
5	5	5	Simone Tempestini	Sergiu Itu	Simone Tempestini	Škoda Fabia Rally2 evo	1:38:41.3	+35.9	17	4
6	6	9	Grzegorz Grzyb	Adam Binięda	Topp-Cars Rally Team	Škoda Fabia Rally2 evo	1:39:53.4	+1:48.0	15	0
7	7	10	Filip Mareš	Radovan Bucha	Entry Engineering - ATT Investments	Škoda Fabia Rally2 evo	1:39:55.7	+1:50.3	13	0
8	8	7	Alberto Battistolli	Simone Scattolin	Alberto Battistolli	Škoda Fabia Rally2 evo	1:39:58.6	+1:53.2	11	0
9	9	4	Javier Pardo	Adrián Pérez	Javier Pardo	Škoda Fabia Rally2 evo	1:40:43.8	+2:38.4	9	0
10	10	8	Norbert Herczig	Igor Bacigál	Team MRF Tyres	Škoda Fabia Rally2 evo	1:40:56.7	+2:51.3	7	0
11	11	18	Gregor Jeets	Timo Taniel	Tehase Auto	Škoda Fabia Rally2 evo	1:41:10.4	+3:05.0	5	1
12	12	23	Adrian Chwietczuk	Damian Syty	Adrian Chwietczuk	Škoda Fabia Rally2 evo	1:41:15.7	+3:10.3	4	0
14	13	20	Maciej Lubiak	Grzegorz Dachowski	Maciej Lubiak	Škoda Fabia Rally2 evo	1:42:18.6	+4:13.2	2	0
15	14	16	Łukasz Kotarba	Tomasz Kotarba	BTH Import Stal Rally Team	Citroën C3 Rally2	1:42:22.2	+4:16.8	1	0
16	15	19	Priit Koik	Kristo Tamm	OT Racing	Ford Fiesta Rally2	1:42:24.4	+4:19.0	0	0
18	16	24	Daniel Chwist	Kamil Heller	Daniel Chwist	Škoda Fabia Rally2 evo	1:46:42.2	+8:36.8	0	0
34	17	12	Vaidotas Žala	Ilka Minor	Teltonika Racing	Škoda Fabia Rally2 evo	1:58:51.9	+20:46.5	0	5
35	18	6	Simone Campedelli	Tania Canton	Team MRF Tyres	Škoda Fabia Rally2 evo	2:09:05.7	+31:00.3	0	0
39	19	17	Vladas Jurkevičius	Aisvydas Paliukėnas	Vladas Jurkevičius	Škoda Fabia Rally2 evo	2:49:15.1	+1:11:09.7	0	0
Retired SS12		22	Łukasz Byśkiniewicz	Daniel Siatkowski	APRMotorsport	Hyundai i20 R5	Accident		0	0
Retired SS8		2	Nil Solans	Marc Martí	Nil Solans	Hyundai i20 N Rally2	Suspension		0	0
Retired SS7		21	Zbigniew Gabryś	Michał Marczewski	Zbigniew Gabryś	Škoda Fabia Rally2 evo	Cooling		0	0
Retired SS6		13	Radosław Typa	Łukasz Sitek	GO2NFT Rally Team	Volkswagen Polo GTI R5	Rolled		0	0

==== Special stages ====
Stage	Winners	Car	Time	Class leaders
SD	Battistolli / Scattolin	Škoda Fabia Rally2 evo	2:02.2	—N/a
QS	Solans / Martí	Hyundai i20 N Rally2	1:59.8	—N/a
SS1	Solans / Martí	Hyundai i20 N Rally2	1:49.7	Solans / Martí
SS2	Marczyk / Gospodarczyk	Škoda Fabia Rally2 evo	7:54.7	Solans / Martí
SS3	Marczyk / Gospodarczyk	Škoda Fabia Rally2 evo	6:13.7	Solans / Martí; Marczyk / Gospodarczyk
SS4	Solans / Martí	Hyundai i20 N Rally2	11:54.8	Solans / Martí
SS5	Marczyk / Gospodarczyk	Škoda Fabia Rally2 evo	7:51.7	Solans / Martí
SS6	Solans / Martí	Hyundai i20 N Rally2	6:08.3	Solans / Martí
SS7	Marczyk / Gospodarczyk	Škoda Fabia Rally2 evo	11:50.7	Marczyk / Gospodarczyk
SS8	Marczyk / Gospodarczyk	Škoda Fabia Rally2 evo	1:46.7	Marczyk / Gospodarczyk
SS9	Llarena / Fernández; Marczyk / Gospodarczyk	Škoda Fabia Rally2 evo Škoda Fabia Rally2 evo	5:17.7	Marczyk / Gospodarczyk
SS10	Kristensson / Johansson	Hyundai i20 R5	10:20.1	Marczyk / Gospodarczyk
SS11	Žala / Minor	Škoda Fabia Rally2 evo	5:31.1	Marczyk / Gospodarczyk
SS12	Torn / Pannas	Ford Fiesta Rally2	5:18.4	Marczyk / Gospodarczyk
SS13	Kristensson / Johansson	Hyundai i20 R5	10:16.7	Marczyk / Gospodarczyk
SS14	Žala / Minor	Škoda Fabia Rally2 evo	5:23.4	Marczyk / Gospodarczyk

==== Championship standings ====
Pos.	Drivers' championship			Co-drivers' championship			Teams' championship		
Pos.	Move	Driver	Points	Move	Co-driver	Points	Move	Manufacturer	Points
1		Efrén Llarena	89		Sara Fernández	89	1	Team MRF Tyres	147
2		Nil Solans	65		Marc Martí	65	1	Toksport WRT	123
3	1	Simone Tempestini	55	1	Sergiu Itu	55		Rallye Team Spain	103
4	1	Armindo Araújo	45	1	Luís Ramalho	45	4	ADAC Opel Rallye Junior Team	77
5		Javier Pardo	44		Adrián Pérez	44		Team Hyundai Portugal	59

=== ERC Open ===
==== Classification ====
Position		No.	Driver	Co-driver	Entrant	Car	Time	Difference	Points		
Event	Class	No.	Driver	Co-driver	Entrant	Car	Time	Difference	Class	Stage	Event
17	1	14	Mārtiņš Sesks	Renars Francis	Proracing Rally Team	Škoda Fabia Rally2-Kit	1:42:40.0	0.0	30	0	0
21	2	25	Joan Vinyes	Jordi Mercader	Suzuki Motor Ibérica	Suzuki Swift R4LLY S	1:47:57.7	+5:17.7	24	0	0
33	3	26	Alberto Monarri	Carlos Cancela	Suzuki Motor Ibérica	Suzuki Swift R4LLY S	1:56:58.8	+14:18.8	21	0	0

==== Special stages ====
Stage	Winners	Car	Time	Class leaders
SD	Sesks / Francis	Škoda Fabia Rally2-Kit	2:09.4	—N/a
SS1	Vinyes / Mercader	Suzuki Swift R4LLY S	1:57.6	Vinyes / Mercader
SS2	Sesks / Francis	Škoda Fabia Rally2-Kit	8:30.5	Sesks / Francis
SS3	Sesks / Francis	Škoda Fabia Rally2-Kit	6:42.1	Sesks / Francis
SS4	Sesks / Francis	Škoda Fabia Rally2-Kit	12:57.2	Sesks / Francis
SS5	Sesks / Francis	Škoda Fabia Rally2-Kit	8:12.8	Sesks / Francis
SS6	Sesks / Francis	Škoda Fabia Rally2-Kit	6:23.4	Sesks / Francis
SS7	Sesks / Francis	Škoda Fabia Rally2-Kit	12:18.2	Sesks / Francis
SS8	Vinyes / Mercader	Suzuki Swift R4LLY S	1:51.7	Sesks / Francis
SS9	Sesks / Francis	Škoda Fabia Rally2-Kit	5:32.2	Sesks / Francis
SS10	Sesks / Francis	Škoda Fabia Rally2-Kit	10:43.9	Sesks / Francis
SS11	Sesks / Francis	Škoda Fabia Rally2-Kit	5:43.0	Sesks / Francis
SS12	Sesks / Francis	Škoda Fabia Rally2-Kit	5:32.2	Sesks / Francis
SS13	Sesks / Francis	Škoda Fabia Rally2-Kit	10:36.5	Sesks / Francis
SS14	Sesks / Francis	Škoda Fabia Rally2-Kit	5:36.8	Sesks / Francis

==== Championship standings ====
Pos.	Drivers' championship			Co-drivers' championship		
Pos.	Move	Driver	Points	Move	Co-driver	Points
1		Joan Vinyes	108		Carlos Cancela	90
2		Alberto Monarri	90		Jordi Mercader	78
3		Mārtiņš Sesks	60	1	Renars Francis	60
4				1	Claudi Ribeiro	30
