= 2022 European Rally Championship =

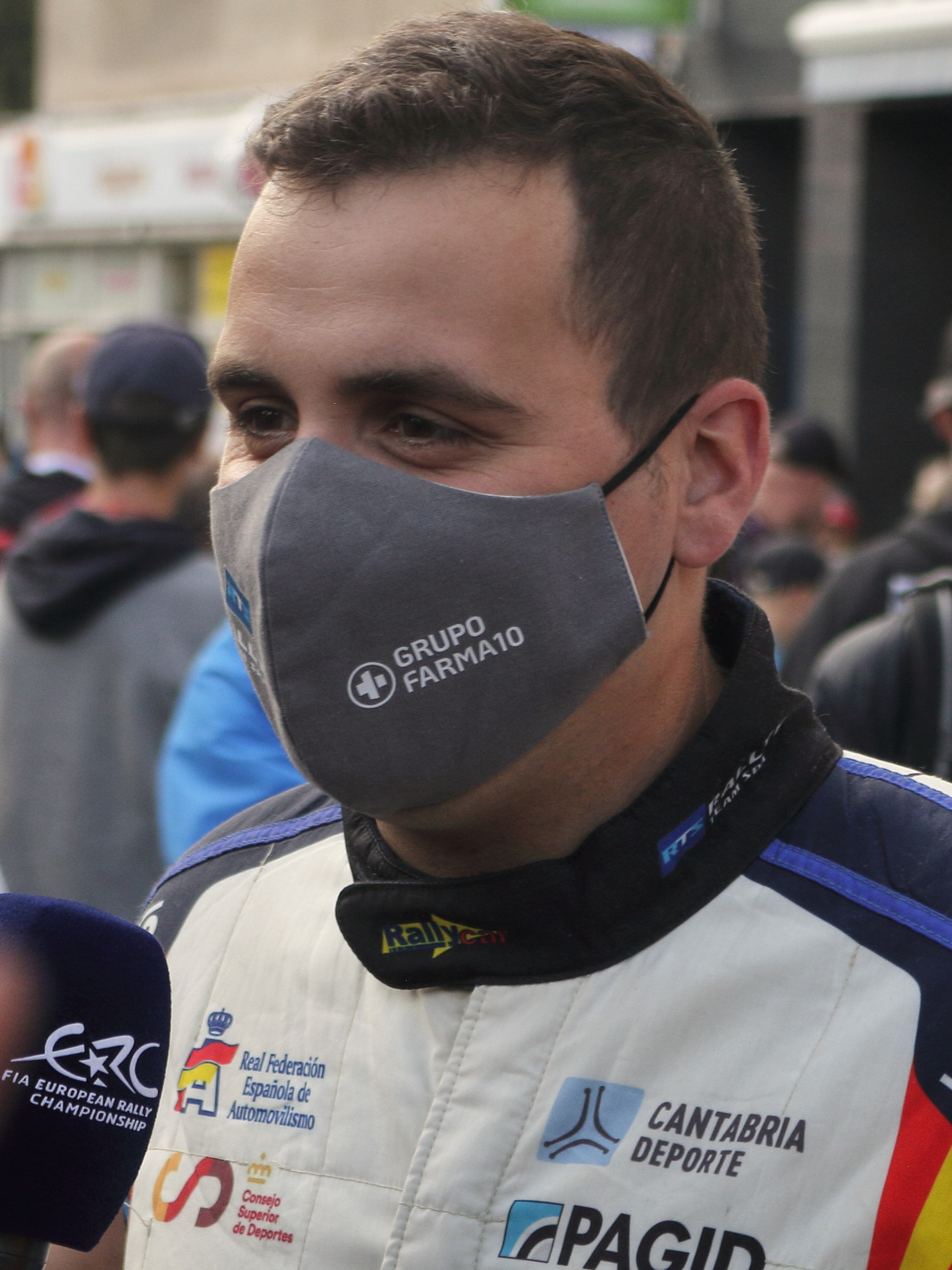
Efrén Llarena won the ERC drivers' championship.

The 2022 European Rally Championship was the 70th season of the FIA European Rally Championship, the European continental championship series in rallying. The season was also the ninth following the merge between the European Rally Championship and the Intercontinental Rally Challenge.

Andreas Mikkelsen was the reigning champion. Javier Pardo Siota was the reigning champion of ERC 2, now renamed as ERC Open, while Jean-Baptiste Franceschi was the reigning champion of ERC 3 - now renamed as ERC 4.

Efrén Llarena won the championship before 2022 Barum Czech Rally Zlín, using a Ŝkoda Fabia Rally2 evo prepared by Team MRF Tyres.

== Competitions ==
- FIA ERC: Main open championship for all current FIA-homologated cars within sporting classes RC2 to RC5, with Rally2 cars the leading contenders.
- FIA ERC3: Second tier, specifically for the Rally3 class.
- FIA ERC4: Third ERC tier, the first for front-wheel-drive cars. Allows Rally4, Rally5, R3 (Group R) and Group A cars.
- FIA ERC4 Junior: For drivers aged 27 and under on 1 January 2022 in Rally4 and Rally5 cars on Pirelli control tyres. Also called 'ERC Junior' by the promotor, this championship will not be contested over the first two rounds.
- FIA European Rally Championship for Teams: each team can nominate a maximum of three cars (from all categories), counting the two highest-placed cars from each team.
- ERC Open: for the cars formerly used in ERC-2, including N4, Rally2-Kit and RGT classes. This championship is organised by ERC Promotor Gmbh and is not an official FIA title, therefore entry into either ERC or ERC Open does not expressively qualify for entry into the other, unlike ERC3 or ERC4 for example.
- Clio Trophy by Toksport WRT: competition with six rounds of the ERC with Renault Clio Rally5 as the vehicle of choice. The winner receives the ability to contest 3 events from ERC 2023 season behind the wheel of a Renault Clio Rally4.

== Calendar ==
The 2022 season is set to contested over eight rounds across Central, Northern and Southern Europe.

Round	Start date	Finish date	Rally	Rally headquarters	Surface	Stages	Distance	Ref.
1	11 March	12 March	(Portugal) Rally Serras de Fafe e Felgueiras	Fafe, Braga	Gravel	17	196.21 km	
2	25 March	27 March	(Portugal) Azores Rallye	Ponta Delgada, Azores	Gravel	13	192.86 km	
3	12 May	14 May	(Spain) Rally Islas Canarias	Las Palmas, Canary Islands	Tarmac	13	194.04 km	
4	11 June	12 June	Rally Poland	Mikołajki, Warmia-Masuria	Gravel	14	188.10 km	
5	2 July	3 July	(Latvia) Rally Liepāja	Liepāja, Liepāja	Gravel	12	181.28 km	
6	23 July	24 July	(Italy) Rally di Roma Capitale	Fiuggi, Lazio	Tarmac	13	187.14 km	
7	27 August	28 August	(Czech Republic) Barum Czech Rally Zlín	Zlín, Zlín Region	Tarmac	13	202.57 km	
8	20 October	22 October	(Spain) RallyRACC Catalunya-Costa Daurada	Salou, Catalonia	Tarmac	14	235.52 km	

== Entries ==
=== ERC ===
Rally2 ERC Entries
Entrant / Team (Note: Team Entrants are eligible for points in ERC Teams Championship)	Driver	Co-Driver	Car / Car Running Team (Note: Team employed by the Entrant to either provide or service the car, not eligible for points in ERC Championship for Teams. Verified by eWRC-Results.com or referenced inline.)		Tyre	Rounds
(Czech Republic) Agrotec Skoda Rally Team	(Czech Republic) Jan Kopecký	(Czech Republic) Jan Hlousek	Škoda Fabia Rally2 evo	(Czech Republic) Kopeckŷ Motorsport	P	7
(Estonia) ALM Motorsport	(Estonia) Georg Linnamäe	(United Kingdom) James Morgan	Volkswagen Polo GTI R5	(Estonia) ALM Motorsport	P	1
(Poland) APR Motorsport	(Poland) Łukasz Byśkiniewicz	(Poland) Daniel Siatkowski	Hyundai i20 R5	(Poland) APR Motorsport	M	4
(Austria) BRR Baumschlager Rallye & Racing Team	(Germany) Albert von Thurn und Taxis	(Austria) Bernhard Ettel	Škoda Fabia Rally2 evo	(Austria) BRR Baumschlager Rallye & Racing Team	P	6-7
(Poland) BTH Import Stal Rally Team	(Poland) Łukasz Kotarba	(Poland) Tomasz Kotarba	Citroën C3 Rally2	(Poland) BTH Rally Team	M	1–6
(Spain) Canarias Sport Club	(Spain) Luis Monzón	(Spain) José Carlos Déniz	Škoda Fabia Rally2 evo	(Spain) Luis Monzón	P	3
(Portugal) Citroën Vodafone Team	(Portugal) José Pedro Fontes	(Portugal) Inês Ponte	Citroën C3 Rally2	(Portugal) Sports & You	P	1–2
(Spain) Copi Sport	(Spain) Enrique Cruz	(Spain) Yeray Mujica Eugenio	Ford Fiesta Rally2	(Spain) Copi Sport Rally Team	M	3
(Czech Republic) Entry Engineering - ATT Investments	(Czech Republic) Filip Mareš	(Czech Republic) Radovan Bucha	Škoda Fabia Rally2 evo	(Czech Republic) Entry Engineering	M	4, 6-7
(Spain) Escudería Milesocasiones.com	(Mexico) Ricardo Triviño	(Spain) Vicente Salom	Škoda Fabia Rally2 evo	(Mexico) Ricardo Triviño	P	1
(Spain) Escudería Mollerussa	(Spain) José Luis García	(Spain) José Murado	Škoda Fabia R5	(Spain) Juan José Abia	M	1, 6
(Spain) Escudería Mollerussa	(Spain) José Luis García	(Spain) Alberto Chamorro	Škoda Fabia R5	(Spain) Juan José Abia	M	3
Eurosol Racing Team Hungary	(Austria) Simon Wagner	(Austria) Gerald Winter	Škoda Fabia Rally2 evo	Eurosol Racing Team Hungary	M	2-3, 7
Eurosol Racing Team Hungary	(Austria) Simon Wagner	(Slovenia) Pia Sumer	Škoda Fabia Rally2 evo	Eurosol Racing Team Hungary	M	5
(Italy) F.P.F. Sport	(Italy) Andrea Crugnola	(Italy) Pietro Ometto	Citroën C3 Rally2	(Italy) F.P.F. Sport	P	6
Go2NFT Rally Team	(Poland) Radosław Typa	(Poland) Łukasz Sitek	Volkswagen Polo GTI R5	(Poland) Rallytechnology	P	4
(Italy) Hyundai Rally Team Italia	(Italy) Giandomenico Basso	(Italy) Lorenzo Granai	Hyundai i20 N Rally2	(Italy) Friulmotor	P	6
(Czech Republic) Kowax 2BRally Racing	(Sweden) Tom Kristensson	(Sweden) Andreas Johansson	Hyundai i20 R5	(Czech Republic) Martin Vlček Kowax Racing	P	4-5, 7
(Czech Republic) Kowax 2BRally Racing	(Czech Republic) Martin Vlcek	(Czech Republic) Alexandra Skripova	Hyundai i20 R5	(Czech Republic) Martin Vlček Kowax Racing	M	7
(Poland) Orlen Team	(Poland) Miko Marczyk	(Poland) Szymon Gospodarczyk	Škoda Fabia Rally2 evo	(Latvia) Sports Racing Technologies	P	4
(Estonia) OT Racing	(Estonia) Priit Koik	(Estonia) Kristo Tamm	Ford Fiesta Rally2	(Estonia) OT Racing	P	4-5
(Portugal) Play Racing	(Portugal) Pedro Câmara	(Portugal) João Câmara	Citroën C3 Rally2	(Portugal) Sports & You	P	2
(Poland) Plon Rally Team	(Estonia) Ken Torn	(Estonia) Kauri Pannas	Ford Fiesta Rally2	(Poland) Jarosław Kołtun	P	1–2, 4, 7
(Poland) Plon Rally Team	(Estonia) Ken Torn	(Estonia) Andrus Toom	Ford Fiesta Rally2	(Poland) Jarosław Kołtun	P	5
(Poland) Plon Rally Team	(Estonia) Ken Torn	(Estonia) Ken Järveoja	Ford Fiesta Rally2	(Poland) Jarosław Kołtun	P	6
Rallye Team Spain	(Spain) Nil Solans	(Spain) Marc Martí	Volkswagen Polo GTI R5	(Spain) Francisco Dorado Vizcaíno	P	1
(Spain) Revys Motorsport	(Spain) Miguel Ángel Suárez	(Spain) Eduardo González Delgado	Citroën C3 Rally2	(Spain) Sports & You Canarias	P	3
(Czech Republic) Samohyl Skoda Team	(Czech Republic) Adam Brezik	(Czech Republic) Ondrej Krajca	Škoda Fabia R5	(Czech Republic) Vancik Motorsport	M	7
Team Hyundai Portugal	(Portugal) Bruno Magalhães	(Portugal) Carlos Magalhães	Hyundai i20 N Rally2	(Portugal) Sports & You	M	1–2
Team Hyundai Portugal	(Portugal) Ricardo Teodósio	(Portugal) José Teixeira	Hyundai i20 N Rally2	(Germany) Hyundai Motorsport	P	1–2
(India) Team MRF Tyres	(Spain) Efrén Llarena	(Spain) Sara Fernández	Škoda Fabia Rally2 evo	(Spain) Race Seven	M	All
(India) Team MRF Tyres	(Hungary) Norbert Herczig	(Slovakia) Igor Bacigál	Škoda Fabia Rally2 evo	Eurosol Racing Team Hungary	M	1–4
(India) Team MRF Tyres	(Hungary) Norbert Herczig	(Hungary) Janos Czako	Škoda Fabia Rally2 evo	Eurosol Racing Team Hungary	M	6
(India) Team MRF Tyres	(Hungary) Norbert Herczig	(Hungary) Ramon Ferencz	Škoda Fabia Rally2 evo	Eurosol Racing Team Hungary	M	7
(India) Team MRF Tyres	(Italy) Simone Campedelli	(Italy) Tania Canton	Škoda Fabia Rally2 evo	(Italy) Step Five Motorsport	M	1–4, 6-7
(India) Team MRF Tyres	(Spain) Javier Pardo	(Spain) Adrian Perez	Škoda Fabia Rally2 evo	(Spain) Race Seven	M	5-8
(India) Team MRF Tyres	(Latvia) Martins Sesks	(Latvia) Renars Francis	Škoda Fabia Rally2 evo	(Latvia) Sports Racing Technologies	M	5-6
(Estonia) Tehase Auto	(Estonia) Gregor Jeets	(Estonia) Timo Taniel	Škoda Fabia Rally2 evo	(Estonia) Tehase Auto OÜ	P	4-5
Teltonika Racing	(Lithuania) Vaidotas Žala	(Austria) Ilka Minor	Škoda Fabia Rally2 evo	(Latvia) Sports Racing Technologies	P	4-5
~~(Germany) Toksport WRT~~	~~(Latvia) Nikolay Gryazin~~	~~(Latvia) Konstantin Aleksandrov~~				1*
(Hungary) Topp-Cars Rally Team	(Poland) Grzegorz Grzyb	(Poland) Kamil Kozdroń	Škoda Fabia Rally2 evo	(Hungary) Topp-Cars Rally Team	P	3
(Hungary) Topp-Cars Rally Team	(Poland) Grzegorz Grzyb	(Poland) Adam Binięda	Škoda Fabia Rally2 evo	(Poland) Zbigniew Gabryś	P	4, 6
(Hungary) Topp-Cars Rally Team	(Hungary) Martin Laszlo	(Hungary) David Berendi	Škoda Fabia Rally2 evo	(Hungary) Topp-Cars Rally Team	P	7-8
(Czech Republic) Yacco ACCR Team	(Czech Republic) Erik Cais	(Czech Republic) Petr Těšínský	Ford Fiesta Rally2	(Czech Republic) Orsák Rally Sport	M	1, 7
Entries in Driver's name	Driver	Co-Driver	Car / Car Running Team		Tyre	Rounds
Entries in Driver's name	(Portugal) Pedro Almeida	(Portugal) Mario Castro	Škoda Fabia Rally2 evo	(Portugal) The Racing Factory	P	1–2
Entries in Driver's name	(Italy) Fabio Andolfi	(Italy) Manuel Fenoli	Škoda Fabia Rally2 evo	(Italy) MS Munaretto s.r.l.	M	6
Entries in Driver's name	(Australia) Luke Anear	(Australia) Andrew Sarandis	Ford Fiesta Rally2	(Australia) Luke Anear	P	5
Entries in Driver's name	(Portugal) Armindo Araújo	(Portugal) Luís Ramalho	Škoda Fabia Rally2 evo	(Portugal) The Racing Factory	M	1–2
Entries in Driver's name	(Spain) Josep Bassas	(Spain) Axel Coronado	Škoda Fabia R5	(Portugal) Rafael Botelho	P	1, 3, 5
Entries in Driver's name	(Italy) Alberto Battistolli	(Italy) Simone Scattolin	Škoda Fabia Rally2 evo	(Italy) Krent S.r.l.	P	1–5, 7-8
Entries in Driver's name	(Italy) Alberto Battistolli	(Italy) Danilo Fappani	Škoda Fabia Rally2 evo	(Italy) Krent S.r.l.	P	6
Entries in Driver's name	(France) Yoann Bonato	(France) Benjamin Boulloud	Citroën C3 Rally2	(France) PSA Motorsport	M	3, 5-6, 8
Entries in Driver's name	(Portugal) Miguel Correia	(Portugal) Jorge Carvalho	Škoda Fabia Rally2 evo	(Portugal) ARC Sport	M	1–2
Entries in Driver's name	(Poland) Adrian Chwietczuk	(Poland) Damian Syty	Škoda Fabia Rally2 evo	(Latvia) Sports Racing Technologies	P	4
Entries in Driver's name	(Poland) Daniel Chwist	(Poland) Kamil Heller	Škoda Fabia Rally2 evo	Eurosol Racing Team Hungary	M	3
Entries in Driver's name	(Poland) Daniel Chwist	(Poland) Kamil Heller	Škoda Fabia Rally2 evo	Eurosol Racing Team Hungary	P	4
Entries in Driver's name	(Italy) Tommaso Ciuffi	(Italy) Nicolò Gonella	Škoda Fabia Rally2 evo	(Italy) By Bianchi	M	6
Entries in Driver's name	(Republic of Ireland) Pauric Duffy	(Republic of Ireland) Jeff Case	Hyundai i20 N Rally2	(Republic of Ireland) PCRS Rallysport	P	1
Entries in Driver's name	(Poland) Zbigniew Gabryś	(Poland) Michał Marczewski	Škoda Fabia Rally2 evo	(Poland) Zbigniew Gabryś	P	4
Entries in Driver's name	(Finland) Mikko Heikkila	(Finland) Samu Vaaleri	Škoda Fabia Rally2 evo	(Finland) TGS Worldwide OU	P	5
Entries in Driver's name	(Lithuania) Vladas Jurkevičius	(Lithuania) Aisvydas Paliukėnas	Škoda Fabia Rally2 evo	(Latvia) Sports Racing Technologies	P	4-5
Entries in Driver's name	(Portugal) Pedro Meireles	(Portugal) Pedro Alves	Hyundai i20 N Rally2	(Portugal) Pedro Meireles	P	1
Entries in Driver's name	(Poland) Maciej Lubiak	(Poland) Grzegorz Dachowski	Škoda Fabia Rally2 evo	(Poland) Maciej Lubiak	P	4
Entries in Driver's name	(Portugal) Aloísio Monteiro	(Portugal) Sancho Eiró	Škoda Fabia R5	(Portugal) Rafael Botelho	P	2
Entries in Driver's name	(Portugal) Ricardo Moura	(Portugal) António Costa	Škoda Fabia Rally2 evo	(Portugal) ARC Sport	M	2
Entries in Driver's name	(Brazil) Paulo Nobre	(Brazil) Gabriel Morales	Škoda Fabia R5	(Italy) Motorsport Italia	P	1–2
Entries in Driver's name	(New Zealand) Hayden Paddon	(New Zealand) John Kennard	Hyundai i20 N Rally2	Hyundai New Zealand	P	5
Entries in Driver's name	(Spain) Javier Pardo	(Spain) Adrián Pérez	Škoda Fabia Rally2 evo	(Spain) Race Seven	M	1–3
Entries in Driver's name	(Spain) Javier Pardo	(Spain) Adrián Pérez	Škoda Fabia Rally2 evo	(Spain) Race Seven	M	4
Entries in Driver's name	(Spain) Xavier Pons	(Spain) Alex Haro	Škoda Fabia Rally2 evo	(Spain) Xavier Pons	TBA	8
Entries in Driver's name	(Portugal) Luís Rego	(Portugal) Jorge Henriques	Škoda Fabia Rally2 evo	(Portugal) ARC Sport	M	2
Entries in Driver's name	(Portugal) Rúben Rodrigues	(Portugal) Estevão Rodrigues	Citroën C3 Rally2	(Portugal) PT Racing	M	1–2
Entries in Driver's name	(Italy) Antonio Rusce	(Italy) Giulia Paganoni	Hyundai i20 N Rally2	(Italy) G.B. Motors Racing	P	6
Entries in Driver's name	(Italy) Giacomo Scattolon	(Italy) Giovanni Bernacchini	Škoda Fabia Rally2 evo	(Italy) Erreffe Rally Team	P	6
Entries in Driver's name	(Czech Republic) Petr Semerad	(Czech Republic) Danny Persein	Škoda Fabia Rally2 evo	(Hungary) Topp-Cars Rally Team	M	7
Entries in Driver's name	(Spain) Nil Solans	(Spain) Marc Martí	Volkswagen Polo GTI R5	(Spain) Francisco Dorado Vizcaíno	P	3
Entries in Driver's name	(Spain) Nil Solans	(Spain) Marc Martí	Hyundai i20 N Rally2	(Czech Republic) Martin Vlček Kowax Racing	P	4-6
Entries in Driver's name	(Italy) Rachele Somaschini	(Italy) Nicola Arena	Citroën C3 Rally2	(Italy) RS Team srls	P	1–3, 6
Entries in Driver's name	(Romania) Simone Tempestini	(Romania) Sergiu Itu	Škoda Fabia Rally2 evo	(Czech Republic) Keane Motorsport	M	1, 3–7
Entries in Driver's name	(Romania) Simone Tempestini	(Romania) Sergiu Itu	Škoda Fabia Rally2 evo	(Italy) RB Motorsport	M	2
Entries in Driver's name	(Italy) Damiano De Tommaso	(Italy) Giorgia Ascalone	Škoda Fabia Rally2 evo	(Italy) Delta Rally	P	6
Entries in Driver's name	(Spain) Luis Vilariño	(Spain) Javier Martínez	Škoda Fabia Rally2 evo	(Spain) Luis Vilariño	M	1–2
Entries in Driver's name	Sources: Official rally entry lists: car and tyre information:					

=== ERC Open ===
Rally2-Kit / R4 Entries
Entrant / Team	Driver	Co-Driver	Car / Car Running Team		Tyres	Rounds
(Lithuania) Proracing Rally Team	(Latvia) Mārtiņš Sesks	(Latvia) Renars Francis	Škoda Fabia Rally2-Kit	(Lithuania) ProRacing	P	2
(Lithuania) Proracing Rally Team	(Latvia) Mārtiņš Sesks	(Latvia) Renars Francis	Škoda Fabia Rally2-Kit	(Lithuania) ProRacing	M	4
(Spain) Suzuki Motor Ibérica	(Spain) Alberto Monarri	(Spain) Carlos Cancela	Suzuki Swift R4LLY S	(Spain) Suzuki Motorsport	M	1–4, 6, 8
(Spain) Suzuki Motor Ibérica	(Andorra) Joan Vinyes	(Andorra) Claudi Ribeiro	Suzuki Swift R4LLY S	(Spain) Suzuki Motorsport	M	1
(Spain) Suzuki Motor Ibérica	(Andorra) Joan Vinyes	(Spain) Jordi Mercader	Suzuki Swift R4LLY S	(Spain) Suzuki Motorsport	M	2–4, 6, 8
Sources: Official rally entry lists: Car information:

=== ERC3 ===
Rally3 ERC & ERC3 entries
Entrant / Team	Driver	Co-Driver	Car / Car Running Team		Tyres	Rounds
(Poland) KG-RT	(Poland) Igor Widłak	(Poland) Daniel Dymurski	Ford Fiesta Rally3	(Poland) Vacat Serwis & Motorsport	M	1–2, 4-5, 7
(Poland) KG-RT	(Poland) Igor Widłak	(Poland) Daniel Dymurski	Ford Fiesta Rally3	(Poland) Vacat Serwis & Motorsport	M	3, 6
M-Sport Poland	(Estonia) Robert Virves	(Sweden) Julia Thulin	Ford Fiesta Rally3	M-Sport Poland	P	4
M-Sport Poland	(Estonia) Robert Virves	(Portugal) Hugo Magalhães	Ford Fiesta Rally3	M-Sport Poland	P	6
(Estonia) OT Racing	(Estonia) Kaspar Kasari	(Estonia) Rainis Raidma	Ford Fiesta Rally3	(Estonia) OT Racing	P	1, 4-5
Entries in Driver's name	(United Kingdom) Jon Armstrong	(Republic of Ireland) Brian Hoy	Ford Fiesta Rally3	M-Sport Poland	P	2
Entries in Driver's name	(Latvia) Dmitry Feofanov	(Latvia) Normunds Kokins	Ford Fiesta Rally3	(Italy) ANGI Motorsport	P	1
Entries in Driver's name	(Latvia) Dmitry Feofanov	(Latvia) Normunds Kokins	Ford Fiesta Rally3	(Finland) KMS Racing	P	4
Entries in Driver's name	(Kenya) McRae Kimathi	(Kenya) Mwangi Kioni	Ford Fiesta Rally3	M-Sport Poland	P	4
Entries in Driver's name	(Lebanon) Nassib Nassar	(Lebanon) Rony Maroun	Ford Fiesta Rally3	(Italy) G.B. Motors Racing	P	6
Sources: Official rally entry lists: Car information:

=== ERC4 ===
Rally4 ERC and ERC4 entries
Entrant / Team	Driver	Co-Driver	Car / Car Running Team		Tyre	Rounds	Category
(Andorra) ACA Esport	(Andorra) Alex Español	(Spain) José Murado	Renault Clio Rally4	TBA	P	7	ERC4J
(Andorra) ACA Esport	(Andorra) Alex Español	(Spain) José Murado	Peugeot 208 Rally4	(Spain) GC Motorsport	P	3	ERC4J
(Andorra) ACA Esport	(Andorra) Alex Español	(Spain) José Murado	Peugeot 208 Rally4	(Portugal) EFC Rally Team	P	5	ERC4J
(Andorra) ACA Esport	(Andorra) Alex Español	(Spain) Rogelio Peñate	Peugeot 208 Rally4	(Portugal) EFC Rally Team	P	4, 6	ERC4J
(Germany) ADAC Opel Rally Junior Team	(France) Laurent Pellier	(France) Marine Pelamourgues	Opel Corsa Rally4	(Austria) Stohl Racing	P	3–8	ERC4J
(Germany) ADAC Opel Rally Junior Team	(Austria) Luca Waldherr	(Austria) Claudia Maier	Opel Corsa Rally4	(Austria) Waldherr Motorsport	P	4-5	
(Germany) ADAC Opel Rally Junior Team	(Austria) Fabian Zeiringer	(Austria) Angelika Letz	Opel Corsa Rally4	TBA	P	7	ERC4J
(Estonia) ALM Motorsport	(Estonia) Karl-Markus Sei	(Estonia) Martin Leotoots	Peugeot 208 Rally4	(Estonia) SK Sport MTU	P	5	
CKR Estonia	(Estonia) Joosep Ralf Nõgene	(Estonia) Ken Järveoja	Ford Fiesta Rally4	(Estonia) Joosep Ralf Nõgene	P	1	
CKR Estonia	(Estonia) Joosep Ralf Nõgene	(Estonia) Aleks Lesk	Ford Fiesta Rally4	(Estonia) Joosep Ralf Nõgene	P	4-5	
(Spain) Escuderia Baix Emporda	(Spain) Adria Serratosa Villaseca	(Spain) Eric Bellver	Peugeot 208 Rally4	(Spain)	P	8	
(Spain) Escudería Maspalomas	(Spain) Raúl Hernández Hernández	(Spain) Rodrigo Sanjuan	Peugeot 208 Rally4	(Spain) Sports & You Canarias	P	3	ERC4J
Kowax 2BRally Racing	(Poland) Adam Sroka	(Poland) Patryk Kielar	Peugeot 208 Rally4	(Poland) Rallylab	P	4	
Mazeikiu ASK	(Lithuania) Justas Simaška	(Lithuania) Giedrius Nomeika	Ford Fiesta Rally4	(Lithuania) Simaška Motorsport	P	4-5	ERC4J
Mazeikiu ASK	(Lithuania) Justas Simaška	(Lithuania) Giedrius Nomeika	Peugeot 208 Rally4	(Lithuania) Simaška Motorsport	P	6	ERC4J
M-Sport Poland	(United Kingdom) Jon Armstrong	(Republic of Ireland) Brian Hoy	Ford Fiesta Rally4	M-Sport Poland	P	3	
(Hungary) M-Sport Racing KFT	(Hungary) Martin László	(Hungary) Dávid Berendi	Renault Clio Rally4	(Hungary) Topp-Cars Rally Team	P	3–6	ERC4J
Rallye Team Spain	(Spain) Óscar Palomo	(Spain) Javier Moreno	Peugeot 208 Rally4	(Spain) Mavisa Sport	P	1, 3-6	ERC4J
Rallye Team Spain	(Spain) Óscar Palomo	(Spain) Rodrigo Sanjuan	Peugeot 208 Rally4	(Spain) Mavisa Sport	P	7	ERC4J
Rallye Team Spain	(Spain) Óscar Palomo	(Spain) Angel Luis Vela	Peugeot 208 Rally4	(Spain) Mavisa Sport	P	8	
(Germany) Toksport WRT	(France) Anthony Fotia	(France) Arnaud Dunand	Renault Clio Rally4	(Germany) Toksport WRT	M	1-5	
(Germany) Toksport WRT	(Italy) Andrea Mabellini	(Italy) Virginia Lenzi	Renault Clio Rally4	(Germany) Toksport WRT	M	1–2	ERC4J
(Germany) Toksport WRT	(Italy) Andrea Mabellini	(Italy) Virginia Lenzi	Renault Clio Rally4	(Germany) Toksport WRT	P	3–8	ERC4J
(Hungary) Topp-Cars Rally Team	(Romania) Norbert Maior	(Romania) Francesca Maior	Opel Corsa Rally4	(Spain) Sports & You Canarias	P	3	ERC4J
(Hungary) Topp-Cars Rally Team	(Romania) Norbert Maior	(Romania) Francesca Maior	Peugeot 208 Rally4	(Hungary) Tagai Racing Technology	P	4, 7	ERC4J
(Austria) Team Stengg Motorsport	(Austria) Roland Stengg	(Germany) Anna-Maria Seidl	Opel Corsa Rally4	(Austria) Stengg Motorsport	P	7	
(Spain) VolanFapa	(Spain) Diego Ruiloba	(Spain) Andres Blanco	Peugeot 208 Rally4	(Spain) Terratraining Motorsport	P	8	
(Czech Republic) Yacco ACCR Team	(Czech Republic) Daniel Polášek	(Czech Republic) Kateřina Janovská	Ford Fiesta Rally4	(Czech Republic) Orsák Rally Sport	P	3–7	ERC4J
Entries in Driver's name	Driver	Co-Driver	Car / Car Running Team		Tyre	Rounds	Category
Entries in Driver's name	(Portugal) Ernesto Cunha	(Portugal) Rui Raimundo	Peugeot 208 Rally4	(Portugal) Racing Factory	P	1-2	
Entries in Driver's name	(Italy) Roberto Daprà	(Italy) Luca Guglielmetti	Ford Fiesta Rally4	(Italy) JME Rally Team	P	1–5	ERC4J
Entries in Driver's name	(Italy) Roberto Daprà	(Italy) Luca Guglielmetti	Renault Clio Rally4	(Italy) ATS Motorsport	P	6-8	ERC4J
Entries in Driver's name	(Andorra) Alex Español	(Spain) Rogelio Peñate	Peugeot 208 Rally4	(Portugal) EFC Rally Team	P	6	ERC4J
Entries in Driver's name	(Poland) Iago Gabeiras Fraga	(Poland) Brais Miron	Peugeot 208 Rally4	TBA	P	8	
Entries in Driver's name	(Sweden) Victor Hansen	(Sweden) Victor Johansson	Ford Fiesta Rally4	(Sweden) Victor Hansen	P	3–7	ERC4J
Entries in Driver's name	(Finland) Toni Herranen	(Finland) Mikko Lukka	Ford Fiesta Rally4	(Finland) KMS Racing	P	4-8	ERC4J
Entries in Driver's name	(Poland) Tymoteusz Jocz	(Poland) Maciej Judycki	Ford Fiesta Rally4	(Poland) Tymoteusz Jocz	P	4	
Entries in Driver's name	(Finland) Benjamin Korhola	(Finland) Pekka Kelander	Ford Fiesta Rally4	(Finland) Benjamin Korhola Racing	P	5	
Entries in Driver's name	(Germany) Norman Kreuter	(Germany) Tamara Lutz	Peugeot 208 Rally4	(Germany) Norman Kreuter	M	6	
Entries in Driver's name	(Germany) Norman Kreuter	(Denmark) Jeanette Kvick Andersson	Peugeot 208 Rally4	(Germany) Norman Kreuter	M	7	
Entries in Driver's name	(Germany) Nick Loof	(Portugal) Hugo Magalhães	Ford Fiesta Rally4	M-Sport Poland	P	3–4, 7-8	ERC4J
Entries in Driver's name	(Portugal) Luis Morais	(Portugal) Paulo Silva	Peugeot 208 Rally4	(Portugal) PT Racing	P	8	
Entries in Driver's name	(Austria) René Noller	(Austria) Anne Katharina Stein	Peugeot 208 Rally4		P	3	ERC4J
Entries in Driver's name	(Norway) Ola Nore Jr	(United Kingdom) Jack Morton	Ford Fiesta Rally4	(Norway) Ola Nore Jr	P	3–4	ERC4J
Entries in Driver's name	(Poland) Marek Nowak	(Poland) Adam Grzelka	Opel Corsa Rally4	(Poland) EvoTech	P	4	
Entries in Driver's name	(Poland) Gracjan Predko	(Poland) Adrian Sadowski	Peugeot 208 Rally4	(Poland) Rallylab	P	4	ERC4J
Entries in Driver's name	(Sweden) Isak Reiersen	(Sweden) Lucas Karlsson	Ford Fiesta Rally4	(Sweden) Isak Reiersen Motorsport	P	5	ERC4J
Entries in Driver's name	(Argentina) Paulo Soria	(Argentina) Marcelo Der Ohannesian	Renault Clio Rally4	(Germany) Toksport WRT	M	1, 4	
Entries in Driver's name	(Italy) Mattia Vita	(Italy) Massimiliano Bosi	Ford Fiesta Rally4	(Italy) G.B. Motors Racing	P	3–5	ERC4J
Entries in Driver's name	(Italy) Mattia Vita	(Italy) Sofia D'Ambrosio	Ford Fiesta Rally4	(Italy) G.B. Motors Racing	P	6-7	ERC4J
Rally5 ERC and ERC4 Entries
Entrant / Team	Driver	Co-Driver	Car / Car Running Team		Tyre	Rounds	Category
(Spain) C.D. Todo Sport	(Spain) Sergio Fuentes	(Spain) Alain Peña	Renault Clio Rally5	(Germany) Toksport WRT	M	3, 7	C by T
(Hungary) Herczig Autosport kft.	(Hungary) Patrik Herczig	(Slovakia) Kristof Varga	Renault Clio Rally5	(Germany) Toksport WRT	M	6-7	C by T
Entries in Driver's name	(Italy) Giorgio Cogni	(Italy) Gabriele Zanni	Renault Clio Rally5	(Germany) Toksport WRT	M	2–3, 5-7	C by T
Entries in Driver's name	(Romania) Alexandru Filip	(Romania) Gabriel Lazar	Renault Clio Rally5	(Italy) Gima Autosport	M	6	
Entries in Driver's name	(Spain) Sergio Fuentes	(Spain) Alain Peña	Renault Clio Rally5	(Germany) Toksport WRT	M	2, 5-6	C by T
Entries in Driver's name	(Turkey) Emre Hasbay	(Turkey) Kutay Ertugrul	Renault Clio Rally5	(Germany) Toksport WRT	M	2–3, 5-6	C by T
Entries in Driver's name	(Turkey) Emre Hasbay	(Turkey) Onur Vatansever	Renault Clio Rally5	(Germany) Toksport WRT	M	7	C by T
Entries in Driver's name	(Hungary) Patrik Herczig	(Hungary) Viktor Bán	Renault Clio Rally5	(Germany) Toksport WRT	M	2–3	C by T
Entries in Driver's name	(Hungary) Patrik Herczig	(Slovakia) Kristof Varga	Renault Clio Rally5	(Germany) Toksport WRT	M	5	C by T
Entries in Driver's name	(Germany) Reiner Kuhn	(Germany) Tim Rauber	Renault Clio Rally5	(Germany) Toksport WRT	M	2	C by T
Entries in Driver's name	(Italy) Andrea Mazzocchi	(Italy) Silvia Gallotti	Renault Clio Rally5	(Germany) Toksport WRT	M	2–3, 5-7	C by T
Entries in Driver's name	(Italy) Michael Rendina	(Italy) Mario Pizzuti	Renault Clio Rally5	(Italy) Motorsport Italia	P	6	
Entries in Driver's name	(France) Ghjuvanni Rossi	(France) Maxime Martini	Renault Clio Rally5	(Germany) Toksport WRT	M	2–3	C by T
Entries in Driver's name	(France) Ghjuvanni Rossi	(France) Dominique Corvi	Renault Clio Rally5	(Germany) Toksport WRT	M	5-6	C by T
Entries in Driver's name	(France) Ghjuvanni Rossi	(France) Arnaud Dunand	Renault Clio Rally5	(Germany) Toksport WRT	M	7	C by T
Entries in Driver's name	(Argentina) Paulo Soria	(Argentina) Marcelo Der Ohannesian	Renault Clio Rally5	(Germany) Toksport WRT	M	2–3, 5-7	C by T
Sources: Official rally entry lists: Car information:

== Results and standings ==
=== Season summary ===
Round	Event	Winning driver	Winning co-driver	Winning entrant	Winning time	Report	Ref.
1	(Portugal) Rally Serras de Fafe e Felgueiras	(Spain) Nil Solans	(Spain) Marc Martí	Rallye Team Spain	2:01:14.0		
2	(Portugal) Azores Rallye	(Spain) Efrén Llarena	(Spain) Sara Fernández	(India) Team MRF Tyres	2:24:58.4	Report	
3	(Spain) Rally Islas Canarias	(Spain) Nil Solans	(Spain) Marc Martí	(Spain) Nil Solans	1:58:57.1		
4	Rally Poland	(Poland) Mikołaj Marczyk	(Poland) Szymon Gospodarczyk	(Poland) Orlen Team	1:38:05.4	Report	
5	(Latvia) Rally Liepāja	(Latvia) Mārtiņš Sesks	(Latvia) Renars Francis	(India) Team MRF Tyres	1:31:19.9	Report	
6	(Italy) Rally di Roma Capitale	(Italy) Damiano De Tommaso	(Italy) Giorgia Ascalone	(Italy) Damiano De Tommaso	1:52:37.6		
7	(Czech Republic) Barum Czech Rally Zlín	(Czech Republic) Jan Kopeckŷ	(Czech Republic) Jan Hlousek	(Czech Republic) Agrotec Skoda Rally Team	1:59:27.6		
8	(Spain) RallyRACC Catalunya-Costa Daurada	(France) Yoann Bonato	(France) Benjamin Boulloud	(France) Yoann Bonato	1:56:20.0	Report	

=== Scoring system ===
Points for final position are awarded as in the following table in ERC, ERC3, ERC4 and ERC Open. In ERC, ERC3 and ERC4, the best seven scores from the eight rounds count towards the final number of points.

Position	1st	2nd	3rd	4th	5th	6th	7th	8th	9th	10th	11th	12th	13th	14th	15th
Points	30	24	21	19	17	15	13	11	9	7	5	4	3	2	1

There are also five bonus points awarded to the winners of the Power Stage, four points for second place, three for third, two for fourth and one for fifth. Power Stage points are awarded in the drivers', co-drivers' and manufacturers' championships.

Position	1st	2nd	3rd	4th	5th
Points	5	4	3	2	1

=== Drivers' Championships ===
==== ERC ====
Pos	Driver	PRT1 (Portugal)	PRT2 (Portugal)	ESP1 (Spain)	POL (Poland)	LAT (Latvia)	ITA (Italy)	CZE (Czech Republic)	ESP2 (Spain)	Points	Best 7
1	(Spain) Efrén Llarena	10	1^{1}	2^{2}	4	2^{3}	4^{4}	Ret	2^{1}	166	166
2	(Spain) Javier Pardo	4	13	7	9	8	7^{5}	10	3^{4}	96	96
3	(France) Yoann Bonato			3^{4}		10	3^{3}		1^{2}	88	88
4	(Romania) Simone Tempestini	Ret	4^{2}	8	5^{2}	9	6	WD		79	79
5	(Italy) Simone Campedelli	Ret	7^{5}	5^{5}	35		2	6		71	71
6	(Spain) Nil Solans	1^{4}		1^{3}	Ret	11	WD			70	70
7	(Italy) Alberto Battistolli	5^{3}	9	DSQ	8	7^{2}	Ret	Ret	8^{5}	69	69
8	(Estonia) Ken Torn	27^{1}	Ret		3^{3}	4^{4}	11	Ret		55	55
9	(Hungary) Norbert Herczig	Ret	8	9	10		10	5^{2}		55	55
10	(Austria) Simon Wagner		3^{4}	37^{1}		14		3^{3}		54	54
11	(Portugal) Armindo Araújo	2^{2}	5							45	45
12	(Latvia) Mārtiņš Sesks	NC	10		17	1^{1}	31			42	42
13	(Czech Republic) Filip Mareš				7		23^{1}	2		42	42
14	(Hungary) Martin Laszlo					Ret	Ret	7	4^{31}	35	35
15	(Czech Republic) Jan Kopeckŷ							1^{4}		32	32
16	(Sweden) Tom Kristensson				2^{4}	12		25^{5}		31	31
17	(Poland) Mikołaj Marczyk				1					30	30
17	(Italy) Damiano De Tommaso						1			30	30
19	(Portugal) Bruno Magalhães	6	6							30	30
20	(Portugal) Ricardo Moura		2^{3}							27	27
21	(Poland) Grzegorz Grzyb			Ret	6		8			26	26
22	(Estonia) Gregor Jeets				11^{5}	5^{5}				24	24
23	(France) Laurent Pellier			15	20	36	16	11	5	23	23
24	(Estonia) Georg Linnamäe	3^{5}								22	22
25	(Finland) Mikko Heikkilä					3				21	21
26	(Italy) Andrea Crugnola						5^{2}			21	21
27	(Andorra) Joan Vinyes	13	16	12	21		20		7	20	20
28	(Czech Republic) Erik Cais	Ret						4		19	19
28	(Spain) Enrique Cruz			4						19	19
30	(Portugal) José Pedro Fontes	7	12							17	17
31	(Spain) Alberto Monarri	15	28	39	33		18		6	16	16
32	(Spain) Josep Bassas	Ret		6		29				15	15
33	(New Zealand) Hayden Paddon					6				15	15
34	(Germany) Albert von Thurn und Taxis						12	8		15	15
35	(Czech Republic) Adam Brezik							9^{1}		14	14
36	(Italy) Andrea Mabellini	20	22	17	Ret	25	19	12	9	13	13
37	(Portugal) Ricardo Teodósio	8	Ret							11	11
38	(Portugal) Pedro Almeida	9	19							9	9
39	(Italy) Tommaso Ciuffi						9			9	9
40	(Spain) Óscar Palomo	19		18	24	15	22	13	11	9	9
41	(Poland) Łukasz Kotarba	Ret	26	11	15	Ret	14			8	8
42	(Spain) Miguel Suárez			10						7	7
42	(Italy) Roberto Daprà	22	Ret	23	38	34	21	Ret	10	7	7
44	(Spain) Luis Vilariño	11	18							5	5
45	(Portugal) Miguel Correia	Ret	11							5	5
46	(Lithuania) Vaidotas Žala				34^{1}	Ret				5	5
47	(Finland) Toni Herranen				22	16	37	19	12	4	4
48	(Brazil) Paulo Nobre	12	Ret							4	4
49	(Poland) Adrian Chwietczuk				12					4	4
50	(Estonia) Robert Virves				13		15			4	4
51	(Estonia) Priit Koik				16	13				3	3
52	(Spain) José Luis García	Ret		13			Ret			3	3
53	(Italy) Antonio Rusce						13			3	3
54	(Estonia) Kaspar Kasari	14			19	17				2	2
55	(Italy) Rachele Somaschini	Ret	20	14			17			2	2
56	(Portugal) Luís Rego		14							2	2
57	(Poland) Maciej Lubiak				14					2	2
58	(Czech Republic) Martin Vlcek							14		2	2
59	(Czech Republic) Daniel Polášek			26	32	Ret	Ret	15		1	1
60	(Portugal) Pedro Câmara		15							1	1

Key
Colour	Result
Gold	Winner
Silver	2nd place
Bronze	3rd place
Green	Points finish
Blue	Non-points finish
Blue	Non-classified finish (NC)
Purple	Did not finish (Ret)
Black	Excluded (EX)
Black	Disqualified (DSQ)
White	Did not start (DNS)
White	Cancelled (C)
Blank	Withdrew entry from the event (WD)

==== ERC3 ====
Pos	Driver	PRT1 (Portugal)	PRT2 (Portugal)	ESP1 (Spain)	POL (Poland)	LAT (Latvia)	ITA (Italy)	CZE (Czech Republic)	ESP2 (Spain)	Points	Best 7
1	(Poland) Igor Widłak	3	2	1	4	2	2	1		172	172
2	(Estonia) Kaspar Kasari	1			2	1				84	84
3	(Estonia) Robert Virves				1		1			60	60
4	(Latvia) Dmitry Feofanov	2			3					45	45
5	(United Kingdom) Jon Armstrong		1							30	30
6	(Lebanon) Nassib Nassar						3			21	21

==== ERC4 ====
Pos	Driver	PRT1 (Portugal)	PRT2 (Portugal)	ESP1 (Spain)	POL (Poland)	LAT (Latvia)	ITA (Italy)	CZE (Czech Republic)	ESP2 (Spain)	Points	Best 7
1	(Spain) Óscar Palomo	1		4	3	1	4	3		140	140
2	(Italy) Andrea Mabellini	2	2	3	Ret	9	2	2		126	126
3	(France) Laurent Pellier			1	1	17	1	1		120	120
4	(Argentina) Paulo Soria	3	3	13	Ret	10	7	10		72	72
5	(France) Anthony Fotia	Ret	1	2	Ret	5				71	71
6	(Finland) Toni Herranen				2	2	15	7		62	62
7	(Italy) Roberto Daprà	4	Ret	9	13	15	3	Ret		53	53
8	(Sweden) Victor Hansen			12	6	4	6	Ret		53	53
9	(Italy) Giorgio Cogni		4	15		Ret	9	11		34	34
10	(Andorra) Alex Español			5	Ret	Ret	Ret	5		34	34
11	(Czech Republic) Daniel Polášek			11	10	Ret	Ret	4		31	31
12	(Spain) Sergio Fuentes		5	14		13	10	Ret		29	29
13	(Lithuania) Justas Simaška				5	8	Ret			28	28
14	(Germany) Norman Kreuter						8	6		26	26
15	(Hungary) Martin László			8	8		Ret			22	22
16	(Finland) Benjamin Korhola					3				21	21
17	(Poland) Adam Sroka				4					19	19
18	(Estonia) Joosep Ralf Nõgene	5			14	Ret				19	19
19	(Italy) Andrea Mazzocchi		8	16		11	Ret	14		18	18
20	(Italy) Mattia Vita			21		16	5			17	17
21	(Austria) Luca Waldherr				7	12				17	17
22	(Germany) Nick Loof			7	Ret			13		16	16
23	(Turkey) Emre Hasbay		6	17		Ret	16	Ret		15	15
24	(Spain) Raúl Hernández			6						15	15
25	(Sweden) Isak Reiersen					6				15	15
26	(Hungary) Patrik Herczig		Ret	18		14	12	9		15	15
27	(France) Ghjuvanni Rossi		Ret	19		Ret	13	8		14	14
28	(Portugal) Ernesto Cunha	Ret	7							13	13
29	(Estonia) Karl-Markus Sei					7				13	13
30	(Poland) Gracjan Predko				9					9	9
31	(Germany) René Noller			10						7	7
32	(Poland) Tymoteusz Jocz				11					5	5
33	(Italy) Michael Rendina						11			5	5
34	(Romania) Norbert Maior			Ret	12					4	4
35	(Austria) Fabian Zeiringer							12		4	4
36	(Romania) Alexandru Filip						14			2	2

==== ERC4 Junior ====
Pos	Driver	ESP1 (Spain)	POL (Poland)	LAT (Latvia)	ITA (Italy)	CZE (Czech Republic)	ESP2 (Spain)	Points	Best 5
1	(France) Laurent Pellier	1	1	10	1	1	1	157	150
2	(Spain) Óscar Palomo	3	3	1	4	3	4	131	112
3	(Italy) Andrea Mabellini	2	Ret	7	2	2	2	109	109
4	(Finland) Toni Herranen		2	2	7	6	5	93	93
5	(Italy) Roberto Daprà	8	10	8	3	Ret	3	71	71
6	(Sweden) Victor Hansen	11	5	4	6			56	56
7	(Czech Republic) Daniel Polášek	10	8	Ret	Ret	4		37	37
8	(Andorra) Alex Español	4	Ret	Ret	Ret	5		36	36
9	(Lithuania) Justas Simaška		4	6	Ret			34	34
10	(Italy) Mattia Vita	13		9	5			29	29
11	(Hungary) Martin László	7	6	Ret	Ret			28	28
12	(Germany) Nick Loof	6	Ret			8	Ret	26	26
13	(Finland) Benjamin Korhola			3				21	21
14	(Sweden) Isak Reiersen			5				17	17
14	(Spain) Raúl Hernández	5						17	17
16	(Poland) Gracjan Predko		7					13	13
16	(Austria) Fabian Zeiringer					7		13	13
18	(Romania) Norbert Maior	Ret	9					9	9
18	(Germany) René Noller	9						9	9
20	(Estonia) Joosep Ralf Nõgene		11	Ret				5	5
21	(Norway) Ola Nore Jr	12	Ret					4	4

==== ERC Open ====
Pos	Driver	PRT1 (Portugal)	PRT2 (Portugal)	ESP1 (Spain)	POL (Poland)	LAT (Latvia)	ITA (Italy)	CZE (Czech Republic)	ESP2 (Spain)	Points	Best 6
1	(Andorra) Joan Vinyes	1	2	1	2		2		2	156	156
2	(Spain) Alberto Monarri	2	3	2	3		1		1	150	150
3	(Latvia) Mārtiņš Sesks	NC	1		1					60	60

==== Clio Trophy by Toksport WRT ====
Pos	Driver	PRT2 (Portugal)	ESP (Spain)	LAT (Latvia)	ITA (Italy)	CZE (Czech Republic)	Points
1	(Argentina) Paulo Soria	1	1	1	1	3	130
2	(Italy) Giorgio Cogni	2	3	Ret	2	4	75
3	(Hungary) Patrik Herczig	Ret	6	4	4	2	68
4	(France) Ghjuvanni Rossi	Ret	7	Ret	5	1	66
5	(Spain) Sergio Fuentes	3	2	3	3	Ret	63
6	(Italy) Andrea Mazzocchi	5	4	2	Ret	5	60
7	(Turkey) Emre Hasbay	4	5	Ret	6	Ret	30

=== Co-drivers' championships ===
==== ERC ====
Pos	Driver	PRT1 (Portugal)	PRT2 (Portugal)	ESP1 (Spain)	POL (Poland)	LAT (Latvia)	ITA (Italy)	CZE (Czech Republic)	ESP2 (Spain)	Points	Best 7
1	(Spain) Sara Fernández	10	1^{1}	2^{2}	4	2^{3}	4^{4}	Ret		137	137
2	(Romania) Sergiu Itu	Ret	4^{2}	8	5^{2}	9	6			79	79
3	(Spain) Adrián Pérez	4	13	7	9	8	7^{5}	10		76	76
4	(Switzerland) Tania Canton	Ret	7^{5}	5^{5}	35		2	6		71	71
5	(Spain) Marc Martí	1^{4}		1^{3}	Ret	11	WD			70	70
6	(Italy) Simone Scattolin	5^{3}	9	DSQ	8	7^{2}		Ret		57	57
7	(France) Benjamin Boulloud			3^{4}		10	3^{3}			54	54
8	(Austria) Gerald Winter		3^{4}	37^{1}				33^{3}		52	52
9	(Portugal) Luís Ramalho	2^{2}	5							45	45
10	(Latvia) Renārs Francis	NC	10		17	1^{1}	31			42	42
11	(Czech Republic) Radovan Bucha				7		23^{1}	2		42	42
12	(Czech Republic) Jan Hlousek							1^{4}		32	32
13	(Sweden) Andreas Johansson				2^{4}	12		25^{5}		31	31
14	(Poland) Szymon Gospodarczyk				1					30	30
15	(Italy) Giorgia Ascalone						1			30	30
16	(Portugal) Carlos Magalhães	6	6							30	30
17	(Estonia) Kauri Pannas	27^{1}	Ret		3^{3}			Ret		29	29
18	(Portugal) António Costa		2^{3}							27	27
19	(Slovakia) Igor Bacigál	Ret	8	9	10					27	27
20	(Poland) Adam Binięda				6		8			26	26
21	(Estonia) Timo Taniel				11^{5}	5^{5}				24	24
22	(United Kingdom) James Morgan	3^{5}								22	22
23	(Finland) Samu Vaaleri					3				21	21
24	(Estonia) Andrus Toom					4^{4}				21	21
25	(Italy) Pietro Ometto						5^{2}			21	21
26	(Hungary) Ramon Ferencz							5^{2}		21	21
27	(Spain) Yeray Mujica			4						19	19
28	(Czech Republic) Petr Těšínský	Ret						4		19	19
29	(Portugal) Inês Ponte	7	12							17	17
30	(Spain) Axel Coronado	Ret		6		29				15	15
31	(New Zealand) John Kennard					6				15	15
32	(Austria) Bernhard Ettel						12	8		15	15
33	(Czech Republic) Ondrej Krajca							9^{1}		14	14
34	(Hungary) David Berendi			22	30	Ret	Ret	7		13	13
35	(Portugal) José Teixeira	8	Ret							11	11
36	(Portugal) Mario Castro	9	18							9	9
37	(Italy) Nicolò Gonella						9			9	9
38	(Poland) Tomasz Kotarba	Ret		11	15	Ret	14			8	8
39	(Spain) Eduardo González			10						7	7
40	(Hungary) Janos Czako						10			7	7
41	(France) Marine Pelamourgues			15	20	36	16	11		6	6
42	(Spain) Javier Martínez	11	17							5	5
43	(Estonia) Ken Jarveoja	25					11			5	5
44	(Portugal) Jorge Carvalho	Ret	11							5	5
45	(Austria) Ilka Minor				34^{1}	Ret				5	5
46	(Spain) Jordi Mercader		16	12	21		20			4	4
47	(Italy) Virginia Lenzi	20	22	17	Ret	25	19	12		4	4
48	(Brazil) Gabriel Morales	12	Ret							4	4
49	(Poland) Damian Syty				12					4	4
50	(Estonia) Kristo Tamm				16	13				3	3
51	(Spain) Alberto Chamorro			13			18			3	3
52	(Spain) Rodrigo Sanjuan			20				13		3	3
53	(Andorra) Claudi Ribeiro	13								3	3
54	(Sweden) Julia Thulin				13					3	3
55	(Italy) Giulia Paganoni						13			3	3
56	(Estonia) Rainis Raidma	14			19	17				2	2
57	(Italy) Nicola Arena	Ret	20	14			17			2	2
58	(Portugal) Jorge Henriques		14							2	2
59	(Poland) Grzegorz Dachowski				14					2	2
60	(Slovenia) Pia Sumer					14				2	2
61	(Czech Republic) Alexandra Skripova							14		2	2
62	(Spain) Javier Moreno	19		18	24	15	22			1	1
63	(Portugal) Hugo Magalhães			21	Ret		15	26		1	1
64	(Czech Republic) Kateřina Janovská			26	32	Ret	Ret	15		1	1
65	(Spain) Carlos Cancela	15	28	39	33					1	1
66	(Portugal) João Câmara		15							1	1

Key
Colour	Result
Gold	Winner
Silver	2nd place
Bronze	3rd place
Green	Points finish
Blue	Non-points finish
Blue	Non-classified finish (NC)
Purple	Did not finish (Ret)
Black	Excluded (EX)
Black	Disqualified (DSQ)
White	Did not start (DNS)
White	Cancelled (C)
Blank	Withdrew entry from the event (WD)

=== Teams' championship ===
Pos	Team	PRT1 (Portugal)	PRT2 (Portugal)	ESP1 (Spain)	POL (Poland)	LAT (Latvia)	ITA (Italy)	CZE (Czech Republic)	ESP2 (Spain)	Points	Best 7
1	(India) Team MRF Tyres	15	49	51	32	54	54	32	54	341	326
2	(Germany) Toksport WRT	24	54	45		41	24	24	24	236	236
3	(Germany) ADAC Opel Rallye Junior Team			30	47	26	30	45	30	208	208
4	Rallye Team Spain	60		19	24	30	21	21	21	196	196
5	(Spain) Suzuki Motor Ibérica	22	18	22	2		20		36	120	120
6	(Hungary) Topp-Cars Rally Team				17		19	13	21	70	70
7	(Czech Republic) Kowax 2BRally Racing				45	17		7		69	69
8	Eurosol Racing Team Hungary		24	9		13		21		67	67
9	(Poland) Plon RT	4			21	21	17			63	63
10	(Czech Republic) Yacco ACCR Team			11	13			38		62	62
11	Team Hyundai Portugal	38	21							59	59
12	(Hungary) Herczig Autosport Kft.					13	19	17		49	49
13	(Poland) BTH Import Stal Rally Team		9	17	7		13			46	46
13	(Czech Republic) Entry Engineering - ATT Investments				15		7	24		46	46
15	(Estonia) ALM Motorsport	24				21				45	45
15	(Estonia) OT Racing	11			8	26				45	45
17	(Poland) KG-RT	7	5	11	1	9	5	5		43	43
18	(Lithuania) Mažeikių ASK				19	19				38	38
19	(Portugal) Citroën Vodafone Team	19	15							34	34
20	CKR Estonia	21			11					32	32
21	(Poland) Orlen Team				30					30	30
21	(Czech Republic) Agrotec Škoda Rally Team							30		30	30
21	(Estonia) Tehase Auto				11	19				30	30
24	(Hungary) M-Sport Racing Kft.			13	15					28	28
25	(Austria) BRR Baumschlager Rallye & Racing Team						15	11		26	26
26	(Spain) Copi Sport			24						24	24
27	M-Sport Poland				9		13			22	22
28	(Italy) F.P.F. Sport						21			21	21
28	(Lithuania) Proracing Rally Team		17		4					21	21
30	(Spain) Revys Motorsport			19						19	19
31	(Andorra) ACA Esport			17						17	17
32	(Spain) Escudería Maspalomas			15						15	15
33	(Portugal) Play Racing		13							13	13
33	(Spain) Escudería Mollerussa			13						13	13
35	(Czech Republic) Samohýl Škoda Team							9		9	9
36	(Spain) Escudería Milesocasiones.com	5								5	5
