= Peugeot 208 Rally4 =

Peugeot Rally4 rally car

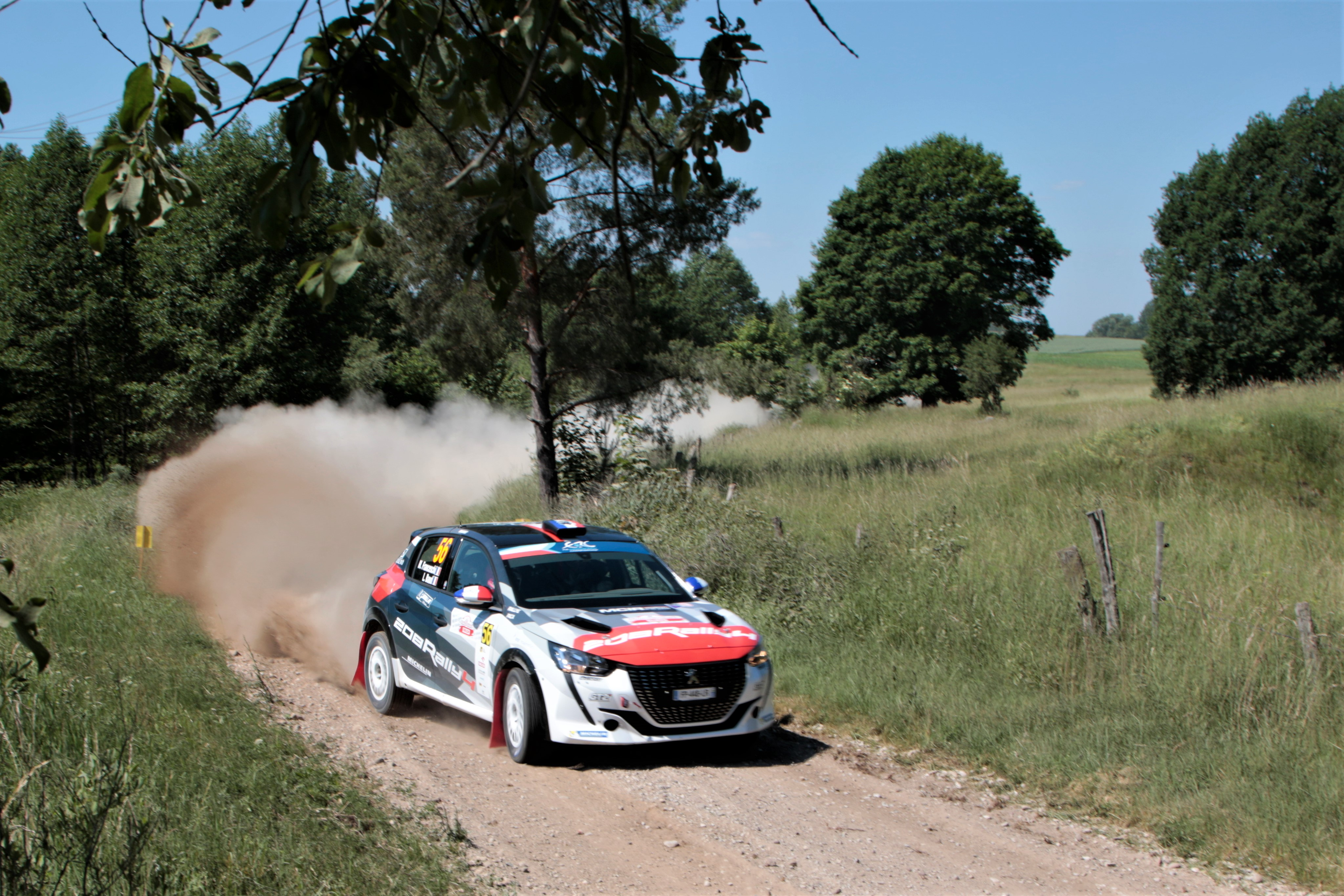
- A 208 Rally4 at the 2021 Rally Poland
- Category: Rally4
- Constructor: Peugeot Sport
- Designers: François Wales (Director, Stellantis Motorsport Customer Racing)
- Predecessor: Peugeot 208 R2

Technical specifications
- Engine: PSA 1.2 L 3-cylinder, 12-valve turbocharged front-engine, front-wheel-drive
- Transmission: Sadev 5-speed sequential 2-wheel drive
- Power: 212 PS (156 kW)
- Weight: 1,080 kg (2,381.0 lb)

Competition history
- Debut: 2020

The Peugeot 208 Rally4 is a rally car developed and built by Peugeot Sport for the Rally Pyramid regulation of the Rally4 category. It is based upon the Peugeot 208 road car and was launched in 2020 and is a successor to Peugeot 208 R2.

== Competition history ==
The car made its debut at the 2020 Castelo Branco Rally of Portugal.

== Rally victories ==
=== European Rally Championship-3 ===
Year	No.	Event	Surface	Driver	Co-driver
2020	1	(Portugal) 2020 Rally Fafe Montelongo	Tarmac	(Spain) Josep Bassas	(Spain) Axel Coronado
2021	2	(Italy) 2021 Rally di Roma Capitale	Tarmac	(Spain) Josep Bassas	(Spain) Axel Coronado
2021	3	(Czech Republic) 2021 Barum Czech Rally Zlín	Tarmac	(Spain) Josep Bassas	(Spain) Axel Coronado
2021	4	(Portugal) 2021 Rally Serras de Fafe e Felgueiras	Gravel	(Spain) Josep Bassas	(Spain) Axel Coronado

=== European Rally Championship-4 ===
Year	No.	Event	Surface	Driver	Co-driver
2022	1	(Portugal) 2022 Rally Serras de Fafe e Felgueiras	Gravel	(Spain) Óscar Palomo	(Spain) Xavi Moreno
2022	2	(Latvia) 2022 Rally Liepāja	Gravel	(Spain) Óscar Palomo	(Spain) Xavi Moreno
2023	3	(Portugal) 2023 Rally Serras de Fafe e Felgueiras	Gravel	(Italy) Roberto Daprà	(Italy) Luca Guglielmetti
2023	4	(Spain) 2023 Rally Islas Canarias	Tarmac	(Hungary) Bendegúz Hangodi	(Hungary) László Bunkoczi
2023	5	(Italy) 2023 Rally di Roma Capitale	Tarmac	(Italy) Roberto Daprà	(Italy) Luca Guglielmetti
2023	6	2023 Rally Hungary	Tarmac	(Romania) Norbert Maior	(Romania) Francesca Maior
2024	7	2024 Rally Hungary	Gravel	(United Kingdom) Max McRae	(United Kingdom) Cameron Fair
2024	8	(Italy) 2024 Rally di Roma Capitale	Tarmac	(Italy) Giorgio Cogni	(Italy) Simone Brachi
2024	9	(Czech Republic) 2024 Barum Czech Rally Zlín	Tarmac	(Hungary) Patrik Herczig	(Hungary) Kristóf Varga
2024	10	(United Kingdom) 2024 Rali Ceredigion	Tarmac	(United Kingdom) Max McRae	(United Kingdom) Cameron Fair
2025	11	(Spain) 2025 Rally Sierra Morena	Tarmac	(Spain) Sergi Pérez	(Spain) Axel Coronado
2025	12	(Sweden) 2025 Royal Rally of Scandinavia	Gravel	(Sweden) Victor Hansen	(Denmark) Ditte Kammersgaard
2025	13	(United Kingdom) 2025 Rali Ceredigion	Tarmac	(United Kingdom) Ioan Lloyd	(United Kingdom) Sion Williams
2025	Sources:				

=== Junior European Rally Championship ===
Year	No.	Event	Surface	Driver	Co-driver
2020 (Note: The championship was referred to as ERC3 Junior.)	1	(Portugal) 2020 Rally Fafe Montelongo	Tarmac	(Spain) Josep Bassas	(Spain) Axel Coronado
2022 (Note: The championship was referred to as ERC4 Junior.)	2	(Latvia) 2022 Rally Liepāja	Gravel	(Spain) Óscar Palomo	(Spain) Xavi Moreno
2023	3	(Italy) 2023 Rally di Roma Capitale	Tarmac	(Italy) Roberto Daprà	(Italy) Luca Guglielmetti
2023	4	2023 Rally Hungary	Tarmac	(Romania) Norbert Maior	(Romania) Francesca Maior
2024	5	2024 Rally Hungary	Gravel	(United Kingdom) Max McRae	(United Kingdom) Cameron Fair
2024	6	(United Kingdom) 2024 Rali Ceredigion	Tarmac	(United Kingdom) Max McRae	(United Kingdom) Cameron Fair
2025	7	(Spain) 2025 Rally Sierra Morena	Tarmac	(Spain) Sergi Pérez	(Spain) Axel Coronado
2025	8	(Sweden) 2025 Royal Rally of Scandinavia	Gravel	(Sweden) Victor Hansen	(Denmark) Ditte Kammersgaard
2025	Sources:				
