= Efrén Llarena =

Spanish rally driver

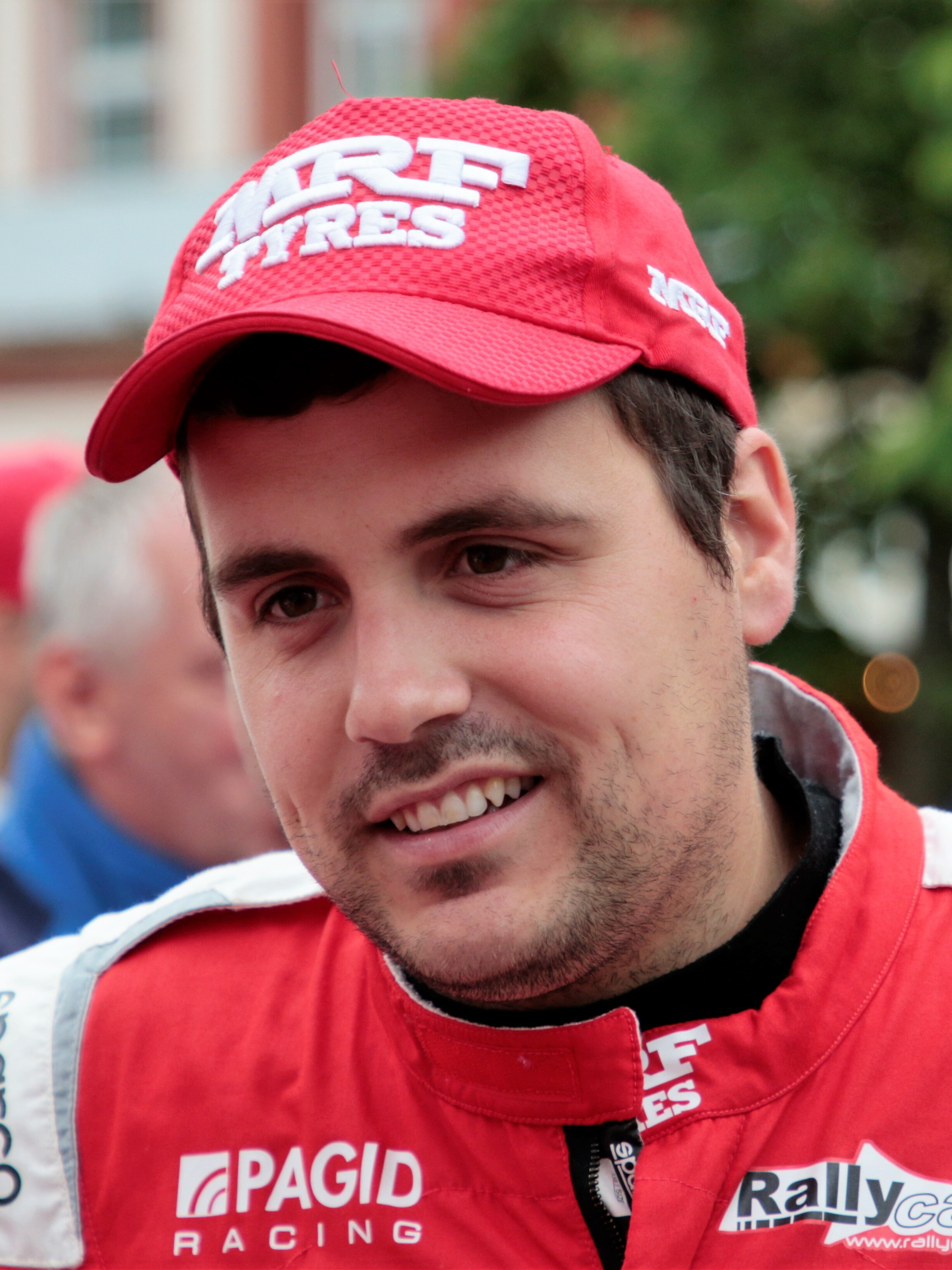
- Llarena at the 2022 Rally Poland

Personal information
- Nationality: (Spain) Spanish
- Full name: Efrén Llarena Sainz Aja
- Born: 26 May 1995 (age 31); Espinosa de los Monteros, Burgos, Castilla y León

World Rally Championship record
- Years active: 2025–present
- Co-driver: Sara Fernández
- Rallies: 1
- Championships: 0
- Rally wins: 0
- Podiums: 0
- Stage wins: 0
- Total points: 0
- First rally: 2025 Rally Islas Canarias

Efrén Llarena Sainz Aja (born 26 May 1995) is a Spanish rally driver. In 2021 he finished runner up in the European Rally Championship behind Andreas Mikkelsen whilst driving his long term co-driver Sara Fernández to the co-driver's championship title. The following year in 2022, Llarena won the European Rally Championship, securing the title with two rounds remaining in the championship.

== Career ==
Llarena made his rally debut in 2013 just weeks after his 18th birthday at the Rallysprint de San Miguel in a Renault Clio Sport. He continued to enter rallies in Spain in 2013, 2014 and 2015 and with co-driver Igor Zatika had some success in their class. He finished third in the Spanish Championship junior category in 2014. In 2016, he began working with Sara Fernández and alternated between a Suzuki Swift Sport and a Peugeot 208 R2. He won the Suzuki Swift Cup that year, run on Spanish Championship rallies, whilst also gaining more experience on French rallies. In 2017, the crew ran only in the Peugeot, winning the Spanish Gravel Junior Championship and the Volant Peugeot Cup in France.

In 2018, the crew entered the European Rally Championship (ERC) for the first time with Rally Team Spain. Llarena finished third in ERC3 and ERC3 Junior Championships. That year, he also debuted in four-wheel-drive in a Ford Fiesta R5 at Rally Comunidad de Madrid RACE, finishing fourth out of 88 starters. Entering ERC3 for two-wheel drive again in 2019 brought championship success. Three class wins at Azores Rally, Barum Czech Rally Zlín and Cyprus Rally helped to deliver the ERC3 and ERC3 Junior titles, this also helped propel Llarena to a R5 campaign in ERC in 2020. In this season, he finished sixth overall and third in the Junior category in a Citroën C3 Rally2, his best result coming at Rally Hungary where a third position put him on the podium.

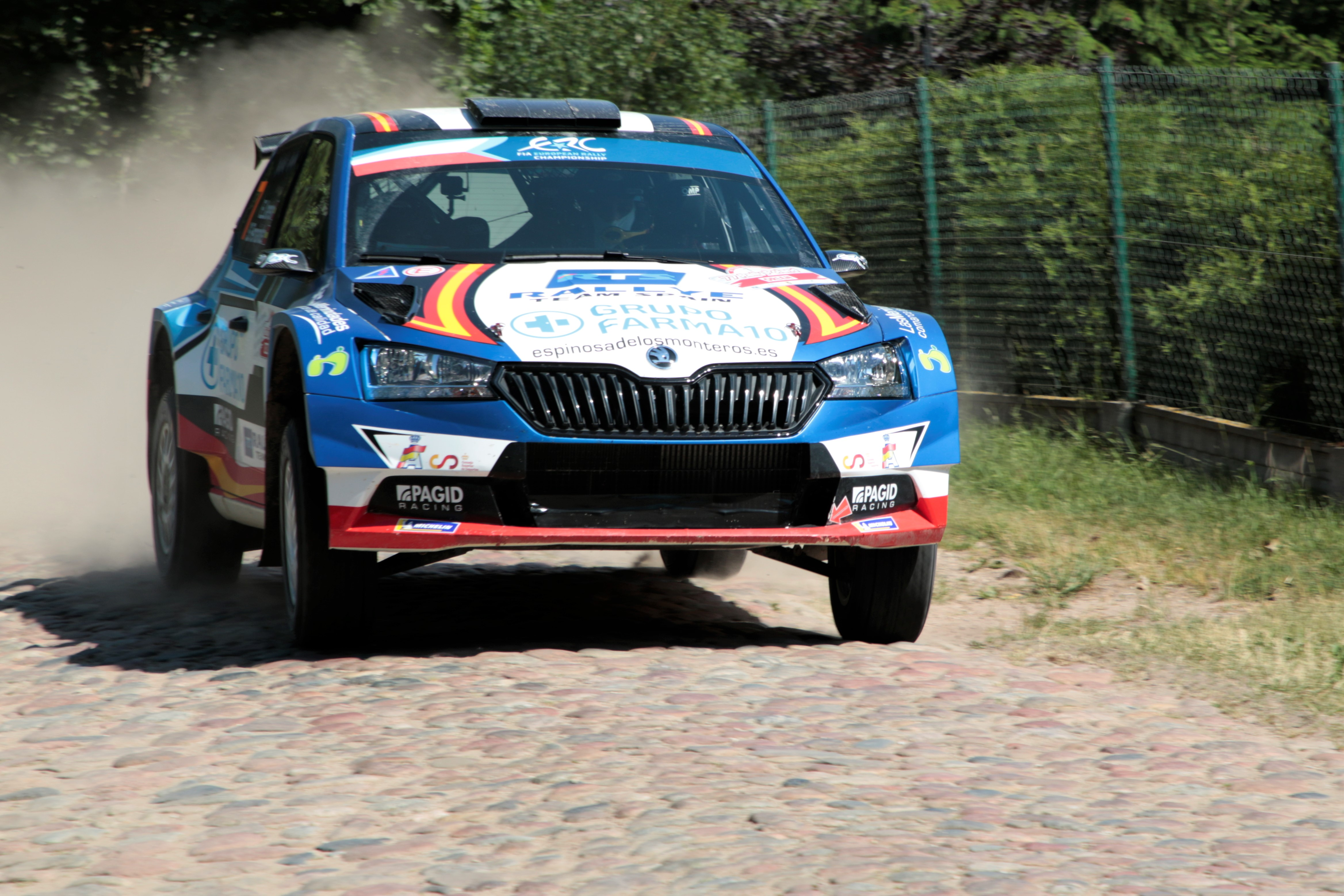
Rally Poland 2021, Llarena Efrén

In 2021, switching to a Škoda Fabia Rally2 evo, Llarena improved again by finishing second in the ERC behind ex-Volkswagen, Citroën and Hyundai works driver Andreas Mikkelsen. Remarkably, Llarena gained his first and only overall victory in 2021 although it was a non-championship event in Spain, the Rally de Tierra de Murchante.

In 2022, Llarena scored his first ERC win at the Azores Rallye, when he overtook local driver Ricardo Moura on the final stage. Llarena went on to win the series championship, securing his championship title at the start of the Barum Czech Rally Zlín.

== Career results ==
=== WRC results ===
Year	Entrant	Car	1	2	3	4	5	6	7	8	9	10	11	12	13	14	Pos.	Points
2025	Efrén Llarena	Citroën C3 Rally2	MON	SWE	KEN	ESP; 12	POR	ITA	GRE	EST	FIN	PAR	CHL	EUR	JPN	SAU	NC	0

=== WRC2 results ===
Year	Entrant	Car	1	2	3	4	5	6	7	8	9	10	11	12	13	14	Pos.	Points
2025	Efrén Llarena	Citroën C3 Rally2	MON	SWE	KEN	ESP; 4	POR	ITA	GRE	EST	FIN	PAR	CHL	EUR	JPN	SAU	27th	12

=== European Rally Championship results ===
Year	Entrant	Car	1	2	3	4	5	6	7	8	Pos.	Points
2018	Rallye Team Spain	Peugeot 208 R2	POR; 16	ESP; Ret	GRE	CYP	ITA; 19	CZE; 25	POL; 14	LAT	NC	0
2019	Rallye Team Spain	Peugeot 208 R2	POR; 13	ESP; 21	LAT; 23	POL; Ret	ITA; 20	CZE; 10			49th	1
2019	Peugeot Rally Academy	Peugeot 208 R2							CYP; 14	HUN	49th	1
2020	Rallye Team Spain	Citroën C3 R5	ITA; 6	LAT; 8	POR; Ret	HUN; 3	ESP; 20				6th	50
2021	Rallye Team Spain	Škoda Fabia R5 Evo	POL; 6	LAT; 4	ITA; 4	CZE; 6	POR; 3	POR; Ret	HUN; 4	ESP; 2	2nd	153
2022	Team MRF Tyres	Škoda Fabia Rally2 evo	POR; 10	POR; 1	ESP; 2	POL; 4	LAT; 2	ITA; 4	CZE; Ret	ESP; 2	1st	166
2023	Team MRF Tyres	Škoda Fabia RS Rally2	POR; 7	ESP; 3	POL; 10			ITA; 4			4th	88
2023	Team MRF Tyres	Škoda Fabia Rally2 evo				LAT; 9	SWE; Ret				4th	88
2023	Team MRF Tyres	Škoda Fabia R5							CZE; 8	HUN; 10	4th	88
2024	Team MRF Tyres	Škoda Fabia RS Rally2	HUN; Ret	ESP; 12	SWE; 14	EST	ITA; 14	CZE; 6	GBR	POL	10th	45
2025	Efrén Llarena	Citroën C3 Rally2	ESP; Ret	HUN	SWE	POL					36th	13
2025	Efrén Llarena	Toyota GR Yaris Rally2					ITA; 7	CZE	GBR	CRO	36th	13

=== European Rally Championship-3 results ===
Year	Entrant	Car	1	2	3	4	5	6	7	8	Pos.	Points
2018	Rallye Team Spain	Peugeot 208 R2	POR; 2	ESP; Ret	GRE	CYP	ITA; 3	CZE; 7	POL; 2	LAT	3rd	100
2019	Rallye Team Spain	Peugeot 208 R2	POR; 1	ESP; 4	LAT; 5	POL; Ret	ITA; 4	CZE; 1			1st	173
2019	Peugeot Rally Academy	Peugeot 208 R2							CYP; 1	HUN	1st	173
