= Mikko Heikkilä =

Finnish rally driver

Personal information
- Nationality: (Finland) Finnish
- Born: 17 January 1992 (age 34)

World Rally Championship record
- Years active: 2021–present
- Co-driver: (Finland) Kristian Temonen
- Rallies: 12
- Championships: 0
- Rally wins: 0
- Podiums: 0
- Stage wins: 0
- Total points: 4
- First rally: 2021 Arctic Rally Finland

Mikko Heikkilä (born 17 January 1992) is a Finnish rally driver. He is the champion of the 2022 Finnish Rally Championship.

== Rally career ==
Heikkilä made his rally debut in 2012. In 2022, he won the Finnish Rally Championship. Heikkilä would switch to drive Toyota GR Yaris Rally2 for 2024.

== Results ==
=== WRC results ===
Year	Entrant	Car	1	2	3	4	5	6	7	8	9	10	11	12	13	14	Pos.	Points
2021	Mikko Heikkilä	Škoda Fabia R5 evo	MON	ARC; 17	CRO	POR	ITA	KEN	EST; 14	BEL	GRE	FIN; 12	ESP; 46	MNZ			NC	0
2022	Mikko Heikkilä	Škoda Fabia Rally2 evo	MON	SWE	CRO; 18	POR	ITA	KEN	EST	FIN; 33	BEL	GRE	NZL	ESP; 24	JPN		NC	0
2023	Mikko Heikkilä	Škoda Fabia RS Rally2	MON	SWE	MEX	CRO	POR	ITA	KEN	EST	FIN; 11	GRE	CHL	EUR	JPN		NC	0
2024	Mikko Heikkilä	Toyota GR Yaris Rally2	MON	SWE; 9	KEN	CRO	POR	ITA	POL	LAT; 11	FIN; 8	GRE	CHL	EUR	JPN		24th	4
2025	Mikko Heikkilä	Škoda Fabia RS Rally2	MON	SWE; 11	KEN	ESP	POR	ITA	GRE	EST	FIN	PAR	CHL	EUR	JPN	SAU	NC*	0*

* Season still in progress.

=== WRC-2 results ===
Year	Entrant	Car	1	2	3	4	5	6	7	8	9	10	11	12	13	14	Pos.	Points
2022	Mikko Heikkilä	Škoda Fabia Rally2 evo	MON	SWE	CRO; 10	POR	ITA	KEN	EST	FIN; 12	BEL	GRE	NZL	ESP; 14	JPN		58th	1
2023	Mikko Heikkilä	Škoda Fabia RS Rally2	MON	SWE	MEX	CRO	POR	ITA	KEN	EST	FIN; 5	GRE	CHL	EUR	JPN		27th	10
2024	Mikko Heikkilä	Toyota GR Yaris Rally2	MON	SWE; 5	KEN	CRO	POR	ITA	POL	LAT; 2	FIN; 4	GRE	CHL	EUR	JPN		13th	40
2025	Mikko Heikkilä	Škoda Fabia RS Rally2	MON	SWE; 3	KEN	ESP	POR	ITA	GRE	EST	FIN	PAR	CHL	EUR	JPN	SAU	9th*	15*

* Season still in progress.

=== WRC-3 results ===
Year	Entrant	Car	1	2	3	4	5	6	7	8	9	10	11	12	Pos.	Points
2021	Mikko Heikkilä	Škoda Fabia R5 evo	MON	ARC; 3	CRO	POR	ITA	KEN	EST; 3	BEL	GRE	FIN; 2	ESP; 10	MNZ	7th	51

=== ERC results ===
Year	Entrant	Car	1	2	3	4	5	6	7	8	Pos.	Points
2020	TGS Worldwide	Škoda Fabia R5 evo	ITA	LAT; 7	POR	HUN	ESP				22nd	13
2022	Mikko Heikkilä	Škoda Fabia Rally2 evo	POR	POR	ESP	POL	LAT; 3	ITA	CZE	ESP	25th	21
2023	Mikko Heikkilä	Škoda Fabia Rally2 evo	POR; 8	ESP; 18	POL; 5	LAT; 7	SWE; 12				9th	49
2023	Mikko Heikkilä	Škoda Fabia RS Rally2						ITA; Ret	CZE	HUN	9th	49
2024	Mikko Heikkilä	Toyota GR Yaris Rally2	HUN; Ret	ESP	SWE; 2	EST; Ret	ITA	CZE	GBR	POL	17th	28
2026*	Mikko Heikkilä	Škoda Fabia RS Rally2	ESP	SWE; 1	ITA	POL	CZE	GBR	POR		4.º	30

* Season still in progress.
