= Nil Solans =

Spanish rally driver (born 1992)

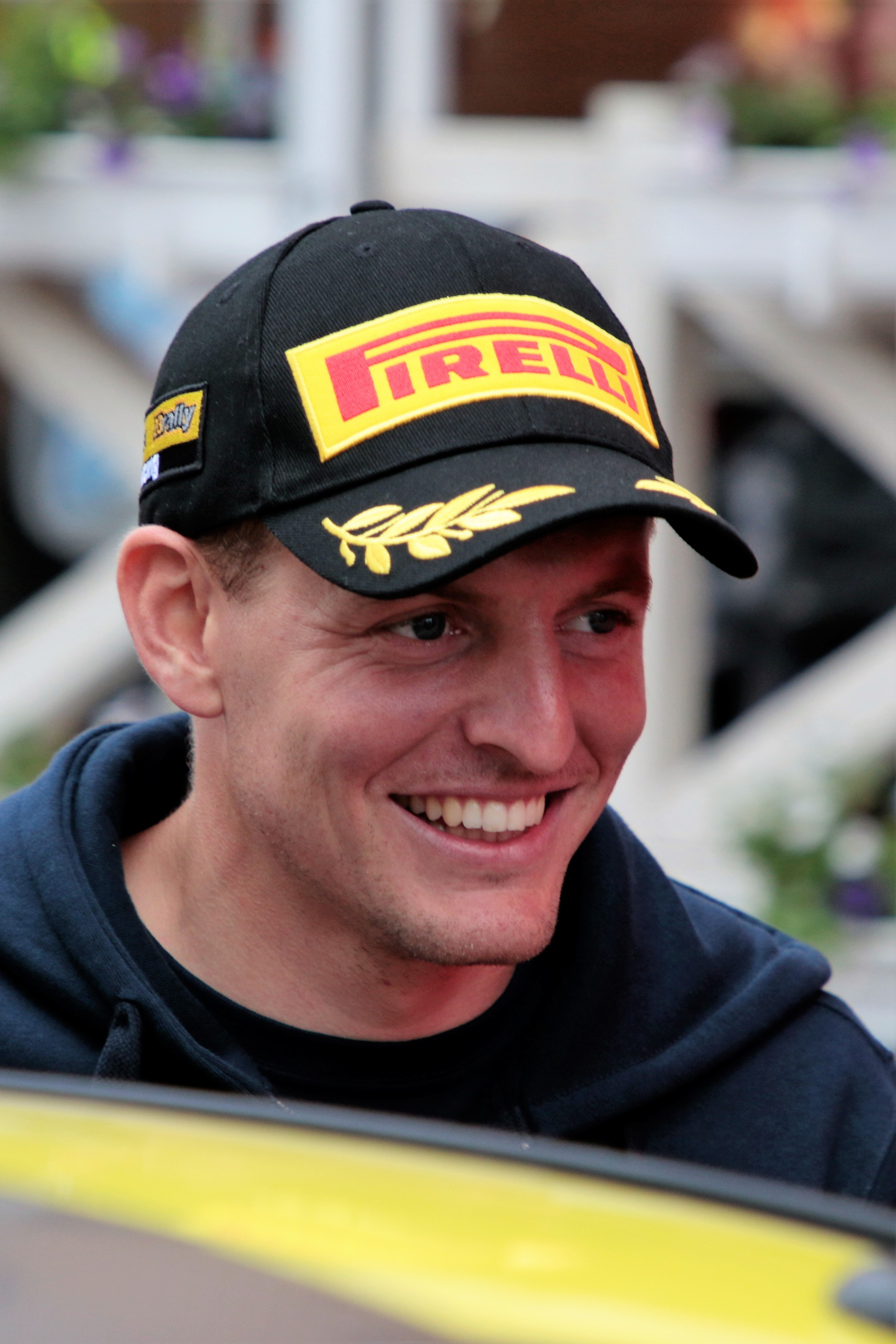
- Solans at the 2022 Rally Poland

Personal information
- Nationality: Spain
- Full name: Nil Solans Baldó
- Born: 14 April 1992 (age 34); Matadepera, Spain

World Rally Championship record
- Years active: 2012–2019, 2021
- Rallies: 31
- Championships: 0
- Rally wins: 0
- Podiums: 0
- Stage wins: 0
- Total points: 4
- First rally: 2012 Rally Finland
- Last rally: 2021 Rally Catalunya
- Last updated on: 18.10.2021.

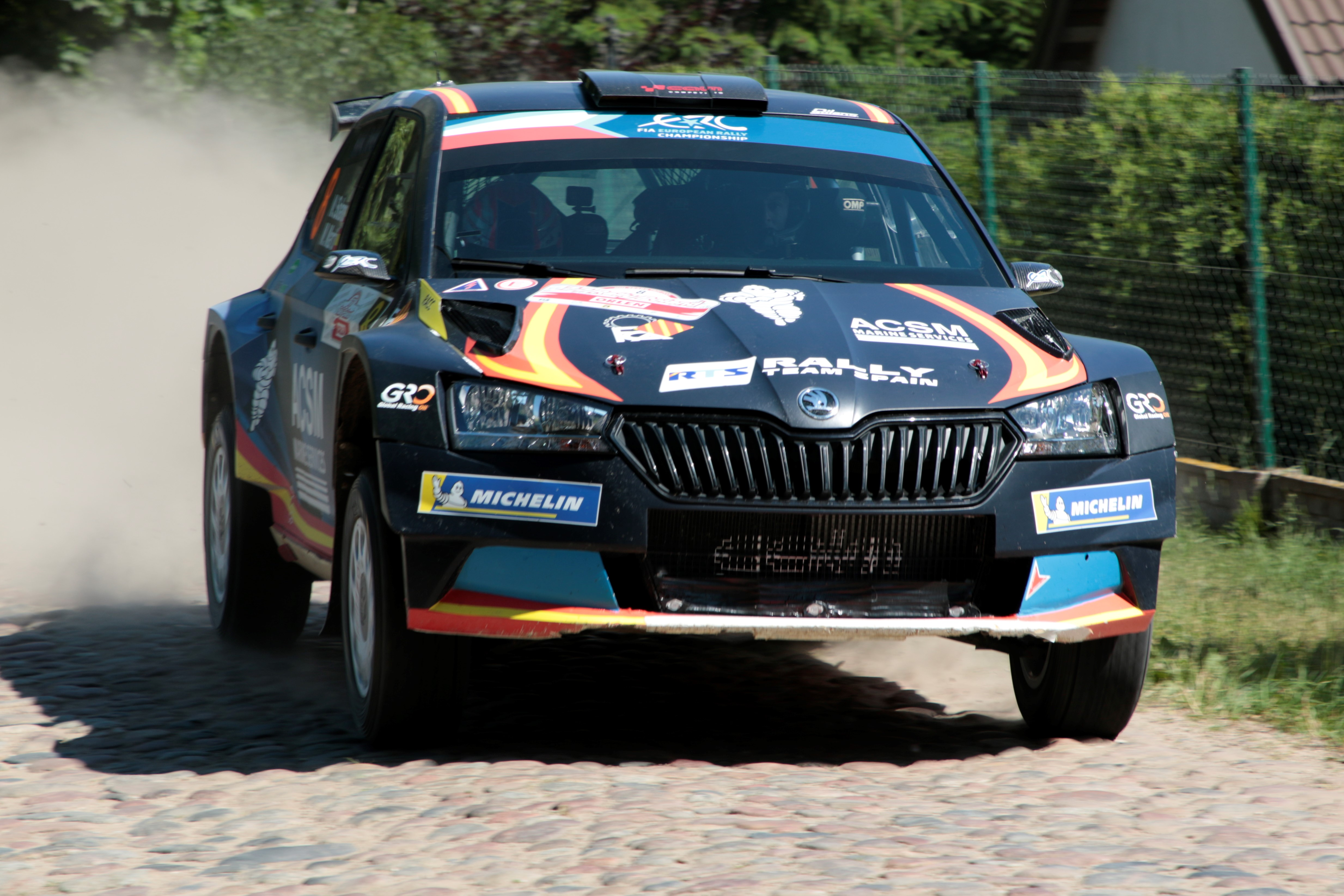
Solans at 2021 Rally Poland.

Nil Solans Baldó (Note: In this Spanish name, the first or paternal surname is Solans and the second or maternal family name is Baldó.) (born 14 April 1992) is a Spanish rally driver.

== Biography ==
Solans won the Junior World Rally Championship and WRC-3 in 2017 He also was the winner of the GSeries Andorra three years in a row (2015, 2016 and 2017), champion of the Spanish Rally Championship Gravel (CERT) in 2020 and of Catalonia in the two-wheel-drive category in 2013, winner of the Copa de España (gravel) in 2013 and runner-up in the CERT in 2014.

Solans currently races in European Rally Championship with Rally Team Spain, using a Skoda Fabia Rally2 evo. He is set to replace injured Pierre-Louis Loubet behind the wheel of 2C Competition prepared Hyundai i20 Coupe WRC during 2021 Rally Catalunya.

Solans is the older brother of Jan Solans, who is also a rally driver.

== Rally results ==
=== WRC results ===
Year	Entrant	Car	1	2	3	4	5	6	7	8	9	10	11	12	13	14	WDC	Points
2012	Nil Solans	Ford Fiesta R2	MON	SWE	MEX	POR	ARG	GRE	NZL	FIN; 41	GER	GBR	FRA	ITA	ESP		NC	0
2013	Escudería Motor Terrassa	Ford Fiesta R2	MON	SWE	MEX	POR	ARG	GRE	ITA	FIN	GER	AUS	FRA	ESP; Ret	GBR		NC	0
2014	Nil Solans	Ford Fiesta R2	MON	SWE	MEX	POR; Ret	ARG	ITA	POL; 47	FIN; 33	GER; 54	AUS	FRA	ESP; 26	GBR		NC	0
2015	Nil Solans	Ford Fiesta R2T	MON	SWE	MEX	ARG	POR; 34	ITA	POL; 51	FIN							NC	0
2015	ACSM Rallye Team	Peugeot 208 T16									GER; 20	AUS	FRA; 27	ESP; 49	GBR; 21		NC	0
2016	Escudería Motor Terrassa	Ford Fiesta R2T	MON	SWE	MEX	ARG	POR	ITA	POL	FIN	GER	CHN; C	FRA	ESP; 17	GBR	AUS	NC	0
2017	Nil Solans	Ford Fiesta R2T	MON	SWE	MEX	FRA; 23	ARG	POR; 30	ITA; 18	POL; 24	FIN; 25	GER; 39	ESP; 28	GBR	AUS		NC	0
2018	Nil Solans	Ford Fiesta R5	MON	SWE; 22	MEX; 21	FRA; 34	ARG; 18	POR; 19	ITA	FIN	GER; Ret	TUR	GBR; 42	ESP; 16	AUS		NC	0
2019	Nil Solans	Ford Fiesta R5	MON	SWE	MEX	FRA; Ret	ARG	CHL	POR	ITA; Ret	FIN	GER	TUR	GBR			NC	0
2019	Nil Solans	Volkswagen Polo GTI R5													ESP; 21	AUS; C	NC	0
2021	Hyundai 2C Competition	Hyundai i20 Coupe WRC	MON	ARC	CRO	POR	ITA	KEN	EST	BEL	GRE	FIN	ESP; 8	MNZ			24th	4

=== WRC-2 results ===
Year	Entrant	Car	1	2	3	4	5	6	7	8	9	10	11	12	13	WDC	Points
2015	ACSM Rallye Team	Peugeot 208 T16	MON	SWE	MEX	ARG	POR	ITA	POL	FIN	GER; 7	AUS	FRA; 7	ESP; 14	GBR; 8	18	20

=== ERC results ===
Year	Entrant	Car	1	2	3	4	5	6	7	8	Pos.	Points
2020	Team Vito Škoda	Škoda Fabia R5 evo	ITA	LAT	PRT	HUN	ESP; EX				NC	0
2021	Rallye Team Spain	Škoda Fabia Rally2 evo	POL; 4	LAT; 11	ITA; Ret	CZE	PRT1; Ret	PRT2; 5			7th	50
2021	Team MRF Tyres	Hyundai i20 N Rally2							HUN; Ret		7th	50
2021	Team MRF Tyres	Hyundai i20 R5								ESP; 13	7th	50
2022	Rallye Team Spain	Volkswagen Polo GTI R5	PRT1; 1	PRT2	ESP; 1						5th	70
2022	Nil Solans	Hyundai i20 N Rally2				POL; Ret	LAT; 11	ITA; WD	CZE	ESP2	5th	70

* Season still in progress.
