= Erik Cais =

Czech rally driver

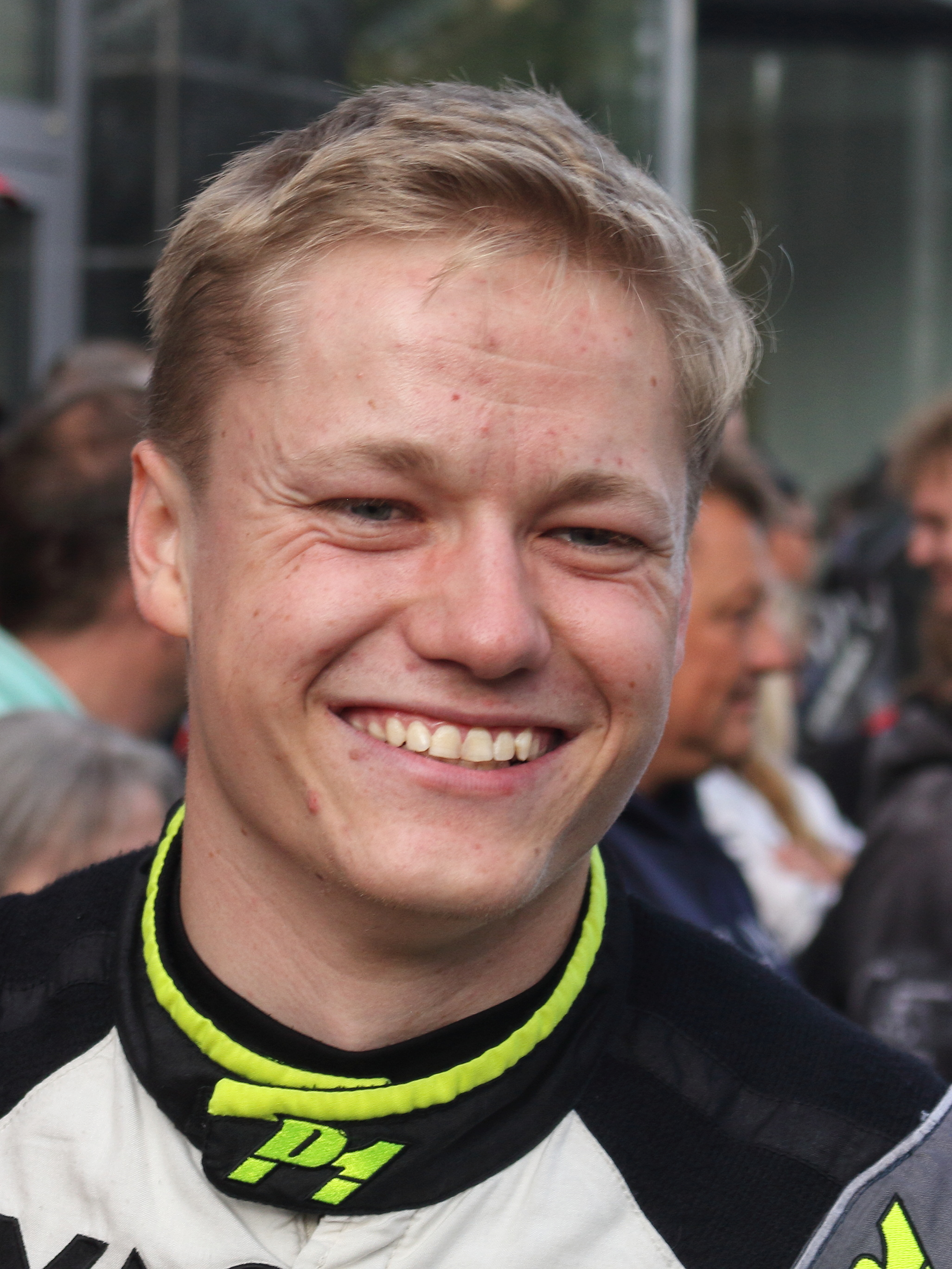

Personal information
- Nationality: (Czech Republic) Czech
- Born: 5 August 1999 (age 27); Zlín, Czech Republic

World Rally Championship record
- Years active: 2021–present
- Co-driver: (Czech Republic) Petr Těšínský
- Rallies: 5
- Championships: 0
- Rally wins: 0
- Podiums: 0
- Stage wins: 0
- Total points: 3
- First rally: 2021 Rally Catalunya

Erik Cais (born 5 August 1999) is a Czech rally driver born in Zlín, Czech Republic. His father is the former cyclist Miroslav Cais. Erik Cais is a current driver of the Yacco ACCR Team belonging to the Autoclub of the Czech Republic, his current co-driver is Jindřiška Žáková, who has navigated Martin Vlček in the past. Before his time in motorsport, Cais was a downhill bike racer alongside another rally driver, Frenchman Nicolas Vouilloz. His rally debut came in an Opel Adam Cup in 2018 before quickly moving to a Peugeot 208 R2 in the Czech championship. In the following year, he competed in the FIA European Rally Championship (ERC) behind the wheel of a Ford Fiesta R2T19. Since the 2019 Rallye du Var, his car has been the Ford Fiesta Rally2.

== Biography ==
In 2019, Cais received the 1st TALENT OF THE YEAR FIA CEZ award from FIA President Jean Todt. He also became the runner up in ERC3.

In 2020, the British motoring weekly Motorsport News named him one of the current top-ten world rally talents (who do not yet drive in the WRC premier class). He challenged in ERC in the main class that year, finishing 11th in the championship and fifth in the junior category.

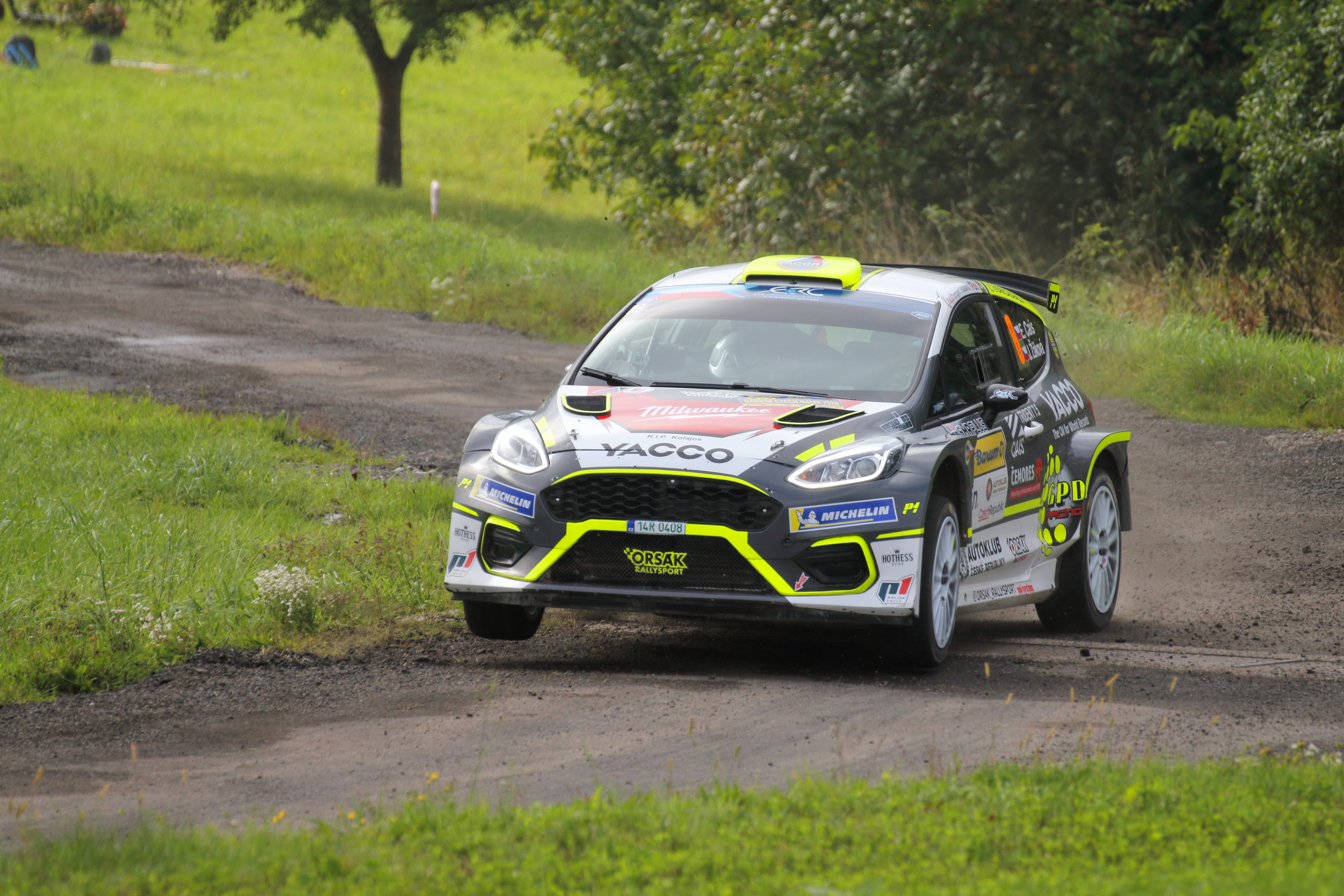
Cais at the 2021 Barum Czech Rally Zlín

In 2021, Cais improved in ERC, finishing sixth in the championship. At his home rally of Barum Czech Rally Zlín, he nearly earned his first ERC win, though he crashed on the final stage and was forced to retire after dominating the final day's stages. He appeared at the Auto UH Rallysprint Kopná race, where he won first place on almost home soil. He also shone at the Austrian Rally Weiz, from which he took second place. Another victory was not long in coming and at the Rally Poland Rajd Rzeszowski he finished in first place.

Cais also made his World Rally Championship debut in 2021 at the Rally Catalunya, finishing third in the WRC2 class. In December 2021, he announced he would compete in the WRC2 Championship in 2022.

== Career results ==
=== WRC results ===
Year	Entrant	Car	1	2	3	4	5	6	7	8	9	10	11	12	13	Pos.	Points
2021	Movisport	Ford Fiesta Rally2	MON	ARC	CRO	POR	ITA	KEN	EST	BEL	GRE	FIN	ESP; 13	MNZ		NC	0
2022	Yacco ACCR Team	Ford Fiesta Rally2	MON; 9	SWE	CRO; 14	POR; 42	ITA; Ret	KEN	EST	FIN	BEL	GRE	NZL	ESP	JPN	30th	2

* Season still in progress.

=== WRC-2 results ===
Year	Entrant	Car	1	2	3	4	5	6	7	8	9	10	11	12	13	Pos.	Points
2021	Movisport	Ford Fiesta Rally2	MON	ARC	CRO	POR	ITA	KEN	EST	BEL	GRE	FIN	ESP; 3	MNZ		14th	18
2022	Yacco ACCR Team	Ford Fiesta Rally2	MON; 2	SWE	CRO; 8	POR; 20	ITA; Ret	KEN	EST	FIN	BEL	GRE	NZL	ESP	JPN	18th	22

* Season still in progress.

=== ERC results ===
Year	Entrant	Car	1	2	3	4	5	6	7	8	Pos.	Points
2019	ACCR Czech Rally Team I	Ford Fiesta R2T19	AZO; 17	CAN	LIE; Ret	POL; 21	RMC; 17	CZE; 11	CYP; 15	HUN; 8	41st	4
2020	Yacco ACCR Team	Ford Fiesta Rally2	ITA; 37	LAT; 11	PRT; 6	HUN; 8	ESP; 34				11th	36
2021	Yacco ACCR Team	Ford Fiesta Rally2	POL; 9	LAT; 8	ITA; 10	CZE; Ret	PRT1; Ret	PRT2; 7	HUN; 7	ESP	6th	59
2022	Yacco ACCR Team	Ford Fiesta Rally2	PRT1; Ret	PRT2	ESP	POL	LAT	ITA	CZE; 4	ESP	25th*	12*

* Season still in progress.
