= Ford Fiesta Rally4 =

Ford Rally4 rally car

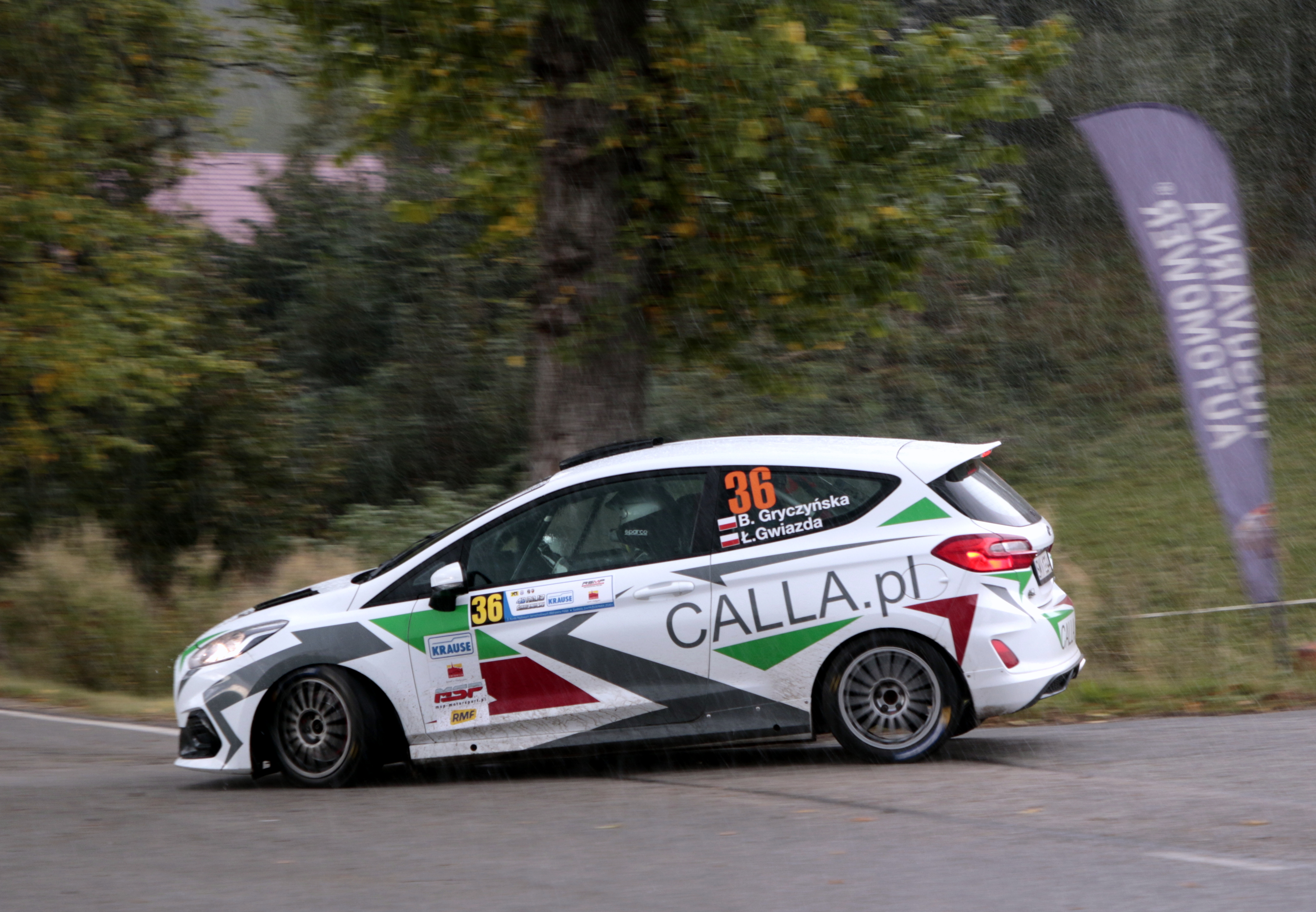
- A Fiesta Rally4 in 2020
- Category: Group Rally4
- Constructor: M-Sport
- Designer: Maciej Woda

Technical specifications
- Length: 4,065 mm (160.0 in)
- Width: 1,735 mm (68.3 in)
- Wheelbase: 2,490 mm (98.0 in)
- Engine: Ford EcoBoost 999 cubic centimetres (61.0 cu in; 0.999 L) 3-cylinder, 12-valve turbocharged
- Transmission: Sadev 5-speed sequential 2-wheel drive
- Power: 212 metric horsepower (156 kW; 209 bhp); 375 newton-metres (277 lbf⋅ft)
- Weight: 1,080 kg (2,381.0 lb)

Competition history

The Ford Fiesta Rally4 is a rally car developed and built by M-Sport and Ford Performance to FIA Group Rally4 regulations and designed for competition in the fourth tier of the Rally Pyramid. It is based upon the Ford Fiesta road car and is the updated version of the Ford Fiesta R2.

== Competition history ==
In addition to the junior support category of the World Rally Championship, the car is also one of the Rally4 cars available for competition in the European Rally Championship.

== Ford Fiesta R2 ==
Ford Fiesta R2
- Category: Group R2
- Constructor: M-Sport
- Predecessor: Ford Fiesta ST N3

Technical specifications
- Length: 3,953 mm (155.6 in)
- Width: 1,722 mm (67.8 in)
- Height: 1,481 mm (58.3 in)
- Wheelbase: 2,490 mm (98.0 in)
- Engine: Ford EcoBoost 1.0 L 3-cylinder, 12-valve turbocharged
- Transmission: Sadev 5-speed sequential 2-wheel drive
- Power: 212 metric horsepower (156 kW; 209 bhp)
- Weight: 1,080 kg (2,381.0 lb)

Competition history

== Rally victories ==
=== Junior World Rally Championship ===
Year	No.	Event	Surface	Driver	Co-driver
2019	1	2019 Rally Sweden	Snow	(Sweden) Tom Kristensson	(Sweden) Henrik Appelskog
2019	2	(France) 2019 Tour de Corse	Tarmac	(Germany) Julius Tannert	(Austria) Jürgen Heigl
2019	3	(Italy) 2019 Rally Italia Sardegna	Gravel	(Spain) Jan Solans	(Spain) Mauro Barreiro
2019	4	2019 Rally Finland	Gravel	(Sweden) Tom Kristensson	(Sweden) Henrik Appelskog
2019	5	(United Kingdom) 2019 Wales Rally GB	Gravel	(Spain) Jan Solans	(Spain) Mauro Barreiro
2020	6	2020 Rally Sweden	Snow	(Sweden) Tom Kristensson	(Sweden) Joakim Sjöberg
2020	7	2020 Rally Estonia	Gravel	(Latvia) Mārtiņš Sesks	(Latvia) Renārs Francis
2020	8	(Italy) 2020 Rally Italia Sardegna	Gravel	(Sweden) Tom Kristensson	(Sweden) Joakim Sjöberg
2020	9	(Italy) 2020 Rally Monza	Tarmac	(Sweden) Tom Kristensson	(Sweden) Joakim Sjöberg
2021	10	2021 Croatia Rally	Tarmac	(United Kingdom) Jon Armstrong	(United Kingdom) Phil Hall
2021	11	2021 Rally de Portugal	Gravel	(Latvia) Mārtiņš Sesks	(Latvia) Renārs Francis
2021	12	2021 Rally Estonia	Gravel	(Finland) Sami Pajari	(Finland) Marko Salminen
2021	13	(Belgium) 2021 Ypres Rally	Tarmac	(United Kingdom) Jon Armstrong	(United Kingdom) Phil Hall
2021	14	(Spain) 2021 Rally Catalunya	Tarmac	(Finland) Sami Pajari	(Finland) Marko Salminen

=== European Rally Championship-3 ===
Year	No.	Event	Surface	Driver	Co-driver
2019	1	(Latvia) 2019 Rally Liepāja	Gravel	(Estonia) Ken Torn	(Estonia) Kauri Pannas
2019	2	2019 Rally Poland	Gravel	(Estonia) Ken Torn	(Estonia) Kauri Pannas
2019	3	(Italy) 2019 Rally di Roma Capitale	Tarmac	(Estonia) Ken Torn	(Estonia) Kauri Pannas
2019	4	2019 Rally Hungary	Tarmac	(Czech Republic) Erik Cais	(Czech Republic) Jindřiška Žáková
2020	5	(Italy) 2020 Rally di Roma Capitale	Tarmac	(Estonia) Ken Torn	(Estonia) Kauri Pannas
2020	6	(Latvia) 2020 Rally Liepāja	Gravel	(Estonia) Ken Torn	(Estonia) Kauri Pannas
2020	7	2020 Rally Hungary	Tarmac	(Estonia) Ken Torn	(Estonia) Kauri Pannas
2020	8	(Spain) 2020 Rally Islas Canarias	Tarmac	(Estonia) Ken Torn	(Estonia) Kauri Pannas
2021	9	2021 Rally Poland	Gravel	(Finland) Sami Pajari	(Finland) Enni Mälkönen
2021	10	2021 Rally Hungary	Tarmac	(Finland) Sami Pajari	(Finland) Marko Salminen

=== European Rally Championship-4 ===
Year	No.	Event	Surface	Driver	Co-driver
2023	1	(Sweden) 2023 Royal Rally of Scandinavia	Gravel	(Sweden) Isak Reiersen	(Sweden) Lucas Karlsson
2024	2	2024 Rally Estonia	Gravel	(Estonia) Jaspar Vaher	(Estonia) Sander Pruul

=== Junior European Rally Championship ===
Year	No.	Event	Surface	Driver	Co-driver
2019 (Note: The championship was referred to as ERC3 Junior.)	1	(Spain) 2019 Rally Islas Canarias	Tarmac	(France) Jean-Baptiste Franceschi	(France) Anthony Gorguilo
2019	2	(Latvia) 2019 Rally Liepāja	Gravel	(Estonia) Ken Torn	(Estonia) Kauri Pannas
2019	3	2019 Rally Poland	Gravel	(Estonia) Ken Torn	(Estonia) Kauri Pannas
2019	4	(Italy) 2019 Rally di Roma Capitale	Tarmac	(Estonia) Ken Torn	(Estonia) Kauri Pannas
2020	5	(Italy) 2020 Rally di Roma Capitale	Tarmac	(Estonia) Ken Torn	(Estonia) Kauri Pannas
2020	6	(Latvia) 2020 Rally Liepāja	Gravel	(Estonia) Ken Torn	(Estonia) Kauri Pannas
2020	7	2020 Rally Hungary	Tarmac	(Estonia) Ken Torn	(Estonia) Kauri Pannas
2020	8	(Spain) 2020 Rally Islas Canarias	Tarmac	(Estonia) Ken Torn	(Estonia) Kauri Pannas
2021	9	2021 Rally Poland	Gravel	(Finland) Sami Pajari	(Finland) Enni Mälkönen
2021	10	2021 Rally Hungary	Tarmac	(Finland) Sami Pajari	(Finland) Marko Salminen
2023	11	(Sweden) 2023 Royal Rally of Scandinavia	Gravel	(Sweden) Isak Reiersen	(Sweden) Lucas Karlsson
2024	12	2024 Rally Estonia	Gravel	(Estonia) Jaspar Vaher	(Estonia) Sander Pruul
