= 2023 Portuguese Rally Championship =

The 2023 Portuguese Rally Championship is yet another season on national rally championship in Portugal. Armindo Araujo is the reigning drivers champion.

== Competitions ==
- Main championship - for all cars, with R5/Rally2 the highest class eligible
- Portugal 2RM - for all two-wheel drive cars
- Rally&You Portugal Cup - for local drivers using Peugeot 208 Rally4 or 208 R2 cars.

== Calendar ==
The 2023 season is contested over eight rounds across entire Portugal.

| Round | Start date | Finish date | Rally | Rally headquarters | Surface | Stages | Distance | Ref. |
|---|---|---|---|---|---|---|---|---|
| 1 | 10 March | 12 March | (Portugal) Rally Serras de Fafe e Felgueiras | Fafe, Braga | Gravel | 17 | 180.29 km | |
| 2 | March 31 | April 1 | (Portugal) Rallye Casinos do Algarve | Lagoa, Algarve | Gravel | 9 | 107,38 km | |
| 3 | April 28 | April 29 | (Portugal) Rali Terras d'Aboboreira | Amarante, Tâmega e Sousa | Gravel | 9 | 99,18 km | |
| 4 | May 11 | May 14 | Rally de Portugal | Matosinhos, Porto District | Gravel | 19 | 325,35 km | |
| 5 | June 30 | July 1 | (Portugal) Rali de Castelo Branco | Castelo Branco, Central Portugal | Tarmac | 12 | 101,82 km | |
| 6 | August 3 | August 5 | (Portugal) Rali Vinho da Madeira | Funchal, Madeira | Tarmac | TBA | TBA | |
| 7 | September 15 | September 16 | (Portugal) Rali da Agua | Chaves, District of Vila Real | Tarmac | TBA | TBA | |
| 8 | October 13 | October 14 | (Portugal) Rallye Vidreiro | Marinha Grande, Leiria | Tarmac | TBA | TBA | |

== Entry list ==
=== Rally2 ===
Rally2 entries
| Car used | Entrant | Number | Driver | Co-Driver | Tyres | Rounds |
|---|---|---|---|---|---|---|
| Citroën C3 Rally2 | (Portugal) Citroen Vodafone Team | 6 | (Portugal) Jose Pedro Fontes | (Portugal) Ines Ponte | P | 1-5 |
| Citroën C3 Rally2 | (Portugal) Sports&You | 4 | (Portugal) Bernardo Sousa | (Portugal) Ines Veiga | P | 1-2 |
| Citroën C3 Rally2 | (Portugal) Sports&You | 4 | (Portugal) Bernardo Sousa | (Portugal) Jose Janela | P | 3-5 |
| Citroën C3 Rally2 | (Portugal) Sports&You | 20 | (Portugal) Paulo Caldeira | (Portugal) Ana Goncalves | P | 1-3 |
| Ford Fiesta Rally2 | (Portugal) Racing 4 You | 12 | (Portugal) Lucas Simoes | (Portugal) Nuno Almeida | MR | 1-3 |
| Ford Fiesta Rally2 | (Portugal) Racing 4 You | 12 | (Portugal) Lucas Simoes | (Portugal) Nuno Almeida | P | 4 |
| Ford Fiesta R5 | (Portugal) Racing 4 You | 5 | (Portugal) Ricardo Filipe | (Portugal) Filipe Carvalho | P | 1-3, 5 |
| Hyundai i20 N Rally2 | Team Hyundai Portugal | 24 | (Portugal) Ricardo Teodosio | (Portugal) Jose Teixeira | P | 1-5 |
| Hyundai i20 N Rally2 | Team Hyundai Portugal | 42 | (Republic of Ireland) Craig Breen | (Republic of Ireland) James Fulton | P | 1-2 |
| Hyundai i20 N Rally2 | Team Hyundai Portugal | 77 | (United Kingdom) Kris Meeke | (Norway) Ola Floene | P | 3 |
| Hyundai i20 N Rally2 | Team Hyundai Portugal | 77 | (United Kingdom) Kris Meeke | (Republic of Ireland) James Fulton | P | 4-5 |
| Hyundai i20 N Rally2 | (Portugal) Hyundai N/M&Costas | 10 | (Portugal) Pedro Meireles | (Portugal) Pedro Alves | P | 1-5 |
| Hyundai i20 N Rally2 | (Portugal) Hyundai N/M&Costas | 45 | (Portugal) Paulo Meireles | (Portugal) Marco Goncalves | P | 2-3 |
| Škoda Fabia RS Rally2 | (Portugal) Team Armindo Araujo / The Racing Factory | 1 | (Portugal) Armindo Araujo | (Portugal) Luis Ramalho | MI | 5 |
| Škoda Fabia Rally2 evo | (Portugal) Team Armindo Araujo / The Racing Factory | 1 | (Portugal) Armindo Araujo | (Portugal) Luis Ramalho | MI | 1, 3 |
| Škoda Fabia Rally2 evo | (Portugal) Team Armindo Araujo / The Racing Factory | 1 | (Portugal) Armindo Araujo | (Portugal) Luis Ramalho | P | 4 |
| Škoda Fabia Rally2 evo | (Portugal) The Racing Factory | 15 | (Portugal) Pedro Almeida | (Portugal) Mario Castro | P | 1-4 |
| Škoda Fabia Rally2 evo | (Portugal) ARC Sport | 9 | (Portugal) Paulo Neto | (Portugal) Nuno Mota | MI | 1-3 |
| Škoda Fabia Rally2 evo | (Portugal) ARC Sport | 15 | (Portugal) Miguel Correia | (Portugal) Jorge Eduardo Carvalho | MI | 1-3, 5 |
| Škoda Fabia Rally2 evo | (Portugal) ARC Sport | 15 | (Portugal) Miguel Correia | (Portugal) Jorge Eduardo Carvalho | P | 4 |
| Škoda Fabia R5 | (Portugal) Diogo Salvi | 22 | (Portugal) Diogo Salvi | (Portugal) Hugo Magalhaes | P | 2-3 |
| Škoda Fabia R5 | (Portugal) Diogo Salvi | 22 | (Portugal) Diogo Salvi | (Portugal) Antonio Costa | P | 4 |

==== Rally2 changes ====
- Bruno Magalhaes left the championship and Team Hyundai Portugal. He was replaced by WRC Hyundai driver Craig Breen. After Breen's death in pre-event testing before Rally Croatia, the second seat at THP was taken by his close friend and former Citroen factory driver Kris Meeke. Hyundai also used a special livery in memory of Breen during Rali Terras d'Aboboreira.
- Lucas Simoes switched from running a Hyundai i20 R5 to a Ford Fiesta Rally2.
- Former SWRC driver Bernardo Sousa returned to the championship after taking part in the Portuguese edition of Big Brother.
