= 2021 European Rally Championship =

The 2021 European Rally Championship was the 69th season of the FIA European Rally Championship, the European continental championship series in rallying. The season was also the ninth following the merge between the European Rally Championship and the Intercontinental Rally Challenge. Alexey Lukyanuk was the reigning champion. Andreas Mikkelsen won the championship after 2021 Rally Hungary, using a Toksport WRT prepared Škoda Fabia Rally2 Evo. Mikkelsen therefore became the only driver to win the ERC and WRC-2 championship in one year and the first Norwegian to win ERC.

== Classes ==
- FIA ERC: Main open class for all current FIA-homologated cars within sporting classes RC2 to RC5, with Rally2 cars the leading contenders.
- FIA ERC2: Second tier, for cars more standard, albeit with turbocharged engines and four-wheel drive. This class allows the N4, the Rally2-Kit and RGT rules.
- FIA ERC3: Third ERC tier, the first for front-wheel-drive cars. Allows Rally4, Rally5, R3 (Group R) and Group A cars.
- FIA ERC Junior: For drivers aged 28 and under on 1 January 2021 in Rally3 cars. The champion receives a prize to contest the Junior World Rally Championship in 2022.
- FIA ERC3 Junior: For drivers aged 28 and under on 1 January 2021 in Rally4 and Rally5 cars on Pirelli control tyres. The winner earns a drive in ERC Junior in 2022.
- FIA European Rally Championship for Teams: each team can nominate a maximum of three cars (from all categories), counting the two highest-placed cars from each team.
- Abarth Rally Cup: competition with six rounds of the ERC with the rear-wheel-drive Abarth 124 rally.
- Clio Trophy by Toksport WRT: competition with five rounds of the ERC for Renault Clio RSR Rally5.

== Calendar ==
The 2021 season is contested over eight rounds across Central, Northern and Southern Europe:

Round	Start date	Finish date	Rally	Rally headquarters	Surface	Stages	Distance	Ref.
1	18 June	20 June	Rally Poland	Mikołajki, Warmia-Masuria	Gravel	14	202.76 km	
2	1 July	3 July	(Latvia) Rally Liepāja	Liepāja, Liepāja	Gravel	12	181.74 km	
3	23 July	25 July	(Italy) Rally di Roma Capitale	Fiuggi, Lazio	Tarmac	14	190.09 km	
4	27 August	29 August	(Czech Republic) Barum Czech Rally Zlín	Zlín, Zlín Region	Tarmac	15	210.92 km	
5	16 September	18 September	(Portugal) Azores Rallye	Ponta Delgada, Azores	Gravel	13	201.74 km	
6	1 October	3 October	(Portugal) Rally Serras de Fafe e Felgueiras	Fafe, Braga	Gravel	16	197.08 km	
7	22 October	24 October	Rally Hungary	Nyíregyháza, Szabolcs-Szatmár-Bereg	Tarmac	14	182.01 km	
8	18 November	20 November	(Spain) Rally Islas Canarias	Las Palmas, Canary Islands	Tarmac	17	197.29 km	

== Entries ==
=== ERC ===
Rally2 Entries
Constructor	Car	Entrant	Tyre	Driver	Co-Driver	Rounds	Category
Citroën	C3 Rally2	(France) Saintéloc Junior Team	P	(Russia) Alexey Lukyanuk	(Russia) Alexey Arnautov	1, 3–6, 8	
Citroën	C3 Rally2	(France) Saintéloc Junior Team	P	(Russia) Alexey Lukyanuk	(Russia) Dmitry Eremeev	2	
Citroën	C3 Rally2	(France) Saintéloc Junior Team	P	(Estonia) Roland Poom	(United Kingdom) Darren Garrod	1	
Citroën	C3 Rally2	(France) CHL Sport Auto	MI	(France) Yoann Bonato	(France) Benjamin Boulloud	All	
Citroën	C3 Rally2	(Poland) BTH Import Stal Rally Team	MI	(Poland) Łukasz Kotarba	(Poland) Tomasz Kotarba	1	
Citroën	C3 Rally2	(Italy) F.P.F. Sport (Note: Entered under driver's name.)	P	(Italy) Damiano De Tommaso	(Italy) Giorgia Ascalone	3	
Citroën	C3 Rally2	(Italy) Sportec Engineering	MI	(Italy) Rachele Somaschini	(Italy) Nicola Arena	3, 5	
Citroën	C3 Rally2	(Portugal) Auto Açoreana Racing	MI	(Portugal) Rúben Rodrigues	(Portugal) Estevão Rodrigues	5	
Citroën	C3 Rally2	(Portugal) Play Racing	P	(Portugal) Pedro Antunes	(Portugal) Pedro Alves	5	
Citroën	C3 Rally2	(Portugal) Citroën Vodafone Team	P	(Portugal) José Pedro Fontes	(Portugal) Inês Ponte	6	
Citroën	C3 Rally2	(Portugal) Sports & You	P	(Spain) Alexander Villanueva	(Spain) Víctor Ferrero	6	
Citroën	C3 Rally2	TRT Citroën Rally Team Hungary	P	(Norway) Mads Østberg	(Norway) Torstein Eriksen	7	
Citroën	C3 Rally2	(Spain) Citroën Rally Team	P	(Spain) Jan Solans	(Spain) Rodrigo Sanjuan	8	
Citroën	C3 Rally2	(Spain) Club Deportivo Todo Sport	MI	(Spain) Emma Falcón	(Spain) Eduardo González	8	
Škoda	Fabia R5 Evo	(Germany) Toksport World Rally Team	MI	(Norway) Andreas Mikkelsen	(Norway) Ola Fløene	1–3	
Škoda	Fabia R5 Evo	(Germany) Toksport World Rally Team	MI	(Norway) Andreas Mikkelsen	(Sweden) Jonas Andersson	4	
Škoda	Fabia R5 Evo	(Germany) Toksport World Rally Team	MI	(Norway) Andreas Mikkelsen	(United Kingdom) Elliott Edmondson	5–7	
Škoda	Fabia R5 Evo	(Germany) Toksport World Rally Team	MI	(Chile) Emilio Fernández	(Argentina) Rubén Garcia	1–2	
Škoda	Fabia R5 Evo	Rally Team Spain	MI	(Spain) Efrén Llarena	(Spain) Sara Fernández	All	
Škoda	Fabia R5 Evo	Rally Team Spain	MI	(Spain) Nil Solans	(Spain) Marc Martí	1–3, 5–6	
Škoda	Fabia R5 Evo	(Poland) Orlen Team	MI	(Poland) Miko Marczyk	(Poland) Szymon Gospodarczyk	All	
Škoda	Fabia R5 Evo	(Poland) Orlen Team	P	(Poland) Kacper Wróblewski	(Poland) Jakub Wróbel	1	
Škoda	Fabia R5 Evo	(Hungary) Škoda Rally Team Hungaria	P	(Hungary) Norbert Herczig	(Hungary) Ramón Ferencz	1–7	
Škoda	Fabia R5 Evo	(Slovakia) Rufa Motor-Sport	P	(Poland) Grzegorz Grzyb	(Poland) Michał Poradzisz	1	
Škoda	Fabia R5 Evo	(Slovakia) Rufa Motor-Sport	MI	(Czech Republic) Petr Semerád	(Czech Republic) Danny Persein	4, 7	
Škoda	Fabia R5 Evo	(Hungary) Botka Rally Team	MI	(Romania) Simone Tempestini	(Romania) Sergiu Itu	6–7	
Škoda	Fabia R5 Evo	(Italy) Delta Rally	MI	(Romania) Simone Tempestini	(Romania) Sergiu Itu	1–3	
Škoda	Fabia R5 Evo	(Italy) Delta Rally	P	(Italy) Alberto Battistolli	(Italy) Simone Scattolin	2–4, 6–7	
Škoda	Fabia R5 Evo	(Italy) Delta Rally	P	(Italy) Alberto Battistolli	(Italy) Lorenzo Granai	1	
Škoda	Fabia R5 Evo	(Italy) Delta Rally	P	(Italy) Giandomenico Basso	(Italy) Lorenzo Granai	3	
Škoda	Fabia R5 Evo	(Latvia) Sports Racing Technologies	P	(Lithuania) Vladas Jurkevičius	(Lithuania) Aisvydas Paliukėnas	1	
Škoda	Fabia R5 Evo	(Poland) Hołowczyc Racing	P	(Poland) Adrian Chwietczuk	(Poland) Jarosław Baran	1, 5	
Škoda	Fabia R5 Evo	(Poland) Marten Sport	P	(Poland) Wojciech Chuchała	(Poland) Sebastian Rozwadowski	1	
Škoda	Fabia R5 Evo	(Estonia) Tehase Auto	P	(Estonia) Gregor Jeets	(Estonia) Timo Taniel	1	
Škoda	Fabia R5 Evo	(Estonia) Tehase Auto	P	(Estonia) Raul Jeets	(Estonia) Timo Taniel	2	
Škoda	Fabia R5 Evo	(Portugal) The Racing Factory	MI	(Portugal) Aloísio Monteiro	(Portugal) Sancho Eiró	1–3, 5	
Škoda	Fabia R5 Evo	(Portugal) The Racing Factory	MI	(Portugal) Armindo Araújo	(Portugal) Luís Ramalho	6	
Škoda	Fabia R5 Evo	(Portugal) The Racing Factory	MI	(Argentina) Juan Carlos Alonso	(Argentina) Juan Pablo Monasterolo	8	
Škoda	Fabia R5 Evo	(Spain) Escudería Lalín-Deza	HK	(Spain) Luis Vilariño	(Spain) José Murado	1–2	
Škoda	Fabia R5 Evo	(Spain) Escudería Lalín-Deza	MI	(Spain) Luis Vilariño	(Spain) José Murado	3–6, 8	
Škoda	Fabia R5 Evo	(Czech Republic) Agrotec Škoda Rally Team	MI	(Czech Republic) Jan Kopecký	(Czech Republic) Jan Hloušek	4	
Škoda	Fabia R5 Evo	(Czech Republic) ACCR Laureta Auto Škoda Team	MI	(Czech Republic) Filip Mareš	(Czech Republic) Radovan Bucha	4	
Škoda	Fabia R5 Evo	(Czech Republic) Kresta Racing s.r.o.	MI	(Czech Republic) Tomáš Kostka	(Czech Republic) Ladislav Kučera	4	
Škoda	Fabia R5 Evo	(Czech Republic) TRT Technology	MI	(Slovakia) Martin Koči	(Czech Republic) Martin Turěcek	4	
Škoda	Fabia R5 Evo	(Poland) BTH Import Stal Rally Team	MI	(Austria) Simon Wagner	(Austria) Gerald Winter	4	
Škoda	Fabia R5 Evo	(Czech Republic) AR Racing	MI	(Czech Republic) Robert Adolf	(Czech Republic) Petr Novák	4	
Škoda	Fabia R5 Evo	(Austria) BRR Baumschlager Rallye & Racing Team	P	(Germany) Albert von Thurn und Taxis	(Austria) Bernhard Ettel	4, 8	
Škoda	Fabia R5 Evo	(Poland) Rally Technology	MI	(Czech Republic) Antonín Tlusťák	(Czech Republic) Michal Večerka	4	
Škoda	Fabia R5 Evo	(Portugal) ARC Sport	MI	(Portugal) Ricardo Moura	(Portugal) António Costa	5	
Škoda	Fabia R5 Evo	(Portugal) ARC Sport	MI	(Portugal) Miguel Correia	(Portugal) António Costa	6	
Škoda	Fabia R5 Evo	(Portugal) ARC Sport	MI	(Portugal) Luís Rego	(Portugal) Jorge Henriques	5	
Škoda	Fabia R5 Evo	(Portugal) ARC Sport	MI	(Portugal) Ricardo Teodósio	(Portugal) José Teixeira	6	
Škoda	Fabia R5 Evo	(Spain) Race Seven	MI	(Mexico) Benito Guerra	(Spain) Daniel Cué	5–6	
Škoda	Fabia R5 Evo	(India) Team MRF Tyres	MR	(Italy) Simone Campedelli	(Switzerland) Tania Canton	6–8	
Škoda	Fabia R5 Evo	V-V Rally Racing Kft. - Gulf Racing Hungary	P	(Hungary) Ádám Velenczei	(Slovakia) Igor Bacigál	7	
Škoda	Fabia R5 Evo	(Spain) Canarias Sport Club	MI	(Spain) Luis Monzón	(Spain) José Carlos Déniz	8	
Škoda	Fabia R5	(Finland) Printsport	P	(Finland) Eerik Pietarinen	(Finland) Antti Linnaketo	2	
Škoda	Fabia R5	(Finland) Printsport	MI	(Sweden) Lars Stugemo	(Sweden) Kalle Lexe	2	
Škoda	Fabia R5	(Italy) Motorsport Italia	MI	(Italy) Fabio Andolfi	(Italy) Stefano Savoia	3	
Škoda	Fabia R5	(Italy) Motorsport Italia	P	(Italy) Andrea Mazzocchi	(Italy) Silvia Gallotti	3	
Škoda	Fabia R5	(Czech Republic) ACA Škoda Vančík Motorsport	P	(Czech Republic) Dominik Stříteský	(Czech Republic) Jiří Hovorka	3–4	
Škoda	Fabia R5	(Czech Republic) Samohýl Škoda Team	MI	(Czech Republic) Miroslav Jakeš	(Czech Republic) Petr Machů	4	
Škoda	Fabia R5	(Czech Republic) Samohýl Škoda Team	MI	(Czech Republic) Adam Březík	(Czech Republic) Ondřej Krajča	4	
Škoda	Fabia R5	(Portugal) The Racing Factory	P	(Portugal) Rafael Botelho	(Portugal) Rui Raimundo	5	
Škoda	Fabia R5	(Hungary) Borsod Talent Motorsport Egyesület	P	(Hungary) Miklós Csomós	(Hungary) Attila Nagy	7	
Hyundai	i20 R5	(India) Team MRF Tyres	MR	(Republic of Ireland) Craig Breen	(Republic of Ireland) Paul Nagle	1–3	
Hyundai	i20 R5	(India) Team MRF Tyres	MR	(Finland) Jari Huttunen	(Finland) Mikko Lukka	4	
Hyundai	i20 R5	(India) Team MRF Tyres	MR	(Spain) Dani Sordo	(Spain) Cándido Carrera	5–6	
Hyundai	i20 R5	(India) Team MRF Tyres	MR	(Spain) Nil Solans	(Spain) Marc Martí	8	
Hyundai	i20 R5	(South Korea) Hyundai Motorsport N	MI	(Luxembourg) Grégoire Munster	(Belgium) Louis Louka	1–3	
Hyundai	i20 R5	(Italy) Hyundai Rally Team Italia	P	(Italy) Umberto Scandola	(Italy) Guido D'Amore	1–2	
Hyundai	i20 R5	(Italy) Hyundai Rally Team Italia	P	(Italy) Umberto Scandola	(Italy) Danilo Fappani	3–7	
Hyundai	i20 R5	(Italy) Hyundai Rally Team Italia	P	(Italy) Andrea Crugnola	(Italy) Pietro Ometto	3	
Hyundai	i20 R5	(Italy) Hyundai Rally Team Italia	P	(Italy) Alessandro Taddel	(Italy) Andrea Gaspari	6	
Hyundai	i20 R5	(Poland) APR Motorsport	MI	(Poland) Maciej Lubiak	(Poland) Grzegorz Dachowski	1	
Hyundai	i20 R5	Hyundai Poland Racing	P	(Poland) Jarosław Szeja	(Poland) Marcin Szeja	1	
Hyundai	i20 R5	(Finland) Printsport	P	(Norway) Ole Christian Veiby	(Sweden) Jonas Andersson	2–3	
Hyundai	i20 R5	(Russia) TAIF Motorsport	MI	(Russia) Radik Shaymiev	(Russia) Maxim Tsvetkov	2	
Hyundai	i20 R5	(Spain) Hyundai Ares Racing	P	(Spain) Iván Ares	(Spain) David Vázquez	3, 6, 8	
Hyundai	i20 R5	(Republic of Ireland) Motorsport Ireland Rally Academy	P	(Republic of Ireland) Josh McErlean	(United Kingdom) Keaton Williams	3	
Hyundai	i20 R5	(Republic of Ireland) Motorsport Ireland Rally Academy	P	(Republic of Ireland) Pauric Duffy	(Republic of Ireland) Jeff Case	3	
Hyundai	i20 R5	(Czech Republic) Hyundai Lenner Sport	MI	(Czech Republic) Ondřej Bisaha	(Czech Republic) Karel Voltner	4	
Hyundai	i20 R5	(Czech Republic) Hyundai Kowax Racing	MI	(Czech Republic) Petr Trnovec	(Czech Republic) Miroslav Staněk	4	
Hyundai	i20 R5	(Spain) Hyundai Motor España	MI	(Spain) Surhayén Pernía	(Spain) Alba Sánchez	8	
Hyundai	i20 N Rally2	(Czech Republic) Hyundai Kowax Racing	MI	(Czech Republic) Martin Vlček	(Czech Republic) Karolína Jugasová	4	
Hyundai	i20 N Rally2	Team Hyundai Portugal	MI	(Portugal) Bruno Magalhães	(Portugal) Carlos Magalhães	6	
Hyundai	i20 N Rally2	(India) Team MRF Tyres	MR	(Spain) Nil Solans	(Spain) Marc Martí	7	
Hyundai	i20 N Rally2	(Spain) Escudería Fuertwagen Motorsport	MI	(Spain) Yeray Lemes	(Spain) Rogelio Peñate	8	
Volkswagen	Polo GTI R5	(India) Team MRF Tyres	MR	(Italy) Simone Campedelli	(Switzerland) Tania Canton	1, 3	
Volkswagen	Polo GTI R5	(Italy) Movisport	P	(Latvia) Nikolay Gryazin (Note: Nikolay Gryazin is a Russian driver competing under a Latvian licence.)	(Latvia) Konstantin Aleksandrov (Note: Konstantin Aleksandrov is a Russian co-driver competing under a Latvian licence.)	1–3, 7	
Volkswagen	Polo GTI R5	(Italy) Movisport	P	(Italy) Giacomo Scattolon	(Italy) Giovanni Bernacchini	3	
Volkswagen	Polo GTI R5	(Poland) Tiger Energy Drink Rally Team	P	(Poland) Tomasz Kasperczyk	(Poland) Damian Syty	1	
Volkswagen	Polo GTI R5	(Germany) Pole Promotion	P	(Germany) Fabian Kreim	(Germany) Frank Christian	1–3	
Volkswagen	Polo GTI R5	(Estonia) ALM Motorsport	P	(Estonia) Georg Linnamäe	(Ukraine) Volodymyr Korsia	1–2	
Volkswagen	Polo GTI R5	(Poland) Rally Technology	P	(Poland) Zbigniew Gabryś	(Poland) Krzysztof Janik	1	
Volkswagen	Polo GTI R5	(Poland) Rally Technology	P	(Poland) Daniel Chwist	(Poland) Kamil Heller	8	
Volkswagen	Polo GTI R5	(Finland) Printsport	P	(Saudi Arabia) Rakan Al-Rashed	(Finland) Mikko Lukka	1	
Volkswagen	Polo GTI R5	(Italy) Balbosca Racing Team	P	(Italy) Tommaso Ciuffi	(Italy) Nicolò Gonella	3	
Volkswagen	Polo GTI R5	(Austria) BRR Baumschlager Rallye & Racing Team	P	(Germany) Albert von Thurn und Taxis	(Austria) Bernhard Ettel	3	
Volkswagen	Polo GTI R5	(Hungary) Turán Motorsport Kft.	HK	(Hungary) Frigyes Turán	(Hungary) László Bagaméri	7	
Ford	Fiesta R5 Mk. II	(Czech Republic) Yacco ACCR Team	MI	(Czech Republic) Erik Cais	(Czech Republic) Jindřiška Žáková	1–7	
Ford	Fiesta R5 Mk. II	(Czech Republic) Yacco ACCR Team	MI	(Czech Republic) Tomáš Kurka	(Czech Republic) Kateřina Janovská	4	
Ford	Fiesta R5 Mk. II	(Republic of Ireland) Motorsport Ireland Rally Academy	P	(Republic of Ireland) Callum Devine	(Republic of Ireland) James Fulton	1–4	
Ford	Fiesta R5 Mk. II	(Republic of Ireland) Motorsport Ireland Rally Academy	MI	(Republic of Ireland) Cathan McCourt	(Republic of Ireland) Brian Hoy	1–2	
Ford	Fiesta R5 Mk. II	(Poland) Plon Rally Team	P	(Poland) Jarosław Kołtun	(Poland) Ireneusz Pleskot	1–2	
Ford	Fiesta R5 Mk. II	(Poland) Plon Rally Team	MI	(Poland) Jarosław Kołtun	(Poland) Ireneusz Pleskot	3–4, 8	
Ford	Fiesta R5 Mk. II	(Hungary) DVTK SE	P	(Hungary) András Hadik	(Hungary) Krisztián Kertész	7	
Ford	Fiesta R5 Mk. II	(Spain) Copi Sport	MI	(Spain) Enrique Cruz	(Spain) Yeray Mújica	8	
Ford	Fiesta R5	(Poland) Witek Motorsport	P	(Poland) Marek Nowak	(Poland) Adam Grzelka	1	
Ford	Fiesta R5	(Republic of Ireland) Motorsport Ireland Rally Academy	MI	(Republic of Ireland) Jason Mitchell	(United Kingdom) Peter Ward	1–2	
Ford	Fiesta R5	(Portugal) Team Amaral	MI	(Portugal) Bruno Amaral	(Portugal) Rui Medeiros	5	
Proton	Iriz R5	(Malaysia) Proton Motorsports	MI	(United Kingdom) Nabila Tejpar	(United Kingdom) Matt Edwards	1	
Rally3 Entries
Constructor	Car	Entrant	Tyre	Driver	Co-Driver	Rounds	Category
Ford	Fiesta Rally3	M-Sport Poland	P	(Estonia) Ken Torn	(Estonia) Kauri Pannas	1–2, 4, 7–8	ERCJ
Ford	Fiesta Rally3	M-Sport Poland	P	(Estonia) Ken Torn	(Estonia) Timo Taniel	3	ERCJ
Ford	Fiesta Rally3	M-Sport Poland	P	(United Kingdom) Jon Armstrong	(United Kingdom) Phil Hall	1	ERCJ
Ford	Fiesta Rally3	M-Sport Poland	P	(Norway) Oscar Solberg	(United Kingdom) Dale Furniss	2–4	ERCJ
Ford	Fiesta Rally3	(Poland) APR Motorsport	MI	(Poland) Łukasz Byśkiniewicz	(Poland) Zbigniew Cieślar	1	
Ford	Fiesta Rally3	(Hungary) M-Sport Racing Kft.	P	(Hungary) Zoltán László	(Hungary) Annamária Kovács	1–2	
Ford	Fiesta Rally3	(Hungary) M-Sport Racing Kft.	P	(Hungary) Zoltán László	(Hungary) Zsolt Balázs	7	
Ford	Fiesta Rally3	(Poland) KG-Rally Team	MR	(Poland) Igor Widłak	(Poland) Daniel Dymurski	1–6	

=== ERC-2 ===
Group N Entries
Constructor	Car	Entrant	Tyre	Driver	Co-Driver	Rounds	Category
Mitsubishi	Lancer Evo X	(Hungary) Érdi Team Kft.	P	(Hungary) Tibor Érdi	(Hungary) Zoltán Csökő	1–2, 4, 7	
Mitsubishi	Lancer Evo X	(Russia) Prospeed	P	(Latvia) Dmitry Feofanov	(Latvia) Normunds Kokinš	2	
Mitsubishi	Lancer Evo X	(Latvia) Sporta klubs Autostils Rally Team	P	(Latvia) Ainārs Igaveņš	(Latvia) Ralfs Igaveņš	2	
Mitsubishi	Lancer Evo X	(Hungary) Kole Média Center Kft.	P	(Hungary) Csaba Juhász	(Hungary) István Juhász	3–4	
Mitsubishi	Lancer Evo X	(Hungary) Kole Média Center Kft.	P	(Hungary) Csaba Juhász	(Hungary) Zoltán Bencs	7	
Subaru	Impreza WRX STI	(Poland) Subaru Historic Rally Team	MR	(Poland) Michał Pryczek	(Poland) Jacek Pryczek	1–3	
Subaru	Impreza WRX STI	(Poland) Subaru Historic Rally Team	P	(Poland) Michał Pryczek	(Poland) Krzysztof Marschal	4	
Rally2-Kit (R4-Kit)
Suzuki	Swift R4	(Russia) TB Racing	P	(Latvia) Dmitry Feofanov (Note: Dmitry Feofanov is a Russian driver competing under a Latvian licence.)	(Latvia) Normunds Kokinš	1, 3–8	
Suzuki	Swift R4	(Spain) Suzuki Motor Ibérica	HK	(Spain) Javier Pardo	(Spain) Adrián Pérez	1, 3, 5–8	
Suzuki	Swift R4	(Spain) Suzuki Motor Ibérica	HK	(Andorra) Joan Vinyes	(Spain) Jordi Mercader	1, 3, 5–8	
Toyota	Yaris R4	(France) Victor Cartier Engineering	MI	(France) Victor Cartier	(France) Fabien Craen	1–7	
Škoda	Fabia R4	(Lithuania) Proracing Rally Team	P	(Finland) Teemu Asunmaa	(Finland) Topi Lihtinen	4 (WD)	
Škoda	Fabia R4	(Lithuania) Proracing Rally Team	P	(Ukraine) Serhii Potiiko	(Ukraine) Ivan Mishyn	4 (WD), 8	
Škoda	Fabia R4	(Hungary) Érdi Team Kft.	P	(Hungary) Tibor Érdi	(Hungary) Zoltán Csökő	8	
RGT Entries
Abarth	124 Rally RGT	(Poland) Rally Technology	P	(Poland) Dariusz Poloński	(Poland) Łukasz Sitek	1–4, 7–8	A Cup
Abarth	124 Rally RGT	(Czech Republic) Agrotec Czech Abarth Team	P	(Czech Republic) Martin Rada	(Czech Republic) Jaroslav Jugas	2, 4, 7	A Cup
Abarth	124 Rally RGT	(Italy) Evo Motorsport	P	(Italy) Roberto Gobbin	(Italy) Alessandro Cervi	3–4	A Cup
Abarth	124 Rally RGT	(Italy) Evo Motorsport	P	(Italy) Roberto Gobbin	(Italy) Fabio Grimaldi	7	A Cup
Abarth	124 Rally RGT	(Spain) Escudería La Palma Isla Bonita	P	(Spain) Carlos David García	(Spain) Nazer Ghuneim	8	A Cup

=== ERC-3 ===
Rally4 Entries
Constructor	Car	Entrant	Tyre	Driver	Co-Driver	Rounds	Category
Peugeot	208 Rally4	Rally Team Spain	P	(Spain) Josep Bassas	(Spain) Axel Coronado	All	
Peugeot	208 Rally4	Rally Team Spain	P	(Spain) Alejandro Cachón	(Spain) Alejandro López	1–4, 7	ERC3J
Peugeot	208 Rally4	(France) PH Sport	MI	(France) Mathieu Franceschi	(France) Lucie Baud	1	
Peugeot	208 Rally4	(Hungary) M-Sport Racing Kft.	P	(Hungary) Martin László	(Hungary) Dávid Berendi	1–4, 7–8	ERC3J
Peugeot	208 Rally4	(Hungary) Topp-Cars Rally Team	P	(Romania) Norbert Maior	(Romania) Francesca Maior	1–4, 7	ERC3J
Peugeot	208 Rally4	(Italy) Baldon Rally	P	(Italy) Giovanni Baruffa	(Italy) Simone Brachi	1	ERC3J
Peugeot	208 Rally4	(Portugal) PT Racing	P	(Portugal) Pedro Almeida	(Portugal) Hugo Magalhães	6	
Peugeot	208 Rally4	(Portugal) The Racing Factory	P	(Portugal) Ernesto Cunha	(Portugal) Rui Raimundo	6	
Peugeot	208 Rally4	(Italy) Delta Rally	P	(Belgium) Amaury Molle	(France) Yannick Roche	7	ERC3J
Peugeot	208 Rally4	(Hungary) Kole Média Center Kft.	P	(Hungary) Gábor Német	(Hungary) Tamás Szõke	7	
Peugeot	208 Rally4	(Hungary) Hideg Team SE	P	(Hungary) Gergő Szauer	(Hungary) István Kerék	7	
Peugeot	208 Rally4	(Hungary) Prestige Motorsport Kft.	P	(Hungary) Bendegúz Hangodi	(Hungary) László Bunkoczi	7	
Peugeot	208 Rally4	(Spain) Escudería Hierro Sur	P	(Spain) Zósimo Hernández	(Spain) Marcos Guerra	8	
Peugeot	208 R2	(France) Saintéloc Junior Team	P	(Bulgaria) Ekaterina Stratieva	(Bulgaria) Georgi Avramov	4	
Opel	Corsa Rally4	(Portugal) Sports & You	P	(Bulgaria) Ekaterina Stratieva	(Bulgaria) Georgi Avramov	8	
Opel	Corsa Rally4	(Poland) Evo Tech	P	(Poland) Łukasz Lewandowski	(Poland) Adrian Sadowski	1–4, 6–7	
Renault	Clio Rally4	(France) CHL Sport Auto	MI	(France) Florian Bernardi	(France) Xavier Castex	1, 3	
Renault	Clio Rally4	(France) CHL Sport Auto	P	(France) Anthony Fotia	(France) Arnaud Durand	7–8	ERC3J
Renault	Clio Rally4	(Germany) Toksport World Rally Team	P	(Norway) Ola Nore	(Norway) Jørgen Eriksen	1–3	ERC3J
Renault	Clio Rally4	(Germany) Toksport World Rally Team	P	(Norway) Ola Nore	(Norway) Marius Fuglerud	4	ERC3J
Renault	Clio Rally4	(Germany) Toksport World Rally Team	P	(Norway) Ola Nore	(Sweden) Lucas Karlsson	5–6	ERC3J
Renault	Clio Rally4	(Germany) Toksport World Rally Team	P	(Norway) Ola Nore	(Denmark) Ditte Kammersgaard	7	ERC3J
Renault	Clio Rally4	(Germany) Toksport World Rally Team	P	(France) Jean-Baptiste Franceschi	(France) Arnaud Durand	1	ERC3J
Renault	Clio Rally4	(Germany) Toksport World Rally Team	P	(France) Jean-Baptiste Franceschi	(France) Anthony Gorguilo	2–8	ERC3J
Renault	Clio Rally4	(Germany) Toksport World Rally Team	P	(Argentina) Paulo Soria	(Romania) Sergiu Itu	8	ERC3J
Renault	Clio Rally4	(Germany) Toksport World Rally Team	P	(Hungary) Patrik Herczig	(Hungary) Viktor Bán	7	
Renault	Clio Rally4	(Spain) Recalvi Team	MI	(Spain) Jorge Cagiao	(Spain) Amelia Blanco	8	
Ford	Fiesta Rally4	(France) TM Competition	P	(Belgium) Amaury Molle	(France) Florian Barral	1–3	ERC3J
Ford	Fiesta Rally4	(France) TM Competition	P	(Belgium) Amaury Molle	(France) Yannick Roche	4	ERC3J
Ford	Fiesta Rally4	(Austria) Drift Company Rally Team	P	(Austria) Nikolai Landa	(Austria) Günter Landa	1–2, 4	ERC3J
Ford	Fiesta Rally4	(Finland) Porvoon Autopalvelu	P	(Finland) Sami Pajari	(Finland) Enni Mälkönen	1	ERC3J
Ford	Fiesta Rally4	(Finland) Porvoon Autopalvelu	P	(Finland) Sami Pajari	(Finland) Marko Salminen	2–4, 7–8	ERC3J
Ford	Fiesta Rally4	(Estonia) OT Racing	P	(Estonia) Kaspar Kasari	(Estonia) Rainis Raidma	1–2	ERC3J
Ford	Fiesta Rally4	(Czech Republic) Yacco ACCR Team	P	(Germany) Nick Loof	(Portugal) Hugo Magalhães	1–4, 8	ERC3J
Ford	Fiesta Rally4	(Czech Republic) Yacco ACCR Team	P	(Czech Republic) Daniel Polášek	(Czech Republic) Kateřina Janovská	1–3	ERC3J
Ford	Fiesta Rally4	(Czech Republic) Yacco ACCR Team	P	(Czech Republic) Daniel Polášek	(Czech Republic) Petr Těšínský	4	ERC3J
Ford	Fiesta Rally4	(Latvia) LMT Autosporta Akadēmija	P	(Latvia) Mārtiņš Sesks	(Latvia) Renārs Francis	2	ERC3J
Ford	Fiesta Rally4	CKR Estonia	P	(Estonia) Joosep Ralf Nõgene	(Estonia) Simo Koskinen	2	ERC3J
Ford	Fiesta Rally4	(Hungary) Roger Racing Kft.	P	(Hungary) Adrienn Vogel	(Hungary) Ivett Notheisz	3–4, 7	
Ford	Fiesta Rally4	M-Sport Poland	P	(United Kingdom) Jon Armstrong	(United Kingdom) Phil Hall	7	ERC3J
Rally5 Entries
Constructor	Car	Entrant	Tyre	Driver	Co-Driver	Rounds	Category
Renault	Clio Rally5	(Italy) Northon Racing	MI	(Italy) Andrea Mabellini	(Italy) Virginia Lenzi	1–4, 7	C by T
Renault	Clio Rally5	(Germany) Toksport World Rally Team	MI	(France) Bastien Bergounhe	(France) Mathieu Descharne	1–4, 7	C by T
Renault	Clio Rally5	(Germany) Toksport World Rally Team	MI	(France) Ghjuvanni Rossi	(France) Baptiste Volpei	1–4, 7	C by T
Renault	Clio Rally5	(Germany) Toksport World Rally Team	MI	(Argentina) Paulo Soria	(Argentina) Marcelo Der Ohannesian	1–4, 7	C by T
Renault	Clio Rally5	(Germany) Toksport World Rally Team	MI	(Turkey) Yiğit Timur	(Turkey) Onur Aslan	2	C by T
Renault	Clio Rally5	(Germany) Toksport World Rally Team	MI	(Turkey) Yiğit Timur	(Turkey) Aras Dinçer	3–4, 7	C by T
Renault	Clio Rally5	(Germany) Toksport World Rally Team	MI	(Turkey) Yiğit Timur	(Turkey) Ufuk Uluocak	1	C by T
Renault	Clio Rally5	(Germany) Toksport World Rally Team	MI	(Turkey) Çağlayan Çelik	(Turkey) Ufuk Uluocak	6	

== Results and standings ==
=== Season summary ===
Round	Event	Winning driver	Winning co-driver	Winning entrant	Winning time	Ref.
1	Rally Poland	(Russia) Alexey Lukyanuk	(Russia) Alexey Arnautov	(France) Saintéloc Junior Team	1:48:31.3	
2	(Latvia) Rally Liepāja	(Latvia) Nikolay Gryazin	(Latvia) Konstantin Aleksandrov	(Latvia) Nikolay Gryazin	1:30:50.3	
3	(Italy) Rally di Roma Capitale	(Italy) Giandomenico Basso	(Italy) Lorenzo Granai	(Italy) Giandomenico Basso	1:54:06.6	
4	(Czech Republic) Barum Czech Rally Zlín	(Czech Republic) Jan Kopecký	(Czech Republic) Jan Hloušek	(Czech Republic) Agrotec Škoda Rally Team	2:00:07.2	
5	(Portugal) Rallye Açores	(Norway) Andreas Mikkelsen	(United Kingdom) Elliott Edmondson	(Germany) Toksport WRT	2:32:31.5	
6	(Portugal) Rally Serras de Fafe e Felgueiras	(Norway) Andreas Mikkelsen	(United Kingdom) Elliott Edmondson	(Germany) Toksport WRT	2:19:10.1	
7	Rally Hungary	(Norway) Mads Østberg	(Norway) Torstein Eriksen	TRT Citroen Rally Team Hungary	1:38:43.4	
8	(Spain) Rally Islas Canarias	(Russia) Alexey Lukyanuk	(Russia) Alexey Arnautov	(France) Saintéloc Junior Team	1:59:41.2	

=== Scoring system ===
Points for final position are awarded as in the following table in ERC, ERC-2, ERC-3, ERC Junior and ERC-3 Junior. In ERC, ERC-2 and ERC-3, the best seven scores from the eight rounds count towards the final number of points. In the junior categories, the best five from six rounds are retained.

Position	1st	2nd	3rd	4th	5th	6th	7th	8th	9th	10th	11th	12th	13th	14th	15th
Points	30	24	21	19	17	15	13	11	9	7	5	4	3	2	1

Additionally, bonus points are awarded for the first five positions in each Leg.

Position	1st	2nd	3rd	4th	5th
Points	5	4	3	2	1

In the Abarth Rally Cup and the Clio Trophy, points are awarded as in the following table. Bonus points are not awarded in these categories. The final round for Clio Trophy (Rally Hungary) is awarded with double points.

Position	1st	2nd	3rd	4th	5th	6th	7th	8th	9th	10th
Points	25	18	15	12	10	8	6	4	2	1

=== Drivers' Championships ===
==== ERC ====
Pos	Driver	POL (Poland)	LAT (Latvia)	ITA (Italy)	CZE (Czech Republic)	PRT1 (Portugal)	PRT2 (Portugal)	HUN (Hungary)	ESP (Spain)	Points	Best 7
1	(Norway) Andreas Mikkelsen	2^{24+9}	5^{17+5}	8^{11}	2^{24+7}	1^{30+9}	1^{30+10}	6^{15}		191	191
2	(Spain) Efrén Llarena	6^{15}	4^{19+3}	4^{19+5}	6^{15}	3^{21+5}	Ret	4^{19}	2^{24+8}	153	153
3	(Poland) Mikołaj Marczyk	3^{21+4}	6^{15+1}	5^{17+2}	5^{17+1}	5^{17}	9^{9+1}	2^{24+6}	3^{21+5}	161	151
4	(Russia) Alexey Lukyanuk	1^{30+8}	3^{21+5}	Ret^{0+3}	WD	Ret	2^{24+4}		1^{30+10}	135	135
5	(Hungary) Norbert Herczig	5^{17}	13^{3}	3^{21+5}	4^{19+2}	Ret	6^{15+1}	Ret^{4}		87	87
6	(Czech Republic) Erik Cais	9^{9}	8^{11+1}	10^{7}	Ret^{5}	Ret^{1x}	7^{13}	7^{13}		59	59
7	(Spain) Nil Solans	4^{19+1}	11^{5}	Ret		Ret	5^{17+4}	Ret	12^{4}	50	50
8	(France) Yoann Bonato	8^{11}	15^{1}	16	9^{9}	Ret	8^{11}	8^{11+3}	Ret	46	46
9	(Latvia) Nikolay Gryazin	Ret	1^{30+9}	21				22^{5}		44	44
10	(Republic of Ireland) Craig Breen	42^{0+4}	2^{24+6}	9^{9}						43	43
11	(Italy) Simone Campedelli	Ret		17			24^{0+2}	5^{17}	4^{19+3}	41	41
12	(Spain) Dani Sordo					2^{24+9}	12^{4+3}			40	40
13	(Italy) Giandomenico Basso			1^{30+9}						39	39
14	(Czech Republic) Jan Kopecký				1^{30+9}					39	39
15	(Norway) Mads Østberg							1^{30+7}		37	37
16	(Italy) Andrea Crugnola			2^{24+5}						29	29
17	(Czech Republic) Filip Mareš				3^{21+4}					25	25
18	(Portugal) Armindo Araújo						3^{21+3}			24	24
19	(Hungary) András Hadik							3^{21+3}		24	24
20	(Portugal) Ricardo Moura					4^{19+5}				24	24
21	(Italy) Umberto Scandola	13^{3}	Ret	12^{4}	WD	6^{15+1}	25	DSQ		23	23
22	(Portugal) Bruno Magalhães						4^{19+2}			21	21
23	(Spain) Enrique Cruz								5^{17+4}	21	21
24	(Romania) Simone Tempestini	Ret	10^{7}	7^{13+1}			Ret	WD		21	21
25	(Mexico) Benito Guerra					8^{11}	10^{7}			18	18
26	(Spain) Iván Ares			14^{2}			Ret		6^{15}	17	17
27	(Chile) Emilio Fernández	11^{5+2}	9^{9}							16	16
28	(Italy) Fabio Andolfi			6^{15}						15	15
29	(Poland) Wojciech Chuchała	7^{13+2}								15	15
30	(Republic of Ireland) Callum Devine	14^{2}	44	19	7^{13}					15	15
31	(Finland) Eerik Pietarinen		7^{13}							13	13
32	(Portugal) Luís Rego					7^{13}				13	13
33	(Spain) Surhayén Pernía								7^{13}	13	13
34	(Czech Republic) Miroslav Jakeš				8^{11}					11	11
35	(Spain) Luis Monzón								8^{11}	11	11
36	(Hungary) Miklós Csomós							9^{9+2}		11	11
37	(Italy) Alberto Battistolli	19	16	Ret	13^{3}		13^{3}	12^{4}		10	10
38	(Portugal) Rafael Botelho					9^{9}				9	9
39	(Spain) Jan Solans								9^{9}	9	9
40	(Spain) Luis Vilariño	WD	26	24	15^{1}	11^{5}	Ret		13^{3}	9	9
41	(Spain) Javier Pardo	23		26		10^{7}	16	17	23	7	7
42	(Finland) Sami Pajari	24	30	36	37			10^{7}	17	7	7
43	(Poland) Grzegorz Grzyb	10^{7}								7	7
44	(Slovakia) Martin Koči				10^{7}					7	7
45	(Spain) Yeray Lemes								10^{7}	7	7
46	(United Kingdom) Jon Armstrong	21						11^{5}		5	5
47	(Germany) Albert Von Thurn und Taxis			Ret	Ret				11^{5}	5	5
48	(Italy) Giacomo Scattolon			11^{5}						5	5
49	(Czech Republic) Petr Semerád				11^{5}			WD		5	5
50	(Portugal) Ricardo Teodósio						11^{5}			5	5
51	(France) Victor Cartier	30	Ret	41	Ret	12^{4}	Ret	24		4	4
52	(Poland) Adrian Chwietczuk	12^{4}				17				4	4
53	(Estonia) Georg Linnamäe	WD	12^{4}							4	4
54	(Czech Republic) Martin Vlček				12^{4}					4	4
55	(Luxembourg) Grégoire Munster	20	17	13^{3}						3	3
56	(France) Jean-Baptiste Franceschi	Ret	27	31	19	16	19	13^{3}	20	3	3
57	(Portugal) Bruno Amaral					13^{3}				3	3
58	(Estonia) Ken Torn	25	18	28	14^{2}			Ret	21	2	2
59	(Latvia) Dmitry Feofanov	29	24	40	Ret	14^{2}	21	23	32	2	2
60	(Spain) Alejandro Cachón	Ret		32	Ret			14^{2}		2	2
61	(Estonia) Raul Jeets		14^{2}							2	2
62	(Portugal) Miguel Correia						14^{2}			2	2
63	(Argentina) Juan Carlos Alonso								14^{2}	2	2
58	(France) Anthony Fotia							15^{1}	15^{1}	2	2
64	(Andorra) Joan Vinyes	31		27		15^{1}	17	Ret	Ret	1	1
65	(Czech Republic) Dominik Stříteský			15^{1}	Ret					1	1
66	(Estonia) Roland Poom	15^{1}								1	1
67	(Portugal) José Pedro Fontes						15^{1}			1	1

Key
Colour	Result
Gold	Winner
Silver	2nd place
Bronze	3rd place
Green	Points finish
Blue	Non-points finish
Blue	Non-classified finish (NC)
Purple	Did not finish (Ret)
Black	Excluded (EX)
Black	Disqualified (DSQ)
White	Did not start (DNS)
White	Cancelled (C)
Blank	Withdrew entry from the event (WD)

==== ERC-2 ====
Pos	Driver	POL (Poland)	LAT (Latvia)	ITA (Italy)	CZE (Czech Republic)	PRT1 (Portugal)	PRT2 (Portugal)	HUN (Hungary)	ESP (Spain)	Points	Best 7
1	(Spain) Javier Pardo	1^{30+10}		1^{30+10}		1^{30+9}	1^{30+10}	1^{30+10}	1^{30+8}	237	237
2	(Latvia) Dmitry Feofanov	2^{24+6}	1^{30+10}	4^{19+3}	Ret	3^{21+5}	3^{21+5}	2^{24+6}	3^{21+2}	197	197
3	(Poland) Dariusz Poloński	6^{15}	5^{17+3}	3^{21+5}	2^{24+7}			4^{19+4}	4^{19+2}	136	136
4	(Andorra) Joan Vinyes	4^{19+5}		2^{24+8}		4^{19+7}	2^{24+8}	Ret	Ret^{5}	119	119
5	(France) Victor Cartier	3^{21+5}	Ret	5^{17+3}	Ret^{4}	2^{24+7}	Ret^{3}	3^{21+6}		111	111
6	(Poland) Michał Pryczek	5^{17+4}	3^{21+5}	8^{11+1}	6^{15}					74	74
7	(Hungary) Tibor Érdi	Ret	2^{24+8}†		1^{30+10}			Ret	5^{17+4}	61	61
8	(Italy) Roberto Gobbin			6^{15}	4^{19+2}			5^{17+1}		54	54
9	(Hungary) Csaba Juhász			7^{13}	5^{17+2}			6^{15}		47	47
10	(Czech Republic) Martin Rada		6^{15}		3^{21+5}			Ret^{3}		44	44
11	(Spain) Carlos David García								2^{24+7}	31	31
12	(Latvia) Ainārs Igaveņš		4^{19+4}							23	23

Notes

† – Tibor Erdi finished 2nd in Rally Liepaja, but was unable to score points in both ERC and ERC-2 due to an illegal recce by a team member.

==== ERC-3 ====
Pos	Driver	POL (Poland)	LAT (Latvia)	ITA (Italy)	CZE (Czech Republic)	PRT1 (Portugal)	PRT2 (Portugal)	HUN (Hungary)	ESP (Spain)	Points	Best 7
1	(France) Jean-Baptiste Franceschi	Ret	1^{30+7}	2^{24+8}	2^{24+7}	1^{30+10}	2^{24+9}	3^{21+5}	4^{19+5}	223	223
2	(Spain) Josep Bassas	3^{21+5}	2^{24+5}	1^{30+8}	1^{30+9}	Ret	1^{30+8}	Ret	3^{21+6}	197	197
3	(Finland) Sami Pajari	1^{30+10}	3^{21+5}	4^{19+2}	13^{3+3}			1^{30+10}	2^{24+6}	163	163
4	(Poland) Łukasz Lewandowski	6^{15+1}	7^{13}	5^{17+1}	8^{11}		5^{17+2}	Ret		77	77
5	(Hungary) Martin László	Ret	15^{1}	6^{15+1}	4^{19+5}			6^{15}	6^{15}	71	71
6	(Germany) Nick Loof	5^{17}	4^{19+4}	7^{13}	15^{1}				8^{11}	65	65
7	(France) Anthony Fotia							5^{17+2}	1^{30+10}	59	59
8	(Romania) Norbert Maior	4^{19+3}	13^{3+3}	Ret^{0+2}	3^{21+5}			Ret^{0+3}		56	56
9	(Spain) Alejandro Cachón	Ret	WD	3^{21+8}	Ret			4^{19+2}		50	50
10	(Italy) Andrea Mabellini	12^{4}	6^{14}	8^{11}	6^{15}			13^{3}		48	48
11	(Argentina) Paulo Soria	9^{9}	16	9^{9}	10^{7}			10^{7}	7^{13}	45	45
12	(France) Ghjuvanni Rossi	10^{7}	9^{9}	11^{5}	9^{9}			11^{5}		35	35
13	(Czech Republic) Daniel Polášek	8^{11}	12^{4}	Ret	5^{17+1}					33	33
14	(France) Mathieu Franceschi	2^{24+8}								32	32
14	(United Kingdom) Jon Armstrong							2^{24+8}		32	32
16	(Estonia) Kaspar Kasari	7^{13}	5^{17+2}							32	32
17	(France) Bastien Bergounhe	11^{5}	10^{7}	12^{4}	7^{13}			Ret		29	29
18	(Portugal) Pedro Almeida						3^{21+7}			28	28
19	(Portugal) Ernesto Cunha						4^{19+4}			23	23
20	(Spain) Jorge Cagiao								5^{17+3}	20	20
21	(Belgium) Amaury Molle	13^{3}	11^{5}	Ret	WD			9^{9}		17	17
22	(Hungary) Adrienn Vogel			10^{7}	11^{5}			12^{4}		16	16
23	(Hungary) Bendeguz Hangodi							7^{13}		13	13
24	(Turkey) Yiğit Timur	Ret	8^{11}	Ret	Ret			Ret		11	11
24	(Hungary) Gergö Szauer							8^{11}		11	11
26	(Spain) Zósimo Hernández								9^{9}	9	9
27	(Norway) Ola Nore	Ret^{0+3}	Ret^{0+4}	DNS	DNS	DNS	WD	WD		7	7
28	(Bulgaria) Ekaterina Stratieva				12^{4}				Ret	4	4
29	(Austria) Nikolai Landa	Ret	14^{2}		14^{2}					4	4

==== ERC Junior ====
Pos	Driver	POL (Poland)	LAT (Latvia)	ITA (Italy)	CZE (Czech Republic)	HUN (Hungary)	ESP (Spain)	Points	Best 5
1	(Estonia) Ken Torn	2^{24+9}	1^{30+10}	1^{30+10}	1^{30+10}	Ret^{0+5}	1^{30+10}	233	228
2	(Norway) Oscar Solberg		2^{24+8}	Ret^{0+4}	2^{24+4}			60	60
3	(United Kingdom) Jon Armstrong	1^{30+9}						39	39

==== ERC-3 Junior ====
Pos	Driver	POL (Poland)	LAT (Latvia)	ITA (Italy)	CZE (Czech Republic)	HUN (Hungary)	ESP (Spain)	Points	Best 5
1	(France) Jean-Baptiste Franceschi	Ret	1^{30+8}	1^{30+9}	1^{30+8}	3^{21+5}	3^{21+7}	169	169
2	(Finland) Sami Pajari	1^{30+10}	2^{24+5}	3^{21+3}	5^{17+4}	1^{30+10}	2^{24+7}	185	164
3	(Germany) Nick Loof	3^{21+5}	3^{21+5}	5^{17+3}	7^{13+1}		6^{15}	101	101
4	(Hungary) Martin László	Ret^{0+1}	9^{9+1}	4^{19+3}	3^{21+7}	6^{15}	4^{19+2}	97	96
5	(Romania) Norbert Maior	2^{24+7}	7^{13+4}	Ret^{0+3}	2^{24+7}	Ret^{0+3}		85	85
6	(France) Anthony Fotia					5^{17+2}	1^{30+10}	59	59
7	(Spain) Alejandro Cachón	Ret	WD	2^{24+9}	Ret	4^{19+2}	WD	54	54
8	(Czech Republic) Daniel Polášek	5^{17+1}	6^{15}	Ret	4^{19+2}			54	54
9	(Belgium) Amaury Molle	6^{15}	5^{17}	Ret	WD	7^{13}		45	45
10	(Estonia) Kaspar Kasari	4^{19+2}	4^{19+3}					43	43
11	(United Kingdom) Jon Armstrong					2^{24+8}		32	32
12	(Austria) Nikolai Landa	Ret	8^{11}		6^{15}			26	26
13	(Argentina) Pauro Soria						5^{17+2}	19	19
14	(Norway) Ola Nore	Ret^{0+4}	Ret^{0+4}	DNS	DNS	WD		8	8

==== Abarth Rally Cup ====
Pos	Driver	POL (Poland)	LAT (Latvia)	ITA (Italy)	CZE (Czech Republic)	HUN (Hungary)	ESP (Spain)	Points
1	(Poland) Dariusz Poloński	1	1	1	1	1	2	143
2	(Italy) Roberto Gobbin			2	3	2		51
3	(Czech Republic) Martin Rada		2		2	Ret		36
4	(Spain) Carlos David García						1	25

==== Clio Trophy by Toksport WRT ====
Pos	Driver	POL (Poland)	LAT (Latvia)	ITA (Italy)	CZE (Czech Republic)	HUN (Hungary)	Points
1	(Italy) Andrea Mabellini	4	1	1	1	3	117
2	(Argentina) Paulo Soria	1	5	2	4	1	115
3	(France) Ghjuvanni Rossi	2	3	3	3	2	99
4	(France) Bastien Bergounhe	3	4	4	2	Ret	57
5	(Turkey) Yiğit Timur	Ret	2	Ret	Ret	Ret	18

=== Teams' Championship ===
Pos	Team	POL (Poland)	LAT (Latvia)	ITA (Italy)	CZE (Czech Republic)	PRT1 (Portugal)	PRT2 (Portugal)	HUN (Hungary)	ESP (Spain)	Points	Best 7
1	(Germany) Toksport World Rally Team	37	62	57	62	79	73	41	37	448	411
2	Rally Team Spain	36	57	61	54	27	62	41	59	397	370
3	(Finland) Porvoon Autopalvelu	40	26	25	16	40			30	177	177
4	(Poland) Orlen Team	26	19	23	18	21	12	31	26	176	164
5	(India) Team MRF Tyres	4	38	19	0	33	16	17	26	153	153
6	(France) Saintéloc Junior Team	40	31	4		0	28		40	143	143
7	(Czech Republic) Yacco ACCR Team	30	30	15	23	0	16	13		127	127
8	(France) CHL Sport Auto	11	5	5	9	0	13	33	40	116	116
9	(Hungary) Škoda Rally Team Hungaria	17	9	31	21	0	19	5		102	102
10	(Hungary) M-Sport Racing Kft.	0	10	23	24			19	15	91	91
11	(Hungary) Topp-Cars Rally Team	31	16	3	26			0		76	76
12	(Italy) Northon Racing	18	18	18	15			7		76	76
13	(Italy) Hyundai Rally Team Italia	4	0	46		19	1	0		70	70
14	(Estonia) OT Racing	25	24							49	49
15	(Spain) Suzuki Motor Ibérica	0		0		26	9	7	0	42	42
16	M-Sport Poland	0	4	0	3			32	1	40	40
17	(Czech Republic) Agrotec Škoda Rally Team				39					39	39
18	TRT Citroën Rally Team Hungary							38		38	38
19=	(Czech Republic) ACCR Laureta Auto Škoda Team				25					25	25
19=	(Hungary) DVTK SE							25		25	25
21	Team Hyundai Portugal						24			24	24
22	(Spain) Hyundai Ares Racing			9					15	24	24
23	(Austria) Drift Company Rally Team	0	11		11					22	22
24	(Spain) C.D. Copi Sport								21	21	21
25	(Spain) Recalvi Team								20	20	20
26	(Republic of Ireland) Motorsport Ireland Rally Academy	3	0	3	13					19	19
27	(Spain) Escudería Lalín-Deza		0	1	2	13	0		3	19	19
28	(Finland) Printsport		16	0						16	16
29	(Poland) Marten Sport	15								15	15
30	(Poland) Hołowczyc Racing	5				9				14	14
31=	(Hungary) Prestige Motorsport Kft.							13		13	13
31=	(Spain) Hyundai Motor España								13	13	13
33	(Slovakia) Rufa Motor-Sport	7			5					12	12
34=	(Estonia) ALM Motorsport		11							11	11
34=	(Czech Republic) Samohýl Škoda Team				11					11	11
34=	(Hungary) Borsod Talent Motorsport Egyesület							11		11	11
34=	(Hungary) Hideg Team SE							11		11	11
34=	(Spain) Canarias Sport Club								11	11	11
34=	(Spain) Esc. Hierro Sur								11	11	11
40	(Poland) KG-Rally Team	0	0	0	0	7	3			10	10
41=	(Hungary) Roger Racing Kft.							9		9	9
41=	(Spain) Citroën Rally Team								9	9	9
43=	(Czech Republic) ACA Škoda Vančík Motorsport			7	0					7	7
43=	(Estonia) Tehase Auto		7							7	7
43=	(Czech Republic) TRT Technology				7					7	7
43=	(Portugal) Citroën Vodafone Team						7			7	7
43=	(Portugal) C.D. Fuertwagen Motorsport								7	7	7
48	(Poland) Rally Technology	0	0	0	0			5	2	7	7
49	(Austria) BRR Baumschlager Rallye & Racing Team			R	R				5	5	5
50	(Poland) Plon Rally Team	0	3	2					R	5	5
51	(Czech Republic) Hyundai Kowax Racing				4					4	4
52	(Russia) TAIF Motorsport		2							2	2
53	(Poland) Tiger Energy Drink Rally Team	1								1	1
54	(Hungary) Érdi Team Kft.	0	0		1			R	0	1	1
