= 2020 European Rally Championship =

Rallying event in Europe

The 2020 European Rally Championship was the 68th season of the FIA European Rally Championship, the European continental championship series in rallying. The season was also the eighth following the merge between the European Rally Championship and the Intercontinental Rally Challenge. Chris Ingram was the reigning champion, but did not return to defend the title. Alexey Lukyanuk won the championship in Citroën C3 R5.

== ERC Classes ==
The classes are:

- FIA ERC: Main class, for FIA-homologated cars with R5 regulations.
- FIA ERC2: Second tier, for cars more standard, albeit with turbocharged engines and four-wheel drive. This class allows the N4, the R4-K and RGT rules.
- FIA ERC3: Third ERC tier, for front-wheel-drive cars. Allows R3 and R2 cars.
- FIA ERC1 Junior: For drivers aged 28 and under on 1 January 2020 in R5 cars.
- FIA ERC3 Junior: For drivers aged 27 and under on 1 January 2020 in R2 cars on Pirelli control tyres.
- ERC Ladies Trophy: for female drivers including all classes (ERC1, ERC2 and ERC3) eligible.
- Abarth Rally Cup: for Abarth 124 Rally RGT cars.
- FIA European Rally Championship for Teams: each team can nominate a maximum of three cars (from all categories), counting the two highest-placed cars from each team.
- ERC Nations Cup: like the ERC for Teams but for teams supported by a national motorsport federation or automobile association.

== Calendar ==
The final 2020 calendar featured 5 rallies - 4 tarmac rounds and only 1 gravel round. Rally di Roma Capitale turned out to be the inaugural event. Rally Liepaja was the second and the only gravel round. Rally Fafe Montelongo was added to calendar during the season after the cancelation of multiple events as the third round. Rally Hungary and Rally Islas Canarias remained in the calendar.

Round	Dates	Rally name	Surface	
1	24–26 July	(Italy) Rally di Roma Capitale	Tarmac	ERC Junior Round 1
2	14–16 August	(Latvia) Rally Liepāja	Gravel	ERC Junior Round 2
3	2–4 October	(Portugal) Rally Fafe Montelongo	Asphalt	ERC Junior Round 3
4	6–8 November	2nd Rally Hungary	Asphalt	ERC Junior Round 4
5	26–28 November	(Spain) Rally Islas Canarias	Tarmac	ERC Junior Round 5

== Teams and drivers ==
=== ERC ===
Entries
Constructor	Car	Entrant	Tyre	Drivers	Co-drivers	Rounds
Volkswagen	Volkswagen Polo GTI R5	(Italy) Loran	P	(Italy) Giandomenico Basso	(Italy) Lorenzo Granai	1
Volkswagen	Volkswagen Polo GTI R5	(Hungary) MOL Racing Team	P	(Hungary) Norbert Herczig	(Hungary) Ramón Ferencz	1, 3–4
Volkswagen	Volkswagen Polo GTI R5	(Italy) PA Racing (Note: Entered under driver's name.)	P	(Sweden) Oliver Solberg	(Republic of Ireland) Aaron Johnston	1–3, 5
Volkswagen	Volkswagen Polo GTI R5	(Italy) PA Racing	P	(Italy) Enrico Brazzoli	(Italy) Maurizio Barone	1
Volkswagen	Volkswagen Polo GTI R5	(Germany) Pole Promotion	P	(Germany) Fabian Kreim	(Germany) Frank Christian	1
Volkswagen	Volkswagen Polo GTI R5	(Italy) Gass Racing srl	P	(Italy) Alessandro Re	(Italy) Marco Menchini	1
Volkswagen	Volkswagen Polo GTI R5	(Cyprus) Galatariotis Rally Team	P	(Cyprus) Simos Galatariotis	(Cyprus) Antonis Ioannou	2
Volkswagen	Volkswagen Polo GTI R5	(Hungary) Turán Motorsport SE	HK	(Hungary) Frigyes Turán	(Hungary) László Bagaméri	4
Citroën	Citroën C3 R5	(France) Saintéloc Junior Team	P	(Russia) Alexey Lukyanuk	(Russia) Dmitry Eremeev	1-4
Citroën	Citroën C3 R5	(France) Saintéloc Junior Team	P	(Russia) Alexey Lukyanuk	(Russia) Alexey Arnautov	5
Citroën	Citroën C3 R5	(France) Saintéloc Junior Team	P	(United States) Sean Johnston	(United States) Alex Kihurani	2
Citroën	Citroën C3 R5	(France) Saintéloc Junior Team	MI	(Germany) Marijan Griebel	(Germany) Pirmin Winklhofer	1, 5
Citroën	Citroën C3 R5	(France) Saintéloc Junior Team	MI	(Germany) Marijan Griebel	(Germany) Tobias Braun	3–4
Citroën	Citroën C3 R5	(Italy) F.P.F. Sport	P	(Italy) Andrea Crugnola	(Italy) Pietro Ometto	1
Citroën	Citroën C3 R5	(Italy) F.P.F. Sport	P	(Italy) Antonio Rusce	(Italy) Sauro Farnocchia	1
Citroën	Citroën C3 R5	Rally Team Spain	P	(Spain) Efrén Llarena	(Spain) Sara Fernández	All
Citroën	Citroën C3 R5	Rally Team Spain	P	(Spain) Pepe López	(Spain) Borja Rozada	5
Citroën	Citroën C3 R5	(Portugal) Sports & You	MI	(Belgium) Guillaume de Mevius	(Belgium) Martijn Wydaeghe	3
Citroën	Citroën C3 R5	Citroen Rally Team Hungary	P	(Hungary) Csucsu	(Hungary) Imre Tóth	4
Citroën	Citroën C3 R5	Citroen Rally Team Hungary	P	(Romania) Simone Tempestini	(Romania) Sergiu Itu	5
Citroën	Citroën C3 R5	(France) CHL Sport Auto	MI	(France) Yoann Bonato	(France) Benjamin Boulloud	3-5
Citroën	Citroën C3 R5	(Spain) Auto Laca Competicion	MI	(Spain) Luis Monzón	(Spain) Jose Carlos Deniz	5
Citroën	Citroën C3 R5	(Spain) C.D. Todo Sport	P	(Spain) Emma Falcon	(Spain) Candido Carrera	5
Skoda	Škoda Fabia R5 Evo	(Czech Republic) ACCR Czech Rally Team	MI	(Czech Republic) Filip Mareš	(Czech Republic) Radovan Bucha	1
Skoda	Škoda Fabia R5 Evo	(Austria) BRR Baumschlager Rallye & Racing Team	P	(Germany) Albert von Thurn und Taxis	(Austria) Bernhard Ettel	1, 3–5
Skoda	Škoda Fabia R5 Evo	(Poland) Orlen Team	MI	(Poland) Miko Marczyk	(Poland) Szymon Gospodarczyk	All
Skoda	Škoda Fabia R5 Evo	(India) Team MRF Tyres	MR	(Finland) Emil Lindholm	(Finland) Mikael Korhonen	1–4
Skoda	Škoda Fabia R5 Evo	(Germany) Brose Motorsport	P	(Germany) Dominik Dinkel	(Austria) Ursula Mayrhofer	1–2, 4
Skoda	Škoda Fabia R5 Evo	(Germany) Brose Motorsport	P	(Germany) Dominik Dinkel	(Germany) Michael Wenzel	3
Skoda	Škoda Fabia R5 Evo	(Italy) Delta Rally	P	(Italy) Alberto Battistolli	(Italy) Simone Scattolin	1
Skoda	Škoda Fabia R5 Evo	(Italy) DP Autosport	P	(Italy) Damiano De Tommaso	(San Marino) Massimo Bizzocchi	1
Skoda	Škoda Fabia R5 Evo	(Slovenia) Lema Racing-AS2005	P	(Slovenia) Bostjan Avbelj	(Slovenia) Damijan Andrejka	1
Skoda	Škoda Fabia R5 Evo	(Latvia) Sports Racing Technologies	MI	(Estonia) Raul Jeets	(Estonia) Andrus Toom	2
Skoda	Škoda Fabia R5 Evo	(Finland) TGS Worldwide	P	(Finland) Mikko Heikkilä	(Finland) Henri Arpiainen	2
Skoda	Škoda Fabia R5 Evo	Eurosol Racing Team Hungary	P	(Sweden) Oliver Solberg	(Republic of Ireland) Aaron Johnston	4
Skoda	Škoda Fabia R5 Evo	(Hungary) Topp-Cars Rally Team	P	(Norway) Andreas Mikkelsen	(Norway) Ola Fløene	4
Skoda	Škoda Fabia R5 Evo	(Hungary) Topp-Cars Rally Team	P	(Norway) Andreas Mikkelsen	(Norway) Anders Jæger	5
Skoda	Škoda Fabia R5 Evo	(Hungary) Pilis Racing Kft. / Dani Fischer Team	P	(Hungary) Vincze Ferenc	(Slovakia) Igor Bacigál	4
Skoda	Škoda Fabia R5 Evo	Gulf Racing Hungary	P	(Hungary) Ádám Velenczei	(Hungary) Tamás Szőke	4
Skoda	Škoda Fabia R5 Evo	(Portugal) The Racing Factory / ETS Racing Fuels	MI	(Austria) Simon Wagner	(Austria) Gerald Winter	4
Skoda	Škoda Fabia R5 Evo	(Spain) Recalvi Team	MI	(Spain) Jose Antonio Suarez	(Spain) Alberto Iglesias	5
Skoda	Škoda Fabia R5 Evo	(Spain) Team Vito Škoda	MI	(Spain) Nil Solans	(Spain) Marc Martí	5
Skoda	Škoda Fabia R5	(Hungary) Tagai Racing Technology	P	(Romania) Simone Tempestini	(Romania) Sergiu Itu	1
Skoda	Škoda Fabia R5	(Italy) Specialcar	P	(Italy) Giacomo Scattolon	(Italy) Matteo Nobili	1
Skoda	Škoda Fabia R5	(Italy) Delta Rally	P	(Italy) Alberto Battistolli	(Italy) Simone Scattolin	2
Skoda	Škoda Fabia R5	(Finland) TGS Worldwide	P	(Finland) Eerik Pietarinen	(Finland) Antti Linnaketo	2
Skoda	Škoda Fabia R5	(Portugal) The Racing Factory / ETS Racing Fuels	MI	(Portugal) Aloísio Monteiro	(Portugal) Sancho Eiró	3
Hyundai	Hyundai i20 R5	(Republic of Ireland) Motorsport Ireland Rally Academy	P	(Republic of Ireland) Callum Devine	(Republic of Ireland) Brian Hoy	1–2
Hyundai	Hyundai i20 R5	(Republic of Ireland) Motorsport Ireland Rally Academy	P	(Republic of Ireland) Callum Devine	(Republic of Ireland) James Fulton	3–5
Hyundai	Hyundai i20 R5	(Republic of Ireland) Motorsport Ireland Rally Academy	P	(Republic of Ireland) Pauric Duffy	(Republic of Ireland) Jeff Case	3, 5
Hyundai	Hyundai i20 R5	(Republic of Ireland) Motorsport Ireland Rally Academy	MI	(Republic of Ireland) Josh McErlean	(United Kingdom) Keaton Williams	4–5
Hyundai	Hyundai i20 R5	(India) Team MRF Tyres	MR	(Republic of Ireland) Craig Breen	(Republic of Ireland) Paul Nagle	All
Hyundai	Hyundai i20 R5	(South Korea) Hyundai Motorsport N	P	(Luxembourg) Grégoire Munster	(Belgium) Louis Louka	All
Hyundai	Hyundai i20 R5	(South Korea) Hyundai Motorsport N	P	(Russia) Nikolay Gryazin	(Russia) Konstantin Aleksandrov	2, 4
Hyundai	Hyundai i20 R5	(Spain) Hyundai Ares Racing Team	P	(Spain) Iván Ares	(Spain) David Vázquez	3, 5
Hyundai	Hyundai i20 R5	(Spain) Hyundai Motor España	P	(Spain) Surhayen Pernía	(Spain) Eduardo González	3, 5
Hyundai	Hyundai i20 R5	(Spain) Hyundai Motor España	P	(Spain) Francisco López	(Spain) Borja Odriozola	3, 5
Hyundai	Hyundai i20 R5	(Spain) Hyundai Canarias Motorsport	MI	(Spain) Yeray Lemes	(Spain) Rogelio Penate	5
Ford	Ford Fiesta R5 Mk. II	(Austria) Drift Company Rally Team	P	(Austria) Niki Mayr-Melnhof	(Austria) Leopold Welsersheimb	All
Ford	Ford Fiesta R5 Mk. II	(Czech Republic) Yacco ACCR Team	MI	(Czech Republic) Erik Cais	(Czech Republic) Jindřiška Žáková	All
Ford	Ford Fiesta R5 Mk. II	(United Kingdom) M-Sport Ford World Rally Team	MI	(France) Adrien Fourmaux	(Belgium) Renaud Jamoul	1, 5
Ford	Ford Fiesta R5 Mk. II	(Poland) Plon Rally Team	P	(Poland) Jarosław Kołtun	(Poland) Ireneusz Pleskot	1
Ford	Ford Fiesta R5 Mk. II	(Hungary) DVTK SE	P	(Hungary) András Hadik	(Hungary) Krisztián Kertész	4
Ford	Ford Fiesta R5 Mk. II	(Spain) Copi Sport	P	(Spain) Enrique Cruz	(Spain) Yeray Mujica	5
Ford	Ford Fiesta R5	(Poland) C-Rally	P	(Poland) Adam Stec	(Poland) Kamil Kozdroń	1

=== ERC 2 ===
Entries
Constructor	Car	Entrant	Tyre	Drivers	Co-drivers	Rounds	
Mitsubishi	Mitsubishi Lancer Evo X	(Russia) Prospeed	P	(Russia) Dmitry Feofanov	(Latvia) Nurmonds Kokins	All	
Mitsubishi	Mitsubishi Lancer Evo X	(Hungary) Erdi Team Kft.	P	(Hungary) Tibor Erdi	(Hungary) Szavolcs Kovacs	2–5	
Mitsubishi	Mitsubishi Lancer Evo X	(Poland) PGS Rally Team	P	(Poland) Igor Widłak	(Poland) Lukasz Wloch	1–2	
Mitsubishi	Mitsubishi Lancer Evo X	(Latvia) Sporta klubs Autostils Rally Team	P	(Latvia) Ainars Igavens		2	
Porsche	Porsche 997	(Czech Republic) Petr Nesetril	P	(Czech Republic) Petr Nesetril		1	
Abarth	Fiat Abarth 124 Rally RGT	(Italy) Napoca Rally Academy	P	(Italy) Andrea Mabellini		All	A Cup
Abarth	Fiat Abarth 124 Rally RGT	(Poland) Rallytechnology	P	(Poland) Dariusz Poloński		1-2, 5	A Cup
Abarth	Fiat Abarth 124 Rally RGT	(Italy) Roberto Gobbin	P	(Italy) Roberto Gobbin		1, 3-4	A Cup
Abarth	Fiat Abarth 124 Rally RGT	(Czech Republic) Martin Rada	P	(Czech Republic) Martin Rada		2, 4	A Cup
Abarth	Fiat Abarth 124 Rally RGT	(Romania) Minhea Muresan	P	(Romania) Minhea Muresan		4	A Cup
Alpine	Alpine A110	(Italy) Zelindo Melegari	P	(Italy) Zelindo Melegari		3, 5	
Subaru	Subaru Impreza	(Italy) Zelindo Melegari	P	(Italy) Zelindo Melegari		1-2, 4	

== Results and standings ==
=== Season summary ===
Round	Event	Winning driver	Winning co-driver	Winning entrant	Winning time	Report	Ref.
1	(Italy) Rally di Roma Capitale	(Russia) Alexey Lukyanuk	(Russia) Dmitriy Eremeev	(France) Saintéloc Junior Team	1:58:57.0	Report	
2	(Latvia) Rally Liepāja	(Sweden) Oliver Solberg	(Republic of Ireland) Aaron Johnston	(Sweden) Oliver Solberg	1:27:23.0	Report	
3	(Portugal) Rally Fafe Montelongo	(Russia) Alexey Lukyanuk	(Russia) Dmitriy Eremeev	(France) Saintéloc Junior Team	1:45:52.5	Report	
4	Rally Hungary	(Norway) Andreas Mikkelsen	(Norway) Ola Fløene	(Hungary) Topp-Cars Rally Team	1:48:31.1	Report	
5	(Spain) Rally Islas Canarias	(France) Adrien Fourmaux	(Belgium) Renaud Jamoul	(United Kingdom) M-Sport Ford WRT	2:12:21.2	Report	

=== Scoring system ===
Only the four best results out of the five rounds counted towards the championship. Points for final position were awarded as in following table:

Position	1st	2nd	3rd	4th	5th	6th	7th	8th	9th	10th	11th	12th	13th	14th	15th
Points	30	24	21	19	17	15	13	11	9	7	5	4	3	2	1

Bonus points awarded for position in each Leg:

Position	1st	2nd	3rd	4th	5th
Points	5	4	3	2	1

=== Drivers' Championships ===
==== ERC ====
Pos	Driver	ITA (Italy)	LAT (Latvia)	PRT (Portugal)	HUN (Hungary)	ESP (Spain)	Points	Best 4
1	(Russia) Alexey Lukyanuk	1^{30+8}	2^{24+8}	1^{30+8}	13^{3+5}	7^{13}	129	121
2	(Sweden) Oliver Solberg	3^{21+5}	1^{30+10}	23	4^{19+4}	4^{19+4}	112	112
3	(Luxembourg) Grégoire Munster	7^{13}	6^{15}	3^{21+7}	2^{24+3}	18^{0+1}	84	83
4	(Spain) Iván Ares			2^{24+9}		3^{21+5}	59	59
5	(Norway) Andreas Mikkelsen				1^{30+5}	6^{15+2}	52	52
6	(Spain) Efrén Llarena	6^{15}	8^{11}	Ret	3^{21+3}	20	50	50
7	(Republic of Ireland) Craig Breen	4^{19}	4^{19+2}	16^{0+3}	Ret^{0+4}	11^{5}	52	49
8	(Poland) Mikołaj Marczyk	10^{7}	12^{4+2}	4^{19+2}	15^{1}	9^{9}	44	43
9	(France) Adrien Fourmaux	Ret				1^{30+7}	37	37
10	(Hungary) Norbert Herczig	32		5^{17+2}	6^{15+2}		36	36
11	(Czech Republic) Erik Cais	37	11^{5}	6^{15+2}	8^{11+3}	34	36	36
12	(Republic of Ireland) Callum Devine	Ret	Ret	8^{11}	7^{13}	8^{11}	35	35
13	(France) Yoann Bonato				14^{2}	2^{24+7}	33	33
14	(Italy) Giandomenico Basso	2^{24+8}					32	32
15	(Finland) Emil Lindholm	9^{9}	5^{17+1}	Ret	19		27	27
16	(Austria) Niki Mayr-Melnhof	23	14^{2}	11^{5}	5^{17+1}	16	25	25
17	(Finland) Eerik Pietarinen		3^{21+3}				24	24
18	(Germany) Dominik Dinkel	13^{3}	13^{3}	7^{13}	12^{4}		23	23
19	(Romania) Simone Tempestini	5^{17+2}				14^{2}	21	21
20	(Germany) Marijan Griebel	15^{1}		10^{7}	9^{9}	13^{3}	20	20
21	(Spain) José Antonio Suárez					5^{17+1}	18	18
22	(Finland) Mikko Heikkilä		7^{13}				13	13
23	(Spain) Surhayen Pernía			9^{9}		12^{4}	13	13
24	(Czech Republic) Filip Mareš	8^{11+1}					12	12
25	(United States) Sean Johnston		9^{9+1}				10	10
26	(Estonia) Raul Jeets		10^{7}				7	7
27	(Hungary) András Hadik				10^{7}		7	7
28	(Spain) Luis Monzón					10^{7}	7	7
29	(Germany) Albert von Thurn und Taxis	14^{2}		12^{4}	16	Ret	6	6
30	(Republic of Ireland) Josh McErlean				11^{5}	19	5	5
31	(Italy) Andrea Crugnola	38^{0+5}					5	5
32	(Italy) Alessandro Re	11^{5}					5	5
33	(Italy) Antonio Rusce	12^{4}					4	4
34	(Russia) Nikolay Gryazin		20^{0+3}				3	3
35	(Spain) Francisco Antonio López			18^{0+2}		Ret	2	2
36	(Estonia) Ken Torn	18	15^{1}	14	18	21	1	1
37	(Spain) Enrique Cruz					15^{1}	1	1
38	(Portugal) Aloísio Monteiro			19^{0+1}			1	1
39	(Germany) Fabian Kreim	Ret^{0+1}					1	1

Key
Colour	Result
Gold	Winner
Silver	2nd place
Bronze	3rd place
Green	Points finish
Blue	Non-points finish
Blue	Non-classified finish (NC)
Purple	Did not finish (Ret)
Black	Excluded (EX)
Black	Disqualified (DSQ)
White	Did not start (DNS)
White	Cancelled (C)
Blank	Withdrew entry from the event (WD)
