= Škoda Fabia R5/Rally2 evo =

Škoda R5/Rally2 rally car

Škoda Fabia Rally2 evo
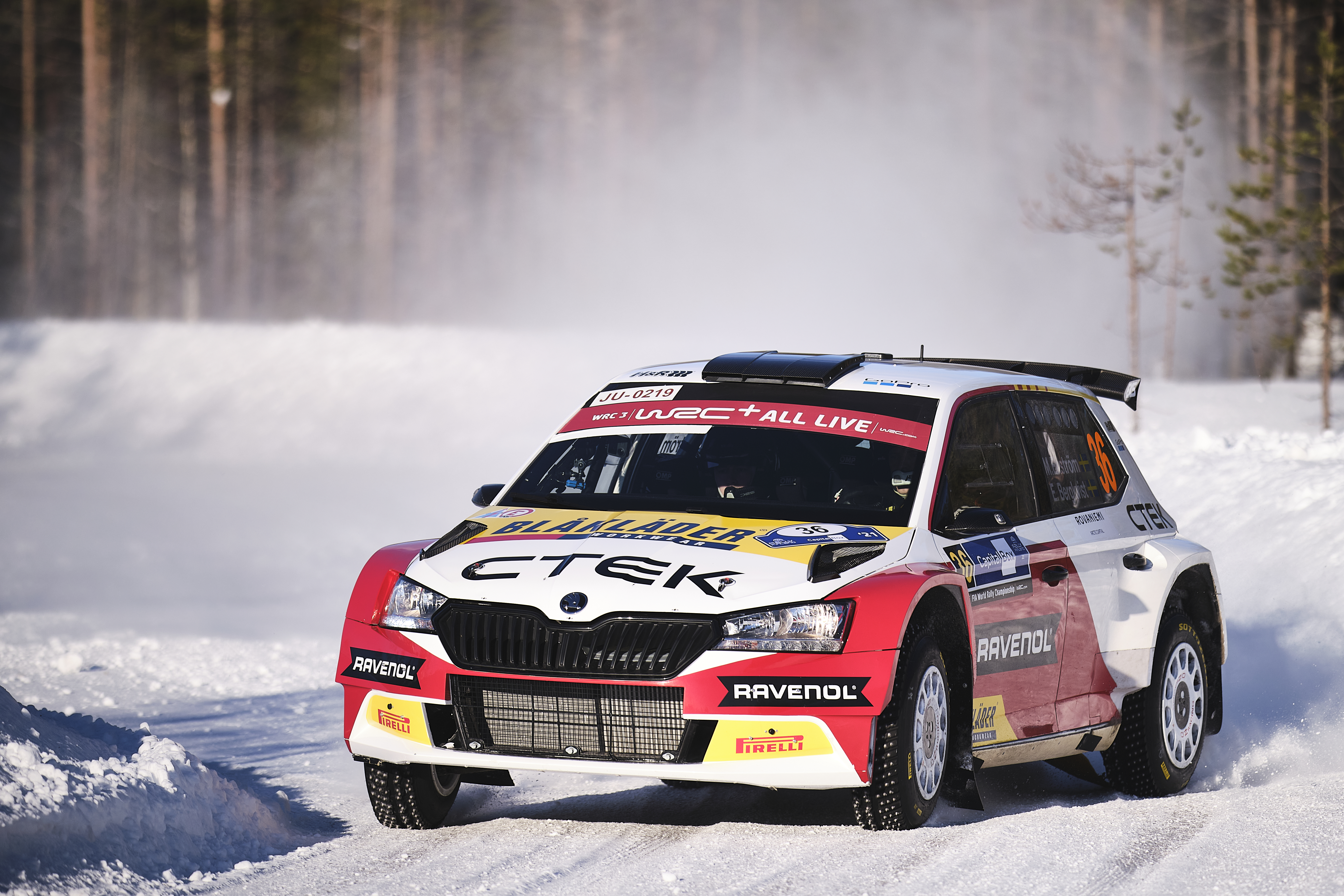
- A Škoda Fabia Rally2 evo driven by Mattias Ekström at the 2021 Arctic Rally Finland
- Category: Group Rally2
- Constructor: Škoda Motorsport
- Designers: Aleš Rada (Technical Director, Škoda Motorsport)
- Homologation: 1 April 2019
- Predecessor: Škoda Fabia R5
- Successor: Škoda Fabia RS Rally2

Technical specifications
- Length: 3,999 mm (157.4 in)
- Width: 1,820 mm (71.7 in)
- Engine: VW EA888 1.6 L (98 cu in) 4-cylinder, 16-valve turbocharged
- Transmission: 5-speed sequential 4-wheel drive
- Weight: 1,230 kg (2,711.7 lb)

Competition history
- Notable entrants: (Czech Republic) Škoda Motorsport
- Notable drivers: World Rally Championship-2 Pro: (Czech Republic) Jan Kopecký (Finland) Kalle Rovanperä
- Debut: World Rally Championship-2 Pro: (Portugal) 2019 Rally de Portugal; Czech Rally Championship: (Czech Republic) 2019 Rallye Český Krumlov
- First win: World Rally Championship-2 Pro: (Portugal) 2019 Rally de Portugal; Czech Rally Championship: (Czech Republic) 2019 Rallye Český Krumlov
- Teams' Championships: 1 (Toksport, 2020)

The Škoda Fabia Rally2 evo (former name prior to 2019 rule changes was R5 evo) is a rally car built by Škoda Motorsport. It is an upgraded generational update of the original Fabia R5, based on the facelifted Škoda Fabia production car. After four years of success in the R5 discipline with the original Fabia, Škoda announced the Fabia R5 evo at the Geneva Motor Show in March 2019. The car was showcased as an improvement over the 2015 Fabia in nearly all areas, most notably the power and response of the engine. After many kilometers of testing, The Evo passed international homologation on the 1st of April 2019, and made its competitive rallying debut in the hands of Jan Kopecký at the third round of the Czech Rally Championship, Rallye Český Krumlov. The car would make a successful first impression, winning the rally overall. Soon after it would make its World Rally Championship debut at Rally de Portugal, where it would once again emerge victorious in the hands of Kalle Rovanperä.

== Rally victories ==
=== World Rally Championship-2 Pro ===
Year	No.	Event	Surface	Driver	Co-driver
2019	1	2019 Rally de Portugal	Gravel	(Finland) Kalle Rovanperä	(Finland) Jonne Halttunen
2019	2	(Italy) 2019 Rally Italia Sardegna	Gravel	(Finland) Kalle Rovanperä	(Finland) Jonne Halttunen
2019	3	2019 Rally Finland	Gravel	(Finland) Kalle Rovanperä	(Finland) Jonne Halttunen
2019	4	(Germany) 2019 Rallye Deutschland	Tarmac	(Czech Republic) Jan Kopecký	(Czech Republic) Pavel Dresler
2019	5	(United Kingdom) 2019 Wales Rally GB	Gravel	(Finland) Kalle Rovanperä	(Finland) Jonne Halttunen

=== World Rally Championship-2 ===
Year	No.	Event	Surface	Driver	Co-driver
2019	1	(Germany) 2019 Rallye Deutschland	Tarmac	(Germany) Fabian Kreim	(Germany) Tobias Braun
2020	2	2020 Rally Mexico	Gravel	(Sweden) Pontus Tidemand	(Sweden) Patrik Barth
2020	3	2020 Rally Turkey	Gravel	(Sweden) Pontus Tidemand	(Sweden) Patrik Barth
2020	4	(Italy) 2020 Rally Italia Sardegna	Gravel	(Sweden) Pontus Tidemand	(Sweden) Patrik Barth
2021	5	(Monaco) 2021 Monte Carlo Rally	Mixed	(Norway) Andreas Mikkelsen	(Norway) Ola Fløene
2021	6	2021 Rally Estonia	Gravel	(Norway) Andreas Mikkelsen	(Norway) Ola Fløene
2021	7	(Greece) 2021 Acropolis Rally	Gravel	(Norway) Andreas Mikkelsen	(United Kingdom) Elliott Edmondson
2022	8	(Monaco) 2022 Monte Carlo Rally	Mixed	(Norway) Andreas Mikkelsen	(Norway) Torstein Eriksen
2022	9	2022 Rally Sweden	Snow	(Norway) Andreas Mikkelsen	(Norway) Torstein Eriksen
2022	10	(Italy) 2022 Rally Italia Sardegna	Gravel	(Authorised Neutral Athletes) Nikolay Gryazin (Note: Nikolay Gryazin is Russian, but he competed as a neutral competitor using the ANA flag as Russian national emblems were banned by the association due to the Russian invasion of Ukraine.)	(Authorised Neutral Athletes) Konstantin Aleksandrov (Note: Konstantin Aleksandrov is Russian, but he competed as a neutral competitor using the ANA flag as Russian national emblems were banned by the association due to the Russian invasion of Ukraine.)
2022	11	(Kenya) 2022 Safari Rally	Gravel	(Poland) Kajetan Kajetanowicz	(Poland) Maciej Szczepaniak
2022	12	2022 Rally Estonia	Gravel	(Norway) Andreas Mikkelsen	(Norway) Torstein Eriksen
2022	13	2022 Rally Finland	Gravel	(Finland) Emil Lindholm	(Finland) Reeta Hämäläinen
2022	14	(Greece) 2022 Acropolis Rally	Gravel	(Finland) Emil Lindholm	(Finland) Reeta Hämäläinen
2023	15	(Kenya) 2023 Safari Rally	Gravel	(Poland) Kajetan Kajetanowicz	(Poland) Maciej Szczepaniak

=== World Rally Championship-3 ===
Year	No.	Event	Surface	Driver	Co-driver
2020	1	2020 Rally Turkey	Gravel	(Poland) Kajetan Kajetanowicz	(Poland) Maciej Szczepaniak
2020	2	(Italy) 2020 Rally Monza	Tarmac	(Norway) Andreas Mikkelsen	(Norway) Anders Jæger
2021	3	(Finland) 2021 Arctic Rally	Snow	(Finland) Teemu Asunmaa	(Finland) Marko Salminen
2021	4	2021 Croatia Rally	Tarmac	(Poland) Kajetan Kajetanowicz	(Poland) Maciej Szczepaniak
2021	5	2021 Rally de Portugal	Gravel	(Poland) Kajetan Kajetanowicz	(Poland) Maciej Szczepaniak
2021	6	2021 Rally Estonia	Gravel	Alexey Lukyanuk (Note: Alexey Lukyanuk is Russian, but he competes as a neutral competitor using the designation RAF (Russian Automobile Federation), as the Court of Arbitration for Sport upheld a ban on Russia competing at World Championships. The ban was implemented by the World Anti-Doping Agency in response to state-sponsored doping program of Russian athletes.)	Yaroslav Fedorov (Note: Yaroslav Fedorov is Russian, but he competes as a neutral competitor using the designation RAF (Russian Automobile Federation), as the Court of Arbitration for Sport upheld a ban on Russia competing at World Championships. The ban was implemented by the World Anti-Doping Agency in response to state-sponsored doping program of Russian athletes.)
2021	7	(Greece) 2021 Acropolis Rally	Gravel	(Poland) Kajetan Kajetanowicz	(Poland) Maciej Szczepaniak
2021	8	2021 Rally Finland	Gravel	(Finland) Emil Lindholm	(Finland) Reeta Hämäläinen
2021	9	(Spain) 2021 Rally Catalunya	Tarmac	(Finland) Emil Lindholm (Note: Reeta Hämäläinen appears as the driver on official documents.)	(Finland) Reeta Hämäläinen (Note: Emil Lindholm appears as the co-driver on official documents.)

=== European Rally Championship ===
Year	No.	Event	Surface	Driver	Co-driver
2019	1	(Czech Republic) 2019 Barum Czech Rally Zlín	Tarmac	(Czech Republic) Jan Kopecký	(Czech Republic) Pavel Dresler
2020	2	2020 Rally Hungary	Tarmac	(Norway) Andreas Mikkelsen	(Norway) Ola Fløene
2021	3	(Italy) 2021 Rally di Roma Capitale	Tarmac	(Italy) Giandomenico Basso	(Italy) Lorenzo Granai
2021	4	(Czech Republic) 2021 Barum Czech Rally Zlín	Tarmac	(Czech Republic) Jan Kopecký	(Czech Republic) Jan Hloušek
2021	5	(Portugal) 2021 Azores Rallye	Gravel	(Norway) Andreas Mikkelsen	(United Kingdom) Elliott Edmondson
2021	6	(Portugal) 2021 Rally Serras de Fafe e Felgueiras	Gravel	(Norway) Andreas Mikkelsen	(United Kingdom) Elliott Edmondson
2022	7	(Portugal) 2022 Azores Rallye	Gravel	(Spain) Efrén Llarena	(Spain) Sara Fernández
2022	8	2022 Rally Poland	Gravel	(Poland) Mikołaj Marczyk	(Poland) Szymon Gospodarczyk
2022	9	(Latvia) 2022 Rally Liepāja	Gravel	(Latvia) Mārtiņš Sesks	(Latvia) Renārs Francis
2022	10	(Italy) 2022 Rally di Roma Capitale	Tarmac	(Italy) Damiano De Tommaso	(Italy) Giorgia Ascalone
2022	11	(Czech Republic) 2022 Barum Czech Rally Zlín	Tarmac	(Czech Republic) Jan Kopecký	(Czech Republic) Jan Hloušek
