= Rally Liepāja =

Latvian rally competition

Rally Liepaja
- Status: active
- Genre: motorsporting event
- Frequency: annual
- Location: Liepāja
- Country: Latvia
- Years active: 11
- Inaugurated: 2013
- Website: www.lvrally.com/en

The Rally Liepāja is an international rallying event that travels northwards along the coastline of the Baltic Sea from Liepāja to Ventspils in Latvia. The event is a round of the European Rally Championship and the Latvian Rally Championship.

== History ==
The rally was run for the first time in 2013 as the first international auto racing event to be held in Latvia since gaining independence from the Soviet Union in 1991 and just the second motorsport event after the motorcycle Speedway Grand Prix of Latvia.

Originally the rally was designed as a snow rally and unlike its neighbour in the ERC calendar, the Jänner Rallye, was not a tarmac based event but a traditional snow rally similar to events like Rally Sweden.The inaugural event was won by Finnish driver Jari Ketomaa driving a Ford Fiesta RRC in a one-off appearance for the British Autotek Motorsport team in the European Rally Championship.

In 2016 the rally was moved to a September date, becoming a gravel rally, before settling into October in 2017.

The rally joined the World Rally Championship calendar as Rally Latvia in 2024.

== Winners ==
Sourced from:

Year	Winner	Car
2013	(Finland) Jari Ketomaa	Ford Fiesta RRC
2014	(Finland) Esapekka Lappi	Škoda Fabia S2000
2015	(Republic of Ireland) Craig Breen	Peugeot 208 T16 R5
2016	(Latvia) Ralfs Sirmacis	Škoda Fabia R5
2017	(Russia) Nikolay Gryazin	Škoda Fabia R5
2018	(Russia) Nikolay Gryazin	Škoda Fabia R5
2019	(Sweden) Oliver Solberg	Volkswagen Polo GTI R5
2020	(Sweden) Oliver Solberg	Volkswagen Polo GTI R5
2021	(Latvia) Nikolay Gryazin	Volkswagen Polo GTI R5
2022	(Latvia) Mārtiņš Sesks	Škoda Fabia Rally2 evo
2023	(Latvia) Mārtiņš Sesks	Škoda Fabia RS Rally2
2024†	(Finland) Kalle Rovanperä	Toyota GR Yaris Rally1

† — Rally was part of the World Rally Championship.
