= Rally di Roma Capitale =

Annual rallying event in Italy

- Logo of the 2017 edition
- Status: Active
- Genre: Motorsporting event
- Date: July (since 2018)
- Frequency: Annual
- Location: Rome
- Country: Italy
- Inaugurated: 2013

Rally di Roma Capitale is an annual rallying event held since 2013 in Rome, Italy. Since 2017, it is part of the European Rally Championship, before becoming part of the World Rally Championship in 2027.

== Winners ==
Year	Driver	Co-driver	Car	Category
2013	(Italy) Alfredo De Dominicis	(Italy) Matteo Chiarcossi	Ford Focus RS WRC	
2014	(Italy) Tonino Di Cosimo	(Italy) Mario Papa	Ford Focus RS WRC	
2015	(Italy) Umberto Scandola	(Italy) Guido D'Amore	Škoda Fabia R5	CIR
2016	(Italy) Umberto Scandola	(Italy) Guido D'Amore	Škoda Fabia R5	CIR
2017	(France) Bryan Bouffier	(France) Xavier Panseri	Ford Fiesta R5	ERC, CIR
2018	(Russia) Alexey Lukyanuk	(Russia) Alexey Arnautov	Ford Fiesta R5	ERC, CIR
2019	(Italy) Giandomenico Basso	(Italy) Lorenzo Granai	Škoda Fabia R5	ERC, CIR
2020	(Russia) Alexey Lukyanuk	(Russia) Dmitriy Eremeev	Citroën C3 R5	ERC, CIR
2021	(Italy) Giandomenico Basso	(Italy) Lorenzo Granai	Škoda Fabia Rally2 evo	ERC, CIR
2022	(Italy) Damiano De Tommaso	(Italy) Giorgia Ascalone	Škoda Fabia Rally2 evo	ERC, CIR
2023	(Italy) Andrea Crugnola	(Italy) Pietro Elia Ometto	Citroën C3 Rally2	ERC, CIR
2024	(Italy) Andrea Crugnola	(Italy) Pietro Elia Ometto	Citroën C3 Rally2	ERC, CIR
2025	(Italy) Giandomenico Basso	(Italy) Lorenzo Granai	Škoda Fabia RS Rally2	ERC, CIR
2026				ERC, CIR
2027				WRC
