= Rally Hungary =

Hungarian rally competition

- Status: active
- Genre: motorsporting event
- Date: May
- Frequency: annual
- Locations: Veszprém, Transdanubian Mountains
- Country: Hungary
- Inaugurated: 2018
- Founder: National Automobilsport Federation of Hungary
- Website: rallyhungary.com

Rally Hungary is a rally event that has been held in Nyíregyháza, Zemplén Mountains and Máriapócs until 2023. Since 2024 the rally set place in Veszprém and the Transdanubian Mountains. The rally was organized for the first time in 2018 under the name of Nyíregyháza Rally, it consisted of 17 stages and 223 km of route, the first and only edition of this rally was won by the local András Hadik.

In 2019, already like the Rally Hungary, the event was selected as a round of the European Rally Championship, replacing the Acropolis Rally. It was the first Hungarian rally to be part of the European Championship since 2003 (Fehérvár Rally). Another local Frigyes Turán won the first Rally Hungary.

== Winners ==
Year	Rally name	Driver	Co-driver	Car	Championship	Results	Maps
2018	I. Nyíregyháza Rally	(Hungary) András Hadik	(Hungary) Attila Deák	Ford Fiesta R5			
2019	I. Rally Hungary	(Hungary) Frigyes Turán	(Hungary) László Bagaméri	Škoda Fabia R5	ERC		
2020	II. Rally Hungary	(Norway) Andreas Mikkelsen	(Norway) Ola Fløene	Škoda Fabia Rally2 evo	ERC		
2021	III. Rally Hungary	(Norway) Mads Østberg	(Norway) Torstein Eriksen	Citroën C3 Rally2	ERC		
2023	IV. Rally Hungary	(Norway) Mads Østberg	(Sweden) Patrik Barth	Citroën C3 Rally2	ERC		
2024	V. Rally Hungary	(Romania) Simone Tempestini	(Romania) Sergiu Itu	Škoda Fabia RS Rally2	ERC	Report	
2025	VI. Rally Hungary	(Finland) Roope Korhonen	(Finland) Anssi Viinikka	Toyota GR Yaris Rally2	ERC	Report	
