= Rally Serras de Fafe e Felgueiras =

- Inaugural season: 1955
- Drivers' champion: (Spain) Nil Solans
- Co-Drivers' champion: Rallye Team Spain

The Rally Serras de Fafe e Felgueiras (previously known as Rali Serras de Fafe, Rali FC Porto, Rallye às Antas), is a rallying event that takes place annually in Portugal. The rally was held for the first time in 1955 as Rallye às Antas and from 1968 as the Rali às Barragens Norte.

In 2021, the Rally Serras de Fafe e Felgueiras became part of the European Rally Championship. It was going to take place from March 12–14 as the first event of the season, but at the request of the Portuguese Automobile Federation its date was changed to September 23–25. The dates were changed again and it finally took place on October 1–3 as the sixth event of the championship.

The unusually long name for the 2023 event comes from the involvement of the municipalities of Fafe, Felgueiras, Boticas, Vieira do Minho and Cabeceiras de Basto.

The Historic Rally Fafe is a classic rally held since 2025.

== Winners ==
Year	Rally name	Driver	Co-driver	Car	Championship
1955	1. Rallye às Antas	Ernesto Martorell	?	Denzel	
1956	2. Rallye às Antas	António Leitão de Oliveira	?	AC	
1957	3. Rallye às Antas	Abílio Correia Lobo	?	Alfa Romeo	
1958	4. Rallye às Antas	António Leitão de Oliveira	?	AC	
1968	Rali às Barragens Norte	José Bernardino Lampreia	Santos Vilalobos	Renault 8 Gordini	POR
1969	5. Rali às Antas	Mabílio de Albuquerque	Pedro Cameira	Porsche 911	POR
1970	6. Rallye às Antas	Francisco Santos	Silva da Nogueira	Ford Escort Twin Cam	POR
1971	7. Rallye às Antas	Giovanni Salvi	José Arnaud	Porsche 911 L	POR
1972	8. Rallye às Antas	António Carlos Oliveira	Eduardo Bon de Sousa	Datsun 240Z	POR
1973	9. Rali às Antas	Luís Netto	Manuel Coentro	Fiat 124 Spider	POR
1976	10. Rali às Antas	António Diegues	Henrique Alegria	Opel 1904 SR	POR
1977	11. Rali Arbo	Jorge Ortigão	Miguel Sottomayor	Opel 1904 SR	POR
1978	12. Rali Internacional Arbo	Jorge Ortigão	Miguel Sottomayor	Opel 1904 SR	POR
1979	13. Rali Internacional do Futebol Clube do Porto	Mário Silva	José Nobre	Ford Escort RS 1800 MKII	POR
1980	14. Rali Internacional do Futebol Clube do Porto/RAR	Mário Silva	Pedro Almeida	Ford Escort RS 1800 MKII	POR
1981	15. Rali do Futebol Clube do Porto	António Santinho Mendes	Filipe Lopes	Datsun Violet 160J	POR
1982	Rali Internacional Dão Lafões/FC Porto	Joaquim Santos	Miguel Oliveira	Ford Escort RS 1800 MKII	POR
1983	Rali Internacional Dão/Lafões	João Santos	Marques Manuel Almeida	Fiat 131 Abarth	POR
1984	Rali Internacional Serra do Marão	Joaquim Santos	Miguel Oliveira	Ford Escort RS 1800 MKII	POR
1985	Rali Internacional Serra do Marão	Joaquim Moutinho	Edgar Fortes	Renault 5 Tour de Corse	POR
1986	Rallye do Porto	Joaquim Moutinho	Edgar Fortes	Renault 5 Tour de Corse	POR
1987	Rallye do Porto	Manuel Mello Breyner	Alfredo Lavrador	Renault 11 Turbo	POR
1988	1. Rali do Porto	Carlos Bica	Fernando Prata	Lancia Delta HF 4WD	POR
1989	2. Rali do Porto	Carlos Bica	Fernando Prata	Lancia Delta HF 4WD	POR
1990	3. Rali Esso/Futebol Clube do Porto	António Coutinho	Cândido Júnior	Toyota Celica GT-4 (ST165)	POR
1991	4. Rali Esso/Futebol Clube do Porto	Carlos Bica	Fernando Prata	Lancia Delta Integrale 16V	POR
1992	5. Rali Esso/Futebol Clube do Porto	José Miguel	Luís Lisboa	Ford Sierra RS Cosworth 4x4	POR
1993	6. Rali Internacional Esso/FC Porto	José Miguel	António Manuel	Ford Sierra RS Cosworth 4x4	POR
1994	7. Rali Porto Petróleos/FC Porto	Fernando Peres	Ricardo Caldeira	Ford Escort RS Cosworth	POR
1995	8. Rali Porto Petróleos/FC Porto	Fernando Peres	Ricardo Caldeira	Ford Escort RS Cosworth	POR
1996	9. Rali Esso/Futebol Clube do Porto	Fernando Peres	Ricardo Caldeira	Ford Escort RS Cosworth	POR
1997	10. Rali Esso/Futebol Clube do Porto	Fernando Peres	Ricardo Caldeira	Ford Escort RS Cosworth	POR
1998	11. Rali Esso/Futebol Clube do Porto	Adruzilo Lopes	Luís Lisboa	Peugeot 306 Maxi	POR
1999	12. Rally Esso/F.C. Porto	Pedro Matos Chaves	Sérgio Paiva	Toyota Corolla WRC	POR
2000	13. Rally Esso/F.C. Porto	Adruzilo Lopes	Luís Lisboa	Peugeot 206 WRC	POR
2001	14. Rallye F.C. Porto	Rui Madeira	Fernando Prata	Ford Focus RS WRC '01	POR
2002	15. Rallye F.C. Porto	Miguel Campos	Carlos Magalhães	Peugeot 206 WRC	POR
2003	16. Rallye F.C. Porto	Fernando PereS	José Pedro Silva	Ford Escort RS Cosworth	POR
2004	17. Rallye F.C. Porto	Pedro Leal	Luís Ramalho	Mitsubishi Lancer Evo VII	POR
2005	18. Rallye F.C. Porto	Fernando Peres	José Pedro Silva	Mitsubishi Lancer Evo VIII	POR
2006	19. Rallye F.C. Porto	Miguel Campos	Carlos Magalhães	Subaru Impreza STi N12	POR
2007	20. Rallye F.C. Porto	Bruno Magalhães	Paulo Grave	Peugeot 207 S2000	POR
2008	21. Rallye F.C. Porto	Bruno Magalhães	Mário Castro	Peugeot 207 S2000	POR
2009	22. Rallye F.C. Porto	Bruno Magalhães	Carlos Magalhães	Peugeot 207 S2000	POR
2010	23. Rallye Serras de Fafe	Bernardo Sousa	Nuno Rodrigues da Silva	Peugeot 207 S2000	POR
2011	24. Rallye Serras de Fafe	Vitor Lopes	Hugo Magalhães	Subaru Impreza STi N14	POR
2012	25. Rallye Serras de Fafe	Pedro Peres	Tiago Ferreira	Mitsubishi Lancer Evo IX	POR
2013	26. Rallye Serras de Fafe	Bernardo Sousa	Hugo Magalhães	Peugeot 207 S2000	POR
2014	27. Rallye Serras de Fafe	Pedro Meireles	Mário Castro	Škoda Fabia S2000	POR
2015	28. Rallye Serras de Fafe	Ricardo Moura	António Costa	Ford Fiesta R5	POR
2016	29. Rali Serras de Fafe	José Pedro Fontes	Inês Ponte	Citroën DS3 R5	POR
2017	30. Rali Serras de Fafe	Pedro Meireles	Mário Castro	Škoda Fabia R5	POR
2018	31. Rali Serras de Fafe	Ricardo Moura	António Costa	Ford Fiesta R5	POR
2019	32. Rallye Serras de Fafe	Dani Sordo	Carlos del Barrio	Hyundai i20 R5	POR
2020	33. Rallye Serras de Fafe e Felgueiras	Armindo Araújo	Luís Ramalho	Škoda Fabia Rally2 evo	POR
2021	34. Rally Serras de Fafe e Felgueiras	Andreas Mikkelsen	Elliott Edmondson	Škoda Fabia Rally2 evo	ERC, POR
2022	35. Rally Serras de Fafe - Felgueiras - Cabreira e Boticas	Nil Solans	Marc Martí	Volkswagen Polo GTI R5	ERC, POR
2023	36. Rally Serras de Fafe, Felgueiras, Boticas, Vieira do Minho e Cabeceiras de Basto	Hayden Paddon	John Kennard	Hyundai i20 N Rally2	ERC, POR

- POR – Portuguese Rally Championship
- ERC – European Rally Championship
