= 2024 Rally Hungary =

1st round of 2024 European Rally Championship

2024 Rally Hungary V-Híd Rally Hungary 2024
Round 1 of 8 in the 2024 European Rally Championship
Next event →
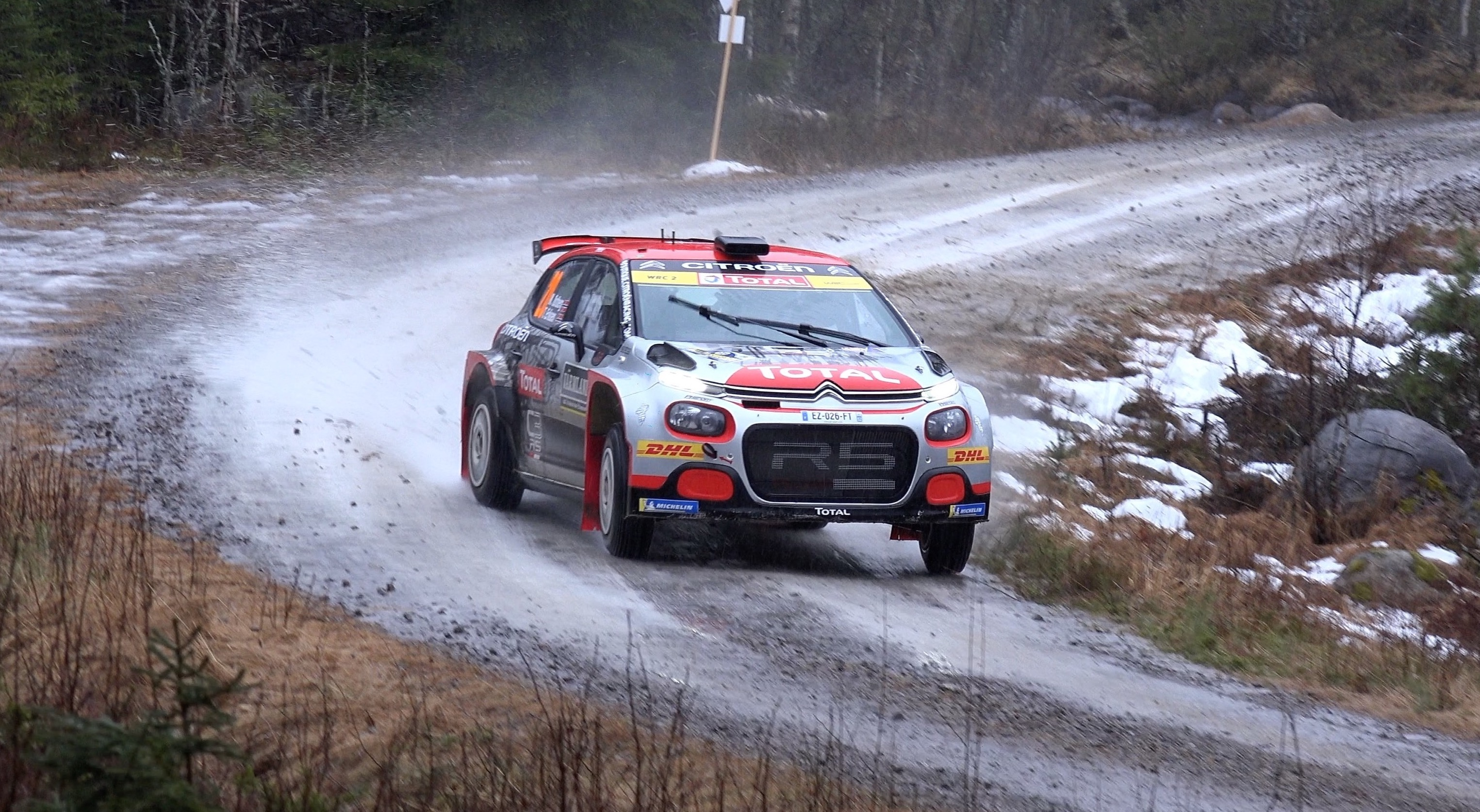
- Mads Østberg won Rally Hungary in 2023
- Host country: Hungary
- Rally base: Veszprém, Veszprém County
- Dates run: 12 – 14 April 2024
- Start location: Királyszentistván, Veszprém County
- Stages: 13 (192.43 km; 119.57 miles)
- Stage surface: Gravel
- Transport distance: 603.31 km (374.88 miles)
- Overall distance: 795.74 km (494.45 miles)

Statistics
- Crews registered: 52
- Crews: 50 at start, 34 at finish

Overall results
- Overall winner: (Romania) Simone Tempestini (Romania) Sergiu Itu; Škoda Fabia RS Rally2; 1:52:50.4

The 2024 Rally Hungary was a motor racing event for rally cars held over three days from 12 to 14 April 2024. It was the first round of the 2024 European Rally Championship. The event was based in Veszprém, and was contested over thirteen stages, covering a total competitive distance of 192.43 km (119.57 mi).

Mads Østberg and Patrik Barth were defending rally winners. Norbert Maior and Francesca Maior were defending rally winners in ERC-4 and Junior ERC.

Simone Tempestini and Sergiu Itu won the rally overall. Filip Kohn and Tom Woodburn won in the ERC-3 category, and Max McRae and Cameron Fair won in the ERC-4 and Junior ERC categories.

== Background ==
A total of 52 entries entered with European Rally Championship eligibility.

Rally2 and R5 entries competing in the European Rally Championship
No.	Driver	Co-Driver	Entrant	Car	Championship eligibility	Tyre
1	(New Zealand) Hayden Paddon	(New Zealand) John Kennard	(Italy) BRC Racing Team	Hyundai i20 N Rally2	Driver, Co-driver, Team	P
2	(Spain) Efrén Llarena	(Spain) Sara Fernández	(India) Team MRF Tyres	Škoda Fabia RS Rally2	Driver, Co-driver, Team	MR
3	(Latvia) Mārtiņš Sesks	(Latvia) Renārs Francis	(India) Team MRF Tyres	Toyota GR Yaris Rally2	Driver, Co-driver, Team	MR
4	(Norway) Mads Østberg	(Sweden) Patrik Barth	(Hungary) TRT Rally Team	Citroën C3 Rally2	Driver, Co-driver, Team	MI
5	(France) Mathieu Franceschi	(France) Andy Malfoy	(France) Mathieu Franceschi	Škoda Fabia RS Rally2	Driver, Co-driver	MI
6	(Czech Republic) Filip Mareš	(Czech Republic) Radovan Bucha	(Czech Republic) ACCR Toyota Dolák	Toyota GR Yaris Rally2	Driver, Co-driver, Team	HK
7	(Austria) Simon Wagner	(Austria) Gerald Winter	Eurosol Racing Team Hungary	Škoda Fabia RS Rally2	Driver, Co-driver, Team	MI
8	(Finland) Mikko Heikkilä	(Finland) Kristian Temonen	(Finland) Mikko Heikkilä	Toyota GR Yaris Rally2	Driver, Co-driver	MI
9	(Hungary) Miklós Csomós	(Hungary) Attila Nagy	(Hungary) HRT Racing Kft.	Škoda Fabia Rally2 evo	Driver, Co-driver, Team	P
10	(Czech Republic) Erik Cais	(Slovakia) Igor Bacigál	(Czech Republic) ACCR Orsák Rally Sport	Škoda Fabia RS Rally2	Driver, Co-driver, Team	MI
11	(Poland) Mikołaj Marczyk	(Poland) Szymon Gospodarczyk	(Poland) Mikołaj Marczyk	Škoda Fabia RS Rally2	Driver, Co-driver	MI
12	(Italy) Andrea Mabellini	(Italy) Virginia Lenzi	(India) Team MRF Tyres	Škoda Fabia RS Rally2	Driver, Co-driver, Team	MR
14	(Romania) Simone Tempestini	(Romania) Sergiu Itu	(Romania) Simone Tempestini	Škoda Fabia RS Rally2	Driver, Co-driver	MI
15	(Hungary) Frigyes Turán	(Hungary) Gábor Zsiros	(Hungary) Turán Motorsport SE	Volkswagen Polo GTI R5	Driver, Co-driver, Team	HK
16	(Hungary) Martin László	(Hungary) Viktor Bán	(Hungary) Topp-Cars Rally Team	Škoda Fabia RS Rally2	Driver, Co-driver, Team	P
17	(Hungary) Gábor Német	(Hungary) Gergely Németh	(Hungary) Kole Média Center Kft.	Škoda Fabia RS Rally2	Driver, Co-driver, Team	P
18	(Republic of Ireland) Jon Armstrong	(Republic of Ireland) Eoin Tracy	(Republic of Ireland) Jon Armstrong	Ford Fiesta Rally2	Driver, Co-driver	P
19	(Romania) Bogdan Cuzma	(Denmark) Ditte Kammersgaard	(Romania) Bogdan Cuzma	Škoda Fabia RS Rally2	Driver, Co-driver	MI
20	(Lithuania) Vladas Jurkevičius	(Lithuania) Aisvydas Paliukėnas	(Lithuania) Eldorado x Humbility Sports	Škoda Fabia Rally2 evo	Driver, Co-driver, Team	P
21	(Hungary) Péter Ranga	(Hungary) János Czakó	(Hungary) Pécsi Sport Nonprofit Zrt.	Škoda Fabia R5	Driver, Co-driver, Team	P
22	(Hungary) András Hadik	(Hungary) István Juhász	(Hungary) SZA Performance Kft.	Ford Fiesta Rally2	Driver, Co-driver, Team	P
23	(Hungary) Róbert Bútor	(Hungary) Róbert Tagai	(Hungary) Dunakanyar Autós SE	Citroën C3 Rally2	Driver, Co-driver, Team	MI
24	(Hungary) Kristóf Klausz	(Hungary) Tamás Papp	(Hungary) Klaus Motorsport	Škoda Fabia Rally2 evo	Driver, Co-driver, Team	P
25	(Hungary) László Bodolai	(Hungary) Attila Deák	(Hungary) SZA Performance Kft.	Ford Fiesta Rally2	Driver, Co-driver, Team	P
26	(Hungary) József Trencsényi	(Hungary) Gábor Verba	(Hungary) Extrém Sport Team Kft.	Škoda Fabia Rally2 evo	Driver, Co-driver, Team	P
27	(Hungary) Sándor Ollé	(Hungary) Rebeka Ollé	(Hungary) Treff-Autóház Kft.	Škoda Fabia R5	Driver, Co-driver, Team	P
28	(United Kingdom) Philip Allen	(United Kingdom) Dale Furniss	(United Kingdom) Philip Allen	Hyundai i20 N Rally2	Driver, Co-driver	P
29	(Italy) Giacomo Costenaro	(United Kingdom) Justin Bardini	(Italy) Giacomo Costenaro	Škoda Fabia Rally2 evo	Driver, Co-driver	MR

Rally3 entries competing in the European Rally Championship-3
No.	Driver	Co-Driver	Entrant	Car	Championship eligibility	Tyre
30	(Poland) Igor Widłak	(Poland) Michał Marczewski	(Poland) Grupa PGS RT	Ford Fiesta Rally3	Driver, Co-driver, Team, Fiesta Rally3 Trophy	P
31	(Czech Republic) Filip Kohn	(United Kingdom) Tom Woodburn	(Czech Republic) Filip Kohn	Ford Fiesta Rally3	Driver, Co-driver, Fiesta Rally3 Trophy	P
32	(Croatia) Martin Ravenščak	(Croatia) Dora Ravenščak	(Croatia) Martin Ravenščak	Ford Fiesta Rally3	Driver, Co-driver, Fiesta Rally3 Trophy	P
33	(Turkey) Kerem Kazaz	(Latvia) Andris Mālnieks	(Turkey) Atölye Kazaz	Ford Fiesta Rally3	Driver, Co-driver, Team, Fiesta Rally3 Trophy	P

Rally4 entries competing in the European Rally Championship-4
No.	Driver	Co-Driver	Entrant	Car	Championship eligibility	Tyre
34	(Germany) Timo Schulz	(Germany) Michael Wenzel	(Germany) ADAC Opel Rallye Junior Team	Opel Corsa Rally4	Driver, Co-driver, Team, Junior ERC	HK
35	(Italy) Mattia Zanin	(Italy) Elia De Guio	(Italy) Mattia Zanin	Peugeot 208 Rally4	Driver, Co-driver, Junior ERC	HK
36	(United Kingdom) Max McRae	(United Kingdom) Cameron Fair	(Hungary) TRT Rally Team	Peugeot 208 Rally4	Driver, Co-driver, Team, Junior ERC	HK
37	(Sweden) Mille Johansson	(Sweden) Johan Grönvall	(Slovenia) IK Sport Racing	Opel Corsa Rally4	Driver, Co-driver, Team, Junior ERC	HK
38	(Estonia) Jaspar Vaher	(Estonia) Sander Pruul	M-Sport Poland	Ford Fiesta Rally4	Driver, Co-driver, Team, Junior ERC	HK
39	(Finland) Leevi Lassila	(Finland) Antti Linnaketo	(Finland) Leevi Lassila	Ford Fiesta Rally4	Driver, Co-driver, Junior ERC	HK
40	(Estonia) Karl-Markus Sei	(Estonia) Martin Leotoots	(Estonia) ALM Motorsport	Peugeot 208 Rally4	Driver, Co-driver, Team, Junior ERC	HK
41	(Sweden) Calle Carlberg	(Norway) Jørgen Eriksen	(Germany) ADAC Opel Rallye Junior Team	Opel Corsa Rally4	Driver, Co-driver, Team, Junior ERC	HK
43	(Germany) Liam Müller	(Germany) Alexander Hirsch	(Germany) Liam Müller	Opel Corsa Rally4	Driver, Co-driver, Junior ERC	HK
44	(Hungary) Patrik Herczig	(Hungary) Kristóf Varga	(Hungary) HRT Racing Kft.	Peugeot 208 Rally4	Driver, Co-driver, Team, Junior ERC	HK
45	(Austria) Alfred Kramer	(Denmark) Jeannette Kvick	(Austria) Alfred Kramer	Peugeot 208 Rally4	Driver, Co-driver, Junior ERC	HK
46	(Czech Republic) Daniel Polášek	(Czech Republic) Zdeněk Omelka	(Czech Republic) Daniel Polášek	Peugeot 208 Rally4	Driver, Co-driver, Junior ERC	HK
47	(Italy) Davide Pesavento	(Italy) Matteo Zaramella	(Italy) Davide Pesavento	Peugeot 208 Rally4	Driver, Co-driver, Junior ERC	HK
48	(Italy) Geronimo Nerobutto	(Italy) Alessio Angeli	(Italy) Geronimo Nerobutto	Peugeot 208 Rally4	Driver, Co-driver, Junior ERC	HK
49	(Republic of Ireland) Jack Brennan	(Republic of Ireland) John McGrath	(Republic of Ireland) Motorsport Ireland Rally Academy	Peugeot 208 Rally4	Driver, Co-driver, Team, Junior ERC	HK
50	(Republic of Ireland) Aoife Raftery	(Republic of Ireland) Hannah McKillop	(Republic of Ireland) Motorsport Ireland Rally Academy	Peugeot 208 Rally4	Driver, Co-driver, Team, Junior ERC	HK
51	(Bulgaria) Aleksandar Tomov	(Bulgaria) Yavor Brankov	(Hungary) HRT Racing Kft.	Peugeot 208 Rally4	Driver, Co-driver, Team, Junior ERC	HK
52	(Finland) Tuomas Välilä	(Finland) Päivi Välilä	(Finland) Tuomas Välilä	Ford Fiesta Rally4	Driver, Co-driver	P
53	(Hungary) Márton Bertalan	(Hungary) Róbert Paizs	(Hungary) TRT Rally Team	Peugeot 208 Rally4	Driver, Co-driver, Team	P
54	(Romania) Cristiana Oprea	(Romania) Denisa-Alexia Parteni	(Romania) Cristiana Oprea	Opel Corsa Rally4	Driver, Co-driver	P

=== Itinerary ===
All dates and times are CEST (UTC+2).

Date	No.	Time	Stage name	Distance
12 April	—	11:00	Gyártelep [Shakedown]	4.60 km
12 April	SS1	18:05	Királyszentistván	2.05 km
13 April	SS2	9:48	Hegyesd 1	15.30 km
13 April	SS3	11:06	Kislőtér 1	27.40 km
13 April	SS4	12:04	Várpalota 1	8.40 km
13 April	SS5	15:17	Hegyesd 2	15.30 km
13 April	SS6	16:35	Kislőtér 2	27.40 km
13 April	SS7	17:33	Várpalota 2	8.40 km
14 April	SS8	9:27	Iszka 1	15.34 km
14 April	SS9	10:35	Tés 1	10.25 km
14 April	SS10	11:35	Nagylőtér 1	18.50 km
14 April	SS11	13:59	Iszka 2	15.34 km
14 April	SS12	15:07	Tés 2	10.25 km
14 April	SS13	17:05	Nagylőtér 2 [Power Stage]	18.50 km

== Report ==
=== ERC Rally2 ===
==== Classification ====
Position		No.	Driver	Co-driver	Entrant	Car	Time	Difference	Points	
Event	Class	No.	Driver	Co-driver	Entrant	Car	Time	Difference	Event	Stage
1	1	14	Simone Tempestini	Sergiu Itu	Simone Tempestini	Škoda Fabia RS Rally2	1:52:50.4	0.0	30	3
2	2	5	Mathieu Franceschi	Andy Malfoy	Mathieu Franceschi	Škoda Fabia RS Rally2	1:53:07.4	+17.0	24	5
3	3	9	Miklós Csomós	Attila Nagy	HRT Racing Kft.	Škoda Fabia Rally2 evo	1:53:20.3	+29.9	21	4
4	4	1	Hayden Paddon	John Kennard	BRC Racing Team	Hyundai i20 N Rally2	1:53:34.9	+44.5	19	0
5	5	10	Erik Cais	Igor Bacigál	ACCR Orsák Rally Sport	Škoda Fabia RS Rally2	1:54:34.4	+1:44.0	17	0
6	6	11	Mikołaj Marczyk	Szymon Gospodarczyk	Mikołaj Marczyk	Škoda Fabia RS Rally2	1:54.49.7	+1:59.3	15	0
7	7	12	Andrea Mabellini	Virginia Lenzi	Team MRF Tyres	Škoda Fabia RS Rally2	1:55:03.0	+2:12.6	13	2
8	8	18	Jon Armstrong	Eoin Tracy	Jon Armstrong	Ford Fiesta Rally2	1:55:10.9	+2:20.5	11	1
9	9	7	Simon Wagner	Gerald Winter	Eurosol Racing Team Hungary	Škoda Fabia RS Rally2	1:56:39.5	+3:49.1	9	0
10	10	6	Filip Mareš	Radovan Bucha	ACCR Toyota Dolák	Toyota GR Yaris Rally2	1:57:01.3	+4:10.9	7	0
11	11	20	Vladas Jurkevičius	Aisvydas Paliukėnas	Eldorado x Humbility Sports	Škoda Fabia Rally2 evo	1:58:17.3	+5:26.9	5	0
12	12	15	Frigyes Turán	Gábor Zsiros	Turán Motorsport SE	Volkswagen Polo GTI R5	1:58:31.2	+5:40.8	4	0
13	13	16	Martin László	Viktor Bán	Topp-Cars Rally Team	Škoda Fabia RS Rally2	1:58:35.1	+5:44.7	3	0
14	14	29	Giacomo Costenaro	Justin Bardini	Giacomo Costenaro	Škoda Fabia Rally2 evo	2:00:12.8	+7:22.4	2	0
15	15	24	Kristóf Klausz	Tamás Papp	Klaus Motorsport	Škoda Fabia Rally2 evo	2:00:26.4	+7:36.0	1	0
17	16	17	Gábor Német	Gergely Németh	Kole Média Center Kft.	Škoda Fabia RS Rally2	2:01:33.3	+8:42.9	0	0
18	17	19	Bogdan Cuzma	Ditte Kammersgaard	Bogdan Cuzma	Škoda Fabia RS Rally2	2:05:17.6	+12:27.2	0	0
30	18	28	Philip Allen	Dale Furniss	Philip Allen	Hyundai i20 N Rally2	2:37:52.3	+45:01.9	0	0
Retired SS12		3	Mārtiņš Sesks	Renārs Francis	Team MRF Tyres	Toyota GR Yaris Rally2	Wheel		0	0
Retired SS12		23	Róbert Bútor	Róbert Tagai	Dunakanyar Autós SE	Citroën C3 Rally2	Retired		0	0
Retired SS12		25	László Bodolai	Attila Deák	SZA Performance Kft.	Ford Fiesta Rally2	Rolled		0	0
Retired SS10		8	Mikko Heikkilä	Kristian Temonen	Mikko Heikkilä	Toyota GR Yaris Rally2	Lost wheel		0	0
Retired SS9		21	Péter Ranga	János Czakó	Pécsi Sport Nonprofit Zrt.	Škoda Fabia R5	Retired		0	0
Retired SS9		22	András Hadik	István Juhász	SZA Performance Kft.	Ford Fiesta Rally2	Retired		0	0
Retired SS7		26	József Trencsényi	Gábor Verba	Extrém Sport Team Kft.	Škoda Fabia Rally2 evo	Retired		0	0
Retired SS3		2	Efrén Llarena	Sara Fernández	Team MRF Tyres	Škoda Fabia RS Rally2	Radiator		0	0
Did not start		4	Mads Østberg	Patrik Barth	TRT Rally Team	Citroën C3 Rally2	Medical reasons		0	0
Did not start		27	Sándor Ollé	Rebeka Ollé	Treff-Autóház Kft.	Škoda Fabia R5	Technical on shakedown		0	0

==== Special stages ====
Stage	Winners	Car	Time	Class leaders
SS1	Cais / Bacigál	Škoda Fabia RS Rally2	1:47.8	Cais / Bacigál
SS2	Franceschi / Malfoy	Škoda Fabia RS Rally2	8:00.5	Franceschi / Malfoy
SS3	Tempestini / Itu	Škoda Fabia RS Rally2	16:40.4	Heikkilä / Temonen
SS4	Csomós / Nagy	Škoda Fabia Rally2 evo	4:22.9	Heikkilä / Temonen
SS5	Franceschi / Malfoy	Škoda Fabia RS Rally2	7:52.2	Sesks / Francis
SS6	Sesks / Francis	Toyota GR Yaris Rally2	16:23.1	Sesks / Francis
SS7	Franceschi / Malfoy	Škoda Fabia RS Rally2	4:15.6	Heikkilä / Temonen
SS8	Heikkilä / Temonen	Toyota GR Yaris Rally2	8:55.7	Heikkilä / Temonen
SS9	Heikkilä / Temonen	Toyota GR Yaris Rally2	7:20.4	Heikkilä / Temonen
SS10	Sesks / Francis	Toyota GR Yaris Rally2	10:12.9	Sesks / Francis
SS11	Franceschi / Malfoy	Škoda Fabia RS Rally2	8:50.0	Sesks / Francis
SS12	Tempestini / Itu	Škoda Fabia RS Rally2	7:12.4	Tempestini / Itu
SS13	Franceschi / Malfoy	Škoda Fabia RS Rally2	9:58.6	Tempestini / Itu

==== Championship standings ====
Pos.	Drivers' championships			Co-drivers' championships		
Pos.	Move	Driver	Points	Move	Co-driver	Points
1	New entry	Simone Tempestini	33	New entry	Sergiu Itu	33
2	New entry	Mathieu Franceschi	29	New entry	Andy Malfoy	29
3	New entry	Miklós Csomós	25	New entry	Attila Nagy	25
4	New entry	Hayden Paddon	19	New entry	John Kennard	19
5	New entry	Erik Cais	17	New entry	Igor Bacigál	17

=== ERC-3 Rally3 ===
==== Classification ====
Position		No.	Driver	Co-driver	Entrant	Car	Time	Difference	Points
Event	Class	No.	Driver	Co-driver	Entrant	Car	Time	Difference	Event
16	1	31	Filip Kohn	Tom Woodburn	Filip Kohn	Ford Fiesta Rally3	2:01:10.6	0.0	30
19	2	30	Igor Widłak	Michał Marczewski	Grupa PGS RT	Ford Fiesta Rally3	2:06:22.6	+5:12.0	24
20	3	32	Martin Ravenščak	Dora Ravenščak	Martin Ravenščak	Ford Fiesta Rally3	2:09:00.0	+7:49.4	21
24	4	33	Kerem Kazaz	Andris Mālnieks	Atölye Kazaz	Ford Fiesta Rally3	2:16:49.8	+15:39.2	19

==== Special stages ====
Stage	Winners	Car	Time	Class leaders
SS1	Kohn / Woodburn	Ford Fiesta Rally3	1:54.6	Kohn / Woodburn
SS2	Kohn / Woodburn	Ford Fiesta Rally3	8:39.2	Kohn / Woodburn
SS3	Kohn / Woodburn	Ford Fiesta Rally3	17:54.7	Kohn / Woodburn
SS4	Kohn / Woodburn	Ford Fiesta Rally3	4:42.8	Kohn / Woodburn
SS5	Kohn / Woodburn	Ford Fiesta Rally3	8:33.4	Kohn / Woodburn
SS6	Kohn / Woodburn	Ford Fiesta Rally3	17:40.9	Kohn / Woodburn
SS7	Kohn / Woodburn	Ford Fiesta Rally3	4:41.4	Kohn / Woodburn
SS8	Kohn / Woodburn	Ford Fiesta Rally3	9:46.3	Kohn / Woodburn
SS9	Kohn / Woodburn	Ford Fiesta Rally3	7:38.8	Kohn / Woodburn
SS10	Kohn / Woodburn	Ford Fiesta Rally3	11:10.8	Kohn / Woodburn
SS11	Kohn / Woodburn	Ford Fiesta Rally3	9:43.9	Kohn / Woodburn
SS12	Kohn / Woodburn	Ford Fiesta Rally3	7:36.3	Kohn / Woodburn
SS13	Kohn / Woodburn	Ford Fiesta Rally3	11:07.5	Kohn / Woodburn

==== Championship standings ====
Pos.	Drivers' championships			Co-drivers' championships		
Pos.	Move	Driver	Points	Move	Co-driver	Points
1	New entry	Filip Kohn	30	New entry	Tom Woodburn	33
2	New entry	Igor Widłak	24	New entry	Michał Marczewski	29
3	New entry	Martin Ravenščak	21	New entry	Dora Ravenščak	25
4	New entry	Kerem Kazaz	19	New entry	Andris Mālnieks	19

=== ERC-4 Rally4 ===
==== Classification ====
Position		No.	Driver	Co-driver	Entrant	Car	Time	Difference	Points
Event	Class	No.	Driver	Co-driver	Entrant	Car	Time	Difference	Event
21	1	36	Max McRae	Cameron Fair	TRT Rally Team	Peugeot 208 Rally4	2:09:51.5	0.0	30
22	2	53	Márton Bertalan	Róbert Paizs	TRT Rally Team	Peugeot 208 Rally4	2:11:00.6	+1:09.1	24
23	3	38	Jaspar Vaher	Sander Pruul	M-Sport Poland	Ford Fiesta Rally4	2:11:32.1	+1:40.6	21
25	4	37	Mille Johansson	Johan Grönvall	IK Sport Racing	Opel Corsa Rally4	2:17:16.3	+7:24.8	19
26	5	50	Aoife Raftery	Hannah McKillop	Motorsport Ireland Rally Academy	Peugeot 208 Rally4	2:17:22.4	+7:30.9	17
27	6	49	Jack Brennan	John McGrath	Motorsport Ireland Rally Academy	Peugeot 208 Rally4	2:17.28.3	+7:36.8	15
28	7	47	Davide Pesavento	Matteo Zaramella	Davide Pesavento	Peugeot 208 Rally4	2:25:53.2	+16:01.7	13
29	8	45	Alfred Kramer	Jeannette Kvick	Alfred Kramer	Peugeot 208 Rally4	2:34:36.4	+24:44.9	11
31	9	43	Liam Müller	Alexander Hirsch	Liam Müller	Opel Corsa Rally4	2:52:37.8	+42:46.3	9
32	10	46	Daniel Polášek	Zdeněk Omelka	Daniel Polášek	Peugeot 208 Rally4	3:12:26.3	+1:02:34.8	7
33	11	48	Geronimo Nerobutto	Alessio Angeli	Geronimo Nerobutto	Peugeot 208 Rally4	3:15:56.5	+1:06:05.0	5
Retired SS13		54	Cristiana Oprea	Denisa-Alexia Parteni	Cristiana Oprea	Opel Corsa Rally4	Mechanical		0
Retired SS11		51	Aleksandar Tomov	Yavor Brankov	HRT Racing Kft.	Peugeot 208 Rally4	Retired		0
Retired SS10		35	Mattia Zanin	Elia De Guio	Mattia Zanin	Peugeot 208 Rally4	Retired		0
Retired SS10		39	Leevi Lassila	Antti Linnaketo	Leevi Lassila	Ford Fiesta Rally4	Oil leak		0
Retired SS10		41	Calle Carlberg	Jørgen Eriksen	ADAC Opel Rallye Junior Team	Opel Corsa Rally4	Retired		0
Retired SS6		44	Patrik Herczig	Kristóf Varga	HRT Racing Kft.	Peugeot 208 Rally4	Retired		0
Retired SS3		34	Timo Schulz	Michael Wenzel	ADAC Opel Rallye Junior Team	Opel Corsa Rally4	Radiator		0
Retired SS3		40	Karl-Markus Sei	Martin Leotoots	ALM Motorsport	Peugeot 208 Rally4	Retired		0
Retired SS3		52	Tuomas Välilä	Päivi Välilä	Tuomas Välilä	Ford Fiesta Rally4	Overheated engine		0

==== Special stages ====
Stage	Winners	Car	Time	Class leaders
SS1	Vaher / Pruul	Ford Fiesta Rally4	2:00.8	Vaher / Pruul
SS2	Vaher / Pruul	Ford Fiesta Rally4	8:52.5	Vaher / Pruul
SS3	Bertalan / Paizs	Peugeot 208 Rally4	18:57.5	Vaher / Pruul
SS4	Bertalan / Paizs	Peugeot 208 Rally4	4:53.3	Vaher / Pruul
SS5	Johansson / Grönvall	Opel Corsa Rally4	8:49.6	Vaher / Pruul
SS6	McRae / Fair	Peugeot 208 Rally4	18:39.6	McRae / Fair
SS7	Johansson / Grönvall	Opel Corsa Rally4	4:53.5	McRae / Fair
SS8	Johansson / Grönvall	Opel Corsa Rally4	10:10.8	McRae / Fair
SS9	Johansson / Grönvall	Opel Corsa Rally4	8:07.2	McRae / Fair
SS10	Johansson / Grönvall	Opel Corsa Rally4	11:50.8	McRae / Fair
SS11	Johansson / Grönvall	Opel Corsa Rally4	10:27.8	McRae / Fair
SS12	Johansson / Grönvall	Opel Corsa Rally4	8:03.1	McRae / Fair
SS13	Vaher / Pruul	Ford Fiesta Rally4	11:57.3	McRae / Fair

==== Championship standings ====
Pos.	Drivers' championships			Co-drivers' championships		
Pos.	Move	Driver	Points	Move	Co-driver	Points
1	New entry	Max McRae	30	New entry	Cameron Fair	30
2	New entry	Márton Bertalan	24	New entry	Róbert Paizs	24
3	New entry	Jaspar Vaher	21	New entry	Sander Pruul	21
4	New entry	Mille Johansson	19	New entry	Johan Grönvall	19
5	New entry	Aoife Raftery	17	New entry	Hannah McKillop	17

=== Junior ERC Rally4 ===
==== Classification ====
Position		No.	Driver	Co-driver	Entrant	Car	Time	Difference	Points
Event	Class	No.	Driver	Co-driver	Entrant	Car	Time	Difference	Event
21	1	36	Max McRae	Cameron Fair	TRT Rally Team	Peugeot 208 Rally4	2:09:51.5	0.0	30
23	2	38	Jaspar Vaher	Sander Pruul	M-Sport Poland	Ford Fiesta Rally4	2:11:32.1	+1:40.6	24
25	3	37	Mille Johansson	Johan Grönvall	IK Sport Racing	Opel Corsa Rally4	2:17:16.3	+7:24.8	21
26	4	50	Aoife Raftery	Hannah McKillop	Motorsport Ireland Rally Academy	Peugeot 208 Rally4	2:17:22.4	+7:30.9	19
27	5	49	Jack Brennan	John McGrath	Motorsport Ireland Rally Academy	Peugeot 208 Rally4	2:17.28.3	+7:36.8	17
28	6	47	Davide Pesavento	Matteo Zaramella	Davide Pesavento	Peugeot 208 Rally4	2:25:53.2	+16:01.7	15
29	7	45	Alfred Kramer	Jeannette Kvick	Alfred Kramer	Peugeot 208 Rally4	2:34:36.4	+24:44.9	13
31	8	43	Liam Müller	Alexander Hirsch	Liam Müller	Opel Corsa Rally4	2:52:37.8	+42:46.3	11
32	9	46	Daniel Polášek	Zdeněk Omelka	Daniel Polášek	Peugeot 208 Rally4	3:12:26.3	+1:02:34.8	9
33	10	48	Geronimo Nerobutto	Alessio Angeli	Geronimo Nerobutto	Peugeot 208 Rally4	3:15:56.5	+1:06:05.0	7
Retired SS11		51	Aleksandar Tomov	Yavor Brankov	HRT Racing Kft.	Peugeot 208 Rally4	Retired		0
Retired SS10		35	Mattia Zanin	Elia De Guio	Mattia Zanin	Peugeot 208 Rally4	Retired		0
Retired SS10		39	Leevi Lassila	Antti Linnaketo	Leevi Lassila	Ford Fiesta Rally4	Oil leak		0
Retired SS10		41	Calle Carlberg	Jørgen Eriksen	ADAC Opel Rallye Junior Team	Opel Corsa Rally4	Retired		0
Retired SS6		44	Patrik Herczig	Kristóf Varga	HRT Racing Kft.	Peugeot 208 Rally4	Retired		0
Retired SS3		34	Timo Schulz	Michael Wenzel	ADAC Opel Rallye Junior Team	Opel Corsa Rally4	Radiator		0
Retired SS3		40	Karl-Markus Sei	Martin Leotoots	ALM Motorsport	Peugeot 208 Rally4	Retired		0

==== Special stages ====
Stage	Winners	Car	Time	Class leaders
SS1	Vaher / Pruul	Ford Fiesta Rally4	2:00.8	Vaher / Pruul
SS2	Vaher / Pruul	Ford Fiesta Rally4	8:52.5	Vaher / Pruul
SS3	Carlberg / Eriksen	Opel Corsa Rally4	19:02.5	Vaher / Pruul
SS4	Vaher / Pruul	Ford Fiesta Rally4	4:55.4	Vaher / Pruul
SS5	Johansson / Grönvall	Opel Corsa Rally4	8:49.6	Vaher / Pruul
SS6	McRae / Fair	Peugeot 208 Rally4	18:39.6	McRae / Fair
SS7	Johansson / Grönvall	Opel Corsa Rally4	4:53.5	McRae / Fair
SS8	Johansson / Grönvall	Opel Corsa Rally4	10:10.8	McRae / Fair
SS9	Johansson / Grönvall	Opel Corsa Rally4	8:07.2	McRae / Fair
SS10	Johansson / Grönvall	Opel Corsa Rally4	11:50.8	McRae / Fair
SS11	Johansson / Grönvall	Opel Corsa Rally4	10:27.8	McRae / Fair
SS12	Johansson / Grönvall	Opel Corsa Rally4	8:03.1	McRae / Fair
SS13	Vaher / Pruul	Ford Fiesta Rally4	11:57.3	McRae / Fair

==== Championship standings ====
Pos.	Drivers' championships		
Pos.	Move	Driver	Points
1	New entry	Max McRae	30
2	New entry	Jaspar Vaher	24
3	New entry	Mille Johansson	21
4	New entry	Aoife Raftery	19
5	New entry	Jack Brennan	17
