= 2024 Rally Islas Canarias =

Motor racing event in the Canary Islands

2024 Rally Islas Canarias: 48. Rally Islas Canarias 2024
Round 2 of 8 in the 2024 European Rally Championship
← Previous event	Next event →
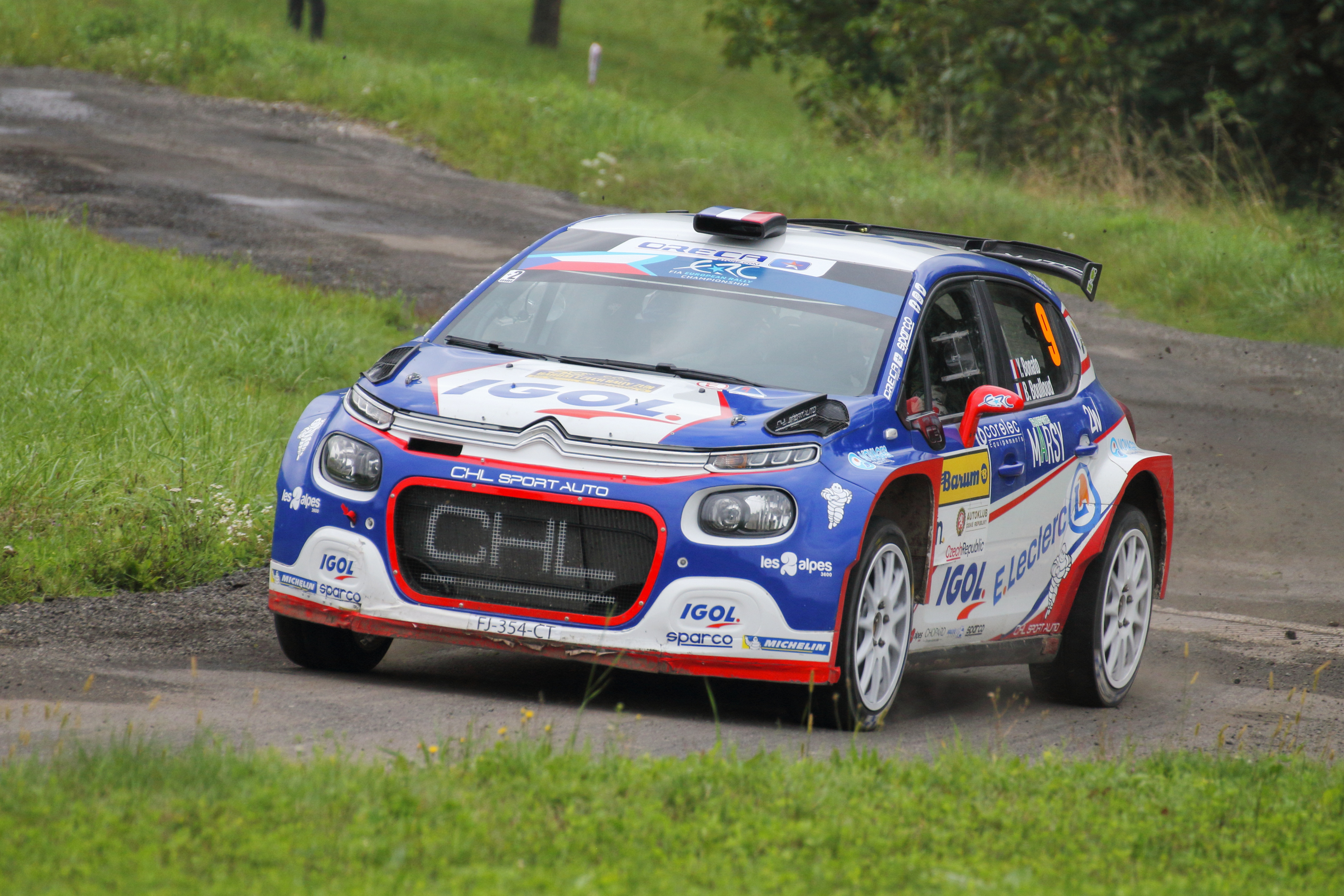
- Yoann Bonato won Rally Islas Canarias in 2023
- Host country: Spain
- Rally base: Las Palmas, Canary Islands
- Held on: 2 May 2024
- Start location: Las Palmas, Canary Islands
- Finish location: 4 May 2024
- Stages: 13 (193.12 km; 120.00 miles)
- Stage surface: Asphalt
- Transport distance: 424.56 km (263.81 miles)
- Overall distance: 617.68 km (383.81 miles)

Statistics
- Crews registered: 49
- Crews: 49 at start, 37 at finish

Overall results
- Overall winner: (France) Yoann Bonato (France) Benjamin Boulloud (France) Yoann Bonato; Citroën C3 Rally2; 1:57:18.8

The 2024 Rally Islas Canarias was a motor racing event for rally cars held over three days from 2 to 4 May 2024. It was the second round of the 2024 European Rally Championship. The event was based in Las Palmas, and was contested over thirteen stages, covering a total competitive distance of 193.12 km (120 mi).

Yoann Bonato and Benjamin Boulloud were defending rally winners. Jon Armstrong and Cameron Fair were defending rally winners in ERC-3. Bendegúz Hangodi and László Bunkoczi were defending rally winners in ERC-4.

Yoann Bonato and Benjamin Boulloud successfully defended the rally win. Igor Widłak and Daniel Dymurski won in ERC-3. Mille Johansson and Johan Grönvall won in ERC-4 and Junior ERC.

== Background ==
A total of 49 entries entered with European Rally Championship eligibility.

Rally2 and R5 entries competing in the European Rally Championship
No.	Driver	Co-Driver	Entrant	Car	Championship eligibility	Tyre
1	(New Zealand) Hayden Paddon	(New Zealand) John Kennard	(Italy) BRC Racing Team	Hyundai i20 N Rally2	Driver, Co-driver, Team	P
2	(Spain) Efrén Llarena	(Spain) Sara Fernández	(India) Team MRF Tyres	Škoda Fabia RS Rally2	Driver, Co-driver, Team	MR
3	(France) Mathieu Franceschi	(France) Andy Malfoy	(France) Mathieu Franceschi	Škoda Fabia RS Rally2	Driver, Co-driver	MI
4	(Hungary) Miklós Csomós	(Hungary) Attila Nagy	(Hungary) HRT Racing Kft.	Škoda Fabia Rally2 evo	Driver, Co-driver, Team	P
5	(Czech Republic) Erik Cais	(Slovakia) Igor Bacigál	(Czech Republic) ACCR Orsák Rally Sport	Škoda Fabia RS Rally2	Driver, Co-driver, Team	MI
6	(Poland) Mikołaj Marczyk	(Poland) Szymon Gospodarczyk	(Poland) Mikołaj Marczyk	Škoda Fabia RS Rally2	Driver, Co-driver	MI
7	(Italy) Andrea Mabellini	(Italy) Virginia Lenzi	(India) Team MRF Tyres	Škoda Fabia RS Rally2	Driver, Co-driver, Team	MR
8	(Republic of Ireland) Jon Armstrong	(Republic of Ireland) Eoin Tracy	(Republic of Ireland) Jon Armstrong	Ford Fiesta Rally2	Driver, Co-driver	P
9	(Austria) Simon Wagner	(Austria) Gerald Winter	Eurosol Racing Team Hungary	Škoda Fabia RS Rally2	Driver, Co-driver, Team	MI
10	(Czech Republic) Filip Mareš	(Czech Republic) Radovan Bucha	(Czech Republic) ACCR Toyota Dolák	Toyota GR Yaris Rally2	Driver, Co-driver, Team	HK
11	(Hungary) Martin László	(Hungary) Viktor Bán	(Hungary) Topp-Cars Rally Team	Škoda Fabia RS Rally2	Driver, Co-driver, Team	P
12	(Italy) Giacomo Costenaro	(United Kingdom) Justin Bardini	(Italy) Giacomo Costenaro	Škoda Fabia Rally2 evo	Driver, Co-driver	MR
14	(Latvia) Mārtiņš Sesks	(Latvia) Renārs Francis	(India) Team MRF Tyres	Toyota GR Yaris Rally2	Driver, Co-driver, Team	MR
15	(Norway) Mads Østberg	(Sweden) Patrik Barth	(Hungary) TRT Rally Team	Citroën C3 Rally2	Driver, Co-driver, Team	MI
16	(France) Yoann Bonato	(France) Benjamin Boulloud	(France) Yoann Bonato	Citroën C3 Rally2	Driver, Co-driver	MI
17	(Cyprus) Alexey Lukyanuk	(Cyprus) Yuriy Kulikov	(Spain) C.D. Todo Sport	Hyundai i20 N Rally2	Driver, Co-driver, Team	P
18	(Spain) José Antonio Suárez	(Spain) Alberto Iglesias	(Spain) Recalvi Team	Škoda Fabia RS Rally2	Driver, Co-driver, Team	P
19	(Spain) Diego Ruiloba	(Spain) Ángel Vela	(Spain) Citroën Rally Team	Citroën C3 Rally2	Driver, Co-driver, Team	P
20	(Spain) Alejandro Cachón	(Spain) Borja Rozada	(Spain) Toyota España	Toyota GR Yaris Rally2	Driver, Co-driver, Team	P
21	(Spain) Iván Ares	(Spain) Javier Martínez	(Spain) Hyundai Motor España - Ares Racing	Hyundai i20 N Rally2	Driver, Co-driver, Team	P
22	(Spain) Óscar Palomo	(Spain) Sergio Fernández	(Spain) Hyundai Motor España	Hyundai i20 N Rally2	Driver, Co-driver, Team	P
23	(Spain) Yeray Lemes	(Spain) Rogelio Peñate	(Spain) C.D. Todo Sport	Citroën C3 Rally2	Driver, Co-driver, Team	MI
24	(Spain) Luis Monzón	(Spain) José Carlos Déniz	(Spain) Auto-Laca Competición	Citroën C3 Rally2	Driver, Co-driver, Team	P
25	(Spain) Miguel Suárez	(Spain) Eduardo González	(Spain) C.D. Todo Sport	Citroën C3 Rally2	Driver, Co-driver, Team	P
26	(United Kingdom) Philip Allen	(United Kingdom) Dale Furniss	(United Kingdom) Philip Allen	Hyundai i20 N Rally2	Driver, Co-driver	P
27	(Austria) Hermann Neubauer	(Austria) Bernhard Ettel	(Austria) Hermann Neubauer	Škoda Fabia RS Rally2	Driver, Co-driver	P
28	(Germany) Albert von Thurn und Taxis	(Germany) Frank Christian	(Germany) Albert von Thurn und Taxis	Škoda Fabia RS Rally2	Driver, Co-driver	P
29	(Spain) Raúl Hernández	(Spain) José Murado	(Spain) Raúl Hernández	Škoda Fabia RS Rally2	Driver, Co-driver	P
30	(Spain) Roberto Blach	(Spain) Mauro Barreiro	(Spain) Roberto Blach	Škoda Fabia RS Rally2	Driver, Co-driver	P
52	(Spain) Enrique Cruz	(Spain) Yeray Mújica	(Spain) C.D. Copi Sport	Ford Fiesta Rally2	Driver, Co-driver, Team	P

Rally3 entries competing in the European Rally Championship-3
No.	Driver	Co-Driver	Entrant	Car	Championship eligibility	Tyre
32	(Poland) Igor Widłak	(Poland) Daniel Dymurski	(Poland) Grupa PGS RT	Ford Fiesta Rally3	Driver, Co-driver, Team	P
33	(Turkey) Kerem Kazaz	(Portugal) Hugo Magalhães	(Turkey) Atölye Kazaz	Ford Fiesta Rally3	Driver, Co-driver, Team	MR

Rally4 entries competing in the European Rally Championship-4
No.	Driver	Co-Driver	Entrant	Car	Championship eligibility	Tyre
34	(United Kingdom) Max McRae	(United Kingdom) Cameron Fair	(Hungary) TRT Rally Team	Peugeot 208 Rally4	Driver, Co-driver, Team, Junior ERC	HK
35	(Sweden) Mille Johansson	(Sweden) Johan Grönvall	(Slovenia) IK Sport Racing	Opel Corsa Rally4	Driver, Co-driver, Team, Junior ERC	HK
36	(Republic of Ireland) Aoife Raftery	(Republic of Ireland) Hannah McKillop	(Republic of Ireland) Motorsport Ireland Rally Academy	Peugeot 208 Rally4	Driver, Co-driver, Team, Junior ERC	HK
37	(Republic of Ireland) Jack Brennan	(Republic of Ireland) John McGrath	(Republic of Ireland) Motorsport Ireland Rally Academy	Peugeot 208 Rally4	Driver, Co-driver, Team, Junior ERC	HK
38	(Italy) Davide Pesavento	(Italy) Matteo Zaramella	(Italy) Davide Pesavento	Peugeot 208 Rally4	Driver, Co-driver, Junior ERC	HK
39	(Germany) Liam Müller	(Germany) Alexander Hirsch	(Germany) Liam Müller	Opel Corsa Rally4	Driver, Co-driver, Junior ERC	HK
40	(Czech Republic) Daniel Polášek	(Czech Republic) Zdeněk Omelka	(Czech Republic) Daniel Polášek	Peugeot 208 Rally4	Driver, Co-driver, Junior ERC	HK
41	(Italy) Geronimo Nerobutto	(Italy) Alessio Angeli	(Italy) Geronimo Nerobutto	Peugeot 208 Rally4	Driver, Co-driver, Junior ERC	HK
43	(Germany) Timo Schulz	(Germany) Michael Wenzel	(Germany) ADAC Opel Rallye Junior Team	Opel Corsa Rally4	Driver, Co-driver, Team, Junior ERC	HK
44	(Sweden) Calle Carlberg	(Norway) Jørgen Eriksen	(Germany) ADAC Opel Rallye Junior Team	Opel Corsa Rally4	Driver, Co-driver, Team, Junior ERC	HK
45	(Italy) Mattia Zanin	(Italy) Elia De Guio	(Italy) Mattia Zanin	Peugeot 208 Rally4	Driver, Co-driver, Junior ERC	HK
46	(Hungary) Patrik Herczig	(Hungary) Kristóf Varga	(Hungary) HRT Racing Kft.	Peugeot 208 Rally4	Driver, Co-driver, Team, Junior ERC	HK
47	(Estonia) Karl-Markus Sei	(Estonia) Martin Leotoots	(Estonia) ALM Motorsport	Peugeot 208 Rally4	Driver, Co-driver, Team, Junior ERC	HK
48	(Bulgaria) Aleksandar Tomov	(Bulgaria) Yavor Brankov	(Hungary) HRT Racing Kft.	Peugeot 208 Rally4	Driver, Co-driver, Team, Junior ERC	HK
49	(Romania) Cristiana Oprea	(Romania) Denisa-Alexia Parteni	(Romania) Cristiana Oprea	Opel Corsa Rally4	Driver, Co-driver	P
50	(Bulgaria) Ekaterina Stratieva	(Bulgaria) Georgi Avramov	(Bulgaria) Ekaterina Stratieva	Peugeot 208 Rally4	Driver, Co-driver	MR

=== Itinerary ===
All dates and times are WEST (UTC+1).

Date	No.	Time	Stage name	Distance
2 May	—	15:00	Santa María de Guía	3.57 km
2 May	SS1	20:35	Las Palmas de Gran Canaria	1.80 km
3 May	SS2	10:35	Agüimes-Santa Lucía 1	14.83 km
3 May	SS3	11:33	Tejeda 1	11.07 km
3 May	SS4	12:25	Artenara-Gáldar 1	21.15 km
3 May	SS5	15:48	Agüimes-Santa Lucía 2	14.83 km
3 May	SS6	16:43	Tejeda 2	11.07 km
3 May	SS7	17:35	Artenara-Gáldar 2	21.15 km
4 May	SS8	9:17	Arucas-Firgas 1	9.41 km
4 May	SS9	10:07	Moya-Valleseco 1	27.70 km
4 May	SS10	11:35	San Mateo-Valsequillo 1	11.50 km
4 May	SS11	14:07	Arucas-Firgas 2	9.41 km
4 May	SS12	14:57	Moya-Valleseco 2	27.70 km
4 May	SS13	17:05	San Mateo-Valsequillo 2 [Power Stage]	11.50 km

== Report ==
=== ERC Rally2 ===
==== Classification ====
Position		No.	Driver	Co-driver	Entrant	Car	Time	Difference	Points	
Event	Class	No.	Driver	Co-driver	Entrant	Car	Time	Difference	Event	Stage
1	1	16	Yoann Bonato	Benjamin Boulloud	Yoann Bonato	Citroën C3 Rally2	1:57:18.8	0.0	30	2
2	2	3	Mathieu Franceschi	Andy Malfoy	Mathieu Franceschi	Škoda Fabia RS Rally2	1:57:21.6	+2.8	24	3
3	3	20	Alejandro Cachón	Borja Rozada	Toyota España	Toyota GR Yaris Rally2	1:57:48.5	+29.7	21	5
4	4	19	Diego Ruiloba	Ángel Vela	Citroën Rally Team	Citroën C3 Rally2	1:57:51.2	+32.4	19	4
5	5	18	José Antonio Suárez	Alberto Iglesias	Recalvi Team	Škoda Fabia RS Rally2	1:57:54.1	+35.3	17	0
6	6	1	Hayden Paddon	John Kennard	BRC Racing Team	Hyundai i20 N Rally2	1:57:59.7	+40.9	15	1
7	7	8	Jon Armstrong	Eoin Tracy	Jon Armstrong	Ford Fiesta Rally2	1:58:17.9	+59.1	13	0
8	8	15	Mads Østberg	Patrik Barth	TRT Rally Team	Citroën C3 Rally2	1:58:19.9	+1:01.1	11	0
9	9	23	Yeray Lemes	Rogelio Peñate	C.D. Todo Sport	Citroën C3 Rally2	1:58:31.4	+1:12.6	9	0
10	10	9	Simon Wagner	Gerald Winter	Eurosol Racing Team Hungary	Škoda Fabia RS Rally2	1:58:36.5	+1:17.7	7	0
11	11	2	Efrén Llarena	Sara Fernández	Team MRF Tyres	Škoda Fabia RS Rally2	1:58:39.1	+1:20.3	5	0
12	12	52	Enrique Cruz	Yeray Mújica	C.D. Copi Sport	Ford Fiesta Rally2	1:58:52.0	+1:33.2	4	0
13	13	17	Alexey Lukyanuk	Yuriy Kulikov	C.D. Todo Sport	Hyundai i20 N Rally2	1:58:57.2	+1:38.4	3	0
14	14	5	Erik Cais	Igor Bacigál	ACCR Orsák Rally Sport	Škoda Fabia RS Rally2	1:58:59.0	+1:40.2	2	0
15	15	10	Filip Mareš	Radovan Bucha	ACCR Toyota Dolák	Toyota GR Yaris Rally2	1:59:16.2	+1:57.4	1	0
16	16	7	Andrea Mabellini	Virginia Lenzi	Team MRF Tyres	Škoda Fabia RS Rally2	1:59:28.9	+2:10.1	0	0
17	17	25	Miguel Suárez	Eduardo González	C.D. Todo Sport	Citroën C3 Rally2	1:59:39.2	+2:20.4	0	0
18	18	6	Mikołaj Marczyk	Szymon Gospodarczyk	Mikołaj Marczyk	Škoda Fabia RS Rally2	2:00:14.7	+2:55.9	0	0
19	19	27	Hermann Neubauer	Bernhard Ettel	Hermann Neubauer	Škoda Fabia RS Rally2	2:00:18.0	+2:59.2	0	0
20	20	26	Philip Allen	Dale Furniss	Philip Allen	Hyundai i20 N Rally2	2:00:36.5	+3:17.7	0	0
21	21	22	Óscar Palomo	Sergio Fernández	Hyundai Motor España	Hyundai i20 N Rally2	2:00:40.3	+3:21.5	0	0
22	22	28	Albert von Thurn und Taxis	Frank Christian	Albert von Thurn und Taxis	Škoda Fabia RS Rally2	2:00:41.6	+3:22.8	0	0
23	23	14	Mārtiņš Sesks	Renārs Francis	Team MRF Tyres	Toyota GR Yaris Rally2	2:01:11.5	+3:52.7	0	0
24	24	21	Iván Ares	Javier Martínez	Hyundai Motor España - Ares Racing	Hyundai i20 N Rally2	2:01:50.4	+4:31.6	0	0
25	25	29	Raúl Hernández	José Murado	Raúl Hernández	Škoda Fabia RS Rally2	2:04:22.9	+7:04.1	0	0
Retired SS11		30	Roberto Blach	Mauro Barreiro	Roberto Blach	Škoda Fabia RS Rally2	Mechanical		0	0
Retired SS10		11	Martin László	Viktor Bán	Topp-Cars Rally Team	Škoda Fabia RS Rally2	Accident		0	0
Retired SS5		12	Giacomo Costenaro	Justin Bardini	Giacomo Costenaro	Škoda Fabia Rally2 evo	Mechanical		0	0
Retired SS3		4	Miklós Csomós	Attila Nagy	HRT Racing Kft.	Škoda Fabia Rally2 evo	Accident		0	0
Retired SS1		24	Luis Monzón	José Carlos Déniz	Auto-Laca Competición	Citroën C3 Rally2	Lost wheel		0	0

==== Special stages ====
Stage	Winners	Car	Time	Class leaders
SS1	Paddon / Kennard	Hyundai i20 N Rally2	1:30.5	Paddon / Kennard
SS2	Bonato / Boulloud	Citroën C3 Rally2	9:03.1	Bonato / Boulloud
SS3	Cachón / Rozada	Toyota GR Yaris Rally2	6:28.6	Franceschi / Malfoy
SS4	Cachón / Rozada	Toyota GR Yaris Rally2	13:21.7	Cachón / Rozada
SS5	Bonato / Boulloud	Citroën C3 Rally2	9:03.9	Bonato / Boulloud
SS6	Cachón / Rozada	Toyota GR Yaris Rally2	6:25.7	Bonato / Boulloud
SS7	Cachón / Rozada	Toyota GR Yaris Rally2	13:16.8	Bonato / Boulloud
SS8	Bonato / Boulloud	Citroën C3 Rally2	4:59.5	Bonato / Boulloud
SS9	Bonato / Boulloud	Citroën C3 Rally2	17:05.1	Bonato / Boulloud
SS10	Ruilloba / Vela	Citroën C3 Rally2	6:53.0	Bonato / Boulloud
SS11	Franceschi / Malfoy	Škoda Fabia RS Rally2	4:56.9	Bonato / Boulloud
SS12	Franceschi / Malfoy	Škoda Fabia RS Rally2	17:01.0	Bonato / Boulloud
SS13	Cachón / Rozada	Toyota GR Yaris Rally2	6:46.2	Bonato / Boulloud

==== Championship standings ====
Pos.	Drivers' championships			Co-drivers' championships		
Pos.	Move	Driver	Points	Move	Co-driver	Points
1	1	Mathieu Franceschi	56	1	Andy Malfoy	56
2	2	Hayden Paddon	35	2	John Kennard	35
3	2	Simone Tempestini	33	2	Sergiu Itu	33
4	New entry	Yoann Bonato	32	New entry	Benjamin Boulloud	32
5	New entry	Alejandro Cachón	26	New entry	Borja Rozada	26

=== ERC-3 Rally3 ===
==== Classification ====
Position		No.	Driver	Co-driver	Entrant	Car	Time	Difference	Points
Event	Class	No.	Driver	Co-driver	Entrant	Car	Time	Difference	Event
33	1	16	Igor Widłak	Daniel Dymurski	Grupa PGS RT	Ford Fiesta Rally3	2:12:02.9	0.0	30
34	2	3	Kerem Kazaz	Hugo Magalhães	Atölye Kazaz	Ford Fiesta Rally3	2:12:38.1	+35.2	24

==== Special stages ====
Stage	Winners	Car	Time	Class leaders
SS1	Widłak / Dymurski	Ford Fiesta Rally3	1:41.9	Widłak / Dymurski
SS2	Kazaz / Magalhães	Ford Fiesta Rally3	10:10.8	Kazaz / Magalhães
SS3	Widłak / Dymurski; Kazaz / Magalhães	Ford Fiesta Rally3; Ford Fiesta Rally3	7:21.5	Kazaz / Magalhães
SS4	Kazaz / Magalhães	Ford Fiesta Rally3	15:05.5	Kazaz / Magalhães
SS5	Widłak / Dymurski	Ford Fiesta Rally3	10:17.1	Kazaz / Magalhães
SS6	Kazaz / Magalhães	Ford Fiesta Rally3	7:21.4	Kazaz / Magalhães
SS7	Kazaz / Magalhães	Ford Fiesta Rally3	14:56.3	Kazaz / Magalhães
SS8	Widłak / Dymurski	Ford Fiesta Rally3	5:37.9	Kazaz / Magalhães
SS9	Widłak / Dymurski	Ford Fiesta Rally3	19:01.3	Kazaz / Magalhães
SS10	Widłak / Dymurski	Ford Fiesta Rally3	7:38.2	Kazaz / Magalhães
SS11	Widłak / Dymurski	Ford Fiesta Rally3	5:30.6	Widłak / Dymurski
SS12	Widłak / Dymurski	Ford Fiesta Rally3	19:01.1	Widłak / Dymurski
SS13	Widłak / Dymurski	Ford Fiesta Rally3	7:43.1	Widłak / Dymurski

==== Championship standings ====
Pos.	Drivers' championships			Co-drivers' championships		
Pos.	Move	Driver	Points	Move	Co-driver	Points
1	1	Igor Widłak	54		Tom Woodburn	30
2	2	Kerem Kazaz	19	New entry	Daniel Dymurski	30
3	2	Filip Kohn	30	1	Michał Marczewski	24
4	1	Martin Ravenščak	21	New entry	Hugo Magalhães	24
5				1	Andris Mālnieks	21

=== ERC-4 Rally4 ===
==== Classification ====
Position		No.	Driver	Co-driver	Entrant	Car	Time	Difference	Points
Event	Class	No.	Driver	Co-driver	Entrant	Car	Time	Difference	Event
26	1	35	Mille Johansson	Johan Grönvall	IK Sport Racing	Opel Corsa Rally4	2:07:10.9	0.0	30
27	2	44	Calle Carlberg	Jørgen Eriksen	ADAC Opel Rallye Junior Team	Opel Corsa Rally4	2:07:46.4	+35.5	24
28	3	43	Timo Schulz	Michael Wenzel	ADAC Opel Rallye Junior Team	Opel Corsa Rally4	2:07:59.4	+48.5	21
29	4	34	Max McRae	Cameron Fair	TRT Rally Team	Peugeot 208 Rally4	2:08:40.1	+1:29.2	19
30	5	40	Daniel Polášek	Zdeněk Omelka	Daniel Polášek	Peugeot 208 Rally4	2:10:00.1	+2:49.2	17
31	6	39	Liam Müller	Alexander Hirsch	Liam Müller	Opel Corsa Rally4	2:10:24.9	+3:14.0	15
32	7	47	Karl-Markus Sei	Martin Leotoots	ALM Motorsport	Peugeot 208 Rally4	2:11:28.4	+4:17.5	13
35	8	46	Patrik Herczig	Kristóf Varga	HRT Racing Kft.	Peugeot 208 Rally4	2:12:38.4	+5:27.5	11
36	9	36	Aoife Raftery	Hannah McKillop	Motorsport Ireland Rally Academy	Peugeot 208 Rally4	2:16:20.2	+9:09.3	9
37	10	45	Mattia Zanin	Elia De Guio	Mattia Zanin	Peugeot 208 Rally4	3:07:59.4	+1:00:48.5	7
Retired SS11		38	Davide Pesavento	Matteo Zaramella	Davide Pesavento	Peugeot 208 Rally4	Retired		0
Retired SS10		50	Ekaterina Stratieva	Georgi Avramov	Ekaterina Stratieva	Peugeot 208 Rally4	Driveshaft		0
Retired SS8		37	Jack Brennan	John McGrath	Motorsport Ireland Rally Academy	Peugeot 208 Rally4	Accident damage		0
Retired SS7		48	Aleksandar Tomov	Yavor Brankov	HRT Racing Kft.	Peugeot 208 Rally4	Disqualified		0
Retired SS7		49	Cristiana Oprea	Denisa-Alexia Parteni	Cristiana Oprea	Opel Corsa Rally4	Disqualified		0
Retired SS5		41	Geronimo Nerobutto	Alessio Angeli	Geronimo Nerobutto	Peugeot 208 Rally4	Accident		0

==== Special stages ====
Stage	Winners	Car	Time	Class leaders
SS1	Zanin / De Guio	Peugeot 208 Rally4	1:41.1	Zanin / De Guio
SS2	Schulz / Wenzel	Opel Corsa Rally4	9:55.9	Schulz / Wenzel
SS3	14 drivers	Opel Corsa Rally4; Peugeot 208 Rally4	7:21.5	Schulz / Wenzel
SS4	Johansson / Grönvall	Opel Corsa Rally4	14:28.9	Johansson / Grönvall
SS5	Johansson / Grönvall	Opel Corsa Rally4	9:48.8	Johansson / Grönvall
SS6	Johansson / Grönvall	Opel Corsa Rally4	6:56.1	Johansson / Grönvall
SS7	Johansson / Grönvall	Opel Corsa Rally4	14:18.1	Johansson / Grönvall
SS8	Johansson / Grönvall	Opel Corsa Rally4	5:24.3	Johansson / Grönvall
SS9	Johansson / Grönvall	Opel Corsa Rally4	18:29.8	Johansson / Grönvall
SS10	Johansson / Grönvall	Opel Corsa Rally4	7:24.8	Johansson / Grönvall
SS11	McRae / Fair	Peugeot 208 Rally4	5:24.3	Johansson / Grönvall
SS12	Johansson / Grönvall	Opel Corsa Rally4	18:28.8	Johansson / Grönvall
SS13	Johansson / Grönvall	Opel Corsa Rally4	7:22.9	Johansson / Grönvall

==== Championship standings ====
Pos.	Drivers' championships			Co-drivers' championships		
Pos.	Move	Driver	Points	Move	Co-driver	Points
1		Max McRae	49		Cameron Fair	49
2	2	Mille Johansson	49	2	Johan Grönvall	49
3	2	Aoife Raftery	26	2	Hannah McKillop	26
4	New entry	Calle Carlberg	24	New entry	Jørgen Eriksen	24
5	3	Márton Bertalan	24	3	Róbert Paizs	24

=== Junior ERC Rally4 ===
==== Classification ====
Position		No.	Driver	Co-driver	Entrant	Car	Time	Difference	Points
Event	Class	No.	Driver	Co-driver	Entrant	Car	Time	Difference	Event
26	1	35	Mille Johansson	Johan Grönvall	IK Sport Racing	Opel Corsa Rally4	2:07:10.9	0.0	30
27	2	44	Calle Carlberg	Jørgen Eriksen	ADAC Opel Rallye Junior Team	Opel Corsa Rally4	2:07:46.4	+35.5	24
28	3	43	Timo Schulz	Michael Wenzel	ADAC Opel Rallye Junior Team	Opel Corsa Rally4	2:07:59.4	+48.5	21
29	4	34	Max McRae	Cameron Fair	TRT Rally Team	Peugeot 208 Rally4	2:08:40.1	+1:29.2	19
30	5	40	Daniel Polášek	Zdeněk Omelka	Daniel Polášek	Peugeot 208 Rally4	2:10:00.1	+2:49.2	17
31	6	39	Liam Müller	Alexander Hirsch	Liam Müller	Opel Corsa Rally4	2:10:24.9	+3:14.0	15
32	7	47	Karl-Markus Sei	Martin Leotoots	ALM Motorsport	Peugeot 208 Rally4	2:11:28.4	+4:17.5	13
35	8	46	Patrik Herczig	Kristóf Varga	HRT Racing Kft.	Peugeot 208 Rally4	2:12:38.4	+5:27.5	11
36	9	36	Aoife Raftery	Hannah McKillop	Motorsport Ireland Rally Academy	Peugeot 208 Rally4	2:16:20.2	+9:09.3	9
37	10	45	Mattia Zanin	Elia De Guio	Mattia Zanin	Peugeot 208 Rally4	3:07:59.4	+1:00:48.5	7
Retired SS11		38	Davide Pesavento	Matteo Zaramella	Davide Pesavento	Peugeot 208 Rally4	Retired		0
Retired SS8		37	Jack Brennan	John McGrath	Motorsport Ireland Rally Academy	Peugeot 208 Rally4	Accident damage		0
Retired SS7		48	Aleksandar Tomov	Yavor Brankov	HRT Racing Kft.	Peugeot 208 Rally4	Disqualified		0
Retired SS5		41	Geronimo Nerobutto	Alessio Angeli	Geronimo Nerobutto	Peugeot 208 Rally4	Accident		0

==== Special stages ====
Stage	Winners	Car	Time	Class leaders
SS1	Zanin / De Guio	Peugeot 208 Rally4	1:41.1	Zanin / De Guio
SS2	Schulz / Wenzel	Opel Corsa Rally4	9:55.9	Schulz / Wenzel
SS3	12 drivers	Opel Corsa Rally4; Peugeot 208 Rally4	7:21.5	Schulz / Wenzel
SS4	Johansson / Grönvall	Opel Corsa Rally4	14:28.9	Johansson / Grönvall
SS5	Johansson / Grönvall	Opel Corsa Rally4	9:48.8	Johansson / Grönvall
SS6	Johansson / Grönvall	Opel Corsa Rally4	6:56.1	Johansson / Grönvall
SS7	Johansson / Grönvall	Opel Corsa Rally4	14:18.1	Johansson / Grönvall
SS8	Johansson / Grönvall	Opel Corsa Rally4	5:24.3	Johansson / Grönvall
SS9	Johansson / Grönvall	Opel Corsa Rally4	18:29.8	Johansson / Grönvall
SS10	Johansson / Grönvall	Opel Corsa Rally4	7:24.8	Johansson / Grönvall
SS11	McRae / Fair	Peugeot 208 Rally4	5:24.3	Johansson / Grönvall
SS12	Johansson / Grönvall	Opel Corsa Rally4	18:28.8	Johansson / Grönvall
SS13	Johansson / Grönvall	Opel Corsa Rally4	7:22.9	Johansson / Grönvall

==== Championship standings ====
Pos.	Drivers' championships		
Pos.	Move	Driver	Points
1	2	Mille Johansson	51
2	1	Mille Johansson	49
3	1	Aoife Raftery	28
4	4	Liam Müller	26
5	4	Daniel Polášek	26
