= 2024 Royal Rally of Scandinavia =

Motor racing event

2024 Royal Rally of Scandinavia: 2. BAUHAUS Royal Rally of Scandinavia 2024
Round 3 of 8 in the 2024 European Rally Championship
| ← Previous event | Next event → |
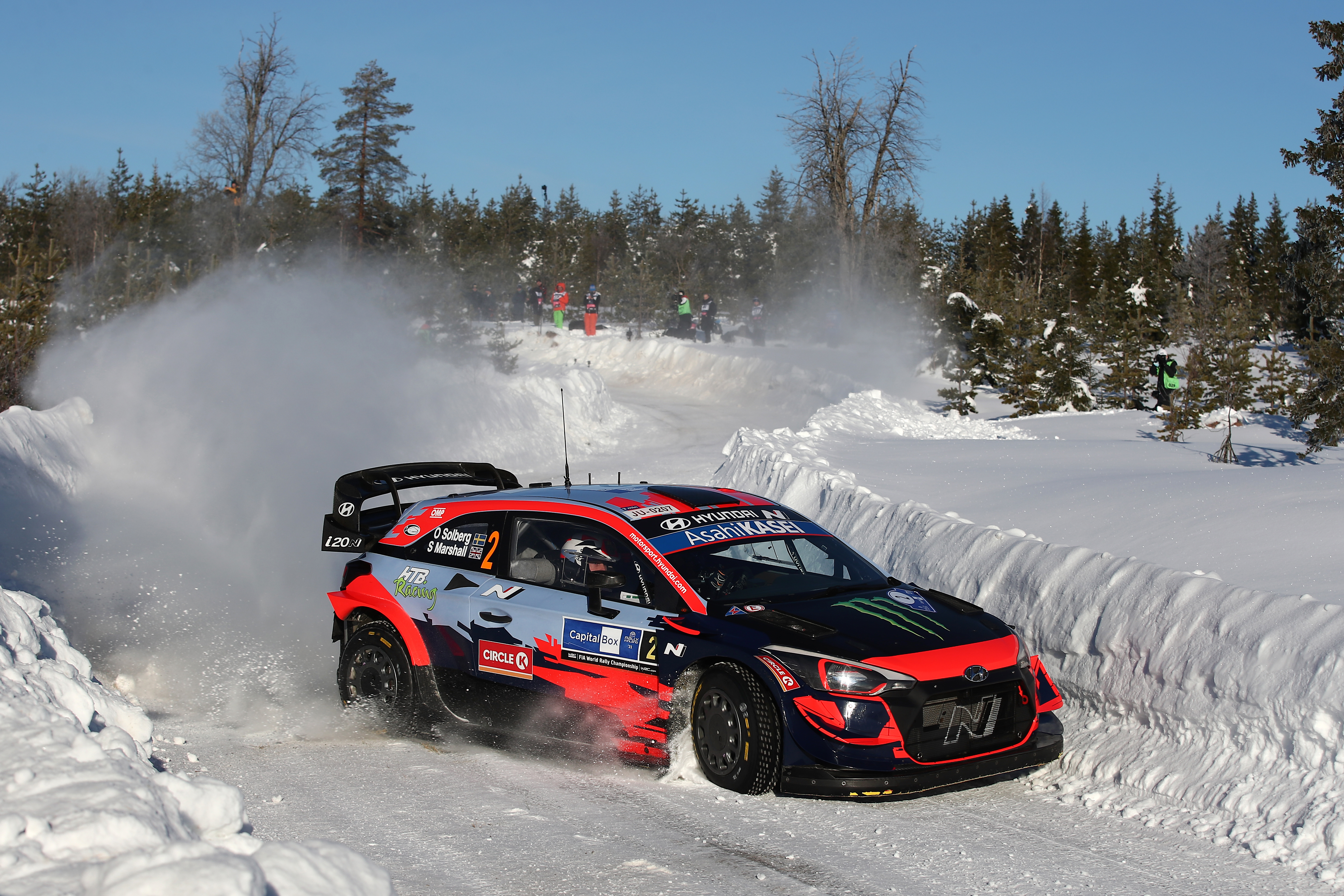
- Oliver Solberg won the rally in 2023.
- Host country: Sweden
- Rally base: Karlstad, Värmland County
- Held on: 13 June 2024
- Start location: Karlstad, Värmland County
- Finish location: 15 June 2024
- Stages: 17 (190.99 km; 118.68 miles)
- Stage surface: Gravel
- Transport distance: 707.69 km (439.74 miles)
- Overall distance: 898.68 km (558.41 miles)

Statistics
- Crews registered: 41
- Crews: 41 at start, 31 at finish

Overall results
- Overall winner: (Sweden) Oliver Solberg (United Kingdom) Elliott Edmondson (Sweden) Oliver Solberg; Škoda Fabia RS Rally2; 1:32:40.8

The 2024 Royal Rally of Scandinavia was a motor racing event for rally cars held over three days from 13 to 15 June 2024. It was the third round of the 2024 European Rally Championship. The event was based in Karlstad, and was contested over seventeen stages, covering a total competitive distance of 190.99 km (118.68 mi).

Oliver Solberg and Elliott Edmondson are defending rally winners. William Creighton and Liam Regan are defending rally winners in ERC-3. Isak Reiersen and Lucas Karlsson are defending rally winners in ERC-4 and Junior ERC.

== Background ==
A total of 41 entries entered with European Rally Championship eligibility.

Rally2 and R5 entries competing in the European Rally Championship
| No. | Driver | Co-Driver | Entrant | Car | Championship eligibility | Tyre |
|---|---|---|---|---|---|---|
| 1 | (New Zealand) Hayden Paddon | (New Zealand) John Kennard | (Italy) BRC Racing Team | Hyundai i20 N Rally2 | Driver, Co-driver, Team | P |
| 2 | (Spain) Efrén Llarena | (Spain) Sara Fernández | (India) Team MRF Tyres | Škoda Fabia RS Rally2 | Driver, Co-driver, Team | MR |
| 3 | (Sweden) Oliver Solberg | (United Kingdom) Elliott Edmondson | (Sweden) Oliver Solberg | Škoda Fabia RS Rally2 | Driver, Co-driver | P |
| 4 | (France) Mathieu Franceschi | (France) Andy Malfoy | (France) Mathieu Franceschi | Škoda Fabia RS Rally2 | Driver, Co-driver | MI |
| 5 | (Romania) Simone Tempestini | (Romania) Sergiu Itu | (Romania) Simone Tempestini | Škoda Fabia RS Rally2 | Driver, Co-driver | MI |
| 7 | (Republic of Ireland) Jon Armstrong | (Republic of Ireland) Eoin Tracy | (Republic of Ireland) Jon Armstrong | Ford Fiesta Rally2 | Driver, Co-driver | P |
| 8 | (Poland) Mikołaj Marczyk | (Poland) Szymon Gospodarczyk | (Poland) Mikołaj Marczyk | Škoda Fabia RS Rally2 | Driver, Co-driver | MI |
| 9 | (Italy) Andrea Mabellini | (Italy) Virginia Lenzi | (India) Team MRF Tyres | Škoda Fabia RS Rally2 | Driver, Co-driver, Team | MR |
| 10 | (Norway) Mads Østberg | (Sweden) Patrik Barth | (Hungary) TRT Rally Team | Citroën C3 Rally2 | Driver, Co-driver, Team | MI |
| 11 | (Czech Republic) Filip Mareš | (Czech Republic) Radovan Bucha | (Czech Republic) ACCR Toyota Dolák | Toyota GR Yaris Rally2 | Driver, Co-driver, Team | HK |
| 12 | (Italy) Giacomo Costenaro | (Italy) Pietro Elia Ometto | (Italy) Giacomo Costenaro | Škoda Fabia R5 | Driver, Co-driver | MR |
| 14 | (Latvia) Mārtiņš Sesks | (Latvia) Renārs Francis | (India) Team MRF Tyres | Toyota GR Yaris Rally2 | Driver, Co-driver, Team | MR |
| 15 | (Finland) Mikko Heikkilä | (Finland) Kristian Temonen | (Finland) Mikko Heikkilä | Toyota GR Yaris Rally2 | Driver, Co-driver | MI |
| 16 | (Norway) Petter Solberg | (Sweden) Jonas Andersson | (Norway) Petter Solberg | Volkswagen Polo GTI R5 | Driver, Co-driver | P |
| 17 | (Norway) Frank Tore Larsen | (Norway) Lars-Håkon Lundgreen | (Norway) Frank Tore Larsen | Volkswagen Polo GTI R5 | Driver, Co-driver | P |
| 18 | (Norway) Eyvind Brynildsen | (Norway) Jørn Listerud | (Norway) Eyvind Brynildsen | Volkswagen Polo GTI R5 | Driver, Co-driver | P |
| 19 | (Sweden) Isak Reiersen | (Sweden) Stefan Gustavsson | (Sweden) JC Raceteknik | Škoda Fabia RS Rally2 | Driver, Co-driver, Team | P |
| 20 | (Sweden) Johan Kristoffersson | (Norway) Stig Rune Skjærmoen | (Sweden) Kristofferson Motorsport | Volkswagen Polo GTI R5 | Driver, Co-driver, Team | P |
| 21 | (Sweden) Kalle Gustafsson | (Sweden) Magnus Nilsson | (Sweden) Kalle Gustafsson | Ford Fiesta Rally2 | Driver, Co-driver | P |
| 22 | (Sweden) Christoffer Haglund | (Sweden) Johan Johansson | (Sweden) Christoffer Haglund | Volkswagen Polo GTI R5 | Driver, Co-driver | P |
| 23 | (United Kingdom) Philip Allen | (United Kingdom) Dale Furniss | (United Kingdom) Philip Allen | Škoda Fabia RS Rally2 | Driver, Co-driver | P |
| 24 | (Romania) Bogdan Cuzma | (Romania) Florin Dorca | (Romania) Bogdan Cuzma | Škoda Fabia RS Rally2 | Driver, Co-driver | MI |

Rally3 entries competing in the European Rally Championship-3
| No. | Driver | Co-Driver | Entrant | Car | Championship eligibility | Tyre |
|---|---|---|---|---|---|---|
| 25 | (Poland) Igor Widłak | (Poland) Daniel Dymurski | (Poland) Grupa PGS RT | Ford Fiesta Rally3 | Driver, Co-driver, Team, Fiesta Rally3 Trophy | P |
| 26 | (Turkey) Kerem Kazaz | (Latvia) Andris Mālnieks | (Turkey) Atölye Kazaz | Ford Fiesta Rally3 | Driver, Co-driver, Team, Fiesta Rally3 Trophy | P |
| 27 | (Czech Republic) Filip Kohn | (United Kingdom) Tom Woodburn | (Czech Republic) Filip Kohn | Ford Fiesta Rally3 | Driver, Co-driver, Fiesta Rally3 Trophy | P |
| 28 | (Croatia) Martin Ravenščak | (Croatia) Dora Ravenščak | (Croatia) Martin Ravenščak | Ford Fiesta Rally3 | Driver, Co-driver, Fiesta Rally3 Trophy | P |
| 29 | (France) Tristan Charpentier | (France) Florian Barral | (France) Tristan Charpentier | Ford Fiesta Rally3 | Driver, Co-driver, Fiesta Rally3 Trophy | P |

Rally4 entries competing in the European Rally Championship-4
| No. | Driver | Co-Driver | Entrant | Car | Championship eligibility | Tyre |
|---|---|---|---|---|---|---|
| 30 | (Sweden) Mille Johansson | (Sweden) Johan Grönvall | (Slovenia) IK Sport Racing | Opel Corsa Rally4 | Driver, Co-driver, Team, Junior ERC | HK |
| 31 | (United Kingdom) Max McRae | (United Kingdom) Cameron Fair | (Hungary) TRT Rally Team | Peugeot 208 Rally4 | Driver, Co-driver, Team, Junior ERC | HK |
| 32 | (Republic of Ireland) Aoife Raftery | (Republic of Ireland) Hannah McKillop | (Republic of Ireland) Motorsport Ireland Rally Academy | Peugeot 208 Rally4 | Driver, Co-driver, Team, Junior ERC | HK |
| 33 | (Czech Republic) Daniel Polášek | (Czech Republic) Zdeněk Omelka | (Czech Republic) Daniel Polášek | Peugeot 208 Rally4 | Driver, Co-driver, Junior ERC | HK |
| 34 | (Germany) Liam Müller | (Germany) Alexander Hirsch | (Germany) Liam Müller | Opel Corsa Rally4 | Driver, Co-driver, Junior ERC | HK |
| 35 | (Sweden) Calle Carlberg | (Norway) Jørgen Eriksen | (Germany) ADAC Opel Rallye Junior Team | Opel Corsa Rally4 | Driver, Co-driver, Team, Junior ERC | HK |
| 36 | (Germany) Timo Schulz | (Germany) Michael Wenzel | (Germany) ADAC Opel Rallye Junior Team | Opel Corsa Rally4 | Driver, Co-driver, Team, Junior ERC | HK |
| 37 | (Italy) Davide Pesavento | (Italy) Flavio Zanella | (Italy) Davide Pesavento | Peugeot 208 Rally4 | Driver, Co-driver, Junior ERC | HK |
| 38 | (Estonia) Karl-Markus Sei | (Estonia) Martin Leotoots | (Estonia) ALM Motorsport | Peugeot 208 Rally4 | Driver, Co-driver, Team, Junior ERC | HK |
| 39 | (Hungary) Patrik Herczig | (Hungary) Kristóf Varga | (Hungary) HRT Racing Kft. | Peugeot 208 Rally4 | Driver, Co-driver, Team, Junior ERC | HK |
| 40 | (Italy) Geronimo Nerobutto | (Italy) Alessio Angeli | (Italy) Geronimo Nerobutto | Peugeot 208 Rally4 | Driver, Co-driver, Junior ERC | HK |
| 41 | (Italy) Mattia Zanin | (Italy) Elia De Guio | (Italy) Mattia Zanin | Peugeot 208 Rally4 | Driver, Co-driver, Junior ERC | HK |
| 43 | (Sweden) Patrik Hallberg | (Sweden) John Stigh | (Sweden) Patrik Hallberg | Peugeot 208 Rally4 | Driver, Co-driver, Junior ERC | HK |
| 44 | (Norway) Herman Lie-Nilsen | (Norway) Vegard Halland | (Hungary) HRT Racing Kft. | Peugeot 208 Rally4 | Driver, Co-driver, Team, Junior ERC | HK |

=== Itinerary ===
| Date | No. | Time | Stage name | Distance |
|---|---|---|---|---|
| 13 June | — | 11:00 | Bäck-Hult | 4.43 km |
| 13 June | SS1 | 20:05 | Bauhaus | 2.15 km |
| 14 June | SS2 | 7:51 | Grönlund 1 | 10.18 km |
| 14 June | SS3 | 8:37 | Bomdestad 1 | 11.74 km |
| 14 June | SS4 | 10:07 | Colins 1 | 6.43 km |
| 14 June | SS5 | 10:51 | Gårdsjö 1 | 12.09 km |
| 14 June | SS6 | 13:53 | Grönlund 2 | 10.18 km |
| 14 June | SS7 | 14:39 | Bomdestad 2 | 11.74 km |
| 14 June | SS8 | 16:09 | Colins 2 | 6.43 km |
| 14 June | SS9 | 16:53 | Gårdsjö 2 | 12.09 km |
| 15 June | SS10 | 7:42 | Ölme 1 | 5.83 km |
| 15 June | SS11 | 8:27 | Lungsund 1 | 20.20 km |
| 15 June | SS12 | 9:17 | Ängebäckstorp 1 | 14.76 km |
| 15 June | SS13 | 10:05 | Mölnbacka 1 | 13.19 km |
| 15 June | SS14 | 12:49 | Ölme 2 | 5.83 km |
| 15 June | SS15 | 13:34 | Lungsund 2 | 20.20 km |
| 15 June | SS16 | 14:24 | Ängebäckstorp 2 | 14.76 km |
| 15 June | SS17 | 16:05 | Mölnbacka 2 [Power Stage] | 13.19 km |

== Report ==
=== ERC Rally2 ===
==== Classification ====
| Position | | No. | Driver | Co-driver | Entrant | Car | Time | Difference | Points | |
| Event | Class | No. | Driver | Co-driver | Entrant | Car | Time | Difference | Event | Stage |
|---|---|---|---|---|---|---|---|---|---|---|
| 1 | 1 | 3 | Oliver Solberg | Elliott Edmondson | Oliver Solberg | Škoda Fabia RS Rally2 | 1:32:40.8 | 0.0 | 30 | 5 |
| 2 | 2 | 15 | Mikko Heikkilä | Kristian Temonen | Mikko Heikkilä | Toyota GR Yaris Rally2 | 1:33:18.8 | +38.0 | 24 | 4 |
| 3 | 3 | 1 | Hayden Paddon | John Kennard | BRC Racing Team | Hyundai i20 N Rally2 | 1:33:31.8 | +51.0 | 21 | 0 |
| 4 | 4 | 17 | Frank Tore Larsen | Lars-Håkon Lundgreen | Frank Tore Larsen | Volkswagen Polo GTI R5 | 1:34:09.5 | +1:28.7 | 19 | 2 |
| 5 | 5 | 10 | Mads Østberg | Patrik Barth | TRT Rally Team | Citroën C3 Rally2 | 1:34:14.6 | +1:33.8 | 17 | 3 |
| 6 | 6 | 14 | Mārtiņš Sesks | Renārs Francis | Team MRF Tyres | Toyota GR Yaris Rally2 | 1:34:22.5 | +1:41.7 | 15 | 0 |
| 7 | 7 | 19 | Isak Reiersen | Stefan Gustavsson | JC Raceteknik | Škoda Fabia RS Rally2 | 1:34:32.8 | +1:52.0 | 13 | 0 |
| 8 | 8 | 8 | Mikołaj Marczyk | Szymon Gospodarczyk | Mikołaj Marczyk | Škoda Fabia RS Rally2 | 1:34:50.5 | +2:09.7 | 11 | 1 |
| 9 | 9 | 9 | Andrea Mabellini | Virginia Lenzi | Team MRF Tyres | Škoda Fabia RS Rally2 | 1:35:13.6 | +2:32.8 | 9 | 0 |
| 10 | 10 | 5 | Simone Tempestini | Sergiu Itu | Simone Tempestini | Škoda Fabia RS Rally2 | 1:35:42.8 | +3:02.0 | 7 | 0 |
| 11 | 11 | 20 | Johan Kristoffersson | Stig Rune Skjærmoen | Kristofferson Motorsport | Volkswagen Polo GTI R5 | 1:35:43.3 | +3:02.5 | 5 | 0 |
| 12 | 12 | 21 | Kalle Gustafsson | Magnus Nilsson | Kalle Gustafsson | Ford Fiesta Rally2 | 1:36:08.9 | +3:28.1 | 4 | 0 |
| 13 | 13 | 11 | Filip Mareš | Radovan Bucha | ACCR Toyota Dolák | Toyota GR Yaris Rally2 | 1:36:26.9 | +3:46.1 | 3 | 0 |
| 14 | 14 | 2 | Efrén Llarena | Sara Fernández | Team MRF Tyres | Škoda Fabia RS Rally2 | 1:36:28.6 | +3:47.8 | 2 | 0 |
| 15 | 15 | 16 | Petter Solberg | Jonas Andersson | Petter Solberg | Volkswagen Polo GTI R5 | 1:38:42.9 | +6:02.1 | 1 | 0 |
| 16 | 16 | 12 | Giacomo Costenaro | Pietro Elia Ometto | Giacomo Costenaro | Škoda Fabia R5 | 1:40:17.2 | +7:36.4 | 0 | 0 |
| 20 | 17 | 24 | Bogdan Cuzma | Florin Dorca | Bogdan Cuzma | Škoda Fabia RS Rally2 | 1:43:27.4 | +10:46.6 | 0 | 0 |
| Retired SS17 | | 4 | Mathieu Franceschi | Andy Malfoy | Mathieu Franceschi | Škoda Fabia RS Rally2 | Rolled | | 0 | 0 |
| Retired SS16 | | 18 | Eyvind Brynildsen | Jørn Listerud | Eyvind Brynildsen | Volkswagen Polo GTI R5 | Mechanical | | 0 | 0 |
| Retired SS15 | | 7 | Jon Armstrong | Eoin Tracy | Jon Armstrong | Ford Fiesta Rally2 | Overheated engine | | 0 | 0 |
| Retired SS14 | | 22 | Christoffer Haglund | Johan Johansson | Christoffer Haglund | Volkswagen Polo GTI R5 | Medical reasons | | 0 | 0 |
| Retired SS12 | | 23 | Philip Allen | Dale Furniss | Philip Allen | Škoda Fabia RS Rally2 | Accident | | 0 | 0 |

==== Special stages ====
| Stage | Winners | Car | Time | Class leaders |
|---|---|---|---|---|
| SS1 | Paddon / Kennard | Hyundai i20 N Rally2 | 1:45.6 | Paddon / Kennard |
| SS2 | O. Solberg / Edmondson | Škoda Fabia RS Rally2 | 5:12.6 | Paddon / Kennard |
| SS3 | O. Solberg / Edmondson | Škoda Fabia RS Rally2 | 5:38.9 | O. Solberg / Edmondson |
| SS4 | Paddon / Kennard | Hyundai i20 N Rally2 | 3:27.0 | O. Solberg / Edmondson |
| SS5 | Paddon / Kennard | Hyundai i20 N Rally2 | 5:37.0 | O. Solberg / Edmondson |
| SS6 | O. Solberg / Edmondson | Škoda Fabia RS Rally2 | 5:02.7 | O. Solberg / Edmondson |
| SS7 | Heikkilä / Temonen | Toyota GR Yaris Rally2 | 5:36.2 | O. Solberg / Edmondson |
| SS8 | Franceschi / Malfoy | Škoda Fabia RS Rally2 | 3:24.5 | O. Solberg / Edmondson |
| SS9 | O. Solberg / Edmondson | Škoda Fabia RS Rally2 | 5:29.6 | O. Solberg / Edmondson |
| SS10 | O. Solberg / Edmondson | Škoda Fabia RS Rally2 | 2:58.5 | O. Solberg / Edmondson |
| SS11 | O. Solberg / Edmondson | Škoda Fabia RS Rally2 | 9:40.8 | O. Solberg / Edmondson |
| SS12 | O. Solberg / Edmondson | Škoda Fabia RS Rally2 | 7:13.2 | O. Solberg / Edmondson |
| SS13 | O. Solberg / Edmondson | Škoda Fabia RS Rally2 | 6:02.6 | O. Solberg / Edmondson |
| SS14 | O. Solberg / Edmondson | Škoda Fabia RS Rally2 | 2:55.1 | O. Solberg / Edmondson |
| SS15 | O. Solberg / Edmondson | Škoda Fabia RS Rally2 | 9:27.6 | O. Solberg / Edmondson |
| SS16 | O. Solberg / Edmondson | Škoda Fabia RS Rally2 | 7:05.7 | O. Solberg / Edmondson |
| SS17 | O. Solberg / Edmondson | Škoda Fabia RS Rally2 | 5:55.4 | O. Solberg / Edmondson |

==== Championship standings ====
| Pos. | Drivers' championships | | | Co-drivers' championships | | |
| Pos. | Move | Driver | Points | Move | Co-driver | Points |
|---|---|---|---|---|---|---|
| 1 | | Mathieu Franceschi | 56 | | Andy Malfoy | 56 |
| 2 | | Hayden Paddon | 56 | | John Kennard | 56 |
| 3 | | Simone Tempestini | 40 | | Sergiu Itu | 40 |
| 4 | New entry | Oliver Solberg | 35 | New entry | Elliott Edmondson | 35 |
| 5 | 1 | Yoann Bonato | 32 | 1 | Benjamin Boulloud | 32 |

=== ERC-3 Rally3 ===
==== Classification ====
| Position | | No. | Driver | Co-driver | Entrant | Car | Time | Difference | Points |
| Event | Class | No. | Driver | Co-driver | Entrant | Car | Time | Difference | Event |
|---|---|---|---|---|---|---|---|---|---|
| 17 | 1 | 27 | Filip Kohn | Tom Woodburn | Filip Kohn | Ford Fiesta Rally3 | 1:41:19.4 | 0.0 | 30 |
| 18 | 2 | 29 | Tristan Charpentier | Florian Barral | Tristan Charpentier | Ford Fiesta Rally3 | 1:41:30.8 | +11.4 | 24 |
| 21 | 3 | 26 | Kerem Kazaz | Andris Mālnieks | Atölye Kazaz | Ford Fiesta Rally3 | 1:43:29.4 | +2:10.0 | 21 |
| 23 | 4 | 25 | Igor Widłak | Daniel Dymurski | Grupa PGS RT | Ford Fiesta Rally3 | 1:44:14.2 | +2:54.8 | 19 |
| 28 | 5 | 28 | Martin Ravenščak | Dora Ravenščak | Martin Ravenščak | Ford Fiesta Rally3 | 1:48:18.6 | +6:59.2 | 17 |

==== Special stages ====
| Stage | Winners | Car | Time | Class leaders |
|---|---|---|---|---|
| SS1 | Charpentier / Barral | Ford Fiesta Rally3 | 1:53.2 | Charpentier / Barral |
| SS2 | Charpentier / Barral | Ford Fiesta Rally3 | 5:40.3 | Charpentier / Barral |
| SS3 | Kazaz / Mālnieks | Ford Fiesta Rally3 | 6:10.6 | Charpentier / Barral |
| SS4 | Kohn / Woodburn | Ford Fiesta Rally3 | 3:47.2 | Charpentier / Barral |
| SS5 | Kohn / Woodburn | Ford Fiesta Rally3 | 6:04.6 | Charpentier / Barral |
| SS6 | Charpentier / Barral | Ford Fiesta Rally3 | 5:31.4 | Charpentier / Barral |
| SS7 | Kohn / Woodburn | Ford Fiesta Rally3 | 6:08.9 | Kohn / Woodburn |
| SS8 | Charpentier / Barral | Ford Fiesta Rally3 | 3:47.6 | Kohn / Woodburn |
| SS9 | Kohn / Woodburn | Ford Fiesta Rally3 | 6:01.4 | Kohn / Woodburn |
| SS10 | Charpentier / Barral | Ford Fiesta Rally3 | 3:13.3 | Kohn / Woodburn |
| SS11 | Kohn / Woodburn | Ford Fiesta Rally3 | 10:27.4 | Kohn / Woodburn |
| SS12 | Charpentier / Barral | Ford Fiesta Rally3 | 7:58.8 | Kohn / Woodburn |
| SS13 | Kohn / Woodburn | Ford Fiesta Rally3 | 6:37.9 | Kohn / Woodburn |
| SS14 | Charpentier / Barral | Ford Fiesta Rally3 | 3:10.6 | Kohn / Woodburn |
| SS15 | Kohn / Woodburn | Ford Fiesta Rally3 | 10:19.9 | Kohn / Woodburn |
| SS16 | Kohn / Woodburn | Ford Fiesta Rally3 | 7:45.0 | Kohn / Woodburn |
| SS17 | Kohn / Woodburn | Ford Fiesta Rally3 | 6:33.3 | Kohn / Woodburn |

==== Championship standings ====
| Pos. | Drivers' championships | | | Co-drivers' championships | | |
| Pos. | Move | Driver | Points | Move | Co-driver | Points |
|---|---|---|---|---|---|---|
| 1 | | Igor Widłak | 73 | | Tom Woodburn | 60 |
| 2 | | Kerem Kazaz | 64 | | Daniel Dymurski | 49 |
| 3 | | Filip Kohn | 60 | 3 | Andris Mālnieks | 40 |
| 4 | | Martin Ravenščak | 38 | 1 | Dora Ravenščak | 38 |
| 5 | New entry | Tristan Charpentier | 24 | 2 | Michał Marczewski | 24 |

=== ERC-4 Rally4 ===
==== Classification ====
| Position | | No. | Driver | Co-driver | Entrant | Car | Time | Difference | Points |
| Event | Class | No. | Driver | Co-driver | Entrant | Car | Time | Difference | Event |
|---|---|---|---|---|---|---|---|---|---|
| 19 | 1 | 30 | Mille Johansson | Johan Grönvall | IK Sport Racing | Opel Corsa Rally4 | 1:43:02.6 | 0.0 | 30 |
| 22 | 2 | 35 | Calle Carlberg | Jørgen Eriksen | ADAC Opel Rallye Junior Team | Opel Corsa Rally4 | 1:43:35.2 | +32.6 | 24 |
| 24 | 3 | 38 | Karl-Markus Sei | Martin Leotoots | ALM Motorsport | Peugeot 208 Rally4 | 1:45:08.5 | +2:05.9 | 21 |
| 25 | 4 | 33 | Daniel Polášek | Zdeněk Omelka | Daniel Polášek | Peugeot 208 Rally4 | 1:46:05.3 | +3:02.7 | 19 |
| 26 | 5 | 36 | Timo Schulz | Michael Wenzel | ADAC Opel Rallye Junior Team | Opel Corsa Rally4 | 1:46:46.9 | +3:44.3 | 17 |
| 27 | 6 | 39 | Patrik Herczig | Kristóf Varga | HRT Racing Kft. | Peugeot 208 Rally4 | 1:46:52.1 | +3:49.5 | 15 |
| 29 | 7 | 32 | Aoife Raftery | Hannah McKillop | Motorsport Ireland Rally Academy | Peugeot 208 Rally4 | 1:48:23.1 | +5:20.5 | 13 |
| 30 | 8 | 44 | Herman Lie-Nilsen | Vegard Halland | HRT Racing Kft. | Peugeot 208 Rally4 | 1:51:15.4 | +8:12.8 | 11 |
| 31 | 9 | 31 | Max McRae | Cameron Fair | TRT Rally Team | Peugeot 208 Rally4 | 3:11:06.5 | +1:28:03.9 | 9 |
| Retired SS14 | | 37 | Davide Pesavento | Flavio Zanella | Davide Pesavento | Peugeot 208 Rally4 | Accident | | 0 |
| Retired SS12 | | 43 | Patrik Hallberg | John Stigh | Patrik Hallberg | Peugeot 208 Rally4 | Accident | | 0 |
| Retired SS11 | | 41 | Mattia Zanin | Elia De Guio | Mattia Zanin | Peugeot 208 Rally4 | Accident | | 0 |
| Retired SS7 | | 34 | Liam Müller | Alexander Hirsch | Liam Müller | Opel Corsa Rally4 | Accident | | 0 |
| Retired SS2 | | 40 | Geronimo Nerobutto | Alessio Angeli | Geronimo Nerobutto | Peugeot 208 Rally4 | Accident | | 0 |

==== Special stages ====
| Stage | Winners | Car | Time | Class leaders |
|---|---|---|---|---|
| SS1 | Hallberg / Stigh | Peugeot 208 Rally4 | 1:56.6 | Hallberg / Stigh |
| SS2 | Johansson / Grönvall | Opel Corsa Rally4 | 5:38.8 | Johansson / Grönvall |
| SS3 | Johansson / Grönvall | Opel Corsa Rally4 | 6:13.5 | Johansson / Grönvall |
| SS4 | Hallberg / Stigh | Peugeot 208 Rally4 | 3:52.3 | Hallberg / Stigh |
| SS5 | Johansson / Grönvall | Opel Corsa Rally4 | 6:08.9 | Hallberg / Stigh |
| SS6 | Hallberg / Stigh | Peugeot 208 Rally4 | 5:32.1 | Hallberg / Stigh |
| SS7 | Hallberg / Stigh | Peugeot 208 Rally4 | 6:15.2 | Hallberg / Stigh |
| SS8 | Pesavento / Zanella | Peugeot 208 Rally4 | 3:54.7 | Hallberg / Stigh |
| SS9 | Johansson / Grönvall | Opel Corsa Rally4 | 6:05.1 | Hallberg / Stigh |
| SS10 | Pesavento / Zanella | Peugeot 208 Rally4 | 3:17.0 | Hallberg / Stigh |
| SS11 | Johansson / Grönvall | Opel Corsa Rally4 | 10:34.9 | Hallberg / Stigh |
| SS12 | McRae / Fair | Peugeot 208 Rally4 | 8:04.8 | Johansson / Grönvall |
| SS13 | Johansson / Grönvall | Opel Corsa Rally4 | 6:40.2 | Johansson / Grönvall |
| SS14 | Carlberg / Eriksen | Opel Corsa Rally4 | 3:15.8 | Johansson / Grönvall |
| SS15 | Johansson / Grönvall | Opel Corsa Rally4 | 10:27.4 | Johansson / Grönvall |
| SS16 | Johansson / Grönvall | Opel Corsa Rally4 | 7:53.7 | Johansson / Grönvall |
| SS17 | McRae / Fair | Peugeot 208 Rally4 | 6:41.5 | Johansson / Grönvall |

==== Championship standings ====
| Pos. | Drivers' championships | | | Co-drivers' championships | | |
| Pos. | Move | Driver | Points | Move | Co-driver | Points |
|---|---|---|---|---|---|---|
| 1 | 1 | Mille Johansson | 79 | 1 | Johan Grönvall | 79 |
| 2 | 1 | Max McRae | 58 | 1 | Cameron Fair | 58 |
| 3 | 1 | Calle Carlberg | 48 | 1 | Jørgen Eriksen | 48 |
| 4 | 2 | Daniel Polášek | 43 | 2 | Zdeněk Omelka | 43 |
| 5 | 2 | Aoife Raftery | 39 | 2 | Michael Wenzel | 39 |

=== Junior ERC Rally4 ===
==== Classification ====
| Position | | No. | Driver | Co-driver | Entrant | Car | Time | Difference | Points |
| Event | Class | No. | Driver | Co-driver | Entrant | Car | Time | Difference | Event |
|---|---|---|---|---|---|---|---|---|---|
| 19 | 1 | 30 | Mille Johansson | Johan Grönvall | IK Sport Racing | Opel Corsa Rally4 | 1:43:02.6 | 0.0 | 30 |
| 22 | 2 | 35 | Calle Carlberg | Jørgen Eriksen | ADAC Opel Rallye Junior Team | Opel Corsa Rally4 | 1:43:35.2 | +32.6 | 24 |
| 24 | 3 | 38 | Karl-Markus Sei | Martin Leotoots | ALM Motorsport | Peugeot 208 Rally4 | 1:45:08.5 | +2:05.9 | 21 |
| 25 | 4 | 33 | Daniel Polášek | Zdeněk Omelka | Daniel Polášek | Peugeot 208 Rally4 | 1:46:05.3 | +3:02.7 | 19 |
| 26 | 5 | 36 | Timo Schulz | Michael Wenzel | ADAC Opel Rallye Junior Team | Opel Corsa Rally4 | 1:46:46.9 | +3:44.3 | 17 |
| 27 | 6 | 39 | Patrik Herczig | Kristóf Varga | HRT Racing Kft. | Peugeot 208 Rally4 | 1:46:52.1 | +3:49.5 | 15 |
| 29 | 7 | 32 | Aoife Raftery | Hannah McKillop | Motorsport Ireland Rally Academy | Peugeot 208 Rally4 | 1:48:23.1 | +5:20.5 | 13 |
| 30 | 8 | 44 | Herman Lie-Nilsen | Vegard Halland | HRT Racing Kft. | Peugeot 208 Rally4 | 1:51:15.4 | +8:12.8 | 11 |
| 31 | 9 | 31 | Max McRae | Cameron Fair | TRT Rally Team | Peugeot 208 Rally4 | 3:11:06.5 | +1:28:03.9 | 9 |
| Retired SS14 | | 37 | Davide Pesavento | Flavio Zanella | Davide Pesavento | Peugeot 208 Rally4 | Accident | | 0 |
| Retired SS12 | | 43 | Patrik Hallberg | John Stigh | Patrik Hallberg | Peugeot 208 Rally4 | Accident | | 0 |
| Retired SS11 | | 41 | Mattia Zanin | Elia De Guio | Mattia Zanin | Peugeot 208 Rally4 | Accident | | 0 |
| Retired SS7 | | 34 | Liam Müller | Alexander Hirsch | Liam Müller | Opel Corsa Rally4 | Accident | | 0 |
| Retired SS2 | | 40 | Geronimo Nerobutto | Alessio Angeli | Geronimo Nerobutto | Peugeot 208 Rally4 | Accident | | 0 |

==== Special stages ====
| Stage | Winners | Car | Time | Class leaders |
|---|---|---|---|---|
| SS1 | Hallberg / Stigh | Peugeot 208 Rally4 | 1:56.6 | Hallberg / Stigh |
| SS2 | Johansson / Grönvall | Opel Corsa Rally4 | 5:38.8 | Johansson / Grönvall |
| SS3 | Johansson / Grönvall | Opel Corsa Rally4 | 6:13.5 | Johansson / Grönvall |
| SS4 | Hallberg / Stigh | Peugeot 208 Rally4 | 3:52.3 | Hallberg / Stigh |
| SS5 | Johansson / Grönvall | Opel Corsa Rally4 | 6:08.9 | Hallberg / Stigh |
| SS6 | Hallberg / Stigh | Peugeot 208 Rally4 | 5:32.1 | Hallberg / Stigh |
| SS7 | Hallberg / Stigh | Peugeot 208 Rally4 | 6:15.2 | Hallberg / Stigh |
| SS8 | Pesavento / Zanella | Peugeot 208 Rally4 | 3:54.7 | Hallberg / Stigh |
| SS9 | Johansson / Grönvall | Opel Corsa Rally4 | 6:05.1 | Hallberg / Stigh |
| SS10 | Pesavento / Zanella | Peugeot 208 Rally4 | 3:17.0 | Hallberg / Stigh |
| SS11 | Johansson / Grönvall | Opel Corsa Rally4 | 10:34.9 | Hallberg / Stigh |
| SS12 | McRae / Fair | Peugeot 208 Rally4 | 8:04.8 | Johansson / Grönvall |
| SS13 | Johansson / Grönvall | Opel Corsa Rally4 | 6:40.2 | Johansson / Grönvall |
| SS14 | Carlberg / Eriksen | Opel Corsa Rally4 | 3:15.8 | Johansson / Grönvall |
| SS15 | Johansson / Grönvall | Opel Corsa Rally4 | 10:27.4 | Johansson / Grönvall |
| SS16 | Johansson / Grönvall | Opel Corsa Rally4 | 7:53.7 | Johansson / Grönvall |
| SS17 | McRae / Fair | Peugeot 208 Rally4 | 6:41.5 | Johansson / Grönvall |

==== Championship standings ====
| Pos. | Drivers' championships | | |
| Pos. | Move | Driver | Points |
|---|---|---|---|
| 1 | | Mille Johansson | 81 |
| 2 | | Max McRae | 58 |
| 3 | 3 | Calle Carlberg | 48 |
| 4 | 1 | Daniel Polášek | 43 |
| 5 | 2 | Aoife Raftery | 39 |
