= Mikołaj Marczyk =

Polish rally driver

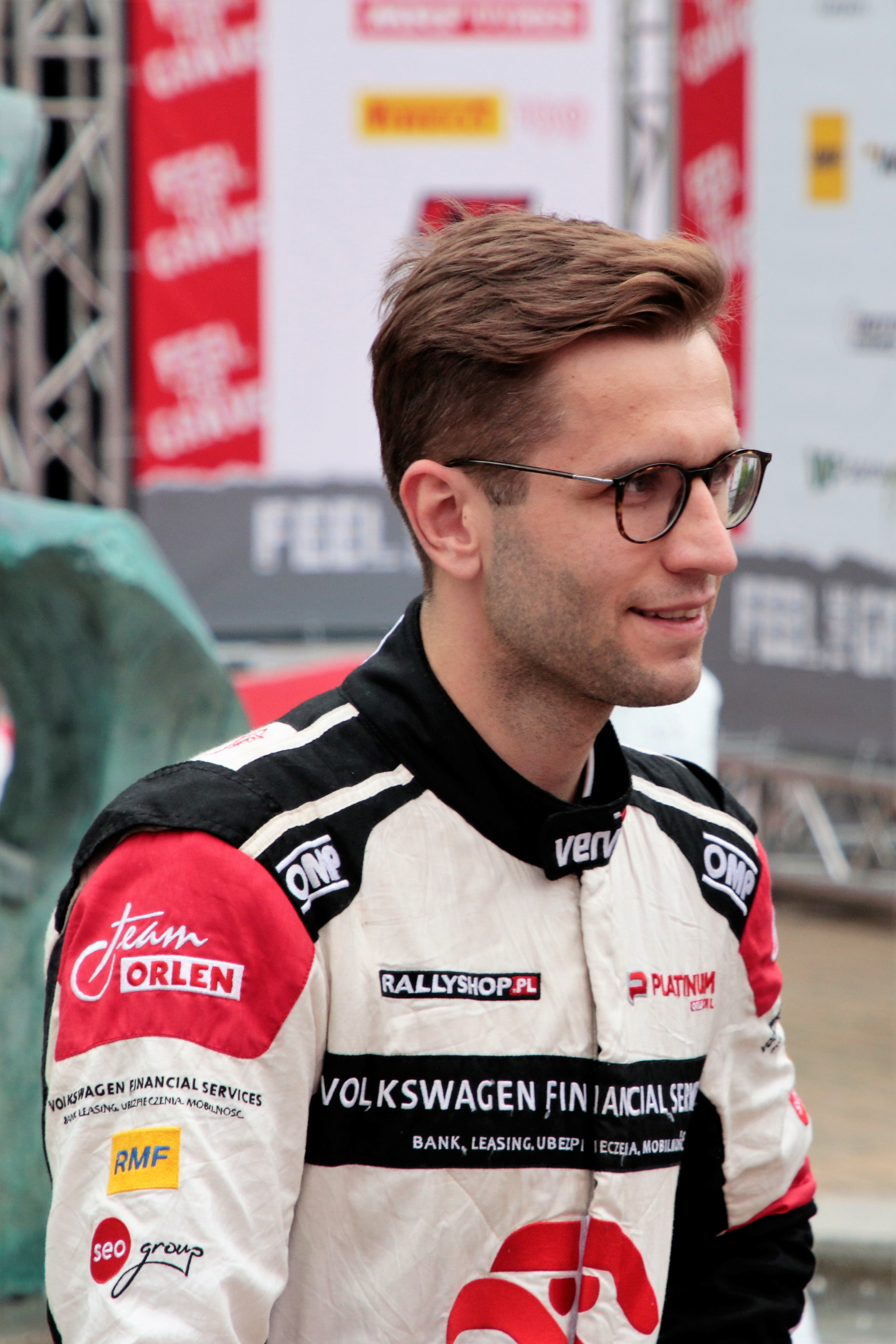
- Marczyk at the 2022 Rally Poland

Personal information
- Nationality: (Poland) Polish
- Born: 24 October 1995 (age 31); Łódź, Poland

World Rally Championship record
- Years active: 2022–present
- Co-driver: Szymon Gospodarczyk
- Rallies: 14
- Championships: 0
- Rally wins: 0
- Podiums: 0
- Stage wins: 0
- Total points: 4
- First rally: 2022 Croatia Rally

Mikołaj Marczyk (Polish pronunciation: [miˈkɔ.waj ˈmar.t͡ʂɨk]; born 24 October 1995) is a Polish rally driver. He won the Polish Rally Championship in 2019 and 2021 before winning the European Rally Championship in 2025.

== Rally results ==
=== WRC results ===
Year	Entrant	Car	1	2	3	4	5	6	7	8	9	10	11	12	13	Pos.	Points
2022	Mikołaj Marczyk	Škoda Fabia Rally2 evo	MON	SWE	CRO; 16	POR; 13	ITA; 15	KEN	EST; 31	FIN; 14	BEL	GRE	NZL	ESP; 20	JPN	NC	0
2023	Mikołaj Marczyk	Škoda Fabia RS Rally2	MON	SWE	MEX	CRO	POR; 14	ITA; 9	KEN	EST; 13	FIN; 13	GRE; 16	CHL	EUR; 15	JPN	23rd	2
2024	Mikołaj Marczyk	Škoda Fabia RS Rally2	MON	SWE	KEN	CRO	POR	ITA	POL; 18	LAT	FIN	GRE	CHL	EUR; 9	JPN	30th	2

=== ERC results ===
Year	Entrant	Car	1	2	3	4	5	6	7	8	Pos.	Points
2018	Škoda Polska Motorsport	Škoda Fabia R5	PRT	ESP	GRC	CYP	ITA	CZE	POL; 5	LVA	25th	15
2019	Škoda Polska Motorsport	Škoda Fabia R5	PRT	ESP	LAT	POL; 9	ITA	CZE; Ret	CYP	HUN	35th	6
2020	Orlen Team	Škoda Fabia Rally2 evo	ITA; 10	LAT; 12	PRT; 4	HUN; 15	ESP; 9				8th	43
2021	Orlen Team	Škoda Fabia Rally2 evo	POL; 3	LAT; 6	ITA; 5	CZE; 5	PRT1; 5	PRT2; 9	HUN; 2	ESP; 3	3rd	151
2022	Orlen Team	Škoda Fabia Rally2 evo	PRT1	PRT2	ESP1	POL; 1	LAT	ITA	CZE	ESP2	17th	30
2023	Mikołaj Marczyk	Škoda Fabia RS Rally2	PRT; 4	CAN	POL; 3	LAT	SWE	ITA	CZE	HUN; 18	12th	44
2024	Mikołaj Marczyk	Škoda Fabia RS Rally2	HUN; 6	CAN; 7	SWE; 8	EST; 7	ITA; 11	CZE; 7	GBR; 4	POL; 4	3rd	109
2025	Mikołaj Marczyk	Škoda Fabia RS Rally2	ESP; 5	HUN; 3	SWE; 7	POL; 2	ITA; 3	CZE; 7	GBR; 3	CRO; 3	1st	154
