= Opel Corsa Rally4 =

Opel Rally4 rally car

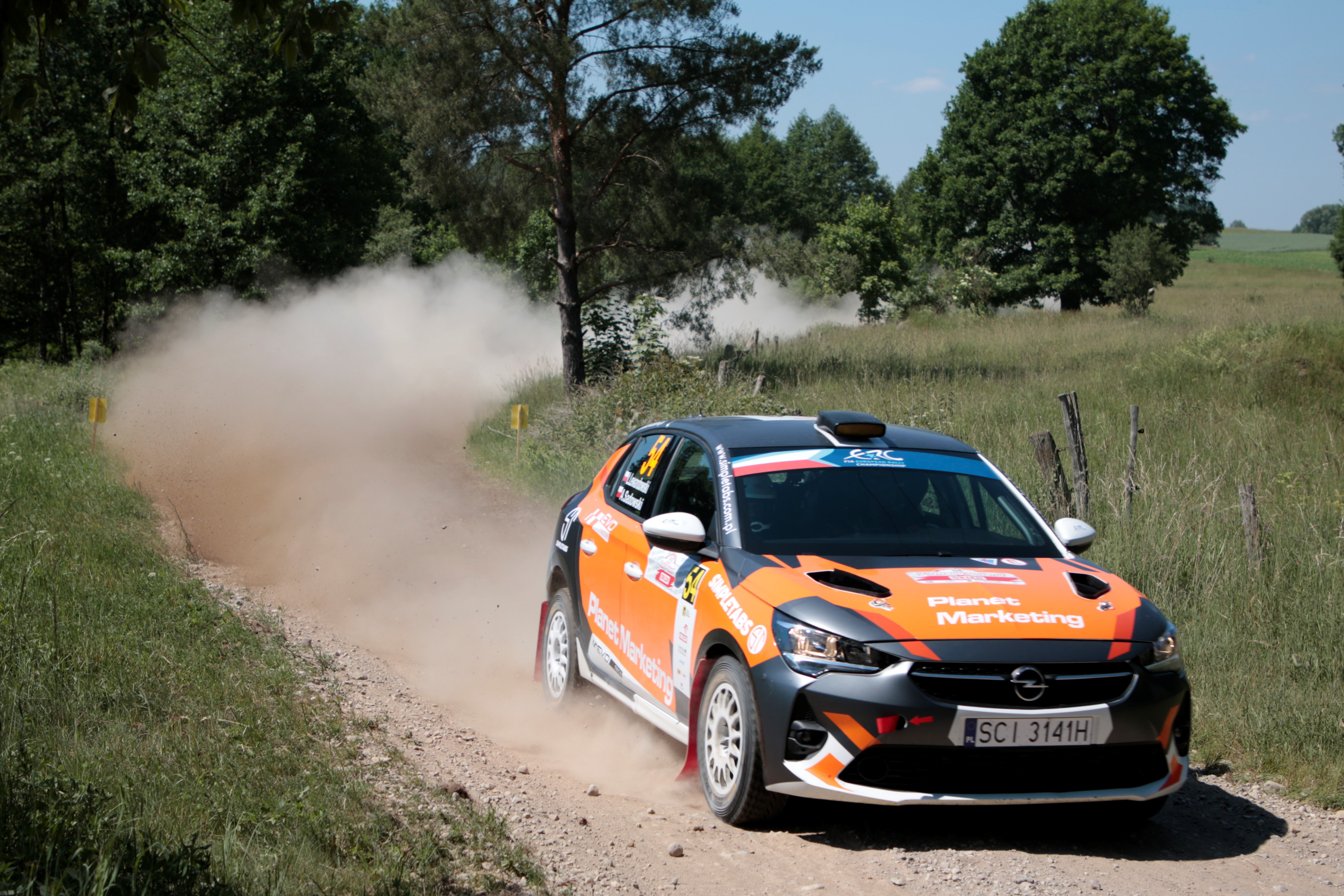
- A Corsa Rally4 at the 2021 Rally Poland
- Category: Group Rally4
- Constructor: Opel
- Designers: Jörg Schrott (Director, Opel Motorsport)
- Predecessor: Opel Adam R2

Technical specifications
- Engine: PSA 1.2 L (73 cu in) 3-cylinder, 12-valve turbocharged front transverse, front-wheel-drive
- Transmission: 5-speed sequential 2-wheel drive
- Power: 212 hp (158 kW; 215 PS)
- Weight: 1,080 kg (2,381 lb)

Competition history
- Notable drivers: (Sweden) Calle Carlberg (Sweden) Mille Johansson (France) Laurent Pellier (Germany) Timo Schulz
- Debut: (Denmark) 2021 Rally Himmerland
Wins
18 (ERC4 & Junior ERC)

The Opel Corsa Rally4 is a rally car developed and built by Opel Motorsport to FIA Group Rally4 regulations and for use in the fourth tier of the Rally Pyramid. It is based upon the Opel Corsa road car and is the successor of Opel Adam R2.

== Rally victories ==
=== European Rally Championship-4 ===
Year	No.	Event	Surface	Driver	Co-driver
2022	1	(Spain) 2022 Rally Islas Canarias	Tarmac	(France) Laurent Pellier	(France) Marine Pelamourgues
2022	2	2022 Rally Poland	Gravel	(France) Laurent Pellier	(France) Marine Pelamourgues
2022	3	(Italy) 2022 Rally di Roma Capitale	Tarmac	(France) Laurent Pellier	(France) Marine Pelamourgues
2022	4	(Czech Republic) 2022 Barum Czech Rally Zlín	Tarmac	(France) Laurent Pellier	(France) Marine Pelamourgues
2022	5	(Spain) 2022 Rally Catalunya	Tarmac	(France) Laurent Pellier	(France) Marine Pelamourgues
2023	6	(Czech Republic) 2023 Barum Czech Rally Zlín	Tarmac	(Germany) Timo Schulz	(Germany) Michael Wenzel
2024	7	(Spain) 2024 Rally Islas Canarias	Tarmac	(Sweden) Mille Johansson	(Sweden) Johan Grönvall
2024	8	(Sweden) 2024 Royal Rally of Scandinavia	Gravel	(Sweden) Mille Johansson	(Sweden) Johan Grönvall
2024	9	(Poland) 2024 Rally Silesia	Tarmac	(Sweden) Calle Carlberg	(Norway) Jørgen Eriksen

=== Junior European Rally Championship ===
Year	No.	Event	Surface	Driver	Co-driver
2022 (Note: The championship was referred to as ERC4 Junior.)	1	(Spain) 2022 Rally Islas Canarias	Tarmac	(France) Laurent Pellier	(France) Marine Pelamourgues
2022	2	2022 Rally Poland	Gravel	(France) Laurent Pellier	(France) Marine Pelamourgues
2022	3	(Italy) 2022 Rally di Roma Capitale	Tarmac	(France) Laurent Pellier	(France) Marine Pelamourgues
2022	4	(Czech Republic) 2022 Barum Czech Rally Zlín	Tarmac	(France) Laurent Pellier	(France) Marine Pelamourgues
2022	5	(Spain) 2022 Rally Catalunya	Tarmac	(France) Laurent Pellier	(France) Marine Pelamourgues
2023	6	(Czech Republic) 2023 Barum Czech Rally Zlín	Tarmac	(Germany) Timo Schulz	(Germany) Michael Wenzel
2024	7	(Spain) 2024 Rally Islas Canarias	Tarmac	(Sweden) Mille Johansson	(Sweden) Johan Grönvall
2024	8	(Sweden) 2024 Royal Rally of Scandinavia	Gravel	(Sweden) Mille Johansson	(Sweden) Johan Grönvall
2024	9	(Poland) 2024 Rally Silesia	Tarmac	(Sweden) Calle Carlberg	(Norway) Jørgen Eriksen
