= Királyszentistván =

- Flag Coat of arms

- Location of Veszprém county in Hungary

- Location of Királyszentistván
- Coordinates: 47.10895°N 18.04549°E
- Country: Hungary
- County: Veszprém

Area
  - Total: 8.91 km^{2} (3.44 sq mi)
- Elevation: 147 m (482 ft)

Population (2004)
  - Total: 450
  - Density: 50.5/km^{2} (131/sq mi)
- Time zone: UTC+1 (CET)
  - Summer (DST): UTC+2 (CEST)
- Postal code: 8195
- Area code: 88

Királyszentistván is a village in Veszprém county, Hungary.
