= 1982 Rallye de Portugal =

1982 Rally of Portugal 16º Rallye de Portugal Vinho do Porto
Round 1 of the 1982 World Rally Championship
← Previous event	Next event →
- Host country: Portugal
- Rally base: Estoril
- Dates run: March 3 – 6 1982
- Stages: 40 (639 km; 397 miles)
- Stage surface: Gravel and tarmac
- Overall distance: 2,313 km (1,437 miles)

Statistics
- Crews: 91 at start, 23 at finish

Overall results
- Overall winner: (France) Michèle Mouton (Italy) Fabrizia Pons (Germany) Audi Sport (Germany) Audi Quattro

The 1982 Rally of Portugal (formally the 16º Rallye de Portugal Vinho do Porto) was the third round of the 1982 World Rally Championship season, after the Monte Carlo and Swedish rallies. It was the second event in the Championship of Makes, as the Swedish Rally did not count towards the Manufacturers' Championship.

== Report ==
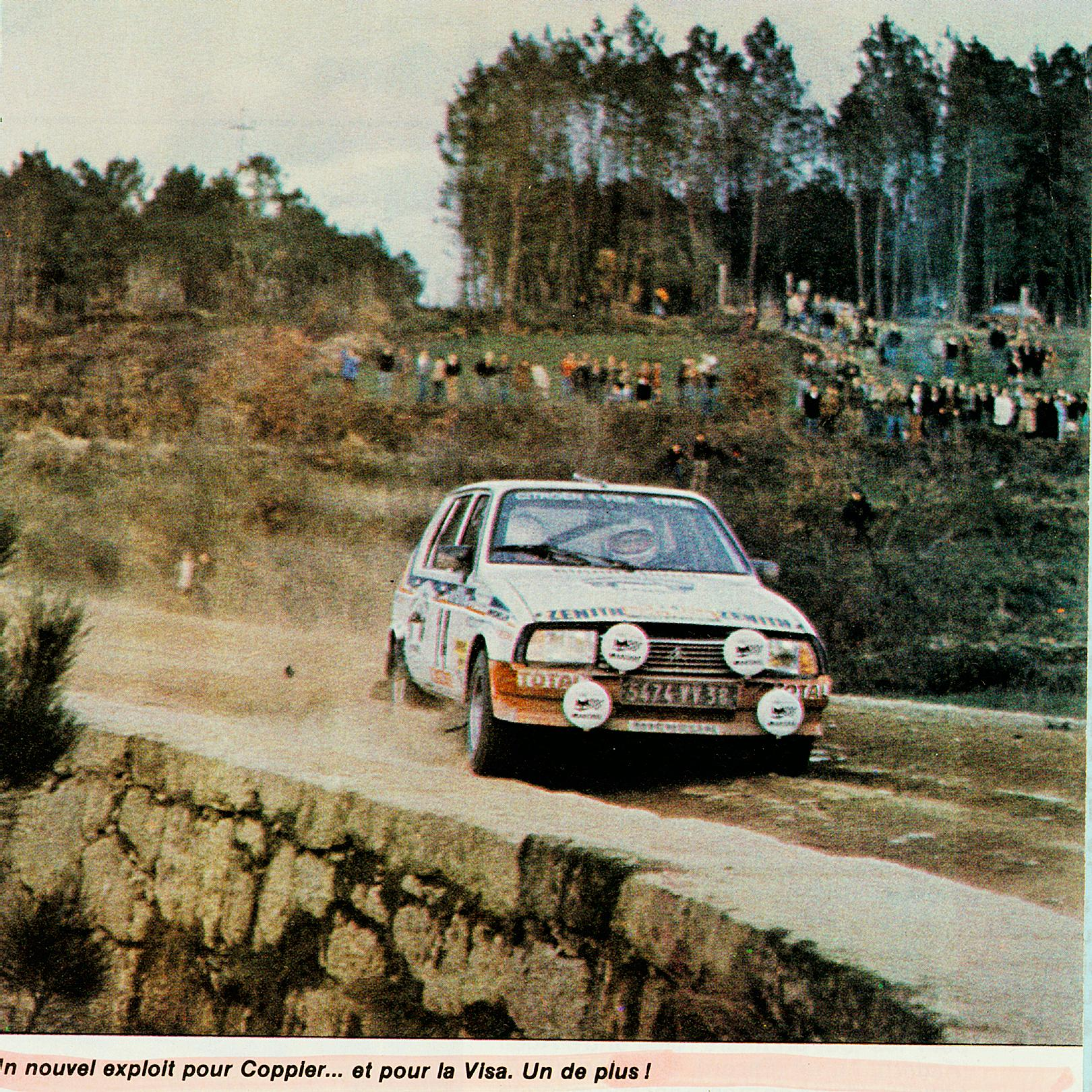
The fifth-place finishing Citroën Visa Trophée of Alain Coppier

Michèle Mouton dominated a rally with lots of mechanical retirements; seven out of ten factory team starters did not finish. Only 23 of the 91 starters (the 92nd entrant, Belgian Claude Reusch, overslept and missed the start) were classified in the end. Second place went to Swede Per Eklund in a somewhat outdated Toyota Celica, scheduled to be the RA45's final factory outing. Franz Wittmann, Sr. finished third in the second works' Audi.

Henri Toivonen put on a good show in his Ascona 400, being a spectator favourite, but a series of technical failures (changing the rear axle twice) pushed him as far back as 18th. A succession of four fastest times brought him back up to fifth, but a broken clutch ended his race with four special stages left. His teammate Walter Röhrl crashed out after his steering failed. All of the Nissans (Salonen, Pond, Mendes) broke down, the differential failed in Björn Waldegård's Celica, and the front suspension collapsed on Jean-Luc Thérier's Alméras-Porsche 911 SC. Six out of six of the new 1.2-liter, Group B Citroën Visa Trophées reached the finish; in part because of the large number of retirements, the best one gained a fifth position – ahead of some significantly more powerful cars.

== Results ==
Final standings:

Pos.	Driver	Co-driver	Car	Group	Starting no./Registration	Time	Difference	Points
1982 Rallye de Portugal results
1.	(France) Michèle Mouton	(Italy) Fabrizia Pons	Audi Quattro	4/4	7 / IN-NH 42	7:39:36	0.0	20
2.	(Sweden) Per Eklund	(Sweden) Ragnar Spjuth	Toyota Celica 2000GT (RA45)	4/3	8 / K-RV 661	7:52:43	13:07	15
3.	(Austria) Franz Wittmann Sr.	(Germany) Peter Diekmann	Audi Quattro	4/4	18 / IN-NL 88	8:07:25	27:49	12
4.	(Portugal) Carlos Torres	(Portugal) Filipe Lopes	Ford Escort RS 1800 MkII	4/3	10 / VWL 200R	8:30:58	51:22	10
5.	(France) Alain Coppier	(France) Josépha Laloz	Citroën Visa Trophée	B9	14 / 5474 VV 38	8:54:11	1:14:35	8
6.	(Portugal) Mário Silva	(Portugal) Bevilacqua Rui	Ford Escort RS 1800 MkII	4/3	19 / DM-49-88	9:01:12	1:21:36	6
7.	(Portugal) António Ferreira da Cunha	(Portugal) Resende Carlos	Opel Ascona 2000i	2/3	48 / NE-D 391	9:29:09	1:49:33	4
8.	(France) Christian Dorche	(France) Patricia Trivero	Citroën Visa Trophée	B9	27 / 6676 SN 35	9:35:39	1:56:03	3
9.	(France) Olivier Tabatoni	(France) Michel Cadier	Citroën Visa Trophée	B9	59 / 341 KB 13	9:40:36	2:01:00	2
10.	(Brazil) Jorge Fleck	(Brazil) Silvio Klein	Opel Kadett GT/E	2/3	16 / AV-76-92	9:40:55	2:01:19	1
11.	(France) Michel Marie	(Portugal) Carlos Duarte	Citroën Visa Trophée	B9	61 /	9:54:47	2:15:11	
12.	(Portugal) António Segurado	(Portugal) Pedro Sena	Ford Escort RS 2000 MkII	A7	83 / GZ-66-28	9:56:37	2:17:01	
13.	(France) Jean-Yves Le Masson	(France) Joseph Pascal	Volkswagen Golf GTi	A6	84 /	9:57:51	2:18:15	
14.	(France) Stéphane Neyret	(France) Antoine Marnas	Citroën Visa Trophée	B9	58 /	10:12:23	2:32:47	
15.	(Japan) Masaaki Kawahara	(Japan) Shinya Ishikawa	Datsun 280ZX	4	25 /	10:18:59	2:39:23	
16.	(France) Jean-Luc Marteil	(France) Bernard Marchais	Citroën Visa Trophée	B9	60 / 4622 PK 78	10:28:54	2:49:18	
17.	(Portugal) José Manuel Tavares	(Portugal) António Durães	Datsun 120Y	2	95 /	10:37:46	2:58:10	
18.	(Germany) Ewald Klein	(Germany) Jürgen Schneider	Honda Civic	A5	79 / WIL-R 464	10:46:42	3:07:06	
19.	(Portugal) Manuel Mello Breyner	(Portugal) João Aragão Teixeira	Peugeot 104 ZS2	N2	64 / FI-02-33	10:53:09	3:13:33	
20.	(Germany) Nicolas Stürken	(Portugal) João Reis	Ford Escort RS 2000 MkII	A7	72 / K-AH 1553	10:57:07	3:17:31	
21.	(Switzerland) Michel Malherbe	(France) Vivien De Climens	Volkswagen Golf GTi	A6	56 /	11:10:22	3:30:46	
22.	(Portugal) Pinto Mendes	(Portugal) Carlos Costa	Honda Civic	A5	66 / CM-92-34	11:44:02	4:04:26	
23.	(France) Robert Guieu	(France) Maurice Lebre	Peugeot 104 ZS	2	94 /	11:57:15	4:17:39	

== Championship standings after the event ==
Makers' Championship standings
Rank	Manufacturer	Event										Total points
Rank	Manufacturer	(Monaco) MON	(Portugal) POR	(Kenya) KEN	(France) FRA	(Greece) GRC	(New Zealand) NZL	(Brazil) BRA	(Finland) FIN	(Italy) ITA	(United Kingdom) GBR	Total points
1	(Germany) Audi	16	18									34
2	(Germany) Opel	18	12									30
3	(Japan) Toyota	-	16									16
4	(France) Citroën	-	14									14
4	(Germany) Porsche	14	-									14
6	(United Kingdom) Ford	-	12									12
7	(France) Renault	10	-									10

Drivers' Championship standings
Rank	Driver	Event												Total points
Rank	Driver	(Monaco) MON	(Sweden) SWE	(Portugal) POR	(Kenya) KEN	(France) FRA	(Greece) GRC	(New Zealand) NZL	(Brazil) BRA	(Finland) FIN	(Italy) ITA	(Ivory Coast) CIV	(United Kingdom) GBR	Total points
1	(West Germany) Walter Röhrl	20	12	–										32
2	(France) Michèle Mouton	–	8	20										28
3	(Sweden) Per Eklund	–	10	15										25
4	(Sweden) Stig Blomqvist	–	20	–										20
5	(Finland) Hannu Mikkola	15	–	–										15
5	(Finland) Ari Vatanen	–	15	–										15
7	(France) Jean-Luc Thérier	12	–	–										12
7	(Austria) Franz Wittmann	–	–	12										12
8	(France) Guy Fréquelin	10	–	–										10
8	(Portugal) Carlos Torres	–	–	10										10
10	(France) Bruno Saby	8	–	–										8
10	(France) Alain Coppier	–	–	8										8
12	(France) Dany Snobeck	6	–	–										6
12	(Finland) Lasse Lampi	–	6	–										6
12	(Portugal) Mário Silva	–	–	6										6
15	(West Germany) Jochi Kleint	4	–	–										4
15	(Sweden) Sören Nilsson	–	4	–										4
15	(Portugal) António Ferreira da Cunha	–	–	4										4
18	(France) Philippe Touren	3	–	–										3
18	(Sweden) Kalle Grundel	–	3	–										3
18	(France) Christian Dorche	–	–	3										3
21	(France) Jean-Pierre Ballet	2	–	–										2
21	(Sweden) Bengt Thorsell	–	2	–										2
21	(France) Olivier Tabatoni	–	–	2										2
24	(West Germany) Jürgen Barth	1	–	–										1
24	(Sweden) Mikael Ericsson	–	1	–										1
24	(Brazil) Jorge Fleck	–	–	1										1
