= Opel Rally Team =

Auto racing team

- Full name: Opel Rally Team
- Base: Germany
- Chassis: Opel Kadett GT/E, Opel Ascona 400, Opel Manta 400, Opel Kadett GSi

World Rally Championship history
- Debut: 1982 Monte Carlo Rally
- Last event: 1990 RAC Rally
- Manufacturers' Championships: 0
- Drivers' Championships: 1 (1982)
- Rally wins: 6

Opel Rally Team was an auto racing team by German car manufacturer Opel. It competed at the World Rally Championship from 1982 to 1990. Walter Röhrl won the drivers championship in 1982 with Opel.

== Results ==
Year	Entrant	Car	Driver	1	2	3	4	5	6	7	8	9	10	11	12	WDC	Points	WMC	Points
1982	Rothmans Opel Rally Team	Opel Ascona 400	(Germany) Walter Röhrl	MON; 1	SWE; 3	POR; Ret	KEN; 2	FRA; 4	GRE; 2	NZL; 3	BRA; 2	FIN	ITA; 3	CIV; 1	GBR	1st	109	2nd	104
1982	Rothmans Opel Rally Team	Opel Ascona 400	(Germany) Jochi Kleint	MON; 7	SWE	POR	KEN	FRA; Ret	GRE	NZL	BRA	FIN	ITA	CIV	GBR; Ret	41st	2	2nd	104
1982	Rothmans Opel Rally Team	Opel Ascona 400	(Finland) Henri Toivonen	MON	SWE	POR; Ret	KEN	FRA	GRE; 3	NZL	BRA	FIN; Ret	ITA; 5	CIV	GBR; 3	7th	32	2nd	104
1982	Rothmans Opel Rally Team	Opel Ascona 400	(Finland) Rauno Aaltonen	MON	SWE	POR	KEN; Ret	FRA	GRE	NZL	BRA	FIN	ITA	CIV	GBR	-	0	2nd	104
1982	Rothmans Opel Rally Team	Opel Ascona 400	(United Kingdom) Jimmy McRae	MON	SWE	POR	KEN	FRA	GRE; 6	NZL	BRA	FIN	ITA	CIV	GBR; Ret	33rd	6	2nd	104
1982	Rothmans Opel Rally Team	Opel Ascona 400	(Finland) Ari Vatanen	MON	SWE	POR	KEN	FRA	GRE	NZL	BRA	FIN	ITA	CIV	GBR; Ret	13th*	15*	2nd	104
1982	Rothmans Opel Rally Team	Opel Ascona 400	(Sweden) Björn Johansson	MON	SWE	POR	KEN	FRA	GRE	NZL	BRA	FIN	ITA	CIV; Ret	GBR	-	0	2nd	104
1982	Opel Team Sweden	Opel Ascona 400	(Sweden) Björn Johansson	MON	SWE; Ret	POR	KEN	FRA	GRE	NZL	BRA	FIN; Ret	ITA		GBR; 13	-	0	2nd	104
1983	Rothmans Opel Rally Team	Opel Ascona 400	(Finland) Ari Vatanen	MON; 5	SWE; 6	POR	KEN; 1	FRA								6th	44	3rd	87
1983	Rothmans Opel Rally Team	Opel Manta 400	(Finland) Ari Vatanen						GRC; 4	ARG	FIN; Ret	ITA; Ret	CIV	GBR; Ret		6th	44	3rd	87
1983	Rothmans Opel Rally Team	Opel Ascona 400	(Finland) Henri Toivonen	MON; 6	SWE	POR	KEN	FRA								14th	16	3rd	87
1983	Rothmans Opel Rally Team	Opel Manta 400	(Finland) Henri Toivonen						GRC; Ret	ARG	FIN; Ret	ITA; 4	CIV	GBR; Ret		14th	16	3rd	87
1983	Rothmans Opel Rally Team	Opel Ascona 400	(France) Guy Fréquelin	MON; Ret	SWE	POR	KEN									-	0	3rd	87
1983	Rothmans Opel Rally Team	Opel Manta 400	(France) Guy Fréquelin					FRA; Ret	GRC	ARG	FIN	ITA	CIV	GBR		-	0	3rd	87
1983	Rothmans Opel Rally Team	Opel Ascona 400	(Finland) Rauno Aaltonen	MON	SWE	POR	KEN; Ret	FRA	GRC	ARG	FIN	ITA	CIV	GBR		-	0	3rd	87
1983	Rothmans Opel Rally Team	Opel Manta 400	(United Kingdom) Jimmy McRae	MON	SWE	POR	KEN	FRA	GRC; 8	ARG	FIN	ITA	CIV	GBR; 3		15th	15	3rd	87
1984	Opel Euro Team	Opel Manta 400	(Finland) Rauno Aaltonen	MON	SWE	POR	KEN; 2	FRA	GRC	NZL	ARG	FIN	ITA	CIV	GBR	15th	15	6th	48
1984	Opel Euro Team	Opel Manta 400	(France) Guy Fréquelin	MON	SWE	POR	KEN; Ret	FRA; 9	GRC	NZL	ARG	FIN	ITA	CIV	GBR	53rd	2	6th	48
1985	Opel Euro Team	Opel Manta 400	(Finland) Rauno Aaltonen	MON	SWE	POR	KEN; 4	FRA	GRC	NZL	ARG	FIN	ITA	CIV	GBR	22nd	10	8th	25
1985	Opel Euro Team	Opel Manta 400	(Germany) Erwin Weber	MON	SWE	POR	KEN; 5	FRA	GRC	NZL	ARG	FIN	ITA	CIV	GBR; 11	25th	8	8th	25
1985	Opel Euro Team	Opel Manta 400	(France) Guy Fréquelin	MON	SWE	POR	KEN	FRA; Ret	GRC	NZL	ARG	FIN	ITA	CIV	GBR	22nd	10	8th	25
1985	Opel Euro Team	Opel Manta 400	(United Kingdom) Jimmy McRae	MON	SWE	POR	KEN	FRA	GRC	NZL	ARG	FIN	ITA	CIV	GBR; 6	34th	6	8th	25
1985	Opel Euro Team	Opel Manta 400	(United Kingdom) Russell Brookes	MON	SWE	POR	KEN	FRA	GRC	NZL	ARG	FIN	ITA	CIV	GBR; 8	51st	1	8th	25
