= Hayden Paddon =

New Zealand rally driver (born 1987)

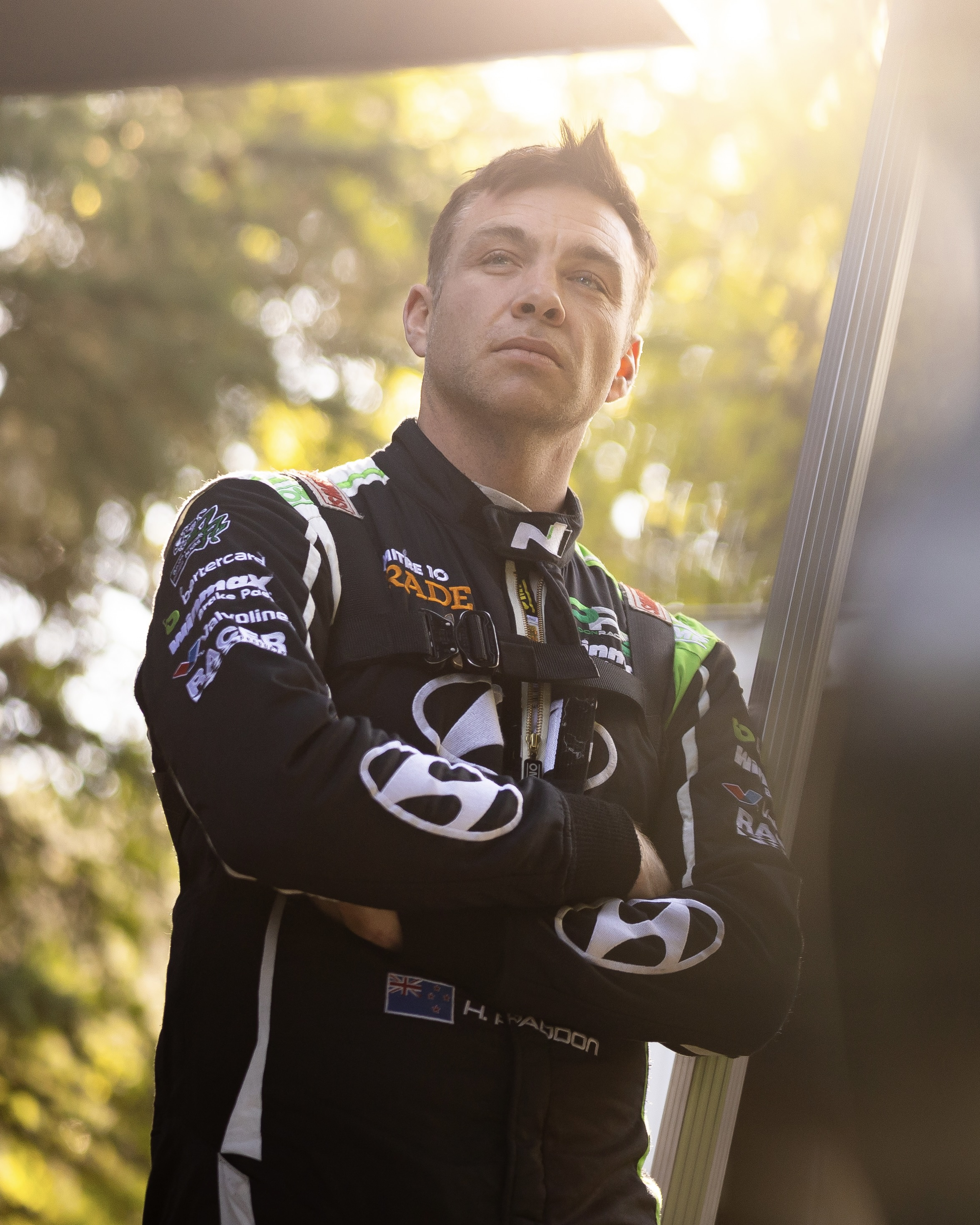
- Hayden Paddon at the 2024 Ashley Forest Rallysprint

Personal information
- Nationality: (New Zealand) New Zealander
- Full name: Hayden Christopher Paddon
- Born: 20 April 1987 (age 39); Geraldine, New Zealand

World Rally Championship record
- Years active: 2007–2019, 2022, 2026
- Co-driver: (New Zealand) John Kennard (United Kingdom) Sebastian Marshall
- Teams: Hyundai World Rally Team, M-Sport World Rally Team, Pirelli Star Driver
- Rallies: 84
- Championships: 0
- Rally wins: 1
- Podiums: 10
- Stage wins: 39
- Total points: 414
- First rally: 2007 Rally New Zealand
- First win: 2016 Rally Argentina
- Last win: 2016 Rally Argentina
- Last rally: 2026 Rally del Paraguay

Hayden Christopher Paddon (born 20 April 1987) is a New Zealand rally driver. He was PWRC world champion in 2011 and won the New Zealand Rally Championship in 2008, 2009, 2013, 2018, 2021, 2022 and 2023. In 2023, he became the first non-European to be crowned European Rally Champion. He followed that up by retaining the European Rally Championship title in 2024 and winning the FIA Asia-Pacific Rally Championship.

== Career ==
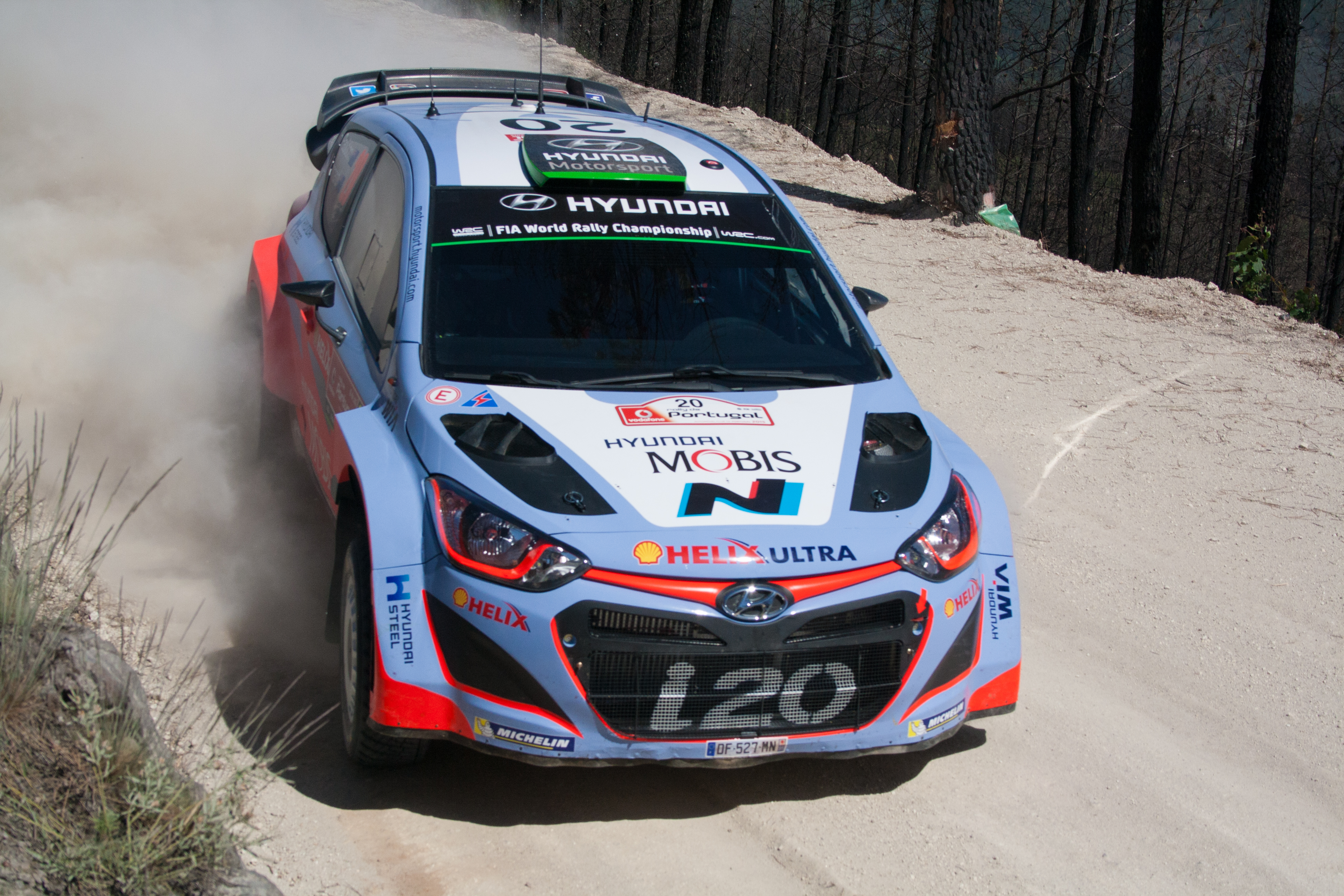
Paddon driving at the 2015 Rally de Portugal.

Paddon was introduced into motorsport at an early age, his father Chris being a rally driver, beginning his career competing in karting. He competed in his first rally in 2002, at the age of 15. In 2005, he rolled and burnt his car in Rally Canterbury 2005. In 2006, he began competing in the New Zealand Rally Championship in a Mitsubishi Lancer Evolution VIII, winning both the Junior and Rookie titles. In 2007, he made his World Rally Championship debut competing in the Production World Rally Championship category at his home event in New Zealand as a wildcard entry, and then in the Team Jordan entry for Rally GB. In the New Zealand championship he retained his Junior title and came within a point of winning the championship outright. In 2008, he competed in a new Mitsubishi Evo IX, winning the New Zealand title. He also finished 13th overall and fourth in PWRC on his home round of the WRC.

In 2009, Paddon retained his New Zealand title, won the Pacific Cup, and also qualified for the Pirelli Star Driver Asia-Pacific final at the 2009 Rally Australia. Paddon was the fastest of the drivers on the opening day's stages, meaning he won the Pirelli Star Driver scholarship, giving him a fully funded programme for six events of the 2010 World Rally Championship season. Paddon's event got even better when he finished ninth overall, ahead of all of the PWRC regulars. Paddon also won a $50,000 International Rising Stars Scholarship run by Rally of New Zealand, giving him the additional funding needed to complete a full 2010 PWRC campaign in addition to the PSD events.

In 2010, Paddon won the PWRC category of Rally New Zealand in his own Evo IX, finishing 14th overall. He then finished third and second in PWRC on Rally Finland and Rallye Deutschland in the Pirelli Star Driver Evo X.

In 2011, Paddon contested a full PWRC season, consisting of six rounds; Portugal, Argentina, Finland, Australia, Spain and GB. He competed under his newly formed team New Zealand World Rally Team and in a surprising move, Paddon switched to a Subaru for the 2011 season, as he had usually run in a Mitsubishi. Paddon drove a STR11 Subaru Impreza N4 run by Belgian Team Symtech Racing. Paddon's 2011 season proved to be a breakthrough as he took 1st place in four rallies consecutively: Portugal, Argentina, Finland and Australia, where he became 2011 P-WRC Champion.

The 2012 season saw Paddon move to the S-WRC championship in a Škoda Fabia S2000. After a 4th place among the S-WRC finishers in Sweden, he took his first S-WRC win in his second rally in the car at 2012 Rally de Portugal, which saw many competitors, including Paddon, have breakdowns.

2014 saw Paddon's first stage win in the World Rally Championship during the Rally Catalunya in Spain.

In 2015, Paddon took his first ever lead of a WRC event in the Rally d'Italia. Paddon was the first New Zealander to lead a World Rally Championship event since Possum Bourne held the lead in the 1999 Rally New Zealand and the first one to do so outside of his country. He finished second overall, behind Sébastien Ogier, after a careful performance and many stage wins.

In 2016, on the fourth round, the YPF Rally Argentina, Paddon took his - and New Zealand's - first WRC win by 13.3 seconds from Sébastien Ogier. His co-driver, John Kennard also became the oldest co-driver to win a WRC round at 57 years of age. Notably and perhaps controversially he celebrated the victory with a black and silver fern flag rather than the flag of New Zealand, following the failed flag referendum held earlier in the year. His intent was to distinguish the New Zealand flag from the Australian flag, where confusions still exists, even when, at the time of the victory, he was not competing against Australian drivers or co-drivers.

In the first rally of 2017, the 2017 Monte Carlo Rally, Paddon crashed out on the first stage, losing control of his Hyundai. A spectator was killed in the incident having been hit by the right rear of Paddon's car. Although Paddon's car was not severely damaged and could have continued, the Hyundai team withdrew Paddon from the rally as a mark of respect. Prior to round 6 in Portugal, Paddon's long-time co-driver John Kennard decided to retire through injury, and he was replaced by Briton Sebastian Marshall. Overall, Paddon endured a frustrating season, picking up just two podiums in Poland and Australia. He led round 7 in Italy, until retiring late on day 2 after hitting a bank and breaking his right rear suspension.

In October 2020, Hayden Paddon and Hyundai New Zealand reveals one of the worlds first EV rally cars, based on the Hyundai Kona. Paddon both organised and won the 2020 inaugural Ben Nevis Station Golden 1200 hillclimbing event in Central Otago, where he was driving a specially prepared Hyundai i20 called the AP4++ with a custom 2.1L turbo 4 cylinder engine making 800 hp.

In March 2022, Paddon teamed up with Hyundai New Zealand to enter a car into WRC2. The car will be run by Hyundai New Zealand Rally, with the previously established team of engineers, technician and team management. Hayden managed to fight off many international drivers to win the WRC2 class in his home country. In 2023, Paddon joined the Italian BRC Racing Team, and with the support of Hyundai New Zealand and Pirelli Tyres, put a 2023 European Rally Championship together. Winning the first event of the season in Portugal, Hayden and John Kennard fought their way to a maiden European Rally Championship Title, becoming the first non-European driver to win said championship. Paddon also fought on his home grounds to win the 2023 New Zealand Rally Championship.

2024 saw Paddon and John Kennard put together another European Rally Championship title fight in the BRC Racing Team with the support of Hyundai New Zealand, Pirelli Tyres, and HMS Customer Racing. Hayden and John had a tough fight throughout the season, taking their first and only win of the season at round 7 in Rali Ceredigion. Fighting off title fights from Mathieu Franceschi and Mikolaj Marczyk, Hayden managed to win back-to-back European Rally Championships. Paddon also managed to win the 2024 FIA Asia-Pacific Rally Championship with up and coming New Zealand co-driver Jared Hudson.

In 2026, with co-driver John Kennard, Hayden stepped back into the Hyundai World Rally Team as their third driver for select rounds of the 2026 World Rally Championship, sharing the 3rd Hyundai with drivers Esapekka Lappi and Dani Sordo. He competed four rounds of the 2026 championship, three tarmac rallies, and one gravel rally. Hayden went on to pick up two podiums in the 2026 season. A third place at Rally Croatia, and a second place at the Rally del Paraguay.

== WRC victories ==
#	Event	Season	Co-driver	Car
1	36° Rally Argentina	2016	(New Zealand) John Kennard	Hyundai i20 WRC

== ERC victories ==
#	Event	Season	Co-Driver	Car
1	(Portugal) Rally Serras de Fafe e Felgueiras	2023	(New Zealand) John Kennard	Hyundai i20 N Rally2
2	(United Kingdom) Rali Ceredigion	2024	(New Zealand) John Kennard	Hyundai i20 N Rally2

== Results ==
=== WRC results ===
Year	Entrant	Car	1	2	3	4	5	6	7	8	9	10	11	12	13	14	15	16	WDC	Points
2007	Paddon Direct Green Team	Mitsubishi Lancer Evolution VIII	MON	SWE	NOR	MEX	POR	ARG	ITA	GRE	FIN	GER	NZL; 49						NC	0
2007	Team Jordan	Mitsubishi Lancer Evolution IX												ESP	FRA	JPN	IRE	GBR; Ret	NC	0
2008	Paddon Direct Green Team	Mitsubishi Lancer Evolution IX	MON	SWE	MEX	ARG	JOR	ITA	GRE	TUR	FIN	GER	NZL; 12	ESP	FRA	JPN	GBR		NC	0
2009	Hayden Paddon	Mitsubishi Lancer Evolution IX	IRE	NOR	CYP	POR	ARG	ITA	GRE	POL	FIN	AUS; 9	ESP	GBR					NC	0
2010	Pirelli Star Driver	Mitsubishi Lancer Evolution X	SWE	MEX	JOR	TUR; 26		POR; 20	BUL	FIN; 21	GER; 19		FRA; 35	ESP	GBR; 19				NC	0
2010	Hayden Paddon	Mitsubishi Lancer Evolution IX					NZL; 14					JPN; 12							NC	0
2011	New Zealand World Rally Team	Subaru Impreza WRX STi	SWE	MEX	POR; 11	JOR	ITA	ARG; 9	GRE	FIN; 19	GER	AUS; 6	FRA	ESP; 34					18th	10
2011	Hayden Paddon	Subaru Impreza STi R4													GBR; 13				18th	10
2012	Hayden Paddon	Škoda Fabia S2000	MON	SWE; 23	MEX	POR; 16	ARG	GRE	NZL; 12	FIN; Ret	GER	GBR; 26	FRA; Ret	ITA	ESP; 20				NC	0
2013	Hayden Paddon	Škoda Fabia S2000	MON	SWE	MEX	POR	ARG	GRE	ITA	FIN; 11	GER; 8	AUS; 17	FRA		GBR				18th	8
2013	Qatar M-Sport World Rally Team	Ford Fiesta RS WRC												ESP; 8					18th	8
2014	Hyundai Motorsport N	Hyundai i20 WRC	MON	SWE	MEX	POR	ARG	ITA; 12	POL; 8	FIN; 8	GER	AUS; 6	FRA	ESP; 9	GBR; 10				14th	19
2015	Hyundai Motorsport	Hyundai i20 WRC	MON	SWE; 5								AUS; 5			GBR; 5				9th	84
2015	Hyundai Motorsport N	Hyundai i20 WRC			MEX; 17	ARG; 16	POR; 8	ITA; 2	POL; 4	FIN; Ret	GER; 9		FRA; 5	ESP; 6					9th	84
2016	Hyundai Motorsport N	Hyundai i20 WRC	MON; 25		MEX; 5	ARG; 1					GER; 5	CHN; C	FRA; 6	ESP; 4	GBR; 4				4th	138
2016	Hyundai Motorsport	Hyundai i20 WRC		SWE; 2			POR; Ret	ITA; Ret	POL; 3	FIN; 5						AUS; 4			4th	138
2017	Hyundai Motorsport	Hyundai i20 Coupe WRC	MON; Ret	SWE; 7	MEX; 5	FRA; 6	ARG; 6	POR; Ret	ITA; Ret	POL; 2	FIN; Ret	GER; 8	ESP	GBR; 8	AUS; 3				8th	74
2018	Hyundai Shell Mobis WRT	Hyundai i20 Coupe WRC	MON	SWE; 5	MEX	FRA	ARG	POR; Ret	ITA; 4	FIN; 4	GER	TUR; 3	GBR; 7	ESP	AUS; 2				8th	73
2019	M-Sport Ford WRT	Ford Fiesta WRC	MON	SWE	MEX	FRA	ARG	CHL	POR	ITA	FIN; WD	GER	TUR		ESP	AUS; C			NC	0
2019	M-Sport Ford WRT	Ford Fiesta R5 Mk. II												GBR; 38					NC	0
2022	Hayden Paddon	Hyundai i20 N Rally2	MON	SWE	CRO	POR	ITA	KEN	EST; Ret	FIN; 11	BEL	GRE	NZL; 6	ESP	JPN				21st	8
2026	Hyundai Shell Mobis WRT	Hyundai i20 N Rally1	MON; 11	SWE	KEN	CRO; 3	ESP	POR	JPN; 7	GRE	EST	FIN	PAR; 2	CHL	ITA	SAU			8th	38

=== PWRC results ===
Year	Entrant	Car	1	2	3	4	5	6	7	8	9	PWRC	Points
2007	Paddon Direct Team Green	Mitsubishi Lancer Evo VII	MON	SWE	ARG	GRE	NZL; 17	JPN	IRE			NC	0
2007	Team Jordan	Mitsubishi Lancer Evo IX								GBR; Ret		NC	0
2008	Paddon Direct Team Green	Mitsubishi Lancer Evo IX	SWE	ARG	GRE	TUR	FIN	NZL; 4	JPN	GBR		21st	5
2010	Pirelli Star Driver	Mitsubishi Lancer Evo IX	SWE	MEX	JOR	NZL; 1			JPN; 2			3rd	97
2010	Pirelli Star Driver	Mitsubishi Lancer Evo X					FIN; 3	GER; 2		FRA; 7	GBR; 3	3rd	97
2011	Hayden Paddon	Subaru Impreza WRX STi	SWE	POR; 1	ARG; 1	FIN; 1	AUS; 1	ESP; 8	GBR			1st	104

=== SWRC results ===
Year	Entrant	Car	1	2	3	4	5	6	7	8	SWRC	Points
2012	Hayden Paddon	Škoda Fabia S2000	MON	SWE; 4	POR; 1	NZL; 1	FIN; Ret	GBR; 7	FRA; Ret	ESP; 5	4th	78

=== WRC-2 results ===
Year	Entrant	Car	1	2	3	4	5	6	7	8	9	10	11	12	13	Pos.	Points
2013	Hayden Paddon	Škoda Fabia S2000	MON	SWE	MEX	POR	ARG	GRE	ITA	FIN; 3	GER; 3	AUS; 5	FRA	ESP	GBR	13th	40
2022	Hayden Paddon	Hyundai i20 N Rally2	MON	SWE	CRO	POR	ITA	KEN	EST; Ret	FIN; 3	BEL	GRE	NZL; 1	ESP	JPN	10th	43

=== WRC-2 Pro results ===
Year	Entrant	Car	1	2	3	4	5	6	7	8	9	10	11	12	13	14	WDC	Points
2019	M-Sport Ford WRT	Ford Fiesta R5 Mk. II	MON	SWE	MEX	FRA	ARG	CHL	POR	ITA	FIN	GER	TUR	GBR; 4	ESP	AUS	8th	12

=== European Rally Championship results ===
Year	Entrant	Car	1	2	3	4	5	6	7	8	9	10	11	12	Pos.	Points
2013	Symtech Racing	Ford Fiesta S2000	JÄN	LIE	CAN	AZO	COR	YPR; Ret	ROM	ZLÍ	POL	CRO	SAN	VAL	62nd	5
2022	Paddon Rallysport	Hyundai i20 N Rally2	AZO1	AZO2	CAN	POL	LAT; 6	ITA	CZE	ESP					33rd	15
2023	BRC Racing Team	Hyundai i20 N Rally2	PRT; 1	CAN; 2	POL; 2	LAT; 2	SWE; 2	ITA; 3	CZE; Ret	HUN					1st	163
2024	BRC Racing Team	Hyundai i20 N Rally2	HUN; 4	CAN; 6	SWE; 3	EST; 5	ITA; 6	CZE; 12	GBR; 1	POL; 3					1st	145
