= John Kennard (co-driver) =

New Zealand rally co-driver (born 1959)

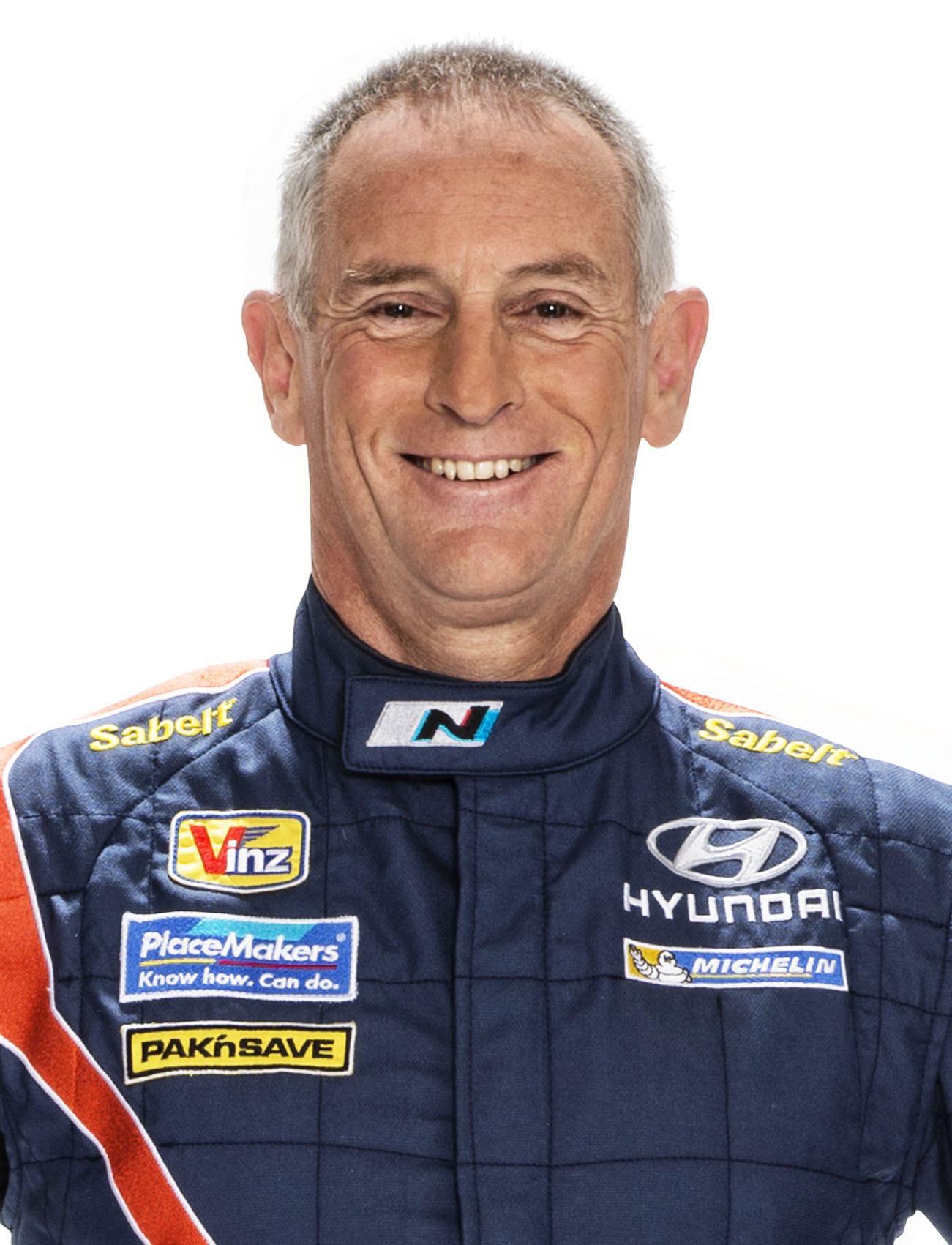

Personal information
- Nationality: (New Zealand) New Zealander
- Full name: John Robert Kennard
- Born: 11 February 1959 (age 67); Christchurch, New Zealand

World Rally Championship record
- Years active: 1985, 1987–1989, 1991, 1998, 2007–2017, 2019, 2022, 2026
- Driver: (New Zealand) Brent Rawstron (New Zealand) Stuart Weeber (New Zealand) Malcolm Stewart (New Zealand) Simon Davies (United Kingdom) Chris Birkbeck (New Zealand) Greg Taylor (Finland) Juha Kangas (New Zealand) Hayden Paddon
- Teams: Pirelli Star Driver, Hyundai Motorsport, M-Sport
- Rallies: 79
- Championships: 0
- Rally wins: 1
- Podiums: 7
- Stage wins: 23
- First rally: 1985 1000 Lakes Rally
- First win: 2016 Rally Argentina
- Last win: 2016 Rally Argentina
- Last rally: 2026 Rally del Paraguay

John Robert Kennard (born 11 February 1959) is a rally co-driver born in Christchurch, New Zealand.

== Rally career ==
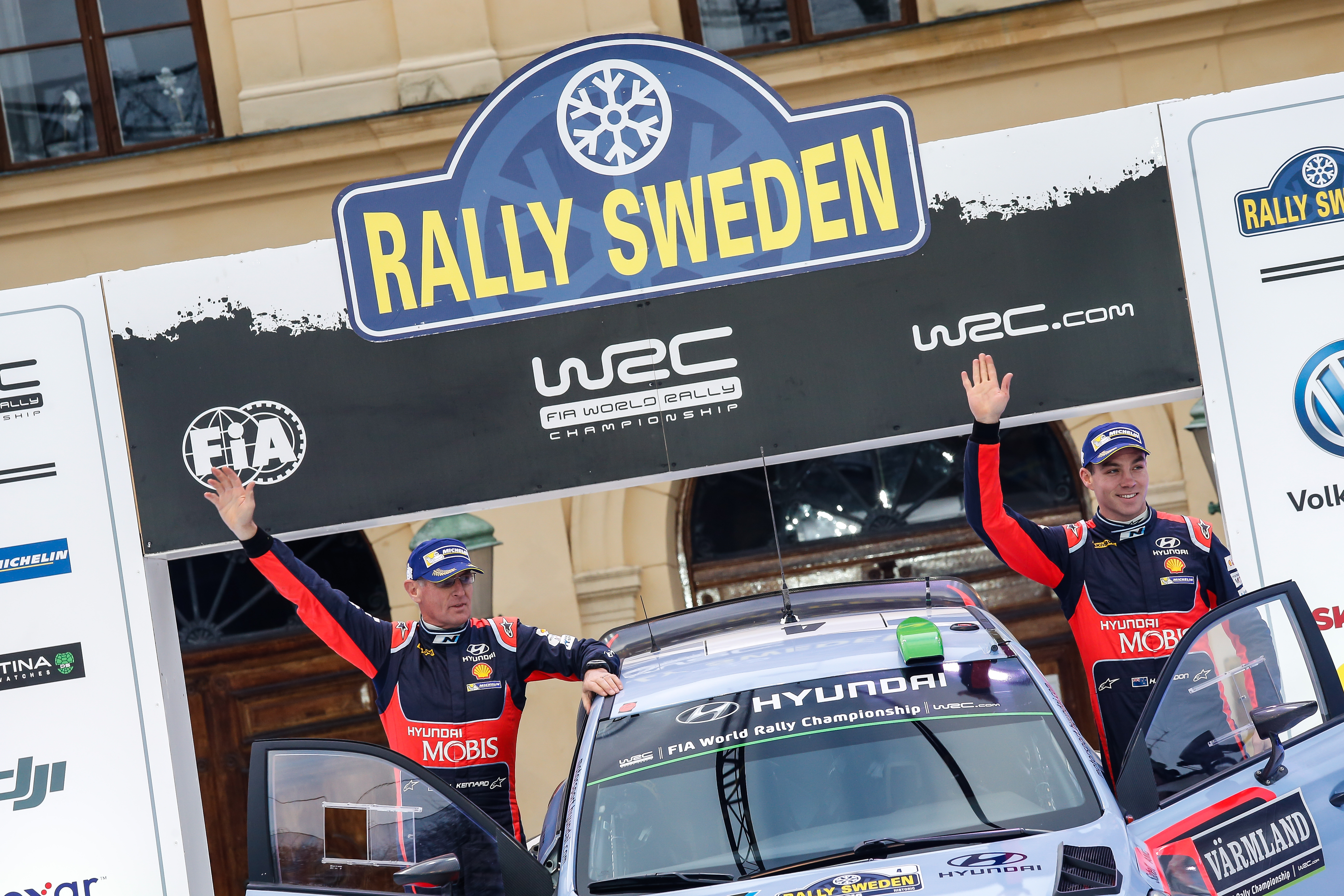
John Kennard (left) and Hayden Paddon (right) at 2016 Rally Sweden.

Kennard's first taste of the WRC came at the 1985 1000 Lakes Rally where he co-drove in a Toyota Starlet for Brent Rawstron. Kennard is a well-known co-driver to numerous drivers, the most notable being Hayden Paddon at Hyundai motorsport. The pairing had their first win at Rally Argentina in 2016, bring New Zealand to the top step of the WRC podium.

In March 2017, it was announced that Kennard would step down as Paddon's co-driver after Rally Finland and that a replacement for Kennard would be announced soon. The replacement was confirmed the day after to be Kevin Abbring's co-driver Sebastian Marshall. Kennard suffered a hip injury prior to the 2017 Rally de Portugal, which meant Marshall had to substitute for Kennard for the rally. On 30 May, Kennard retired as co-driver earlier than what was planned, because of the injury.

Kennard was voted Marlborough Sportsperson of the Year in 2016, succeeding Sophie MacKenzie.

2023 saw Kennard compete with Hayden Paddon in the 2023 European Rally Championship. The pair came out on top claiming their first European Rally Championship Title, and becoming the first non-european team to win the championship. Kennard and Paddon also fought off local competition to win his 6th New Zealand Rally Championship Co-Drivers Title.

In 2024, Kennard stepped down from his NZRC co-driving duties, allowing up and coming co-driver Jared Hudson to sit with driver Hayden Paddon in New Zealand, with Hudson sitting with Paddon, and claiming a back-to-back European Rally Championship Title.

In 2026, Kennard competed with long-time driver Hayden Paddon in select rounds of the 2026 World Rally Championship. They competed four rounds of the 2026 championship, three tarmac rallies, and one gravel rally. Hayden went on to pick up two podiums in the 2026 season, a third place at Rally Croatia, and a second place at the Rally del Paraguay..

== Personal life ==
Kennard lives between his homes in Marlborough, NZ and Finland with his wife Satu Lappalainen. They own and run New Zealand vineyard Vicarage Lane producing Sauvignon Blanc, Riesling, Sauvignon, and Pinot Noir wines.

== Rally victories ==
=== WRC victories ===
#	Event	Season	Driver	Car
1	36° Rally Argentina	2016	(New Zealand) Hayden Paddon	Hyundai i20 WRC

=== ERC victories ===
#	Event	Season	Driver	Car
1	(Portugal) Rally Serras de Fafe e Felgueiras	2023	(New Zealand) Hayden Paddon	Hyundai i20 Rally2
2	(United Kingdom) Rali Ceredigion	2024	(New Zealand) Hayden Paddon	Hyundai i20 Rally2

=== NZRC victories ===
#	Event	Season	Driver	Car
1	(New Zealand) Hella International Rally of Whangarei	2007	(New Zealand) Hayden Paddon	Mitsubishi Lancer Evo VIII
2	(New Zealand) Rally Nelson	2007	(New Zealand) Hayden Paddon	Mitsubishi Lancer Evo VIII
3	(New Zealand) Rally Hawkes Bay	2008	(New Zealand) Hayden Paddon	Mitsubishi Lancer Evo IX
4	(New Zealand) South Canterbury Spring Rally	2008	(New Zealand) Hayden Paddon	Mitsubishi Lancer Evo IX
5	(New Zealand) International Rally of Otago	2009	(New Zealand) Hayden Paddon	Mitsubishi Lancer Evo IX
6	(New Zealand) NAC Insurance International Rally of Whangarei	2009	(New Zealand) Hayden Paddon	Mitsubishi Lancer Evo IX
7	(New Zealand) Trust House/Racetech Rally Wairarapa	2009	(New Zealand) Hayden Paddon	Mitsubishi Lancer Evo IX
8	(New Zealand) Rally Nelson	2009	(New Zealand) Hayden Paddon	Mitsubishi Lancer Evo VIII
9	(New Zealand) International Rally of Whangarei	2010	(New Zealand) Hayden Paddon	Mitsubishi Lancer Evo IX
10	(New Zealand) DriveSouth International Rally of Otago	2011	(New Zealand) Hayden Paddon	Subaru Impreza STi N14
11	Rally New Zealand	2011	(New Zealand) Hayden Paddon	Subaru Impreza STi N14
12	(New Zealand) International Rally of Otago	2013	(New Zealand) Hayden Paddon	Mitsubishi Lancer Evo IX
13	(New Zealand) International Rally of Whangarei	2013	(New Zealand) Hayden Paddon	Mitsubishi Lancer Evo IX
14	(New Zealand) Trust House/Racetech Rally Wairarapa	2013	(New Zealand) Hayden Paddon	Mitsubishi Lancer Evo IX
15	(New Zealand) International Rally of Otago	2015	(New Zealand) Hayden Paddon	Ford Escort RS 1800 MKII
16	(New Zealand) DriveSouth International Rally of Otago	2016	(New Zealand) Hayden Paddon	Hyundai i20 AP4
17	Rally New Zealand	2017	(New Zealand) Hayden Paddon	Hyundai i20 AP4
18	(New Zealand) International Rally of Otago	2018	(New Zealand) Hayden Paddon	Hyundai i20 AP4
19	(New Zealand) Rally of South Canterbury	2018	(New Zealand) Hayden Paddon	Hyundai i20 AP4
20	(New Zealand) International Rally of Otago	2019	(New Zealand) Hayden Paddon	Hyundai i20 AP4
21	(New Zealand) City of Auckland Rally	2020	(New Zealand) Hayden Paddon	Hyundai i20 AP4
22	(New Zealand) International Rally of Otago	2021	(New Zealand) Hayden Paddon	Hyundai i20 AP4
23	(New Zealand) International Rally of Whangarei	2021	(New Zealand) Hayden Paddon	Hyundai i20 AP4
24	(New Zealand) Rally of South Canterbury	2021	(New Zealand) Hayden Paddon	Hyundai i20 AP4
25	(New Zealand) Rally Hawkes Bay	2021	(New Zealand) Hayden Paddon	Hyundai i20 AP4
26	(New Zealand) International Rally of Otago	2022	(New Zealand) Hayden Paddon	Hyundai i20 AP4
27	(New Zealand) International Rally of Whangarei	2022	(New Zealand) Hayden Paddon	Hyundai i20 AP4
28	Repco Rally New Zealand	2022	(New Zealand) Hayden Paddon	Hyundai i20 N Rally2
29	(New Zealand) International Rally of Otago	2023	(New Zealand) Hayden Paddon	Hyundai i20 N Rally2
30	(New Zealand) International Rally of Whangarei	2023	(New Zealand) Hayden Paddon	Hyundai i20 N Rally2
31	(New Zealand) Daybreaker Rally Manawatu	2023	(New Zealand) Hayden Paddon	Hyundai i20 N Rally2
32	(New Zealand) Rally Bay of Plenty	2023	(New Zealand) Hayden Paddon	Hyundai i20 AP4

== Rally results ==
=== WRC results ===
Year	Entrant	Car	1	2	3	4	5	6	7	8	9	10	11	12	13	14	15	16	WDC	Points
1985	Brent Rawstron	Toyota Starlet	MON	SWE	POR	KEN	FRA	GRC	NZL	ARG	FIN; 44	ITA	CIV	GBR; Ret					NC	0
1987	Stuart Weeber	Toyota Starlet	MON	SWE	POR	KEN	FRA	GRE	USA	NZL; 7	ARG	FIN	CIV	ITA	GBR				46th	4
1988	Malcolm Stewart	Audi Coupé Quattro	MON	SWE	POR	KEN	FRA	GRE	USA	NZL; 3	ARG	FIN	CIV	ITA	GBR				20th	12
1989	Simon Davies	Subaru Leone	SWE	MON	POR	KEN	FRA	GRE	NZL; Ret	ARG									NC	0
1989	Chris Birkbeck	Peugeot 205 GTI									FIN; Ret	AUS	ITA	CIV	GBR				NC	0
1991	Greg Taylor	Mazda 323	MON	SWE	POR	KEN	FRA	GRE	NZL; Ret	ARG	FIN	AUS	ITA	CIV	ESP	GBR			NC	0
1998	Juha Kangas	Subaru Impreza WRX	MON	SWE	KEN	POR	ESP	FRA	ARG	GRE	NZL	FIN	ITA	AUS	GBR; 24				NC	0
2007	Paddon Direct Green Team	Mitsubishi Lancer Evolution VIII	MON	SWE	NOR	MEX	POR	ARG	ITA	GRE	FIN	GER	NZL; 49						NC	0
2007	Team Jordan	Mitsubishi Lancer Evolution IX												ESP	FRA	JPN	IRE	GBR; Ret	NC	0
2008	Paddon Direct Green Team	Mitsubishi Lancer Evolution IX	MON	SWE	MEX	ARG	JOR	ITA	GRE	TUR	FIN	GER	NZL; 12	ESP	FRA	JPN	GBR		NC	0
2009	Hayden Paddon	Mitsubishi Lancer Evolution IX	IRE	NOR	CYP	POR	ARG	ITA	GRE	POL	FIN	AUS; 9	ESP	GBR					NC	0
2010	Pirelli Star Driver	Mitsubishi Lancer Evolution X	SWE	MEX	JOR	TUR; 26		POR; 20	BUL	FIN; 21	GER; 19		FRA; 35	ESP	GBR; 19				NC	0
2010	Hayden Paddon	Mitsubishi Lancer Evolution IX					NZL; 14					JPN; 12							NC	0
2011	New Zealand World Rally Team	Subaru Impreza WRX STi	SWE	MEX	POR; 11	JOR	ITA	ARG; 9	GRE	FIN; 19	GER	AUS; 6	FRA	ESP; 34					18th	10
2011	Hayden Paddon	Subaru Impreza STi R4													GBR; 13				18th	10
2012	Hayden Paddon	Škoda Fabia S2000	MON	SWE; 23	MEX	POR; 16	ARG	GRE	NZL; 12	FIN; Ret	GER	GBR; 26	FRA; Ret	ITA	ESP; 20				NC	0
2013	Hayden Paddon	Škoda Fabia S2000	MON	SWE	MEX	POR	ARG	GRE	ITA	FIN; 11	GER; 8	AUS; 17	FRA		GBR				18th	8
2013	Qatar M-Sport World Rally Team	Ford Fiesta RS WRC												ESP; 8					18th	8
2014	Hyundai Motorsport N	Hyundai i20 WRC	MON	SWE	MEX	POR	ARG	ITA; 12	POL; 8	FIN; 8	GER	AUS; 6	FRA	ESP; 9	GBR; 10				15th	19
2015	Hyundai Motorsport	Hyundai i20 WRC	MON	SWE; 5								AUS; 5			GBR; 5				9th	84
2015	Hyundai Motorsport N	Hyundai i20 WRC			MEX; 17	ARG; 16	POR; 8	ITA; 2	POL; 4	FIN; Ret	GER; 9		FRA; 5	ESP; 6					9th	84
2016	Hyundai Motorsport N	Hyundai i20 WRC	MON; 25		MEX; 5	ARG; 1					GER; 5	CHN; C	FRA; 6	ESP; 4	GBR; 4				4th	138
2016	Hyundai Motorsport	Hyundai i20 WRC		SWE; 2			POR; Ret	ITA; Ret	POL; 3	FIN; 5						AUS; 4			4th	138
2017	Hyundai Motorsport	Hyundai i20 Coupe WRC	MON; WD	SWE; 7	MEX; 5	FRA; 6	ARG; 6	POR	ITA	POL	FIN	GER	ESP	GBR	AUS				13th	33
2019	M-Sport Ford WRT	Ford Fiesta WRC	MON	SWE	MEX	FRA	ARG	CHL	POR	ITA	FIN; WD	GER	TUR		ESP	AUS; C			NC	0
2019	M-Sport Ford WRT	Ford Fiesta R5 Mk. II												GBR; 38					NC	0
2022	Hayden Paddon	Hyundai i20 N Rally2	MON	SWE	CRO	POR	ITA	KEN	EST; Ret	FIN; 11	BEL	GRE	NZL; 6	ESP	JPN				21st	8
2026	Hyundai Shell Mobis WRT	Hyundai i20 N Rally1	MON; 11	SWE	KEN	CRO; 3	ESP	POR	JPN; 7	GRE	EST	FIN	PAR; 3	CHL	ITA	SAU			11th*	15*

=== ERC results ===
Year	Entrant	Car	1	2	3	4	5	6	7	8	9	10	11	12	Pos.	Points
2013	Symtech Racing	Ford Fiesta S2000	JÄN	LIE	CAN	AZO	COR	YPR Ret	ROM	ZLÍ	POL	CRO	SAN	VAL	62nd	5
2022	Paddon Rallysport	Hyundai i20 N Rally2	AZO1	AZO2	CAN	POL	LAT 6	ITA	CZE	ESP					29th	15
2023	BRC Racing Team	Hyundai i20 N Rally2	PRT 1	CAN 2	POL 2	LAT 2	SWE 2	ITA 3	CZE Ret	HUN					1st	163
2024	BRC Racing Team	Hyundai i20 N Rally2	HUN 4	CAN 6	SWE 3	EST 5	ITA 6	CZE 12	GBR 1	POL 3					1st	145
