= Renault Clio Rally4 =

Renault Rally4 rally car

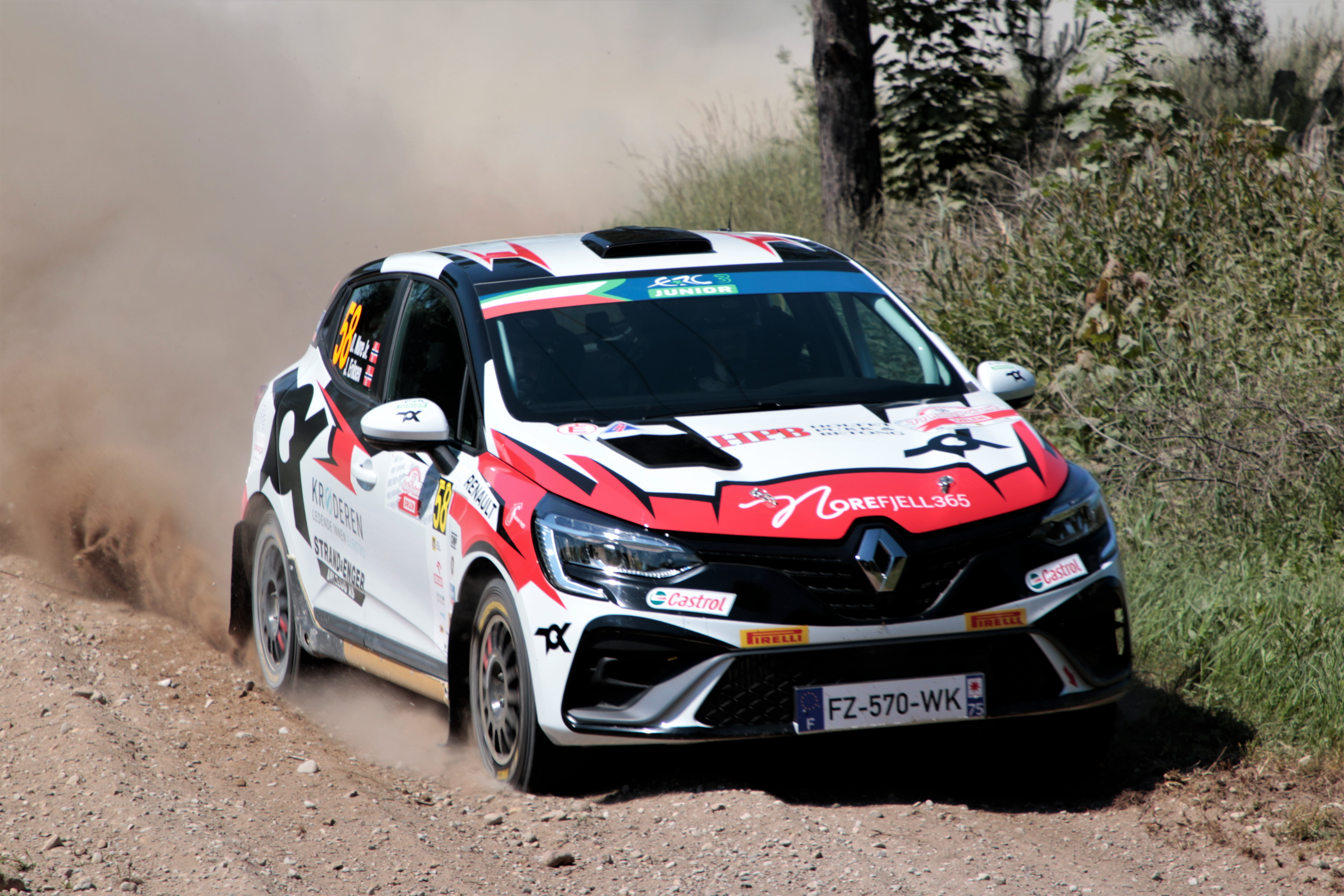
- A Clio Rally4 at the 2021 Rally Poland
- Category: Rally4
- Constructor: Renault Sport
- Designer: Vincent Gaillardot

Technical specifications
- Length: 4,050 in (10,287.0 cm)
- Width: 1,988 in (5,049.5 cm)
- Height: 1,450 in (3,683.0 cm)
- Axle track: 1,500 in (3,810.0 cm)
- Wheelbase: 2,579 in (6,550.7 cm)
- Engine: Renault TCe 1.3 L (79 cu in) I4, 16-valve turbocharged front-engine, front-wheel-drive
- Transmission: Sadev 5-speed sequential 2-wheel drive
- Weight: 1,080 kg (2,381.0 lb)

Competition history
- Debut: 2021

The Renault Clio Rally4 is a rally car developed and built by Renault Sport for the Rally Pyramid regulation of the Rally4 category. It is based upon the Renault Clio road car and used by the crews competing the European Rally Championship-3.

== Development ==
The Renault Clio Rally4 weighs 1,080 kilograms (2,380 lb) and features a five-speed sequential gearbox and a turbocharged 1,330-cubic-centimetre (81 cu in) four-cylinder engine, which is more powerful than that in the Rally5 variant. It features adjustable shock absorbers, using slightly wider tyres at tarmac events than the Rally5 car. The Rally4 car is largely based upon the Rally5 version in most aspects, which itself is derived from the standard road-going R.S. Line model of the mark five Clio.

== Competition history ==
The car made its debut at the Targa Florio – Rally Internazionale di Sicilia, driven by Paolo Andreucci.

== Rally victories ==
=== European Rally Championship-3 ===
Year	No.	Event	Surface	Driver	Co-driver
2021	1	(Latvia) 2021 Rally Liepāja	Gravel	(France) Jean-Baptiste Franceschi	(France) Anthony Gorguilo
2021	2	(Portugal) 2021 Azores Rallye	Gravel	(France) Jean-Baptiste Franceschi	(France) Anthony Gorguilo
2021	3	(Spain) 2021 Rally Islas Canarias	Tarmac	(France) Anthony Fotia	(France) Arnaud Dunand

=== European Rally Championship-4 ===
Year	No.	Event	Surface	Driver	Co-driver
2022	1	(Portugal) 2022 Azores Rallye	Gravel	(France) Anthony Fotia	(France) Arnaud Dunand
2023	2	2023 Rally Poland	Gravel	(Norway) Ola Nore	(Norway) Rune Eilertsen
2023	3	(Latvia) 2023 Rally Liepāja	Gravel	(Norway) Ola Nore	(Norway) Torstein Eriksen

=== Junior European Rally Championship ===
Year	No.	Event	Surface	Driver	Co-driver
2021 (Note: The championship was referred to as ERC3 Junior.)	1	(Latvia) 2021 Rally Liepāja	Gravel	(France) Jean-Baptiste Franceschi	(France) Anthony Gorguilo
2021	2	(Italy) 2021 Rally di Roma Capitale	Tarmac	(France) Jean-Baptiste Franceschi	(France) Anthony Gorguilo
2021	3	(Czech Republic) 2021 Barum Czech Rally Zlín	Tarmac	(France) Jean-Baptiste Franceschi	(France) Anthony Gorguilo
2021	4	(Spain) 2021 Rally Islas Canarias	Tarmac	(France) Anthony Fotia	(France) Arnaud Dunand
2023	5	2023 Rally Poland	Gravel	(Norway) Ola Nore	(Norway) Rune Eilertsen
2023	6	(Latvia) 2023 Rally Liepāja	Gravel	(Norway) Ola Nore	(Norway) Torstein Eriksen
