= 2023 European Rally Championship =

The 2023 European Rally Championship was the 71st season of the FIA European Rally Championship, the European continental championship series in rallying. The season was also the tenth following the merge between the European Rally Championship and the Intercontinental Rally Challenge. Hayden Paddon became the drivers champion.

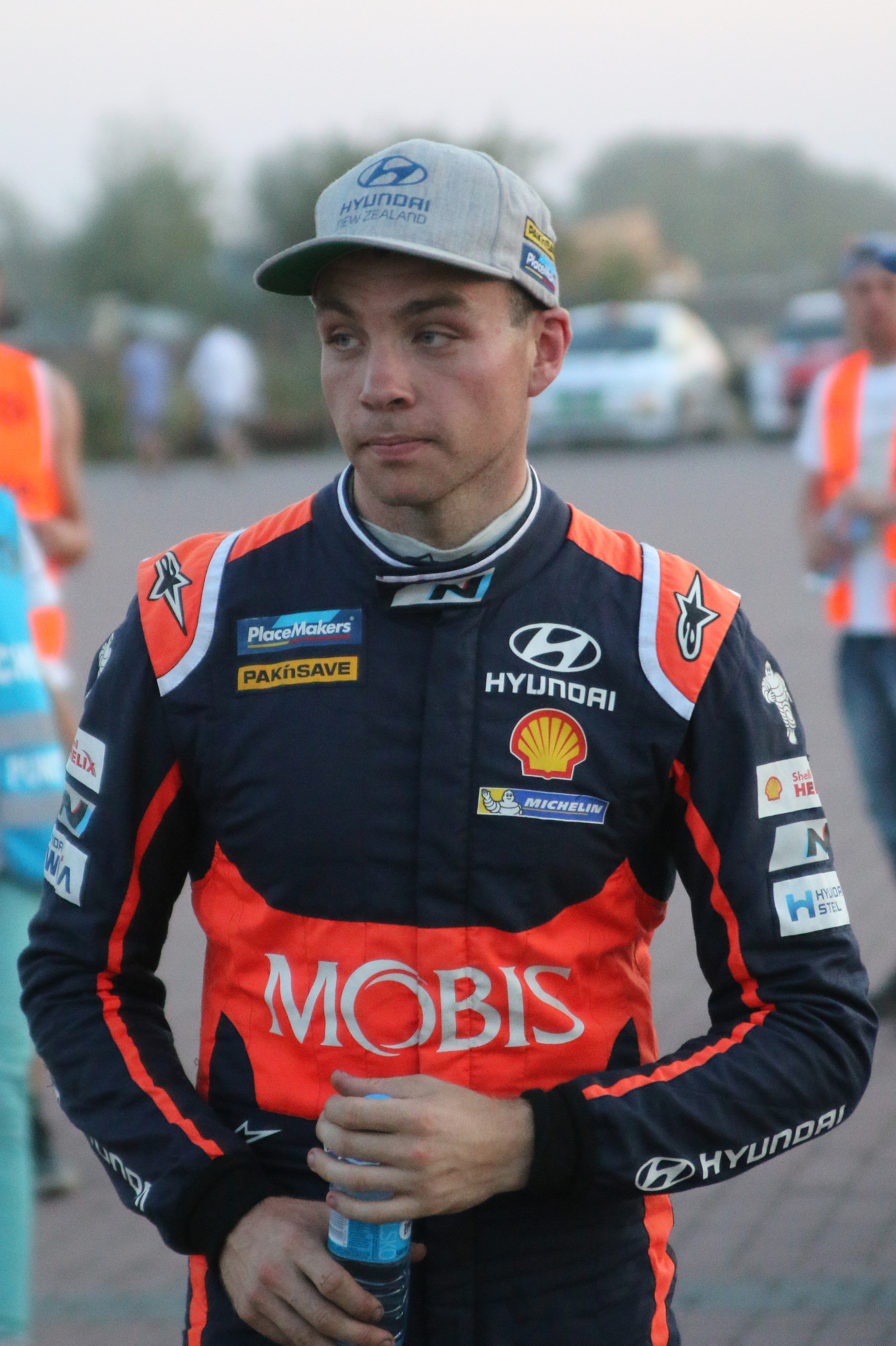
Hayden Paddon won his first ERC drivers' championship.

== Competitions ==
- FIA ERC: Main open championship for all current FIA-homologated cars within sporting classes RC2 to RC5, with Rally2 cars the leading contenders.
- FIA ERC3: Second tier, specifically for the Rally3 class.
- FIA ERC4: Third ERC tier, the first for front-wheel-drive cars. Allows Rally4 and Rally5 cars.
- FIA ERC Junior: For drivers aged 27 and under on 1 January 2023 in Rally4 and Rally5 cars on Hankook tyres. This championship will be contested over six of the eight rounds.
- FIA European Rally Championship for Teams: each team can nominate a maximum of three cars (from all categories), counting the two highest-placed cars from each team.

== Calendar ==
The 2023 season is contested over eight rounds across Central, Northern and Southern Europe.

Round	Start date	Finish date	Rally	Rally headquarters	Surface	Stages	Distance	Ref.
1	10 March	12 March	(Portugal) Rally Serras de Fafe e Felgueiras	Fafe, Braga	Gravel	17	180.29 km	
2	4 May	6 May	(Spain) Rally Islas Canarias	Las Palmas, Canary Islands	Tarmac	13	190.06 km	
3	20 May	21 May	Rally Poland	Mikołajki, Warmia-Masuria	Gravel	16	182.06 km	
4	17 June	18 June	(Latvia) Rally Liepāja	Liepāja, Liepāja	Gravel	10	183.89 km	
5	6 July	8 July	(Sweden) Royal Rally of Scandinavia	Karlstad, Värmland	Gravel	16	185.18 km	
6	29 July	30 July	(Italy) Rally di Roma Capitale	Fiuggi, Lazio	Tarmac	13	189.50 km	
7	18 August	20 August	(Czech Republic) Barum Czech Rally Zlín	Zlín, Zlín Region	Tarmac	13	200.43 km	
8	6 October	8 October	Rally Hungary	Nyíregyháza, Szabolcs-Szatmár-Bereg	Tarmac	12	180.22 km	

=== Calendar changes ===
- Rally Azores and Rally Catalunya were removed from the calendar.
- Rally Hungary returned to the calendar after a one-year absence.
- Royal Rally of Scandinavia, which runs on former Rally Sweden stages, was introduced to the calendar.

== Regulation changes ==
Rallies are held over four days. It will also consist of Free Practice and the Qualifying Stage for Rally2 drivers. Starting positions for the leg one are chosen by the drivers, 15 first from the Qualifying Stage choosing first, followed by the drivers with FIA Priority Status, then point scorers from the 2022 ERC season, and then remaining Rally2 drivers.

The first 15 cars run at 2-minute intervals, rest at 1-minute intervals. For the leg two, first 15 cars run in reverse order based on the leg one classification.

== Entry list ==
=== ERC ===
Rally2 and R5 entries
Entrant	Car	Driver	Co-Driver	Tyres	Rounds
(Czech Republic) ACCR Entry Engineering	Škoda Fabia Rally2 evo	(Czech Republic) Filip Mareš	(Czech Republic) Radovan Bucha	P	All
(Czech Republic) Agrotec Škoda Rally Team	Škoda Fabia RS Rally2	(Czech Republic) Jan Kopecký	(Czech Republic) Jan Hloušek	M	7
(Czech Republic) Auto Podbabská Škoda Mol Team	Škoda Fabia R5	(Czech Republic) Dominik Stříteský	(Czech Republic) Jiří Hovorka	H	7
(Hungary) Bilteknik TRT Citroën Rally Team	Citroën C3 Rally2	(Sweden) Tom Kristensson	(Sweden) Andreas Johansson	P	1-3
(Hungary) Bilteknik TRT Citroën Rally Team	Citroën C3 Rally2	(Norway) Mads Østberg	(Sweden) Patrik Barth	P	8
(Italy) BRC Racing Team	Hyundai i20 N Rally2	(New Zealand) Hayden Paddon	(New Zealand) John Kennard	P	1-7
(Austria) BRR Baumschlager Rallye & Racing Team	Škoda Fabia Rally2 evo	(Germany) Albert von Thurn und Taxis	(Germany) Jara Hain	P	6
(Austria) BRR Baumschlager Rallye & Racing Team	Škoda Fabia RS Rally2	(Germany) Albert von Thurn und Taxis	(Germany) Jara Hain	P	7
(Ukraine) Chervonenko Racing	Škoda Fabia RS Rally2	Alexey Lukyanuk	(Ukraine) Yevgen Chervonenko	P	7
(Spain) Citroën Rally Team	Citroën C3 Rally2	(Spain) Diego Ruiloba	(Spain) Ángel Luis Vela	P	2
(Portugal) Citroën Vodafone Team	Citroën C3 Rally2	(Portugal) José Pedro Fontes	(Portugal) Inês Ponte	P	1
(Spain) Copi Sport	Ford Fiesta Rally2	(Spain) Enrique Cruz	(Spain) Yeray Mújica Eugenio	P	1
(Italy) F.P.F. Sport	Citroën C3 Rally2	(Italy) Andrea Crugnola	(Italy) Pietro Elia Ometto	P	6
GNM Sweden AB	Ford Fiesta Rally2	(Sweden) Dennis Rådström	(Sweden) Johan Johansson	M	3-5
(Hungary) GR Motorsport Kft.	Škoda Fabia Rally2 evo	(Hungary) Miklós Csomós	(Hungary) Attila Nagy	P	1-2
(Hungary) GR Motorsport Kft.	Škoda Fabia Rally2 evo	(Hungary) Miklós Csomós	(Hungary) Viktor Bán	P	6-8
(Spain) Hyundai Canarias Motorsport	Hyundai i20 N Rally2	(Czech Republic) Jan Černý	(Czech Republic) Petr Černohorský	P	2
(Spain) Hyundai Motor España	Hyundai i20 N Rally2	(Spain) Iván Ares	(Spain) José Antonio Pintor Bouzas	P	2
(Spain) Hyundai Motor España	Hyundai i20 N Rally2	(Spain) Óscar Palomo Ortíz	(Spain) Rodolfo del Barrio	P	2
(Hungary) Kole Média Center Kft.	Hyundai i20 N Rally2	(Hungary) Gábor Német	(Hungary) Gergely Németh	P	8
(Poland) Kowax Racing	Hyundai i20 R5	(Czech Republic) Martin Vlček	(Czech Republic) Jakub Kunst	M	7
(Republic of Ireland) Motorsport Ireland Rally Academy	Hyundai i20 N Rally2	(Republic of Ireland) Josh McErlean	(Republic of Ireland) Brian Hoy	P	1
(Republic of Ireland) Motorsport Ireland Rally Academy	Hyundai i20 N Rally2	(Republic of Ireland) Josh McErlean	(Republic of Ireland) John Rowan	P	3
(Republic of Ireland) Motorsport Ireland Rally Academy	Hyundai i20 N Rally2	(Republic of Ireland) Josh McErlean	(Republic of Ireland) James Fulton	P	4-5, 7-8
(Republic of Ireland) Motorsport Ireland Rally Academy	Škoda Fabia R5	(Republic of Ireland) Patrick O'Brien	(Republic of Ireland) Stephen O'Brien	P	1
(Republic of Ireland) Motorsport Ireland Rally Academy	Škoda Fabia R5	(Republic of Ireland) Patrick O'Brien	(Republic of Ireland) Stephen O'Brien	H	5-6
(India) MRF Tyres Dealer Team	Ford Fiesta Rally2	(United Kingdom) Jon Armstrong	(Sweden) Julia Thulin	M	5
(India) MRF Tyres Dealer Team	Škoda Fabia Rally2 evo	(Italy) Andrea Mabellini	(Italy) Virginia Lenzi	M	1-6
(India) MRF Tyres Dealer Team	Citroën C3 Rally2	(Norway) Mads Østberg	(Sweden) Patrik Barth	M	1-5, 7
(India) MRF Tyres Dealer Team	Hyundai i20 N Rally2	(Spain) Javier Pardo Siota	(Spain) Adrián Pérez Fernández	M	2
(India) MRF Tyres Dealer Team	Ford Fiesta Rally2	(Sweden) Pontus Tidemand	(Sweden) Julia Thulin	M	1, 3
(Poland) Plon RT	Ford Fiesta Rally2	(Poland) Jarosław Kołtun	(Poland) Ireneusz Pleskot	P	1-4, 6-7
(Finland) Printsport Oy	Škoda Fabia RS Rally2	(Saudi Arabia) Rakan Al-Rashed	(Finland) Antti Haapala	P	5
(Hungary) Pro-M Kft.	Hyundai i20 N Rally2	(Hungary) Norbert Michelisz	(Hungary) Róbert Tagai	H	8
(Italy) Racing Network	Hyundai i20 N Rally2	(Italy) Andrea Nucita	(Italy) Elia De Guio	M	1
(Italy) Racing Network	Hyundai i20 N Rally2	(Italy) Andrea Nucita	(Italy) Rudy Pollet	M	2
(Italy) Racing Network	Hyundai i20 N Rally2	(Italy) Andrea Nucita	(Italy) Manuel Fenoli	M	3
(Spain) Recalvi Team	Škoda Fabia RS Rally2	(Spain) José Antonio Suárez	(Spain) Alberto Iglesias Pin	M	2
(Estonia) RedGrey Team	Hyundai i20 N Rally2	(Estonia) Georg Linnamäe	(United Kingdom) James Morgan	M	1, 4
(Estonia) RedGrey Team	Ford Fiesta Rally2	(Estonia) Robert Virves	(Portugal) Hugo Magalhães	P	1
(Estonia) RedGrey Team	Ford Fiesta Rally2	(Estonia) Robert Virves	(United Kingdom) Craig Drew	P	4
(Spain) Revys Motor Sport	Citroën C3 Rally2	(Spain) Miguel Ángel Suárez	(Spain) Eduardo González Delgado	P	2
(Slovakia) Rufa Motor-Sport	Škoda Fabia RS Rally2	Alexey Lukyanuk	(Ukraine) Yevgen Chervonenko	P	6
(Czech Republic) Samohýl Škoda Team	Škoda Fabia Rally2 evo	(Czech Republic) Adam Březík	(Czech Republic) Ondřej Krajča	M	7
Team Hyundai Portugal	Hyundai i20 N Rally2	(Republic of Ireland) Craig Breen	(Republic of Ireland) James Fulton	P	1
Team Hyundai Portugal	Hyundai i20 N Rally2	(Portugal) Ricardo Teodósio	(Portugal) José Teixeira	P	1
(India) Team MRF Tyres	Škoda Fabia Rally2 evo	(Italy) Simone Campedelli	(Italy) Tania Canton	M	1-6
(India) Team MRF Tyres	Škoda Fabia RS Rally2	(Spain) Efrén Llarena	(Spain) Sara Fernández	M	1-3, 6
(India) Team MRF Tyres	Škoda Fabia Rally2 evo	(Spain) Efrén Llarena	(Spain) Sara Fernández	M	4-5
(India) Team MRF Tyres	Škoda Fabia R5	(Spain) Efrén Llarena	(Spain) Sara Fernández	M	7-8
(India) Team MRF Tyres	Škoda Fabia RS Rally2	(Latvia) Mārtiņš Sesks	(Latvia) Renārs Francis	M	All
(Estonia) Tehase Auto	Škoda Fabia Rally2 evo	(Estonia) Gregor Jeets	(Estonia) Timo Taniel	P	1
(Finland) TGS	Škoda Fabia RS Rally2	(Finland) Lauri Joona	(Finland) Janni Hussi	P	5
(Germany) Toksport WRT	Volkswagen Polo GTI R5	(Sweden) Oliver Solberg	(United Kingdom) Elliott Edmondson	P	5
(Hungary) Topp-Cars Rally Team	Škoda Fabia Rally2 evo	(Poland) Grzegorz Grzyb	(Poland) Jakub Wróbel	P	2, 6
(Hungary) Topp-Cars Rally Team	Škoda Fabia Rally2 evo	(Poland) Rafał Kwiatkowski	(Poland) Kamil Kozdroń	H	3
(Hungary) Topp-Cars Rally Team	Škoda Fabia Rally2 evo	(Hungary) Martin László	(Hungary) Dávid Berendi	P	All
(Hungary) Topp-Cars Rally Team	Škoda Fabia Rally2 evo	(Hungary) József Trencsényi	(Hungary) Gábor Verba	H	8
(Hungary) Turán Motorsport SE	Volkswagen Polo GTI R5	(Hungary) Frigyes Turán	(Hungary) Ágnes Farnadi	H	8
(Czech Republic) Yacco ACCR Team	Škoda Fabia RS Rally2	(Czech Republic) Erik Cais	(Slovakia) Igor Bacigál	M	1, 3-4, 7-8
Private entries	Hyundai i20 N Rally2	(United Kingdom) Philip Allen	(United Kingdom) Dale Bowen	P	1
Private entries	Hyundai i20 N Rally2	(United Kingdom) Philip Allen	(Republic of Ireland) Darragh Mullen	P	2
Private entries	Hyundai i20 N Rally2	(United Kingdom) Philip Allen	(United Kingdom) Dale Furniss	P	8
Private entries	Škoda Fabia Rally2 evo	(Portugal) Pedro Almeida	(Portugal) Mário Castro	P	1
Private entries	Škoda Fabia Rally2 evo	(Italy) Fabio Andolfi	(Italy) Nicolò Gonella	P	6
Private entries	Škoda Fabia Rally2 evo	(Portugal) Armindo Araújo	(Portugal) Luís Ramalho	M	1
Private entries	Škoda Fabia RS Rally2	(Italy) Giandomenico Basso	(Italy) Lorenzo Granai	P	6
Private entries	Škoda Fabia Rally2 evo	(Italy) Alberto Battistolli	(Italy) Simone Scattolin	P	1
Private entries	Škoda Fabia RS Rally2	(Italy) Alberto Battistolli	(Italy) Simone Scattolin	P	4-6
Private entries	Citroën C3 Rally2	(Italy) Simone Bertolotti	(Italy) Federico Capilli	P	2-4
Private entries	Hyundai i20 R5	(Sweden) William Binbach	(Norway) Jørgen Eriksen	P	5
Private entries	Ford Fiesta Rally2	(Hungary) László Bodolai	(Hungary) Attila Deák	P	8
Private entries	Citroën C3 Rally2	(France) Yoann Bonato	(France) Benjamin Boulloud	M	1-2, 6, 8
Private entries	Škoda Fabia Rally2 evo	(Poland) Łukasz Byśkiniewicz	(Poland) Daniel Siatkowski	M	3
Private entries	Škoda Fabia Rally2 evo	(Portugal) Miguel Correia	(Portugal) Jorge Carvalho	M	1
Private entries	Škoda Fabia Rally2 evo	(Romania) Bogdan Cuzma	(Austria) Ilka Minor	M	1-2
Private entries	Škoda Fabia RS Rally2	(Romania) Bogdan Cuzma	(Austria) Ilka Minor	M	3-5
Private entries	Škoda Fabia RS Rally2	(Romania) Bogdan Cuzma	(Romania) Dorin Pulpea	M	6
Private entries	Škoda Fabia RS Rally2	(Romania) Bogdan Cuzma	(Portugal) Hugo Magalhães	M	7-8
Private entries	Škoda Fabia Rally2 evo	(Italy) Damiano De Tommaso	(Italy) Sofia D'Ambrosio	P	6
Private entries	Škoda Fabia Rally2 evo	(France) Mathieu Franceschi	(France) Jules Escartefigue	M	1-5
Private entries	Škoda Fabia RS Rally2	(France) Mathieu Franceschi	(France) Andy Malfoy	M	6-7
Private entries	Škoda Fabia RS Rally2	(France) Mathieu Franceschi	(France) Benoît Manzo	M	8
Private entries	Ford Fiesta Rally2	(Sweden) Kalle Gustafsson	(Sweden) Magnus Nilsson	P	5
Private entries	Škoda Fabia RS Rally2	Nikolay Gryazin	Konstantin Aleksandrov	P	5
Private entries	Škoda Fabia Rally2 evo	(Poland) Grzegorz Grzyb	(Poland) Adam Binięda	P	3
Private entries	Ford Fiesta Rally2	(Hungary) András Hadik	(Hungary) Krisztián Kertész	P	8
Private entries	Škoda Fabia Rally2 evo	(Finland) Mikko Heikkilä	(Finland) Samu Vaaleri	M	1-5
Private entries	Škoda Fabia RS Rally2	(Finland) Mikko Heikkilä	(Finland) Samu Vaaleri	M	6
Private entries	Volkswagen Polo GTI R5	(United Kingdom) Chris Ingram	(United States) Alexander Kihurani	M	7
Private entries	Škoda Fabia Rally2 evo	(Finland) Lauri Joona	(Finland) Janni Hussi	P	6
Private entries	Volkswagen Polo GTI R5	(Norway) Frank Tore Larsen	(Norway) Torstein Eriksen	P	5
Private entries	Škoda Fabia RS Rally2	(Poland) Mikołaj Marczyk	(Poland) Szymon Gospodarczyk	M	1, 3, 8
Private entries	Škoda Fabia Rally2 evo	(France) Mathieu Margaillan	(France) Mathilde Margaillan	M	1
Private entries	Citroën C3 Rally2	(Italy) Andrea Mazzocchi	(Italy) Silvia Gallotti	P	6
Private entries	Hyundai i20 N Rally2	(Portugal) Pedro Meireles	(Portugal) Pedro Alves	P	1
Private entries	Škoda Fabia Rally2 evo	(Poland) Sylwester Płachytka	(Poland) Jakub Gerber	M	3
Private entries	Škoda Fabia Rally2 evo	(United Kingdom) Osian Pryce	(Belgium) Stéphane Prévot	M	3-4
Private entries	Škoda Fabia Rally2 evo	(Italy) Antonio Rusce	(Italy) Martina Musiari	P	6
Private entries	Volkswagen Polo GTI R5	(Italy) Giacomo Scattolon	(Italy) Sauro Farnocchia	P	6
Private entries	Ford Fiesta Rally2	(Portugal) Lucas Simões	(Portugal) Nuno Almeida	M	1
Private entries	Citroën C3 Rally2	(Italy) Rachele Somaschini	(Italy) Nicola Arena	P	1-3, 5-7
Private entries	Citroën C3 Rally2	(Portugal) Bernardo Sousa	(Portugal) Inês Veiga	P	1
Private entries	Škoda Fabia Rally2 evo	(Romania) Simone Tempestini	(Romania) Sergiu Itu	P	1, 3, 6-7
Private entries	Volkswagen Polo GTI R5	(Norway) Ole Christian Veiby	(Sweden) Jonas Andersson	P	5
Private entries	Škoda Fabia Rally2 evo	(Hungary) Ferenc Vincze	(Hungary) Nándor Percze	H	8
Private entries	Škoda Fabia RS Rally2	(Austria) Simon Wagner	(Austria) Gerald Winter	M	1-2, 6-7
Private entries	Hyundai i20 N Rally2	(Paraguay) Fabrizio Zaldivar	(Italy) Marcelo Der Ohannesian	P	1
Entrylists:

=== ERC3 ===
Rally3 entries
Entrant	Car	Driver	Co-Driver	Tyres	Rounds
M-Sport Poland	Ford Fiesta Rally3	(United Kingdom) Jon Armstrong	(Republic of Ireland) Andrew Browne	P	1
M-Sport Poland	Ford Fiesta Rally3	(United Kingdom) Jon Armstrong	(United Kingdom) Cameron Fair	P	2-4, 6-7
M-Sport Poland	Ford Fiesta Rally3	(Republic of Ireland) William Creighton	(Republic of Ireland) Liam Regan	P	5
(India) MRF Tyres Dealer Team	Renault Clio Rally3	(Italy) Paolo Andreucci	(Italy) Rudy Briani	M	6
(Poland) Rallytechnology	Ford Fiesta Rally3	(Poland) Piotr Parys	(Poland) Damian Syty	P	3-4
Private entries	Ford Fiesta Rally3	(Latvia) Dmitry Feofanov	(Latvia) Normunds Kokins	P	5
Private entries	Ford Fiesta Rally3	(Poland) Jakub Matulka	(Poland) Daniel Dymurski	P	3-4, 7
Private entries	Renault Clio Rally3	(Argentina) Paulo Soria	(Spain) Axel Coronado Jiménez	M	3
Private entries	Renault Clio Rally3	(Argentina) Paulo Soria	(Romania) Sergiu Itu	M	4
Private entries	Ford Fiesta Rally3	(Poland) Igor Widłak	(Poland) Mateusz Pawłowski	P	7

=== ERC-4 ===
Rally4 and R3 entries
Entrant	Car	Driver	Co-Driver	Tyres	Rounds	Category
(Germany) ADAC Opel Rallye Junior Team	Opel Corsa Rally4	(Germany) Timo Schulz	(Germany) Michael Wenzel	H	3-8	ERC4J
(Slovenia) AMD Gorica	Opel Corsa Rally4	(Slovenia) Mark Škulj	(Slovenia) Pia Šumer	H	6-7	ERC4J
(Slovenia) AMD Gorica	Opel Corsa Rally4	(Slovenia) Mark Škulj	(Slovenia) Matej Čar	H	8	ERC4J
CKR Estonia	Peugeot 208 Rally4	(Estonia) Joosep Ralf Nõgene	(Estonia) Aleks Lesk	P	1	
GK Door Team Sweden	Ford Fiesta Rally4	(Sweden) Patrik Hallberg	(Sweden) John Stigh	H	5	ERC4J
(Hungary) Herczig ASE	Peugeot 208 Rally4	(Hungary) Patrik Herczig	(Hungary) Kristóf Varga	H	3, 8	ERC4J
(Slovenia) IK Sport Racing	Ford Fiesta Rally4	(Sweden) Mille Johansson	(Sweden) Johan Grönvall	H	3-7	ERC4J
(Slovenia) IK Sport Racing	Opel Corsa Rally4	(Sweden) Mille Johansson	(Sweden) Johan Grönvall	H	8	ERC4J
(Hungary) Kole Média Center Kft.	Peugeot 208 Rally4	(Hungary) Csaba Juhász	(Hungary) Tamás Pásztor	P	6	
(Republic of Ireland) Motorsport Ireland Rally Academy	Peugeot 208 Rally4	(Republic of Ireland) Aoife Raftery	(United Kingdom) Claire Williams	H	3-4	ERC4J
(Republic of Ireland) Motorsport Ireland Rally Academy	Peugeot 208 Rally4	(Republic of Ireland) Aoife Raftery	(Republic of Ireland) Arthur Kierans	H	5	ERC4J
(Republic of Ireland) Motorsport Ireland Rally Academy	Peugeot 208 Rally4	(Republic of Ireland) Aoife Raftery	(Republic of Ireland) Ronan Comerford	H	6-7	ERC4J
(Hungary) Prestige Motorsport Kft.	Peugeot 208 Rally4	(Hungary) Bendegúz Hangodi	(Hungary) László Bunkoczi	P	2, 4	
(Mexico) Team Escuderia TV4	Peugeot 208 Rally4	(Mexico) Patrice Spitalier	(Mexico) Nicolas Spitalier	H	5-6	ERC4J
Team Estonia Autosport	Peugeot 208 Rally4	(Estonia) Karl-Markus Sei	(Estonia) Martin Leotoots	H	4	ERC4J
Team Estonia Autosport	Ford Fiesta Rally4	(Estonia) Jaspar Vaher	(Estonia) Evelin Mitendorf	H	4	ERC4J
(Japan) Toyota Gazoo Racing WRT NG	Renault Clio Rally4	(Japan) Hikaru Kogure	(Finland) Topi Matias Luhtinen	P	3-4	
(Japan) Toyota Gazoo Racing WRT NG	Renault Clio Rally4	(Japan) Nao Otake	(Finland) Marko Salminen	P	3-4	
(Japan) Toyota Gazoo Racing WRT NG	Renault Clio Rally4	(Japan) Yuki Yamamoto	(Finland) Miika Teiskonen	P	3-4	
(Estonia) TRT Motorsport MTÜ	Ford Fiesta Rally4	(Estonia) Mark-Egert Tiits	(Estonia) Jakko Viilo	H	4-5	ERC4J
(Austria) Waldherr Motorsport Team	Opel Corsa Rally4	(Austria) Christoph Brugger	(Germany) Tamara Lutz	P	3	
(Austria) Waldherr Motorsport Team	Opel Corsa Rally4	(Romania) Cristiana Oprea	(Romania) Denisa-Alexia Parteni	P	7	
(Austria) Waldherr Motorsport Team	Opel Corsa Rally4	(Austria) Fabian Zeiringer	(Austria) Angelika Letz	H	3-4, 6-7	ERC4J
Private entries	Peugeot 208 Rally4	(Sweden) Simon Andersson	(Sweden) Jörgen Jönsson	H	3-4	ERC4J
Private entries	Renault Clio Rally4	(Sweden) Simon Andersson	(Sweden) Jörgen Jönsson	H	5	ERC4J
Private entries	Peugeot 208 Rally4	(Portugal) Ernesto Cunha	(Portugal) Carlos Magalhães	P	1	
Private entries	Peugeot 208 Rally4	(Italy) Roberto Daprà	(Italy) Luca Guglielmetti	P	1-2	
Private entries	Peugeot 208 Rally4	(Italy) Roberto Daprà	(Italy) Luca Guglielmetti	H	3-8	ERC4J
Private entries	Renault Clio R3	(Italy) Alessandro Grillo	(Italy) Enrico Bracchi	M	2	
Private entries	Peugeot 208 Rally4	(Hungary) Bendegúz Hangodi	(Hungary) László Bunkoczi	P	3, 6	
Private entries	Peugeot 208 Rally4	(Hungary) Bendegúz Hangodi	(Hungary) Attila Nagy	P	8	
Private entries	Peugeot 208 Rally4	(Sweden) Victor Hansen	(Sweden) Victor Johansson	H	3-7	ERC4J
Private entries	Ford Fiesta Rally4	(Finland) Miko Jalava	(Finland) Riikka Hakkanen	H	3	ERC4J
Private entries	Ford Fiesta Rally4	(Finland) Miko Jalava	(Finland) Matias Peippo	H	4-5	ERC4J
Private entries	Ford Fiesta Rally4	(Poland) Tymoteusz Jocz	(Poland) Maciej Judycki	P	1, 3	
Private entries	Peugeot 208 Rally4	(Austria) Alfred Kramer	(Denmark) Jeannette Kvick	H	3-5	ERC4J
Private entries	Peugeot 208 Rally4	(Germany) Norman Kreuter	(Denmark) Jeannette Kvick	P	1-2, 6, 8	
Private entries	Peugeot 208 Rally4	(Germany) Norman Kreuter	(Germany) Maresa Lade	P	3, 5	
Private entries	Peugeot 208 Rally4	(Germany) Norman Kreuter	(Germany) Anna-Maria Seidl	P	4, 7	
Private entries	Peugeot 208 Rally4	(Romania) Norbert Maior	(Romania) Francesca Maior	H	3-8	ERC4J
Private entries	Opel Corsa Rally4	(United Kingdom) Max McRae	(Republic of Ireland) Mac Kierans	H	3-5, 7-8	ERC4J
Private entries	Peugeot 208 Rally4	(United Kingdom) Max McRae	(Republic of Ireland) Mac Kierans	H	6	ERC4J
Private entries	Renault Clio Rally4	(Portugal) Hugo Mesquita	(Portugal) Valter Cordaso	P	1	
Private entries	Peugeot 208 Rally4	(Chile) Patricio Muñoz	(Argentina) Miguel Recalt	P	1	
Private entries	Peugeot 208 Rally4	(Germany) René Noller	(Germany) Natalie Solbach-Schmidt	H	3-4, 6	ERC4J
Private entries	Opel Corsa Rally4	(Norway) Ola Nore	(Norway) Rune Eilertsen	H	8	ERC4J
Private entries	Renault Clio Rally4	(Norway) Ola Nore	(Norway) Rune Eilertsen	H	3, 5-6	ERC4J
Private entries	Renault Clio Rally4	(Norway) Ola Nore	(Norway) Torstein Eriksen	H	4	ERC4J
Private entries	Opel Corsa Rally4	(Poland) Marek Nowak	(Poland) Adrian Sadowski	P	3	
Private entries	Ford Fiesta Rally4	(Sweden) Isak Reiersen	(Sweden) Lucas Karlsson	H	5	ERC4J
Private entries	Peugeot 208 Rally4	(France) Ghjuvanni Rossi	(France) Nicolas Blanc	P	3	
Private entries	Peugeot 208 Rally4	(France) Ghjuvanni Rossi	(France) Kylian Sarmezan	M	6	
Private entries	Peugeot 208 Rally4	(France) Ghjuvanni Rossi	(France) Kylian Sarmezan	M	7	
Private entries	Peugeot 208 Rally4	(Mexico) Patrice Spitalier	(Mexico) Nicolas Spitalier	H	3	ERC4J
Private entries	Peugeot 208 Rally4	(Czech Republic) Jaromír Tarabus	(Czech Republic) Daniel Trunkát	H	7	
Private entries	Peugeot 208 Rally4	(Italy) Mattia Zanin	(Italy) Fabio Pizzol	H	3-6	ERC4J
Private entries	Peugeot 208 Rally4	(Italy) Mattia Zanin	(Italy) Elia De Guio	H	7-8	ERC4J
Rally5 entries
Private entries	Renault Clio Rally5	(Romania) Ciprian Lupu	(Romania) Andrei George Pintilii	M	6	
Private entries	Renault Clio Rally5	(Bulgaria) Aleksandar Tomov	(Bulgaria) Yavor Brankov	H	6	

== Results and standings ==
=== Season summary ===
Round	Event	Winning driver	Winning co-driver	Winning entrant	Winning time	Report	Ref.
1	(Portugal) Rally Serras de Fafe e Felgueiras	(New Zealand) Hayden Paddon	(New Zealand) John Kennard	(Italy) BRC Racing Team	1:42:21.3	Report	
2	(Spain) Rally Islas Canarias	(France) Yoann Bonato	(France) Benjamin Boulloud	(France) Yoann Bonato	1:55:05.8	Report	
3	Rally Poland	(Latvia) Mārtiņš Sesks	(Latvia) Renārs Francis	(India) Team MRF Tyres	1:34:57.8	Report	
4	(Latvia) Rally Liepāja	(Latvia) Mārtiņš Sesks	(Latvia) Renārs Francis	(India) Team MRF Tyres	1:22:47.3	Report	
5	(Sweden) Royal Rally of Scandinavia	(Sweden) Oliver Solberg	(United Kingdom) Elliott Edmondson	(Germany) Toksport WRT	1:29:36.4	Report	
6	(Italy) Rally di Roma Capitale	(Italy) Andrea Crugnola	(Italy) Pietro Ometto	(Italy) F.P.F. Sport	1:52:35.2	Report	
7	(Czech Republic) Barum Czech Rally Zlín	(Czech Republic) Jan Kopecký	(Czech Republic) Jan Hloušek	(Czech Republic) Agrotec Škoda Rally Team	1:53:09.4	Report	
8	Rally Hungary	(Norway) Mads Østberg	(Sweden) Patrik Barth	(India) Team MRF Tyres	1:37:40.2	Report	

=== Scoring system ===
Points for final position are awarded as in the following table in ERC, ERC3 and ERC4. In ERC, ERC3 and ERC4, the best seven scores from the eight rounds count towards the final number of points. In Junior category, best five rounds of six count.

Position	1st	2nd	3rd	4th	5th	6th	7th	8th	9th	10th	11th	12th	13th	14th	15th
Points	30	24	21	19	17	15	13	11	9	7	5	4	3	2	1

There are also five bonus points awarded to the winners of the Power Stage, four points for second place, three for third, two for fourth and one for fifth. Power Stage points are awarded only in the main ERC drivers' and co-drivers' championships.

Position	1st	2nd	3rd	4th	5th
Points	5	4	3	2	1

=== Drivers' Championships ===
==== ERC ====
Pos	Driver	PRT (Portugal)	CAN (Spain)	POL (Poland)	LAT (Latvia)	SWE (Sweden)	ITA (Italy)	CZE (Czech Republic)	HUN (Hungary)	Points	Best 7
1	(New Zealand) Hayden Paddon	1^{2}	2	2^{3}	2^{2}	2^{1}	3	Ret		163	163
2	(Latvia) Mārtiņš Sesks	12^{5}	8^{5}	1^{5}	1^{1}	3^{2}	Ret	11	3	134	134
3	(Norway) Mads Østberg	2	16	4^{1}	3	8		Ret	1^{1}	115	115
4	(Spain) Efrén Llarena	7	3	10	9	Ret	4	8	10^{5}	88	88
5	(France) Yoann Bonato	5	1				6^{3}		4	84	84
6	(France) Mathieu Franceschi	14	6	6^{4}	6^{5}	7	Ret	9	9	81	81
7	(Czech Republic) Filip Mareš	33	11	11	11^{4}	6	9^{4}	5^{3}	12^{2}	71	71
8	(Austria) Simon Wagner	17	5^{2}				5	3^{1}		64	64
9	(Finland) Mikko Heikkilä	8	18	5^{2}	7	12	Ret			49	49
10	(Hungary) Miklós Csomós	10	Ret				7^{2}	2^{5}	Ret	49	49
11	(Czech Republic) Erik Cais	Ret		9	12			7^{2}	6	45	45
12	(Poland) Mikołaj Marczyk	4		3					18	44	44
13	(Republic of Ireland) Josh McErlean	19		7	4^{3}	31		12	Ret	39	39
14	(Estonia) Georg Linnamäe	3^{3}			8					35	35
15	(Sweden) Oliver Solberg					1^{3}				33	33
16	(Czech Republic) Jan Kopecký							1^{4}		32	32
17	(Italy) Andrea Mabellini	Ret	13^{1}	Ret	13	9	10^{1}			32	32
18	(Italy) Andrea Crugnola						1			30	30
19	(Hungary) Ferenc Vincze								2^{4}	26	26
20	(Romania) Simone Tempestini	11		8			15	10		25	25
21	(Italy) Giandomenico Basso						2			24	24
22	(Poland) Grzegorz Grzyb		10^{4}	14			8			22	22
23	Nikolay Gryazin					4^{4}				21	21
24	(Finland) Lauri Joona					5^{5}	14			21	21
25	(Republic of Ireland) Craig Breen	6^{1}								20	20
26	(Spain) Iván Ares		4							19	19
27	(Czech Republic) Adam Březík							4		19	19
28	(Estonia) Robert Virves	16^{4}			5					19	19
29	(Hungary) Frigyes Turán								5	17	17
30	(Italy) Andrea Nucita	Ret	7^{3}	Ret						16	16
31	(Czech Republic) Dominik Stříteský							6		15	15
32	(Hungary) Martin László	Ret	15	Ret	17	14	Ret	Ret	8	14	14
33	(Italy) Simone Campedelli	23	Ret	15	10	Ret	11^{5}			14	14
34	(Hungary) Gábor Német								7	13	13
35	(Sweden) Tom Kristensson	9	12	Ret						13	13
36	(Spain) José Antonio Suárez		9							9	9
37	(Sweden) Kalle Gustafsson					10				7	7
38	(Sweden) Pontus Tidemand	13		13						6	6
39	(United Kingdom) Jon Armstrong	20	19	20	18	11	13	Ret		5	5
40	(Hungary) András Hadik								11	5	5
41	(Romania) Bogdan Cuzma	27	21	Ret	30	29	25	13	14	5	5
42	(Italy) Alberto Battistolli	Ret			15	13	15			5	5
43	(Sweden) Dennis Rådström			12	16	Ret				4	4
44	(Germany) Albert von Thurn und Taxis						12	Ret		4	4
45	(Hungary) Norbert Michelisz								13	3	3
46	(Italy) Rachele Somaschini	28	20	26		17	19	14		2	2
47	(United Kingdom) Osian Pryce			16	14					2	2
48	(Czech Republic) Jan Černý		14							2	2
49	(Republic of Ireland) Patrick O'Brien	21				15	17			1	1
50	(Portugal) Miguel Correia	15								1	1

Key
Colour	Result
Gold	Winner
Silver	2nd place
Bronze	3rd place
Green	Points finish
Blue	Non-points finish
Blue	Non-classified finish (NC)
Purple	Did not finish (Ret)
Black	Excluded (EX)
Black	Disqualified (DSQ)
White	Did not start (DNS)
White	Cancelled (C)
Blank	Withdrew entry from the event (WD)

Notes:
^{1 2 3 4 5} – Power Stage position

==== ERC3 ====
Pos	Driver	PRT (Portugal)	CAN (Spain)	POL (Poland)	LAT (Latvia)	SWE (Sweden)	ITA (Italy)	CZE (Czech Republic)	HUN (Hungary)	Points	Best 7
1	(United Kingdom) Jon Armstrong	1	1	1	1		1	Ret		150	150
2	(Poland) Jakub Matulka			2	2			2		72	72
3	(Poland) Piotr Parys			3	3					42	42
4	(Republic of Ireland) William Creighton					1				30	30
5	(Poland) Igor Widłak							1		30	30
6	(Italy) Paolo Andreucci						2			24	24
7	(Argentina) Paulo Soria			Ret	4					19	19

==== ERC4 ====
Pos	Driver	PRT (Portugal)	CAN (Spain)	POL (Poland)	LAT (Latvia)	SWE (Sweden)	ITA (Italy)	CZE (Czech Republic)	HUN (Hungary)	Points	Best 7
1	(Italy) Roberto Daprà	1	Ret	5	7	4	1	4	2	152	152
2	(Romania) Norbert Maior			2	3	3	3	5	1	134	134
3	(Norway) Ola Nore			1	1	6	4		5	111	111
4	(Germany) Timo Schulz			Ret	6	13	2	1	7	85	85
5	(Sweden) Victor Hansen			3	2	8	9	6		80	80
6	(Germany) Norman Kreuter	5	2	14	12	11	10	8	Ret	70	70
7	(Italy) Mattia Zanin			13	9	Ret	5	7	8	53	53
8	(Hungary) Bendegúz Hangodi		1	10	8		Ret		Ret	48	48
9	(United Kingdom) Max McRae			11	5	12	8	Ret	9	46	46
10	(Sweden) Mille Johansson			Ret	11	5	11	Ret	6	42	42
11	(Slovenia) Mark Škulj						6	Ret	3	36	36
12	(Austria) Fabian Zeiringer			Ret	Ret		7	3		34	34
13	(Sweden) Isak Reiersen					1				30	30
14	(Poland) Tymoteusz Jocz	4		9						28	28
15	(Estonia) Mark-Egert Tiits				4	9				28	28
16	(Portugal) Ernesto Cunha	2								24	24
17	(Sweden) Patrik Hallberg					2				24	24
18	(Czech Republic) Jaromír Tarabus							2		24	24
19	(Chile) Patricio Muñoz	3								21	21
20	(Italy) Alessandro Grillo		3							21	21
21	(Republic of Ireland) Aoife Raftery			12	10	Ret	15	9		21	21
22	(Hungary) Patrik Herczig			15					4	20	20
23	(Japan) Hikaru Kogure			4	Ret					19	19
24	(Finland) Miko Jalava			6	Ret	Ret				15	15
25	(Sweden) Simon Andersson			Ret	14	7				15	15
26	(France) Ghjuvanni Rossi			7			14	Ret		15	15
27	(Austria) Christoph Brugger			8						11	11
28	(Austria) Alfred Kramer			Ret	13	10				10	10
29	(Romania) Cristiana Oprea							10		7	7
30	(Mexico) Patrice Spitalier			16		14	12			6	6
31	(Hungary) Csaba Juhász						13			3	3
32	(Germany) René Noller			Ret	15		Ret			1	1

==== Junior ERC ====
Pos	Driver	POL (Poland)	LAT (Latvia)	SWE (Sweden)	ITA (Italy)	CZE (Czech Republic)	HUN (Hungary)	Points	Best 5
1	(Romania) Norbert Maior	2	3	3	3	4	1	136	117
2	(Italy) Roberto Daprà	4	7	4	1	3	2	126	113
3	(Norway) Ola Nore	1	1	6	4		5	111	111
4	(Germany) Timo Schulz	Ret	6	12	2	1	7	86	86
5	(Sweden) Victor Hansen	3	2	8	9	5		82	82
6	(Italy) Mattia Zanin	8	8	Ret	5	6	8	65	65
7	(United Kingdom) Max McRae	6	5	11	8	Ret	9	57	57
8	(Sweden) Mille Johansen	Ret	10	5	10	Ret	6	46	46
9	(Republic of Ireland) Aoife Raftery	7	9	Ret	12	7		39	39
10	(Austria) Fabian Zeiringer	Ret	Ret		7	2		37	37
11	(Slovenia) Mark Škulj				6	Ret	3	36	36
12	(Sweden) Isak Reiersen			1				30	30
13	(Estonia) Mark-Egert Tiits		4	9				28	28
14	(Hungary) Patrik Herczig	9					4	28	28
15	(Sweden) Patrik Hallberg			2				24	24
16	(Finland) Miko Jalava	5	Ret	Ret				17	17
17	(Sweden) Simon Andersson	Ret	12	7				17	17
18	(Mexico) Patrice Spitalier	10		13	11			15	15
19	(Austria) Alfred Kramer	Ret	11	10				12	12
20	(Germany) René Noller	Ret	13		Ret			3	3

=== Co-drivers' championships ===
==== ERC ====
Pos	Co-Driver	PRT (Portugal)	CAN (Spain)	POL (Poland)	LAT (Latvia)	SWE (Sweden)	ITA (Italy)	CZE (Czech Republic)	HUN (Hungary)	Points	Best 7
1	(New Zealand) John Kennard	1^{2}								34	34
2	(Sweden) Patrik Barth	2								24	24
3	(United Kingdom) James Morgan	3^{3}								24	24
4	(Republic of Ireland) James Fulton	6^{1}								20	20
5	(Poland) Szymon Gospodarczyk	4								19	19
6	(France) Benjamin Boulloud	5								17	17
7	(Spain) Sara Fernández	7								17	17
8	(Finland) Samu Vaaleri	8								11	11
9	(Sweden) Andreas Johansson	9								9	9
10	(Hungary) Attila Nagy	10								7	7
11	(Romania) Sergiu Itu	11								5	5
12	(Latvia) Renārs Francis	12^{5}								5	5
13	(Sweden) Julia Thulin	13								3	3
14	(France) Jules Escartefigue	14								2	2
15	(Portugal) Hugo Magalhães	16^{4}								2	2
16	(Portugal) Jorge Eduardo Carvalho	15								1	1

Key
Colour	Result
Gold	Winner
Silver	2nd place
Bronze	3rd place
Green	Points finish
Blue	Non-points finish
Blue	Non-classified finish (NC)
Purple	Did not finish (Ret)
Black	Excluded (EX)
Black	Disqualified (DSQ)
White	Did not start (DNS)
White	Cancelled (C)
Blank	Withdrew entry from the event (WD)

Notes:
^{1 2 3 4 5} – Power Stage position

==== ERC3 ====
Pos	Co-Driver	PRT (Portugal)	CAN (Spain)	POL (Poland)	LAT (Latvia)	SWE (Sweden)	ITA (Italy)	CZE (Czech Republic)	HUN (Hungary)	Points	Best 7
1	(Republic of Ireland) Andrew Browne	1								30	30

==== ERC4 ====
Pos	Co-Driver	PRT (Portugal)	CAN (Spain)	POL (Poland)	LAT (Latvia)	SWE (Sweden)	ITA (Italy)	CZE (Czech Republic)	HUN (Hungary)	Points	Best 7
1	(Italy) Luca Guglielmetti	1								30	30
2	(Portugal) Carlos Magalhaes	2								24	24
3	(Argentina) Miguel Recalt	3								21	21
4	(Poland) Maciej Judycki	4								19	19
5	(Denmark) Jeannette Kvick	5								17	17

=== Teams' championship ===
Pos	Team	PRT (Portugal)	CAN (Spain)	POL (Poland)	LAT (Latvia)	SWE (Sweden)	ITA (Italy)	CZE (Czech Republic)	HUN (Hungary)	Points
1	(India) MRF Tyres Dealer Team	24+9								33
2	(Italy) BRC Racing Team	30								30
3	(Estonia) RedGrey	21+7								28
4	(India) Team MRF Tyres	17+11								28
5	Team Hyundai Portugal	19+2								21
6	(Hungary) Bilteknik TRT Citroën Rally Team	15								15
7	(Hungary) GR Motorsport Kft.	13								13
8	(Republic of Ireland) Motorsport Ireland Rally Academy	5+3								8
9	M-Sport Poland	4								4
10	(Portugal) Citroën Vodafone Team	1								1
