= 2015 Rally Australia =

Tenth round of the 2015 World Rally Championship season

Rally Australia 2015: 24. Coates Hire Rally Australia
Round 10 of the 2015 World Rally Championship season
← Previous event	Next event →
- Host country: Australia
- Rally base: Coffs Harbour, Australia
- Dates run: September 10, 840 – September 13, 1326
- Stages: 17 (311.36 km; 193.47 miles)
- Stage surface: Gravel

Overall results
- Overall winner: (France) Sébastien Ogier (France) Julien Ingrassia (Germany) Volkswagen Motorsport

The 2015 Rally Australia was the tenth round of the 2015 World Rally Championship season. The rally was won by Sébastien Ogier.

== Entry list ==
The following entries were eligible for WRC points.

No.	Driver	Co-Driver	Entrant	Car	Championship eligibility	Tyre
1	(France) Sébastien Ogier	(France) Julien Ingrassia	(Germany) Volkswagen Motorsport	Volkswagen Polo R WRC	WRC	MI
2	(Finland) Jari-Matti Latvala	(Finland) Miikka Anttila	(Germany) Volkswagen Motorsport	Volkswagen Polo R WRC	WRC	MI
3	(United Kingdom) Kris Meeke	(Republic of Ireland) Paul Nagle	(France) Citroën Total Abu Dhabi WRT	Citroën DS3 WRC	WRC	MI
4	(France) Stéphane Lefebvre	(Belgium) Stéphane Prévot	(France) Citroën Total Abu Dhabi WRT	Citroën DS3 WRC	WRC	MI
5	(United Kingdom) Elfyn Evans	(United Kingdom) Daniel Barritt	(United Kingdom) M-Sport World Rally Team	Ford Fiesta RS WRC	WRC	MI
6	(Estonia) Ott Tänak	(Estonia) Raigo Mõlder	(United Kingdom) M-Sport World Rally Team	Ford Fiesta RS WRC	WRC	MI
7	(Belgium) Thierry Neuville	(Belgium) Nicolas Gilsoul	(South Korea) Hyundai Motorsport	Hyundai i20 WRC	WRC	MI
8	(New Zealand) Hayden Paddon	(New Zealand) John Kennard	(South Korea) Hyundai Motorsport	Hyundai i20 WRC	WRC	MI
9	(Norway) Andreas Mikkelsen	(Norway) Ola Fløene	(Germany) Volkswagen Motorsport II	Volkswagen Polo R WRC	WRC	MI
20	(Spain) Dani Sordo	(Spain) Marc Martí	(South Korea) Hyundai Motorsport N	Hyundai i20 WRC	WRC	MI
31	(Saudi Arabia) Yazeed Al-Rajhi	(United Kingdom) Michael Orr	(Saudi Arabia) Yazeed Racing	Ford Fiesta RRC	WRC, WRC-2	P
37	(Italy) Lorenzo Bertelli	(Italy) Lorenzo Granai	(Italy) FWRT s.r.l.	Ford Fiesta RS WRC	WRC	P
38	(Ukraine) Yuriy Protasov	(Ukraine) Pavlo Cherepin	(Ukraine) Yuriy Protasov	Ford Fiesta RRC	WRC, WRC-2	P
39	(Qatar) Nasser Al-Attiyah	(France) Mathieu Baumel	(Qatar) Nasser Al-Attiyah	Ford Fiesta RRC	WRC, WRC-2	MI
40	(Qatar) Abdulaziz Al-Kuwari	(United Kingdom) Marshall Clarke	Youth & Sports Qatar Rally Team	Ford Fiesta RRC	WRC, WRC-2	?
42	(Australia) Scott Pedder	(Australia) Dale Moscatt	(United Kingdom) Drive DMACK 2	Ford Fiesta R5	WRC, WRC-2	DM
43	(Italy) Gianluca Linari	(Italy) Nicola Arena	(Italy) Gianluca Linari	Subaru Impreze WRX STi	WRC, WRC-2	?
44	(Australia) Nathan Quinn	(Australia) David Calder	(Italy) www.rallyproject.com SRL	Mitsubishi Lancer Evo X	WRC, WRC-2	?
80	(Australia) Rhys Pinter	(United Kingdom) Phil Hall	(Australia) Rhys Pinter	Ford Fiesta R2	WRC	?
81	(Australia) Stephen Raymond	(Australia) Glen Raymond	(Australia) Stephen Raymond	Ford Fiesta R2	WRC	?

== Special stages ==
Day	Stage number	Stage name	Length	Stage winner	Car No.	Team	Time	Rally leader
11 Sep	SS1	(Australia) Utungun 1	7.88 km	(Spain) Dani Sordo (Spain) Marc Martí	20	(Germany) Hyundai Motorsport N	4:59.4	(Spain) Dani Sordo (Spain) Marc Martí
11 Sep	SS2	(Australia) Bakers Creek 1	16.75 km	(Spain) Dani Sordo (Spain) Marc Martí	20	(Germany) Hyundai Motorsport N	10:09.1	(Spain) Dani Sordo (Spain) Marc Martí
11 Sep	SS3	(Australia) Northbank 1	8.42 km	(Spain) Dani Sordo (Spain) Marc Martí	20	(Germany) Hyundai Motorsport N	5:53.6	(Spain) Dani Sordo (Spain) Marc Martí
11 Sep	SS4	(Australia) Newry Long 1	29.51 km	(United Kingdom) Kris Meeke (Republic of Ireland) Paul Nagle	3	(France) Citroën Total Abu Dhabi World Rally Team	16:56.7	(United Kingdom) Kris Meeke (Republic of Ireland) Paul Nagle
11 Sep	SS5	(Australia) Utungun 2	7.88 km	(Finland) Jari-Matti Latvala (Finland) Miikka Anttila	2	(Germany) Volkswagen Motorsport	4:53.4	(United Kingdom) Kris Meeke (Republic of Ireland) Paul Nagle
11 Sep	SS6	(Australia) Bakers Creek 2	16.75 km	(Finland) Jari-Matti Latvala (Finland) Miikka Anttila	2	(Germany) Volkswagen Motorsport	9:50.8	(United Kingdom) Kris Meeke (Republic of Ireland) Paul Nagle
11 Sep	SS7	(Australia) Northbank 2	8.42 km	(Finland) Jari-Matti Latvala (Finland) Miikka Anttila	2	(Germany) Volkswagen Motorsport	5:47.3	(United Kingdom) Kris Meeke (Republic of Ireland) Paul Nagle
11 Sep	SS8	(Australia) Newry Long 2	29.51 km	(France) Sébastien Ogier (France) Julien Ingrassia	1	(Germany) Volkswagen Motorsport	16:35.5	(Finland) Jari-Matti Latvala (Finland) Miikka Anttila
12 Sep	SS9	(Australia) Nambucca 1	50.80 km	(New Zealand) Hayden Paddon (New Zealand) John Kennard	8	(Germany) Hyundai Motorsport	28:25.1	(United Kingdom) Kris Meeke (Republic of Ireland) Paul Nagle
12 Sep	SS10	(Australia) Valla 1	7.94 km	(New Zealand) Hayden Paddon (New Zealand) John Kennard	8	(Germany) Hyundai Motorsport	4:24.8	(United Kingdom) Kris Meeke (Republic of Ireland) Paul Nagle
12 Sep	SS11	(Australia) Nambucca 2	50.80 km	(France) Sébastien Ogier (France) Julien Ingrassia	1	(Germany) Volkswagen Motorsport	27:47.6	(United Kingdom) Kris Meeke (Republic of Ireland) Paul Nagle
12 Sep	SS12	(Australia) Valla 2	7.94 km	(France) Sébastien Ogier (France) Julien Ingrassia	1	(Germany) Volkswagen Motorsport	4:25.1	(France) Sébastien Ogier (France) Julien Ingrassia
13 Sep	SS13	(Australia) Bucca Long 1	21.95 km	(France) Sébastien Ogier (France) Julien Ingrassia	1	(Germany) Volkswagen Motorsport	12:29.7	(France) Sébastien Ogier (France) Julien Ingrassia
13 Sep	SS14	(Australia) Wedding Bells 1	9.23 km	(France) Sébastien Ogier (France) Julien Ingrassia	1	(Germany) Volkswagen Motorsport	5:13.0	(France) Sébastien Ogier (France) Julien Ingrassia
13 Sep	SS15	(Australia) Settles Rd	6.40 km	(France) Sébastien Ogier (France) Julien Ingrassia	1	(Germany) Volkswagen Motorsport	3:06.6	(France) Sébastien Ogier (France) Julien Ingrassia
13 Sep	SS16	(Australia) Bucca Long 2	21.95 km	(France) Sébastien Ogier (France) Julien Ingrassia	1	(Germany) Volkswagen Motorsport	12:24.1	(France) Sébastien Ogier (France) Julien Ingrassia
13 Sep	SS17	(Australia) Wedding Bells 2 (Power Stage)	9.23 km	(France) Sébastien Ogier (France) Julien Ingrassia	1	(Germany) Volkswagen Motorsport	5:11.2	(France) Sébastien Ogier (France) Julien Ingrassia
