= Ashley Forest Rallysprint =

The Ashley Forest Rallysprint is a rallysprint automobile racing event held annually in Ashley Forest, New Zealand.

It first ran in 1979 and was won by Steve Millen in a Vauxhall Chevette.

The current course was created in 1980 and was won by John Woolf in a Mazda RX-3

The current course record is set by Hayden Paddon which he set in 2026 with a 51.20 in his Hyundai i20 AP4++

== Overall winners ==
Year	Driver	Car	Time
1979	(New Zealand) Steve Millen	Vauxhall Chevette	N/a
1980	(New Zealand) John Woolf	Mazda RX-3	1:10.81
1981	(New Zealand) Paul Adams	Ford Escort RS	1:08.77
1982	(New Zealand) Reg Cook	Nissan Sunny	1:08.09
1983	(New Zealand) Neil Allport	Ford Escort RS	1:09.49
1984	(New Zealand) Reg Cook	Nissan Sunny	1:06.18
1985	(New Zealand) Trevor Crowe	Toyota Starlet - V8	1:04.69
1986	No Event		
1987	(New Zealand) Tony Teesdale	MG Metro 6R4	1:05.04
1988	(New Zealand) Rod Millen	Mazda RX-7 4WD	0:59.14
1989	(New Zealand) Possum Bourne	Subaru RX	1:05.28
1990	(New Zealand) Rod Millen	Mazda RX-7 4WD	1:01.30
1991	(New Zealand) Possum Bourne	Subaru Legacy RS	1:01.15
1992	No Event		
1993	(New Zealand) Kim Austin	Nissan Pulsar GTIR	0:58.27
1994	No Event		
1995	No Event		
1996	No Event		
1997	No Event		
1998	(New Zealand) Kim Austin	Mitsubishi Starion V8 4WD	0:58.96
1999	(New Zealand) Kim Austin	Mitsubishi Starion V8 4WD	0:56.57
2000	(New Zealand) Possum Bourne	Subaru Impreza WRC 98	0:56.99
2001	No Event		
2002	(New Zealand) Marty Roestenberg	Mitsubishi Lancer Evo III	1:00.86
2003	(New Zealand) Evan O'Leary	Mitsubishi Lancer Evo I	0:59.16
2004	(New Zealand) Steve Murphy	Mitsubishi Cordia V8 4WD	1:01.23
2005	(New Zealand) Marty Roestenberg	Subaru Impreza	0:58.99
2006	No Event		
2007	(New Zealand) Glenn Frew	Mitsubishi Lancer Evo I	1:03.92
2008	(New Zealand) Steve Murphy	Mitsubishi Cordia V8 4WD	0:59.89
2009	(New Zealand) Steve Murphy	Mitsubishi Cordia V8 4WD	0:59.18
2010	(New Zealand) Glenn Inkster	Mitsubishi Lancer Evo 6.5	0:57.40
2011	(New Zealand) Hayden Paddon	Mitsubishi Cordia V8 4WD	0:57.16
2012	(New Zealand) John Silcock	Mitsubishi Lancer Evo VI	0:59.70
2013	(New Zealand) Chris West	Mitsubishi Lancer Evolution X	1:04.54
2014	(New Zealand) Matt Summerfield	Mitsubishi Cordia V8 4WD	1:01.09
2015	(New Zealand) Matt Summerfield	Subaru Impreza WRX STI	1:03.41
2016	(New Zealand) Matt Summerfield	Mitsubishi Mirage AP4+	0:56.72
2017	(New Zealand) Sloan Cox	Mitsubishi Lancer Evo VIII	0:55.13
2018	(Scotland) Alister McRae	Subaru Impreza WRC 98	0:55.35
2019	(New Zealand) Hayden Paddon	Hyundai i20 AP4++	0:52.77
2020	Cancelled due to COVID-19		
2021	Cancelled due to COVID-19		
2022	(New Zealand) Hayden Paddon	Hyundai Kona	0:55.54
2023	(New Zealand) Hayden Paddon	Hyundai i20 AP4++	0:52.00
2024	(New Zealand) Hayden Paddon	Hyundai i20 WRC	0:53.88
2025	(New Zealand) Hayden Paddon	Hyundai i20 AP4++	0:52.62
2026	(New Zealand) Hayden Paddon	Hyundai i20 AP4++	0:51.20

== Multiple winners ==
=== Drivers ===
Wins	Driver	Years
7	(New Zealand) Hayden Paddon	2011, 2019, 2022, 2023, 2024, 2025, 2026
3	(New Zealand) Possum Bourne	1989, 1991, 2000
3	(New Zealand) Kim Austin	1993, 1998, 1999
3	(New Zealand) Steve Murphy	2004, 2008, 2009
3	(New Zealand) Matt Summerfield	2014, 2015, 2016
2	(New Zealand) Reg Cook	1982, 1984
2	(New Zealand) Rod Millen	1988, 1990
2	(New Zealand) Marty Roestenberg	2002, 2005

=== Manufacturers ===
Wins	Manufacturer	Years
15	(Japan) Mitsubishi	1998, 1999, 2002, 2003, 2004, 2007, 2008, 2009, 2010, 2011, 2012, 2013, 2014, 2016, 2017
6	(Japan) Subaru	1989, 1991, 2000, 2005, 2015, 2018
6	(South Korea) Hyundai	2019, 2022, 2023, 2024, 2025, 2026
3	(Japan) Mazda	1980, 1988, 1990
3	(Japan) Nissan	1982, 1984, 1993
2	(United States) Ford	1981, 1983

== Records ==
Class	Driver	Car	Year	Time
Overall	(New Zealand) Hayden Paddon	Hyundai i20 AP4++	2026	0:51.20
4WD	(New Zealand) Hayden Paddon	Hyundai i20 AP4++	2026	0:51.20
2WD	(New Zealand) Ari Pettigrew	Porsche 911 (997)	2026	0:59.13
