= Oliver Solberg =

Swedish Norwegian rally driver

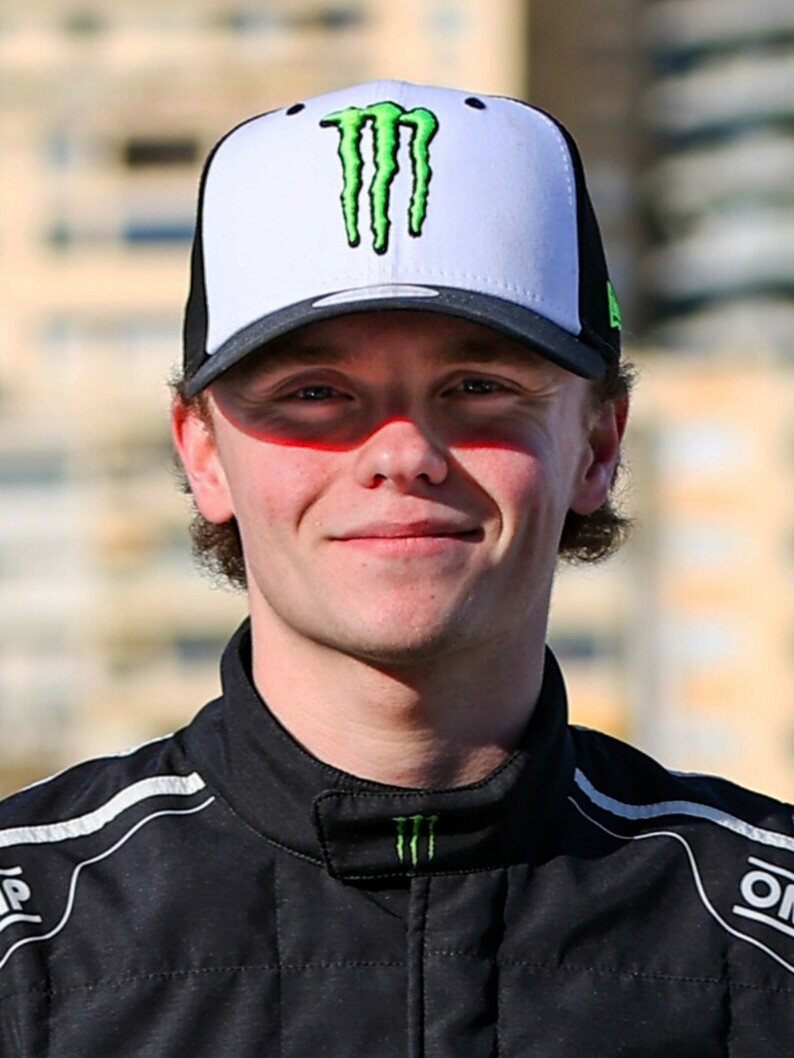
- Solberg at the 2023 Monte Carlo Rally
- Nationality: (Sweden) Swedish (Norway) Norwegian
- Born: 23 September 2001 (age 25) Fredrikstad, Norway
- Relatives: Petter Solberg (father); Henning Solberg (uncle)
World Rally Championship record
- Years active: 2019–present
- Co-driver: (United Kingdom) (Republic of Ireland) Aaron Johnston (United Kingdom) Sebastian Marshall (United Kingdom) Craig Drew (United Kingdom) Elliott Edmondson
- Teams: Toyota Gazoo Racing WRT
- Rallies: 71
- Championships: 0
- Rally wins: 4
- Podiums: 7
- Stage wins: 73
- Total points: 432
- First rally: 2019 Wales Rally GB
- First win: 2025 Rally Estonia
- Last win: 2026 Rally Italia Sardegna
- Last rally: 2026 Rally Italia Sardegna

Oliver Solberg (born 23 September 2001) is a Swedish Norwegian rally driver who competes in the World Rally Championship (WRC) for Toyota Gazoo Racing WRT under the Swedish flag. The son of 2003 World Rally champion Petter Solberg and WRC Commission president Pernilla Solberg, he became the 2025 WRC2 champion alongside co-driver Elliott Edmondson, and achieved his maiden WRC overall victory at a one-off appearance at the 2025 Rally Estonia.

After winning multiple crosskarting championships in his early years, Solberg became the RallyX Nordic Champion in 2018 and the FIA ERC1 Junior Champion in 2020. He made his WRC debut at the 2019 Wales Rally GB. In 2022, Solberg had a permanent part-time seat at the top level of the WRC for the first time as the third driver for Hyundai Motorsport, driving the new Rally1 car. In 2023, Solberg returned to the WRC2 competition, winning his first points-scoring event at the 2023 Rally Sweden. He returned to the top level as a full-time driver in 2026.

== Early life ==
Solberg was introduced to the world of the WRC before his first birthday, when he attended the 2002 Cyprus Rally to watch his father compete. His grandfather and uncle are also experienced rally drivers. Though a career in motorsport wasn't inevitable, as his parents encouraged him to also try football, ice hockey and other activities, he ultimately decided to pursue motorsport. By the age of eight, he was competing in crosskarting, winning his first race. Over the next years, he won multiple Norwegian and Nordic Crosskart Championships.

== Rally career ==
Solberg started his professional rally career in 2017 at 15 years old. Given his young age, one of the few places he was allowed to compete was the Latvian Rally Championship, though he was still too young to drive the road sections which resulted in him and his co-driver Veronica Engan swapping seats between stages. His first rally was Rally Alūksne in a Peugeot 208 R2 where he finished second in his class. He finished the year with two wins. Solberg competed in his second season of the Latvian Rally Championship in 2018, where he finished second in both the LRC3 and U28 categories behind European champion Mārtiņš Sesks.

After two years competing in the Latvian Rally Championship in the R2 class, Solberg stepped into R5 machinery for the 2019 season. He won five consecutive rallies, ultimately winning the Latvian Rally Championship in the Volkswagen Polo GTI R5. One of the rounds of the championship, Rally Liepāja, also counted for the European Rally Championship, meaning he won on his ERC debut against top-level international competition. He also drove six rounds of the American Rally Championship for Subaru USA in a WRX STI, with a livery based on his father's iconic blue and gold WRC Championship-winning car. He claimed victory on only his second outing at the Olympus Rally, and achieved a total of three victories in six races in the 2019 ARA season.

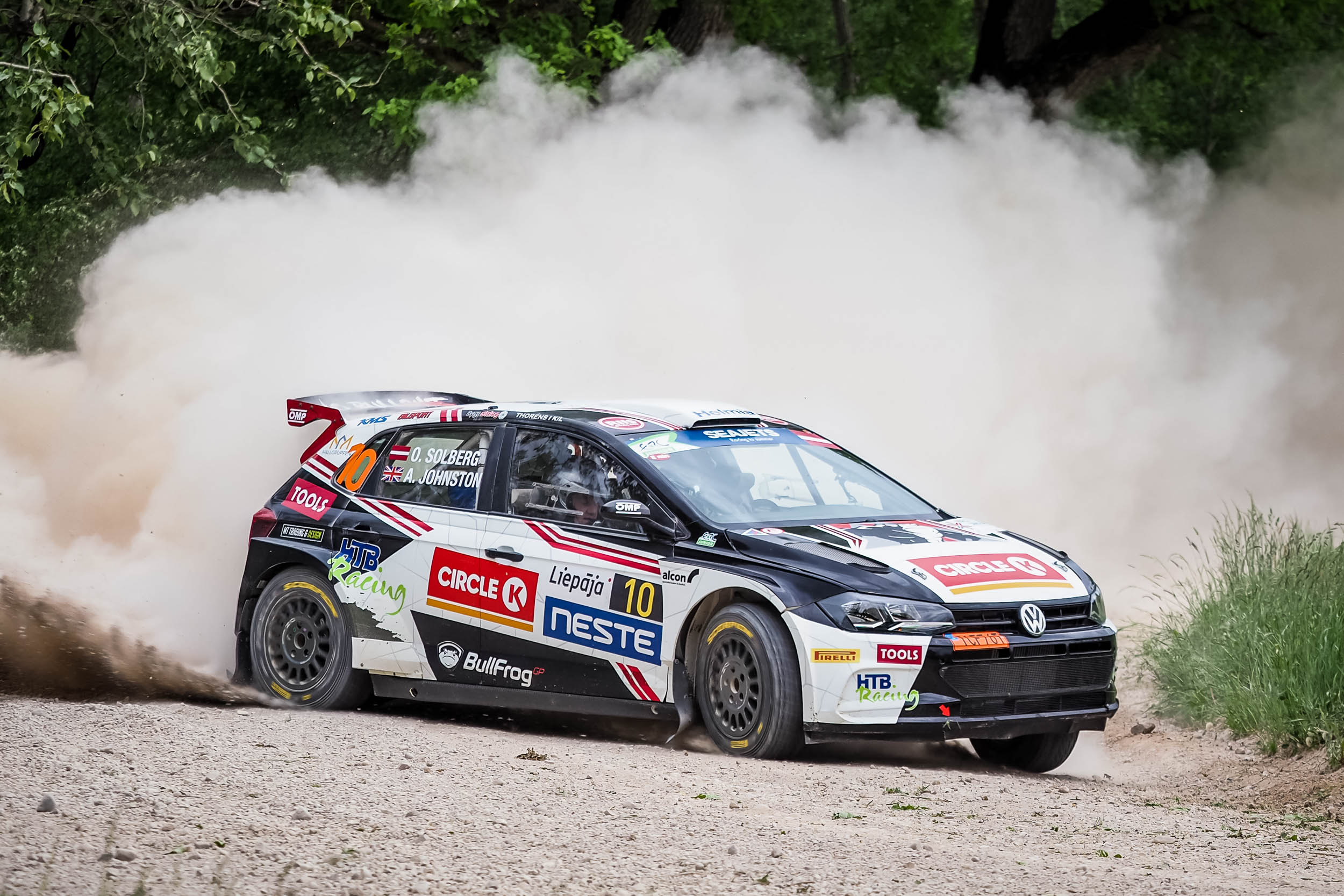
Oliver Solberg at Rally Liepaja 2019

Solberg made his WRC debut at the end of the season at 2019 Wales Rally GB in a Volkswagen Polo GTI R5, showing stage-winning pace but ultimately retiring from the rally. The same rally also marked his father's last WRC event as he signed off with a WRC2 class victory.

After making his WRC debut at the end of 2019, Solberg stepped up into a full WRC campaign in 2020 driving his own VW Polo R5, and also a partial campaign with Škoda Motorsport. The COVID-19 pandemic paused rallying for some time, but as the sport returned, he won the Rally Sweden Lockdown before heading into the FIA ERC and scoring a podium on his full tarmac debut before winning Rally Liepaja for the second year running. When the WRC restarted, Solberg scored his first WRC class win with a WRC3 victory at Rally Estonia. He followed it up with taking home the 2020 FIA ERC1 Junior Championship title.

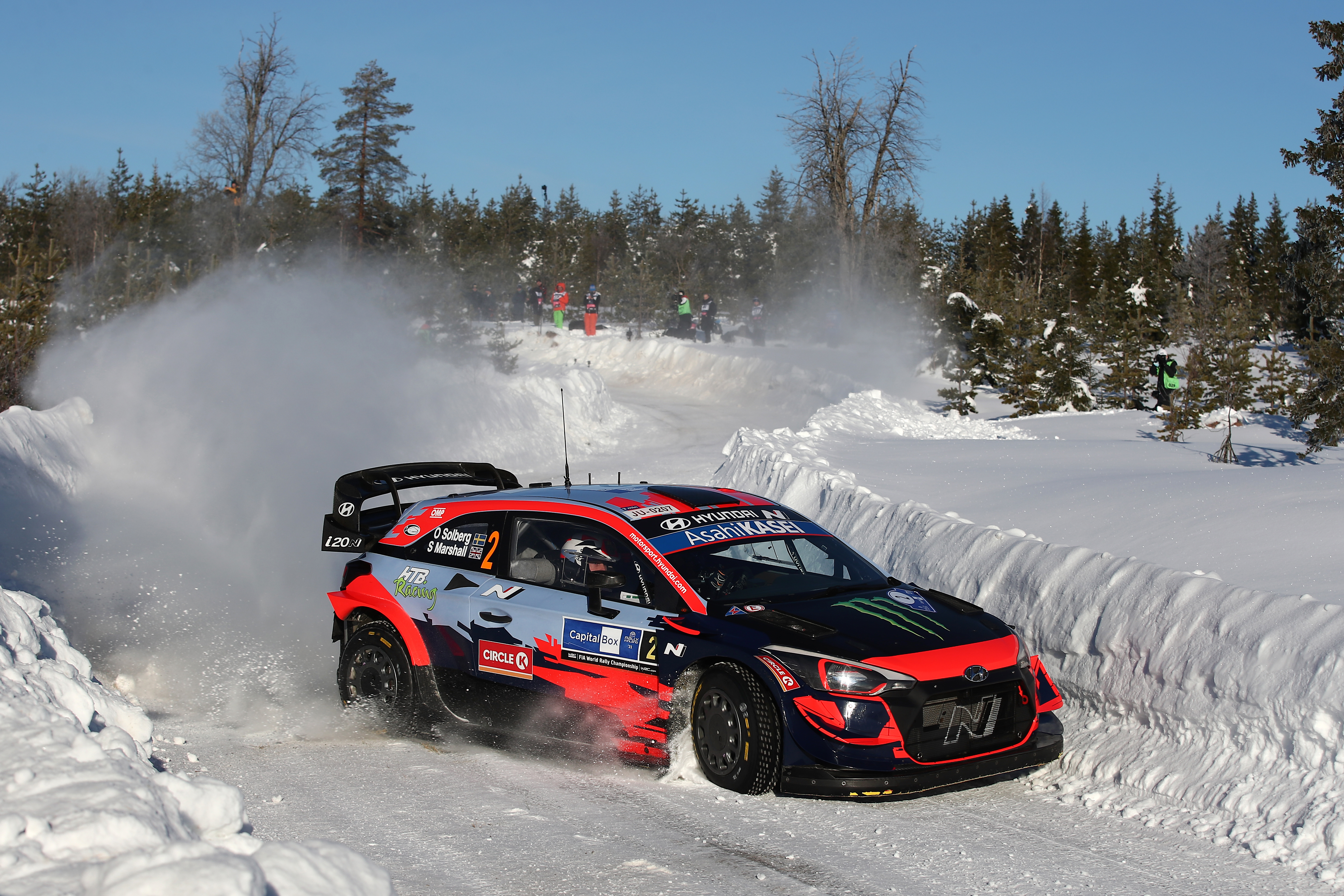
Oliver Solberg making his WRC car debut at the 2021 Arctic Rally

For 2021, Solberg joined the reigning WRC champions, Hyundai Motorsport, with a plan to drive the full WRC-2 season. However, after his debut for the team at the 2021 Monte Carlo Rally driving the Hyundai i20 R5, he was unexpectedly offered the chance to make his top-level WRC debut in the Hyundai i20 Coupe WRC at the second round of the season, Arctic Rally Finland. He went on to finish seventh overall with several top-four stage times. After a series of bad luck through the middle of the year while driving in the WRC2 class, Solberg ended the 2021 season back in the World Rally Car and finished fifth at the 2021 Rally Monza.

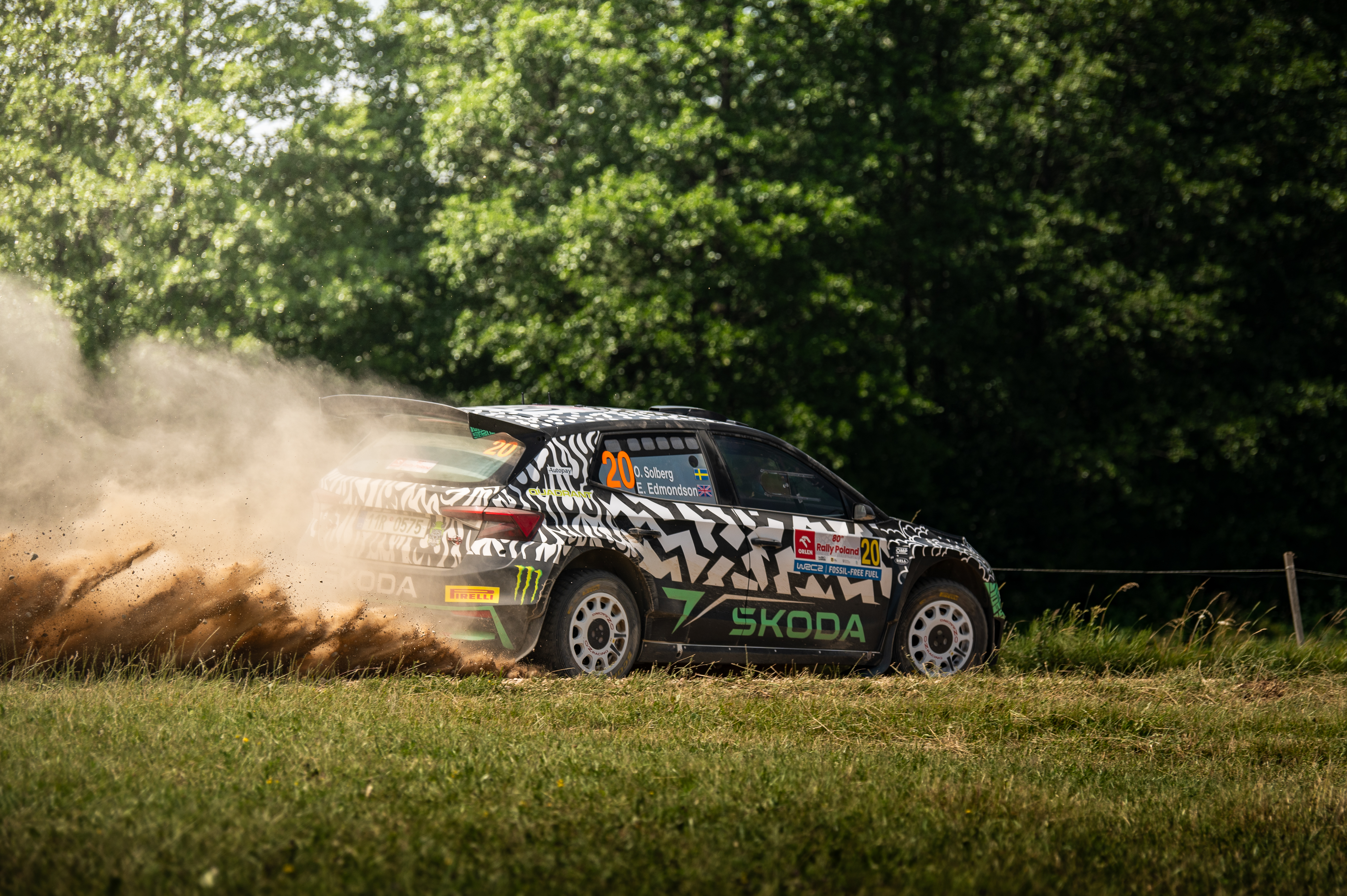
Oliver Solberg during the Orlen 80th Rally Poland

2022 saw Solberg return to Hyundai Motorsport's top-level team, driving as the third driver on selected events throughout the season. He shared the seat with Dani Sordo, with a best finish of fourth at Ypres Rally.

On October 6, 2022, it was announced that Solberg and Hyundai Motorsport would part ways at the end of the season at the end of the contract.

For the 2023 season, Solberg contested a full season in the WRC2 category, piloting the new Škoda Fabia RS Rally2 for Toksport WRT. He concluded his WRC2 campaign with a second class victory of the season at Rally Chile, ending the year sixth in the standings. Solberg was retained by Škoda and Toksport for the 2024 season, with the Swede contesting another full WRC2 campaign. He finished the year as runner-up, winning three events and taking the championship battle with eventual champion Sami Pajari to the final round at Rally Japan. A crash at Rally Portugal and a puncture at Rally Chile ultimately cost Solberg the title, despite him winning more stages in WRC2 than any other driver in 2024.

Off the back of finishing the season as WRC2 runner-up in 2024, Solberg parted ways with Škoda and Toksport WRT. On December 10, 2024, it was announced that Solberg would join Toyota Gazoo Racing WRT and Printsport for the 2025 season, contesting a full WRC2 campaign in the Toyota GR Yaris Rally2. At Rally Estonia, Solberg was given the opportunity to drive the Toyota GR Yaris Rally1 for his first top-line WRC start since the 2022 Rally New Zealand. He dominated the event, winning nine stages en route to his maiden WRC event victory, making himself the first Swedish Rally winner since Kenneth Eriksson at the 1997 Rally New Zealand. In 2025, Solberg finished with five event victories from seven starts, on the way to winning the 2025 WRC2 Championship by 36 points.

Off the back of an impressive 2025 season, Solberg secured a full time drive for the 2026 season with Toyota Gazoo Racing WRT. In 2026, he would finish as runner-up with three rally victories including the Monte Carlo Rally and the final event the Rally Italia Sardegna. The latter of which he entered with an outside chance to clinch the title and after an impressive showing by Solberg, the title would be decided in the final stage. During the final stage it looked as though Solberg would be crowned champion, but with just a few corners to the finish he would lose control and crash his car. Once regaining control of his car, he crossed the line to win the rally by 57.6 seconds, but crucially the crash meant he fell short of the driver's title by five points to Toyota teammate Elfyn Evans as he failed to score any stage point and also lost the Sunday win to teammate Sami Pajari.

== Rallycross career ==
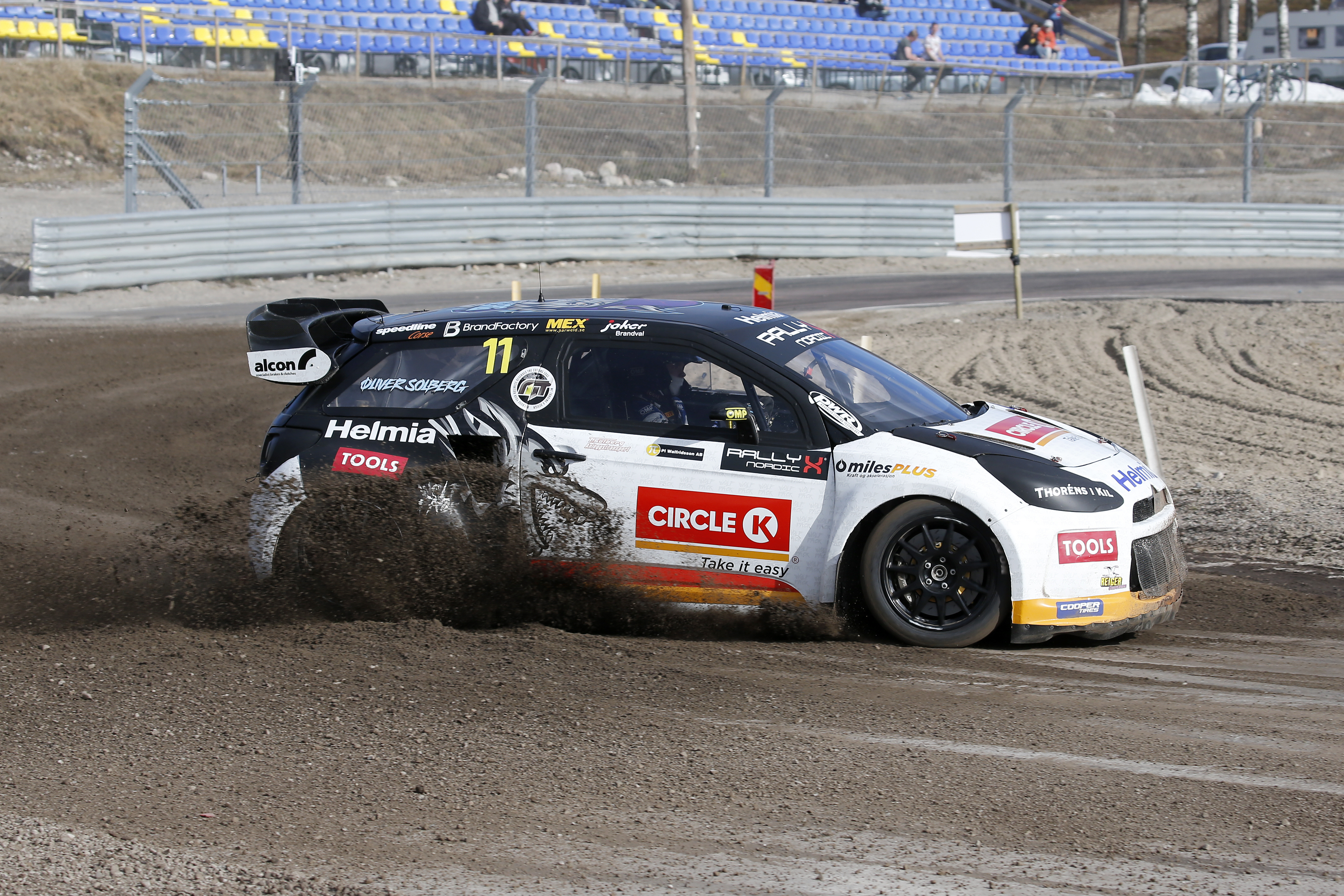
Oliver Solberg at Holjes RX 2018

Alongside his rallying commitments, Solberg also entered the RallyX Nordic Championship in 2017, driving his father's 600bhp FIA World Rallycross Championship-winning DS3. His father had jokingly promised that Solberg could drive the car if he could get all the licences and agreements in place, assuming that it wouldn't be possible given his young age. However, Solberg managed to get things in place in time for the season start. Solberg finished on the podium on his debut, and after winning two events in 2017, he ended the season second in the championship.

Solberg returned to the RallyX Nordic Championship in 2018, taking the Championship title with three overall wins.

In 2020, Solberg made a one-off return to rallycross, driving the DS3 in the All-Star Magic Weekend at Höljes – an event aimed to bring motorsport to people around the world online during the COVID-19 pandemic. He finished third behind World RX drivers Johan Kristoffersson and Robin Larsson. The 'one-off' return became a 'two-off' after he took part in the Euro RX round at Höljes, winning on track ahead of Anton Marklund and Johan Kristoffersson, but later being controversially disqualified for an overweight car.

== Personal life ==
Solberg is the son of the Norwegian 2003 World Rally Champion, Petter Solberg, and Swedish mother Pernilla Solberg (née Walfridsson), who is also a successful former rally driver. His uncle Henning Solberg, cousin Oscar Solberg and grandparents are or have been well-known motorsport competitors. He lives in Gunnarskog, Sweden.

Solberg's 2018 RallyX Nordic title success, as well as his rally career so far and personal journey, was the subject of the 2019 film Born2Drive which was released in cinemas across Norway. Solberg and his family also feature in the Discovery+ and TVNorge series, Team Solberg. Season 1 was released in 2020, and Season 2 was released in 2022.

In 2024, Solberg joined Formula 1 driver Lando Norris' Quadrant Athlete program alongside WMX racer Lotte van Drunen, Moto3 rider Iván Ortolá, and Olympic skateboarder Keegan Palmer.

== Rally victories ==
=== WRC victories ===
| # | Event | Season | Co-driver | Car |
|---|---|---|---|---|
| 1 | 15th Rally Estonia | 2025 | (United Kingdom) Elliott Edmondson | Toyota GR Yaris Rally1 |
| 2 | (Monaco) 94th Monte Carlo Rally | 2026 | (United Kingdom) Elliott Edmondson | Toyota GR Yaris Rally1 |
| 3 | 5th Rally Chile | 2026 | (United Kingdom) Elliott Edmondson | Toyota GR Yaris Rally1 |
| 4 | (Italy) 23rd Rally Italia Sardegna | 2026 | (United Kingdom) Elliott Edmondson | Toyota GR Yaris Rally1 |

=== ERC victories ===
| # | Event | Season | Co-driver | Car |
|---|---|---|---|---|
| 1 | (Latvia) 7th Rally Liepāja | 2019 | (Republic of Ireland) Aaron Johnston | Volkswagen Polo GTI R5 |
| 2 | (Latvia) 8th Rally Liepāja | 2020 | (Republic of Ireland) Aaron Johnston | Volkswagen Polo GTI R5 |
| 3 | (Sweden) 1st Royal Rally of Scandinavia | 2023 | (United Kingdom) Elliott Edmondson | Volkswagen Polo GTI R5 |
| 4 | (Sweden) 2nd Royal Rally of Scandinavia | 2024 | (United Kingdom) Elliott Edmondson | Škoda Fabia RS Rally2 |

=== WRC2 victories ===
| # | Event | Season | Co-driver | Car |
|---|---|---|---|---|
| 1 | 70th Rally Sweden | 2023 | (United Kingdom) Elliott Edmondson | Škoda Fabia RS Rally2 |
| 2 | 2nd Rally Chile | 2023 | (United Kingdom) Elliott Edmondson | Škoda Fabia RS Rally2 |
| 3 | 71st Rally Sweden | 2024 | (United Kingdom) Elliott Edmondson | Škoda Fabia RS Rally2 |
| 4 | 1st Rally Latvia | 2024 | (United Kingdom) Elliott Edmondson | Škoda Fabia RS Rally2 |
| 5 | 73rd Rally Finland | 2024 | (United Kingdom) Elliott Edmondson | Škoda Fabia RS Rally2 |
| 6 | 72nd Rally Sweden | 2025 | (United Kingdom) Elliott Edmondson | Toyota GR Yaris Rally2 |
| 7 | 58th Rally de Portugal | 2025 | (United Kingdom) Elliott Edmondson | Toyota GR Yaris Rally2 |
| 8 | (Greece) 69th Acropolis Rally | 2025 | (United Kingdom) Elliott Edmondson | Toyota GR Yaris Rally2 |
| 9 | 2nd Rally del Paraguay | 2025 | (United Kingdom) Elliott Edmondson | Toyota GR Yaris Rally2 |
| 10 | 4th Rally Chile | 2025 | (United Kingdom) Elliott Edmondson | Toyota GR Yaris Rally2 |

=== WRC3 victories ===
| # | Event | Season | Co-driver | Car |
|---|---|---|---|---|
| 1 | 10th Rally Estonia | 2020 | (Republic of Ireland) Aaron Johnston | Volkswagen Polo GTI R5 |

=== ARA victories ===
| # | Event | Season | Co-driver | Car |
|---|---|---|---|---|
| 1 | 29th Olympus Rally | 2019 | (France) Denis Giraudet | Subaru WRX STI |
| 2 | 43rd Susquehannock Trail Performance Rally | 2019 | (Republic of Ireland) Aaron Johnston | Subaru WRX STI |
| 3 | 24th Lake Superior Performance Rally | 2019 | (Republic of Ireland) Aaron Johnston | Subaru WRX STI |

== Rally record ==
=== WRC results ===
| Year | Entrant | Car | 1 | 2 | 3 | 4 | 5 | 6 | 7 | 8 | 9 | 10 | 11 | 12 | 13 | 14 | WDC | Points |
|---|---|---|---|---|---|---|---|---|---|---|---|---|---|---|---|---|---|---|
| 2019 | Oliver Solberg | Volkswagen Polo GTI R5 | MON | SWE | MEX | FRA | ARG | CHL | POR | ITA | FIN | GER | TUR | GBR; Ret | ESP | AUS; C | NC | 0 |
| 2020 | Oliver Solberg | Volkswagen Polo GTI R5 | MON; 25 | | MEX; Ret | EST; 9 | TUR | | | | | | | | | | 17th | 8 |
| 2020 | Oliver Solberg | Škoda Fabia R5 Evo | | SWE; 17 | | | | ITA; 18 | MNZ; 7 | | | | | | | | 17th | 8 |
| 2021 | Hyundai Motorsport N | Hyundai i20 R5 | MON; Ret | | CRO | POR; 11 | | | EST; Ret | | | | | | | | 13th | 22 |
| 2021 | Hyundai 2C Competition | Hyundai i20 Coupe WRC | | ARC; 7 | | | ITA; WD | KEN; Ret | | | | | ESP; 7 | MNZ; 5 | | | 13th | 22 |
| 2021 | Hyundai Motorsport N | Hyundai i20 N Rally2 | | | | | | | | BEL; Ret | GRE; Ret | FIN; Ret | | | | | 13th | 22 |
| 2022 | Hyundai Shell Mobis WRT | Hyundai i20 N Rally1 | MON; Ret | SWE; 6 | CRO; Ret | | ITA | KEN; 10 | EST; 13 | FIN; Ret | BEL; 4 | GRE | NZL; 5 | ESP | JPN | | 12th | 33 |
| 2022 | Hyundai Motorsport N | Hyundai i20 N Rally2 | | | | POR; 47 | | | | | | | | | | | 12th | 33 |
| 2023 | Oliver Solberg | Škoda Fabia RS Rally2 | MON; 14 | SWE; 8 | MEX; 8 | CRO; 10 | POR; 7 | ITA; 44 | KEN; 9 | EST; 38 | FIN; 6 | GRE; Ret | CHL; 6 | EUR | JPN | | 10th | 33 |
| 2024 | Toksport WRT | Škoda Fabia RS Rally2 | MON; 40 | SWE; 5 | KEN; 7 | CRO | POR; Ret | ITA; DNS | POL; 10 | LAT; 10 | FIN; 5 | GRE | CHL; 11 | EUR; 7 | JPN | | 13th | 27 |
| 2025 | Printsport | Toyota GR Yaris Rally2 | MON; 15 | SWE; 9 | KEN; 12 | ESP; 16 | POR; 10 | ITA; 6 | GRE; 6 | | FIN; 49 | PAR; 7 | CHL; 9 | EUR; 8 | JPN; 7 | SAU; 10 | 9th | 71 |
| 2025 | Toyota Gazoo Racing WRT | Toyota GR Yaris Rally1 | | | | | | | | EST; 1 | | | | | | | 9th | 71 |
| 2026 | Toyota Gazoo Racing WRT | Toyota GR Yaris Rally1 | MON; 1 | SWE; 4 | KEN; 10 | CRO; 42 | ESP; Ret | POR; 2 | JPN; 21 | GRE; 16 | EST; 2 | FIN; 2 | PAR; 5 | CHL; 1 | ITA; 1 | | 2nd | 238 |

* Season still in progress.

=== WRC2 results ===
| Year | Entrant | Car | 1 | 2 | 3 | 4 | 5 | 6 | 7 | 8 | 9 | 10 | 11 | 12 | 13 | 14 | WDC | Points |
|---|---|---|---|---|---|---|---|---|---|---|---|---|---|---|---|---|---|---|
| 2019 | Oliver Solberg | Volkswagen Polo GTI R5 | MON | SWE | MEX | FRA | ARG | CHL | POR | ITA | FIN | GER | TUR | GBR; Ret | ESP | AUS; C | NC | 0 |
| 2021 | Hyundai Motorsport N | Hyundai i20 R5 | MON; WD | ARC | CRO | POR; 5 | ITA | KEN | EST; Ret | | | | | | | | 18th | 10 |
| 2021 | Hyundai Motorsport N | Hyundai i20 N Rally2 | | | | | | | | BEL; Ret | GRE; Ret | FIN; Ret | ESP | MNZ | | | 18th | 10 |
| 2022 | Hyundai Motorsport N | Hyundai i20 N Rally2 | MON | SWE | CRO | POR; 25 | ITA | KEN | EST | FIN | BEL | GRE | NZL | ESP | JPN | | 49th | 3 |
| 2023 | Oliver Solberg | Škoda Fabia RS Rally2 | MON | SWE; 1 | MEX; 3 | CRO | POR; 2 | ITA; 26 | KEN | EST; 16 | FIN | GRE; Ret | CHL; 1 | EUR | JPN | | 6th | 91 |
| 2024 | Toksport WRT | Škoda Fabia RS Rally2 | MON | SWE; 1 | KEN; 2 | CRO | POR; Ret | ITA | POL; 2 | LAT; 1 | FIN; 1 | GRE | CHL; 4 | EUR | JPN | | 2nd | 123 |
| 2025 | Printsport | Toyota GR Yaris Rally2 | MON | SWE; 1 | KEN; 5 | ESP | POR; 1 | ITA | GRE; 1 | EST | FIN; 16 | PAR; 1 | CHL; 1 | EUR | JPN | SAU | 1st | 135 |

=== WRC3 results ===
| Year | Entrant | Car | 1 | 2 | 3 | 4 | 5 | 6 | 7 | WDC | Points |
|---|---|---|---|---|---|---|---|---|---|---|---|
| 2020 | Oliver Solberg | Škoda Fabia R5 Evo | MON | SWE; 5 | | | TUR | ITA; 6 | MNZ; 2 | 4th | 61 |
| 2020 | Oliver Solberg | Volkswagen Polo GTI R5 | | | MEX; Ret | EST; 1 | | | | 4th | 61 |

=== ERC results ===
| Year | Entrant | Car | 1 | 2 | 3 | 4 | 5 | 6 | 7 | 8 | WDC | Points |
|---|---|---|---|---|---|---|---|---|---|---|---|---|
| 2019 | Sports Racing Technologies | Volkswagen Polo GTI R5 | PRT | ESP | LAT; 1 | POL | ITA | CZE | CYP | HUN | 6th | 39 |
| 2020 | Oliver Solberg | Volkswagen Polo GTI R5 | ITA; 3 | LAT; 1 | PRT; 23 | | ESP; 4 | | | | 2nd | 112 |
| 2020 | Oliver Solberg | Škoda Fabia R5 Evo | | | | HUN; 4 | | | | | 2nd | 112 |
| 2023 | Toksport WRT | Volkswagen Polo GTI R5 | PRT | ESP | POL | LAT | SWE; 1 | ITA | CZE | HUN | 15th | 33 |
| 2024 | Oliver Solberg | Škoda Fabia RS Rally2 | HUN | ESP | SWE; 1 | EST | ITA | CZE | GBR | SIL | 12th | 35 |

=== ARA results ===
| Year | Entrant | Car | 1 | 2 | 3 | 4 | 5 | 6 | 7 | 8 | 9 | ARA | Points |
|---|---|---|---|---|---|---|---|---|---|---|---|---|---|
| 2019 | Subaru Motorsports USA | Subaru WRX STI | | 100 2 | OLY 1 | | IDA 9 | NEW 5 | | SUS 1 | LAK 1 | 3rd | 97 |

Sporting positions
| Preceded by Tom Kristensen; Johan Kristoffersson (2019) | Race of Champions Nations' Cup; 2022–2023; With: Petter Solberg | Succeeded by Incumbent |
| Preceded by Sami Pajari | WRC2 Champion; 2025 | Succeeded by Robert Virves |
