= Royal Rally of Scandinavia =

Swedish rally competition

- Status: active
- Genre: motorsporting event
- Date: summer
- Frequency: annual
- Locations: Karlstad, Värmland
- Country: Sweden
- Inaugurated: 2023
- Founder: Swedish Automobile Sports Federation
- Website: ercroyalrally.com

Royal Rally of Scandinavia is a rally event that takes place on gravel roads around the city of Karlstad, Värmland, Sweden. The rally was organized for the first time in 2023 under the name of Royal Rally of Scandinavia, it consisted of 16 stages and 185 km of route, the first edition of this rally was won by the local Swede Oliver Solberg.

In 2023, the event was selected as a round of the European Rally Championship, replacing the Rallye Açores. It was the first Swedish rally to be part of the European Championship since 2003. Another Swede Thomas Rådström won the South Swedish Rally.

== Winners ==
Year	Rally name	Driver	Co-driver	Car	Championship	Sources
2023	I. Bauhaus Royal Rally of Scandinavia	(Sweden) Oliver Solberg	(United Kingdom) Elliott Edmondson	Volkswagen Polo GTI R5	ERC	
2024	II. Bauhaus Royal Rally of Scandinavia	(Sweden) Oliver Solberg	(United Kingdom) Elliott Edmondson	Škoda Fabia RS Rally2	ERC	
2025	III. Bauhaus Royal Rally of Scandinavia	(Norway) Eyvind Brynildsen	(Norway) Jørn Listerud	Toyota GR Yaris Rally2	ERC	
