= Abdón Castañeda =

Spanish painter

- Born: c. 1580; Valencia, Spain
- Died: 30 September 1629; Valencia, Spain
- Occupation: painter
- Notable work: altarpieces of Conception and St. Ursula
- Movement: Spanish Baroque painting

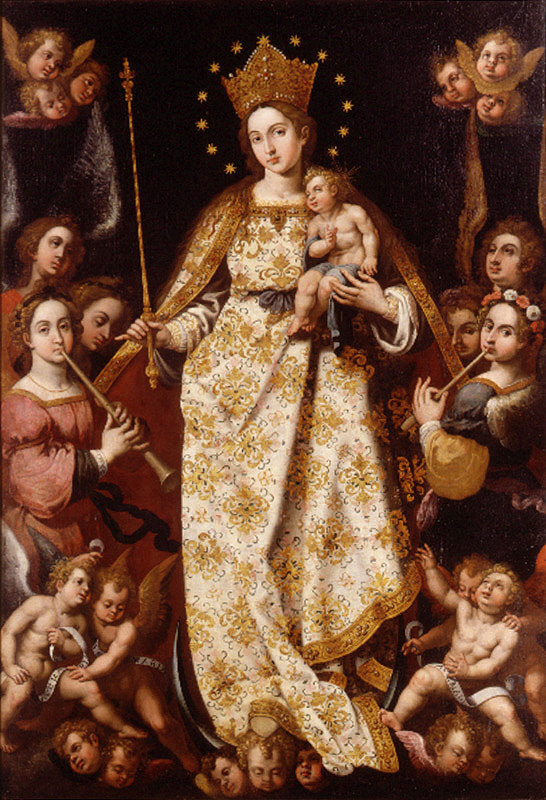
The Virgin with angels musicians by Abdón Castañeda, Museu de Belles Arts de València, 1610

Abdón Castañeda (c. 1580 - 30 September 1629) was a Spanish Baroque painter.

== Biography ==
Little is known of Castañeda's life outside of his works. In 1607 he is mentioned as absent from a meeting of the Association of Artists of Valencia. No more news of him until 1616, which documented the date of his registration in the local Painters Association. By 1620 he moved to Segorbe (Province of Castellón) to work together with Juan de Ribera, and Vicente Castelló in the Augustinian monastery of St. Martin, corresponding to altarpieces of Conception and St. Ursula, completed in 1623. Castañeda's style is defined by elongated canon of the figures, little vertical movement, oval face, friendly and sparsely expressive, surrounded by a multitude of angels using a fleshy archaic concept. No less archaic are the robes, with gold prints minutely described, away from naturalism. The same features are seen in the Virgin angelic musicians of the Museu de Belles Arts de València, from the Convent of the purity of Valencia, but certainly lacking in documentation related to these works of Segorbe.

The same team of Juan Ribalta, Castelló and Castañeda executed between 1621 and 1626 the altarpiece doors Andilla, near Segorbe, which would correspond the Betrothal of the Virgin and the Flight to Egypt, in poor condition. After these works no more news until the reporting his death on 30 September 1629 in Valencia. Castañeda's style has been compared with Francisco Ribalta, and the similarities have resulted in confusions of attribution on some occasions.

== External links and references ==
- Benito Domenech, Fernando, Los Ribalta and Valencian painting of his time, exhibition catalog, Valencia, Madrid, 1987, ISBN 9788450567052
- Kowal, David M. (1985). Ribalta and ribaltescos: the evolution of Baroque style in Valencia. Valencia: Valencia Provincial Council. ISBN 978-84-505-1681-4.
