= Ribalta =

Ribalta is a surname. Notable people with the surname include:

- Francesc Ribalta (1565–1628), Spanish painter
- Imara Esteves Ribalta (born 1978), Cuban beach volleyball player
- José Ribalta (born 1963), Cuban boxer
- Josleidy Ribalta (born 1990), Cuban track and field athlete
- Juan Ribalta (1597–1628), Spanish painter
- Orlando Ribalta (born 1998), Cuban baseball player
