= Saint Francis of Assisi in His Tomb =

1630 painting by Francisco de Zurbarán

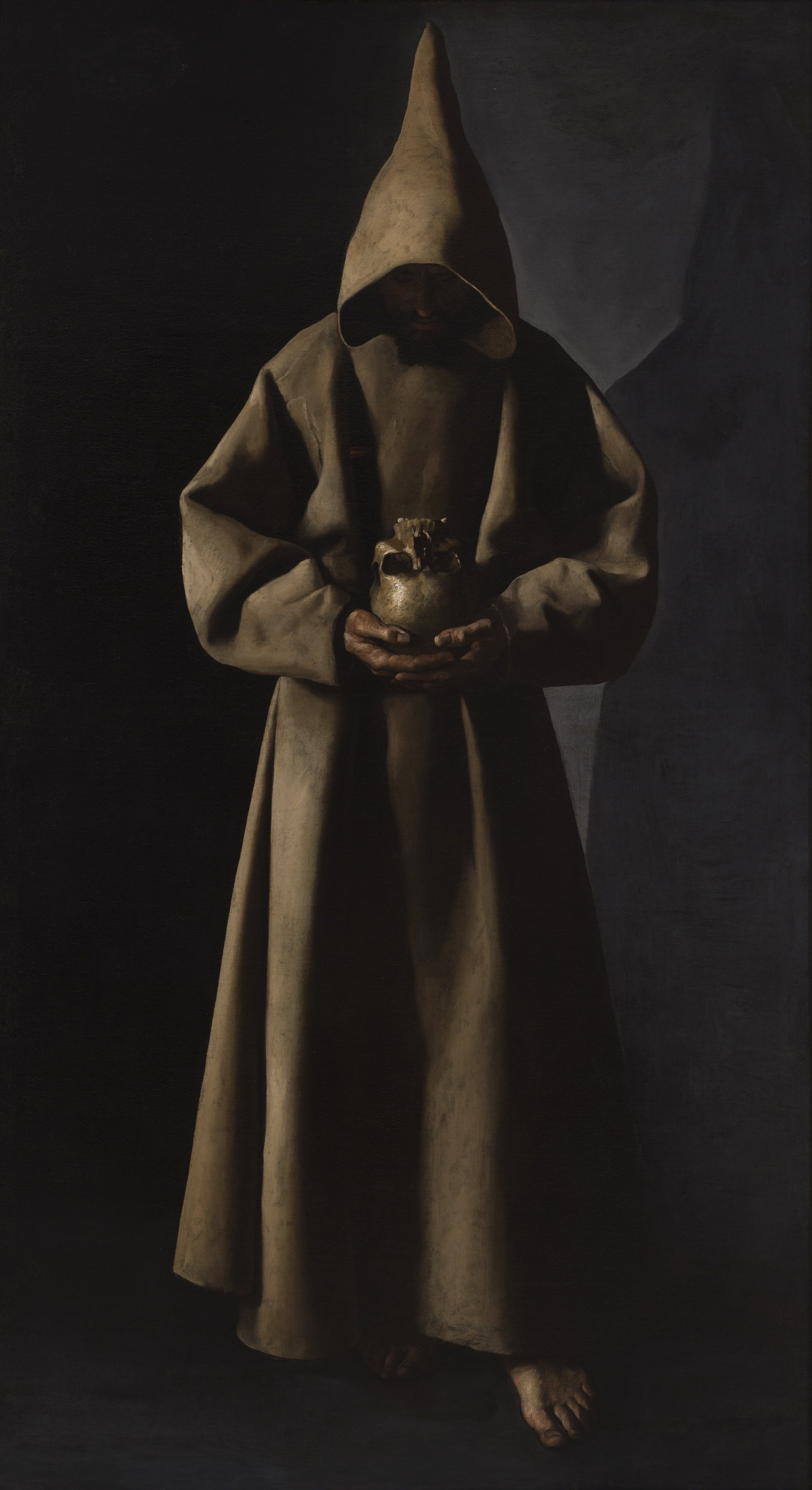
- Artist: Francisco de Zurbarán
- Year: 1630-34
- Medium: Oil on canvas
- Dimensions: 204.8 cm × 113.4 cm (80 5/8 in × 44 5/8 in)
- Location: Milwaukee Art Museum, Milwaukee

Saint Francis of Assisi in His Tomb is an oil-on-canvas painting by the Spanish Baroque artist Francisco de Zurbarán, created between 1630 and 1634. The work is part of the permanent collection of the Milwaukee Art Museum and is regarded as one of the most important examples of seventeenth-century Spanish art in an American collection.

== Description and origins ==
The painting depicts Saint Francis of Assisi standing in a dark space while contemplating a human skull. Zurbarán employs dramatic chiaroscuro, illuminating the saint’s coarse Franciscan habit, face, skull, and protruding foot against a nearly black background. The austere composition reflects the artist’s characteristic focus on spiritual contemplation and religious devotion, qualities that made his works especially valued in Counter-Reformation Spain.

The work is directly related to the legend of Pope Nicholas V's vision of Saint Francis. According to a tradition popular in the 17th century, as Pope Nicholas V visited Assisi in 1449 and the saint's tomb was opened, he saw the body of Francis miraculously preserved and standing upright in communion with God.

The painting was commissioned for Gaspar de Guzmán, Count-Duke of Olivares, the powerful minister and favorite of King Philip IV of Spain. Like many of Zurbarán’s religious works, it combines intense naturalism with a sense of mystical stillness, drawing inspiration from the painted wooden sculptures commonly found in Spanish churches.

Saint Francis was a particularly significant figure for monastic communities throughout the Iberian Peninsula. Zurbarán produced numerous images of the saint throughout his career, some of which are now in the Museum of Fine Arts of Lyon (Saint Francis), the Alte Pinakothek in Munich (Saint Francis in Ecstasy), the National Gallery in London (Saint Francis in Meditation), the Timken Museum of Art in San Diego, California (Saint Francis in Meditation), the Saint Louis Art Museum in St. Louis, Missouri (St. Francis Contemplating a Skull), and the Museu Nacional d'Art de Catalunya in Barcelona (Saint Francis of Assisi according to Pope Nicholas V's Vision).

== Posterity ==
Since entering the Milwaukee Art Museum's collection, Saint Francis of Assisi in His Tomb has become one of the institution's best-known European paintings. The work was acquired by the museum in 1958 from French-Mexican count and film producer Felipe Subervielle, known for working on productions directed by Emilio Fernández and starring actress Dolores del Río.

In 2024, British artist Idris Khan took inspiration from the painting for his first solo exhibition in the United States, organized by the museum.
