= Middle Coming =

Concept in Catholic mystical theology

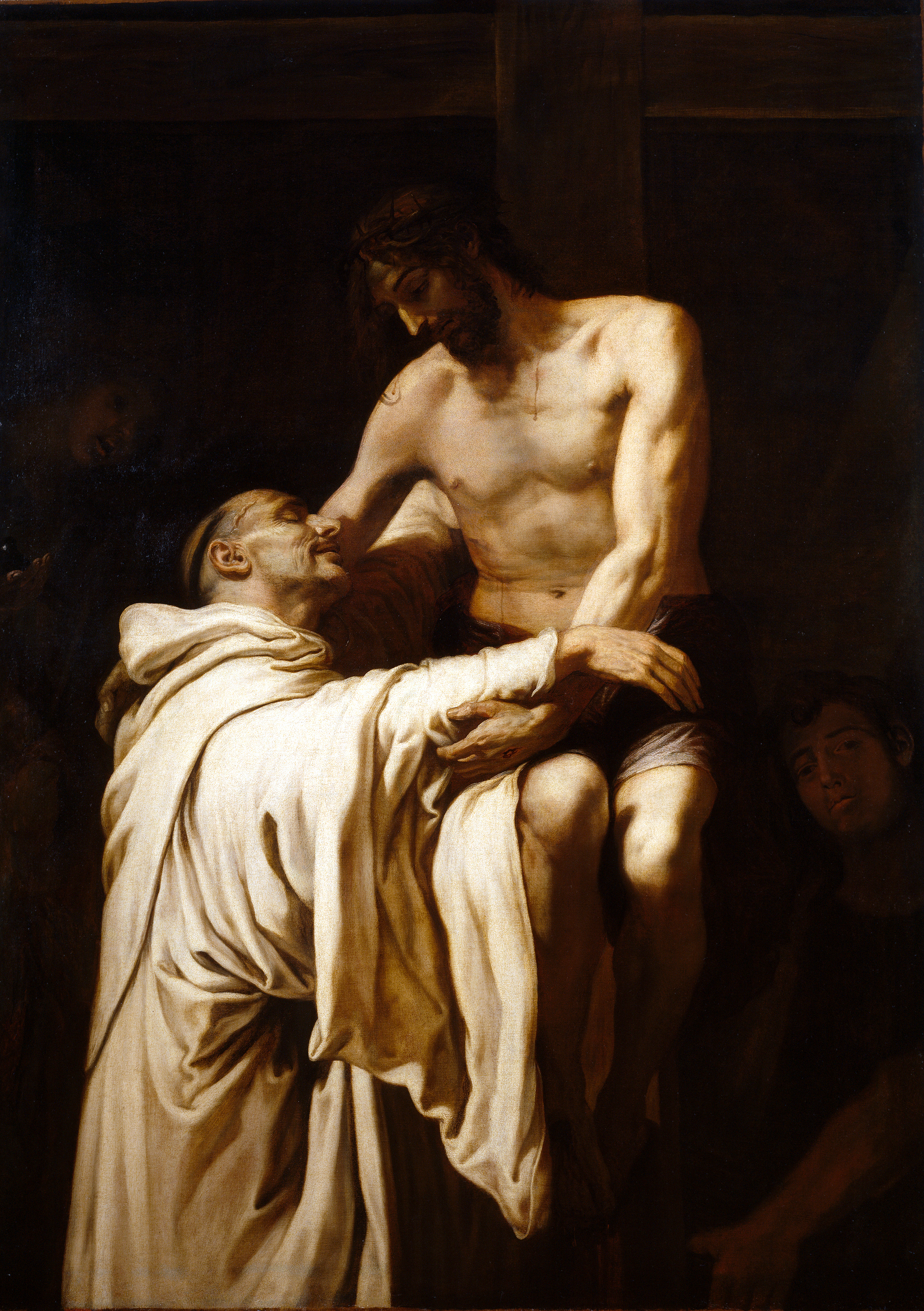
Christ embracing Saint Bernard, by Francesc Ribalta (1625-1627)

The Middle Coming (Latin: Adventus medius) is a concept in Christian theology introduced by Bernard of Clairvaux, based on John 14, which was further developed by Catholic theologians and especially commented on by Pope Benedict XVI. It refers to the coming of Jesus Christ between his incarnation (first coming) and his coming at the end of time (second coming). Interpretations of its meaning range from mystical encounter, God's effective presence in ordinary life, sacramental and biblical presence, and world transforming events through the great saints.

== Bernard of Clairvaux ==
The idea was coined in the monk's third sermon of Advent, in which Bernard elaborates on the "three Advents of the Lord", namely that "to men, in men and against men". In his fifth sermon, the author explicitly develops the Middle Coming concept.

Bernard also calls it the Third Coming, despite it being chronologically previous to the Second Coming. The mystic stresses that, despite the First and the Second Coming would be evident to all of mankind, most people remain "asleep" during the Third. The Middle Coming implies a "spiritual" awakening only perceived by the elect, in which Jesus interacts personally with the mystic in order to give him salvation, rest and consolation, and as a link between the First and the Last one.

Bernard presents the concept by arguing that

We know that the coming of the Lord is threefold…The first coming was in flesh and weakness, the middle coming is in spirit and power, and the final coming will be in glory and majesty.

And that

This middle coming is like a road that leads from the first coming to the last. At the first, Christ was our redemption; at the last, he will become manifest as our life; but in this middle way he is our rest and our consolation. If you think that I am inventing what I am saying about the middle coming, listen to the Lord himself: If anyone loves me, he will keep my words, and the Father will love him, and we shall come to him.

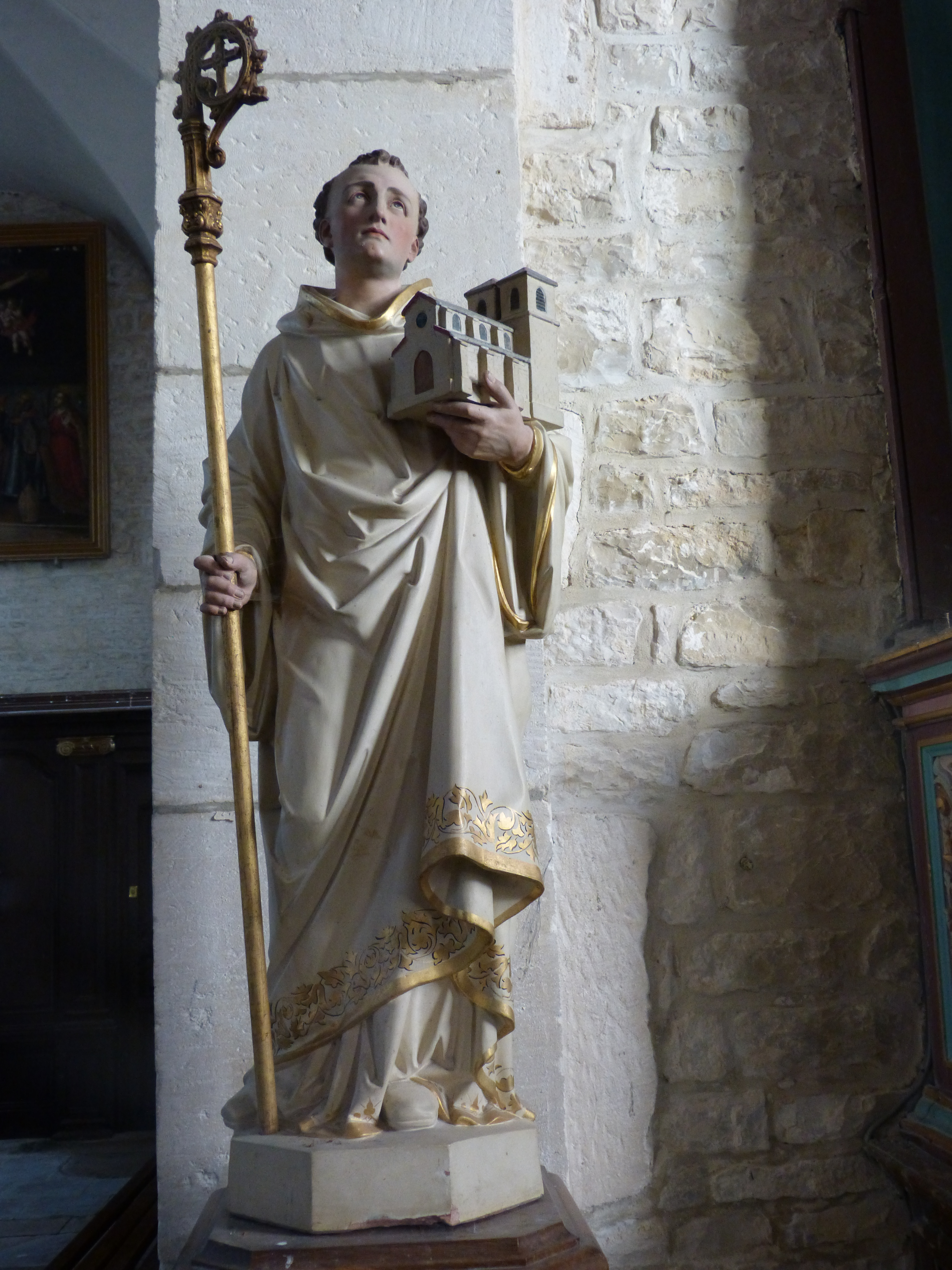
Statue of Bernard of Clairvaux at Aube, France.

== Further theological developnment ==
According to Pedro Gomez, an Argentinian theologian, who analyzed Bernard's writings, the Middle Coming refers to the interior and hidden experience of the mystic, and is not an end but a mean of preparation to the Second. The coming of God the Son to the human soul through the mystical experience has the transformation of the sinner's soul as a main goal, renewing the mystic's spirit and making it more in the image of God.

The Middle Coming is commonly associated with Catholic sacramental theology, particularly regarding the Baptism and the Eucharist.

In his book, Jesus of Nazareth, Benedict XVI developed the idea of adventus medius stating that it "takes place in a great variety of ways" as it prepares the world for the definitive coming. He says the Lord comes through his Word; the sacraments, especially the Eucharist; words or events that affect our lives; and through "ways that change the world." He referred to the ministry of great saints such as Francis, Dominic, Ignatius, Teresa of Avila, Francis Xavier, which "opened up new ways for the Lord to enter into the confused history of their century as it was pulling away from him." Through them, Jesus' mystery and power to transform humanity becomes present in a new way. He also said that not only we can, but we must pray "for anticipations of his world-changing presence," through the common biblical prayer, Maranatha, "Come, Lord Jesus!"

== Bibliography ==
- Gómez, Pedro Edmundo (2021). "Tres meditaciones sobre el "Adventus medius" de Bernardo de Claraval". Cuadernos monásticos (in Spanish) (216): 133–148. ISSN 0327-2141.
- Claudio Stercal, "Il «medius adventus» nei sermoni «In Adventu Domini» di Bernardo di Chiaravalle", «La Scuola Cattolica» 120 (1992), pp. 48-93.
- Claudio Stercal, "Il «medius adventus». Saggio di lettura degli scritti di Bernardo di Clairvaux" (Bibliotheca Cisterciensis 9), Roma, Editiones Cistercienses, 1992.
