= 1997 Rally El Corte Inglés =

1997 Rallye El Corte Inglés: 21. Rallye El Corte Inglés
Round 4 of the 1997 European Rally Championship
Round 1 of the 1997 Spanish Rally Championship
← Previous event	Next event →
- Host country: ESP
- Rally base: Maspalomas
- Dates run: 6 – 8 March 1997

Statistics
- Crews: 56 at start, 38 at finish

Overall results
- Overall winner: (Spain) Jesús Puras (Spain) Carlos Del Barrio; Citroën ZX Kit Car

The 1997 Rallye El Corte Inglés was the 21st Rally Islas Canarias/Rallye El Corte Inglés, a rally held as part of the European Rally Championship and the Spanish Rally Championship.

In 1997, Jesús Puras (Citroën ZX Kit Car) had his first of three wins in this event, finishing ahead of Bruno Thiry and Juha Kankkunen.

== Results ==
Pos	No.	Driver	Car	Time
1	3	(Spain) Jesús Puras	Citroën ZX Kit Car	3:30.28
2	2	(Belgium) Bruno Thiry	Ford Escort RS Cosworth	+1.00
3	1	(Finland) Juha Kankkunen	Toyota Celica GT-Four	+2.46
4	9	(Spain) José María Ponce	Toyota Celica GT-Four	+2.51
5	10	(Spain) Miguel Martinez-Conde	Renault Mégane Maxi	+4.46
6	5	(Poland) Krzysztof Hołowczyc	Subaru Impreza 555	+6.07
7	11	(Spain) Daniel Alonso Villarón	Ford Escort Kit Car	+6.55
8	14	(Spain) Gregorio Picar	Ford Escort RS Cosworth	+10.31
9	6	(Netherlands) Bert de Jong	Ford Escort RS Cosworth	+14.22
10	18	(Spain) Flavio Alonso	Ford Escort RS Cosworth	+16.54
11	31	(Spain) Lorenzo Raya	Peugeot 306 Maxi	+17.34
12	22	(Norway) Bruno Arntsen	Opel Astra GSi 16V	+19.25
13	25	(Spain) Manuel Mesa	Citroën ZX 16S	+19.29
14	20	(Italy) Sergio Trevisan	Ford Escort RS Cosworth	+20.56
15	16	(Spain) Miguel Fuster	Peugeot 106 Kit Car	+22.48
16	32	(Spain) José Manuel Herrera Quevedo	Renault Clio Williams	+31.13
17	35	(Italy) Elisabetta Cavenaghi	Nissan Sunny GTi	+32.37
18	36	(Spain) Ignacio Sanfilippo	Peugeot 106 Rallye	+33.50
19	37	(Spain) Leonardo Sabán	Peugeot 106 Rallye	+34.34
20	44	(Spain) Ántimo Valiente	Renault Clio Williams	+35.02
21	38	(Spain) Amador Vidal	Peugeot 106 Rallye	+35.23
22	53	(Spain) Jordi Griñó	Peugeot 106 Rallye	+36.09
23	40	(Spain) Raúl Santana	Peugeot 106 Rallye	+37.59
27	63	(Italy) Valter Ballestrero	Fiat Cinquecento Sporting	+44.05
28	39	(Spain) Tomás González	Peugeot 106 Rallye	+44.28
29	28	(France) Christian Colle	Ford Escort RS Cosworth	+47.01
32	66	(Belgium) Larry Cols	Fiat Cinquecento Sporting	+51.12
34	64	(Austria) Waldemar Benedict	Fiat Cinquecento Sporting	+56.39
Ret	7	(United Kingdom) Gwyndaf Evans	Ford Escort Kit Car	Engine
Ret	8	(Spain) Jaime Azcona	Peugeot 306 Maxi	Engine
Ret	12	(Spain) Luis Monzón	Ford Escort RS Cosworth	Accident
Ret	15	(Spain) Antonio Ponce	Subaru Impreza 555	Turbo
Ret	17	(Italy) Gigi Galli	Ford Escort RS Cosworth	Retired
Ret	19	(Germany) Helmut Fortkort	Ford Escort RS Cosworth	Retired
Ret	21	(Peru) Ramón Ferreyros	Peugeot 106 Kit Car	Retired
Ret	23	(Italy) Pierfranco Uzzeni	Subaru Impreza 555	Didn't start
Ret	24	(Spain) Sergio Vallejo	Citroën ZX 16V	Retired
Ret	26	(Spain) Carlos Padilla	Renault Clio Williams	Retired
Ret	27	(France) Carmelo Britti	Renault Clio Williams	Retired
Ret	29	(Spain) José Luis "El Puma" Rodríguez	Ford Escort RS Cosworth	Retired
Ret	30	(Spain) Santiago Concepción	Ford Escort RS Cosworth	Retired
Ret	41	(Spain) Pedro Moreno García	Renault Clio Williams	Retired
Ret	42	(Spain) Ángel Eugenio Camacho	Ford Escort RS Cosworth	Engine
Ret	43	(Spain) David García Mastaglio	Citroën ZX 16S	Retired
Ret	47	(Spain) Manuel Díaz	Nissan Pulsar GTi-R	Accident
Ret	65	(Germany) Karl-Heinz Kling	Fiat Cinquecento Sporting	Retired
Ret	67	(Netherlands) Arnold van der Smeede	Fiat Cinquecento Sporting	Retired
Ret	68	(France) Cédric Robert	Fiat Cinquecento Sporting	Retired
-	4	(Spain) Luis Climent	Ford Escort Kit Car	
-	34	(Spain) Teófilo Vera	Ford Escort RS Cosworth	
