= Salvator Rosa (frame) =

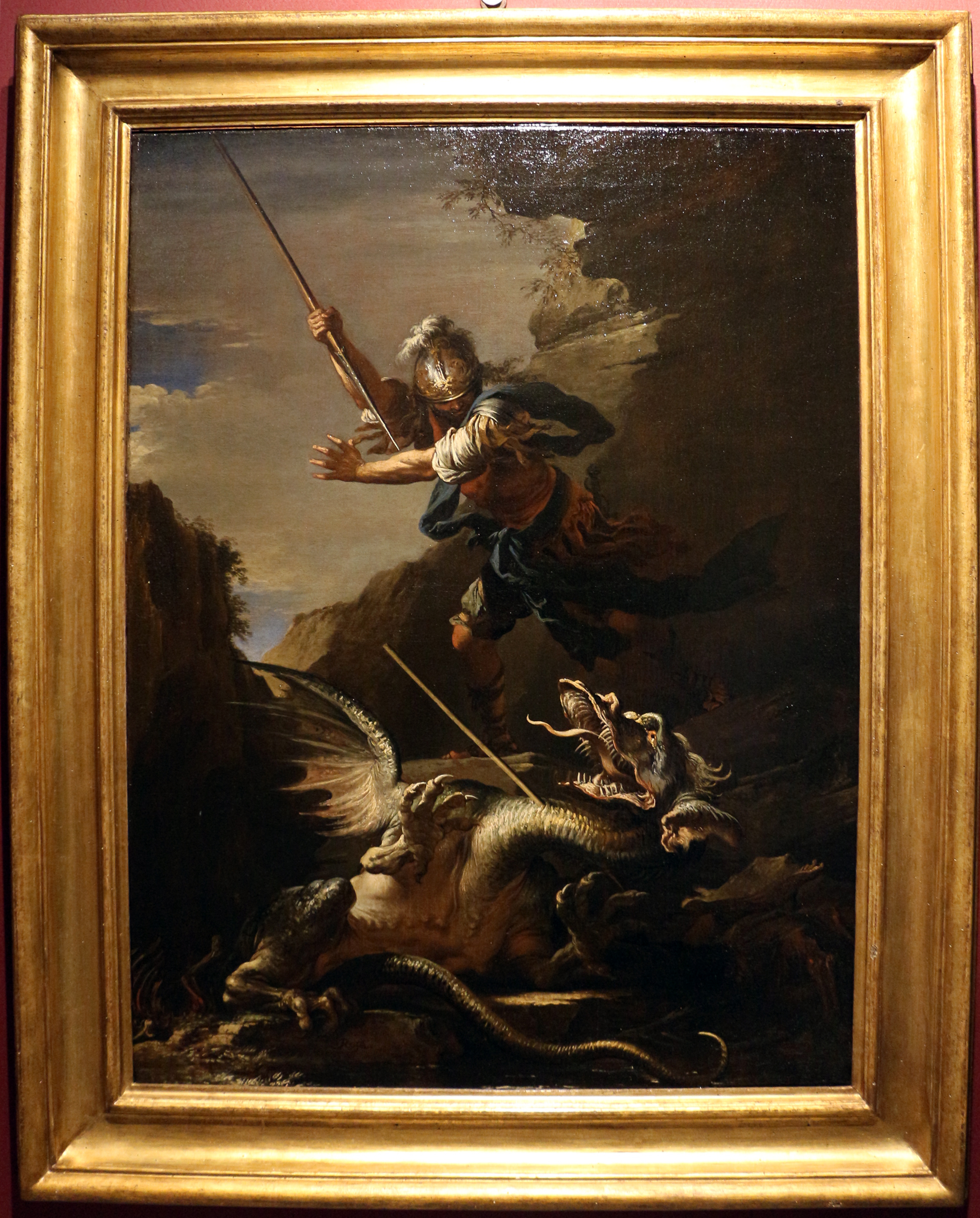
Salvator Rosa, Saint George kills the dragon, Florenze, private collection. The frame used for this painting is the salvadora typology.

The Salvator Rosa frame, also called salvadora or salvatora, is a typology of frame used for artworks, one of the best known framing-style from Italy. Originated during the 17th century, it takes the name of the artist that started using it. Designed to fit paintings of various sizes and hanging methods, Rosa was strongly convinced that the aesthetic reception, and thus monetary value, of a painting was given also with its own frame. The salvadora was then adopted by many other late-baroque artists, in particular by Carlo Maratta who used it in so many occasions that, for a brief period in the 18th century, the framing. Style adopted also his name. It sostituited the Sansovino frame, popular during the Italian renaissance, and continued to be popular until the nineteenth-century.

Its use outside Italy started during the Grand Tour, used particularly for paintings purchased by British visitors, many of those created before the historical period in which Rosa lived.

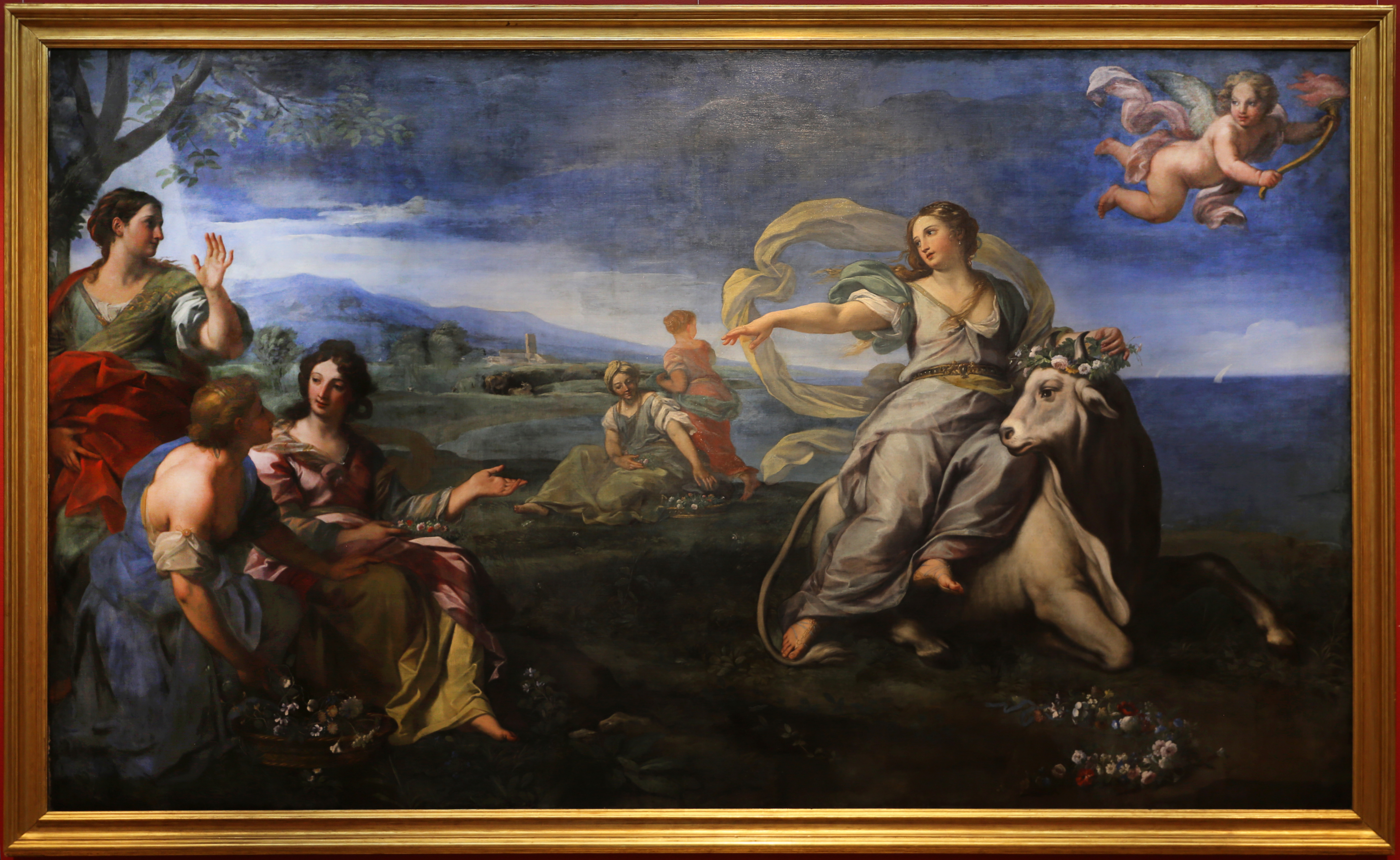
Carlo Maratta, The abduction of Europa, 1680-85 ca, National Gallery of Ireland. The frame used for this painting is another case of Salvator Rosa style.

This frame is composed by a simple wooden frame gilded with a gold leaf, or like in other cases, a silver leaf painted with warm-colored varnish to imitate golden shadow, and a single intaglio line. Is Filippo Baldinucci the first that cites the attention which Salvator Rosa gave to the conservation of his works, but the one that prove the framing-style invention to its namesake is Bernardo De Dominici. Neither Baldinucci nor De Dominici explain the exact reasons that pushed Rosa to create the frame, but in a letter to his friend Giovan Battista Ricciardi the neapolitan artist underscored the importance of a simple yet dignified frame to isolate the artwork for the external context, as opposite to the Spanish framing-style popular those years in his native city.
