= Vicente Castelló =

Spanish painter (1585–1636)

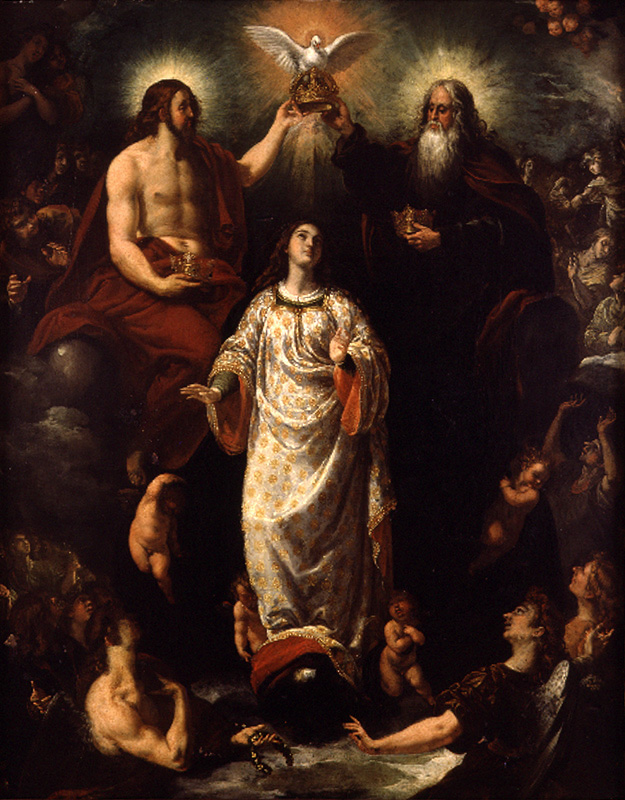
The Coronation of the Virgin, Museo de Bellas Artes de Valencia

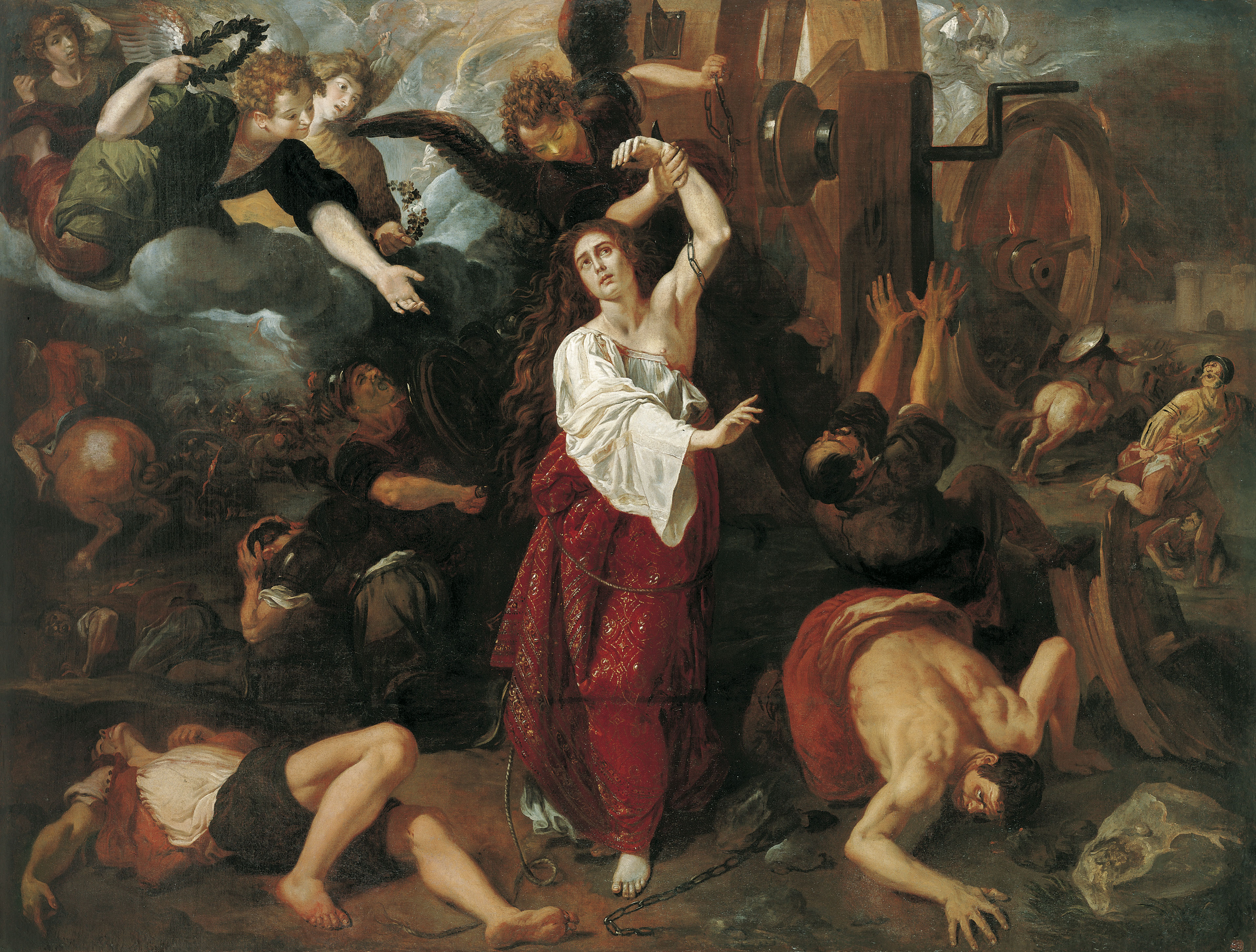
The Martyrdom of Saint Catherine of Alexandria, Museo de Bellas Artes de Bilbao

Vicente Castelló (c. 1585, Valencia – 1636, Valencia) was a Spanish painter in the Baroque style. He was a son-in-law of Francisco Ribalta, whose painting style was similar; as was that of his brother-in-law, Juan Ribalta, leading to a misattribution of many of his paintings. He was virtually forgotten until these errors were corrected.

== Biography ==
His father, Salvador, was a painter from Aragón who came to Valencia just before Vicente's birth. His mother, Jerónima Comes, was the daughter of Jerónimo Comes, also a painter. It is likely that his father worked, at least temporarily, for Francisco Ribalta.

In 1616, he was inscribed on the list of the College of Painters. After 1620, he worked in Segorbe, together with Juan Ribalta and Abdón Castañeda. The three also created an altarpiece in Andilla, completed in 1626, and painted two images (now lost) for the chapel of the Communion at the Segorbe Cathedral. The Apotheosis of San Bruno at the Cartuja de Vall de Cristo (now at the Museo de Bellas Artes de Castellón), was originally attributed to Francisco Ribalta; although it now appears to have been done by Castelló. He is also credited with completing the Virgin of Porta-Coeli at the Porta Coeli Charterhouse (now at the Museo de Bellas Artes de Valencia), which was begun by the elder Ribalta in 1625.

Both of the Ribaltas died in 1628, and Castelló took over the family workshop. In 1630, he was back in Segorbe, where he engaged in a challenge, from Pedro García Ferrer, to create a painting on the theme Story of the Innocents, entirely of their own invention; nothing copied from other sources. The loser would forfeit fifty Libras (Pounds).

The last reference to Castelló is in 1635, from the papers of the Bishop of Segorbe, Pedro Ginés de Casanova, regarding a commission for a painting of The Last Supper.

Castelló's works may be distinguished by exaggerated foreshortenings with longer figures. His brushstrokes also lacked the precision of the Ribaltas' and he used darker colors for backgrounds. These features have helped to separate his works from theirs as well as some works formerly attributed to Pedro de Orrente.

== Sources ==
- Benito Doménech, Fernando (1987), Los Ribalta y la pintura valenciana de su tiempo, catálogo de la exposición, Valencia-Madrid, ISBN 978-84-505-6705-2
- Cinco siglos de pintura valenciana. Obras del Museo de Bellas Artes de Valencia (1996), Museo de Bellas Artes-Fundación Central Hispano ISBN 84-920722-6-1
- Kowal, David M., Ribalta y los ribaltescos: la evolución del estilo barroco en Valencia (1985), Diputación Provincial de Valencia ISBN 84-505-1981-0
- Pérez Sánchez, Alfonso E., Pintura barroca en España 1600-1750 (1992), Ediciones Cátedra S.A. ISBN 84-376-0994-1
