= Christ Embracing Saint Bernard =

Painting by Francesc Ribalta

Christ embracing Saint Bernard
- Cristo abrazando a San Bernardo (Spanish)
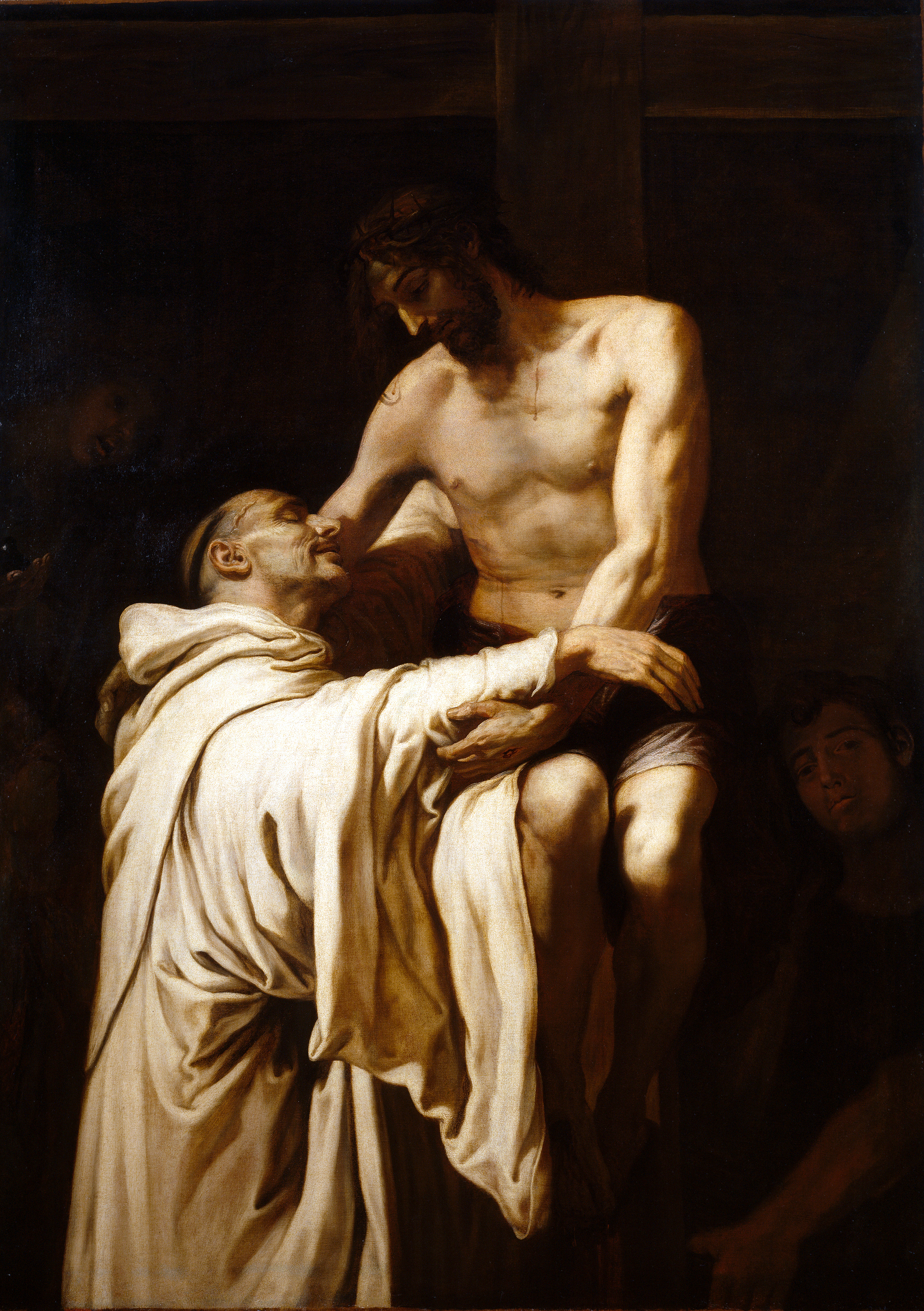
- Artist: Francesc Ribalta
- Year: 1625–1627
- Medium: Oil on canvas
- Movement: Spanish Baroque
- Dimensions: 158 cm × 113 cm (62 in × 44 in)
- Location: Museo del Prado
- Accession: P002804

Christ embracing Saint Bernard is an oil on canvas painting by Spanish artist Francesc Ribalta, created between 1625 and 1627, now held in the Museo del Prado of Madrid. It has been described as "“one of the most famous examples of Spanish naturalism and one of the greatest expressions of contemporary mysticism".

== History ==
It is considered one of the best late compositions of Ribalta. The figure of Christ is modeled after Sebastiano del Piombo's Lamentation over the dead Christ, a painting of which Ribalta had produced two copies. The picture belonged to the Colección Caberas up to 1920, after what it became property of Luis Escobar y Muñoz. The museum bought it to his heirs in 1940.

Trace of the picture was lost after the 18th century. The monks sold it to a particular collection, and was probably property of the Marquis of Ráfol by 1831. After the monastery's artworks were expropriated by the Spanish confiscation in 1839, the state inventory does not mention the work. When El Prado bought the painting, it was initially attributed to Francisco de Zurbarán.

The artwork was created at Valencia, by commission of the Carthusians of Porta-Coeli. Ribalta's son, Juan, collaborated in its composition. Both would die soon after its completion.

It was Ribalta's last work.

== Content ==
The artwork is clearly tenebrist and was possibly inspired in Pedro Orrente's El Martirio de San Sebastián. The picture is organized around a diagonal, a typical structure in baroque paintings.

The painting depicts Catholic ascete Bernard of Clairvaux during one of his mystical visions, in which, while praying before a crucifix, the image allegedly came to life and embraced him. The scene is described in the Flos Sanctorum by Pedro de Ribadeneira.

The picture shows Bernard kneeling in ecstasy, smiling and with his eyes closed, supported by the image of Christ as if hanging from it. Bernard is depicted wearing a cistercian choir dress with elaborate folds, what contrasts with the bare flesh of the crucified. The blood vessel that can be seen on the saint's temple and the sheen of sweat over his skin create the image of an intense religious ecstasy. The saint is characterized as rather old, while Christ is depicted in a strong and muscular image. His shoulder wound can be seen, what has been pointed as possibly related to another vision in which the saint was revealed that such was the most painful injury experienced during the Passion of Jesus.

== See also ==
- Caravaggisti
- Lactatio Bernardi
