= Francisco Herrera the Elder =

17th-century Spanish painter

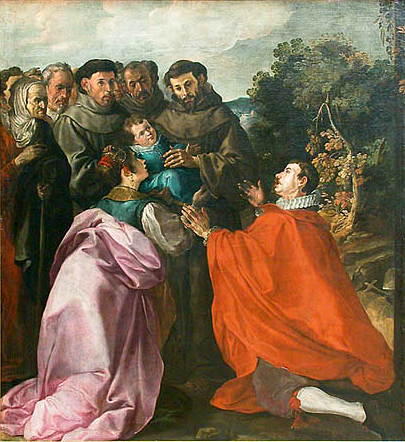
La curación de San Buenaventura niño por San Francisco (1628).

Francisco Herrera (c. 1590 – 1656) was a Spanish painter, born in Seville. He was the founder of the Seville school. He is known as El viejo, "the elder," to distinguish him from his son Francisco Herrera the Younger, also a noted painter.

== Biography ==
Francisco Herrera was born in Seville around 1590, and studied painting under Francisco Pacheco.

His talent brought him many pupils, including Ignacio de Iriarte and a thirteen-year-old Diego Velázquez, and he stood godfather to the Spanish-born Portuguese painter Josefa de Óbidos. Herrera's temper, however, drove many of his students away; Velázquez left after a year. Two of Herrera's three children also became alienated from him, his son Francisco ("el Mozo") leaving for Rome, and his daughter entering a nunnery. His other son, "el Rubio" (the ruddy), died young.

Herrera, who was an accomplished worker in bronze, engraved medals skilfully. This gave rise to the charge of counterfeiting, and he fled for sanctuary to the Jesuit College, for which he painted "The Triumph of St. Hermengild", a picture so impressive that when Philip IV saw it (1621) he immediately pardoned the painter. Herrera thereupon returned to Seville.

After executing many commissions in his native town he removed to Madrid (1650).

== Works ==
Herrera broke away from the timid style and Italian traditions of Spanish painting of his day, and became the pioneer of that bold, vigorous, effective, and natural style whose preeminent exponent was Velázquez. Herrera was the first to use long brushes, which may, in part, account for his "modern" technique and dexterous brushwork.

Herrera's pictures are full of energy, the drawing is good and the colouring so cleverly managed that the figures stand out in splendid relief. Many of his small easel pictures, in oil, represent fairs, dances, interiors of inns, and deal with the intimate life of Spain. His large works are nearly all religious. In Seville he painted a "St. Peter" for the cathedral and a "Last Judgment" for the Church of San Bernardo, the latter being considered his masterpiece.

In the archiepiscopal palace of Madrid are four large canvases, one of which, "Moses Smiting the Rock", is celebrated for its dramatic qualities and daring technique. In the cloister of the Merced Calzada is a noteworthy series of paintings whose subjects are drawn from the life of St. Ramon. He painted much in fresco, in which medium his best effort is believed to have been on the vault of San Bonaventura, but this, with all his other frescoes, has disappeared. None of his architectural productions are mentioned, and there remain but a few of his etchings, all of which were reproductions of his paintings. One of his pictures, "St. Basil dictating his doctrine", is in the Louvre, and another, "St. Matthew", is in the Dresden Gallery.

Herrera's finest paintings include "The Last Judgment" and a "Holy Family," both in churches at Seville. Others are in the Louvre, Paris. They exhibit boldness of execution with faultless technique.

Among his other works are:

- San Diego (Saint James) (1637), Madrid, private collection
- Bebedor (1626), Worcester Art Museum
- Job (1636), 215 x 151 cm., Musée des Beaux-Arts de Rouen.
- La Parentela de Jesús, Museum of Fine Arts in Bilbao
- San Basilio dictando su doctrina (1639), 243 x 194 cm, Louvre
- Milagro del Pan y de los Peces (1647), Archbishop's Palace, Madrid
- Ciego tocando la zampoña (1650), Kunsthistorische Museum, Vienna
