= Spanish Baroque painting =

Style of painting

Diego Velázquez: Las Meninas or La familia de Felipe IV, 1656, oil on canvas, 310 × 276 cm, Museo del Prado, Madrid.

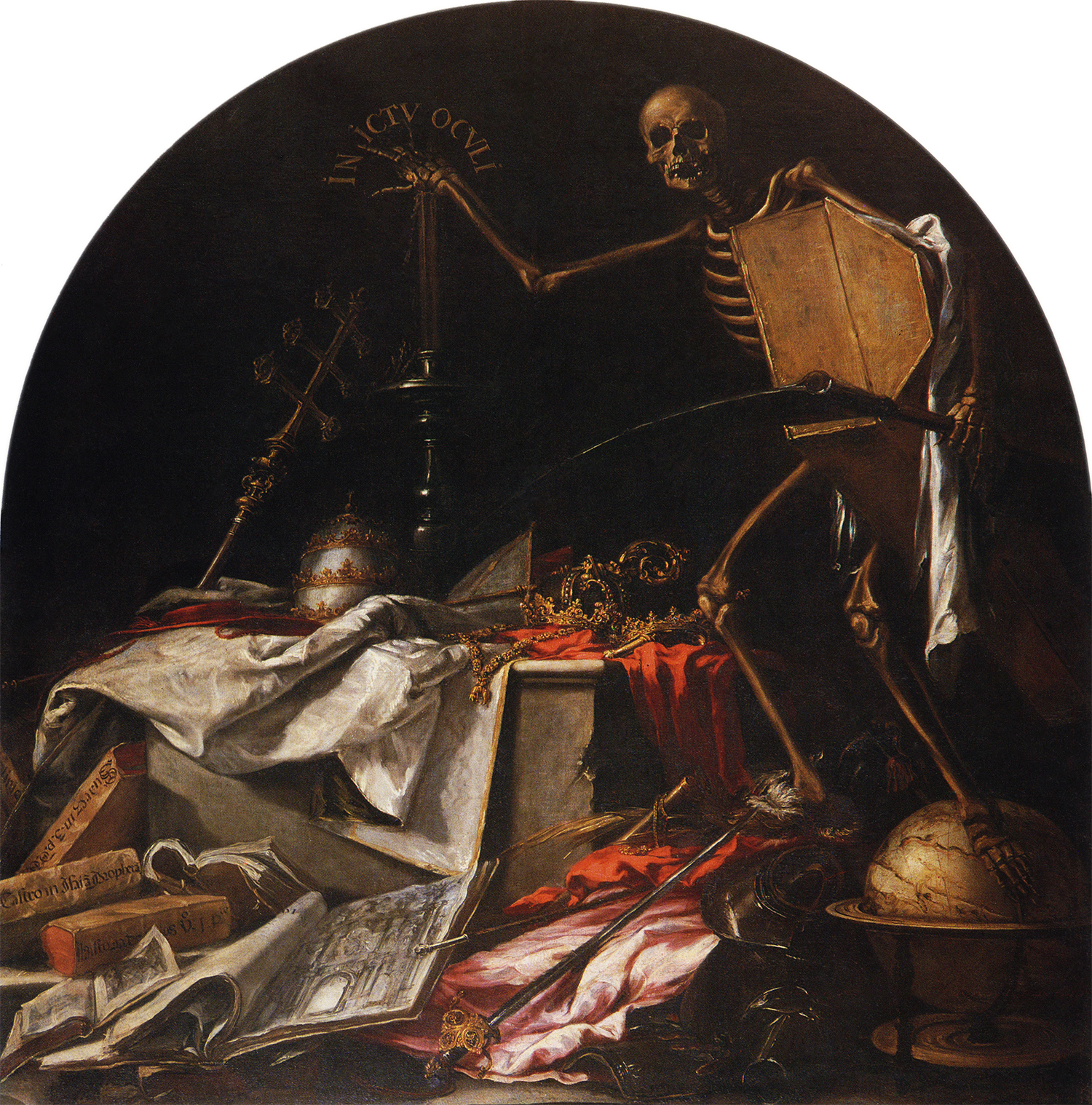
Juan de Valdés Leal: In ictu oculi, one of the Four last things of Man, 1672, oil on canvas, 220 × 216 cm, Hospital de la Caridad, Seville.

Spanish Baroque painting refers to the style of painting which developed in Spain throughout the 17th century and the first half of the 18th century. The style appeared in early 17th century paintings, and arose in response to Mannerist distortions and idealisation of beauty in excess, appearing in early 17th century paintings. Its main objective was, above all, to allow the viewer to easily understand the scenes depicted in the works through the use of realism, while also meeting the Catholic Church's demands for 'decorum' during the Counter-Reformation.

The naturalism typical of the Caravaggisti in Italy, and the dramatic illumination of Tenebrism that was introduced in Spain after 1610, would go on to shape the dominant style of painting in Spain in the first half of the 17th century. The style was later influenced by Flemish Baroque painting, as the Spanish Habsburgs ruled over an area of the Netherlands during this period. The arrival of Flemish painter Peter Paul Rubens in Spain, who visited the country in 1603 and 1628, also had some influence Spanish painting. However, it was the profusion of his works, as well as those of his students, which would go on to have an even greater impact from 1638 onward. Ruben's influence was later combined with the technique used by Titian, which incorporated loose brushstrokes and broken contours; the fusion of these influences was key to the creation of the works of Diego Velázquez, the most prestigious artist of the period.

The combination of Flemish influences, the new artistic trends from Italy, the arrival of the fresco painters Agostino Mitelli and Angelo Michele Colonna in 1658, as well as the arrival of Luca Giordano in 1692, would lead to the zenith of the Baroque period, characterised by its dynamism and innovation, in the second half of the 17th century. Despite the fact that Spain was hit especially hard by the General Crisis, this period is known as the Golden Age of Spanish Painting, because of the great quantity, quality, and originality of the world class artists that arose during the time.

== Characteristics ==
=== Patrons and commissioners ===
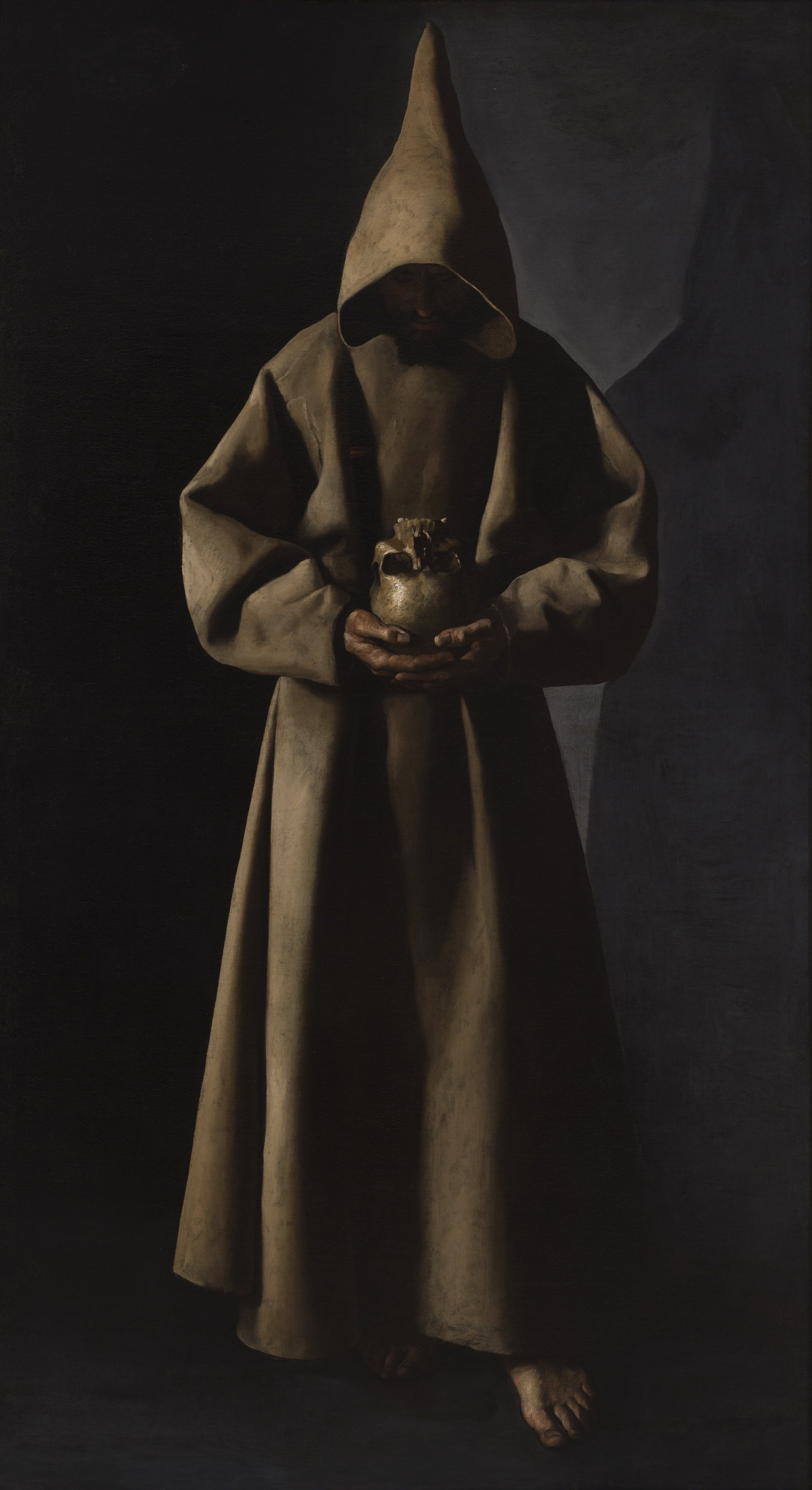
Francisco de Zurbarán: Saint Francis of Assisi in His Tomb, 1630–34, oil on canvas, 80 × 44 cm, Milwaukee Art Museum.

The artists' principal clientele consisted of the Catholic Church and institutions linked to it (confraternities and brotherhoods), as well as those who commissioned paintings for their chapels and foundations. Religious paintings held great importance, as they were commissioned by the Catholic Church to be used during the Counter-Reformation. Painters employed by the Church had to abide by the limitations and supervision of the Church rectors, who determined both the subject of the paintings and the way in which the subject would be portrayed: contracts would frequently state which models the painter had to follow, and final approval of the paintings had to be given by the prior. On the other hand, working for the Church would not only provide painters with a considerable source of income, but also the opportunity to gain social prestige, as it allowed them to exhibit their work in public.

The Royal Court also commissioned paintings, with Philip IV of Spain in particular providing a 'true patronage' for painters. In a letter to a friend sent from Madrid in 1628, Rubens stated: "Here I devote my time to painting, as I have done in other places, and I have already completed an equestrian portrait of His Majesty, which he was very pleased with. It's true that he is extremely captivated by painting, and I believe he has been gifted with some exceptional qualities. We have become close: as I'm staying at the palace, he comes to visit me every day."

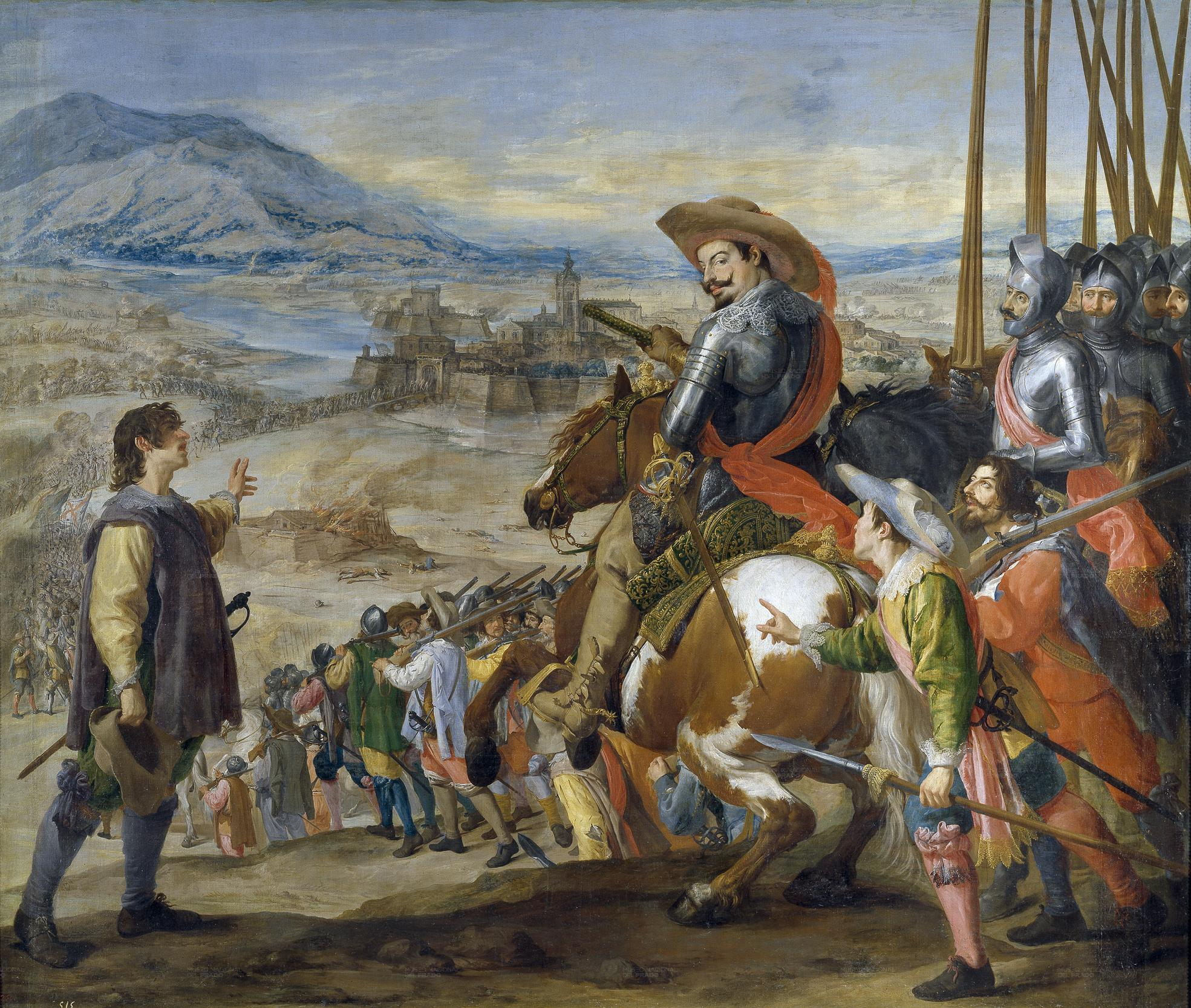
Jusepe Leonardo painted Taking of Breisach for the Hall of Realms; 1635, oil on canvas, 305 × 333 cm, Museo del Prado

The urgent need to decorate the newly constructed Buen Retiro Palace gave rise to important commissions. Spanish painters were entrusted with the decoration of the Hall of Realms: Velázquez's equestrian portraits, a series of paintings of Military art, with the recent victories of Philip IV's armies, and Francisco de Zurbarán's series depicting the Labours of Hercules were among the works contributed. Foreign artists operating in Rome, such as Claudio de Lorena and Nicolas Poussin, were commissioned to produce two series of paintings for the Gallery of Landscapes. Painters working in Naples, such as Giovanni Lanfranco, and Domenichino, were commissioned to create more than thirty paintings depicting Rome's history, a collection to which the painting Women Gladiators by José de Ribera belongs.

As it was prohibited for paintings to be moved between royal palaces, and given Olivares' haste to finish the decor of the Retiro Palace, numerous works were purchased from private collectors, until the number of paintings hanging on the palace walls totalled around 800. Velázquez was amongst these art vendors: in 1634, he sold the King the paintings Joseph's Tunic and Apollo in the Forge of Vulcan, which he had painted in Italy, along with the works of others, including, four landscapes, two still lifes, two flower paintings, and a copy of Titian's Danae.

=== Social prestige ===
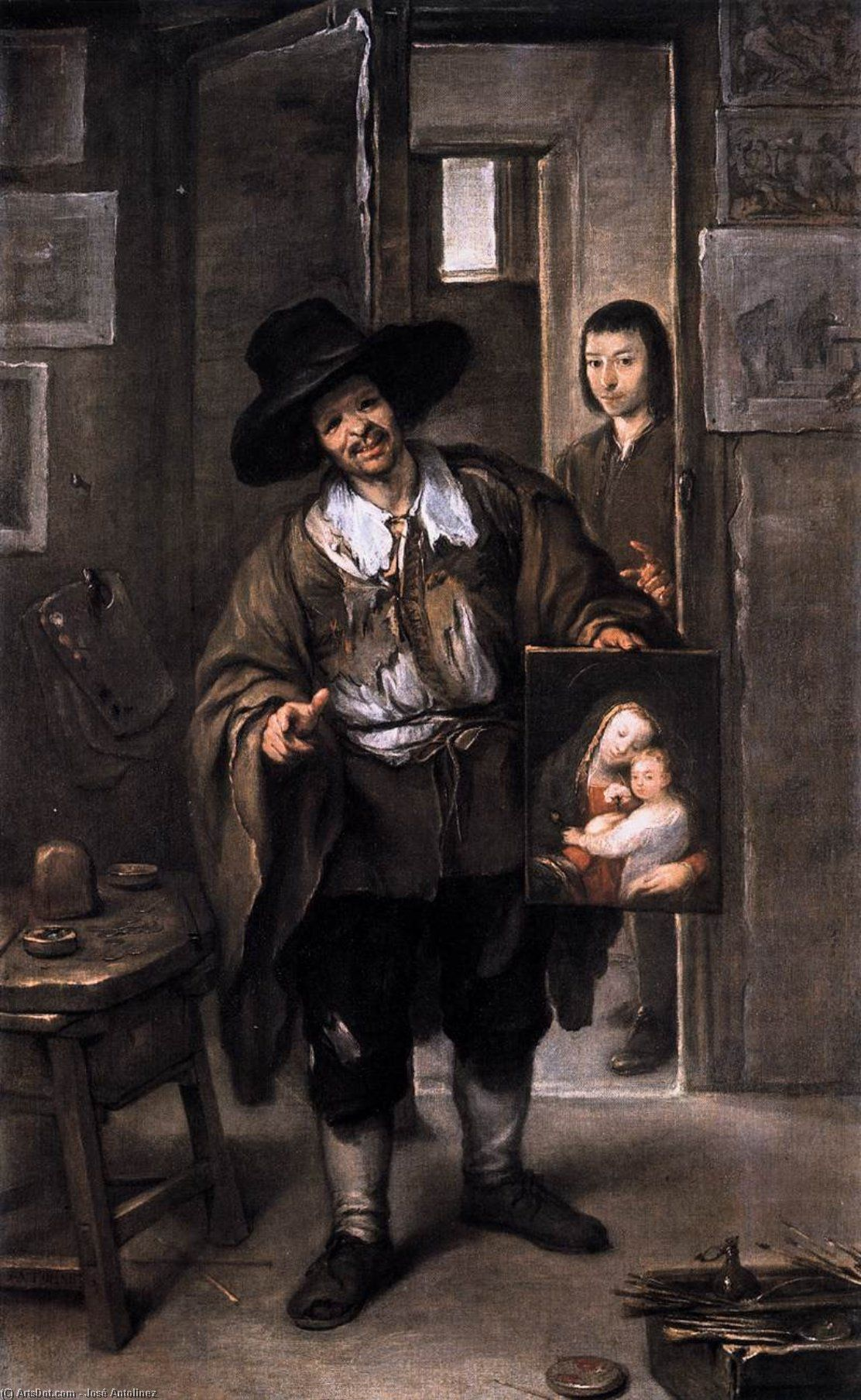
José Antolínez: The Picture Seller, c. 1670, oil on canvas, 201 × 125 cm, Alte Pinakothek.

While prestigious artists were commissioned by the Church or the court, a great number of lesser artists made a living producing different types of painting, which they would sell in shops or on the street. Painting was considered a position of manual labour, and was therefore subject to the low pay and lack of social recognition typically afforded to lesser, menial roles. These depreciative views and prejudgements would only be overcome in the 18th century. Throughout the 17th century, painters fought for their trade to be recognised as a liberal art. The efforts by Velázquez to be admitted in the Order of Santiago, were also in pursuit of this societal recognition. Many studies on art theory from this period not only provided biographical information about the artists, but also represented an effort to bring more dignity to the profession.

== Themes ==
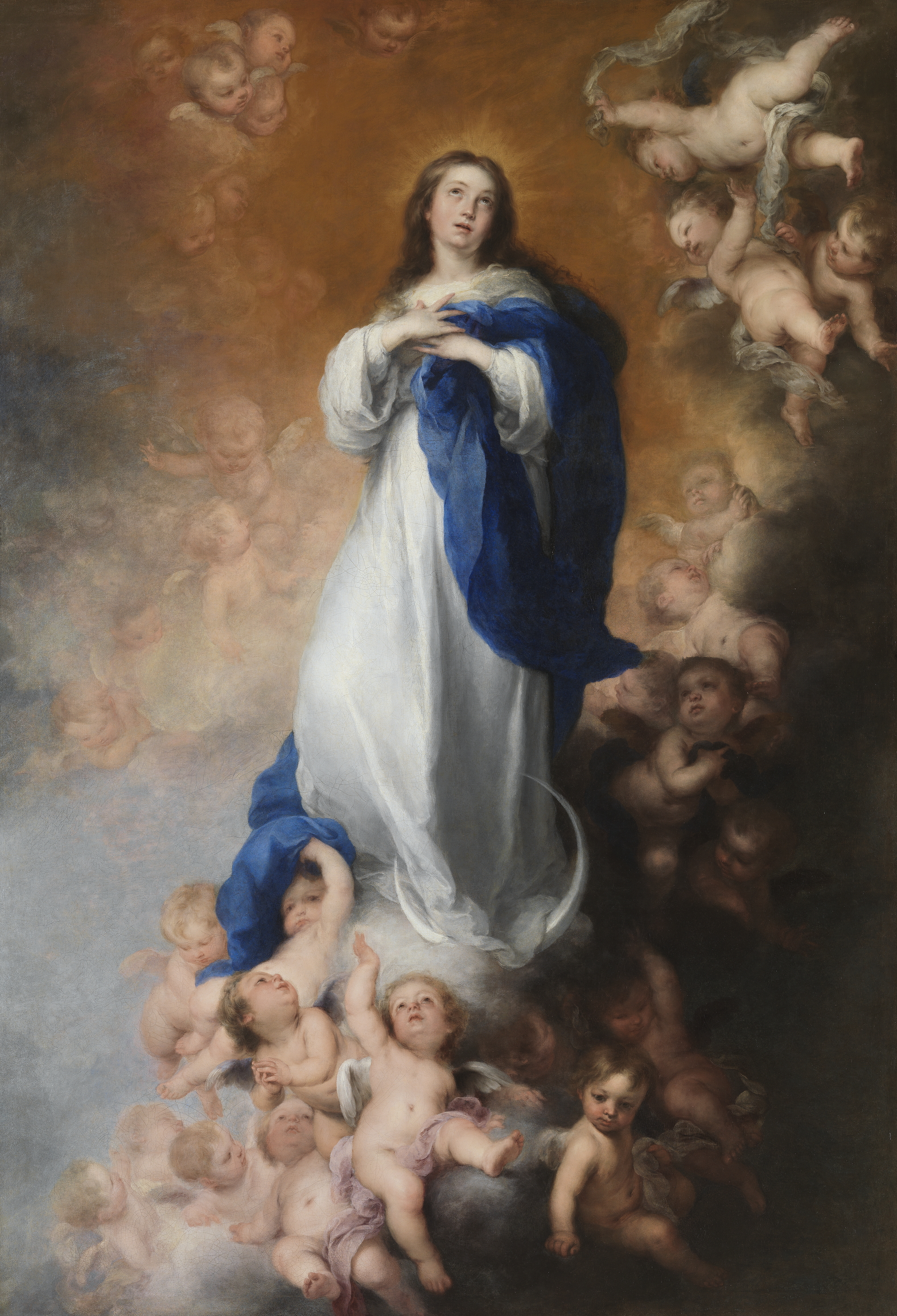
The Immaculate Conception of Los Venerables by Bartolomé Esteban Murillo; 1678, oil on canvas, 274 cm × 190 cm, Museo del Prado.

=== Religious painting ===
Francisco Pacheco, the Spanish Baroque painter under whom Velázquez studied, believed that the ultimate goal of painting was to inspire religious devotion within the viewer, bringing them closer to God. This outlook illustrates the reasons for the implementation of realism in religious painting in the first half of the 16th century, and for the swift acceptance of naturalist trends, as these were thought to aid religious believers to engage with the religious events depicted.

With the rise of Protestantism and their increasing reluctance to worship certain religious symbols associated with Catholicism, the Church further encouraged depictions of the veneration of the Virgin Mary, as well as Saint Joseph (encouraged by Teresa of Ávila), The Immaculate Conception is a religious motif characteristic of Spain which frequently appears in paintings, with the country, led by the monarchy, determined in defending this doctrine, which still hadn't been established by the Pope. For similar reasons, depictions of the Holy Communion, and Eucharistic subjects gained increasing importance (exemplified in Claudio Coello's Adoración de la Sagrada Forma in El Escorial).

Depictions of Evangelical themes were extremely common, and were also often used to combat Protestant heresy: the Last Supper reflects the Eucharistic consecration; Christ's miracles make reference to the works of compassion (such as the series of paintings by Murillo for the Hospital de la Caridad in Seville). On the other hand, given the reservations Catholics had towards the Old Testament, there were very few which depicted scenes from it; the subjects chosen were those which could be interpreted as the announcement of the Birth of Christ, or which are parallels of it (such as the Binding of Isaac, the meaning of which corresponds with the passion of Christ).

=== Secular themes ===
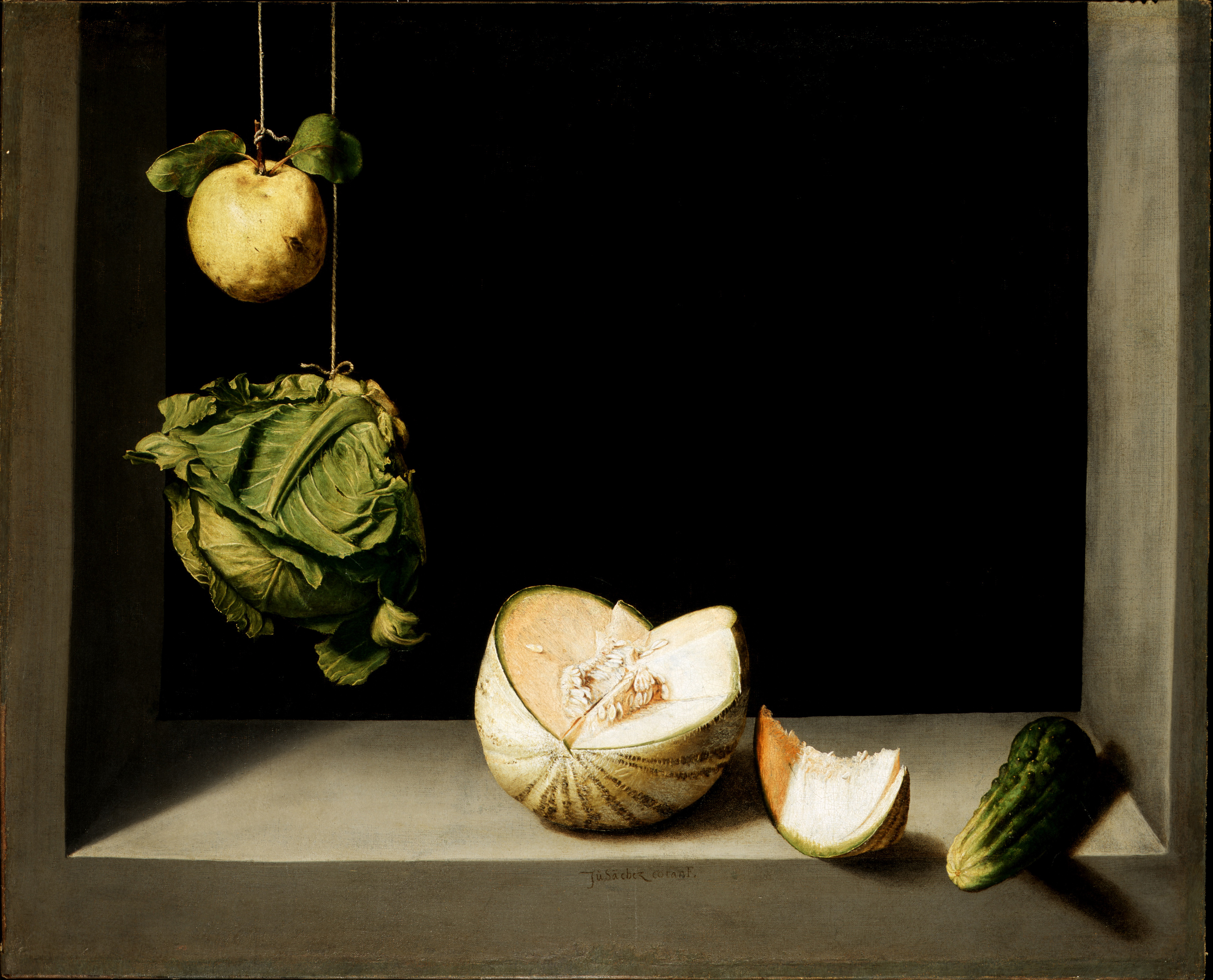
Still Life with Quince, Cabbage, Melon, and Cucumber: Juan Sánchez Cotán inspired the austeric style of Spanish still lifes; 1602, oil on canvas, 69 × 84 cm, San Diego Museum of Art.

Other themes, such as still life and portraiture, also developed throughout this period: a Spanish school can be recognised given the distinctive characteristics of the paintings which belong to these themes. The use of the expression "still life painting" is already documented in 1599. The severe aesthetic of Spanish still life paintings contrasts with the lavish Flemish works: from the work of Juan Sánchez Cotán onward, the Spanish still life came to be defined as having simple, geometric compositions, with hard lines and Tenebrist illumination. Sánchez Cótan gained such success that many other still life painters followed suit: these include Felipe Ramírez, Alejandro de Loarte, the Court painter Juan van der Hamen y León, Juan Fernández, el Labrador, Juan de Espinosa, Francisco Barrera, Antonio Ponce, Francisco Palacios, Francisco de Burgos Mantilla, among others.

The Seville School also helped define the characteristics of the Spanish still life, with Velázquez and Zurbarán leading it. While the typical Spanish still life, while not exempt from the influences of Italian and Flemish Painting, was characterised for its moderation until the middle of the century, Flemish influences then added a richness, complexity, and even a theatricality to the paintings, including depictions of allegorical subjects. Examples of the impact of Flemish painting on the Spanish still life can be found in the flower paintings by Juan de Arellano and the Vanitas by Antonio de Pereda and Valdés Leal.

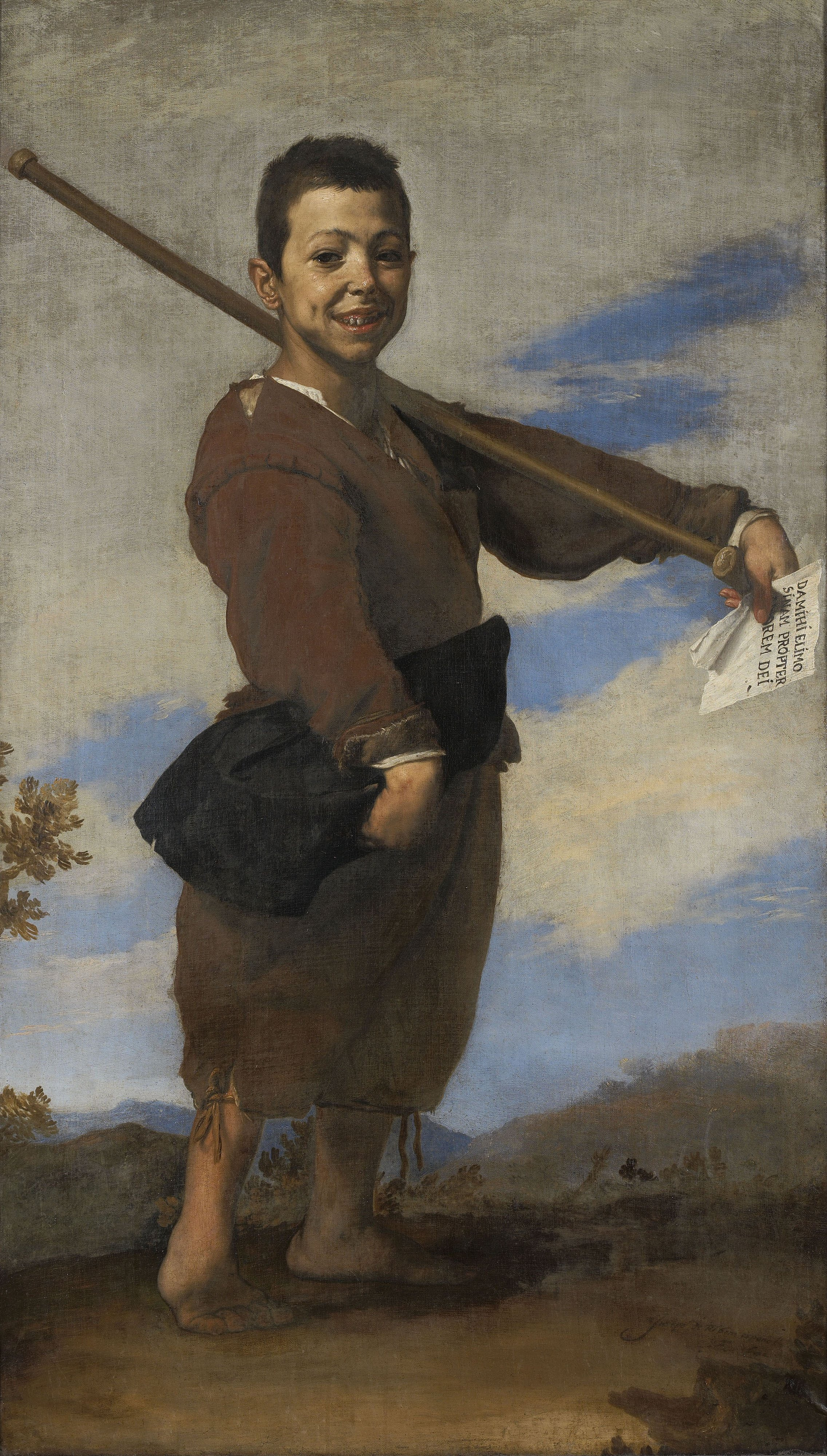
Jusepe de Ribera's The Clubfoot, a typical raw portrayal of human weakness by Spanish artists; 1642, oil on canvas, 164 × 92 cm, Louvre.

The portraiture of the Spanish Baroque period contrasted greatly from the extravagant portraits commissioned by other European courts. The figure of El Greco was decisive in the consolidation of the method used to produce portraits during this period. The Spanish portrait has its roots, on the one hand, in the Italian School (Titian), and, on the other, the Hispano-Flemish paintings of Antonio Moro and Sánchez Coello. The compositions are simple with very few embellishments, and transmit the intense humanity and honour of the subject. This, in contrast to the general trends of the Counter-Reformation, did not necessarily indicate that the subjects held great importance or were of high social status: all subjects were portrayed in the same way, whether they were kings, or street children.

Spanish Baroque portraits distinguish themselves from those of other schools by their severity; their raw portrayal of the soul of the subject; by the certain scepticism and fatalism they show towards life; and by the use of naturalism in the portrayal of the subject's features, far from the classicism generally defended by theorists. As is typical to the Counter-Reformation, the real takes precedence over the ideal. With the consolidation of Spanish portraiture was throughout the 17th century through the magnificent portraits by Velázquez, as well as those by Ribera, Juan Ribalta and Zurbarán, artists continued to reproduce the characteristics typical of the theme until the work of Goya.

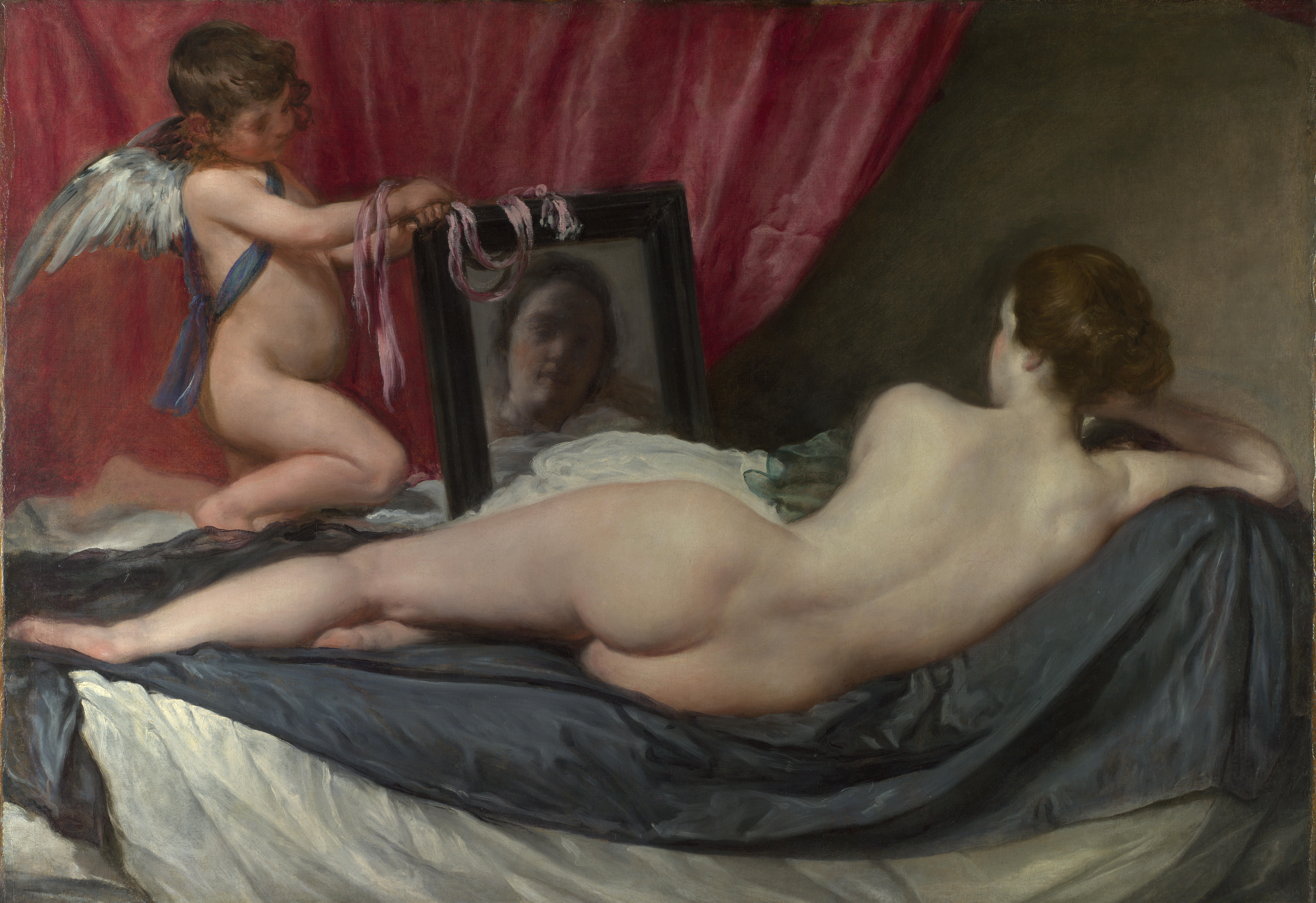
Diego Velázquez: Rokeby Venus, depicting Venus and Cupid; 1647–51, oil on canvas, 123 × 175 cm, National Gallery.

Paintings of this period containing historical or mythological themes can also be found, though to a lesser degree. Some examples of these have been signalled by collectors. In any case, in comparison with the 16th century, there is a notable increase in paintings depicting mythological subject matter which were not created exclusively for royal residences, and a production of independent works was established, logically, reached a wider audience and contained a greater variety of iconography.

Landscape paintings, like portraiture, were considered a theme of lesser importance by treatise writers, who placed the depiction of human figures at the apex of the hierarchy of genres. In Diálogos de la pintura, the first treatise on Spanish painting, Vincenzo Carducci wrote that landscape paintings would only be suitable for display in country houses or places of leisure, but that their value would increase if they depicted religious or historical scenes. Similarly, Franciscto Pacheco wrote in his textbook, Art of Painting, that, with regards to landscapes painted by foreign artists (mentioning Brill, Muziano and Cesare Arbasia, who mentored the Spanish painter Antonio Mohedano), he admits that landscapes are "an aspect of painting which should not be neglected", but nonetheless adheres to the traditional view regarding landscape painting, warning that they are afforded "little glory and respect by the greats".

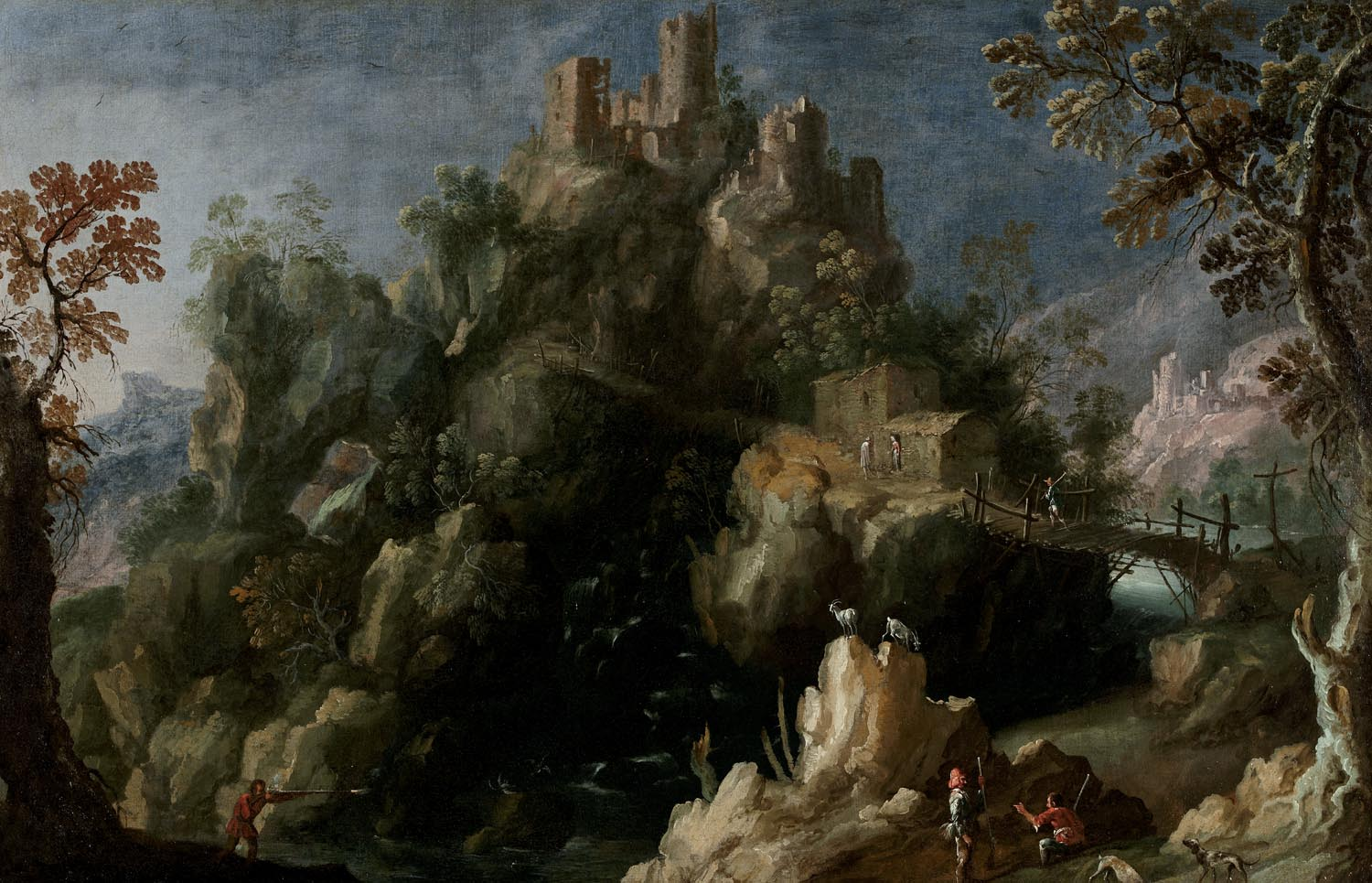
Ignacio de Iriarte: Landscape with Hunters, 1660, oil on canvas, 98 × 155 cm, Liria Palace.

Looking back at their inventories, we can see that this genre of painting was highly appreciated by the art collectors of the time; however, as collectors did not usually record the names of painters, it is not possible to know how many in these collections were produced by Spanish artists, or how many were imported. In contrast to Dutch Golden Age painting, there weren't authentic specialists in landscape painting in Spain, with the possible exception of the Basque painter Ignacio de Iriarte, who worked in Seville and associated with Bartolomé Esteban Murillo. Other painters, such as Francisco Collantes and Benito Manuel Agüero, who worked in Madrid, as well as Antonio del Castillo, from Cordoba, have also been praised for their landscape paintings.

== See also ==
- Spanish art
- Baroque painting
- Spanish Golden Age
- Spanish Renaissance
- Spanish Baroque architecture
- Spanish Baroque literature
