= Francisco Herrera the Younger =

17th-century Spanish painter

- Born: Francisco Herrera; 1622; Seville, Spain
- Died: 25 August 1685 (aged 62–63); Madrid, Spain
- Occupations: Painter, architect
- Father: Francisco Herrera the Elder

Francisco Herrera the Younger ("el Mozo"; 1622 – 25 August 1685) was a Spanish painter and architect.

== Life ==
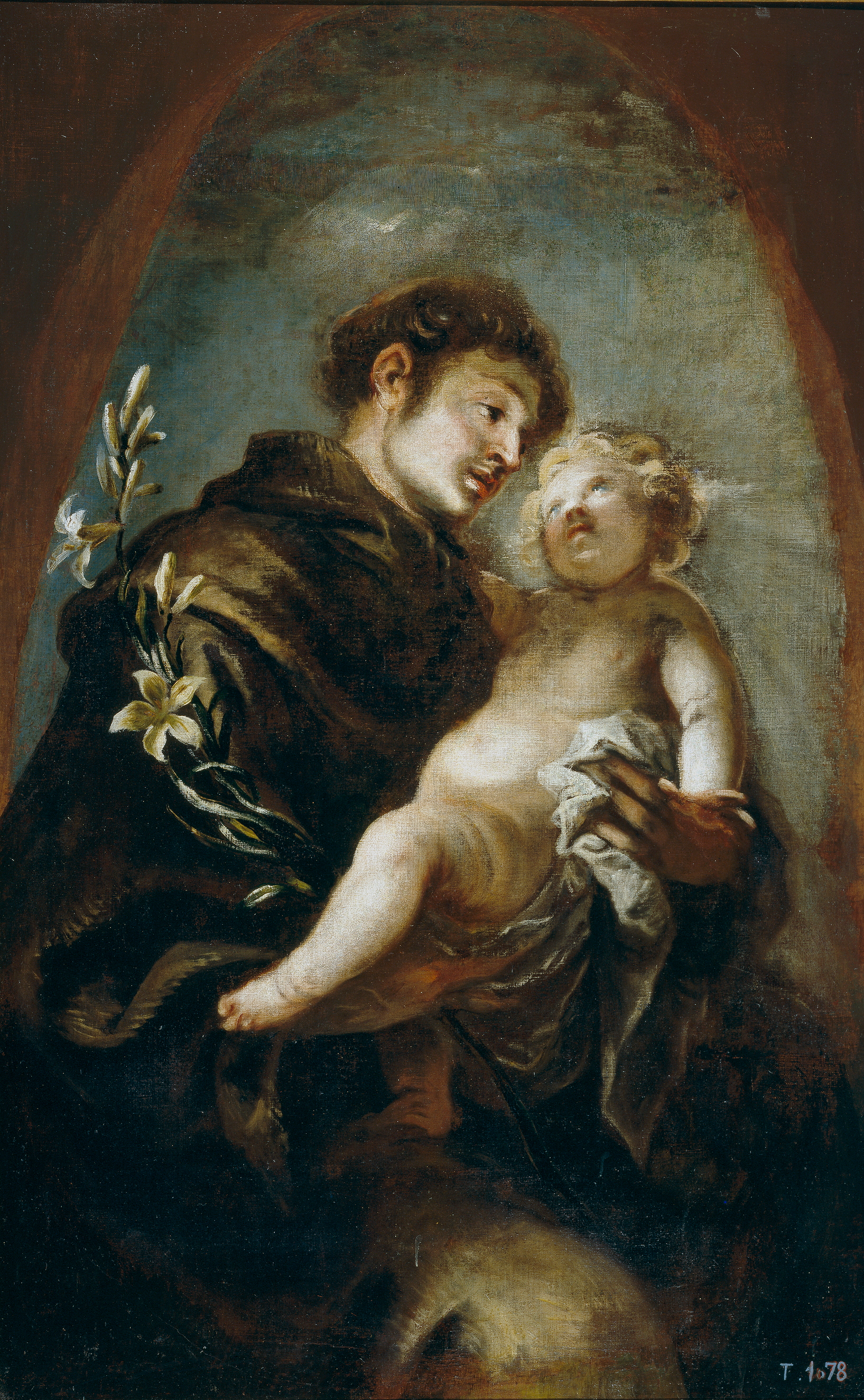
St. Anthony of Padua, Museo del Prado.

Born in Seville, he was the second son of Francisco Herrera the Elder ("el Viejo"), and began his career under his father's instruction; but the father's violent temper at last became so intolerable that the youth fled to Rome. For six years the younger Herrera devoted himself to the study of architecture, perspective, and the antique, his aim being fresco painting.

He excelled in still life. He already painted bodegones, fish so cleverly done that the Romans called him lo Spagnuolo dei pesci ("the Spaniard of the Fish"). In 1656 he returned to Seville, founded the Seville Academy, and in 1660 became its sub-director under Bartolomé Esteban Murillo.

He is said to have been vain, suspicious, hot-tempered, and jealous; at any rate he resented his subordinate post and went to Madrid about 1661 (Cean Bermúdez). Before leaving his native city he painted two large pictures for the cathedral and a "St. Francis" for the chapel of this saint. Edmund Walker Head declares the latter to be his masterpiece.

In Madrid he painted a great Triumph of St. Hermengild for the church of the Carmelite friars, and a group of frescoes in San Felipe el Real which was appreciated by Philip IV of Spain, who commissioned him the painting of the dome of the chapel of Our Lady of Atocha, and thereafter made him painter to the king and superintendent of royal buildings. Besides his work in still life he painted many portraits, and while these lacked the vigour which characterized his father's work, they exhibit a greater knowledge and use of chiaroscuro.

Charles II of Spain kept him at his Court and made him master of the royal works. For this king Herrera renovated the Basilica of Our Lady of the Pillar, in Zaragoza.

Herrera died at Madrid in 1685.
