= Rally Islas Canarias =

Spanish motorsport event

- Status: Active
- Genre: Motorsporting event
- Frequency: Annual
- Country: Spain
- Inaugurated: 1977

The Rally Islas Canarias, known originally as the Rally El Corte Inglés, is an international rallying event based on the Spanish island of Gran Canaria in the Canary Islands. The event has been a long running round of the European Rally Championship, the Spanish Rally Championship and the Canary Islands Rally Championship. It has also been a round of the Intercontinental Rally Challenge, the European Rally Cup South and the European Rally Cup West, and will join the World Rally Championship in 2025. The rally has been a tarmac rally event since inception.

First run in 1977 the rally was quickly popular for its location and climate as well as the Canary Islands reputation as a tourist destination. So much so that despite its isolated location, over 100 kilometres from the coast of Western Sahara, it has since 1979 been a part of Spain's national championship and has been an international event since 1982 when it was first included in the European Rally Championship. The events success could also be attributed to the similar and older Portuguese events the Rali Vinho da Madeira held on the island of Madeira 400 km to the north and Rallye Açores which is based on the island of São Miguel Island which is on the mid-Atlantic ridge.

In keeping with its importance as a Spanish event, Spanish drivers have dominated. Medardo Pérez won the first two events driving a BMW. Spain's world champion, Carlos Sainz won the event in five consecutive years from 1985 to 1989 in a variety of cars. Fellow Spaniards Jesús Puras and Luis Monzón have taken three wins as has Czech driver Jan Kopecký.

The tarmac nature of the event has led to a number of non-traditional rally cars winning the event with Porsche 911 taking five victories. In the 1990s the World Two Litre Kit Cars were able to upset the 4WD turbo cars, much as they were able to on similar events in the World Championship like the Tour de Corse.

The rally joined the European Championship in 1982 and maintained a calendar position until 2004 when it was demoted to the European Rally Cup West. In 2006 it moved from the West region to the South. It returned to the West region in 2007 before shifting to the Rally Cup South permanently in 2008. In 2010 the rally joined the Intercontinental Rally Challenge, replacing the Rally Príncipe de Asturias. It stayed on the calendar until the IRC folded in 2012. For the 2013 season its European status was promoted back into the European Rally Championship, again replacing Rally Príncipe de Asturias.

== List of winners ==
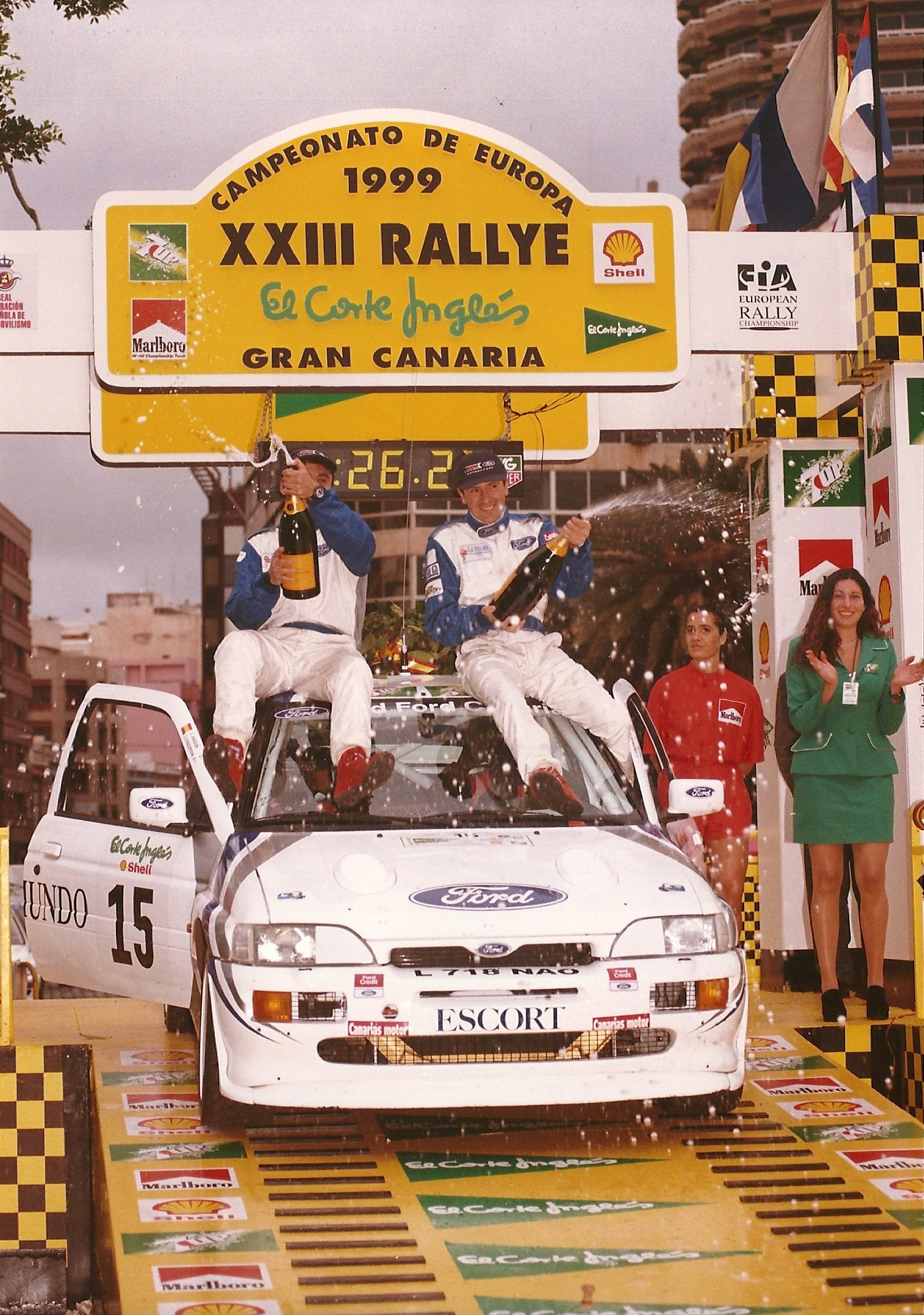
1999 Rally Gran Canaria

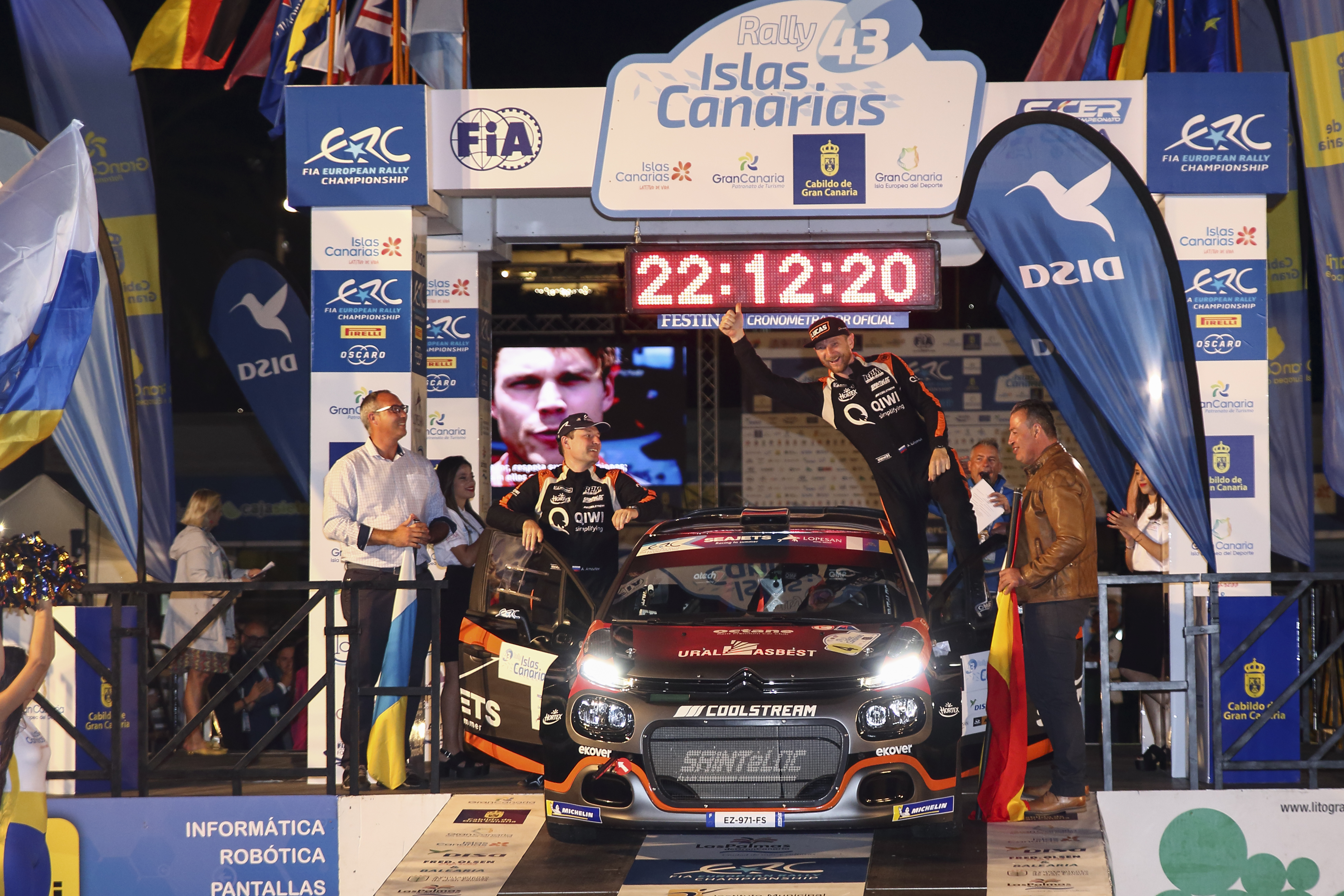
2019 European Rally Championship

Sourced in part from:

Year	Winner	Car
1977	(Spain) Medardo Pérez	BMW 2002
1978	(Spain) Medardo Pérez	BMW 2002
1979	(France) Marc Etchebers	Porsche Carrera 3.0
1980	(France) Marc Etchebers	Porsche 911 SC
1981	(Spain) Benigno Fernández	Porsche 911 SC
1982	(Spain) Eugenio Ortiz	Renault 5 Turbo
1983	(Spain) Eugenio Ortiz	Renault 5 Turbo
1984	(United Kingdom) Terry Kaby	Nissan 240RS
1985	(Spain) Carlos Sainz	Renault 5 Turbo
1986	(Spain) Carlos Sainz	Renault 5 Maxi Turbo
1987	(Spain) Carlos Sainz	Ford Sierra RS Cosworth
1988	(Spain) Carlos Sainz	Ford Sierra RS Cosworth
1989	(Spain) Carlos Sainz	Toyota Celica GT-Four
1990	(Spain) Josep Bassas	BMW M3
1991	(Italy) Fabrizio Tabaton	Lancia Delta Integrale 16V
1992	(Italy) Piero Liatti	Lancia Delta HF Integrale
1993	(Uruguay) Gustavo Trelles	Lancia Delta HF Integrale
1994	(Spain) Luis Monzón	Ford Escort RS Cosworth
1995	(Spain) José María Ponce	BMW M3
1996	(Spain) José María Ponce	Toyota Celica GT-Four
1997	(Spain) Jesús Puras	Citroën ZX Kit Car
1998	(France) Gilles Panizzi	Peugeot 306 Maxi Kit Car
1999	(Spain) Jesús Puras	Citroën Xsara Kit Car
2000	(Spain) Jesús Puras	Citroën Xsara Kit Car
2001	(Spain) Salvador Cañellas Jr.	Seat Cordoba WRC
2002	(Spain) Jesús Puras	Citroën Xsara WRC
2003	(Portugal) Miguel Campos	Peugeot 206 WRC
2004	(Spain) Luis Monzón	Toyota Corolla WRC
2005	(Andorra) Joan Vinyes	Peugeot 206 S1600
2006	(Spain) Miguel Fuster	Renault Clio S1600
2007	(Spain) Luis Monzón	Peugeot 206 WRC
2008	(Spain) Sergio Vallejo	Porsche 997 GT3
2009	(Spain) Sergio Vallejo	Porsche 997 GT3
2010	(Czech Republic) Jan Kopecký	Škoda Fabia S2000
2011	(Finland) Juho Hänninen	Škoda Fabia S2000
2012	(Czech Republic) Jan Kopecký	Škoda Fabia S2000
2013	(Czech Republic) Jan Kopecký	Škoda Fabia S2000
2014	(France) Didier Auriol	Citroën Xsara WRC
2015	(Spain) Miguel Fuster	Porsche 997 GT3 RS
2016	(Spain) Enrique Cruz	Porsche 997 GT3 RS
2017	(Russia) Alexey Lukyanuk	Ford Fiesta R5
2018	(Russia) Alexey Lukyanuk	Ford Fiesta R5
2019	(Spain) Pepe López	Citroën C3 R5
2020	(France) Adrien Fourmaux	Ford Fiesta R5 Mk. II
2021	(Russia) Alexey Lukyanuk	Citroën C3 Rally2
2022	(Spain) Nil Solans	Volkswagen Polo GTI R5
2023	(France) Yoann Bonato	Citroën C3 Rally2
2024	(France) Yoann Bonato	Citroën C3 Rally2
**2025**	(Finland) Kalle Rovanperä	Toyota GR Yaris Rally1
**2026**	(France) Sébastien Ogier	Toyota GR Yaris Rally1

Bold — event was part of the World Rally Championship.
