= Saint Francis (Zurbarán, Lyon) =

Painting by Francisco de Zurbarán

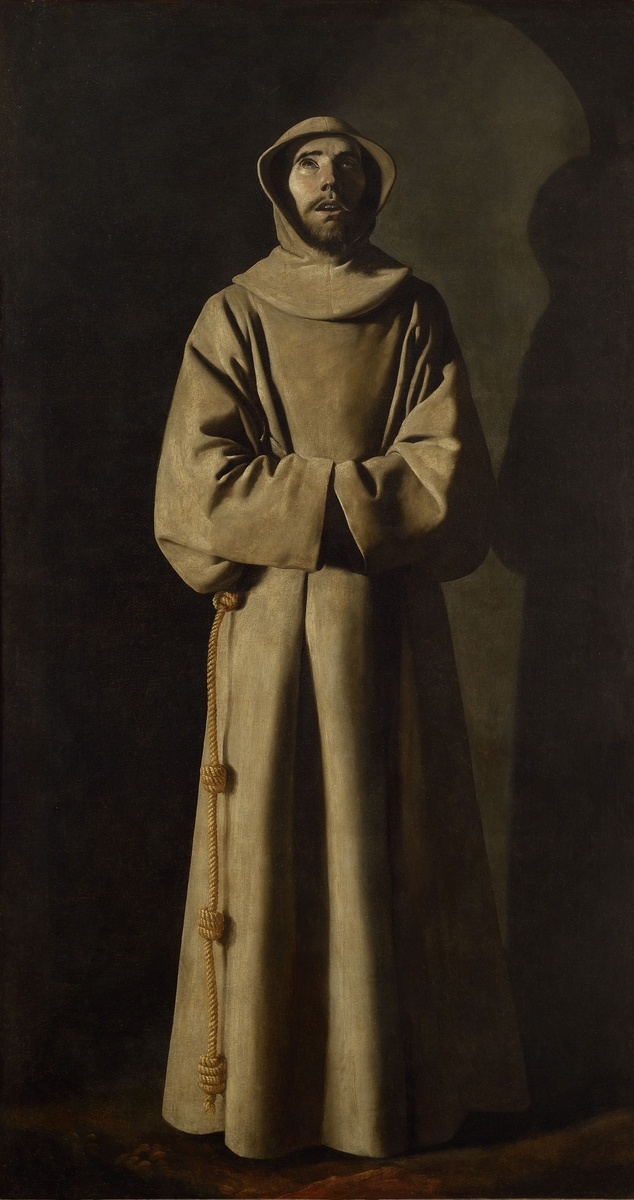
- Artist: Francisco de Zurbarán
- Year: 1659
- Medium: Oil on canvas
- Dimensions: 197 cm × 106 cm (78 in × 42 in)
- Location: Musée des Beaux-Arts, Lyon

Saint Francis is an oil painting of 1659 by the Spanish painter Francisco de Zurbarán depicting Saint Francis of Assisi. It was the only work by the artist known in France before the 19th century.

The painting seems to have been intended for a monastery in Madrid, before Maria Theresa of Spain gave it to the Colinettes Franciscan monastery in Lyon. This had been founded by the Marquis and Marquise de Coligny in 1665. During the French Revolution the painting was sold to Jean-Jacques de Boissieu, a painter and engraver in Lyon, who used it in 1797 as the model for one of his prints, Les pères du désert. A few years later, in 1807, de Boissieu sold it to the Musée des Beaux-Arts de Lyon. The painting was long misattributed to Jusepe de Ribera, before being reattributed to Zurbarán in 1847.

== Sources ==
- "Joconde – catalogue – dictionnaires". culture.gouv.fr.
