= Ignacio de Iriarte =

Spanish painter

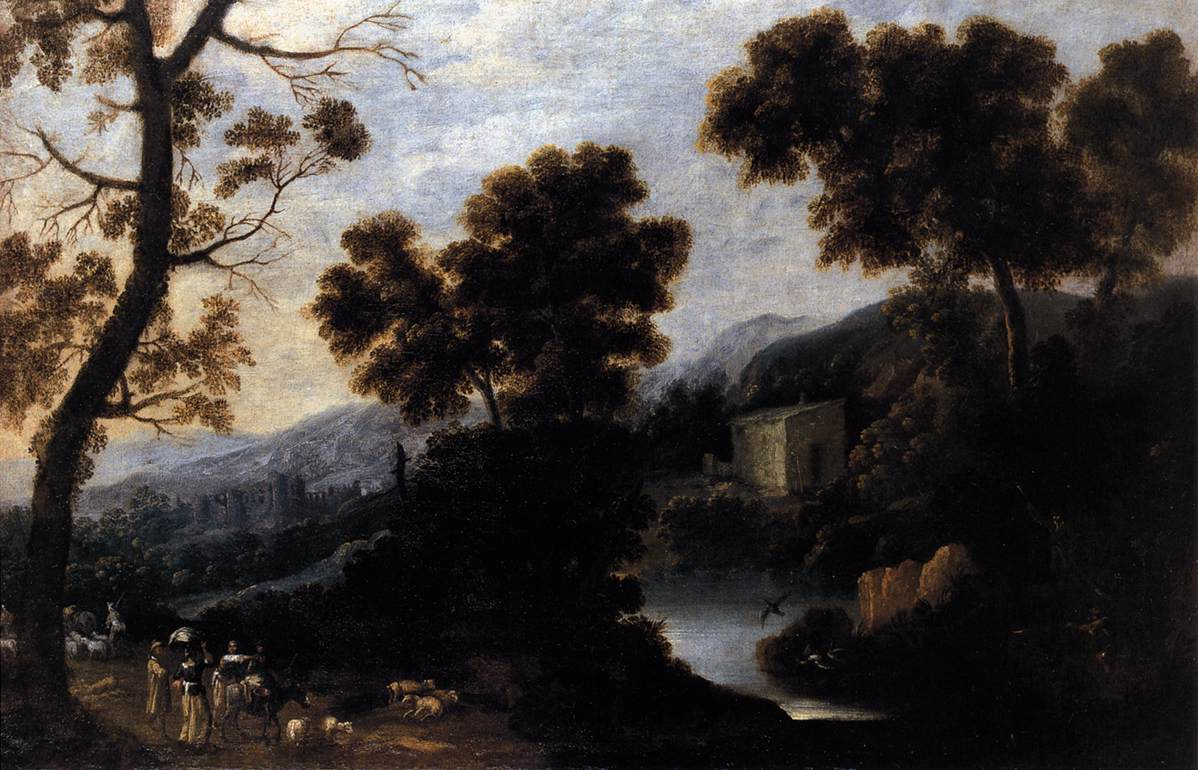
Landscape with Figures (c. 1660)

Ignacio de Iriarte (1620–1685) was a Spanish landscape painter.

== Biography ==
Iriarte was born in Azcoitia, Guipuzcoa. He received his early education at home, but in 1642 went to Seville, and entered the studio of Francisco Herrera the Elder.

By 1646, he was residing at Aracena, near to the mountains, and there it was that he married Doña Francisca de Chaves, but his first wife lived a very short time, and in 1649 he returned to Seville, where he married his second wife Doña Maria Escobar. He was an original member of the Academy of Seville, its first secretary in 1660, and again secretary from 1667 to 1669. For very many years, he was the intimate friend and associate of Bartolomé Esteban Murillo, who highly praised his landscapes, and on many occasions the two artists worked together, Murillo executing the figures, and Iriarte the landscape.

As a result of a dispute with reference to a series of pictures on the life of David, they stopped collaborating. Murillo painted the whole of the picture representing an episode in the life of David, and Iriarte contented himself with his exquisite landscapes, as a rule wild and rugged scenes, somewhat allied to those of Salvator Rosa, in which at that time he was the greatest exponent. There is a landscape preserved at Madrid in an unfinished condition, with the figures merely sketched in by Murillo and the background left incomplete by Iriarte, and this is said to have been left incomplete at the time of the quarrel. The painter has been called the Spanish Claude Lorrain, and Murillo declared that his best landscapes were painted "by Divine inspiration".

Iriarte died in Seville. His works are to be found principally in Madrid, but can also be studied in the galleries of St. Petersburg and the Louvre.

== Bibliography ==
- Antonio Palomino, An account of the lives and works of the most eminent Spanish painters, sculptors and architects, 1724, first English translation, 1739, p. 114
