= Francesc Ribalta =

Spanish painter (1565–1628)

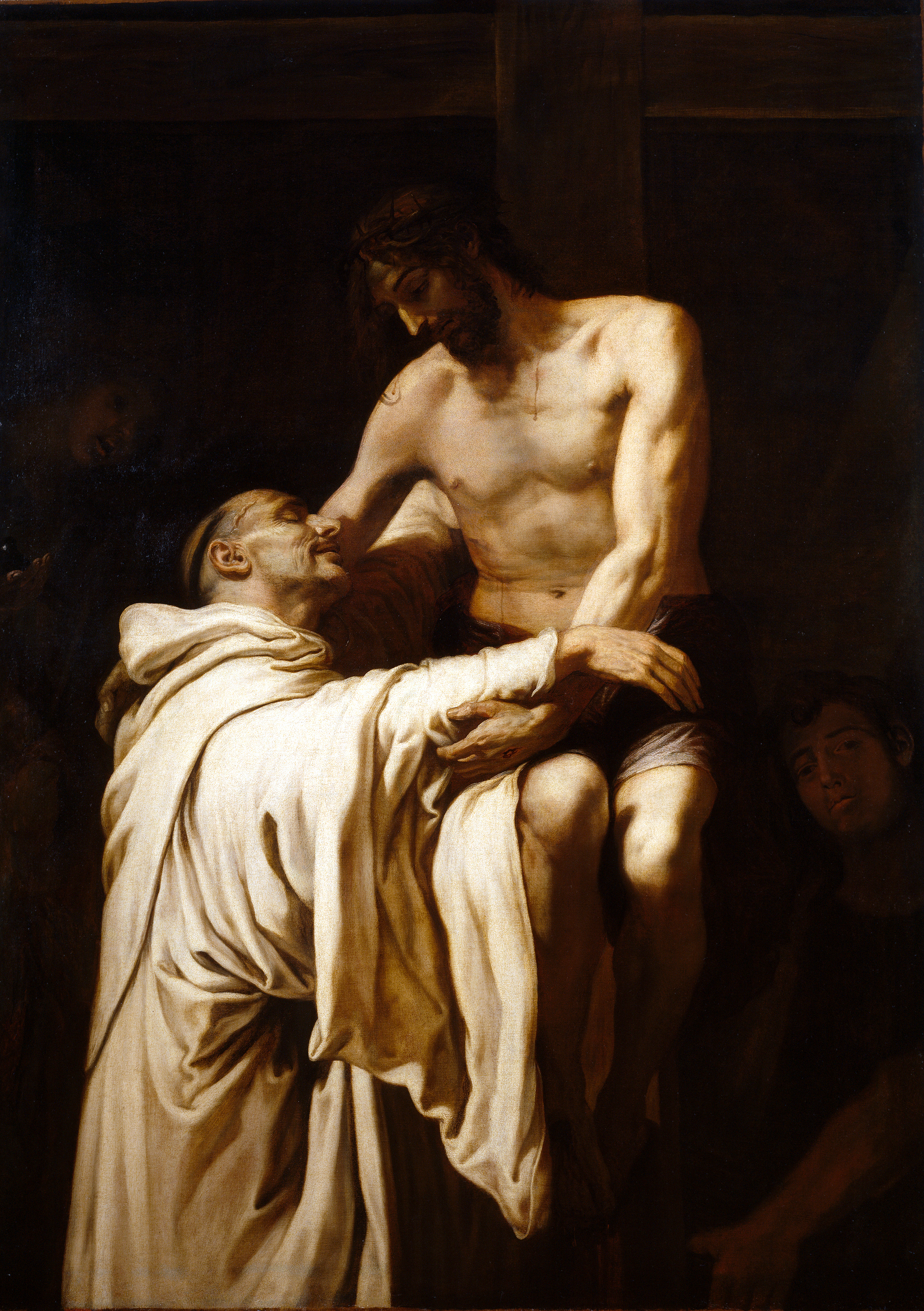
Deposed Christ embracing St. Bernard Clairvaux

Francesc Ribalta (2 June 1565 – 12 January 1628), also known as Francisco Ribaltá or de Ribalta, was a Spanish painter of the Baroque period, mostly of religious subjects.

== Biography ==
He was born in Solsona, Lleida. Although his first apprenticeship was apparently with Navarrete, who worked for years in the Escorial, Ribalta's earliest work (a Cruxifixion of 1582) was signed in Madrid. After his years in Madrid, Ribalta was to settle as an artist in Valencia. He became among the first followers in Spain of the austere tenebrist style of Caravaggio. It is unclear if he directly visited either Rome or Naples, where Caravaggio's style had many adherents.

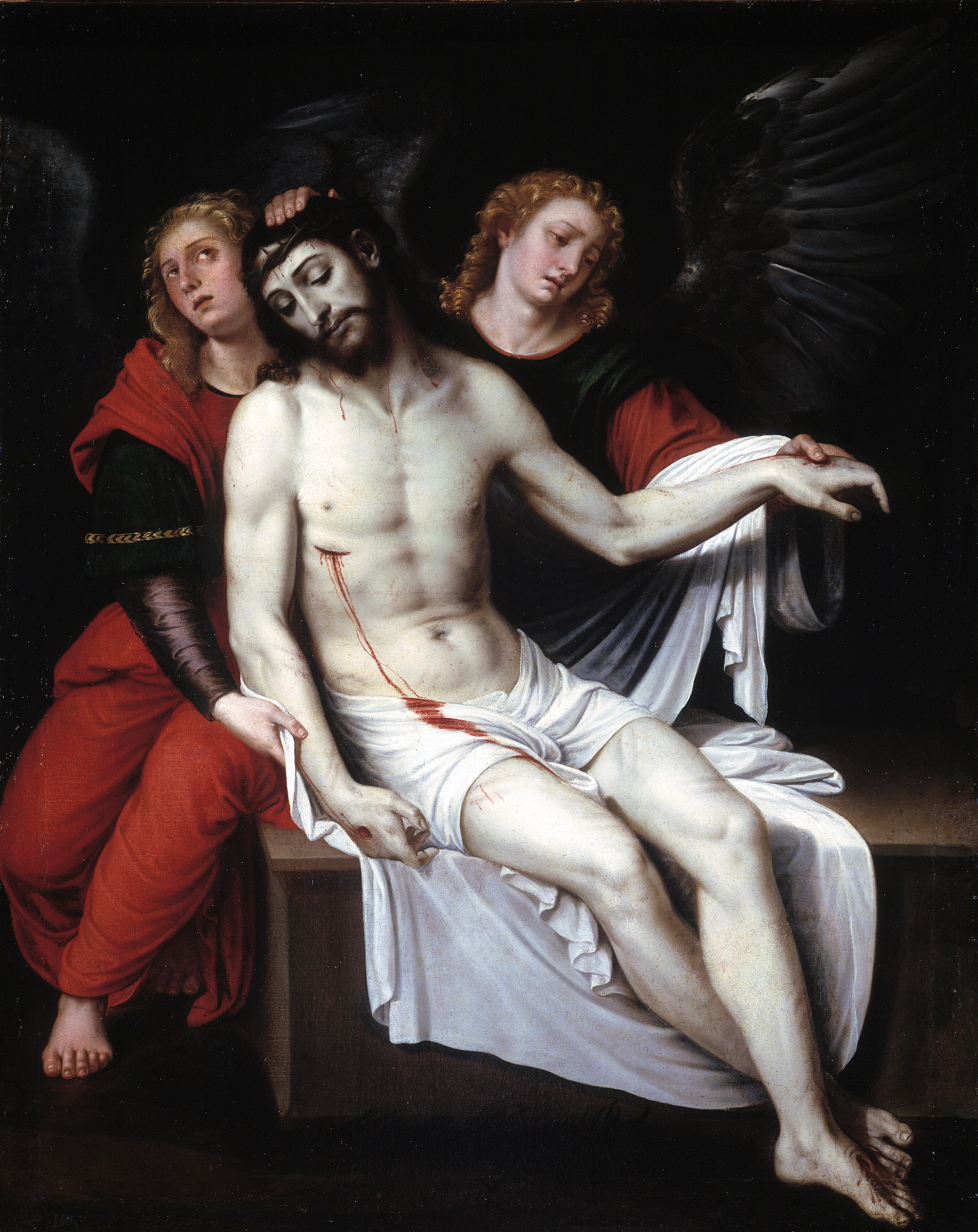
Cristo muerto, c. 1615

Alternatively, it is likely that tenebrist paintings were available in Spain by the early 17th century through the Spanish rule of the Neapolitan kingdom. Jusepe de Ribera is said to have been one of his pupils, although it is entirely possible that Ribera acquired his tenebrism when he moved to Italy.

== Style ==
The tenebrist style gathered a number of adherents in Spain, and was to influence the pre-eminent Baroque or Golden Age Spanish painters, especially Zurbarán, but also Velázquez and Murillo. Even the art of still life in Spain, the bodegón, was often painted in a similar stark and austere style. Among the direct disciples of Francisco were his son, Juan Ribalta, Antonio Bisquert, and his son-in-law, Vicente Castelló. Ribalta died in Valencia on 12 January 1628.

== Honours ==
A park and a monument bears his name along with his son in Castelló. Also the oldest high school of that city and its province.

== Works ==
- Crucifixion, his first work.
- Some works in El Escorial.
- Martyrdom of St. Peter
- Martyr of St. Catherine (around 1605), oil on panel 123x108 cm, The Hermitage, Saint Petersburg
- Portrait of Margarita Agulló (around 1605)
- The Vision of Father Francisco Jerónimo Simon, also known as the Venerable Simon (1612–19), oil on panel, 211x111 cm, National Gallery, London
- St. Francis Comforted by the Angel (San Francisco confortado por un ángel músico) (around 1620), oil on panel, 204x158 cm, Musel del Prado, Madrid
- Christ embracing Saint Bernard around 1625
- Ramon Llull (around 1620)
- Saint Roch (around 1625), oil on panel 124x60 cm, Museo de Bellas Artes, Valencia
- Saint Sebastian (around 1625), oil on panel, 124x60 cm, Museo des Bellas Artes, Valencia
- The Gospel of Saint Luke (1625–27), oil on canvas 83x36 cm, Museo de Portacoeli, Valencia

== Bibliography ==
- Benito Domenech, Fernando (1987). Los Ribalta y la pintura valenciana de su tiempo, Valencia-Madrid. ISBN 978-84-505-6705-2.
- Benito Domenech, Fernando y Vallés Borrás, Vicent Joan (1989). "Un proceso a Francisco Ribalta en 1618". Boletín de la Academia de Bellas Artes de San Fernando (69): p. 143-168. (in Spanish)
- Falomir Faus, Miguel (1998-1999). "Imágenes de una santidad frustrada: el culto a Francisco Jerónimo Simón, 1612-1619". Locvs Amoenvs (4): p. 171-183.
- Moffitt, John F. (1993). The Arts in Spain. 19. Thames and Hudson. pp. 128–133.
- Kowal, David M. (1985). Ribalta y los ribaltescos: La evolución del estilo barroco en Valencia. Valencia, Diputación Provincial. ISBN 978-84-505-1981-5.
- Palomino, Antonio, An account of the lives and works of the most eminent Spanish painters, sculptors and architects, 1724, first English translation, 1739, p. 28
- Palomino, Antonio (1988). El museo pictórico y escala óptica III. El parnaso español pintoresco laureado. Madrid, Aguilar S.A. de Ediciones. ISBN 84-03-88005-7.
- Pérez Sánchez, Alfonso E. (1992). Baroque Paintings in Spain (1600-1750). Cátedra, Madrid. ISBN 978-84-376-0994-2.
- Piombo (1995). Sebastiano del Piombo in Spain. Madrid, Museo del Prado, ISBN 84-87317-42-1.
