= Antonio Ponce =

17th-century Spanish painter

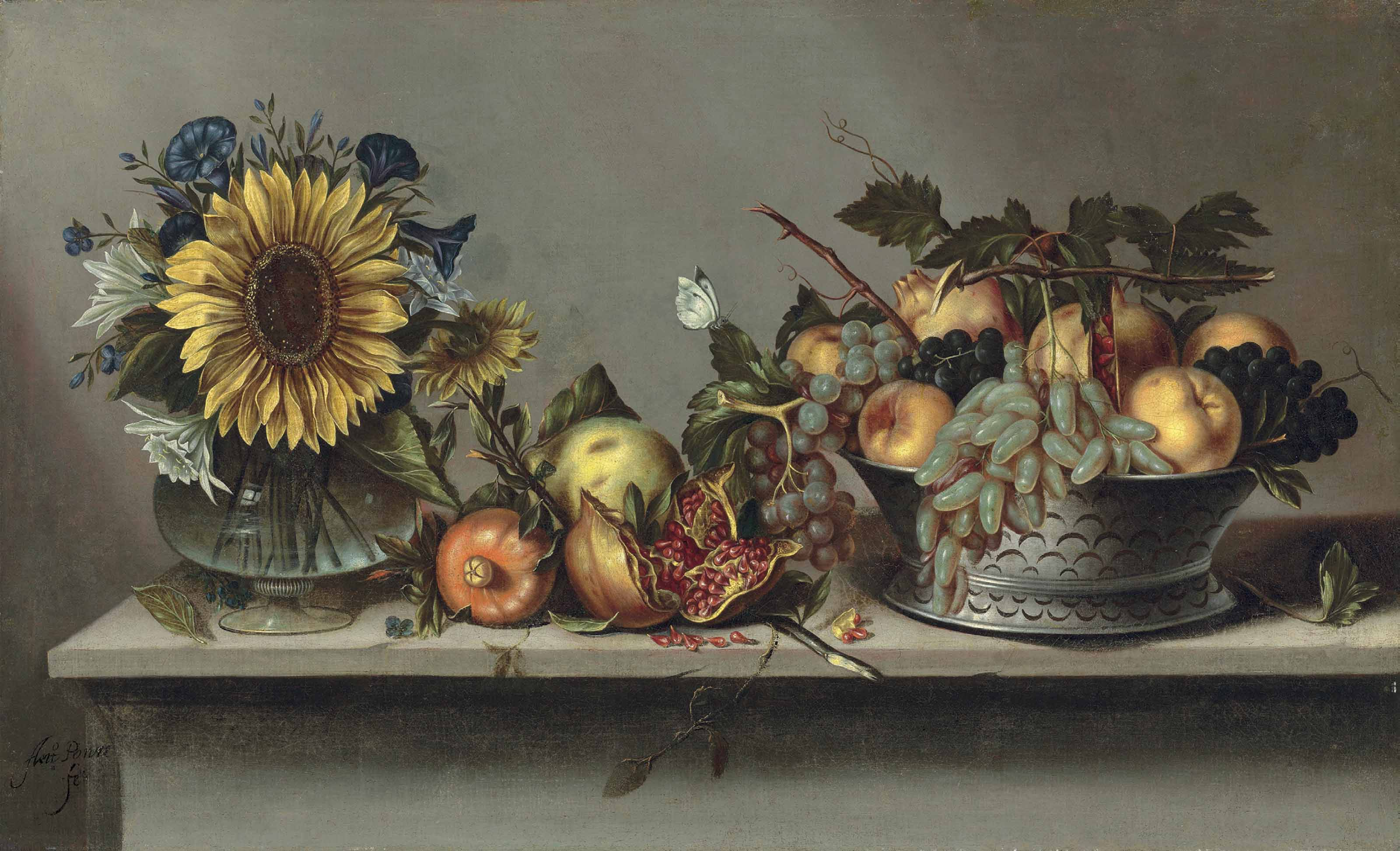
Still-Life with Flowers in a Vase and Fruit in a Bowl on a Ledge, 1640-60

Antonio Ponce (c. 1608, Valladolid – November/December 1677, Madrid) was a Spanish Baroque painter who specialized in still-lifes and garlands.

== Biography ==
He was the son of a servant in the household of Juan de Zúñiga, 1st Duke of Peñaranda. When he was only one month old (presumably following the Duke's death), his family moved to Madrid. In 1624, when his father died, he became an apprentice in the workshop of Juan van der Hamen, who may have been related. Upon completing his training, he married Francisca de Alfaro, Hamen's niece. In 1631, after Hamen's death, it is believed that, as a member of the family, he kept the workshop open and continued to paint in the same style, which has created difficulties with attribution although, after 1630, some of his works were signed.

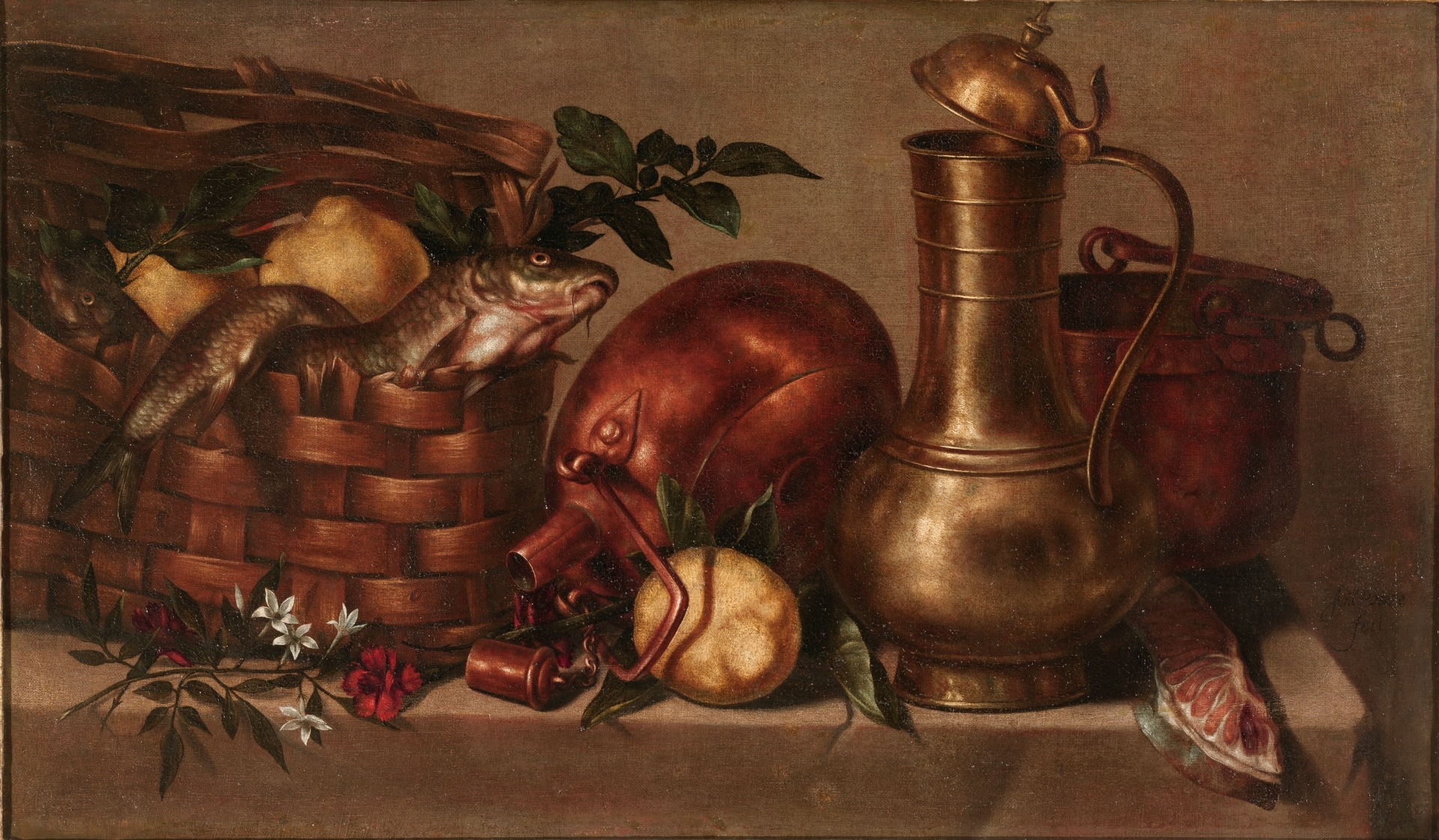
Kitchen Still Life (c. mid 17th-century)

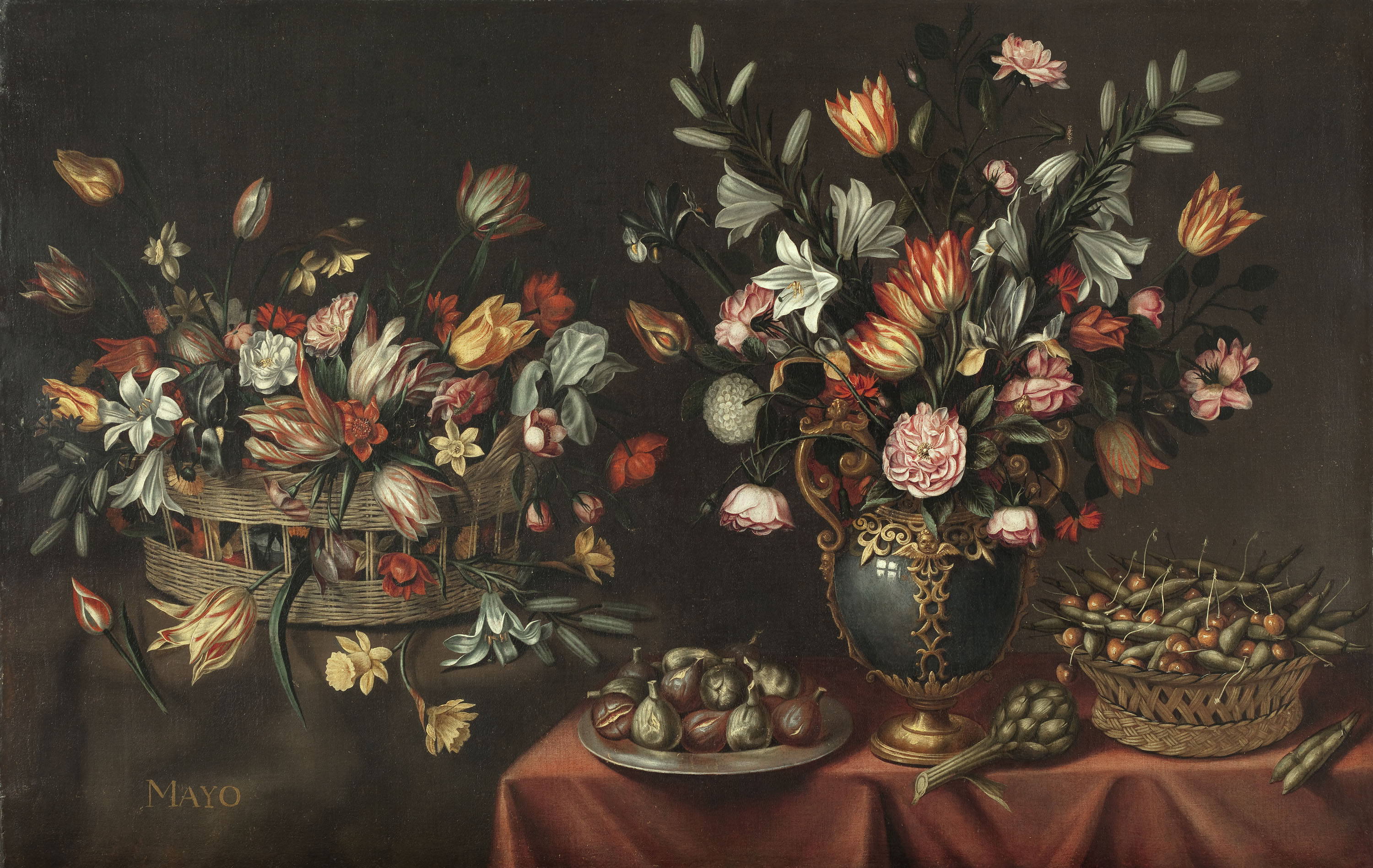
The Month of May (1635–40)

In 1633, he was among the painters whose workshops were raided by the government. Portraits of King Philip IV and the Royal Family were confiscated so they could be examined by Vicente Carducho and Diego Velázquez, to judge their quality and propriety. This resulted from complaints by local officials and members of the court that many painters possessed portraits which were no parecidos los más de ellos, y otros con hábitos indecentes (not like most of them and others with indecent habits). Apparently, nothing objectionable was found as, the following year, he became a member of the Painters' Guild.

In 1637, documents indicate that he was working on ephemeral decorations for the arrival of the Princess of Carignano and, a year later, creating decorations at the Palacio del Buen Retiro, together with Francisco Barrera. By 1642, business seems to have fallen off, as he requested an appointment as Inspector of Weights and Measures. He worked with Barrera again in 1649, making preparations for the visit of Queen Mariana of Austria. They were joined by the sculptor, Maunel Correa and several gilders, who would produce ten golden figures of Kings and emperors.

From then until his death, he is known only from the paintings he signed and a "Last Will and Testament", drawn up by him and his wife in 1657, although they were in good health and childless. A death certificate was issued in 1677. His wife survived him.
