= Juan Ribalta =

Spanish painter (1597–1628)

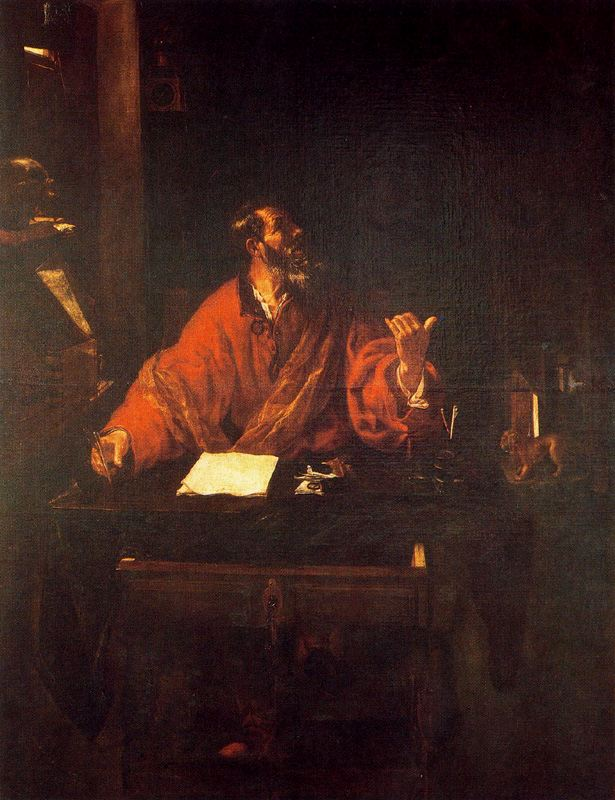
Saint Jerome

Juan Ribalta (1597 – October 1628) was a Spanish painter of the Baroque period. He was born and died in Valencia. His father, Francisco Ribalta, was a famous painter, active in the style of Caravaggio. Some sources said he was born in Madrid and later moved to Valencia. His mother Inés Pelayo died in 1601. Juan's works and style are similar to that of his father. He later painted Saint Sebastian at the Valencia Cathedral in 1616, later the small Adoration of the Shepherds (now at the Museo de Bellas Artes de Bilbao) and St. Peter, he also painted portraits including the poet Gaspar de Aguilar.

== Works ==
- St. Sebastian (1616), Valencia Cathedral
- The Adoration of the Shepherds, Museo de Bellas Artes de Bilbao
- St. Peter (around 1625), oil on panel, 167 x 123 cm, Museo de Pellas Artes de Valencia.
- St. John
- Portrait of the poet Gaspar de Aguilar, oil on panel 65 x 49 cm, Museo de Bellas Artes de Valencia
- St. Jerome, oil on panel, Museum of Arts of Catalonia, Barcelona
