= David LaChapelle =

American photographer (born 1963)

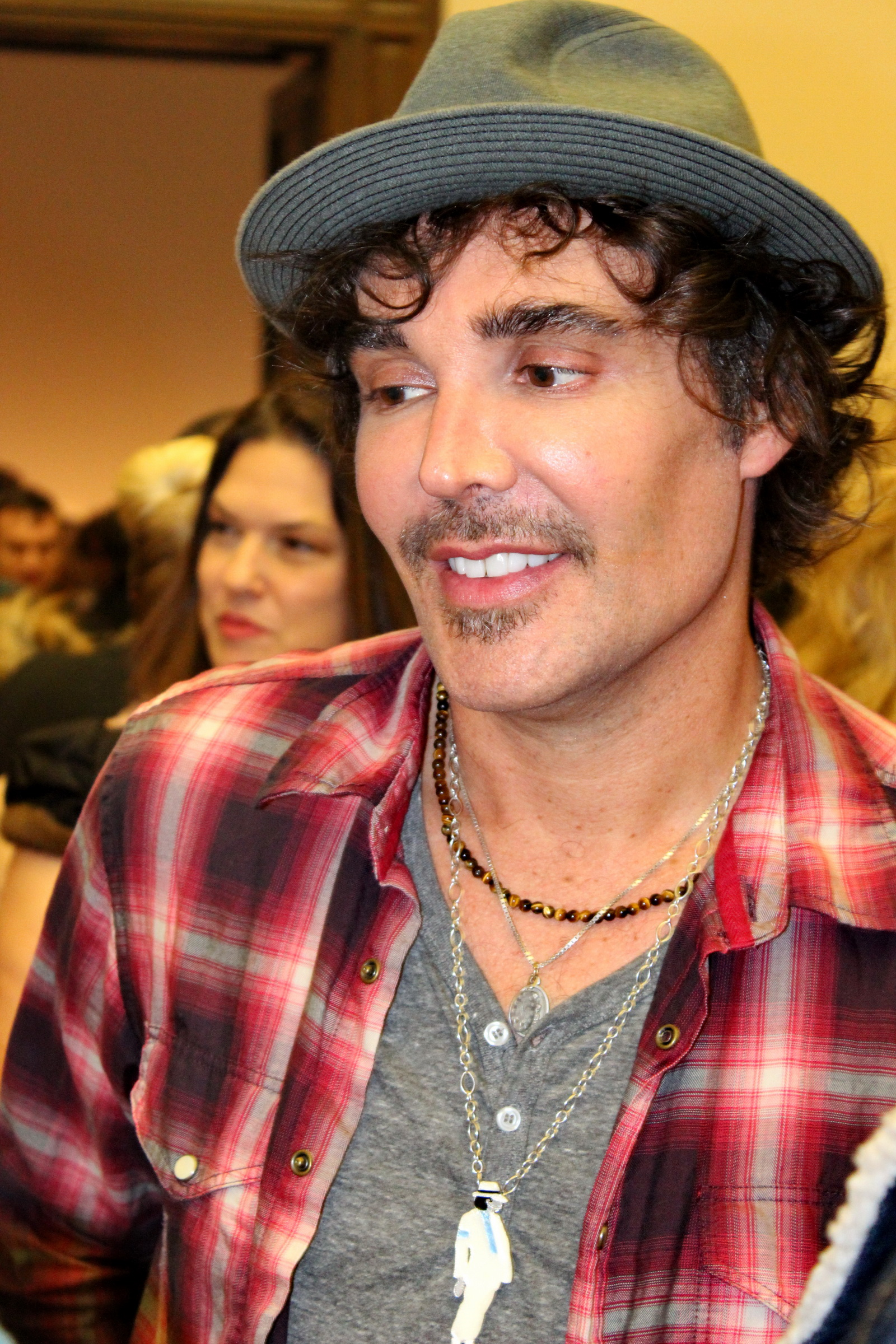
- LaChapelle in 2011
- Born: March 11, 1963 (age 63); Hartford, Connecticut, U.S.
- Occupations: Photographer; music video director; film director; artist
- Website: lachapellestudio.com

David LaChapelle (born March 11, 1963) is an American photographer, music video director, and film director. He is best known for his work in fashion and photography, which often references art history and sometimes conveys social messages. His photographic style has been described as "hyper-real and slyly subversive" and as "kitsch pop surrealism". Once called "the Fellini of photography", LaChapelle has worked for international publications and has had his work exhibited in commercial galleries and institutions around the world.

== Early life ==
David LaChapelle was born in Hartford, Connecticut to Philip and Helga LaChapelle; he has a sister Sonja and a brother Philip. His mother was a refugee from Lithuania who arrived at Ellis Island in the early 1960s. His family lived in Hartford until he was nine years old. He has said to have loved the public schools in Connecticut and thrived in their art program as a child and teenager, although he struggled with bullying growing up.

He and his family moved to Raleigh, North Carolina, where they lived until he was 14 years old, before returning north to Fairfield, Connecticut. He was bullied in his North Carolina school for his sexuality. When he was 15 years old, he ran away from home to become a busboy at Studio 54 in New York City.

Eventually he returned to North Carolina to enroll in the North Carolina School of the Arts.

His first photograph was of his mother Helga on a family vacation in Puerto Rico. LaChapelle credits his mother for influencing his art direction in the way she set up scenes for family photos in his youth.

== Photography beginnings ==
=== Early fine-art photography ===
LaChapelle was affiliated in the 1980s with 303 Gallery which also exhibited artists such as Doug Aitken. After people from Interview magazine saw his work exhibited, LaChapelle was offered work with the magazine. When LaChapelle was 17 years old, he met Andy Warhol, who hired him as a photographer for Interview while he was still in high school. Warhol reportedly told LaChapelle "Do whatever you want. Just make sure everybody looks good." LaChapelle's images subsequently appeared on the covers and pages of magazines such as Details, GQ, i-D, The New York Times Magazine, Rolling Stone, The Face, Vanity Fair, Vogue Italia, and Vogue Paris.

LaChapelle's work has been called "meticulously created in a high-gloss, color-popping, hyper-realistic style", and his photos are known to "crackle with subversive – or at least hilarious – ideas, rude energy and laughter. They are full of juicy life." In 1995 David LaChapelle shot the famous 'kissing sailors' advertisement for Diesel. It was staged at the peace celebration of World War II and became one of the first public advertisements showing a gay or lesbian couple kissing. Much of its controversy was due to it being published at the height of the "Don't ask, don't tell" debates in United States, which had led to the U.S. government to ban openly gay, lesbian, or bisexual persons from military service. In a long article published by frieze in 1996, the advertisement was credited for its "overarching tone of heavy-handed humor and sarcasm". In September 2011, when the "Don't ask, don't tell" law was finally removed by President Barack Obama, Renzo Rosso, the founder and president of Diesel who originally had approved and pushed for the advertisement, said "16 years ago people wouldn't stop complaining about this ad. Now it's finally accepted legally."

=== Awards ===
1995: "Best New Photographer of the Year" by French Photo and American Photo magazines 1996: “Photographer of the Year Award” at the VH-1 Fashion Awards “Applied Photography of the Year Award” from The International Center of Photography 1997: Best book Design 1998: Best “Cutting Edge Essay” and “Style Photography” at Life magazine’s Alfred Eisenstadt Awards for Magazine Photography 1999: Honored in the “Cover of the Year” 2000: Won "Best Video" for Moby's "Nature Blues" at the MTV Europe Music Award

=== Fine-art photography ===
Themes in LaChapelle's art photography, which he has developed in his Maui home, include salvation, redemption, paradise, and consumerism. It is clear that LaChapelle's "new direction highlights his interest and understanding of both contemporary practice and art history".

LaChapelle's images "both bizarre and gorgeous have forged a singular style that is unique, original, and perfectly unmistakeable." His photographs have been collected in a number of books. LaChapelle Land (1996) was selected as one of 101 "Seminal Photographic Books of the Twentieth Century" and is "highly valued by collectors". His second book, Hotel LaChapelle (1999), was described as a "garish, sexy, enchanting trip". Heaven to Hell (2006) featured "almost twice as many images as its predecessors", and "is an explosive compilation of new work by the visionary photographer". LaChapelle, Artists and Prostitutes (2006), a limited-edition, signed, numbered book contains 688 pages of photographs taken between 1985 and 2005. Artists and Prostitutes was published by Taschen and includes a photograph of the publisher Benedikt Taschen in a sadomasochism scene.

=== Exhibitions ===
In the first two decades of the 2000s, LaChapelle returned to a focus on fine art photography and exhibited his work in several galleries and museums. LaChapelle has had solo museum exhibitions at the Barbican Museum in London (2002), Kausthaus Wien in Vienna (2002), Palazzo Reale in Milan (2007), Museo del Antiguo Colegio de San Ildefonso in Mexico City (2009), the Musée de La Monnaie in Paris (2009), the Museum of Contemporary Art in Taipei (2010), and the Tel Aviv Museum of Art in Israel (2010).

By 2011, LaChapelle had an exhibition at the Lever House in New York and retrospectives at the Museo Arte Contemporáneo de Puerto Rico, the Hanagaram Design Museum in Seoul, and Galerie Rudolfinum in Prague. In the following years, LaChapelle's works were also exhibited at the Los Angeles County Museum of Art in LA (2012), the Musée d'Orsay in Paris (2013), Fotografiska Museet in Sweden (2013) and the National Portrait Gallery in Washington D.C. (2014).

In 2014, LaChapelle exhibited his series, 'Land Scape' in New York, Vienna, London, and Paris. Other shows include OstLicht Galerie fur Fotografie in Vienna, Austria, MAC Lima in Peru, Palazzo delle Esposizioni in Rome, and Museo de Arte Contemporáneo in Chile. In 2016, LaChapelle's work was shown at The Victoria and Albert Museum in London, DSC Gallery in the Czech Republic, at several venues in Montevideo in Uruguay and at the Edward Hopper House in New York. In 2018, LaChapelle exhibited 10 of his series in one exhibition, Good News For Modern Man, in the Groninger Museum (The Netherlands).

In 2024, LaChapelle held his first major museum solo exhibition in North America at Fotografiska New York titled Make Believe, which was also the museum’s first building-wide show. The exhibition featured over 150 works, combining some of LaChapelle’s most iconic images with new works.

=== Artistic influences ===
LaChapelle cites a number of artists who have influenced his photography. In a 2009 interview, he mentioned the Baroque painters Andrea Pozzo and Caravaggio as two of his favorites. A critic has noted that LaChapelle's work has been influenced by Salvador Dalí, Jeff Koons, Michelangelo, Cindy Sherman, and Andy Warhol. Richard Avedon noted that of all the photographers inventing surreal images, LaChapelle has the potential to be the genre's Magritte. Helmut Newton has also contributed to the discourse on LaChapelle, stating in a New York Times article by Cathy Horyn "He [LaChapelle] isn't very impressed by current photography. 'There's a lot of pornographic pictures taken by the young today ...A lot of the nudity is gratuitous. But someone who makes me laugh is David LaChapelle. I think he is very bright, very funny, and good'". LaChapelle is Catholic and often uses religious symbolism in his work.

== Personal life ==
LaChapelle has bipolar disorder, but as he feels drugs do not work for him, he is careful to monitor his mental health. In the mid-1980s, he lost his boyfriend of the time to AIDS. He relocated to London, where that city's counterculture proved enormously influential in forming his aesthetic. "I thought I'd seen it all. When I went to London, the level of creativity and insanity ... they were on a whole other planet." He was particularly struck by that culture's insistence on originality, rather than copying. For him, Los Angeles had been "the literal opposite". While living in London, he married the female publicist of the UK popstar Marilyn; the marriage lasted a year.

In 2006, LaChapelle abruptly left Los Angeles. He moved to a "very isolated part of Hawaii in this forest. It's off the grid, bio-diesel cars, solar-powered, growing our own food, completely sustainable. I thought 'OK, I'm a farmer now.'" LaChapelle's change in path eventually brought him back to his roots. While in Hawaii, a longstanding colleague invited him to shoot for a gallery, which he had not done since his days as a fledgling photographer in New York. "I was really shocked", LaChapelle recalled. "I'm so known as a commercial artist, a big name as a fashion and celebrity photographer, I didn't think a gallery will take me seriously. It's like being reborn; it's like rebirth; it's like starting over. It's back to where I started, where I very first started in galleries when I was a kid. It's just come full circle."

== Publications ==
- LaChapelle Land (New York: Simon & Schuster, in association with Callaway, 1996) - ISBN 0684833026
- David LaChapelle Exhibition (Palazzo delle Esposizioni, 1999)
- Hotel LaChapelle (Boston: Little, Brown, 1999) - ISBN 0821226363
- David LaChapelle, Barbican Gallery (Barbican, 2002) ISBN 978-390-12471-1-8
- David LaChapelle, If You Want Reality, Take the Bus (Artmosphere, 2003)
- David LaChapelle, second edition (Milan: Photology, 2004) - ISBN 8888359141
- LaChapelle Land, deluxe edition (New York: Channel Photographics, in association with Callaway, 2005) - ISBN 0976670801
- LaChapelle, Artists and Prostitutes (Köln: Taschen, 2006) - ISBN 3822816175
- David LaChapelle (Maurani & Noirhomme, 2006)
- LaChapelle, Heaven to Hell (Köln: Taschen, 2006) - ISBN 3822825727
- David LaChapelle (Firenze: Giunti, 2007) - ISBN 9788809057029
- David LaChapelle: al Forte Belvedere (Firenze: Giunti, 2008) - ISBN 9788809062320
- David LaChapelle (Hamburg: Stern Gruner + Jahr AG & Co., 2008) - ISBN 9783570197721
- David LaChapelle: Jesus is My Homeboy (Robilant & Voena, 2008)
- David LaChapelle: the Rape of Africa (Amsterdam: Reflex, 2009) - ISBN 9789071848070
- David LaChapelle, Delirios de Razon (212 Production, 2009) ISBN 9786079530006
- David LaChapelle, Moca Taipei Catalogue (Pascal de Sarthe & Fred Torres Collaborations for Taipei Culture Foundation/Museum of Contemporary Art, Taipei, 2010) ISBN 9789868529472
- Taschen 30th Anniversary: Golden Book of the Year (Köln: Taschen, 2010) ISBN 9783836522847
- David LaChapelle: Bliss Amongst Chaos (Fred Torres Collaborations, 2010) ISBN 9780615382043
- David LaChapelle, Maybach: Going Places (Daimler AG, 2010)
- Borders and Frontiers (Oakland University Art Gallery, 2011)
- David LaChapelle, Earth Laughs in Flowers (Distanz Verlag, 2011) ISBN 9783942405294
- David LaChapelle: Lost and Found (Pavleye Art and Culture, 2011) ISBN 9788090500600
- Nosotros: La Humanidad Al Borde (Museo de Arte Contemporaneo de Puerto Rico, 2011) ISBN 9781881723066
- Thus Spoke LaChapelle (Arbor vitae, Revnice, and Pavleye Art & Culture, 2011) ISBN 9788087164860
- LaChapelle: Exhibition at Robilant & Voena, London (Robilant & Voena, 2012) ISBN 9780956365064
- David LaChapelle: Earth Laughs in Flowers (Fred Torres Collaboration, 2012)
- David LaChapelle: In Seoul (Fred Torres Collaborations and de Sarthe Gallery, 2012)
- Burning Beauty (BankerWessel, Elanders Faith & Hassler, and Fotografiska) ISBN 9789186741020
- Still Life (Galerie Daniel Templon and Communic'Art, 2013) ISBN 9782917515129
- Land Scape: At Paul Kasmin Gallery (Damiani, 2013) ISBN 9788862083317
- David LaChapelle, Land Scape: At Robilant & Voena (Pure Print, 2014) ISBN 9780957428423
- Once in the Garden at OstLicht: Galerie fur Fotografie, (Brandstatter Verlag, 2014) ISBN 9783850338257
- David LaChapelle: Fotografia1s, (Tarea Asociacion Gradica Educativa, 2015) ISBN 9786124657320
- David LaChapelle: Dopo il Dilulvio, (Giunti Arte Mostre Musei, 2015) ISBN 9788809816077
- Botticelli Reimagined (Harry N. Abrams, 2016) ISBN 9781851778706
- Lost + Found Part I, Taschen, 2017
- Good News Part II, Taschen, 2017

*David LaChapelle: From Fashion Photography To Fine Art, Forbes Magazine ( Y-Jean Mun-Delsalle)

== Films ==
- Krumped (2004)
- Rize (2005)
- Unity (2015) – Narrator

== Videography ==
- Penny Ford – "I'll Be There" (1994)
- Space Monkeys – "Sugar Cane" (1997)
- The Dandy Warhols – "Not If You Were the Last Junkie on Earth" (1998)
- Kelis – "Good Stuff" (2000)
- Moby – "Natural Blues" (2000)
- Enrique Iglesias – "Sad Eyes" (2000)
- Elton John – "This Train Don't Stop There Anymore" (2001)
- Mariah Carey featuring Da Brat and Ludacris – "Loverboy" (2001)
- Elton John – "Original Sin" (2002)
- The Vines – "Outtathaway!" (2002)
- Christina Aguilera featuring Redman – "Dirrty" (2002)
- Avril Lavigne – "I'm with You" (2002)
- Jennifer Lopez – "I'm Glad" (2002)
- Whitney Houston – "Try It on My Own" (2003)
- Christina Aguilera featuring Lil' Kim – "Can't Hold Us Down" (2003)
- Macy Gray – "She Ain't Right for You" (2003)
- Christina Aguilera – "The Voice Within" (2003)
- Blink-182 – "Feeling This" (2003)
- No Doubt – "It's My Life" (2003)
- Britney Spears – "Everytime" (2004)
- Joss Stone – "Super Duper Love (Are You Diggin' on Me)" (2004)
- Norah Jones – "Those Sweet Words" (2004)
- Elton John – "Answer in the Sky" (2004)
- Gwen Stefani featuring Eve – "Rich Girl" (2004)
- Robbie Williams – "Advertising Space" (2005)
- Elton John – "Someone Saved My Life Tonight" (2006)
- Amy Winehouse – "Tears Dry on Their Own" (2007)
- Jennifer Lopez – "Do It Well" (2007)
- Florence and the Machine – "Spectrum (Say My Name)" (2012)
- Mariah Carey – "Almost Home" (2013)
- Daphne Guinness – "Evening in Space" (2013)
- Queen featuring Michael Jackson – "There Must Be More to Life Than This" (2014)
- Hozier – "Take Me to Church" (2015)
- Britney Spears - "Make Me..." (Unreleased) (2016)
- JADE - "Fantasy" (2024)
- Indochine – "L'Amour Fou" (2025)

== Exhibitions ==
- 2009: Delirios de Razón (Delusions of Reason), Museo de Las Artes, Guadalajara, Mexico
- 2010: Postmodern Pop Photography, Tel Aviv Museum of Art, Tel Aviv, Israel
- 2010: David LaChapelle at Museum of Contemporary Art Taipei, Taiwan
- 2011: Thus Spoke LaChapelle, Galerie Rudolfinum, Prague, Czech Republic
- 2012: Burning Beauty, Fotografiska Museet, Stockholm, Sweden
- 2015: David LaChapelle: Dopo Il Diluvio, Palazzo Delle Esposizioni, Rome, Italy
- 2016: David LaChapelle: Gas Stations, Edward Hopper House, Nyack, New York
- 2016: David LaChapelle: Inscape of Beauty, Ara Modern Art Museum, Seoul, Republic of Korea
- 2017: David LaChapelle: Lost + Found, Casa dei Tre Oci, Venice, Italy
- 2024: make Believe, Fotografiska New York, New York
- 2026: David LaChapelle: As the World Turns, Orlando, Florida
- 2026: Photography in Power (group exhibition), Fotografiska Tallinn, Estonia

== Awards ==
- Doctorate in Fine Arts (Hon.) from UNCSA, 2015
- Young Photographers Alliance Lifetime Achievement Award
- Artist of the Year, American Friends of the Tel Aviv Museum of Art, 2012
- National Geographic Photography Seminar, Featured Speaker, 2012
- GLAAD Vito Russo Award for Outstanding Contributions Toward Eliminating Homophobia, 2006
- 13th Annual MVPA Awards- Winner, Director of the Year- Best Rock Video of the Year for No Doubt's "It's My Life", 2004
- Special Juried Prize Mountain Film, Telluride, 2004
- Special Juried Recognition, Sundance Film Festival, 2004
- Best Documentary, Aspen Film Festival, 2004
- 12th Annual MVPA Awards, Adult Contemporary Video of the Year, Elton John's "This Train Don't Stop There Anymore", 2003
- Best Video for Moby's "Natural Blues", the MTV Europe Music Awards, 2000
- Best "Cutting Edge Essay" and "Style Photography" at Life magazine's Alfred Eisenstaedt Awards for Magazine Photography (the Eisies)
- Art Directors Club Award for Best Book Design for LaChapelle Land, 1997

== Public collections ==
- Bayerische Staatsoper Portrait Gallery, Munich, Germany
- Los Angeles County Museum of Art, Los Angeles, CA
- National Portrait Gallery, London, UK
- Tel Aviv Museum of Art, Tel Aviv, Israel
