= Busato =

Busato is an Italian surname. Notable people with the surname include:

- Gianluca Busato (born 1969), Italian entrepreneur, engineer, activist and politician
- Giovanni Busato (1806–1886), Italian painter
- Gualtiero Busato (1941–2025), Italian-born French sculptor
- Matteo Busato (born 1987), Italian racing cyclist
- Mattia Busato (born 1993), Italian karateka
