= Venetians Movement =

Logo

Venetians Movement (Movimento Veneti) was a Venetist separatist cross-party political movement which aims to promote independence regardless of individual political positions such as left or right, in a democratic and nonviolent way. The complete name of the movement, which was founded on 26 November 2006 in Padua, was Venetians Movement for the Independence of Venetia (Movimento Veneti par ła Indipendensa de ła Venetia), but it was commonly known also as The Venetians (I Veneti). The movement demands independence for the so-called Venetia, a country that would be composed of all the territories of the historical Republic of Venice, covering the current Veneto, Friuli-Venezia Giulia, some provinces of Lombardy (Brescia, Bergamo, Cremona and Mantova), a portion of Trentino (see chart).

Differently from other Venetist parties such as Liga Veneta, Liga Veneta Repubblica and North-East Project, Venetians in Movement did not present itself to elections, because it recognizes that the already high number of independentist parties was not bringing much results in favour of independence. A possible future transformation into party was scheduled in its statute, however, only when the socio-political situation provides favourable conditions. Moreover, the movement did not recognize the inclusion of Veneto in Italy in 1866 by a possibly rigged referendum, as claimed by some Venetist historians such as Ettore Beggiato and Gianpaolo Borsetto. According to the Venetians' website FAQ page, although Italian law is de facto in force in Veneto, the independence of Veneto did not imply breaking the unity of Italy because Veneto is not formally a part of Italy («We do not secede or break away from Italy because, in order to do so we should be part of it») for a number of reasons. First, «Italy was proclaimed without the Venetian lands», consequently «Italy's existence does not depend on the Venetian land. Even without the Venetian land, Italy would still be united, as it was united before adding Veneto». Second, the annexation of the Venetian land was not legitimized by any military conquest: «Italy did not win, its allied won». Third, the annexation was not legitimized by any democratic vote: «a referendum was required for the annexation [...but it] was neither free, nor secret». Fourth, «the annexation took place two days before the vote». Fifth, the political unity of the Italian Peninsula is not even reached today, as the Peninsula is still split in three States: «Italian Republic, Vatican City State and Most Serene Republic of San Marino».

One of the founding members of the movement, Gianluca Busato, launched the Venetian National Party (PNV) in 2007. In the run up of the 2009 municipal elections, The Venetians invited Carlo Covi of Venetian Agreement to a convention, leading some to think that this was an endorsement. Shortly after in fact, in November 2009 the movement joined other Venetist parties, including Venetian Agreement and Liga Veneta Repubblica, in forming Veneto Freedom. However, as soon as in January 2010, the coalition disbanded and its independentist core formed a more coherent outfit, the Party of the Venetians, which was later merged in September 2010 with the PNV to form Veneto State, a united Venetist-separatist party. A leading member of The Venetians, Giustino Cherubin, was elected president of the new party.

== Leadership ==
- President: Patrik Riondato (2006–2010)

The Minor Conséjo, named after one of the institutions of the late Republic of Venice and also known as National Council, functions as executive secretariat of the party. It was composed by Patrik Riondato, Ivan Salvador, Giustino Cherubin and Fabrizio Disarò.
