= Party of Venetians =

Party of Venetians might refer to:

- Party of Venetians (2010), political party in Veneto
- Party of Venetians (2019), coalition of parties in Veneto
