= Venetian People's Unity =

Party flag

The Venetian People's Unity (Unitá Popołare Veneta, UPV) is a Venetist socialist and separatist political party.

Founded in 2008, the party seeks to represent the Venetian left wing and takes example from Herri Batasuna. According to its website, the party's goal is to create a "synthesis between socialist ideals, the defense of Venetian national identity and the fight for the self-determination of Venetian lands": in this respect, the UPV seeks to "spread Venetism within the left-wing and the left-wing within Venetism, in order to form a Venetian independentist and identitarian left".

In November 2009 the UPV joined other separatist parties, including the more mainstream Liga Veneta Repubblica and grassroots Venetians Movement, to form Veneto Freedom. However, as soon as in January 2010, the coalition was disbanded and its independentist core formed a more coherent outfit, the Party of the Venetians (PdV). In September 2010 the PdV was merged into Veneto State, but the UPV retained its identity within the new party.

In January 2012 the UPV endorsed the faction of Veneto State led by Antonio Guadagnini. Riccardo Lovato, the UPV spokesperson, addressed the party's congress and proposed a coalition between the two parties.

In April 2014 Lovato was arrested, along with a group of Venetian separatists (including Franco Rocchetta, leading members of the Venetian Most Serene Government and the European Federalist Free Entrepreneurs), for suspected crimes including criminal association for terrorism and subversion of the democratic order. Lovato was released on 18 April, along with Rocchetta and most of the others, as the tribunal of Brescia did not uphold the accusations.

== Leadership ==
- Spokesperson: Riccardo Lovato (2008–present)
