= 2024 Rally Italia Sardegna =

21st edition of Rally Italia Sardegna

2024 Rally Italia Sardegna Rally di Sardegna 2024
Round 6 of 13 in the 2024 World Rally Championship
← Previous event	Next event →
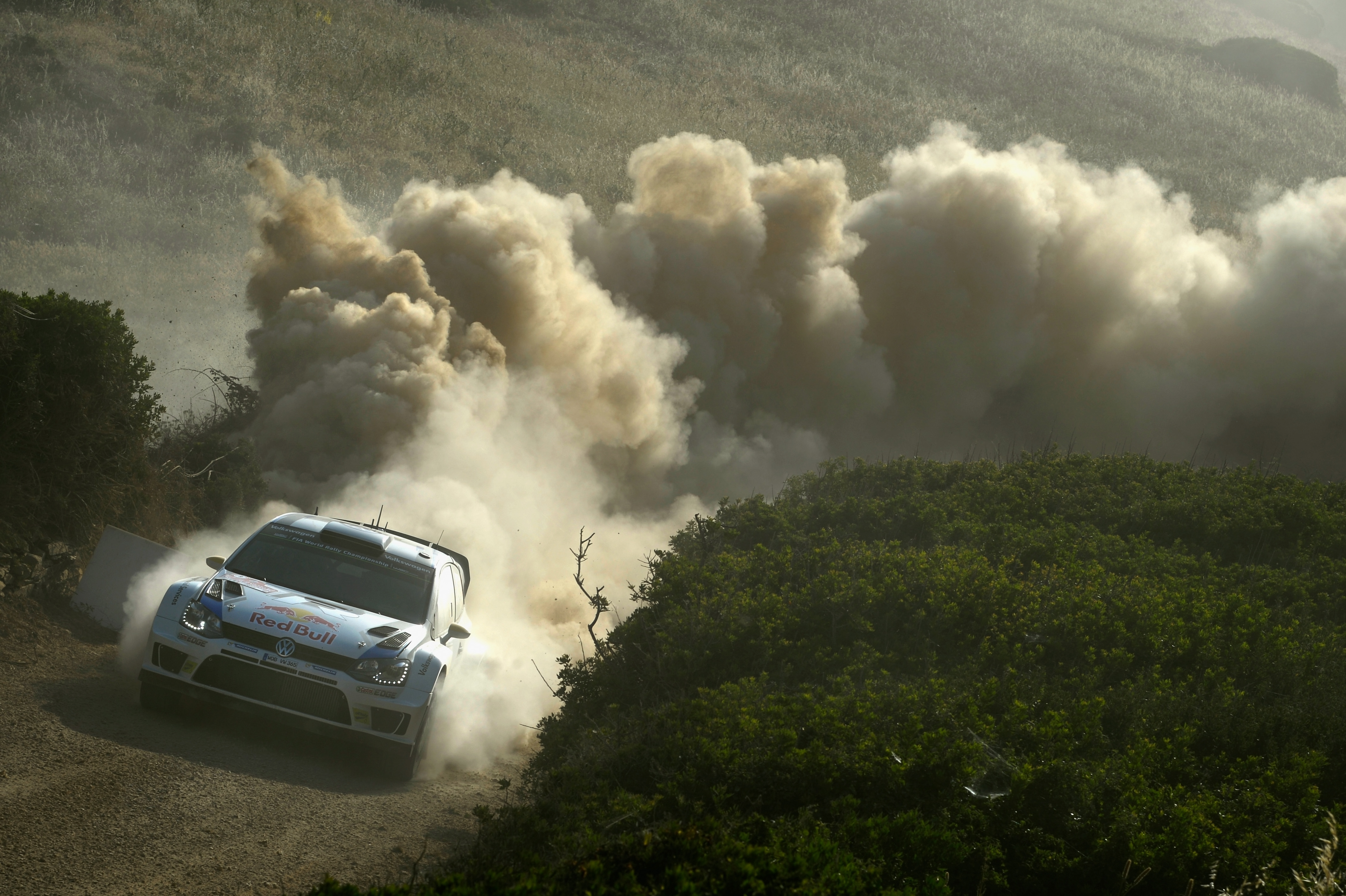
- The Sardinia Rally is known for its fast but narrow roads.
- Host country: Italy
- Rally base: Alghero, Sassari
- Dates run: 30 May – 2 June 2024
- Start location: Olbia, Sassari
- Finish location: Sassari, Sassari
- Stages: 16 (266.12 km; 165.36 miles)
- Stage surface: Gravel
- Transport distance: 761.78 km (473.35 miles)
- Overall distance: 1,027.90 km (638.71 miles)

Statistics
- Crews registered: 84
- Crews: 79 at start, 68 at finish

Overall results
- Overall winner: (Estonia) Ott Tänak (Estonia) Martin Järveoja (South Korea) Hyundai Shell Mobis WRT; 3:06:05.6
- Saturday Overall leader: (France) Sébastien Ogier (France) Vincent Landais (Japan) Toyota Gazoo Racing WRT
- Sunday Accumulated leader: (Belgium) Thierry Neuville (Belgium) Martijn Wydaeghe (South Korea) Hyundai Shell Mobis WRT; 26:02.7
- Power Stage winner: (Belgium) Thierry Neuville (Belgium) Martijn Wydaeghe (South Korea) Hyundai Shell Mobis WRT; 4:55.0

Support category results
- WRC-2 winner: (Finland) Sami Pajari (Finland) Enni Mälkönen (Finland) Printsport; 3:13:19.0
- WRC-3 winner: (Paraguay) Diego Dominguez Jr. (Spain) Rogelio Peñate; 3:33:09.3
- J-WRC winner: (Paraguay) Diego Dominguez Jr. (Spain) Rogelio Peñate; 3:33:09.3

The 2024 Rally Italia Sardegna (also known as the Rally di Sardegna 2024) was a motor racing event for rally cars held over four days from 30 May to 2 June 2024. It marked the twenty-first running of the Rally Italia Sardegna, and was the sixth round of the 2024 World Rally Championship, World Rally Championship-2 and World Rally Championship-3. The event was also the third round of the 2024 Junior World Rally Championship. The 2024 event was based in Olbia in the Province of Sassari, and was contested over sixteen special stages, covering a total competitive distance of 266.12 km (165.36 mi).

Thierry Neuville and Martijn Wydaeghe were the defending rally winners. Their team, Hyundai Shell Mobis WRT, were the defending manufacturer's winners. Andreas Mikkelsen and Torstein Eriksen were the defending rally winners in the WRC-2 category. Roope Korhonen and Anssi Viinikka were the defending rally winners in the WRC-3 category. William Creighton and Liam Regan were the defending rally winners in the junior category.

Ott Tänak and Martin Järveoja won the rally, with their team, Hyundai Shell Mobis WRT, successfully defended their titles. The victory would match the record for the closest finish to a WRC event; the winning margin of 0.2 seconds equalling that of the 2011 Jordan Rally. Sami Pajari and Enni Mälkönen won the World Rally Championship-2 category. Diego Dominguez Jr. and Rogelio Peñate won the World Rally Championship-3 category, as well as the junior class.

== Background ==
=== Entry list ===
The following crews are set to enter into the rally. The event is set to be opened to crews competing in the World Rally Championship, its support categories, the World Rally Championship-2, World Rally Championship-3 as well as the Junior World Rally Championship, and privateer entries that are not registered to score points in any championship. Eight are set to enter under Rally1 regulations, as are forty Rally2 crews in the World Rally Championship-2 and twenty Rally3 crew in the World Rally Championship-3. A total of eighteen crews are set to be participated in the Junior World Rally Championship.

Rally1 entries competing in the World Rally Championship
No.	Driver	Co-Driver	Entrant	Car	Championship eligibility	Tyre
6	(Spain) Dani Sordo	(Spain) Cándido Carrera	(South Korea) Hyundai Shell Mobis WRT	Hyundai i20 N Rally1	Driver, Co-driver, Manufacturer	P
8	(Estonia) Ott Tänak	(Estonia) Martin Järveoja	(South Korea) Hyundai Shell Mobis WRT	Hyundai i20 N Rally1	Driver, Co-driver, Manufacturer	P
11	(Belgium) Thierry Neuville	(Belgium) Martijn Wydaeghe	(South Korea) Hyundai Shell Mobis WRT	Hyundai i20 N Rally1	Driver, Co-driver, Manufacturer	P
13	(Luxembourg) Grégoire Munster	(Belgium) Louis Louka	(United Kingdom) M-Sport Ford WRT	Ford Puma Rally1	Driver, Co-driver, Manufacturer	P
16	(France) Adrien Fourmaux	(France) Alexandre Coria	(United Kingdom) M-Sport Ford WRT	Ford Puma Rally1	Driver, Co-driver, Manufacturer	P
17	(France) Sébastien Ogier	(France) Vincent Landais	(Japan) Toyota Gazoo Racing WRT	Toyota GR Yaris Rally1	Driver, Co-driver, Manufacturer	P
18	(Japan) Takamoto Katsuta	(Republic of Ireland) Aaron Johnston	(Japan) Toyota Gazoo Racing WRT	Toyota GR Yaris Rally1	Driver, Co-driver, Manufacturer	P
33	(United Kingdom) Elfyn Evans	(United Kingdom) Scott Martin	(Japan) Toyota Gazoo Racing WRT	Toyota GR Yaris Rally1	Driver, Co-driver, Manufacturer	P

Rally2 entries competing in the World Rally Championship-2
No.	Driver	Co-Driver	Entrant	Car	Championship eligibility	Tyre
20	(France) Yohan Rossel	(France) Benjamin Boulloud	(Belgium) DG Sport Compétition	Citroën C3 Rally2	Driver, Co-driver, Team	P
22	(Bulgaria) Nikolay Gryazin	Konstantin Aleksandrov (Note: Konstantin Aleksandrov is Russian, but he competes as a neutral competitor using the ANA flag as Russian national emblems were banned by the association due to the Russian invasion of Ukraine.)	(Belgium) DG Sport Compétition	Citroën C3 Rally2	Team	P
23	(France) Nicolas Ciamin	(France) Yannick Roche	(France) Nicolas Ciamin	Hyundai i20 N Rally2	Challenger Driver, Challenger Co-driver	P
24	(Spain) Pepe López	(Spain) David Vázquez Liste	(Spain) Pepe López	Škoda Fabia RS Rally2	Challenger Driver, Challenger Co-driver	P
25	(Finland) Sami Pajari	(Finland) Enni Mälkönen	(Finland) Printsport	Toyota GR Yaris Rally2	Challenger Driver, Challenger Co-driver	P
26	(Finland) Lauri Joona	(Finland) Janni Hussi	(Finland) Lauri Joona	Škoda Fabia RS Rally2	Challenger Driver, Challenger Co-driver	P
27	(Estonia) Georg Linnamäe	(United Kingdom) James Morgan	(Estonia) Georg Linnamäe	Toyota GR Yaris Rally2	Challenger Driver, Challenger Co-driver	P
28	(Poland) Kajetan Kajetanowicz	(Poland) Maciej Szczepaniak	(Poland) Kajetan Kajetanowicz	Škoda Fabia RS Rally2	Challenger Driver, Challenger Co-driver	P
29	(Finland) Roope Korhonen	(Finland) Anssi Viinikka	(Finland) Roope Korhonen	Toyota GR Yaris Rally2	Challenger Driver, Challenger Co-driver	P
30	(Finland) Emil Lindholm	(Finland) Reeta Hämäläinen	(Finland) Emil Lindholm	Hyundai i20 N Rally2	Driver, Co-driver	P
31	(Spain) Jan Solans	(Spain) Rodrigo Sanjuan de Eusebio	(Spain) Jan Solans	Toyota GR Yaris Rally2	Challenger Driver, Challenger Co-driver	P
32	(Poland) Daniel Chwist	(Poland) Kamil Heller	(Poland) Daniel Chwist	Škoda Fabia RS Rally2	Challenger Driver, Challenger Co-driver	P
34	(Italy) Roberto Daprà	(Italy) Luca Guglielmetti	(Italy) Roberto Daprà	Škoda Fabia Rally2 evo	Challenger Driver, Challenger Co-driver	P
35	(Italy) Mauro Miele	(Italy) Luca Beltrame	(Italy) Mauro Miele	Škoda Fabia RS Rally2	Challenger/Masters Driver, Challenger Co-driver	P
36	(Greece) George Vassilakis	(United Kingdom) Tom Krawszik	(Greece) George Vassilakis	Ford Fiesta Rally2	Challenger/Masters Driver, Challenger Co-driver, Team	P
37	(Germany) Armin Kremer	(Germany) Ella Kremer	(Germany) Armin Kremer	Škoda Fabia RS Rally2	Challenger/Masters Driver, Challenger Co-driver	P
38	(Japan) Yuki Yamamoto	(Finland) Marko Salminen	(Japan) Toyota Gazoo Racing WRT NG	Toyota GR Yaris Rally2	Challenger Driver, Challenger Co-driver, Team	P
39	(Republic of Ireland) William Creighton	(Republic of Ireland) Liam Regan	(Republic of Ireland) Motorsport Ireland Rally Academy	Ford Fiesta Rally2	Challenger Driver, Challenger Co-driver	P
40	(France) Pierre-Louis Loubet	(France) Loris Pascaud	(Germany) Toksport WRT 2	Škoda Fabia RS Rally2	Driver, Co-driver, Team	P
41	(Finland) Teemu Suninen	(Finland) Mikko Markkula	(Finland) Teemu Suninen	Hyundai i20 N Rally2	Driver, Co-driver	P
43	(Bolivia) Marco Bulacia	(Spain) Diego Vallejo	(Bolivia) Marco Bulacia	Citroën C3 Rally2	Challenger Driver, Challenger Co-driver	P
44	(Paraguay) Fabrizio Zaldivar	(Italy) Marcelo Der Ohannesian	(Paraguay) Fabrizio Zaldivar	Škoda Fabia RS Rally2	Challenger Driver, Challenger Co-driver	P
45	(Japan) Hikaru Kogure	(Finland) Topi Matias Luhtinen	(Japan) Toyota Gazoo Racing WRT NG	Toyota GR Yaris Rally2	Challenger Driver, Challenger Co-driver, Team	P
46	(Estonia) Robert Virves	(Estonia) Aleks Lesk	(Estonia) Robert Virves	Škoda Fabia RS Rally2	Challenger Driver, Challenger Co-driver	P
47	(Republic of Ireland) Josh McErlean	(Republic of Ireland) James Fulton	(Germany) Toksport WRT 2	Škoda Fabia RS Rally2	Challenger Driver, Challenger Co-driver	P
48	(Czech Republic) Martin Prokop	(Czech Republic) Michal Ernst	(Czech Republic) Martin Prokop	Škoda Fabia RS Rally2	Challenger Driver, Challenger Co-driver	P
49	(Italy) Simone Romagna	(Italy) Dino Lamonato	(Italy) Simone Romagna	Škoda Fabia Rally2 evo	Challenger Driver, Challenger Co-driver	P
50	(Italy) Gianmarco Donetto	(Switzerland) Marco Menchini	(Italy) Gianmarco Donetto	Škoda Fabia R5	Challenger Driver, Challenger Co-driver	P
51	(Mexico) Alejandro Mauro Sánchez	(Spain) Adrián Pérez Fernández	(Mexico) Alejandro Mauro Sánchez	Škoda Fabia RS Rally2	Challenger Driver, Challenger Co-driver	P
52	(Mexico) Miguel Granados	(Spain) Marc Martí	(Mexico) Miguel Granados	Škoda Fabia RS Rally2	Challenger/Masters Driver, Challenger/Masters Co-driver	P
53	(France) Pierre Lafay	(France) Charlyne Quartini	(France) Pierre Lafay	Citroën C3 Rally2	Challenger/Masters Driver, Challenger Co-driver	P
54	(Mexico) Ricardo Triviño	(Spain) Diego Fuentes Vega	(Mexico) Ricardo Triviño	Škoda Fabia RS Rally2	Challenger/Masters Driver, Challenger Co-driver	P
55	(Spain) Daniel Alonso Villarón	(Spain) Alejandro López	(Spain) Past Racing	Ford Fiesta Rally2	Challenger/Masters Driver, Challenger Co-driver	P
56	(France) Jean-Michel Raoux	(France) Isabelle Galmiche	(France) Jean-Michel Raoux	Toyota GR Yaris Rally2	Challenger/Masters Driver, Challenger/Masters Co-driver	P
57	(Italy) Luca Hoelbling	(Italy) Mauro Grassi	(Italy) Luca Hoelbling	Škoda Fabia Rally2 evo	Challenger Driver, Challenger Co-driver	P
58	(Italy) Enrico Brazzoli	(Italy) Martina Musiari	(Italy) Enrico Brazzoli	Škoda Fabia Rally2 evo	Challenger/Masters Driver, Challenger Co-driver	P
59	(Turkey) Uğur Soylu	(Turkey) Sener Guray	(Turkey) Uğur Soylu	Škoda Fabia RS Rally2	Challenger/Masters Driver, Challenger Co-driver	P
60	(Italy) Christian Tiramani	(Italy) Fabio Grimaldi	(Italy) Christian Tiramani	Škoda Fabia Rally2 evo	Challenger/Masters Driver, Challenger Co-driver	P
61	(Belgium) Maxime Potty	(France) Jules Escartefigue	(Belgium) Maxime Potty	Škoda Fabia Rally2 evo	Challenger/Masters Driver, Challenger Co-driver	P
62	(Italy) Giuseppe Pozzo	(Italy) Pier Paolo Cottu	(Italy) Giuseppe Pozzo	Škoda Fabia Rally2 evo	Challenger/Masters Driver, Challenger Co-driver	P
63	(Italy) Carlo Covi	(Italy) Simone Angi	(Italy) Carlo Covi	Škoda Fabia Rally2 evo	Challenger/Masters Driver, Challenger Co-driver	P

Rally3 entries competing in the World Rally Championship-3 and/or the Junior World Rally Championship
No.	Driver	Co-Driver	Entrant	Car	Class eligibility	Tyre
64	(France) Ghjuvanni Rossi	(France) Kylian Sarmezan	(France) Ghjuvanni Rossi	Renault Clio Rally3	WRC-3	P
65	(France) Mattéo Chatillon	(France) Maxence Cornuau	(France) Mattéo Chatillon	Renault Clio Rally3	WRC-3	P
66	(Peru) Eduardo Castro	(Chile) Javiera Roman	(Peru) Eduardo Castro	Ford Fiesta Rally3	WRC-3	P
67	(France) Tom Pieri	(France) Alexis Maillefert	(France) Tom Pieri	Renault Clio Rally3	WRC-3	P
68	(Croatia) Slaven Šekuljica	(Croatia) Damir Petrović	(Croatia) Slaven Šekuljica	Ford Fiesta Rally3	WRC-3	P
70	(Estonia) Romet Jürgenson	(Estonia) Siim Oja	FIA Rally Star	Ford Fiesta Rally3	WRC-3, Junior WRC	P
71	(Australia) Taylor Gill	(Australia) Daniel Brkic	FIA Rally Star	Ford Fiesta Rally3	WRC-3, Junior WRC	P
72	(Romania) Norbert Maior	(Romania) Francesca Maria Maior	(Romania) Norbert Maior	Ford Fiesta Rally3	WRC-3, Junior WRC	P
73	(Republic of Ireland) Eamonn Kelly	(Republic of Ireland) Conor Mohan	(Republic of Ireland) Motorsport Ireland Rally Academy	Ford Fiesta Rally3	WRC-3, Junior WRC	P
74	(Spain) Raúl Hernández	(Spain) José Murado González	(Spain) Raúl Hernández	Ford Fiesta Rally3	WRC-3, Junior WRC	P
75	(Bolivia) Bruno Bulacia	(Brazil) Gabriel Morales	(Bolivia) Bruno Bulacia	Ford Fiesta Rally3	WRC-3, Junior WRC	P
76	(Belgium) Tom Rensonnet	(France) Manon Deliot	(Belgium) RACB National Team	Ford Fiesta Rally3	WRC-3, Junior WRC	P
77	(Paraguay) Diego Dominguez Jr.	(Spain) Rogelio Peñate	(Paraguay) Diego Dominguez Jr.	Ford Fiesta Rally3	WRC-3, Junior WRC	P
78	(Chile) Gerardo V. Rosselot	(Argentina) Marcelo Brizio	(Chile) Gerardo V. Rosselot	Ford Fiesta Rally3	Junior WRC	P
79	(Peru) Jose Abito Caparo	(Spain) Esther Gutiérrez Porras	FIA Rally Star	Ford Fiesta Rally3	WRC-3, Junior WRC	P
80	(South Africa) Max Smart	(United Kingdom) Cameron Fair	FIA Rally Star	Ford Fiesta Rally3	WRC-3, Junior WRC	P
81	(Kazakhstan) Petr Borodin	(Kazakhstan) Roman Cheprasov	(Kazakhstan) ASP Racing	Ford Fiesta Rally3	WRC-3, Junior WRC	P
82	(Poland) Jakub Matulka	(Poland) Daniel Dymurski	(Poland) Jakub Matulka	Ford Fiesta Rally3	WRC-3, Junior WRC	P
83	(Turkey) Ali Türkkan	(Turkey) Burak Erdener	(Turkey) Castrol Ford Team Türkiye	Ford Fiesta Rally3	WRC-3, Junior WRC	P
84	(Germany) Fabio Schwarz	(Austria) Bernhard Ettel	(Germany) Armin Schwarz Driving Experience	Ford Fiesta Rally3	WRC-3, Junior WRC	P
85	(Bolivia) Nataniel Bruun	(Argentina) Pablo Olmos	(Bolivia) Nataniel Bruun	Ford Fiesta Rally3	WRC-3, Junior WRC	P
86	(Oman) Abdullah Al-Rawahi	(United Kingdom) Ross Whittock	(Oman) Abdullah Al-Rawahi	Ford Fiesta Rally3	Junior WRC	P
87	(Peru) Andre Martinez	(Argentina) Fernando Mussano	(Peru) Andre Martinez	Ford Fiesta Rally3	Junior WRC	P

Other major entries
No.	Driver	Co-Driver	Entrant	Car	Tyre
21	(Sweden) Oliver Solberg	(United Kingdom) Elliott Edmondson	(Germany) Toksport WRT	Škoda Fabia RS Rally2	P

=== Itinerary ===
All dates and times are CEST (UTC+2).

Date	No.	Time span	Stage name	Distance
31 May	—	After 8:01	Ittiri [Shakedown]	2.08 km
31 May		After 13:30	Opening ceremony, Alghero	—N/a
31 May	SS1	After 14:33	Osilo – Tergu 1	25.65 km
31 May	SS2	After 15:33	Sedini – Castelsardo 1	13.26 km
31 May		16:00 – 16:40	Regroup, Castelsardo	—N/a
31 May	SS3	After 17:33	Osilo – Tergu 2	25.65 km
31 May	SS4	After 18:35	Sedini – Castelsardo 2	13.26 km
31 May		20:25 – 21:10	Flexi service A, Alghero	—N/a
1 June	SS5	After 7:41	Tempio Pausania 1	12.03 km
1 June	SS6	After 8:49	Tula 1	22.61 km
1 June		10:08 – 10:33	Regroup, Tempio Pausania	—N/a
1 June	SS7	After 10:41	Tempio Pausania 2	12.03 km
1 June	SS8	After 11:49	Tula 2	22.61 km
1 June		13:17 – 13:32	Regroup, Pattada	—N/a
1 June		13:32 – 13:47	Tyre fitting zone, Pattada	—N/a
1 June	SS9	After 14:05	Monte Lerno – Monti di Ala 1	25.33 km
1 June	SS10	After 15:05	Coiluna – Loelle 1	14.53 km
1 June		15:45 – 16:35	Regroup, Buddusò	—N/a
1 June	SS11	After 17:05	Monte Lerno – Monti di Ala 2	25.33 km
1 June	SS12	After 18:05	Coiluna – Loelle 2	14.53 km
1 June		20:37 – 21:22	Flexi service B, Alghero	—N/a
2 June	SS13	After 8:00	Cala Flumini 1	12.55 km
2 June		8:26 – 8:56	Regroup, Palmadula	—N/a
2 June	SS14	After 9:05	Sassari – Argentiera 1	7.10 km
2 June		9:59 – 10:24	Regroup, Porto Torres	—N/a
2 June	SS15	After 11:00	Cala Flumini 2	12.55 km
2 June		11:26 – 12:06	Regroup, Palmadula	—N/a
2 June	SS16	After 12:05	Sassari – Argentiera 2 [Power Stage]	7.10 km
2 June		13:15 – 14:15	Finish, Alghero	—N/a
2 June		After 15:30	Podium ceremony, Alghero	—N/a

== Report ==
=== WRC Rally1 ===
==== Classification ====
Position		No.	Driver	Co-driver	Entrant	Car	Time	Difference	Points			
Event	Class	No.	Driver	Co-driver	Entrant	Car	Time	Difference	SAT	SUN	WPS	Total
1	1	8	Ott Tänak	Martin Järveoja	Hyundai Shell Mobis WRT	Hyundai i20 N Rally1	3:06:05.6	0.0	15	6	4	25
2	2	17	Sébastien Ogier	Vincent Landais	Toyota Gazoo Racing WRT	Toyota GR Yaris Rally1	3:06:05.8	+0.2	18	4	0	22
3	3	6	Dani Sordo	Cándido Carrera	Hyundai Shell Mobis WRT	Hyundai i20 N Rally1	3:08:31.4	+2:25.8	13	3	0	16
4	4	33	Elfyn Evans	Scott Martin	Toyota Gazoo Racing WRT	Toyota GR Yaris Rally1	3:08:43.4	+2:37.8	10	5	3	18
5	5	13	Grégoire Munster	Louis Louka	M-Sport Ford WRT	Ford Puma Rally1	3:12:48.5	+6:42.9	8	0	0	8
15	6	16	Adrien Fourmaux	Alexandre Coria	M-Sport Ford WRT	Ford Puma Rally1	3:22:49.0	+16:43.4	0	1	2	3
35	7	18	Takamoto Katsuta	Aaron Johnston	Toyota Gazoo Racing WRT	Toyota GR Yaris Rally1	3:47:33.7	+41:28.1	0	2	1	3
41	8	11	Thierry Neuville	Martijn Wydaeghe	Hyundai Shell Mobis WRT	Hyundai i20 N Rally1	3:56:18.2	+50:12.6	0	7	5	12

==== Special stages ====
Stage	Winners	Car	Time	Class leaders
SD	Neuville / Wydaeghe	Hyundai i20 N Rally1	2:13.7	—N/a
SS1	Ogier / Landais	Toyota GR Yaris Rally1	17:18.6	Ogier / Landais
SS2	Tänak / Järveoja	Hyundai i20 N Rally1	9:57.9	Ogier / Landais
SS3	Ogier / Landais	Toyota GR Yaris Rally1	16:43.9	Ogier / Landais
SS4	Neuville / Wydaeghe	Hyundai i20 N Rally1	9:32.9	Ogier / Landais
SS5	Tänak / Järveoja	Hyundai i20 N Rally1	9:52.1	Tänak / Järveoja
SS6	Ogier / Landais	Toyota GR Yaris Rally1	19:03.7	Ogier / Landais
SS7	Neuville / Wydaeghe	Hyundai i20 N Rally1	9:37.5	Tänak / Järveoja
SS8	Tänak / Järveoja	Hyundai i20 N Rally1	18:46.4	Tänak / Järveoja
SS9	Ogier / Landais	Toyota GR Yaris Rally1	15:13.1	Ogier / Landais
SS10	Ogier / Landais	Toyota GR Yaris Rally1	9:11.3	Ogier / Landais
SS11	Ogier / Landais	Toyota GR Yaris Rally1	15:01.6	Ogier / Landais
SS12	Evans / Martin	Toyota GR Yaris Rally1	9:03.6	Ogier / Landais
SS13	Neuville / Wydaeghe	Hyundai i20 N Rally1	8:06.5	Ogier / Landais
SS14	Neuville / Wydaeghe	Hyundai i20 N Rally1	5:01.4	Ogier / Landais
SS15	Tänak / Järveoja	Hyundai i20 N Rally1	7:54.6	Ogier / Landais
SS16	Neuville / Wydaeghe	Hyundai i20 N Rally1	4:55.0	Tänak / Järveoja

==== Championship standings ====
Pos.	Drivers' championships			Co-drivers' championships			Manufacturers' championships		
Pos.	Move	Driver	Points	Move	Co-driver	Points	Move	Manufacturer	Points
1		Thierry Neuville	122		Martijn Wydaeghe	122		Hyundai Shell Mobis WRT	269
2	1	Ott Tänak	104	1	Martin Järveoja	104		Toyota Gazoo Racing WRT	256
3	1	Elfyn Evans	104	1	Scott Martin	104		M-Sport Ford WRT	131
4	1	Sébastien Ogier	92	1	Vincent Landais	92			
5	1	Adrien Fourmaux	74	1	Alexandre Coria	74			

=== WRC-2 Rally2 ===
==== Classification ====
Position		No.	Driver	Co-driver	Entrant	Car	Time	Difference	Points	
Event	Class	No.	Driver	Co-driver	Entrant	Car	Time	Difference	Class	Event
6	1	25	Sami Pajari	Enni Mälkönen	Printsport	Toyota GR Yaris Rally2	3:13:19.0	0.0	25	6
7	2	20	Yohan Rossel	Benjamin Boulloud	DG Sport Compétition	Citroën C3 Rally2	3:13:51.3	+32.3	18	4
8	3	31	Jan Solans	Rodrigo Sanjuan de Eusebio	Jan Solans	Toyota GR Yaris Rally2	3:13:58.3	+39.3	15	3
9	4	48	Martin Prokop	Michal Ernst	Martin Prokop	Škoda Fabia RS Rally2	3:16:11.0	+2:52.0	12	1
10	5	28	Kajetan Kajetanowicz	Maciej Szczepaniak	Kajetan Kajetanowicz	Škoda Fabia RS Rally2	3:16:14.9	+2:55.9	10	2
11	6	46	Robert Virves	Aleks Lesk	Robert Virves	Škoda Fabia RS Rally2	3:16:37.5	+3:18.5	8	0
12	7	26	Lauri Joona	Janni Hussi	Lauri Joona	Škoda Fabia RS Rally2	3:16:50.3	+3:31.3	6	0
13	8	47	Josh McErlean	James Fulton	Toksport WRT 2	Škoda Fabia RS Rally2	3:17:35.0	+4:16.0	4	0
14	9	34	Roberto Daprà	Luca Guglielmetti	Roberto Daprà	Škoda Fabia Rally2 evo	3:21:09.0	+7:50.0	2	0
16	10	37	Armin Kremer	Ella Kremer	Armin Kremer	Škoda Fabia RS Rally2	3:26:56.9	+13:37.9	1	0
18	11	53	Pierre Lafay	Charlyne Quartini	Pierre Lafay	Citroën C3 Rally2	3:31:30.3	+18:11.3	0	0
19	12	51	Alejandro Mauro Sánchez	Adrián Pérez Fernández	Alejandro Mauro Sánchez	Škoda Fabia RS Rally2	3:31:36.1	+18:17.1	0	0
22	13	57	Luca Hoelbling	Mauro Grassi	Luca Hoelbling	Škoda Fabia Rally2 evo	3:34:03.9	+20:44.9	0	0
25	14	32	Daniel Chwist	Kamil Heller	Daniel Chwist	Škoda Fabia RS Rally2	3:34:16.3	+20:57.3	0	0
26	15	54	Ricardo Triviño	Diego Fuentes Vega	Ricardo Triviño	Škoda Fabia RS Rally2	3:36:49.5	+23:30.5	0	0
27	16	52	Miguel Granados	Marc Martí	Miguel Granados	Škoda Fabia RS Rally2	3:38:39.1	+25:20.1	0	0
31	17	59	Uğur Soylu	Sener Guray	Uğur Soylu	Škoda Fabia RS Rally2	3:43:28.1	+30:09.1	0	0
34	18	50	Gianmarco Donetto	Marco Menchini	Gianmarco Donetto	Škoda Fabia R5	3:46:07.5	+32:48.5	0	0
38	19	35	Mauro Miele	Luca Beltrame	Mauro Miele	Škoda Fabia RS Rally2	3:49:36.4	+36:17.4	0	0
39	20	62	Giuseppe Pozzo	Pier Paolo Cottu	Giuseppe Pozzo	Škoda Fabia Rally2 evo	3:51:35.7	+38:16.7	0	0
42	21	44	Fabrizio Zaldivar	Marcelo Der Ohannesian	Fabrizio Zaldivar	Škoda Fabia RS Rally2	3:56:46.0	+43:27.0	0	0
43	22	36	George Vassilakis	Tom Krawszik	George Vassilakis	Ford Fiesta Rally2	3:58:26.6	+45:07.6	0	0
45	23	63	Carlo Covi	Simone Angi	Carlo Covi	Škoda Fabia Rally2 evo	4:04:27.5	+51:08.5	0	0
46	24	30	Emil Lindholm	Reeta Hämäläinen	Emil Lindholm	Hyundai i20 N Rally2	4:07:42.9	+54:23.9	0	0
49	25	61	Maxime Potty	Jules Escartefigue	Maxime Potty	Škoda Fabia Rally2 evo	4:12:12.9	+58:53.9	0	0
51	26	43	Marco Bulacia	Diego Vallejo	Marco Bulacia	Citroën C3 Rally2	4:15:24.2	+1:02:05.2	0	0
52	27	27	Georg Linnamäe	James Morgan	Georg Linnamäe	Toyota GR Yaris Rally2	4:16:09.4	+1:02:50.4	0	0
54	28	39	William Creighton	Liam Regan	Motorsport Ireland Rally Academy	Ford Fiesta Rally2	4:22:22.2	+1:09:03.2	0	0
57	29	58	Enrico Brazzoli	Martina Musiari	Enrico Brazzoli	Škoda Fabia Rally2 evo	4:28:20.0	+1:15:01.0	0	0
59	30	23	Nicolas Ciamin	Yannick Roche	Nicolas Ciamin	Hyundai i20 N Rally2	4:35:45.0	+1:22:26.0	0	0
60	31	38	Yuki Yamamoto	Marko Salminen	Toyota Gazoo Racing WRT NG	Toyota GR Yaris Rally2	4:36:04.3	+1:22:45.3	0	0
Retired SS15		56	Jean-Michel Raoux	Isabelle Galmiche	Jean-Michel Raoux	Toyota GR Yaris Rally2	Withdrawn		0	0
Retired SS13		41	Teemu Suninen	Mikko Markkula	Teemu Suninen	Hyundai i20 N Rally2	Withdrawn		0	0
Retired SS9		40	Pierre-Louis Loubet	Loris Pascaud	Toksport WRT 2	Škoda Fabia RS Rally2	Mechanical		0	0
Retired SS5		45	Hikaru Kogure	Topi Matias Luhtinen	Toyota Gazoo Racing WRT NG	Toyota GR Yaris Rally2	Accident		0	0
Retired SS3		49	Simone Romagna	Dino Lamonato	Simone Romagna	Škoda Fabia Rally2 evo	Gearbox		0	0

==== Special stages ====
Overall
Stage	Winners	Car	Time	Class leaders
SD	Loubet / Pascaud	Škoda Fabia RS Rally2	2:15.6	—N/a
SS1	Pajari / Mälkönen	Toyota GR Yaris Rally2	17:38.6	Pajari / Mälkönen
SS2	Loubet / Pascaud	Škoda Fabia RS Rally2	10:06.8	Loubet / Pascaud
SS3	Linnamäe / Morgan	Toyota GR Yaris Rally2	17:23.0	Pajari / Mälkönen
SS4	Pajari / Mälkönen	Toyota GR Yaris Rally2	10:00.0	Pajari / Mälkönen
SS5	Rossel / Dunand	Citroën C3 Rally2	10:02.0	Pajari / Mälkönen
SS6	Rossel / Dunand	Citroën C3 Rally2	19:25.7	Pajari / Mälkönen
SS7	Rossel / Dunand	Citroën C3 Rally2	9:49.8	Pajari / Mälkönen
SS8	Rossel / Dunand	Citroën C3 Rally2	19:16.7	Pajari / Mälkönen
SS9	Rossel / Dunand	Citroën C3 Rally2	15:48.7	Pajari / Mälkönen
SS10	Rossel / Dunand	Citroën C3 Rally2	9:27.8	Pajari / Mälkönen
SS11	Rossel / Dunand	Citroën C3 Rally2	15:35.3	Pajari / Mälkönen
SS12	Rossel / Dunand	Citroën C3 Rally2	9:20.6	Pajari / Mälkönen
SS13	Solans / Sanjuan de Eusebio	Toyota GR Yaris Rally2	8:33.4	Pajari / Mälkönen
SS14	Solans / Sanjuan de Eusebio	Toyota GR Yaris Rally2	5:19.3	Pajari / Mälkönen
SS15	Solans / Sanjuan de Eusebio	Toyota GR Yaris Rally2	8:18.6	Pajari / Mälkönen
SS16	Rossel / Dunand	Citroën C3 Rally2	5:15.4	Pajari / Mälkönen

Challenger
Stage	Winners	Car	Time	Class leaders
SD	Prokop / Ernst	Škoda Fabia RS Rally2	2:16.8	—N/a
SS1	Pajari / Mälkönen	Toyota GR Yaris Rally2	17:38.6	Pajari / Mälkönen
SS2	Bulacia / Vallejo	Citroën C3 Rally2	10:14.5	Pajari / Mälkönen
SS3	Linnamäe / Morgan	Toyota GR Yaris Rally2	17:23.0	Pajari / Mälkönen
SS4	Pajari / Mälkönen	Toyota GR Yaris Rally2	10:00.0	Pajari / Mälkönen
SS5	Pajari / Mälkönen	Toyota GR Yaris Rally2	10:06.6	Pajari / Mälkönen
SS6	Pajari / Mälkönen	Toyota GR Yaris Rally2	19:43.0	Pajari / Mälkönen
SS7	Pajari / Mälkönen	Toyota GR Yaris Rally2	9:58.5	Pajari / Mälkönen
SS8	Pajari / Mälkönen	Toyota GR Yaris Rally2	19:30.6	Pajari / Mälkönen
SS9	McErlean / Fulton	Škoda Fabia RS Rally2	15:57.5	Pajari / Mälkönen
SS10	Pajari / Mälkönen	Toyota GR Yaris Rally2	9:36.8	Pajari / Mälkönen
SS11	Pajari / Mälkönen	Toyota GR Yaris Rally2	15:40.7	Pajari / Mälkönen
SS12	Solans / Sanjuan de Eusebio	Toyota GR Yaris Rally2	9:27.2	Pajari / Mälkönen
SS13	Solans / Sanjuan de Eusebio	Toyota GR Yaris Rally2	8:33.4	Pajari / Mälkönen
SS14	Solans / Sanjuan de Eusebio	Toyota GR Yaris Rally2	5:19.3	Pajari / Mälkönen
SS15	Solans / Sanjuan de Eusebio	Toyota GR Yaris Rally2	8:18.6	Pajari / Mälkönen
SS16	Solans / Sanjuan de Eusebio	Toyota GR Yaris Rally2	5:18.6	Pajari / Mälkönen

==== Championship standings ====
Pos.	Open Drivers' championships			Open Co-drivers' championships			Teams' championships			Challenger Drivers' championships			Challenger Co-drivers' championships		
Pos.	Move	Driver	Points	Move	Co-driver	Points	Move	Manufacturer	Points	Move	Manufacturer	Points	Move	Driver	Points
1		Yohan Rossel	71		Arnaud Dunand	53		DG Sport Compétition	169	3	Jan Solans	56	3	Rodrigo Sanjuan de Eusebio	56
2	3	Jan Solans	48	3	Rodrigo Sanjuan de Eusebio	48	1	Toyota Gazoo Racing WRT NG	73	4	Sami Pajari	50	4	Enni Mälkönen	50
3	1	Oliver Solberg	43	1	Elliott Edmondson	43	1	Toksport WRT	70	2	Nicolas Ciamin	48	2	Yannick Roche	48
4	7	Sami Pajari	43	7	Enni Mälkönen	43	New entry	Toksport WRT 2	18	2	Pepe López	43	2	David Vázquez Liste	43
5	2	Nikolay Gryazin	40	2	Konstantin Aleksandrov	40				2	Nikolay Gryazin	43	2	Konstantin Aleksandrov	43

=== WRC-3 Rally3 ===
==== Classification ====
Position		No.	Driver	Co-driver	Entrant	Car	Time	Difference	Points
Event	Class	No.	Driver	Co-driver	Entrant	Car	Time	Difference	Points
20	1	77	Diego Dominguez Jr.	Rogelio Peñate	Diego Dominguez Jr.	Ford Fiesta Rally3	3:33:09.3	0.0	25
21	2	83	Ali Türkkan	Burak Erdener	Castrol Ford Team Türkiye	Ford Fiesta Rally3	3:33:56.8	+47.5	18
23	3	80	Max Smart	Cameron Fair	FIA Rally Star	Ford Fiesta Rally3	3:34:10.0	+1:00.7	15
24	4	81	Petr Borodin	Roman Cheprasov	ASP Racing	Ford Fiesta Rally3	3:34:14.0	+1:04.7	12
28	5	72	Norbert Maior	Francesca Maria Maior	Norbert Maior	Ford Fiesta Rally3	3:39:06.9	+5:57.6	10
29	6	71	Taylor Gill	Daniel Brkic	FIA Rally Star	Ford Fiesta Rally3	3:40:47.6	+7:38.3	8
32	7	85	Nataniel Bruun	Pablo Olmos	Nataniel Bruun	Ford Fiesta Rally3	3:43:50.0	+10:40.7	6
37	8	75	Bruno Bulacia	Gabriel Morales	Bruno Bulacia	Ford Fiesta Rally3	3:48:41.2	+15:31.9	4
44	9	84	Fabio Schwarz	Bernhard Ettel	Armin Schwarz Driving Experience	Ford Fiesta Rally3	3:59:48.2	+26:38.9	2
48	10	76	Tom Rensonnet	Manon Deliot	RACB National Team	Ford Fiesta Rally3	4:11:20.1	+38:10.8	1
55	11	73	Eamonn Kelly	Conor Mohan	Motorsport Ireland Rally Academy	Ford Fiesta Rally3	4:25:42.0	+52:32.7	0
56	12	70	Romet Jürgenson	Siim Oja	FIA Rally Star	Ford Fiesta Rally3	4:27:38.5	+54:29.2	0
58	13	79	Jose Abito Caparó	Esther Gutiérrez Porras	FIA Rally Star	Ford Fiesta Rally3	4:31:19.5	+58:10.2	0
61	14	64	Ghjuvanni Rossi	Kylian Sarmezan	Ghjuvanni Rossi	Renault Clio Rally3	4:40:40.9	+1:07:31.6	0
62	15	65	Mattéo Chatillon	Maxence Cornuau	Mattéo Chatillon	Renault Clio Rally3	4:51:18.6	+1:18:09.3	0
64	16	66	Eduardo Castro	Javiera Roman	Eduardo Castro	Ford Fiesta Rally3	5:09:06.9	+1:35:57.6	0
Retired SS13		74	Raúl Hernández	José Murado González	Raúl Hernández	Ford Fiesta Rally3	Withdrawn		0
Retired SS1		67	Tom Pieri	Alexis Maillefert	Tom Pieri	Renault Clio Rally3	Did not start		0

==== Special stages ====
Stage	Winners	Car	Time	Class leaders
SD	Rossi / Sarmezan	Renault Clio Rally3	2:18.8	—N/a
SS1	Jürgenson / Oja	Ford Fiesta Rally3	18:51.8	Jürgenson / Oja
SS2	Bulacia / Morales	Ford Fiesta Rally3	10:46.5	Jürgenson / Oja
SS3	Bulacia / Morales	Ford Fiesta Rally3	18:36.5	Jürgenson / Oja
SS4	Bulacia / Morales	Ford Fiesta Rally3	10:42.4	Jürgenson / Oja
SS5	Jürgenson / Oja	Ford Fiesta Rally3	10:56.2	Jürgenson / Oja
SS6	Bulacia / Morales	Ford Fiesta Rally3	20:50.8	Bulacia / Morales
SS7	Gill / Brkic	Ford Fiesta Rally3	10:53.5	Bulacia / Morales
SS8	Hernández / Murado González; Dominguez Jr. / Peñate	Ford Fiesta Rally3; Ford Fiesta Rally3	21:15.0	Bulacia / Morales
SS9	Hernández / Murado González	Ford Fiesta Rally3	16:54.6	Bulacia / Morales
SS10	Türkkan / Erdener	Ford Fiesta Rally3	10:15.4	Bulacia / Morales
SS11	Rensonnet / Deliot	Ford Fiesta Rally3	17:03.0	Türkkan / Erdener
SS12	Rensonnet / Deliot	Ford Fiesta Rally3	10:10.9	Dominguez Jr. / Peñate
SS13	Jürgenson / Oja	Ford Fiesta Rally3	9:05.4	Dominguez Jr. / Peñate
SS14	Gill / Brkic	Ford Fiesta Rally3	5:47.3	Dominguez Jr. / Peñate
SS15	Jürgenson / Oja	Ford Fiesta Rally3	8:53.3	Dominguez Jr. / Peñate
SS16	Jürgenson / Oja	Ford Fiesta Rally3	5:49.0	Dominguez Jr. / Peñate

==== Championship standings ====
Pos.	Drivers' championships			Co-drivers' championships		
Pos.	Move	Driver	Points	Move	Co-driver	Points
1	4	Diego Dominguez Jr.	50	4	Rogelio Peñate	50
2	1	Romet Jürgenson	43	1	Siim Oja	43
3	1	Jan Černý	37	1	Ondřej Krajča	37
4	1	Mattéo Chatillon	36	1	Maxence Cornuau	36
5	1	Ghjuvanni Rossi	28	1	Kylian Sarmezan	28

=== J-WRC Rally3 ===
==== Classification ====
Position		No.	Driver	Co-driver	Entrant	Car	Time	Difference	Points	
Event	Class	No.	Driver	Co-driver	Entrant	Car	Time	Difference	Class	Stage
20	1	77	Diego Dominguez Jr.	Rogelio Peñate	Diego Dominguez Jr.	Ford Fiesta Rally3	3:33:09.3	0.0	25	0
21	2	83	Ali Türkkan	Burak Erdener	Castrol Ford Team Türkiye	Ford Fiesta Rally3	3:33:56.8	+47.5	18	1
23	3	80	Max Smart	Cameron Fair	FIA Rally Star	Ford Fiesta Rally3	3:34:10.0	+1:00.7	15	0
24	4	81	Petr Borodin	Roman Cheprasov	ASP Racing	Ford Fiesta Rally3	3:34:14.0	+1:04.7	12	0
28	5	72	Norbert Maior	Francesca Maria Maior	Norbert Maior	Ford Fiesta Rally3	3:39:06.9	+5:57.6	10	0
29	6	71	Taylor Gill	Daniel Brkic	FIA Rally Star	Ford Fiesta Rally3	3:40:47.6	+7:38.3	8	1
30	7	78	Gerardo V. Rosselot	Marcelo Brizio	Gerardo V. Rosselot	Ford Fiesta Rally3	3:42:46.7	+9:37.4	6	0
32	8	85	Nataniel Bruun	Pablo Olmos	Nataniel Bruun	Ford Fiesta Rally3	3:43:50.0	+10:40.7	4	0
37	9	75	Bruno Bulacia	Gabriel Morales	Bruno Bulacia	Ford Fiesta Rally3	3:48:41.2	+15:31.9	2	4
40	10	87	Andre Martinez	Fernando Mussano	Andre Martinez	Ford Fiesta Rally3	3:51:57.2	+18:47.9	1	0
44	11	84	Fabio Schwarz	Bernhard Ettel	Armin Schwarz Driving Experience	Ford Fiesta Rally3	3:59:48.2	+26:38.9	0	0
48	12	76	Tom Rensonnet	Manon Deliot	RACB National Team	Ford Fiesta Rally3	4:11:20.1	+38:10.8	0	2
55	13	73	Eamonn Kelly	Conor Mohan	Motorsport Ireland Rally Academy	Ford Fiesta Rally3	4:25:42.0	+52:32.7	0	0
56	14	70	Romet Jürgenson	Siim Oja	FIA Rally Star	Ford Fiesta Rally3	4:27:38.5	+54:29.2	0	5
58	15	79	Jose Abito Caparó	Esther Gutiérrez Porras	FIA Rally Star	Ford Fiesta Rally3	4:31:19.5	+58:10.2	0	0
Retired SS13		74	Raúl Hernández	José Murado González	Raúl Hernández	Ford Fiesta Rally3	Withdrawn		0	1
Retired SS7		86	Abdullah Al-Rawahi	Ross Whittock	Abdullah Al-Rawahi	Ford Fiesta Rally3	Mechanical		0	0

==== Special stages ====
Stage	Winners	Car	Time	Class leaders
SD	Dominguez Jr.	Ford Fiesta Rally3	2:19.7	—N/a
SS1	Jürgenson / Oja	Ford Fiesta Rally3	18:51.8	Jürgenson / Oja
SS2	Bulacia / Morales	Ford Fiesta Rally3	10:46.5	Jürgenson / Oja
SS3	Bulacia / Morales	Ford Fiesta Rally3	18:36.5	Jürgenson / Oja
SS4	Bulacia / Morales	Ford Fiesta Rally3	10:42.4	Jürgenson / Oja
SS5	Jürgenson / Oja	Ford Fiesta Rally3	10:56.2	Jürgenson / Oja
SS6	Bulacia / Morales	Ford Fiesta Rally3	20:50.8	Bulacia / Morales
SS7	Gill / Brkic	Ford Fiesta Rally3	10:53.5	Bulacia / Morales
SS8	Hernández / Murado González; Dominguez Jr. / Peñate	Ford Fiesta Rally3; Ford Fiesta Rally3	21:15.0	Bulacia / Morales
SS9	Hernández / Murado González	Ford Fiesta Rally3	16:54.6	Bulacia / Morales
SS10	Türkkan / Erdener	Ford Fiesta Rally3	10:15.4	Bulacia / Morales
SS11	Rensonnet / Deliot	Ford Fiesta Rally3	17:03.0	Türkkan / Erdener
SS12	Rensonnet / Deliot	Ford Fiesta Rally3	10:10.9	Dominguez Jr. / Peñate
SS13	Jürgenson / Oja	Ford Fiesta Rally3	9:05.4	Dominguez Jr. / Peñate
SS14	Gill / Brkic	Ford Fiesta Rally3	5:47.3	Dominguez Jr. / Peñate
SS15	Jürgenson / Oja	Ford Fiesta Rally3	8:53.3	Dominguez Jr. / Peñate
SS16	Jürgenson / Oja	Ford Fiesta Rally3	5:49.0	Dominguez Jr. / Peñate

==== Championship standings ====
Pos.	Drivers' championships			Co-drivers' championships		
Pos.	Move	Driver	Points	Move	Co-driver	Points
1		Romet Jürgenson	60		Siim Oja	60
2	8	Diego Dominguez Jr.	35	8	Rogelio Peñate	35
3		Taylor Gill	34		Daniel Brkic	34
4	2	Mille Johansson	33	2	Johan Grönvall	33
5	1	Norbert Maior	29	1	Francesca Maior	29

== Notes ==
Previous rally: 2024 Rally de Portugal	2024 FIA World Rally Championship	Next rally: 2024 Rally Poland
Previous rally: 2023 Rally Italia Sardegna	2024 Rally Italia Sardegna	Next rally: 2025 Rally Italia Sardegna
