= Party of Venetians (2010) =

Party of Venetians Partito dei Veneti
- Founded: January 2010
- Dissolved: 12 September 2010
- Merged into: Veneto State
- Ideology: Venetism; Separatism

The Party of Venetians (Italian: Partito dei Veneti, PdV) was a Venetist-separatist coalition of parties active in Veneto.

The alliance, which was formed in January 2010, after the disbandment of Veneto Freedom, was composed of five groups, which continued to be active as factions of Veneto State, since when the PdV was merged into that party:

- a group of splinters from Liga Veneta Repubblica (LVR, centrist)
- Venetians Movement (MV, no ideological affiliation)
- Venetian People's Unity (UPV, communist/socialist)
- Venetian State (SV, no ideological affiliation)
- Bellunese Autonomist Party (PAB, centrist)
- Venetian Independence (IV, liberal)
- Free Veneto (VL, centrist)

== History ==
=== Veneto Freedom ===
Talks between several Venetist parties over the formation of a united party as a reliable competitor of Liga Veneta–Lega Nord started in February 2008 during a meeting in Pastrengo, Verona and Veneto Freedom was eventually launched in November 2009.

However, as soon as in January 2010, the coalition broke up over frictions between the moderate wing led by Fabrizio Comencini and Carlo Covi, respectively leaders of LVR and Venetian Agreement, and the independentist wing led by Patrik Riondato, leader of Venetians Movement. The former wanted to endorse Antonio De Poli of the Union of the Centre for President in the 2010 regional election, a notion vehemently opposed by the independentists, and this ultimately led to the premature death of the coalition.

=== 2010 regional election ===
Subsequently to the break-up of Veneto Freedom, its independentist core broke away from the moderate wing represented by Comencini to form the PdV. Silvano Polo, a long-time ally of Comencini within LVR, left that party too in order to be the candidate of the PdV in the next regional election. Polo, who has been Mayor of San Bonifacio for two terms (1994–1998 for Liga Veneta–Lega Nord and 2004–2009 for LVR, after having left Liga Veneta in 1998), soon expoused a more independentist line than that of Veneto Freedom and called for an alliance with other Venetist parties, notably the Venetian National Party (PNV), North-East Project (PNE), North-East Union (UNE) and, hopefully, the totality of LVR.

The PNV, which had been a harsh critic of Veneto Freedom before, responded positively but set some stringent conditions, notably: that the joint-list will have the denomination "Venetian National Party", that the candidate must come from PNV ranks due to the primary election ran by the PNV, that the coalition will campaign for an independence referendum and will expouse a coherent independentist position.

On election day Polo won only 0.5% of the vote, while the PdV stopped at 0.4%.

=== Merger with the PNV ===
On 12 September 2010 the PdV was merged with the PNV to form Veneto State, a united Venetist-separatist party. Giustino Cherubin, a leading member of the Venetians Movement and the PdV, was elected president of the new party, along with PNV's Lodovico Pizzati who was elected secretary.
