= Agostino Bonalumi =

Italian painter (1935–2013)

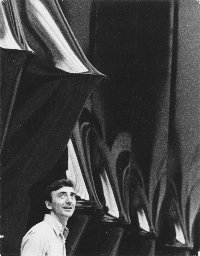
- Born: July 10, 1935; Vimercate, Kingdom of Italy
- Died: September 18, 2013 (aged 78); Desio, Italy
- Known for: Painting; sculpture

Agostino Bonalumi (10 July 1935 – 18 September 2013) was an Italian painter, draughtsman and sculptor.

== Biography ==
Bonalumi was born in Vimercate, Italy. He studied technical and mechanical drawing, and exhibited his first works at the "Premio Nazionale Città di Vimercate" (hors concours) in 1948, when he was just 13 years old.

He held his first solo show at the Galleria Totti, Milan, in 1956. In 1958 he began working with Enrico Castellani and Piero Manzoni, holding a group exhibition at the Galleria Pater, Milan, which was followed by further shows in Rome, Milan and Lausanne, the foundation of Azimuth magazine and his participation in exhibitions at the Azimut gallery.

He started developing the idea of what he would call "pittura – oggetto" (painting-object), following the idea to go beyond the canvas started by their mentor Lucio Fontana. In 1959 he held his first solo show outside Italy in Rotterdam. In 1960 he was one of the founders of the international Nouvelle École Européenne (NEE) movement in Lausanne and his solo exhibition "Agostino Bonalumi. Recent Paintings, Sculptures and Drawings" opened at the New Vision Centre Gallery in London.

Arturo Schwarz began collecting his works and, in February 1965, organised a Bonalumi exhibition in his gallery in Milan.

He had strong links with the German art scene, thanks to the interest of Udo Kultermann in his work (since 1960) and his collaboration with the Galerie M.E. Thelen in Essen.

He also had assiduous contacts and links with the international Zero movement (both in the Netherlands and Germany), documented by major exhibitions such as "Zero" in London, 1964, and the touring exhibition "ZERO Avantgarde", which began in Lucio Fontana's studio in Milan in 1965. 1965 marked the start of a long period of collaboration with Renato Cardazzo, director of the Galleria del Cavallino in Venice and the Galleria del Naviglio in Milan. He was Bonalumi's sole agent for many years and, in 1973, supervised the publication of a lengthy monograph on the artist by Edizioni del Naviglio, written by Gillo Dorfles.

In 1966 he was invited to take part in the 33rd Venice Biennale, where he exhibited a selection of his works in the same room as Paolo Scheggi, while in 1970 he had his own personal room at the 35th Venice Biennale (and a feature written on him in the catalogue by Luciano Caramel), in which he also installed some large environmental sculptures.

In 1967 he was invited to the São Paulo Biennial and the Biennial of Young Artists in Paris. This was followed by a period of study and work in northern Africa and America, where he lived for a while in New York. It was here that he held his first solo show in the United States: "Agostino Bonalumi. Painting–Constructions", presented at the Galeria Bonino in 1967.

During this period, Bonalumi embarked on his own particular course of painting and environmental sculpture, which unfolded over the decades in some fundamental stages: in 1967, Blu abitabile (Inhabitable Blue) created for "Lo spazio dell’immagine" exhibition in Foligno (and exhibited again in 1970 in the "Vitalità del negativo" show in Rome); in 1968, Grande Nero (Big Black) at the Museum am Ostwall in Dortmund; in 1979, as part of the "Pittura Ambiente" exhibition curated by Francesca Alinovi and Renato Barilli in the Palazzo Reale in Milan, Dal giallo al bianco e dal bianco al giallo (From Yellow to White and from White to Yellow). More recently, Ambiente bianco – Spazio trattenuto e spazio invaso (White Environment – Detained Space and Invaded Space), created in 2002 for the Peggy Guggenheim Collection in Venice as part of the "Temi e Variazioni" project conceived and curated by Luca Massimo Barbero.

In 1974, a retrospective of the artist's work, curated by Giulio Carlo Argan, was held in the Palazzo dei Musei in Modena. In 1980, the Regione Lombardia sponsored an exhibition in the Palazzo Te, Mantua, curated by Flavio Caroli and Gillo Dorfles: an extensive review that illustrated his entire artistic career.

In 1981 he took part, together with Piero Dorazio, Mimmo Rotella and Giuseppe Santomaso, in the "Italian Art: Four Contemporary Directions" exhibition at the Fort Lauderdale Museum of Art in Florida. In 1986 he participated in the 11th Rome Quadriennale and the 42nd Venice Biennale. Between 1986 and 1997 Bonalumi was represented exclusively by the Galleria Blu in Milan, which presented solo shows of his work in 1980, 1989, 1991, 1995 (with a monograph published by Scheiwiller as part of the Arte Moderna Italiana series, including a piece written by Vanni Scheiwiller), 2002 and 2005. A monograph by Elena Pontiggia, which documented Bonalumi's works on paper and made from paper, was also published in 1995, as part of La Scaletta editions, San Polo, Reggio Emilia.

In 1997 he began working with the Galleria Fumagalli in Bergamo, which, in 1998, held an exhibition of his works from 1957 to 1997, accompanied by a monograph by Alberto Fiz and Marco Meneguzzo.

In 1999 he was once again invited to the Rome Quadriennale and, in 2000, a solo exhibition of his opened in the Galleria Niccoli in Parma, which was accompanied by an important monograph by Luca Massimo Barbero.

In 2001 he took part in the "Materia/Niente" group show at the Fondazione Bevilacqua La Masa in Venice and, in the same year, the Accademia di San Luca presented him with the Premio Presidente della Repubblica 2001 for sculpture. To mark the occasion, a retrospective of the artist's work was held in the rooms of the Accademia, accompanied by a monograph by Achille Perilli.

In November 2003, during the six-month Italian presidency of the EU Council, he took part in the "Futuro Italiano" exhibition in the rooms of the European Parliament in Brussels. Between 2003 and 2004, the Institut Mathildenhöhe in Darmstadt dedicated an anthology exhibition to him.

He had solo shows in 2008 in the Mazzoleni Galleria d’Arte, Turin, in 2010 in the Galèrie Vedovi, Brussels, and in 2012 in the Barbara Mathes Gallery, New York. In 2011 the Museum of Modern Art in Moscow dedicated a retrospective to the artist, curated by Lea Mattarella.

In 2012 his work featured in the "Manzoni Azimut" exhibition in the Gagosian Gallery, London, devoted to the philological reconstruction of the international activities and context of the historic Milanese magazine and gallery, extensively documented in the book of the same name by Francesca Pola. In 2013, a solo show curated by Silvia Pegoraro was held at the Partners & Mucciaccia Gallery in Singapore. In the course of his career he has also completed some major projects for the stage: in 1970, he designed the scenery and costumes for the Partita ballet (score by Goffredo Petrassi, choreography by Susanna Egri) at the Teatro Romano in Verona, and in 1972 he created the scenery and costumes for Rot (score by Domenico Guaccero, choreography by Amedeo Amodio) at the Teatro dell'Opera in Rome. He also created artist's books for Edizioni Colophon, Belluno, featuring pieces written by himself and by Petrarch, Villa and Goethe. He published scherzo, io (twelve poems, Colophon, Belluno, 2000), Da te ascolto tornare le cose (with a comment by Concetto Pozzati, Book Editore, Castel Maggiore [Bologna], 2001), and Difficile cogliersi (Edizioni Il Bulino, Rome 2002). Agostino Bonalumi died in Monza on 18 September 2013. On 4 October 2013, Robilant + Voena Gallery in London presented the first retrospective specifically devoted to his work from the 1950s to the 1970s: "Agostino Bonalumi. All the Shapes of Space 1958–1976", curated by Francesca Pola, who also wrote and edited the monograph published on this occasion, and realized a video documentary including Bonalumi's last interview on his work.

== Bibliography ==
- Agostino Bonalumi, Gillo Dorfles, Edizioni del Naviglio, Milano, 1973.
- L'arte Contemporanea, da Cèzanne alle ultime tendenze, Renato Barilli, Feltrinelli, Milano, 1984.
- Storia della Pittura dal IV al XX secolo, a cura di C.L. Ragghianti, Istituto Geografico De Agostini, Novara, 1986.
- Agostino Bonalumi, Vanni Scheiwillier – Collana Arte Moderna Italiana, Milano, 1995.
- Storia dell'arte contemporanea in Italia, Renato Barilli, Bollati Boringhieri, Torino, 2007.
- Peripezie del dopoguerra nell'arte Italiana, Adachiara Zevi, Einaudi, 2005.
- All the Shapes of Space 1958–1976. Francesca Pola, Milano: ROBILANT+VOENA con Skira, 2013..
