= Veneto Freedom =

Veneto Freedom Veneto Libertà
- Founded: November 2009
- Dissolved: January 2010
- Ideology: Venetism; Separatism

Veneto Freedom (Veneto Libertà, VL) was a Venetist-separatist coalition of parties active in Veneto.

Talks between several Venetist parties over the formation of a united party as a reliable competitor of Liga Veneta–Lega Nord started in February 2008 during a meeting in Pastrengo, Verona.

The alliance, promoted by Fabrizio Comencini, Carlo Covi and Patrik Riondato, was officially launched in November 2009 by the union of six parties and groups:

- Liga Veneta Repubblica (LVR, centrist)
- Bellunese Autonomist Party (PAB, centrist)
- Venetian Agreement (IV, social-democratic)
- Venetian People's Unity (UPV, communist/socialist)
- Venetians Movement (MV, no ideological affiliation)
- Venetian State (SV, no ideological affiliation)

The coalition favored a referendum on the self-determination of Veneto in a framework of a confederal Italian state, but not secession from Italy. For this reason it was immediately criticized by the Venetian National Party, which instead proposed a referendum on the independence. In an interview Comencini stated that VL has several friends within Liga Veneta–Lega Nord (of which he was the leader until 1998), but that his group rejected the idea of Padania altogether. The main components of the coalition were centrist or centre-left, with the notable exception of the communists of UPV.

Comencini and Covi wanted to endorse Antonio De Poli of the Union of Christian and Centre Democrats for President in the 2010 regional election and this ultimately led to the premature death of the coalition. In January 2010 the independentist core of Veneto Freedom broke away from the moderate wing represented by Comencini and formed the Party of the Venetians (PdV). Silvano Polo, a long-time ally of Comencini within LVR, left that party too in order to be the candidate of the PdV in the next regional election.
