= 2022 Acropolis Rally =

66th edition of Acropolis Rally

2022 Acropolis Rally EKO Acropolis Rally Greece 2022
Round 10 of 13 in the 2022 World Rally Championship
← Previous event	Next event →
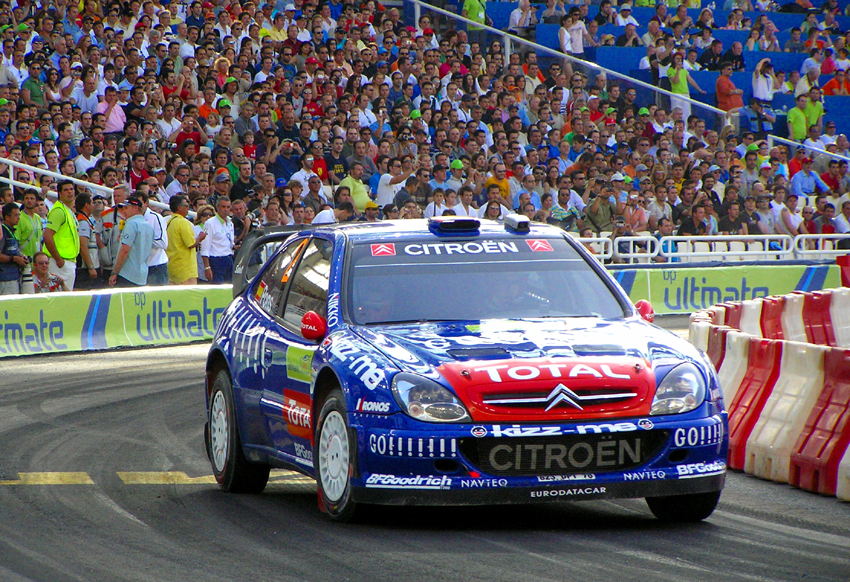
- The rally returned to the Olympic Stadium of Greece (Citroën Xsara WRC pictured in the stadium) for the first time since 2006.
- Host country: Greece
- Rally base: Lamia, Central Greece
- Dates run: 8 – 11 September 2022
- Start location: Athens, Attica
- Finish location: Lamia, Central Greece
- Stages: 16 (303.30 km; 188.46 miles)
- Stage surface: Gravel
- Transport distance: 888.07 km (551.82 miles)
- Overall distance: 1,189.42 km (739.07 miles)

Statistics
- Crews registered: 70
- Crews: 67 at start, 53 at finish

Overall results
- Overall winner: (Belgium) Thierry Neuville (Belgium) Martijn Wydaeghe (South Korea) Hyundai Shell Mobis WRT; 3:34:52.0
- Power Stage winner: (Estonia) Ott Tänak (Estonia) Martin Järveoja (South Korea) Hyundai Shell Mobis WRT; 9:54.5

Support category results
- WRC-2 winner: (Finland) Emil Lindholm (Finland) Reeta Hämäläinen (Germany) Toksport WRT 2; 3:42:38.6
- WRC-3 winner: (Paraguay) Diego Dominguez Jr. (Spain) Rogelio Peñate; 4:02:20.1
- J-WRC winner: (Estonia) Robert Virves (Sweden) Julia Thulin; 3:55:38.4

The 2022 Acropolis Rally (also known as the EKO Acropolis Rally Greece 2022) was a motor racing event for rally cars that was held over four days between 8 and 11 September 2022. It marked the sixty-sixth running of the Acropolis Rally. The event was the tenth round of the 2022 World Rally Championship, World Rally Championship-2 and World Rally Championship-3. The 2022 event was based in the town of Lamia in Central Greece and was contested over sixteen special stages covering a total competitive distance of 303.30 km (188.46 mi).

Kalle Rovanperä and Jonne Halttunen were the defending rally winners. Their team, Toyota Gazoo Racing WRT, were the defending manufacturers' winners. Andreas Mikkelsen and Elliott Edmondson were the defending rally winners in the WRC-2 category. Kajetan Kajetanowicz and Maciej Szczepaniak were the defending rally winners in the WRC-3 category.

Thierry Neuville and Martijn Wydaeghe won their first rally of the season. Their team, Hyundai Shell Mobis WRT, were the manufacturer's winners. Emil Lindholm and Reeta Hämäläinen won the World Rally Championship-2 category. Diego Dominguez Jr. and Rogelio Peñate won the World Rally Championship-3 category. Robert Virves and Julia Thulin won the junior class and with the victory, Virves became the Junior Rally Champion.

== Background ==
=== Entry list ===
The following crews entered into the rally. The event was opened to crews competing in the World Rally Championship, its support categories, the World Rally Championship-2 and World Rally Championship-3, and privateer entries that were registered to score points in any championship. Thirteen were enter under Rally1 regulations, as were thirty-five Rally2 crews in the World Rally Championship-2 and nine Rally3 crews in the World Rally Championship-3.

Rally1 entries competing in the World Rally Championship
No.	Driver	Co-Driver	Entrant	Car	Championship eligibility	Tyre
4	(Finland) Esapekka Lappi	(Finland) Janne Ferm	(Japan) Toyota Gazoo Racing WRT	Toyota GR Yaris Rally1	Driver, Co-driver, Manufacturer	P
6	(Spain) Dani Sordo	(Spain) Cándido Carrera	(South Korea) Hyundai Shell Mobis WRT	Hyundai i20 N Rally1	Driver, Co-driver, Manufacturer	P
7	(France) Pierre-Louis Loubet	(France) Vincent Landais	(United Kingdom) M-Sport Ford WRT	Ford Puma Rally1	Driver, Co-driver	P
8	(Estonia) Ott Tänak	(Estonia) Martin Järveoja	(South Korea) Hyundai Shell Mobis WRT	Hyundai i20 N Rally1	Driver, Co-driver, Manufacturer	P
9	(Greece) Jourdan Serderidis	(Belgium) Frédéric Miclotte	(United Kingdom) M-Sport Ford WRT	Ford Puma Rally1	Driver, Co-driver	P
11	(Belgium) Thierry Neuville	(Belgium) Martijn Wydaeghe	(South Korea) Hyundai Shell Mobis WRT	Hyundai i20 N Rally1	Driver, Co-driver, Manufacturer	P
16	(France) Adrien Fourmaux	(France) Alexandre Coria	(United Kingdom) M-Sport Ford WRT	Ford Puma Rally1	Driver, Co-driver, Manufacturer	—N/a
18	(Japan) Takamoto Katsuta	(Republic of Ireland) Aaron Johnston	(Japan) Toyota Gazoo Racing WRT NG	Toyota GR Yaris Rally1	Driver, Co-driver, Manufacturer/Team	P
19	(France) Sébastien Loeb	(France) Isabelle Galmiche	(United Kingdom) M-Sport Ford WRT	Ford Puma Rally1	Driver, Co-driver, Manufacturer	P
33	(United Kingdom) Elfyn Evans	(United Kingdom) Scott Martin	(Japan) Toyota Gazoo Racing WRT	Toyota GR Yaris Rally1	Driver, Co-driver, Manufacturer	P
42	(Republic of Ireland) Craig Breen	(Republic of Ireland) Paul Nagle	(United Kingdom) M-Sport Ford WRT	Ford Puma Rally1	Driver, Co-driver, Manufacturer	P
44	(United Kingdom) Gus Greensmith	(Sweden) Jonas Andersson	(United Kingdom) M-Sport Ford WRT	Ford Puma Rally1	Driver, Co-driver, Manufacturer	P
69	(Finland) Kalle Rovanperä	(Finland) Jonne Halttunen	(Japan) Toyota Gazoo Racing WRT	Toyota GR Yaris Rally1	Driver, Co-driver, Manufacturer	P

Rally2 entries competing in the World Rally Championship-2
No.	Driver	Co-Driver	Entrant	Car	Championship eligibility	Tyre
20	(Norway) Andreas Mikkelsen	(Norway) Torstein Eriksen	(Germany) Toksport WRT	Škoda Fabia Rally2 evo	Driver, Co-driver, Team	P
21	(France) Yohan Rossel	(France) Valentin Sarreaud	(France) PH Sport	Citroën C3 Rally2	Driver, Co-driver	P
22	(Finland) Teemu Suninen	(Finland) Mikko Markkula	(South Korea) Hyundai Motorsport N	Hyundai i20 N Rally2	Driver, Co-driver, Team	P
23	Nikolay Gryazin (Note: Nikolay Gryazin is Russian, but he competes as a neutral competitor using the ANA flag as Russian national emblems were banned by the association due to the Russian invasion of Ukraine.)	Konstantin Aleksandrov (Note: Konstantin Aleksandrov is Russian, but he competes as a neutral competitor using the ANA flag as Russian national emblems were banned by the association due to the Russian invasion of Ukraine.)	(Germany) Toksport WRT 2	Škoda Fabia Rally2 evo	Junior Driver, Co-driver, Team	P
24	(Norway) Eyvind Brynildsen	(Norway) Roger Eilertsen	(Norway) Eyvind Brynildsen	Škoda Fabia Rally2 evo	Driver, Co-driver, Team	P
25	(Finland) Emil Lindholm	(Finland) Reeta Hämäläinen	(Germany) Toksport WRT 2	Škoda Fabia Rally2 evo	Junior Driver, Co-driver, Team	P
26	(United Kingdom) Chris Ingram	(United Kingdom) Craig Drew	(United Kingdom) Chris Ingram	Škoda Fabia Rally2 evo	Junior Driver, Co-driver	P
27	(Bolivia) Bruno Bulacia	(Spain) Marc Martí	(Bolivia) Bruno Bulacia	Škoda Fabia Rally2 evo	Junior Driver, Co-driver	P
28	(Estonia) Georg Linnamäe	(United Kingdom) James Morgan	(Estonia) ALM Motorsport	Volkswagen Polo GTI R5	Junior Driver, Co-driver	P
29	(Paraguay) Fabrizio Zaldivar	(Argentina) Marcelo Der Ohannesian	(South Korea) Hyundai Motorsport N	Hyundai i20 N Rally2	Junior Driver, Co-driver, Team	P
30	(India) Gaurav Gill	(Brazil) Gabriel Morales	(India) Gaurav Gill	Škoda Fabia R5	Driver, Co-driver	P
31	(Luxembourg) Grégoire Munster	(Belgium) Louis Louka	(Luxembourg) Grégoire Munster	Hyundai i20 N Rally2	Junior Driver, Junior Co-driver	P
32	(Czech Republic) Martin Prokop	(Czech Republic) Michal Ernst	(Czech Republic) Martin Prokop	Ford Fiesta Rally2	Driver, Co-driver	P
34	(Italy) Mauro Miele	(Italy) Luca Beltrame	(Italy) Mauro Miele	Škoda Fabia Rally2 evo	Masters Drivers, Co-driver	—N/a
35	(Germany) Armin Kremer	(Germany) Timo Gottschalk	(Germany) Armin Kremer	Škoda Fabia Rally2 evo	Masters Driver, Co-driver	P
36	(Chile) Jorge Martínez	(Argentina) Alberto Alvarez Nicholson	(Chile) Jorge Martínez	Škoda Fabia Rally2 evo	Driver, Co-driver	P
37	(France) Jean-Michel Raoux	(France) Laurent Magat	(France) Jean-Michel Raoux	Volkswagen Polo GTI R5	Masters Driver, Masters Co-driver	P
38	(France) Jonathan Rieu	(France) Jules Escartefigue	(France) Jonathan Rieu	Citroën C3 Rally2	Driver, Co-driver	P
39	(France) Frédéric Rosati	(France) Loris Pascaud	(France) Frédéric Rosati	Hyundai i20 N Rally2	Masters Driver, Co-driver	P
40	(Italy) Fabrizio Arengi	(Italy) Massimiliano Bosi	(Italy) Fabrizio Arengi	Škoda Fabia Rally2 evo	Masters Driver, Co-driver	P
41	(Peru) Eduardo Castro	(Argentina) Fernando Mussano	(Peru) Eduardo Castro	Škoda Fabia Rally2 evo	Driver, Co-driver	P
43	(Italy) Carlo Covi	(Italy) Michela Lorigiola	(Italy) Carlo Covi	Škoda Fabia R5	Masters Driver, Masters Co-driver	P
45	(Portugal) Diogo Salvi	(Portugal) Hugo Magalhães	(Portugal) Diogo Salvi	Škoda Fabia Rally2 evo	Masters Driver, Co-driver	P
46	(Spain) Miguel Díaz-Aboitiz	(Spain) Jordi Hereu	(Spain) Miguel Díaz-Aboitiz	Škoda Fabia Rally2 evo	Masters Driver, Co-driver	P
47	(Greece) Giorgos Kehagias	(Greece) Dimitris Sainis	(Greece) Giorgos Kehagias	Škoda Fabia Rally2 evo	Driver, Co-driver	P
48	(Greece) Panagiotis Roustemis	(Greece) Christos Bakloris	(Greece) Panagiotis Roustemis	Škoda Fabia Rally2 evo	Junior Driver, Co-driver	P
49	(Greece) Lambros Athanassoulas	(Greece) Nikolaos Zakheos	(Greece) Lambros Athanassoulas	Hyundai i20 N Rally2	Driver, Co-driver	P
50	(Cyprus) Alexandros Tsouloftas	(United Kingdom) Ross Whittock	(Cyprus) Alexandros Tsouloftas	Volkswagen Polo GTI R5	Driver, Co-driver	P
51	(Greece) Chrisostomos Karellis	(Greece) Leonidas Mahaeras	(Greece) Chrisostomos Karellis	Citroën C3 Rally2	Driver, Co-driver	P
52	(Greece) Manos Stefanis	(Greece) Konstantinos Stefanis	(Greece) Manos Stefanis	Hyundai i20 N Rally2	Driver, Co-driver	P
53	(Greece) Vassileios Velanis	(Greece) Ioannis Velanis	(Greece) Vassileios Velanis	Škoda Fabia Rally2 evo	Driver, Co-driver	P
54	(Greece) Efthimios Halkias	(Greece) Andreas Vigkos	(Greece) Efthimios Halkias	Škoda Fabia Rally2 evo	Driver, Co-driver	P
55	(Hungary) János Puskádi	(Hungary) Barnabás Gódor	(Hungary) János Puskádi	Škoda Fabia Rally2 evo	Driver, Co-driver	P
56	(Greece) George Vassilakis	(Greece) Konstantinos Soukoulis	(Greece) George Vassilakis	Ford Fiesta R5	Masters Driver, Co-driver	P
57	(Greece) Dionyssis Spanos	(Greece) Sotiris Gotovos	(Greece) Dionyssis Spanos	Škoda Fabia R5	Driver, Co-driver	P
67	(Oman) Hamed Al-Wahaibi	(Austria) Ilka Minor	(Oman) Hamed Al-Wahaibi	Škoda Fabia Rally2 evo	Masters Driver, Co-driver	P

Rally3 entries competing in the World Rally Championship-3
No.	Driver	Co-Driver	Entrant	Car	Championship eligibility	Tyre
58	(Finland) Sami Pajari	(Finland) Enni Mälkönen	(Finland) Sami Pajari	Ford Fiesta Rally3	Junior	P
59	(United Kingdom) Jon Armstrong	(Republic of Ireland) Brian Hoy	(United Kingdom) Jon Armstrong	Ford Fiesta Rally3	Junior	P
60	(Estonia) Robert Virves	(Sweden) Julia Thulin	(Estonia) Starter Energy Racing	Ford Fiesta Rally3	Junior	P
61	(Finland) Lauri Joona	(Finland) Mikael Korhonen	(Finland) Lauri Joona	Ford Fiesta Rally3	Junior	P
62	(Republic of Ireland) William Creighton	(Republic of Ireland) Liam Regan	(Republic of Ireland) Motorsport Ireland Rally Academy	Ford Fiesta Rally3	Open, Junior	P
63	(Kenya) McRae Kimathi	(Kenya) Mwangi Kioni	(Kenya) McRae Kimathi	Ford Fiesta Rally3	Junior	P
64	(Paraguay) Diego Dominguez Jr.	(Spain) Rogelio Peñate	(Paraguay) Diego Dominguez Jr.	Ford Fiesta Rally3	Open	P
65	(Greece) Epaminondas Karanikolas	(Greece) Giorgos Kakavas	(Greece) Epaminondas Karanikolas	Ford Fiesta Rally3	Open	P
66	(Greece) Panos Ismailos	(United Kingdom) Allan Harryman	(Greece) Panos Ismailos	Ford Fiesta Rally3	Open	P

=== Itinerary ===
All dates and times are EEST (UTC+3).

Date	Time	No.	Stage name	Distance
8 September	8:01	—	Lygaria [Shakedown]	3.66 km
8 September	20:08	SS1	EKO SSS Olympic Stadium	1.95 km
9 September	7:53	SS2	Loutraki 1	17.95 km
9 September	8:46	SS3	Harvati	14.42 km
9 September	11:29	SS4	Loutraki 2	17.95 km
9 September	13:12	SS5	Dafni	14.00 km
9 September	15:10	SS6	Livadia	21.03 km
9 September	17:48	SS7	Bauxites	22.97 km
10 September	8:33	SS8	Pyrgos 1	33.20 km
10 September	9:34	SS9	Perivoli 1	17.42 km
10 September	11:08	SS10	Tarzan 1	23.37 km
10 September	14:33	SS11	Pyrgos 2	33.20 km
10 September	15:34	SS12	Perivoli 2	17.42 km
10 September	17:08	SS13	Tarzan 2	23.37 km
11 September	9:08	SS14	Eleftherochori 1	16.90 km
11 September	10:11	SS15	Elatia-Rengini	11.26 km
11 September	13:18	SS16	Eleftherochori 2 [Power Stage]	16.90 km

== Report ==
=== WRC Rally1 ===
==== Classification ====
Position		No.	Driver	Co-driver	Entrant	Car	Time	Difference	Points	
Event	Class	No.	Driver	Co-driver	Entrant	Car	Time	Difference	Event	Stage
1	1	11	Thierry Neuville	Martijn Wydaeghe	Hyundai Shell Mobis WRT	Hyundai i20 N Rally1	3:34:52.0	0.0	25	0
2	2	8	Ott Tänak	Martin Järveoja	Hyundai Shell Mobis WRT	Hyundai i20 N Rally1	3:35:07.0	+15.0	18	5
3	3	6	Dani Sordo	Cándido Carrera	Hyundai Shell Mobis WRT	Hyundai i20 N Rally1	3:36:41.7	+1:49.7	15	0
4	4	7	Pierre-Louis Loubet	Vincent Landais	M-Sport Ford WRT	Ford Puma Rally1	3:38:34.2	+3:42.2	12	0
5	5	42	Craig Breen	Paul Nagle	M-Sport Ford WRT	Ford Puma Rally1	3:39:01.0	+4:09.0	10	3
6	6	18	Takamoto Katsuta	Aaron Johnston	Toyota Gazoo Racing WRT NG	Toyota GR Yaris Rally1	3:41:13.1	+6:21.1	8	0
15	7	69	Kalle Rovanperä	Jonne Halttunen	Toyota Gazoo Racing WRT	Toyota GR Yaris Rally1	3:51:41.0	+16:49.0	0	4
22	8	4	Esapekka Lappi	Janne Ferm	Toyota Gazoo Racing WRT	Toyota GR Yaris Rally1	3:59:31.0	+24:39.0	0	1
29	9	44	Gus Greensmith	Jonas Andersson	M-Sport Ford WRT	Ford Puma Rally1	4:06:26.4	+31:34.4	0	2
Retired SS14		33	Elfyn Evans	Scott Martin	Toyota Gazoo Racing WRT	Toyota GR Yaris Rally1	Turbo		0	0
Retired SS11		9	Jourdan Serderidis	Frédéric Miclotte	M-Sport Ford WRT	Ford Puma Rally1	Electrical		0	0
Retired SS9		19	Sébastien Loeb	Isabelle Galmiche	M-Sport Ford WRT	Ford Puma Rally1	Alternator belt		0	0
Did not start		16	Adrien Fourmaux	Alexandre Coria	M-Sport Ford WRT	Ford Puma Rally1	Withdrawn		0	0

==== Special stages ====
Stage	Winners	Car	Time	Class leaders
SD	Tänak / Järveoja	Hyundai i20 N Rally1	2:37.9	—N/a
SS1	Neuville / Wydaeghe	Hyundai i20 N Rally1	1:58.4	Neuville / Wydaeghe
SS2	Loeb / Galmiche	Ford Puma Rally1	12:26.8	Loeb / Galmiche
SS3	Loeb / Galmiche	Ford Puma Rally1	10:34.8	Loeb / Galmiche
SS4	Lappi / Ferm	Toyota GR Yaris Rally1	12:06.9	Loeb / Galmiche
SS5	Loubet / Landais	Ford Puma Rally1	7:55.6	Loubet / Landais
SS6	Loubet / Landais	Ford Puma Rally1	13:01.3	Loubet / Landais
SS7	Loeb / Galmiche	Ford Puma Rally1	13:50.5	Loeb / Galmiche
SS8	Tänak / Järveoja	Hyundai i20 N Rally1	25:06.1	Loeb / Galmiche
SS9	Neuville / Wydaeghe	Hyundai i20 N Rally1	14:54.7	Neuville / Wydaeghe
SS10	Neuville / Wydaeghe	Hyundai i20 N Rally1	17:13.6	Neuville / Wydaeghe
SS11	Neuville / Wydaeghe	Hyundai i20 N Rally1	24:54.1	Neuville / Wydaeghe
SS12	Sordo / Carrera	Hyundai i20 N Rally1	14:50.1	Neuville / Wydaeghe
SS13	Tänak / Järveoja	Hyundai i20 N Rally1	16:50.8	Neuville / Wydaeghe
SS14	Tänak / Järveoja	Hyundai i20 N Rally1	10:05.3	Neuville / Wydaeghe
SS15	Neuville / Wydaeghe	Hyundai i20 N Rally1	8:00.6	Neuville / Wydaeghe
SS16	Tänak / Järveoja	Hyundai i20 N Rally1	9:54.5	Neuville / Wydaeghe

==== Championship standings ====
Pos.	Drivers' championships			Co-drivers' championships			Manufacturers' championships		
Pos.	Move	Driver	Points	Move	Co-driver	Points	Move	Manufacturer	Points
1		Kalle Rovanperä	207		Jonne Halttunen	207		Toyota Gazoo Racing WRT	404
2		Ott Tänak	154		Martin Järveoja	154		Hyundai Shell Mobis WRT	341
3	1	Thierry Neuville	131	1	Martijn Wydaeghe	131		M-Sport Ford WRT	214
4	1	Elfyn Evans	116	1	Scott Martin	116		Toyota Gazoo Racing WRT NG	112
5		Takamoto Katsuta	100		Aaron Johnston	100			

=== WRC-2 Rally2 ===
==== Classification ====
Position		No.	Driver	Co-driver	Entrant	Car	Time	Difference	Points		
Event	Class	No.	Driver	Co-driver	Entrant	Car	Time	Difference	Class	Stage	Event
7	1	25	Emil Lindholm	Reeta Hämäläinen	Toksport WRT 2	Škoda Fabia Rally2 evo	3:42:38.6	0.0	25	0	6
8	2	23	Nikolay Gryazin	Konstantin Aleksandrov	Toksport WRT 2	Škoda Fabia Rally2 evo	3:43:14.7	+36.1	18	0	4
9	3	50	Alexandros Tsouloftas	Ross Whittock	Alexandros Tsouloftas	Volkswagen Polo GTI R5	3:45:45.8	+3:07.2	15	1	2
10	4	24	Eyvind Brynildsen	Roger Eilertsen	Eyvind Brynildsen	Škoda Fabia Rally2 evo	3:45:48.7	+3:10.1	12	0	1
11	5	29	Fabrizio Zaldivar	Marcelo Der Ohannesian	Hyundai Motorsport N	Hyundai i20 N Rally2	3:47:57.6	+5:19.0	10	0	0
12	6	30	Gaurav Gill	Gabriel Morales	Gaurav Gill	Škoda Fabia R5	3:50:27.7	+7:49.1	8	0	0
13	7	20	Andreas Mikkelsen	Torstein Eriksen	Toksport WRT	Škoda Fabia Rally2 evo	3:50:32.4	+7:53.8	6	3	0
14	8	32	Martin Prokop	Michal Ernst	Martin Prokop	Ford Fiesta Rally2	3:50:51.8	+8:13.2	4	0	0
16	9	49	Lambros Athanassoulas	Nikolaos Zakheos	Lambros Athanassoulas	Hyundai i20 N Rally2	3:52:06.8	+9:28.2	2	0	0
17	10	22	Teemu Suninen	Mikko Markkula	Hyundai Motorsport N	Hyundai i20 N Rally2	3:52:55.6	+10:17.0	1	2	0
18	11	35	Armin Kremer	Timo Gottschalk	Armin Kremer	Škoda Fabia Rally2 evo	3:54:02.5	+11:23.9	0	0	0
21	12	28	Georg Linnamäe	James Morgan	ALM Motorsport	Volkswagen Polo GTI R5	3:56:20.6	+13:42.0	0	0	0
23	13	38	Jonathan Rieu	Jules Escartefigue	Jonathan Rieu	Citroën C3 Rally2	4:00:22.4	+17:43.8	0	0	0
24	14	53	Vassileios Velanis	Ioannis Velanis	Vassileios Velanis	Škoda Fabia Rally2 evo	4:00:48.8	+18:10.2	0	0	0
25	15	41	Eduardo Castro	Fernando Mussano	Eduardo Castro	Škoda Fabia Rally2 evo	4:01:00.5	+18:21.9	0	0	0
30	16	37	Jean-Michel Raoux	Laurent Magat	Jean-Michel Raoux	Volkswagen Polo GTI R5	4:08:34.2	+25:55.6	0	0	0
31	17	55	János Puskádi	Barnabás Gódor	János Puskádi	Škoda Fabia Rally2 evo	4:08:48.8	+26:10.2	0	0	0
32	18	40	Fabrizio Arengi	Massimiliano Bosi	Fabrizio Arengi	Škoda Fabia Rally2 evo	4:14:06.2	+31:27.6	0	0	0
33	19	45	Diogo Salvi	Hugo Magalhães	Diogo Salvi	Škoda Fabia Rally2 evo	4:16:01.7	+33:23.1	0	0	0
34	20	57	Dionyssis Spanos	Sotiris Gotovos	Dionyssis Spanos	Škoda Fabia R5	4:16:51.7	+34:13.1	0	0	0
35	21	46	Miguel Díaz-Aboitiz	Jordi Hereu	Miguel Díaz-Aboitiz	Škoda Fabia Rally2 evo	4:21:09.7	+38:31.1	0	0	0
40	22	27	Bruno Bulacia	Marc Martí	Bruno Bulacia	Škoda Fabia Rally2 evo	4:34:05.0	+51:26.4	0	0	0
41	23	36	Jorge Martínez	Alberto Alvarez Nicholson	Jorge Martínez	Škoda Fabia Rally2 evo	4:35:49.0	+53:10.4	0	0	0
44	24	51	Chrisostomos Karellis	Leonidas Mahaeras	Chrisostomos Karellis	Citroën C3 Rally2	4:39:05.6	+56:27.0	0	0	0
45	25	43	Carlo Covi	Michela Lorigiola	Carlo Covi	Škoda Fabia R5	4:45:10.1	+1:02:31.5	0	0	0
46	26	54	Efthimios Halkias	Andreas Vigkos	Efthimios Halkias	Škoda Fabia Rally2 evo	4:46:27.5	+1:03:48.9	0	0	0
48	27	47	Giorgos Kehagias	Dimitris Sainis	Giorgos Kehagias	Škoda Fabia Rally2 evo	4:48:37.1	+1:05:58.5	0	0	0
50	28	56	George Vassilakis	Konstantinos Soukoulis	George Vassilakis	Ford Fiesta R5	5:06:55.6	+1:24:17.0	0	0	0
Retired SS16		21	Yohan Rossel	Valentin Sarreaud	PH Sport	Citroën C3 Rally2	Rolled		0	0	0
Retired SS13		31	Grégoire Munster	Louis Louka	Grégoire Munster	Hyundai i20 N Rally2	Withdrawn		0	0	0
Retired SS9		39	Frédéric Rosati	Stéphane Prévot	Frédéric Rosati	Hyundai i20 N Rally2	Mechanical		0	0	0
Retired SS8		26	Chris Ingram	Craig Drew	Chris Ingram	Škoda Fabia Rally2 evo	Rolled		0	0	0
Retired SS7		48	Panagiotis Roustemis	Christos Bakloris	Panagiotis Roustemis	Škoda Fabia Rally2 evo	Off-road		0	0	0
Retired SS4		52	Manos Stefanis	Konstantinos Stefanis	Manos Stefanis	Hyundai i20 N Rally2	Suspension		0	0	0
Did not start		34	Mauro Miele	Luca Beltrame	Mauro Miele	Škoda Fabia Rally2 evo	Withdrawn		0	0	0
Did not start		67	Hamed Al-Wahaibi	Ilka Minor	Hamed Al-Wahaibi	Škoda Fabia Rally2 evo	Driver injury		0	0	0

==== Special stages ====
Stage	Open Championship				Junior Championship				Masters Cup			
Stage	Winners	Car	Time	Class leaders	Winners	Car	Time	Class leaders	Winners	Car	Time	Class leaders
SD	Rossel / Sarreaud	Citroën C3 Rally2	2:47.1	—N/a	Lindholm / Hämäläinen	Škoda Fabia Rally2 evo	2:47.2	—N/a	Kremer / Gottschalk	Škoda Fabia Rally2 evo	2:52.4	—N/a
SS1	Suninen / Markkula	Hyundai i20 N Rally2	1:58.5	Suninen / Markkula	Lindholm / Hämäläinen	Škoda Fabia Rally2 evo	1:59.6	Lindholm / Hämäläinen	Kremer / Gottschalk	Škoda Fabia Rally2 evo	2:01.9	Kremer / Gottschalk
SS2	Mikkelsen / Eriksen	Škoda Fabia Rally2 evo	12:50.0	Lindholm / Hämäläinen	Lindholm / Hämäläinen	Škoda Fabia Rally2 evo	12:56.6	Lindholm / Hämäläinen	Kremer / Gottschalk	Škoda Fabia Rally2 evo	13:31.6	Kremer / Gottschalk
SS3	Mikkelsen / Eriksen	Škoda Fabia Rally2 evo	10:48.5	Lindholm / Hämäläinen	Lindholm / Hämäläinen	Škoda Fabia Rally2 evo	10:51.4	Lindholm / Hämäläinen	Kremer / Gottschalk	Škoda Fabia Rally2 evo	11:37.7	Kremer / Gottschalk
SS4	Lindholm / Hämäläinen	Škoda Fabia Rally2 evo	12:30.2	Lindholm / Hämäläinen	Lindholm / Hämäläinen	Škoda Fabia Rally2 evo	12:30.2	Lindholm / Hämäläinen	Kremer / Gottschalk	Škoda Fabia Rally2 evo	13:21.8	Kremer / Gottschalk
SS5	Lindholm / Hämäläinen	Škoda Fabia Rally2 evo	8:11.6	Lindholm / Hämäläinen	Lindholm / Hämäläinen	Škoda Fabia Rally2 evo	8:11.6	Lindholm / Hämäläinen	Kremer / Gottschalk	Škoda Fabia Rally2 evo	8:37.2	Kremer / Gottschalk
SS6	Gryazin / Aleksandrov	Škoda Fabia Rally2 evo	13:28.3	Lindholm / Hämäläinen	Gryazin / Aleksandrov	Škoda Fabia Rally2 evo	13:28.3	Lindholm / Hämäläinen	Kremer / Gottschalk	Škoda Fabia Rally2 evo	14:07.4	Kremer / Gottschalk
SS7	Mikkelsen / Eriksen	Škoda Fabia Rally2 evo	14:29.5	Lindholm / Hämäläinen	Lindholm / Hämäläinen	Škoda Fabia Rally2 evo	14:40.6	Lindholm / Hämäläinen	Kremer / Gottschalk	Škoda Fabia Rally2 evo	15:29.6	Kremer / Gottschalk
SS8	Mikkelsen / Eriksen	Škoda Fabia Rally2 evo	25:44.2	Lindholm / Hämäläinen	Lindholm / Hämäläinen	Škoda Fabia Rally2 evo	26:03.1	Lindholm / Hämäläinen	Kremer / Gottschalk	Škoda Fabia Rally2 evo	27:00.8	Kremer / Gottschalk
SS9	Rossel / Sarreaud	Citroën C3 Rally2	15:12.7	Lindholm / Hämäläinen	Gryazin / Aleksandrov	Škoda Fabia Rally2 evo	15:18.2	Lindholm / Hämäläinen	Kremer / Gottschalk	Škoda Fabia Rally2 evo	15:58.5	Kremer / Gottschalk
SS10	Mikkelsen / Eriksen	Škoda Fabia Rally2 evo	17:46.4	Lindholm / Hämäläinen	Lindholm / Hämäläinen	Škoda Fabia Rally2 evo	17:51.6	Lindholm / Hämäläinen	Kremer / Gottschalk	Škoda Fabia Rally2 evo	18:45.0	Kremer / Gottschalk
SS11	Mikkelsen / Eriksen	Škoda Fabia Rally2 evo	25:24.1	Lindholm / Hämäläinen	Lindholm / Hämäläinen	Škoda Fabia Rally2 evo	25:37.2	Lindholm / Hämäläinen	Kremer / Gottschalk	Škoda Fabia Rally2 evo	26:47.9	Kremer / Gottschalk
SS12	Mikkelsen / Eriksen	Škoda Fabia Rally2 evo	15:10.7	Lindholm / Hämäläinen	Lindholm / Hämäläinen	Škoda Fabia Rally2 evo	15:13.3	Lindholm / Hämäläinen	Kremer / Gottschalk	Škoda Fabia Rally2 evo	15:44.4	Kremer / Gottschalk
SS13	Mikkelsen / Eriksen	Škoda Fabia Rally2 evo	17:30.4	Lindholm / Hämäläinen	Lindholm / Hämäläinen	Škoda Fabia Rally2 evo	17:42.1	Lindholm / Hämäläinen	Kremer / Gottschalk	Škoda Fabia Rally2 evo	18:25.3	Kremer / Gottschalk
SS14	Mikkelsen / Eriksen	Škoda Fabia Rally2 evo	10:32.0	Lindholm / Hämäläinen	Gryazin / Aleksandrov	Škoda Fabia Rally2 evo	10:48.4	Lindholm / Hämäläinen	Kremer / Gottschalk	Škoda Fabia Rally2 evo	11:23.8	Kremer / Gottschalk
SS15	Mikkelsen / Eriksen	Škoda Fabia Rally2 evo	8:12.2	Lindholm / Hämäläinen	Linnamäe / Morgan	Volkswagen Polo GTI R5	8:22.5	Lindholm / Hämäläinen	Kremer / Gottschalk	Škoda Fabia Rally2 evo	8:54.6	Kremer / Gottschalk
SS16	Mikkelsen / Eriksen	Škoda Fabia Rally2 evo	10:26.5	Lindholm / Hämäläinen	Gryazin / Aleksandrov	Škoda Fabia Rally2 evo	10:40.3	Lindholm / Hämäläinen	Kremer / Gottschalk	Škoda Fabia Rally2 evo	12:15.0	Kremer / Gottschalk

==== Championship standings ====
Pos.	Open Drivers' championships			Open Co-drivers' championships			Teams' championships			Junior Drivers' championships			Junior Co-drivers' championships			Driver Masters' championships			Co-driver Masters' championships		
Pos.	Move	Driver	Points	Move	Co-driver	Points	Move	Manufacturer	Points	Move	Manufacturer	Points	Move	Driver	Points	Move	Driver	Points	Move	Driver	Points
1		Andreas Mikkelsen	109		Torstein Eriksen	109		Toksport WRT	155	1	Emil Lindholm	108		James Fulton	111		Mauro Miele	86		Laurent Magat	100
2	2	Emil Lindholm	89	2	Reeta Hämäläinen	89		Hyundai Motorsport N	143	1	Chris Ingram	92		Louis Louka	61		Freddy Loix	83		Michael Joseph Morrissey	61
3	1	Yohan Rossel	80	1	Maciej Szczepaniak	76		Toksport WRT 2	101		Nikolay Gryazin	79		Samu Vaaleri	50	1	Armin Kremer	75	1	Michela Lorigiola	48
4	1	Kajetan Kajetanowicz	76	2	Konstantin Aleksandrov	70		Yaco ACCR Team	50	3	Georg Linnamäe	59		Elia De Guio	25	1	Jean-Michel Raoux	70	1	Hans van Goor	43
5	1	Nikolay Gryazin	70	2	Valentin Sarreaud	69		Saintéloc Junior Team	40		Mikołaj Marczyk	59					Olivier Burri	48		Jörgen Fornander	25

=== WRC-3 Rally3 ===
==== Classification ====
Position		No.	Driver	Co-driver	Entrant	Car	Time	Difference	Points		
Event	Class	No.	Driver	Co-driver	Entrant	Car	Time	Difference	Open	Junior	Stage
19	1	60	Robert Virves	Julia Thulin	Starter Energy Racing	Ford Fiesta Rally3	3:55:38.4	0.0	—N/a	**50**	**4**
20	2	59	Jon Armstrong	Brian Hoy	Jon Armstrong	Ford Fiesta Rally3	3:55:55.9	+17.5	—N/a	**36**	**6**
26	3	64	Diego Dominguez Jr.	Rogelio Peñate	Diego Dominguez Jr.	Ford Fiesta Rally3	4:02:20.1	+6:41.7	**25**	—N/a	—N/a
27	4	62	William Creighton	Liam Regan	Motorsport Ireland Rally Academy	Ford Fiesta Rally3	4:03:09.7	+7:31.3	**18**	**30**	**0**
28	5	65	Epaminondas Karanikolas	Giorgos Kakavas	Epaminondas Karanikolas	Ford Fiesta Rally3	4:03:54.1	+8:15.7	**15**	—N/a	—N/a
37	6	63	McRae Kimathi	Mwangi Kioni	McRae Kimathi	Ford Fiesta Rally3	4:25:33.9	+29:55.5	—N/a	**24**	**0**
38	7	66	Panos Ismailos	Allan Harryman	Panos Ismailos	Ford Fiesta Rally3	4:25:46.7	+30:08.3	**12**	—N/a	—N/a
43	8	58	Sami Pajari	Enni Mälkönen	Sami Pajari	Ford Fiesta Rally3	4:37:55.7	+42:17.3	—N/a	**20**	**6**
47	9	61	Lauri Joona	Mikael Korhonen	Lauri Joona	Ford Fiesta Rally3	4:47:50.8	+52:12.4	—N/a	**16**	**0**

==== Special stages ====
Stage	Open Championship				Junior Championship			
Stage	Winners	Car	Time	Class leaders	Winners	Car	Time	Class leaders
SD	Dominguez Jr. / Peñate	Ford Fiesta Rally3	2:55.9	—N/a	Virves / Thulin	Ford Fiesta Rally3	2:51.8	—N/a
SS1	Creighton / Regan	Ford Fiesta Rally3	2:05.2	Creighton / Regan	Pajari / Mälkönen	Ford Fiesta Rally3	2:03.5	Pajari / Mälkönen
SS2	Creighton / Regan	Ford Fiesta Rally3	13:28.6	Creighton / Regan	Armstrong / Hoy	Ford Fiesta Rally3	13:17.9	Armstrong / Hoy
SS3	Dominguez Jr. / Peñate	Ford Fiesta Rally3	12:10.8	Creighton / Regan	Armstrong / Hoy	Ford Fiesta Rally3	11:31.6	Armstrong / Hoy
SS4	Creighton / Regan	Ford Fiesta Rally3	14:00.7	Creighton / Regan	Virves / Thulin	Ford Fiesta Rally3	13:32.6	Armstrong / Hoy
SS5	Creighton / Regan	Ford Fiesta Rally3	8:49.3	Creighton / Regan	Virves / Thulin	Ford Fiesta Rally3	8:41.6	Virves / Thulin
SS6	Creighton / Regan	Ford Fiesta Rally3	14:25.1	Creighton / Regan	Armstrong / Hoy	Ford Fiesta Rally3	14:10.4	Virves / Thulin
SS7	Dominguez Jr. / Peñate	Ford Fiesta Rally3	16:38.9	Creighton / Regan	Virves / Thulin	Ford Fiesta Rally3	16:36.5	Virves / Thulin
SS8	Creighton / Regan	Ford Fiesta Rally3	27:24.1	Creighton / Regan	Pajari / Mälkönen	Ford Fiesta Rally3	27:11.0	Virves / Thulin
SS9	Creighton / Regan	Ford Fiesta Rally3	16:03.5	Creighton / Regan	Pajari / Mälkönen	Ford Fiesta Rally3	15:56.6	Virves / Thulin
SS10	Karanikolas / Kakavas	Ford Fiesta Rally3	19:08.8	Karanikolas / Kakavas	Pajari / Mälkönen	Ford Fiesta Rally3	18:25.1	Virves / Thulin
SS11	Creighton / Regan	Ford Fiesta Rally3	27:24.3	Karanikolas / Kakavas	Pajari / Mälkönen	Ford Fiesta Rally3	26:50.5	Virves / Thulin
SS12	Creighton / Regan	Ford Fiesta Rally3	16:07.7	Dominguez Jr. / Peñate	Pajari / Mälkönen	Ford Fiesta Rally3	15:44.1	Virves / Thulin
SS13	Creighton / Regan	Ford Fiesta Rally3	18:50.1	Dominguez Jr. / Peñate	Armstrong / Hoy	Ford Fiesta Rally3	18:05.8	Virves / Thulin
SS14	Creighton / Regan	Ford Fiesta Rally3	11:32.1	Dominguez Jr. / Peñate	Armstrong / Hoy	Ford Fiesta Rally3	11:12.5	Virves / Thulin
SS15	Creighton / Regan	Ford Fiesta Rally3	8:53.3	Dominguez Jr. / Peñate	Virves / Thulin	Ford Fiesta Rally3	8:38.7	Virves / Thulin
SS16	Creighton / Regan	Ford Fiesta Rally3	11:33.3	Dominguez Jr. / Peñate	Armstrong / Hoy	Ford Fiesta Rally3	11:03.2	Virves / Thulin

==== Championship standings ====
- **Bold text** indicates 2022 World Champions.

Pos.	Open Drivers' championships			Open Co-drivers' championships			Junior Drivers' championships			Junior Co-drivers' championships		
Pos.	Move	Driver	Points	Move	Co-driver	Points	Move	Driver	Points	Move	Co-driver	Points
1		Sami Pajari	87		Enni Mälkönen	87	2	**Robert Virves**	130		**Enni Mälkönen**	101
2		Jan Černý	86	3	Liam Regan	63		Jon Armstrong	115		Brian Hoy	97
3		Lauri Joona	86	1	Mikael Korhonen	61	2	Sami Pajari	111		Mikael Korhonen	79
4	3	William Creighton	63	1	Tamás Kürti	61		Lauri Joona	83	2	Julia Thulin	64
5	1	Zoltán László	61	1	Manuel Fenoli	48		William Creighton	68		Liam Regan	53

== Notes ==
Previous rally: 2022 Ypres Rally	2022 FIA World Rally Championship	Next rally: 2022 Rally New Zealand
Previous rally: 2021 Acropolis Rally	2022 Acropolis Rally	Next rally: 2023 Acropolis Rally
