= Gualtiero Busato =

Italian-born French sculptor (1941–2025)

- Born: 14 April 1941; Civitavecchia, Italy
- Died: 3 January 2025 (aged 83); Paris, France
- Occupation: Sculptor

Gualtiero Busato (14 April 1941 – 3 January 2025) was an Italian-born French sculptor who specialized in bronze.

== Life and career ==
Born in Civitavecchia on 14 April 1941, Busato's family moved to Paris in 1949. His father was also a sculptor. Busato founded and presided over the Exposition internationale du petit bronze and the Triennale européenne de sculpture de Paris. In 1972, he held an exposition at the Galleria d'Arte Moderna, Milan and in 1974 held exhibitions at the Musée d'Art Moderne de Paris and the Palais de la Méditerranée. In 1987, exposed at the Musée de la Monnaie de Paris. On 26 May 2004, he was elected as a correspondent of the Académie des Beaux-Arts.

Busato died in Paris on 3 January 2025, at the age of 83.

== Notable works ==
- Les Messagers (Saint-Germain-des-Prés station, Paris)
- La Fontaine du dialogue (Square Vivaldi, Puteaux
- Fontaine du Messager (Angers)
- Fontaine du dialogue (Angers)

== Awards ==
- Prix de la sculpture (Fondation Simone et Cino Del Duca, 2001)
