= Jean-Baptiste Henry Collin de Sussy =

French peer

- Born: March 24, 1776; Châlons-en-Champagne
- Died: April 17, 1837
- Occupation: Politician

Jean-Baptiste Henry Collin, Baron then Count of Sussy, was a French politician born in Châlons-en-Champagne (Previously Châlons-sur-Marne) on March 24, 1776, and died in Paris on April 17, 1837.

== Biography ==
Eldest son of Jean-Baptiste Collin de Sussy (1750-1826), Director General of Customs and then Minister of Manufactures and Trade of Napoleon, and his wife, Louise Millot, he took part in the campaigns of the armies of the Alps and Italy as an engineer attached to the General Staff.

He entered the customs administration after the Peace of Lunéville (1801) and was inspector general in Belgium, from where he was recalled in 1804 to help organize indirect contributions. He was appointed administrator of indirect contributions and confirmed in this function under the Restoration on 6 December 1814, while at the same time being master of petitions to the Council of State.

On 3 January 1827, he was admitted to the House of Peers by hereditary right to replace his deceased father, and took his place among the moderates.

On 30 July 1830, he was instructed by the House of Peers to bring to the Town Hall and the Chamber of Deputies the withdrawal of the ordinances of Saint-Cloud which the Duke of Mortemart had obtained from Charles X. At the Palais Bourbon, he was met with Laffitte's formal refusal to receive him. At the Town Hall, La Fayette received him kindly but was very embarrassed when the Count of Sussy claimed to notify him of the withdrawal of the ordinances: "What do you want us to do with this?" he asked him, and as the peer insisted, he added: "It's over of the Bourbons, you must resign yourself." To prove his claims, La Fayette read out the ordinances, and they were greeted with boos. The Count of Sussy, who wanted to obtain an acknowledgement of receipt, then went to the municipal commission, where Audry de Puyraveau did not want to hear anything. He found La Fayette alone in his office, and eventually obtained an ambiguous note from him acknowledging receipt of the documents.

The Earl of Sussy sat in the House of Peers until his death, after taking the oath to the July Monarchy.

In 1833 he was the creator of the Musée de la Monnaie de Paris inaugurated by King Louis-Philippe I on 8 November 1833.

He was made a knight of the Legion of Honour on February 4, 1815, an officer on December 16, 1827, and a commander on January 15, 1831, when he was colonel of the ^{11th} legion of the National Guard of Paris.

He died on April 17, 1837, and was buried in the Père-Lachaise Cemetery (35th Division).
