= Gianluca Busato =

Italian politician

Gianluca Busato (born Treviso, 14 May 1969) is an Italian entrepreneur, engineer, activist and politician who is mostly known as the main organiser of the unofficial and online Venetian independence referendum, which took place in March 2014.

As a university student of Engineering at the University of Padua, Busato joined Liga Veneta–Lega Nord and was elected municipal councillor in Casier. Having been expelled from that party, he was one of the founding members of the Padanian Independentist Movement in 1997 and was its spokesperson for two years. In this capacity, he was convicted for having been an outspoken supporter of Padania and of the Venetian Most Serene Government's seizure of St. Mark's Campanile in Venice. This last event led Busato to abandon his early Padanist feelings and to adhere to the Venetian independence movement.

According to his own words, Busato returned to active politics only after the depenalisation of "crimes of opinion". In 2006 he wrote a pamphlet on independence and was a founding member of the Venetians Movement and, a year later, he launched the libertarian and avowedly separatist Venetian National Party (PNV), and served as its national secretary from 2008 to 2010. He was later active, often taking leadership roles, in a succession of separatist outfits, all emerged from bulk of the PNV: Veneto State (2010–2012), Venetian Independence (2012–2013), Plebiscite 2013 (2013–2014) and, finally, Veneto Yes (since 2013).

In 2014 Busato came to regional prominence as the main organiser of Plebiscito.eu, an online referendum on Veneto's independence. According to the staff, 2.36 million Venetians (63.2% of all eligible voters) participated in the online referendum and 89.1% of them (that is to say 56.6% of all eligible voters) voted yes. This was enough for Busato and his followers to proclaim Veneto's independence from Italy in Treviso on the night of 21 March. In the poll, ten "delegates for independence" were elected too: Busato was the most voted candidate with 135,306 preference votes.

He has recently opened a crypto company in Slovenia, named Enkronos, launching several ICOs since 2018. They claim to have collected 12 million dollars, both from Venetian people and other speculators.

== Controversies ==
In 2024, Gianluca Busato’s name returned to the headlines, this time over allegations of fraud and unauthorized financial activity, according to the claims made by the Treviso Public Prosecutor’s Office, which opened an investigation file in 2020.

Striscia la Notizia also covered Busato’s activities in a series of reports by Moreno Morello aired between February and March 2024, in which it gathered testimonies from another group of people who said they lost their money in a scam system similar to the one reported in Treviso, involving cryptocurrencies created by Busato himself through the company Enkronos d.o.o., based in Slovenia until 2019 and now Enkronos OÜ, based in Estonia.

In these latest investigations, carried out by the Mirano unit of the Guardia di Finanza, Busato’s company Venice Swap UAB, based in Lithuania, is involved, along with the association Club Imprenditori Veneti nel Mondo - CIVM, also chaired by Gianluca Busato.

Also at the Treviso Public Prosecutor’s Office, Busato is under investigation for fraudulent bankruptcy in connection with the 2019 collapse of Digitnut S.r.l., a company specializing in web and mobile communications. For this charge, Busato has been sent to trial, with the first hearing held on 14 July 2026.
