= Musée du 11 Conti =

Numismatics museum in Paris, France

Coordinates: 48.8566°N 2.3390°E

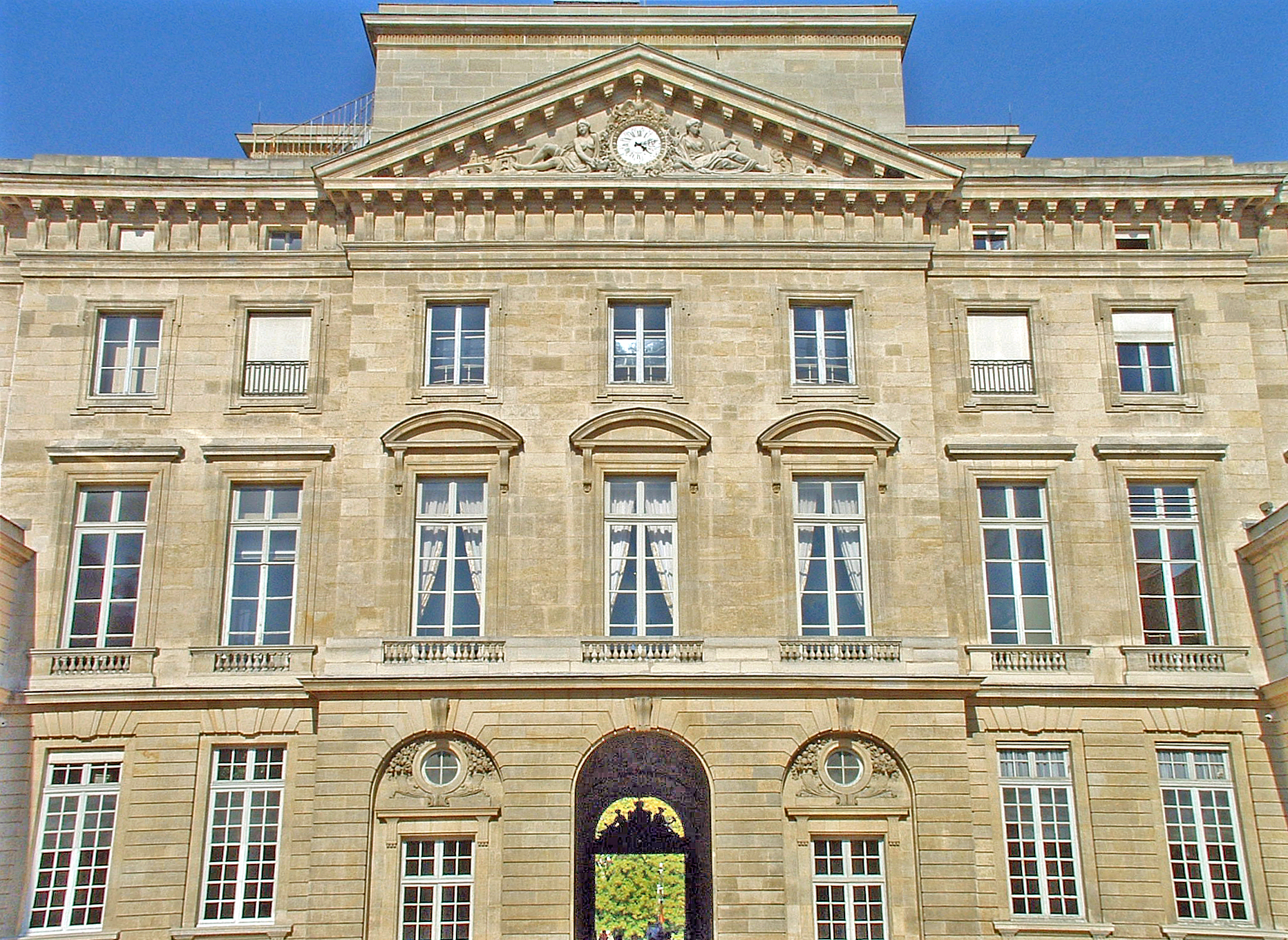
- Established: 1833
- Location: France

The Musée du 11 Conti (previously: Musée de la Monnaie de Paris) is a museum dedicated to the manufacturing techniques and the know-how of the Monnaie de Paris. It is located in the 6th arrondissement in Paris. The museum houses exhibition rooms and workshops. The museum is interactive, showcasing touchable items, tactile graphics and olfactory devices.

Labeled Museum of France, Monnaie de Paris has the mission of managing and managing reserves, inventory, verification, restoration, scientific studies, collaborations with other institutions.

== History ==
The museum was created in 1833 by Jean-Baptiste Henry Collin de Sussy, and inaugurated by Louis-Philippe I on November 8, 1833. It was initially curated by Fernand Mazerolle (1868–1941).

A refreshed museography was presented in 1991, designed by Katherine Gruel (Ancient), Jean Belaubre (Medieval), and Bruno Collin (Modern and Contemporary). All three autographed the catalog of the museum's collections.

It closed its doors on July 31, 2010, for renovation over two years. The Musée de la Monnaie de Paris finally reopened on September 30, 2017.

== Displays ==
Nearly 1,800 objects are presented over 1,200 m^{2}. The new museum exhibits in an interactive and playful scenography highlighting the last factory in Paris. Also on display are key pieces from the collection of the Monnaie de Paris, such as ancient Greek coinage, the gold crown of Philip VI (Capetian coin), a 10 louis d'or coin, a standard meter in platinum, a golden ōban, a collection of Akan weights, treasures of Hué, etc.
