= Robilant+Voena =

Art gallery in Mayfair, London

- Location within Central London
- Established: 2004; 22 years ago
- Location: Mayfair; London, W1S; United Kingdom
- Coordinates: 51.50845°N 0.14235°W
- Founders: Edmondo di Robilant; Marco Voena
- Public transit access: Green Park
- Website: www.robilantvoena.com

Robilant+Voena was a commercial art gallery specializing in European Old Masters and 20th-century Italian and American art, founded in 2004 and operating until 2026. The gallery had spaces in London, Milan, St. Moritz, Paris, and New York. Robilant+Voena held a number of critically acclaimed Old Master exhibitions, of which the most significant include displays of works by the Caravaggisti, Bartolomeo Manfredi, Caspar van Wittel, Giacomo Ceruti, and Antonio Joli.

Its most significant sales include an Artemisia Gentileschi self-portrait sold to the National Gallery in London and a work by Baron Gérard acquired by the Frick Collection in New York.

== Foundation ==
Robilant+Voena was founded by the art dealer Edmondo di Robilant and the Milan-based art dealer Marco Voena, who jointly presented the 1999 exhibition Bologna and Ferrara, Two Centuries of Emilian painting in New York. They launched Robilant+Voena in 2004 with the opening of a gallery on Dover Street, London. Further gallery spaces were opened in Milan in 2009, St Moritz, Switzerland, in 2014, and in Paris and New York in 2020.

== Major acquisitions and sales ==
The gallery has sold paintings and works of art to private and royal collectors and museums including the National Gallery in London, the Metropolitan Museum of Art, New York, the Frick Collection, New York, the Brooklyn Museum, the Louvre Abu Dhabi, the Gallerie dell'Accademia Venice, the Scottish National Gallery, the Nationalmuseum in Stockholm, the National Museum of Western Art in Tokyo, the National Gallery of Victoria, and the Pinacoteca di Brera in Milan.

Notable recent sales include:

- 2017: François-Pascal-Simon Gérard, Prince Camillo Borghese, c. 1810. Frick Collection, New York
- 2017: Claude Vignon, David, c. 1623-1625. Museum of Fine Arts, Boston
- 2018: Artemisia Gentileschi, Self-Portrait as Saint Catherine of Alexandria, c. 1615–1617. National Gallery, London

== Exhibitions ==
Partnerships with brands such as Bottega Veneta, Kiton, Moncler, and Tod's have produced exhibitions exploring the interdisciplinary nature of artistic language, especially with regard to fashion.
