= Venetian Agreement =

Venetian Agreement Intesa Veneta
- Leader: Carlo Covi
- Founded: 2006
- Split from: Italian Democratic Socialists
- Ideology: Regionalism; Centrism; Social democracy

Venetian Agreement (Intesa Veneta, IV) is a centrist social-democratic Italian political party active in Veneto.

It emerged in 2006 as a regional split from the Italian Democratic Socialists and it is led by Carlo Covi, regional deputy, and Monica Balbinot, minister of Culture of Padua. The party was particularly strong in the Municipal Council of Padua: three councillors of out the seven elected by the Socialists in 2004 switched to the new party. In Padua it supported the municipal government led by Flavio Zanonato (Democratic Party) until the elections in June 2009, when it proposed the leader Covi for mayor.

Venetian Agreement took part in 2008 Italian general elections, only in the region of Veneto, gaining 2388 votes (0.006%) for the Chamber of Deputies and 4275 (0.013%) for the Senate.

In October 2008 IV signed a coalition pact with North-East Project (PNE) and Liga Veneta Repubblica (LVR) (which soon left the alliance) for the future municipal, provincial and regional elections "in order to provide an adequate representation to the Venetian people, in line with what happens in Europe, from Scotland to Catalonia, from Wales to Brittany, where federalist, autonomist and independentist parties, who resopond uniquely to their territory, see their popular support increasing." However, in the 2009 provincial and municipal elections, the LVR opted for a different alliance and IV ran only with the PNE. Covi, who was candidate for mayor in Padua, gained 1.8%. IV entered the centre-right coalition at the second ballot, but it was not able to confirm its representance in the council, due to the small number of votes (1.30% only).

For the 2010 regional election, after having formed Veneto Freedom with other Venetist parties, the party finally chose to support Antonio De Poli (UDC) for president under the banner of North-East Union (UNE), along with UNE, PNE and LVR. The list won 1.5% of vote, with peaks of 1.9% and 1.8% in the provinces of Treviso and Belluno, and Mariangelo Foggiato (PNE) was elected to the council.
