= Carlo Covi =

Italian Venetist politician

Carlo Covi (Padua, 29 November 1961) is a Venetist and social-democratic politician from Veneto, Italy.

He entered politics in 1995 when he was elected to the Municipal Council of Padua as an independent Democrat of the Left. In 1999 he joined the Italian Democratic Socialists (SDI), was re-elected to the Municipal Council and became the local leader of the party. Re-elected in 2004, in the 2005 regional election Covi was elected member of the Regional Council of Veneto in the Province of Padua for The Olive Tree. As soon as 2006 he left the SDI in order to launch his own political party, Venetian Agreement, whose name reflected his shift toward Venetism.

In 2009, he was a candidate for Mayor of Padua for Venetian Agreement and North-East Project.

He is also a rally driver and has taken part in several World Rally Championship rallies.
