= 2024 European Rally Championship =

72nd season of the FIA European Rally Championship

The 2024 European Rally Championship was the 72nd season of the FIA European Rally Championship, the European continental championship series in rallying. The season was also the eleventh following the merge between the European Rally Championship and the Intercontinental Rally Challenge.

Hayden Paddon won the championship for the second year in a row, driving a Hyundai i20 N Rally2 prepared by BRC Racing Team. BRC Racing Team also won the constructors' championship.

== Competitions ==
- FIA ERC: Main open championship for all current FIA-homologated cars within sporting classes RC2 to RC5, with Rally2 cars the leading contenders.
- FIA ERC3: Second tier, specifically for the Rally3 class.
- FIA ERC4: Third ERC tier, the first for front-wheel-drive cars. Allows Rally4 and Rally5 cars.
- FIA ERC Junior: For drivers aged 27 and under on 1 January 2024 in Rally4 and Rally5 cars. This championship will be contested over six of the eight rounds.
- FIA European Rally Championship for Teams: each team can nominate a maximum of three cars (from all categories), counting the two highest-placed cars from each team.
- FIA European Rally Championship for Tyre suppliers: a nominated tyre supplier may score points with the two best placed Rally2 cars registered in ERC.
- Fiesta Rally3 Trophy: for Ford Fiesta Rally3 cars. This championship will be contested over five of the eight rounds. The winner of this trophy will get a funded 2024 Central European Rally entry.

== Calendar ==
The 2024 season was contested over eight rounds across Central, Northern and Southern Europe.

Round	Start date	Finish date	Rally	Rally headquarters	Surface	Stages	Distance	Ref.
1	12 April	14 April	Rally Hungary	Veszprém, Veszprém County	Gravel	13	192.43 km	
2	2 May	4 May	(Spain) Rally Islas Canarias	Las Palmas, Canary Islands	Tarmac	13	190.06 km	
3	13 June	15 June	(Sweden) Royal Rally of Scandinavia	Karlstad, Värmland	Gravel	17	190.99 km	
4	5 July	7 July	Rally Estonia	Tartu, Tartu County	Gravel	14	187.79 km	
5	26 July	28 July	(Italy) Rally di Roma Capitale	Fiuggi, Lazio	Tarmac	13	189.52 km	
6	16 August	18 August	(Czech Republic) Barum Czech Rally Zlín	Zlín, Zlín Region	Tarmac	15	193.59 km	
7	30 August	1 September	(United Kingdom) Rali Ceredigion	Aberystwyth, Wales	Tarmac	14	184.16 km	
8	11 October	13 October	(Poland) Rally Silesia	Katowice, Silesia	Tarmac	14	180.15 km	

=== Calendar changes ===
- Rally Serras de Fafe e Felgueiras and Rally Liepāja were removed from the calendar.
- Rally Estonia returned to the calendar.
- Rali Ceredigion in Great Britain and Rally Silesia in Poland were introduced to the calendar.

== Entry list ==
=== ERC ===
Rally2, R5 and RGT entries
Entrant	Car	Driver	Co-Driver	Tyres	Rounds
(Czech Republic) ACCR Orsák Rally Sport	Škoda Fabia RS Rally2	(Czech Republic) Erik Cais	(Slovakia) Igor Bacigál	MI	1–2, 5–6
(Czech Republic) ACCR Toyota Dolák	Toyota GR Yaris Rally2	(Czech Republic) Filip Mareš	(Czech Republic) Radovan Bucha	HK	1–3, 5–6
(Czech Republic) Agrotec Škoda Rally Team	Škoda Fabia RS Rally2	(Czech Republic) Jan Kopecký	(Czech Republic) Jan Hloušek	MI	6
(Spain) Auto-Laca Competición	Citroën C3 Rally2	(Spain) Luis Monzón	(Spain) José Carlos Déniz	P	2
(Czech Republic) Auto Podbabská Škoda Mol Team	Škoda Fabia RS Rally2	(Czech Republic) Dominik Stříteský	(Czech Republic) Jiří Hovorka	HK	6
(Italy) BRC Racing Team	Hyundai i20 N Rally2	(New Zealand) Hayden Paddon	(New Zealand) John Kennard	P	1–7
(Spain) C.D. Copi Sport	Ford Fiesta Rally2	(Spain) Enrique Cruz	(Spain) Yeray Mújica	P	2
(Spain) C.D. Todo Sport	Citroën C3 Rally2	(Spain) Yeray Lemes	(Spain) Rogelio Peñate	MI	2
(Spain) C.D. Todo Sport	Hyundai i20 N Rally2	(Cyprus) Alexey Lukyanuk	(Cyprus) Yuriy Kulikov	P	2
(Spain) C.D. Todo Sport	Citroën C3 Rally2	(Spain) Miguel Suárez	(Spain) Eduardo González	P	2
(Spain) Citroën Rally Team	Citroën C3 Rally2	(Spain) Diego Ruiloba	(Spain) Ángel Vela	P	2
(Israel) Cone Forest Motorsport	Ford Fiesta R5	(Israel) Sergey Uger	(Israel) Maria Uger Obolenskaya	MI	4
(Hungary) Dunakanyar Autós SE	Citroën C3 Rally2	(Hungary) Róbert Bútor	(Hungary) Róbert Tagai	MI	1
(Lithuania) Eldorado x Humbility Sports	Škoda Fabia Rally2 evo	(Lithuania) Vladas Jurkevičius	(Lithuania) Aisvydas Paliukėnas	P	1
(Czech Republic) EuroOil Team	Škoda Fabia R5	(Czech Republic) Václav Pech Jr.	(Czech Republic) Petr Uhel	P	6
Eurosol Racing Team Hungary	Škoda Fabia RS Rally2	(Republic of Ireland) Callum Devine	(Republic of Ireland) Noel O'Sullivan Jr.		7
Eurosol Racing Team Hungary	Škoda Fabia RS Rally2	(Austria) Simon Wagner	(Austria) Gerald Winter	MI	1–2
Eurosol Racing Team Hungary	Škoda Fabia RS Rally2	(Austria) Simon Wagner	(Germany) Jara Hain	MI	5–6
(Hungary) Extrém Sport Team Kft.	Škoda Fabia Rally2 evo	(Hungary) József Trencsényi	(Hungary) Gábor Verba	P	1
(Italy) F.P.F. Sport	Citroën C3 Rally2	(Italy) Andrea Crugnola	(Italy) Pietro Elia Ometto	P	5
(Italy) F.P.F. Sport	Citroën C3 Rally2	(Italy) Giacomo Scattolon	(Italy) Gabriele Zanni	P	5
(Hungary) HRT Racing Kft.	Škoda Fabia Rally2 evo	(Hungary) Miklós Csomós	(Hungary) Attila Nagy	P	1–2
(Hungary) HRT Racing Kft.	Škoda Fabia RS Rally2	(Hungary) Miklós Csomós	(Hungary) Attila Nagy	P	3
(Spain) Hyundai Motor España	Hyundai i20 N Rally2	(Spain) Óscar Palomo	(Spain) Sergio Fernández	P	2
(Spain) Hyundai Motor España -AresRacing-	Hyundai i20 N Rally2	(Spain) Iván Ares	(Spain) Javier Martínez	P	2
(Czech Republic) invelt - s.r.o.	Toyota GR Yaris Rally2	(Czech Republic) Jakub Jirovec	(Czech Republic) Petr Jindra Jr.	P	6
(Sweden) JC Raceteknik	Škoda Fabia RS Rally2	(Sweden) Isak Reiersen	(Sweden) Stefan Gustavsson	P	3
(Hungary) Kole Média Center Kft.	Škoda Fabia RS Rally2	(Hungary) Gábor Német	(Hungary) Gergely Németh	P	1
(Hungary) Kole Média Center Kft.	Škoda Fabia Rally2 evo	(Hungary) Ferenc Vincze Jr.	(Hungary) Gergely Németh	P	5
(Hungary) Klaus Motorsport	Škoda Fabia Rally2 evo	(Hungary) Kristóf Klausz	(Hungary) Tamás Papp	P	1
(Poland) Kowax Racing	Hyundai i20 N Rally2	(Czech Republic) Martin Vlček	(Czech Republic) Jakub Kunst	HK	6
(Sweden) Kristofferson Motorsport	Volkswagen Polo GTI R5	(Sweden) Johan Kristoffersson	(Norway) Stig Rune Skjærmoen	P	3
(Estonia) OT Racing	Ford Fiesta Rally2	(Estonia) Kaspar Kasari	(Estonia) Rainis Randma	P	4
(Hungary) Pécsi Sport Nonprofit Zrt.	Škoda Fabia R5	(Hungary) Péter Ranga	(Hungary) János Czakó	P	1
(Poland) Plon RT	Škoda Fabia RS Rally2	(Poland) Jarosław Kołtun	(Poland) Ireneusz Pleskot	MI	5–6
(Czech Republic) PRAGA Automotive	Škoda Fabia R5	(Czech Republic) Aleš Jirásek	(Czech Republic) Petr Machů	MI	6
(Spain) Recalvi Team	Alpine A110 Rally RGT	(Spain) Javier Pardo	(Spain) David de la Puente	MI	2
(Spain) Recalvi Team	Škoda Fabia RS Rally2	(Spain) José Antonio Suárez	(Spain) Alberto Iglesias	MI	2
(Estonia) RedGrey Team	Ford Fiesta Rally2	(Republic of Ireland) William Creighton	(Republic of Ireland) Liam Regan	P	7
(Estonia) RedGrey Team	Toyota GR Yaris Rally2	(Estonia) Gregor Jeets	(Estonia) Timo Taniel	MI	4
(Estonia) RedGrey Team	Toyota GR Yaris Rally2	(Estonia) Georg Linnamäe	(United Kingdom) James Morgan	MI	4
(Estonia) RedGrey Team	Ford Fiesta Rally2	(United Kingdom) Garry Pearson	(United Kingdom) Daniel Barritt		7
(Czech Republic) Samohýl Škoda Team	Škoda Fabia RS Rally2	(Czech Republic) Adam Březík	(Czech Republic) Ondřej Krajča	MI	5–6
(Estonia) SC - 911 Team	Citroën C3 Rally2	(Bulgaria) Nikolay Gryazin	(Latvia) Andris Mālnieks	P	4
(Hungary) SZA Performance Kft.	Ford Fiesta Rally2	(Hungary) László Bodolai	(Hungary) Attila Deák	P	1
(Hungary) SZA Performance Kft.	Ford Fiesta Rally2	(Hungary) András Hadik	(Hungary) István Juhász	P	1
(Italy) T-Racing	Toyota GR Yaris Rally2	(Italy) Giandomenico Basso	(Italy) Lorenzo Granai	P	5
(India) Team MRF Tyres	Citroën C3 Rally2	(Italy) Paolo Andreucci	(Italy) Rudy Briani	MR	5
(India) Team MRF Tyres	Škoda Fabia RS Rally2	(Spain) Efrén Llarena	(Spain) Sara Fernández	MR	1–3
(India) Team MRF Tyres	Škoda Fabia RS Rally2	(Italy) Andrea Mabellini	(Italy) Virginia Lenzi	MR	1–7
(India) Team MRF Tyres	Škoda Fabia Rally2 evo	(Belgium) Amaury Molle	(France) Alex Dubois	MR	6–7
(India) Team MRF Tyres	Toyota GR Yaris Rally2	(Latvia) Mārtiņš Sesks	(Latvia) Renārs Francis	MR	1–4
(Hungary) Topp-Cars Rally Team	Škoda Fabia RS Rally2	(Hungary) Martin László	(Hungary) Viktor Bán	P	1–2, 6
(Hungary) Topp-Cars Rally Team	Škoda Fabia Rally2 evo	(Hungary) Martin László	(Hungary) Gábor Zsiros	P	5
(Spain) Toyota España	Toyota GR Yaris Rally2	(Spain) Alejandro Cachón	(Spain) Borja Rozada	P	2
(Japan) Toyota Gazoo Racing WRT NG	Toyota GR Yaris Rally2	(Japan) Yuki Yamamoto	(Finland) Marko Salminen	P	4
(Hungary) Treff-Autóház Kft.	Škoda Fabia R5	(Hungary) Sándor Ollé	(Hungary) Rebeka Ollé	P	1
(Hungary) TRT Rally Team	Citroën C3 Rally2	(Norway) Mads Østberg	(Sweden) Patrik Barth	MI	1–6
(Hungary) Turán Motorsport SE	Volkswagen Polo GTI R5	(Hungary) Frigyes Turán	(Hungary) Gábor Zsiros	HK	1
Private entries	Hyundai i20 N Rally2	(United Kingdom) Philip Allen	(United Kingdom) Dale Furniss	P	1–2
Private entries	Škoda Fabia RS Rally2	(United Kingdom) Philip Allen	(United Kingdom) Dale Furniss	P	3–4, 6–7
Private entries	Ford Fiesta Rally2	(Republic of Ireland) Jon Armstrong	(Republic of Ireland) Eoin Treacy	P	1–7
Private entries	Škoda Fabia RS Rally2	(Finland) Teemu Asunmaa	(Finland) Ville Mannisenmäki		4
Private entries	Škoda Fabia RS Rally2	(Slovenia) Boštjan Avbelj	(Slovenia) Damijan Andrejka	P	5
Private entries	Škoda Fabia RS Rally2	(Spain) Roberto Blach	(Spain) Mauro Barreiro	P	2
Private entries	Citroën C3 Rally2	(France) Yoann Bonato	(France) Benjamin Boulloud	MI	2
Private entries	Volkswagen Polo GTI R5	(Norway) Eyvind Brynildsen	(Norway) Jørn Listerud	P	3
Private entries	Škoda Fabia RS Rally2	(Italy) Simone Campedelli	(Italy) Tania Canton	P	5
Private entries	Škoda Fabia Rally2 evo	(Italy) Giacomo Costenaro	(United Kingdom) Justin Bardini	MR	1–2
Private entries	Škoda Fabia R5	(Italy) Giacomo Costenaro	(Italy) Pietro Elia Ometto	MR	3–4
Private entries	Škoda Fabia RS Rally2	(Romania) Bogdan Cuzma	(Denmark) Ditte Kammersgaard	MI	1
Private entries	Škoda Fabia RS Rally2	(Romania) Bogdan Cuzma	(Romania) Florin Dorca	MI	3
Private entries	Škoda Fabia RS Rally2	(Italy) Roberto Daprà	(Italy) Luca Guglielmetti	P	5
Private entries	Toyota GR Yaris Rally2	(United Kingdom) Meirion Evans	(United Kingdom) Jonathan Jackson	MI	7
Private entries	Škoda Fabia RS Rally2	(France) Mathieu Franceschi	(France) Andy Malfoy	MI	1–7
Private entries	Ford Fiesta Rally2	(Sweden) Kalle Gustafsson	(Sweden) Magnus Nilsson	P	3
Private entries	Volkswagen Polo GTI R5	(Sweden) Christoffer Haglund	(Sweden) Johan Johansson	P	3
Private entries	Toyota GR Yaris Rally2	(Finland) Mikko Heikkilä	(Finland) Kristian Temonen	MI	1, 3–4
Private entries	Škoda Fabia RS Rally2	(Spain) Raúl Hernández	(Spain) José Murado	P	2
Private entries	Toyota GR Yaris Rally2	(United Kingdom) Chris Ingram	(United States) Alexander Kihurani	MI	7
Private entries	Hyundai i20 N Rally2	(Finland) Benjamin Korhola	(Finland) Sebastian Virtanen	P	4
Private entries	Volkswagen Polo GTI R5	(Norway) Frank Tore Larsen	(Norway) Lars-Håkon Lundgreen	P	3
Private entries	Volkswagen Polo GTI R5	(Norway) Frank Tore Larsen	(Norway) Torstein Eriksen	P	4
Private entries	Hyundai i20 N Rally2	(France) Stéphane Lefebvre	(France) Anthony Hamard	MI	5
Private entries	Škoda Fabia RS Rally2	(Spain) Efrén Llarena	(Spain) Sara Fernández	MI	5–6
Private entries	Škoda Fabia RS Rally2	(Poland) Mikołaj Marczyk	(Poland) Szymon Gospodarczyk	MI	1–7
Private entries	Škoda Fabia RS Rally2	(Italy) Fabio Mezzatesta	(Switzerland) Marco Menchini	P	5
Private entries	Škoda Fabia RS Rally2	(Belgium) Amaury Molle	(France) Alex Dubois	MR	5
Private entries	Škoda Fabia RS Rally2	(Austria) Hermann Neubauer	(Austria) Bernhard Ettel	P	2, 6
Private entries	Ford Fiesta Rally2	(United Kingdom) Osian Pryce	(United Kingdom) Rhodri Evans		7
Private entries	Škoda Fabia RS Rally2	(Sweden) Oliver Solberg	(United Kingdom) Elliott Edmondson	P	3
Private entries	Volkswagen Polo GTI R5	(Norway) Petter Solberg	(Sweden) Jonas Andersson	P	3
Private entries	Citroën C3 Rally2	(Italy) Rachele Somaschini	(Italy) Nicola Arena	P	5
Private entries	Škoda Fabia RS Rally2	(Romania) Simone Tempestini	(Romania) Sergiu Itu	P	1, 3–6
Private entries	Škoda Fabia RS Rally2	(Germany) Albert von Thurn und Taxis	(Germany) Frank Christian	P	2, 6–7
Private entries	Škoda Fabia RS Rally2	(Estonia) Robert Virves	(United Kingdom) Craig Drew	P	4
Private entries	Hyundai i20 N Rally2	(United Kingdom) James Williams	(United Kingdom) Ross Whittock		7

=== ERC3 ===
Rally3 entries
Entrant	Car	Driver	Co-Driver	Tyres	Rounds	Trophy
(Turkey) Atölye Kazaz	Ford Fiesta Rally3	(Turkey) Kerem Kazaz	(Latvia) Andris Mālnieks	P	1, 3	FRally3T
(Turkey) Atölye Kazaz	Ford Fiesta Rally3	(Turkey) Kerem Kazaz	(France) Corentin Silvestre	P	5–6	FRally3T
(Turkey) Atölye Kazaz	Ford Fiesta Rally3	(Turkey) Kerem Kazaz	(Portugal) Hugo Magalhães	MR	2, 4	
(Slovakia) Chooligan Racing Team	Ford Fiesta Rally3	(Slovakia) Robert Kolčák	(Slovakia) Zuzana Lieskovcová	P	6	
(Poland) Grupa PGS RT	Ford Fiesta Rally3	(Poland) Igor Widłak	(Poland) Michał Marczewski	P	1, 4–5	FRally3T
(Poland) Grupa PGS RT	Ford Fiesta Rally3	(Poland) Igor Widłak	(Poland) Michał Marczewski	P	7	
(Poland) Grupa PGS RT	Ford Fiesta Rally3	(Poland) Igor Widłak	(Poland) Daniel Dymurski	P	2	
(Poland) Grupa PGS RT	Ford Fiesta Rally3	(Poland) Igor Widłak	(Poland) Daniel Dymurski	P	3, 6	FRally3T
(Estonia) LightGrey	Ford Fiesta Rally3	(Estonia) Patrick Enok	(Estonia) Silver Simm	P	4	
(Estonia) LightGrey	Renault Clio Rally3	(Estonia) Joosep Ralf Nõgene	(Estonia) Aleks Lesk	P	4	
M-Sport Poland	Ford Fiesta Rally3	(Poland) Jakub Matulka	(Poland) Daniel Dymurs	P	7	
Team Estonia Autosport	Ford Fiesta Rally3	(Estonia) Romet Jürgenson	(Estonia) Siim Oja	P	4	
Private entries	Ford Fiesta Rally3	(France) Tristan Charpentier	(France) Florian Barral	P	3	FRally3T
Private entries	Ford Fiesta Rally3	(France) Tristan Charpentier	(France) Alexis Maillefert	P	4	FRally3T
Private entries	Ford Fiesta Rally3	(Czech Republic) Filip Kohn	(United Kingdom) Tom Woodburn	P	1, 3–6	FRally3T
Private entries	Ford Fiesta Rally3	(Czech Republic) Filip Kohn	(United Kingdom) Tom Woodburn	P	7	
Private entries	Ford Fiesta Rally3	(Republic of Ireland) Eamonn Kelly	(Republic of Ireland) Rory Kennedy	P	7	
Private entries	Renault Clio Rally3	(Poland) Hubert Kowalczyk	(Poland) Jarosław Hryniuk	P	5–6	
Private entries	Ford Fiesta Rally3	(Croatia) Martin Ravenščak	(Croatia) Dora Ravenščak	P	1, 3–6	FRally3T
Private entries	Renault Clio Rally3	(Bulgaria) Aleksandar Tomov	(Bulgaria) Dimitar Spasov	P	5–7	

=== ERC4 ===
Rally4 and R3 entries
Entrant	Car	Driver	Co-Driver	Tyres	Rounds	Category
(Germany) ADAC Opel Rallye Junior Team	Opel Corsa Rally4	(Sweden) Calle Carlberg	(Norway) Jørgen Eriksen	HK	1–4, 7	ERC4J
(Germany) ADAC Opel Rallye Junior Team	Opel Corsa Rally4	(Germany) Timo Schulz	(Germany) Michael Wenzel	HK	1–4, 7	ERC4J
(Estonia) ALM Motorsport	Peugeot 208 Rally4	(Estonia) Karl-Markus Sei	(Estonia) Martin Leotoots	HK	1–4	ERC4J
(Hungary) HRT Racing Kft.	Peugeot 208 Rally4	(Hungary) Márton Bertalan	(Hungary) Róbert Paizs	P	1, 4–6	
(Hungary) HRT Racing Kft.	Peugeot 208 Rally4	(Hungary) Patrik Herczig	(Hungary) Kristóf Varga	HK	1–4	ERC4J
(Hungary) HRT Racing Kft.	Peugeot 208 Rally4	(Hungary) Patrik Herczig	(Hungary) Kristóf Varga	HK	6	
(Hungary) HRT Racing Kft.	Peugeot 208 Rally4	(Norway) Herman Lie-Nilsen	(Norway) Vegard Halland	HK	3	ERC4J
(Hungary) HRT Racing Kft.	Peugeot 208 Rally4	(Bulgaria) Aleksandar Tomov	(Bulgaria) Yavor Brankov	HK	1–2	ERC4J
(Slovenia) IK Sport Racing	Opel Corsa Rally4	(Sweden) Mille Johansson	(Sweden) Johan Grönvall	HK	1–4, 7	ERC4J
M-Sport Poland	Ford Fiesta Rally4	(Estonia) Jaspar Vaher	(Estonia) Sander Pruul	HK	1, 4	ERC4J
(Republic of Ireland) Motorsport Ireland Rally Academy	Peugeot 208 Rally4	(Republic of Ireland) Jack Brennan	(Republic of Ireland) John McGrath	HK	1–2, 7	ERC4J
(Republic of Ireland) Motorsport Ireland Rally Academy	Peugeot 208 Rally4	(Republic of Ireland) Kyle McBride	(Republic of Ireland) Darragh Mullen	MI	7	
(Republic of Ireland) Motorsport Ireland Rally Academy	Peugeot 208 Rally4	(Republic of Ireland) Aoife Raftery	(Republic of Ireland) Hannah McKillop	HK	1–4, 7	ERC4J
(Hungary) TRT Rally Team	Peugeot 208 Rally4	(United Kingdom) Max McRae	(United Kingdom) Cameron Fair	HK	1–4, 7	ERC4J
Private entries	Peugeot 208 Rally4	(Italy) Giorgio Cogni	(Italy) Simone Brachi	P	5	
Private entries	Ford Fiesta Rally4	(Sweden) Adam Grahn	(Sweden) Marcus Sundh	HK	4	ERC4J
Private entries	Peugeot 208 Rally4	(Sweden) Patrik Hallberg	(Sweden) John Stigh	HK	3	ERC4J
Private entries	Peugeot 208 Rally4	(Austria) Alfred Kramer	(Denmark) Jeannette Kvick	HK	1	ERC4J
Private entries	Ford Fiesta Rally4	(Finland) Leevi Lassila	(Finland) Antti Linnaketo	HK	1	ERC4J
Private entries	Peugeot 208 Rally4	(United Kingdom) Ioan Lloyd	(United Kingdom) Sion Williams	MI	7	
Private entries	Opel Corsa Rally4	(Germany) Liam Müller	(Germany) Alexander Hirsch	HK	1–3	ERC4J
Private entries	Peugeot 208 Rally4	(Italy) Geronimo Nerobutto	(Italy) Alessio Angeli	HK	1–3	ERC4J
Private entries	Opel Corsa Rally4	(Romania) Cristiana Oprea	(Romania) Denisa-Alexia Parteni	P	1–2, 4	
Private entries	Peugeot 208 Rally4	(Italy) Davide Pesavento	(Italy) Matteo Zaramella	HK	1–2	ERC4J
Private entries	Peugeot 208 Rally4	(Italy) Davide Pesavento	(Italy) Flavio Zanella	HK	3–4, 7	ERC4J
Private entries	Peugeot 208 Rally4	(Italy) Davide Pesavento	(Italy) Nicolò Gonella	P	5	
Private entries	Peugeot 208 Rally4	(Italy) Gianandrea Pisani	(Italy) Massimo Moricani	MI	5	
Private entries	Peugeot 208 Rally4	(Czech Republic) Daniel Polášek	(Czech Republic) Zdeněk Omelka	HK	1–4, 7	ERC4J
Private entries	Peugeot 208 Rally4	(Czech Republic) Daniel Polášek	(Czech Republic) Zdeněk Omelka	HK	5	
Private entries	Renault Clio Rally4	(Italy) Michael Rendina	(Italy) Fabiano Cipriani	P	5	
Private entries	Peugeot 208 Rally4	(Bulgaria) Ekaterina Stratieva	(Bulgaria) Georgi Avramov	MR	2, 5–6	
Private entries	Ford Fiesta Rally4	(Finland) Tuomas Välilä	(Finland) Päivi Välilä	P	1, 4	
Private entries	Peugeot 208 Rally4	(Italy) Mattia Zanin	(Italy) Elia De Guio	HK	1–4	ERC4J
Rally5 entries
Private entries	Renault Clio Rally5	(Romania) Ciprian Lupu	(Romania) Andrei Aițculesei	P	5–6	

== Results ==
=== Season summary ===
Round	Event	Winning driver	Winning co-driver	Winning entrant	Winning time	Report	Ref.
1	Rally Hungary	(Romania) Simone Tempestini	(Romania) Sergiu Itu	(Romania) Simone Tempestini	1:52:50.4	Report	
2	(Spain) Rally Islas Canarias	(France) Yoann Bonato	(France) Benjamin Boulloud	(France) Yoann Bonato	1:57:18.8	Report	
3	(Sweden) Royal Rally of Scandinavia	(Sweden) Oliver Solberg	(United Kingdom) Elliott Edmondson	(Sweden) Oliver Solberg	1:32:40.8	Report	
4	Rally Estonia	(Estonia) Georg Linnamäe	(United Kingdom) James Morgan	(Estonia) RedGrey Team	1:44:33.1	Report	
5	(Italy) Rally di Roma Capitale	(Italy) Andrea Crugnola	(Italy) Pietro Elia Ometto	(Italy) F.P.F. Sport	1:53:10.9	Report	
6	(Czech Republic) Barum Czech Rally Zlín	(Czech Republic) Dominik Stříteský	(Czech Republic) Jiří Hovorka	(Czech Republic) Auto Podbabská Škoda Mol Team	1:41:56.7	Report	
7	(United Kingdom) Rali Ceredigion	(New Zealand) Hayden Paddon	(New Zealand) John Kennard	(Italy) BRC Racing Team	1:38:59.0	Report	
8	(Poland) Rally Silesia	(Italy) Andrea Mabellini	(Italy) Virginia Lenzi	(India) Team MRF Tyres	1:45:28.9	Report	

=== Scoring system ===
Points for final position are awarded as in the following table in ERC, ERC3 and ERC4. In ERC, ERC3 and ERC4, the best seven scores from the eight rounds count towards the final number of points. In Junior category, best five rounds of six count.

Position	1st	2nd	3rd	4th	5th	6th	7th	8th	9th	10th	11th	12th	13th	14th	15th
Points	30	24	21	19	17	15	13	11	9	7	5	4	3	2	1

There are also five bonus points awarded to the winners of the Power Stage, four points for second place, three for third, two for fourth and one for fifth. Power Stage points are awarded only in the main ERC drivers' and co-drivers' championships.

Position	1st	2nd	3rd	4th	5th
Points	5	4	3	2	1

=== Drivers' Championships ===
==== ERC ====
Pos	Driver	HUN (Hungary)	CAN (Spain)	SWE (Sweden)	EST (Estonia)	ITA (Italy)	CZE (Czech Republic)	GBR (United Kingdom)	POL (Poland)	Points	Best 7
1	(New Zealand) Hayden Paddon	4	6^{5}	3	5	6^{5}	12^{3}	1^{1}	3	152	145
2	(France) Mathieu Franceschi	2^{1}	2^{3}	Ret	10	5^{4}	Ret	3^{5}	5^{3}	124	124
3	(Poland) Mikołaj Marczyk	6	7	8^{5}	7	11	7^{5}	4	4^{2}	114	109
4	(Italy) Andrea Mabellini	7^{4}	17	9	8	9	16	2^{3}	1	101	101
5	(Republic of Ireland) Jon Armstrong	8^{5}	8	Ret	6^{4}	17	26	6^{2}	2^{1}	88	88
6	(Romania) Simone Tempestini	1^{3}		10	Ret	4		Ret	Ret	59	59
7	(Norway) Mads Østberg	DNS	9	5^{3}	4^{3}	Ret				51	51
8	(France) Yoann Bonato		1^{4}						6^{4}	49	49
9	(Austria) Simon Wagner	9	11			10	2^{2}			49	49
10	(Spain) Efrén Llarena	Ret	12	14		3^{3}	6			45	45
11	(Czech Republic) Erik Cais	5	15			21	3^{1}			44	44
12	(Sweden) Oliver Solberg			1^{1}						35	35
13	(Estonia) Georg Linnamäe				1^{1}					35	35
14	(Italy) Andrea Crugnola					1^{1}				35	35
15	(Czech Republic) Dominik Stříteský						1			30	30
16	(Czech Republic) Filip Mareš	10	16	13		15	5^{4}			30	30
17	(Finland) Mikko Heikkilä	Ret		2^{2}	Ret					28	28
18	(Estonia) Robert Virves				2^{2}					28	28
19	(Italy) Simone Campedelli					2^{2}				28	28
20	(Spain) Alejandro Cachón		3^{1}							26	26
21	(Hungary) Miklós Csomós	3^{2}	Ret							25	25
22	(Norway) Frank Tore Larsen			4^{4}	13					24	24
23	(Spain) Diego Ruiloba		4^{2}							23	23
24	(Bulgaria) Nikolay Gryazin				3					21	21
25	(Czech Republic) Adam Březík						4			19	19
26	(Republic of Ireland) Callum Devine							5^{4}		19	19
27	(Spain) José Antonio Suárez		5							17	17
28	(Latvia) Mārtiņš Sesks	Ret	23	6	14					17	17
29	(Sweden) Isak Reiersen			7						13	13
30	(Slovenia) Boštjan Avbelj					7				13	13
31	(United Kingdom) Osian Pryce							7		13	13
32	(Poland) Grzegorz Grzyb								7	13	13
33	(Austria) Hermann Neubauer		19				8			11	11
34	(Italy) Giandomenico Basso					8				11	11
35	(United Kingdom) Matthew Edwards							8		11	11
36	(Poland) Jaroslaw Szeja								8	11	11
37	(Estonia) Gregor Jeets				9^{5}					10	10
38	(Poland) Jakub Matulka							10	13	10	10
39	(Czech Republic) Jan Kopecký						9			9	9
40	(United Kingdom) Meirion Evans							9	Ret	9	9
41	(Poland) Zbigniew Gabrys								9	9	9
42	(Hungary) Martin László	13	Ret			16	11			8	8
43	(Spain) Yeray Lemes		10							7	7
44	(Czech Republic) Václav Pech						10			7	7
45	(United Kingdom) Philip Allen								10	7	7
46	(Sweden) Mille Johansson							12	14	7	7
47	(Poland) Jarosław Kołtun					18	15		12^{5}	6	6
48	(Lithuania) Vladas Jurkevičius	11								5	5
49	(Sweden) Johan Kristoffersson			11						5	5
50	(Finland) Teemu Asunmaa				11					5	5
51	(United Kingdom) Max McRae							11		5	5
52	(Poland) Lukasz Byskiniewicz								11	5	5
53	(Hungary) Frigyes Turán	12								4	4
54	(Sweden) Kalle Gustafsson			12						4	4
55	(Japan) Yuki Yamamoto				12					4	4
56	(Italy) Roberto Daprà					12				4	4
57	(Germany) Albert von Thurn und Taxis		22				13	Ret		3	3
58	(Spain) Enrique Cruz		13							3	3
59	(Hungary) Ferenc Vincze Jr.					13				3	3
60	(Republic of Ireland) William Creighton							13		3	3
61	(Italy) Giacomo Costenaro	14	Ret	16	31					2	2
62	(Cyprus) Alexey Lukyanuk		14							2	2
63	(Italy) Giacomo Scattalon					14				2	2
64	(Czech Republic) Aleš Jirásek						14			2	2
65	(Poland) Michal Chorbinski							14		2	2
66	(Hungary) Kristóf Klausz	15								1	1
67	(Norway) Petter Solberg			15						1	1
68	(Estonia) Kaspar Kasari				15					1	1
69	(Czech Republic) Filip Kohn							15		1	1
70	(Poland) Piotr Krotoszynski								15	1	1

Key
Colour	Result
Gold	Winner
Silver	2nd place
Bronze	3rd place
Green	Points finish
Blue	Non-points finish
Blue	Non-classified finish (NC)
Purple	Did not finish (Ret)
Black	Excluded (EX)
Black	Disqualified (DSQ)
White	Did not start (DNS)
White	Cancelled (C)
Blank	Withdrew entry from the event (WD)

Notes:
^{1 2 3 4 5} – Power Stage position

==== ERC3 ====
Pos	Driver	HUN (Hungary)	CAN (Spain)	SWE (Sweden)	EST (Estonia)	ITA (Italy)	CZE (Czech Republic)	GBR (United Kingdom)	POL (Poland)	Points	Best 7
1	(Czech Republic) Filip Kohn	1		1	5	1	1	3		158	158
2	(Turkey) Kerem Kazaz	4	2	3	4	3	2			128	128
3	(Poland) Igor Widłak	2	1	4	6	Ret	4			107	107
4	(Croatia) Martin Ravenščak	3		5	7	5	3			89	89
5	(Estonia) Romet Jürgenson				1					30	30
6	(France) Tristan Charpentier			2	Ret					24	24
7	(Estonia) Patrick Enok				2					24	24
8	(Poland) Hubert Kowalczyk					2				24	24
9	(Estonia) Joosep Ralf Nõgene				3					21	21
10	(Bulgaria) Aleksandar Tomov					4				19	19
10	(Slovakia) Róbert Kolčák						5			17	17

==== ERC4 ====
Pos	Driver	HUN (Hungary)	CAN (Spain)	SWE (Sweden)	EST (Estonia)	ITA (Italy)	CZE (Czech Republic)	GBR (United Kingdom)	POL (Poland)	Points	Best 7
1	(Sweden) Mille Johansson	4	1	1	3					100	100
2	(Czech Republic) Daniel Polášek	10	5	4	8		2			78	78
3	(Sweden) Calle Carlberg	Ret	2	2	2					72	72
4	(Hungary) Patrik Herczig	Ret	8	6	6		1			71	71
5	(Hungary) Márton Bertalan	2			Ret	2	3			69	69
6	(United Kingdom) Max McRae	1	4	9	12					62	62
7	(Germany) Timo Schulz	Ret	3	5	5					55	55
8	(Estonia) Karl-Markus Sei	Ret	7	3	4					53	53
9	(Estonia) Jaspar Vaher	3			1					51	51
10	(Republic of Ireland) Aoife Raftery	5	9	7	9					48	48
11	(Romania) Ciprian Lupu					5	4			36	36
12	(Italy) Giorgio Cogni					1				30	30
13	(Germany) Liam Müller	9	6	Ret						24	24
14	(Italy) Michael Rendina					3				21	21
15	(Italy) Davide Pesavento	7	Ret		10	Ret				20	20
16	(Bulgaria) Ekaterina Stratieva		Ret			4	Ret			19	19
17	(Republic of Ireland) Jack Brennan	6	Ret							15	15
18	(Finland) Tuomas Välilä	Ret			7					13	13
19	(Austria) Alfred Kramer	8								11	11
20	(Norway) Lie-Nilsen Herman			8						11	11
21	(Italy) Mattia Zanin	Ret	10	Ret	Ret					7	7
22	(Italy) Geronimo Nerobutto	11	Ret	Ret						5	5
23	(Sweden) Adam Grahn				11					5	5

==== Junior ERC ====
Pos	Driver	HUN (Hungary)	CAN (Spain)	SWE (Sweden)	EST (Estonia)	GBR (United Kingdom)	POL (Poland)	Points	Best 5
1	(Sweden) Mille Johansson	3	1	1	3	2		126	126
2	(United Kingdom) Max McRae	1	4	9	11	1		93	93
3	(Sweden) Calle Carlberg	Ret	2	2	2	4		89	89
4	(Germany) Timo Schulz	Ret	3	5	5	3		76	76
5	(Czech Republic) Daniel Polášek	9	5	4	7	6		71	71
6	(Republic of Ireland) Aoife Raftery	4	9	7	8	7		63	63
7	(Estonia) Jaspar Vaher	2			1			54	54
8	(Estonia) Karl-Markus Sei	Ret	7	3	4			53	53
9	(Italy) Davide Pesavento	6	Ret	Ret	9	4		43	43
10	(Hungary) Patrik Herczig	Ret	8	6	6			41	41
11	(Germany) Liam Müller	8	6	Ret				26	26
12	(Republic of Ireland) Jack Brennan	5	Ret					17	17
13	(Austria) Alfred Kramer	7						13	13
14	(Norway) Lie-Nilsen Herman			8				11	11
15	(Italy) Mattia Zanin	Ret	10		Ret			7	7
16	(Italy) Geronimo Nerobutto	10	Ret	Ret				7	7
17	(Sweden) Adam Grahn				10			7	7

=== Co-Drivers' championships ===
==== ERC ====
Pos	Driver	HUN (Hungary)	CAN (Spain)	SWE (Sweden)	EST (Estonia)	ITA (Italy)	CZE (Czech Republic)	GBR (United Kingdom)	POL (Poland)	Points	Best 7
1	(New Zealand) John Kennard	4	6^{5}	3	5					73	73
2	(France) Andy Malfoy	2^{1}	2^{3}	Ret	10					63	63
3	(Sweden) Patrik Barth	DNS	8	5^{3}	4^{3}					53	53
4	(Republic of Ireland) Eoin Tracy	8^{5}	7	Ret	6^{4}					42	42
5	(Romania) Sergiu Itu	1^{3}		10	Ret					40	40
6	(Poland) Szymon Gospodarczyk	6	19	8^{5}	7					40	40
7	(United Kingdom) Elliott Edmondson			1^{1}						35	35
8	(United Kingdom) James Morgan				1^{1}					35	35
9	(Italy) Virginia Lenzi	7^{4}	17	9	8					35	35
10	(France) Benjamin Boulloud		1^{4}							32	32
11	(Finland) Kristian Temonen	Ret		2^{2}	Ret					28	28
12	(United Kingdom) Craig Drew				2^{2}					28	28
13	(Spain) Borja Rozada		3^{1}							26	26
14	(Hungary) Attila Nagy	3^{2}	Ret							25	25
15	(Spain) Ángel Vela		4^{2}							23	23
16	(Latvia) Andris Mālnieks				3					21	21
17	(Norway) Lars-Håkon Lundgreen			4^{4}						21	21
18	(Slovakia) Igor Bacigál	5	14							19	19
19	(Spain) Alberto Iglesias		5							17	17
20	(Latvia) Renārs Francis	Ret	23	6	14					17	17
21	(Austria) Gerald Winter	9	10							16	16
22	(Sweden) Stefan Gustavsson			7						13	13
23	(Czech Republic) Radovan Bucha	10	15	13						11	11
24	(Estonia) Timo Taniel				9^{5}					10	10
25	(Spain) Rogelio Peñate		9							9	9
26	(Spain) Sara Fernández	Ret	11	14						7	7
27	(Lithuania) Aisvydas Paliukėnas	11								5	5
28	(Norway) Stig Rune Skjærmoen			11						5	5
29	(Finland) Ville Mannisenmäki				11					5	5
30	(Hungary) Gábor Zsiros	12								4	4
31	(Spain) Yeray Mújica		12							4	4
32	(Sweden) Magnus Nilsson			12						4	4
33	(Finland) Marko Salminen				12					4	4
34	(Hungary) Viktor Bán	13	Ret							3	3
35	(Cyprus) Yuriy Kulikov		13							3	3
36	(Norway) Torstein Eriksen				13					3	3
37	(United Kingdom) Justin Bardini	14	Ret							2	2
38	(Hungary) Tamás Papp	15								1	1
39	(Sweden) Jonas Andersson			15						1	1
40	(Estonia) Rainis Randma				15					1	1

==== ERC3 ====
Pos	Driver	HUN (Hungary)	CAN (Spain)	SWE (Sweden)	EST (Estonia)	ITA (Italy)	CZE (Czech Republic)	GBR (United Kingdom)	POL (Poland)	Points	Best 7
1	(United Kingdom) Tom Woodburn	1		1	5					77	77
2	(Croatia) Dora Ravenščak	3		5	7					51	51
3	(Poland) Daniel Dymurski		1	4						49	49
4	(Portugal) Hugo Magalhães		2		4					43	43
5	(Latvia) Andris Mālnieks	4		3						40	40
6	(Poland) Michał Marczewski	2			6					39	39
7	(Estonia) Siim Oja				1					30	30
8	(France) Florian Barral			2						24	24
9	(Estonia) Silver Simm				2					24	24
10	(Estonia) Aleks Lesk				3					21	21

==== ERC4 ====
Pos	Driver	HUN (Hungary)	CAN (Spain)	SWE (Sweden)	EST (Estonia)	ITA (Italy)	CZE (Czech Republic)	GBR (United Kingdom)	POL (Poland)	Points	Best 7
1	(Sweden) Johan Grönvall	4	1	1	3					100	100
2	(Norway) Jørgen Eriksen	Ret	2	2	2					72	72
3	(United Kingdom) Cameron Fair	1	4	9	12					62	62
4	(Germany) Michael Wenzel	Ret	3	5	5					55	55
5	(Czech Republic) Zdeněk Omelka	10	5	4	8					54	54
6	(Estonia) Martin Leotoots	Ret	7	3	4					53	53
7	(Estonia) Sander Pruul	3			1					51	51
8	(Republic of Ireland) Hannah McKillop	5	9	7	9					48	48
9	(Hungary) Kristóf Varga	Ret	8	6	6					41	41
10	(Hungary) Róbert Paizs	2			Ret					24	24
11	(Germany) Alexander Hirsch	9	6	Ret						24	24
12	(Republic of Ireland) John McGrath	6	Ret							15	15
13	(Italy) Matteo Zaramella	7	Ret							13	13
14	(Finland) Päivi Välilä	Ret			7					13	13
15	(Denmark) Jeannette Kvick	8								11	11
16	(Norway) Vegard Halland			8						11	11
17	(Italy) Elia De Guio	Ret	10	Ret	Ret					7	7
18	(Italy) Flavio Zanella			Ret	10					7	7
19	(Italy) Alessio Angeli	11	Ret							5	5
20	(Sweden) Marcus Sundh				11					5	5

=== Teams' championship ===
Pos	Team	HUN (Hungary)	CAN (Spain)	SWE (Sweden)	EST (Estonia)	ITA (Italy)	CZE (Czech Republic)	GBR (United Kingdom)	POL (Poland)	Points
1	(Italy) BRC Racing Team	1	4	1	3	2	9	1	2	191
1	(Italy) BRC Racing Team								7	191
2	(India) Team MRF Tyres	3	7	3	4	Ret	12	2	1	167
2	(India) Team MRF Tyres	Ret	11	5	7				Ret	167
3	(Hungary) TRT Rally Team	12	5	2	2	12		5	9	102
3	(Hungary) TRT Rally Team	DNS	17	17	21				13	102
6	Eurosol Racing Team Hungary	4	6			4	2		12	81
5	(Czech Republic) ACCR Toyota Dolák	5	10	7		7	5			67
6	(Estonia) RedGrey Team				1			7		63
6	(Estonia) RedGrey Team				5			13		63
7	(Czech Republic) ACCR Orsák Rally Sport	2	9			11	3		14	61
8	(Spain) Toyota España		1							30
9	(Spain) Citroën Rally Team		2							24
10	(Spain) Recalvi Team		3							21
10	(Spain) Recalvi Team		Ret							21
11	(Sweden) JC Raceteknik			4						19
12	(Lithuania) Eldorado x Humbility Sports	6								15
13	(Sweden) Kristoffersson Motorsport			6						15
14	(Japan) Toyota Gazoo Racing WRT NG				6					15
15	(Slovenia) IK Sport Racing	15	14	8	15					15
16	(Turkey) Atölye Kazaz	14	20	9	12					15
17	(Hungary) Turán Motorsport SE	7								13
18	(Germany) ADAC Opel Rallye Junior Team	Ret	15	10	14					13
18	(Germany) ADAC Opel Rallye Junior Team	Ret	16	13	18					13
19	(Estonia) LightGrey				10					12
19	(Estonia) LightGrey				11					12
20	(Hungary) Topp-Cars Rally Team	8	Ret							11
21	(Spain) C.D. Copi Sport		8							11
22	(Estonia) OT Racing				8					11
23	(Poland) Grupa PGS RT	11	17	11	17					10
24	(Hungary) Klaus Motorsport	9								9
25	Team Estonia Autosport				9					9
26	(Hungary) Kole Média Center Kft.	10								7
27	M-Sport Poland	13			13					6
28	(Spain) Hyundai Motor España		12							4
29	(Estonia) ALM Motorsport		18	12	16					4
30	(Spain) Hyundai Motor España -AresRacing-		13							3
31	(Hungary) HRT Racing Kft.		21	14	19					2
31	(Hungary) HRT Racing Kft.			16	Ret					2
32	(Republic of Ireland) Motorsport Ireland Rally Academy	16	22	15	20					1
32	(Republic of Ireland) Motorsport Ireland Rally Academy	17								1

=== Tyre suppliers' championship ===
Pos	Tyre supplier	HUN (Hungary)	CAN (Spain)	SWE (Sweden)	EST (Estonia)	ITA (Italy)	CZE (Czech Republic)	GBR (United Kingdom)	POL (Poland)	Points
1	(France) Michelin	1	1	2	1	3	2	3	4	325
1	(France) Michelin	2	2	4	4	4	3	4	5	325
2	(Italy) Pirelli	3	3	1	2	1	5	1	2	322
2	(Italy) Pirelli	4	4	3	3	2	6	5	3	322
3	(India) MRF	5	5	5	5	5	2	7	1	221
3	(India) MRF	8	7	6	6	7			6	221
4	(South Korea) Hankook	6	6	7		6	1			120
4	(South Korea) Hankook	7					4			120
