= Georg Linnamäe =

Estonian rally driver

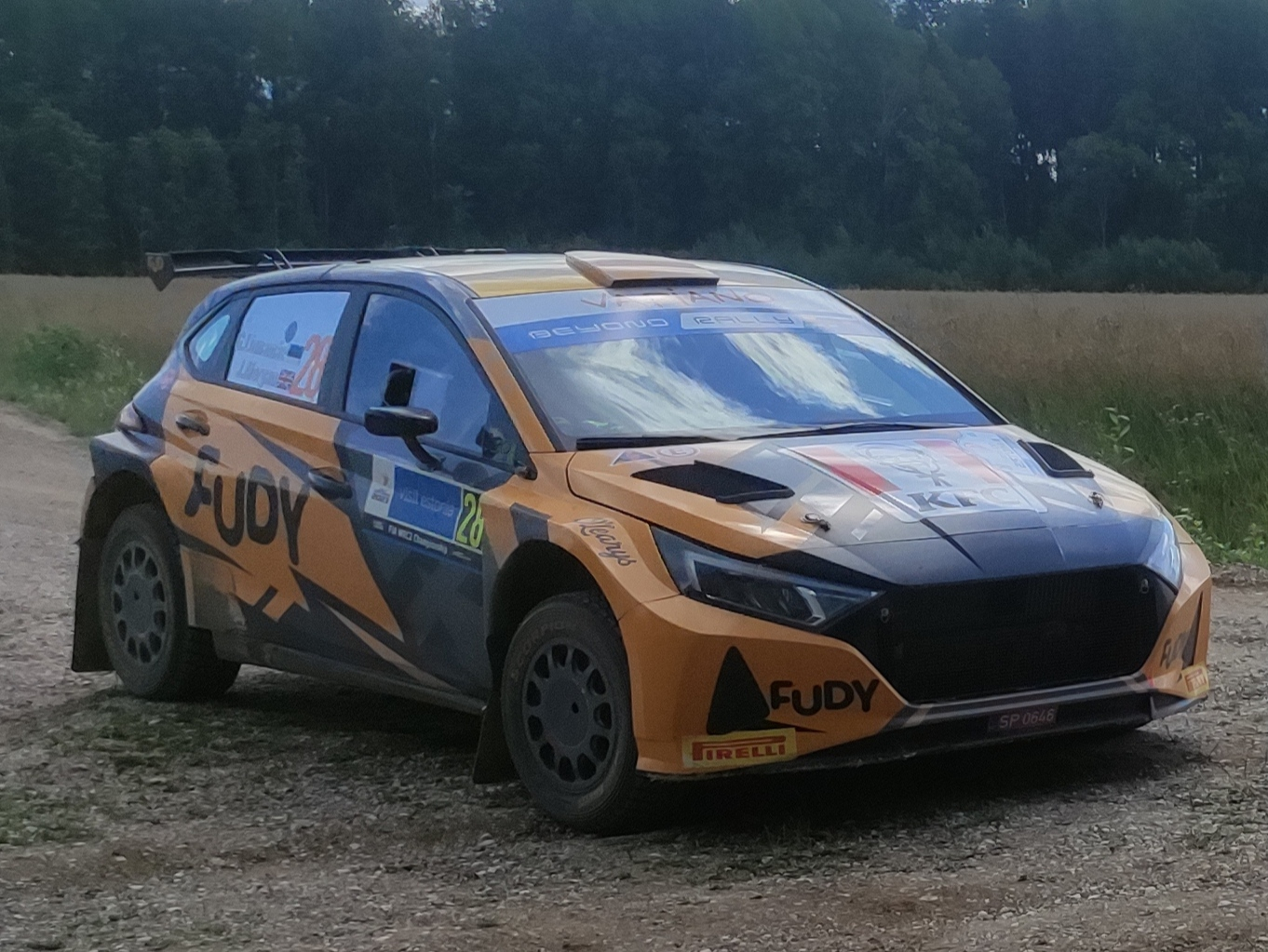
- Linnamäe at 2023 Rally Estonia

Personal information
- Nationality: (Estonia) Estonian
- Born: 8 July 1998 (age 28); Tallinn, Estonia

World Rally Championship record
- Years active: 2019–present
- Co-driver: (United Kingdom) James Morgan
- Rallies: 37
- Championships: 0
- Rally wins: 0
- Podiums: 0
- Stage wins: 1
- Total points: 7
- First rally: 2019 Rally de Portugal

Georg Linnamäe
Medal record
Representing Estonia
FIA Motorsport Games
Bronze medal – third place	2022 France	Rally Cup

Georg Linnamäe (born 8 July 1998) is an Estonian rally driver. He is currently competing in World Rally Championship-2.

Linnamäe participated at the 2022 FIA Motorsport Games in Rally2 and won a bronze medal.

== Rally victories ==
=== WRC-2 Junior victories ===
#	Event	Season	Co-driver	Car	Ref.
1	2022 Rally Sweden	2022	(United Kingdom) James Morgan	Volkswagen Polo GTI R5	

=== ERC victories ===
#	Event	Season	Co-driver	Car
1	2024 Rally Estonia	2024	(United Kingdom) James Morgan	Toyota GR Yaris Rally2

=== Other notable victories ===
#	Event	Season	Co-driver	Car
1	(Belgium) 69th Rallye des Ardennes	2023	(United Kingdom) James Morgan	Hyundai i20 N Rally2
2	Rally Estonia National 2023	2023	(United Kingdom) James Morgan	Hyundai i20 N Rally2

== Results ==
=== WRC results ===
Year	Entrant	Car	1	2	3	4	5	6	7	8	9	10	11	12	13	14	Pos.	Points
2019	ALM Motorsport	Peugeot 208 R2	MON	SWE	MEX	FRA	ARG	CHL	POR; 30	ITA	FIN	GER	TUR	GBR	ESP; 35	AUS; C	NC	0
2020	ALM Motorsport	Peugeot 208 R2	MON	SWE; 39													NC	0
2020	ALM Motorsport	Volkswagen Polo GTI R5			MEX	EST; 42	TUR	ITA	ITA								NC	0
2021	ALM Motorsport	Volkswagen Polo GTI R5	MON	ARC; 37	CRO	POR	ITA; Ret	KEN	EST; 18	BEL	GRE; 15	FIN; 17	ESP; 21	MNZ; 20			NC	0
2022	ALM Motorsport	Volkswagen Polo GTI R5	MON	SWE; 11	CRO; 37	POR; Ret	ITA; Ret	KEN	EST; 15	FIN	BEL; Ret	GRE; 21	NZL	ESP; 23	JPN		NC	0
2023	Georg Linnamäe	Hyundai i20 N Rally2	MON	SWE; 12	MEX	CRO; 32	POR; 41	ITA; 25	KEN	EST; 39	FIN; 12	GRE; Ret	CHL	EUR; Ret	JPN		NC	0
2024	Georg Linnamäe	Toyota GR Yaris Rally2	MON	SWE; 7	KEN	CRO; Ret	POR; 15	ITA; 52	POL; 12	LAT	FIN; 10	GRE; 44	CHL	EUR	JPN		20th	7
2025	Georg Linnamäe	Toyota GR Yaris Rally2	MON	SWE; 35	KEN	ESP; 17	POR; 57	ITA	GRE; Ret	EST; 12	FIN	PAR	CHL	EUR	JPN	SAU	NC*	0*

* Season still in progress.

=== WRC-2 results ===
Year	Entrant	Car	1	2	3	4	5	6	7	8	9	10	11	12	13	14	Pos.	Points
2021	ALM Motorsport	Volkswagen Polo GTI R5	MON	ARC; 8	CRO	POR	ITA; Ret	KEN	EST; 6	BEL	GRE; 4	FIN; 5	ESP; 6	MNZ			12th	45
2022	ALM Motorsport	Volkswagen Polo GTI R5	MON	SWE; 5	CRO; 21	POR; Ret	ITA; Ret	KEN	EST; 7	FIN	BEL	GRE; 12	NZL	ESP; 13	JPN		21st	18
2023	Georg Linnamäe	Hyundai i20 N Rally2	MON	SWE; 4	MEX	CRO; 13	POR; 26	ITA	KEN	EST; 17	FIN; 6	GRE; Ret	CHL	EUR; Ret	JPN		19th	20
2024	Georg Linnamäe	Toyota GR Yaris Rally2	MON	SWE; 3	KEN	CRO	POR; 8	ITA; 27	POL; 4	LAT	FIN; 5	GRE; 19	CHL	EUR	JPN		12th	41
2025	Georg Linnamäe	Toyota GR Yaris Rally2	MON	SWE; 14	KEN	ESP	POR; 30	ITA	GRE; Ret	EST; 2	FIN	PAR	CHL	EUR	JPN	SAU	15th*	17*

* Season still in progress.

=== WRC-2 Junior/Challenger results ===
Year	Entrant	Car	1	2	3	4	5	6	7	8	9	10	11	12	13	14	Pos.	Points
2022	ALM Motorsport	Volkswagen Polo GTI R5	MON	SWE; 1	CRO; 8	POR; Ret	ITA; Ret	KEN	EST; 2	FIN	BEL	GRE; 4	NZL	ESP; 9	JPN		7th	61
2023	Georg Linnamäe	Hyundai i20 N Rally2	MON	SWE; 2	MEX	CRO; 8	POR; 20	ITA	KEN	EST; 14	FIN; 4	GRE; Ret	CHL	EUR; Ret	JPN		12th	32
2024	Georg Linnamäe	Toyota GR Yaris Rally2	MON	SWE; 2	KEN	CRO	POR; 7	ITA; 25	POL; 3	LAT	FIN; 3	GRE	CHL	EUR	JPN		9th	54
2025	Georg Linnamäe	Toyota GR Yaris Rally2	MON	SWE; 12	KEN	ESP	POR; 26	ITA	GRE; Ret	EST; 2	FIN; Ret	PAR	CHL	EUR	JPN	SAU	14th*	17*

* Season still in progress.

=== ERC results ===
Year	Entrant	Car	1	2	3	4	5	6	7	8	Pos.	Points
2021	ALM Motorsport	Volkswagen Polo GTI R5	POL; WD	LAT; 12	ITA	CZE	PRT1	PRT2	HUN	ESP	53rd	4
2022	ALM Motorsport	Volkswagen Polo GTI R5	PRT1; 3	PRT2	ESP1	POL	LAT	ITA	CZE	ESP2	24th	22
2023	RedGrey Team	Hyundai i20 N Rally2	PRT; 3	CAN	POL	LAT; 8	SWE	ITA	CZE	HUN	14th	35
2024	RedGrey Team	Toyota GR Yaris Rally2	HUN	CAN	SWE	EST; 1	ITA	CZE	GBR	POL	13th	35
