= 2024 Rali Ceredigion =

4th edition of Rali Ceredigion

2024 Rali Ceredigion JDS Machinery Rali Ceredigion 2024
Round 7 of 8 in the 2024 European Rally Championship
← Previous event	Next event →
- Host country: United Kingdom
- Rally base: Aberystwyth, Ceredigion, Wales
- Dates run: 30 August – 1 September 2024
- Start location: Aberystwyth, Ceredigion, Wales
- Finish location: Aberystwyth, Ceredigion, Wales
- Stages: 14 (184.16 km; 114.43 miles)
- Stage surface: Tarmac
- Transport distance: 468.27 km (290.97 miles)
- Overall distance: 652.43 km (405.40 miles)

Statistics
- Crews registered: 128 (31 in ERC, 19 in BRC)
- Crews: 128 at start, TBA at finish

Overall results
- Overall winner: TBA; TBA; TBA; TBA
- Power Stage winner: TBA; TBA; TBA; TBA

The 2024 Rali Ceredigion was a motor racing event for rally cars held over three days from 30 August to 1 September 2024. It marked the fourth running of Rali Ceredigion. The event was the seventh round of the 2024 European Rally Championship and the fifth round of the 2024 British Rally Championship. It was also the first ERC event held in United Kingdom since the 2016 Circuit of Ireland. The event was held in Aberystwyth of Ceredigion county in Wales and was contested over fourteen special stages covering a total of 184,16 km.

Mille Johansson's 2nd place in class was enough for him to win the ERC Junior title and effectively secure a JWRC drive for 2025. Filip Kohn also claimed the ERC3 title after winning the Fiesta Rally3 Trophy on the previous event.

== Background ==
=== Entry list ===
A total of 128 crews entered the event, with 31 competing in ERC and 19 competing in BRC. In ERC, there is 17 crews competing under Rally2 regulations, 4 crews under Rally3 regulations in ERC3 and 10 crews under Rally4 regulations in ERC4 with 8 of them also competing in ERC Junior. In BRC, there was 9 crews competing under Rally2 regulations, 1 crew competing under Rally3 regulations and 9 crews competing under Rally4 regulations, with 8 of them competing in the Great Britain Junior championship and 4 of them competing in Stellanis Cup IRE/UK championship.

==== ERC entry list ====
ERC Rally2 entries
No.	Driver	Co-Driver	Entrant	Car	Championship eligibility	Tyre
1	(New Zealand) Hayden Paddon	(New Zealand) John Kennard	(Italy) BRC Racing Team	Hyundai i20 N Rally2	Driver, co-driver, team	P
2	(France) Mathieu Franceschi	(France) Andy Malfoy	(France) Mathieu Franceschi	Škoda Fabia RS Rally2	Driver, co-driver	MI
3	(Poland) Mikołaj Marczyk	(Poland) Szymon Gospodarczyk	(Poland) Mikołaj Marczyk	Škoda Fabia RS Rally2	Driver, co-driver	MI
4	(Italy) Andrea Mabellini	(Italy) Virginia Lenzi	(India) Team MRF Tyres	Škoda Fabia RS Rally2	Driver, co-driver, team	MR
5	(Republic of Ireland) Jon Armstrong	(Republic of Ireland) Eoin Treacy	(Republic of Ireland) Jon Armstrong	Ford Fiesta Rally2	Driver, co-driver	P
6	(Republic of Ireland) William Creighton	(Republic of Ireland) Liam Regan	(Estonia) RedGrey Team	Ford Fiesta Rally2	Driver, co-driver, team	P
7	(United Kingdom) Osian Pryce	(United Kingdom) Rhodri Evans	(United Kingdom) Osian Pryce	Ford Fiesta Rally2	Driver, co-driver	MI
8	(United Kingdom) Chris Ingram	(United Kingdom) Alexander Kihurani	(United Kingdom) Chris Ingram	Toyota GR Yaris Rally2	Driver, co-driver	MI
9	(Republic of Ireland) Keith Cronin	(Republic of Ireland) Mikie Galvin	Eurosol Racing Team Hungary	Ford Fiesta Rally2	Driver, co-driver, team	P
10	(United Kingdom) Matt Edwards	(Republic of Ireland) David Moynihan	(Turkey) Atölye Kazaz	Ford Fiesta Rally2	Driver, co-driver, team	P
11	(Republic of Ireland) Callum Devine	(Republic of Ireland) Noel O'Sullivan jr	(Republic of Ireland) Callum Devine	Škoda Fabia RS Rally2	Driver, co-driver	MI
12	(United Kingdom) Meirion Evans	(United Kingdom) Jonathan Jackson	(United Kingdom) Meirion Evans	Toyota GR Yaris Rally2	Driver, co-driver	MI
14	(United Kingdom) James Williams	(United Kingdom) Ross Whittock	(Italy) BRC Racing Team	Hyundai i20 N Rally2	Driver, co-driver	P
15	(United Kingdom) Garry Pearson	(United Kingdom) Daniel Barritt	(Estonia) RedGrey Team	Ford Fiesta Rally2	Driver, co-driver, team	P
16	(United Kingdom) Philip Allen	(United Kingdom) Craig Drew	(United Kingdom) Philip Allen	Škoda Fabia RS Rally2	Driver, co-driver	MI
17	(Germany) Albert von Thurn und Taxis	(Germany) Frank Christian	(Germany) Albert von Thurn und Taxis	Škoda Fabia RS Rally2	Driver, co-driver	P
18 (Note: Amaury Molle and Alex Dubois were set to compete for Team MRF Tyres, but withdrew after the crash during Barum Czech Rally Zlín.)	(Romania) Simone Tempestini	(Romania) Sergiu Itu	(India) Team MRF Tyres	Volkswagen Polo GTI R5	Driver, co-driver, team	MR
ERC3 entries
19	(Czech Republic) Filip Kohn	(United Kingdom) Tom Woodburn	(Czech Republic) Filip Kohn	Ford Fiesta Rally3	Driver, co-driver, ERC3	P
20 (Note: Igor Widłak was set to drive, but withdrew due to illness and was replaced by Chorbiński.)	(Poland) Michał Chorbiński	(Poland) Michał Marczewski	(Poland) Grupa PGS RT	Ford Fiesta Rally3	Driver, co-driver, team, ERC3	P
21 (Note: Withdrew before the event.)	(Bulgaria) Aleksandar Tomov	(Bulgaria) Dimitar Spasov	(Bulgaria) Aleksandar Tomov	Renault Clio Rally3	Driver, co-driver, ERC3	P
22	(Poland) Jakub Matulka	(Poland) Daniel Dymurski	M-Sport Poland	Ford Fiesta Rally3	Driver, co-driver, team, ERC3	P
23	(Republic of Ireland) Eamonn Kelly	(Republic of Ireland) Rory Kennedy	(Republic of Ireland) LightGrey	Ford Fiesta Rally3	Driver, co-driver, ERC3	P
ERC4 entries
24	(Sweden) Mille Johansson	(Sweden) Johan Grönvall	(Slovenia) IK Sport Racing	Opel Corsa Rally4	Driver, co-driver, team, ERC4, ERC Junior	HK
25	(Sweden) Calle Carlberg	(Norway) Jørgen Eriksen	(Germany) ADAC Opel Rallye Junior Team	Opel Corsa Rally4	Driver, co-driver, team, ERC4, ERC Junior	HK
26	(United Kingdom) Max McRae	(United Kingdom) Cameron Fair	(Hungary) TRT Rally Team	Peugeot 208 Rally4	Driver, co-driver, team, ERC4, ERC Junior	HK
27	(Czech Republic) Daniel Polášek	(Czech Republic) Zdeněk Omelka	(Czech Republic) Daniel Polášek	Peugeot 208 Rally4	Driver, co-driver, ERC4, ERC Junior	HK
28	(Germany) Timo Schulz	(Germany) Michael Wenzel	(Germany) ADAC Opel Rallye Junior Team	Opel Corsa Rally4	Driver, co-driver, team, ERC4, ERC Junior	HK
29	(Republic of Ireland) Aoife Raftery	(Republic of Ireland) Hannah McKillop	(Republic of Ireland) Motorsport Ireland Rally Academy	Peugeot 208 Rally4	Driver, co-driver, team, ERC4, ERC Junior	HK
30	(Italy) Davide Pesavento	(Italy) Flavio Zanella	(Italy) Davide Pesavento	Peugeot 208 Rally4	Driver, co-driver, ERC4, ERC Junior	HK
31	(Republic of Ireland) Jack Brennan	(Republic of Ireland) John McGrath	(Republic of Ireland) Motorsport Ireland Rally Academy	Peugeot 208 Rally4	Driver, co-driver, team, ERC4, ERC Junior	HK
32	(Republic of Ireland) Kyle McBride	(Republic of Ireland) Darragh Mullen	(Republic of Ireland) Motorsport Ireland Rally Academy	Opel Corsa Rally4	Driver, co-driver, team, ERC4	MI
33	(United Kingdom) Ioan Lloyd	(United Kingdom) Sion Williams	(United Kingdom) Ioan Lloyd	Peugeot 208 Rally4	Driver, co-driver, ERC4	MI

==== BRC entry list ====
BRC entries
No.	Driver	Co-Driver	Entrant	Car	Championship eligibility	Tyre
5	(Republic of Ireland) Jon Armstrong	(Republic of Ireland) Eoin Treacy	(Republic of Ireland) Jon Armstrong	Ford Fiesta Rally2		P
6	(Republic of Ireland) William Creighton	(Republic of Ireland) Liam Regan	(Estonia) RedGrey Team	Ford Fiesta Rally2		P
7	(United Kingdom) Osian Pryce	(United Kingdom) Rhodri Evans	(United Kingdom) Osian Pryce	Ford Fiesta Rally2		MI
8	(United Kingdom) Chris Ingram	(United Kingdom) Alexander Kihurani	(United Kingdom) Chris Ingram	Toyota GR Yaris Rally2		MI
9	(Republic of Ireland) Keith Cronin	(Republic of Ireland) Mikie Galvin	Eurosol Racing Team Hungary	Ford Fiesta Rally2		P
10	(United Kingdom) Matt Edwards	(Republic of Ireland) David Moynihan	(Turkey) Atölye Kazaz	Ford Fiesta Rally2		P
12	(United Kingdom) Meirion Evans	(United Kingdom) Jonathan Jackson	(United Kingdom) Meirion Evans	Toyota GR Yaris Rally2		MI
14	(United Kingdom) James Williams	(United Kingdom) Ross Whittock	(Italy) BRC Racing Team	Hyundai i20 N Rally2		P
15	(United Kingdom) Garry Pearson	(United Kingdom) Daniel Barritt	(Estonia) RedGrey Team	Ford Fiesta Rally2		P
23	(Republic of Ireland) Eamonn Kelly	(Republic of Ireland) Rory Kennedy	(Republic of Ireland) LightGrey	Ford Fiesta Rally3		P
32	(Republic of Ireland) Kyle McBride	(Republic of Ireland) Darragh Mullen	(Republic of Ireland) Motorsport Ireland Rally Academy	Opel Corsa Rally4		MI
33	(United Kingdom) Ioan Lloyd	(United Kingdom) Sion Williams	(United Kingdom) Ioan Lloyd	Peugeot 208 Rally4		MI
36	(Republic of Ireland) Ryan MacHugh	(Republic of Ireland) Arthur Kierans	(Republic of Ireland) Motorsport Ireland Rally Academy	Ford Fiesta Rally4		P
37	(Republic of Ireland) Keelan Grogan	(Republic of Ireland) Ayrton Sherlock	(Republic of Ireland) Motorsport Ireland Rally Academy	Peugeot 208 Rally4		MI
38	(Republic of Ireland) Cian Caldwell	(Republic of Ireland) Liam Egan	(Republic of Ireland) Motorsport Ireland Rally Academy	Ford Fiesta Rally4		MI
39	(United Kingdom) Robert Proudlock	(United Kingdom) Steven Brown	(United Kingdom) Robert Proudlock	Peugeot 208 Rally4		P
40	(Republic of Ireland) Kalum Graffin	(Republic of Ireland) Mark McGeehan	(Republic of Ireland) Kalum Graffin	Peugeot 208 Rally4		MI
43	(United Kingdom) James Lightfoot	(Poland) Urszula Budzyńska	(United Kingdom) James Lightfoot	Ford Fiesta R2T		MI

==== Itinerary ====
All dates and times are BST (UTC+1).

Date	No.	Time span	Stage name	Distance
30 August	—	After 9:00	Cwmerfyn [Shakedown]	4.15 km
30 August		After 16:30	Opening ceremony, Aberystwyth	—N/a
30 August	SS1	After 18:05	LAS Recycling & Cambrian Training Aberystwyth 1	1.34 km
30 August	SS2	After 18:25	LAS Recycling & Cambrian Training Aberystwyth 2	1.34 km
30 August		6:40 - 6:55	Service A, Aberystwyth	—N/a
30 August	SS3	After 8:05	ETT Trailers Brechfa 1	19.75 km
30 August	SS4	After 9:25	Signature Systems Llyn Brianne 1	26.55 km
30 August	SS5	After 11:13	Caws Cenarth Nant y Moch 1	14.52 km
30 August		12:01 - 12:21	Regroup	—N/a
30 August		12:21 - 12:51	Service B, Aberystwyth	—N/a
30 August	SS6	After 14:01	ETT Trailers Brechfa 2	19.75 km
30 August	SS7	After 15:21	Signature Systems Llyn Brianne 2	26.55 km
30 August		16:16 - 16:36	Regroup, Pontrhydfendigaid	—N/a
30 August	SS8	After 17:09	Caws Cenarth Nant y Moch 2	14.52 km
30 August	SS9	After 18:04	LAS Recycling & Cambrian Training Aberystwyth 3	1.34 km
30 August	SS10	After 18:24	LAS Recycling & Cambrian Training Aberystwyth 4	1.34 km
30 August		18:49 - 19:34	Service C, Aberystwyth	—N/a
1 September		7:45 - 8:00	Service D, Aberystwyth	—N/a
1 September	SS11	After 8:33	DC Autos Bethania 1	10.74 km
1 September	SS12	After 9:35	Spencer Quantum Hafod 1	17.84 km
1 September		10:32 - 11:02	Regroup	—N/a
1 September		11:02 - 11:32	Service E, Aberystwyth	—N/a
1 September	SS13	After 12:05	DC Autos Bethania 2	10.74 km
1 September		12:49 - 13:46	Regroup, Pontrhydfendigaid	—N/a
1 September	SS14	After 14:05	Spencer Quantum Hafod 2 (Power Stage)	17.84 km
1 September		After 15:05	Podium ceremony, Aberystwyth	—N/a
1 September		After 15:30	Finish	—N/a

== Report ==
=== ERC Rally2 ===
==== Classification ====
Position		No.	Driver	Co-driver	Entrant	Car	Time	Difference	Points	
Event	Class	No.	Driver	Co-driver	Entrant	Car	Time	Difference	Event	Power Stage
1	1	1	Hayden Paddon	John Kennard	BRC Racing Team	Hyundai i20 N Rally2	1:38:59.0	—N/a	30	5
2	2	4	Andrea Mabellini	Virginia Lenzi	Team MRF Tyres	Škoda Fabia RS Rally2	1:40:46.3	1:47.3	24	3
3	3	2	Mathieu Franceschi	Andy Malfoy	Mathieu Franceschi	Škoda Fabia RS Rally2	1:40:49.8	1:50.8	21	1
4	4	3	Mikołaj Marczyk	Szymon Gospodarczyk	Mikołaj Marczyk	Škoda Fabia RS Rally2	1:40:53.5	1:54.5	19	0
5	5	5	Jon Armstrong	Eoin Treacy	Jon Armstrong	Ford Fiesta Rally2	1:40:57.4	1:58.4	15	4
6	6	11	Callum Devine	Noel O'Sullivan jr	Callum Devine	Škoda Fabia RS Rally2	1:41:09.8	2:10.8	17	2
7	7	7	Osian Pryce	Rhodri Evans	Osian Pryce	Ford Fiesta Rally2	1:41:31.9	2:32.9	13	0
8	8	10	Matt Edwards	David Moynihan	Atölye Kazaz	Ford Fiesta Rally2	1:41:39.2	2:40.2	11	0
9	9	12	Meirion Evans	Jonathan Jackson	Meirion Evans	Toyota GR Yaris Rally2	1:42:08.1	3:09.1	9	0
13	10		William Creighton	Liam Regan	RedGrey Team	Ford Fiesta Rally2	1:48:19.8	9:20.8	3	0
23	11	16	Philip Allen	Craig Drew	Philip Allen	Škoda Fabia RS Rally2	1:55:37.5	16:38.5	0	0
24	12	15	Garry Pearson	Daniel Barritt	RedGrey Team	Ford Fiesta Rally2	1:55:53.9	16:54.9	0	0
Retired SS14		18	Simone Tempestini	Sergiu Itu	Team MRF Tyres	Volkswagen Polo GTI R5	Retired		0	0
Retired SS11		8	Chris Ingram	Alexander Kihurani	Chris Ingram	Toyota GR Yaris Rally2	Accident		0	0
Retired SS11		9	Keith Cronin	Mikie Galvin	Eurosol Racing Team Hungary	Ford Fiesta Rally2	Accident		0	0
Retired SS11		17	Albert von Thurn und Taxis	Frank Christian	Albert von Thurn und Taxis	Škoda Fabia RS Rally2	Medical reasons		0	0
Retired SS4		14	James Williams	Ross Whittock	BRC Racing Team	Hyundai i20 N Rally2	Accident		0	0

==== Stages ====
Stage	Winners	Car	Time	Class leaders
SD	Armstrong / Treacy	Ford Fiesta Rally2	2:29.231	—N/a
SS1	Paddon / Kennard	Hyundai i20 N Rally2	1:19.8	Paddon / Kennard
SS2	Paddon / Kennard	Hyundai i20 N Rally2	1:18.2	Paddon / Kennard
SS3	Williams / Whittock	Hyundai i20 N Rally2	10:18.8	Paddon / Kennard
SS4	Paddon / Kennard	Hyundai i20 N Rally2	13:29.6	Paddon / Kennard
SS5	Paddon / Kennard	Hyundai i20 N Rally2	7:27.5	Paddon / Kennard
SS6	Paddon / Kennard	Hyundai i20 N Rally2	10:04.2	Paddon / Kennard
SS7	Paddon / Kennard	Hyundai i20 N Rally2	13:22.6	Paddon / Kennard
SS8	Paddon / Kennard	Hyundai i20 N Rally2	7:25.5	Paddon / Kennard
SS9	Paddon / Kennard	Hyundai i20 N Rally2	1:18.1	Paddon / Kennard
SS10	Paddon / Kennard	Hyundai i20 N Rally2	1:17.6	Paddon / Kennard
SS11	Mabellini / Lenzi	Škoda Fabia RS Rally2	5:46.6	Paddon / Kennard
SS12	Armstrong / Treacy	Ford Fiesta Rally2	9:34.5	Paddon / Kennard
SS13	Edwards / Moynihan	Ford Fiesta Rally2	6:15.6	Paddon / Kennard
SS14	Paddon / Kennard	Hyundai i20 N Rally2	9:48.4	Paddon / Kennard

=== ERC3 ===
==== Classification ====
Position		No.	Driver	Co-driver	Entrant	Car	Time	Difference	Points
Event	Class	No.	Driver	Co-driver	Entrant	Car	Time	Difference	Points
10	1	22	Jakub Matulka	Daniel Dymurski	M-Sport Poland	Ford Fiesta Rally3	1:47:27.5	—N/a	30
14	2	20	Michał Chorbiński	Michał Marczewski	Grupa PGS RT	Ford Fiesta Rally3	1:48:53.2	1:25.7	24
15	3	19	Filip Kohn	Tom Woodburn	Filip Kohn	Ford Fiesta Rally3	1:48:56.2	1:28.7	21
Retired SS12		14	Eamonn Kelly	Rory Kennedy	LightGrey	Ford Fiesta Rally3	Accident		0

==== Stages ====
Stage	Winners	Car	Time	Class leaders
SD	Kelly / Kennedy	Ford Fiesta Rally3	2:39.1	—N/a
SS1	Kohn / Woodburn	Ford Fiesta Rally3	1:24.7	Kohn / Woodburn
SS2	Kohn / Woodburn	Ford Fiesta Rally3	1:24.4	Kohn / Woodburn
SS3	Matulka / Dymurski	Ford Fiesta Rally3	11:08.8	Matulka / Dymurski
SS4 (Note: Notional times applied after the accident of James Williams.)	—N/a	—N/a	—N/a	Matulka / Dymurski
SS5	Kelly / Kennedy	Ford Fiesta Rally3	8:04.6	Kelly / Kennedy
SS6	Kelly / Kennedy	Ford Fiesta Rally3	10:48.4	Kelly / Kennedy
SS7	Matulka / Dymurski	Ford Fiesta Rally3	14:35.8	Kelly / Kennedy
SS8	Kelly / Kennedy	Ford Fiesta Rally3	7:52.7	Kelly / Kennedy
SS9	Kohn / Woodburn	Ford Fiesta Rally3	1:23.8	Kelly / Kennedy
SS10	Kohn / Woodburn	Ford Fiesta Rally3	1:22.5	Kelly / Kennedy
SS11 (Note: Notional times applied after the accident of Chris Ingram.)	—N/a	—N/a	—N/a	Kelly / Kennedy
SS12 (Note: Notional times applied after the accident of Eamonn Kelly.)	—N/a	—N/a	—N/a	Matulka / Dymurski
SS13	Chorbiński / Marczewski	Ford Fiesta Rally3	6:56.5	Matulka / Dymurski
SS14	Matulka / Dymurski	Ford Fiesta Rally3	10:59.3	Matulka / Dymurski

=== ERC4 ===
==== Classification ====
Position		No.	Driver	Co-driver	Entrant	Car	Time	Difference	Points
Event	Class	No.	Driver	Co-driver	Entrant	Car	Time	Difference	Points
11	1	26	Max McRae	Cameron Fair	TRT Rally Team	Peugeot 208 Rally4	1:47:28.3	—N/a	30
12	2	24	Mille Johansson	Johan Grönvall	IK Sport Racing	Opel Corsa Rally4	1:48:14.7	46.4	24
16	3	28	Timo Schulz	Michael Wenzel	ADAC Opel Rallye Junior Team	Opel Corsa Rally4	1:49:05.1	50.4	21
17	4	30	Davide Pesavento	Flavio Zanella	Davide Pesavento	Peugeot 208 Rally4	1:49:42.6	2:14.3	19
18	5	33	Ioan Lloyd	Sion Williams	Ioan Lloyd	Peugeot 208 Rally4	1:49:48.3	2:20.0	17
19	6	25	Calle Carlberg	Jørgen Eriksen	ADAC Opel Rallye Junior Team	Opel Corsa Rally4	1:49:53.4	2:25.1	15
20	7	27	Daniel Polášek	Zdeněk Omelka	Daniel Polášek	Peugeot 208 Rally4	1:51:46.3	4:18.0	13
21	8	29	Aoife Raftery	Hannah McKillop	Motorsport Ireland Rally Academy	Peugeot 208 Rally4	1:53:04.1	5:35.8	11
22	9	32	Kyle McBride	Darragh Mullen	Motorsport Ireland Rally Academy	Opel Corsa Rally4	1:55:02.4	7:34.1	9
Retired SS13		31	Jack Brennan	John McGrath	Motorsport Ireland Rally Academy	Peugeot 208 Rally4	Off-road		0

==== Stages ====
Stage	Winners	Car	Time	Class leaders
SD	McRae / Fair	Peugeot 208 Rally4	2:40.2	—N/a
SS1	Schulz / Wenzel	Opel Corsa Rally4	1:27.1	Schulz / Wenzel
SS2	Schulz / Wenzel	Opel Corsa Rally4	1:24.8	Schulz / Wenzel
SS3	Carlberg / Eriksen	Opel Corsa Rally4	10:59.3	Carlberg / Eriksen
SS4	—N/a	—N/a	—N/a	Carlberg / Eriksen
SS5	Johansson / Grönvall	Opel Corsa Rally4	10:04.8	Carlberg / Eriksen
SS6	Johansson / Grönvall	Opel Corsa Rally4	10:48.1	Carlberg / Eriksen
SS7	Johansson / Grönvall	Opel Corsa Rally4	14:35.2	Johansson / Grönvall
SS8	Carlberg / Eriksen	Opel Corsa Rally4	7:57.6	Johansson / Grönvall
SS9	Carlberg / Eriksen	Opel Corsa Rally4	1:24.9	Johansson / Grönvall
SS10	Carlberg / Eriksen	Opel Corsa Rally4	1:24.1	Johansson / Grönvall
SS11	—N/a	—N/a	—N/a	Johansson / Grönvall
SS12	—N/a	—N/a	—N/a	Johansson / Grönvall
SS13	Carlberg / Eriksen	Opel Corsa Rally4	6:45.9	McRae / Fair
SS14	McRae / Fair	Peugeot 208 Rally4	10:50.7	McRae / Fair

=== BRC ===
There is two full points scoring opportunities on this rally as full championship points are available for both Leg 1 and Leg 2 of the rally.

==== Classification ====
Position	No.	Driver	Co-driver	Entrant	Car	Time	Difference	Points		
Position	No.	Driver	Co-driver	Entrant	Car	Time	Difference	Day 1	Day 2	Joker
1										
2										
3										
4										
5										
6										
7										
8										
9										
10										
11										
12										
13										
14										
15										
Retired SS11	8	Chris Ingram	Alexander Kihurani	Chris Ingram	Toyota GR Yaris Rally2	Accident				
Retired SS11	9	Keith Cronin	Mikie Galvin	Eurosol Racing Team Hungary	Ford Fiesta Rally2	Accident				
Retired SS7	37	Keelan Grogan	Ayrton Sherlock	Motorsport Ireland Rally Academy	Peugeot 208 Rally4	Off-road				
Retired SS4	14	James Williams	Ross Whittock	BRC Racing Team	Hyundai i20 N Rally2	Accident				

==== Stages ====
Stage	Winners	Car	Time	Class leaders
SD	Armstrong / Treacy	Ford Fiesta Rally2	2:29.2	
SS1	Ingram / Kihurani	Toyota GR Yaris Rally2	1:20.8	Ingram / Kihurani
SS2	Armstrong / Treacy	Ford Fiesta Rally2	1:19.7	Ingram / Kihurani
SS3	Williams / Whittock	Hyundai i20 N Rally2	10:18.8	Williams / Whittock
SS4	Ingram / Kihurani	Toyota GR Yaris Rally2	13:46.5	Ingram / Kihurani
SS5	Pryce / Evans	Ford Fiesta Rally2	7:35.5	Ingram / Kihurani
SS6	Armstrong / Treacy	Ford Fiesta Rally2	10:11.1	Ingram / Kihurani
SS7	Armstrong / Treacy	Ford Fiesta Rally2	13:30.0	Ingram / Kihurani
SS8	Armstrong / Treacy	Ford Fiesta Rally2	7:31.3	Ingram / Kihurani
SS9	Armstrong / Treacy	Ford Fiesta Rally2	1:19.8	Ingram / Kihurani
SS10	Armstrong / Treacy	Ford Fiesta Rally2	1:19.2	Ingram / Kihurani
SS11				
SS12				
SS13				
SS14				

=== BRC Junior ===
==== Classification ====
Position	No.	Driver	Co-driver	Entrant	Car	Time	Difference	Points		
Position	No.	Driver	Co-driver	Entrant	Car	Time	Difference	Day 1	Day 2	Joker
1										
2										
3										
4										
5										
6										
7										
8										
9										

==== Stages ====
Stage	Winners	Car	Time	Class leaders
SD				
SS1	Grogan / Sherlock	Peugeot 208 Rally4	1:30.0	Grogan / Sherlock
SS2	McBride / Mullen	Opel Corsa Rally4	1:28.6	Grogan / Sherlock
SS3	Lloyd / Williams	Peugeot 208 Rally4	11:24.4	Lloyd / Williams
SS4	—N/a	—N/a	—N/a	Lloyd / Williams
SS5	Lloyd / Williams	Peugeot 208 Rally4	8:16.1	Lloyd / Williams
SS6	Lloyd / Williams	Peugeot 208 Rally4	11:08.4	Lloyd / Williams
SS7	Lloyd / Williams	Peugeot 208 Rally4	14:59.6	Lloyd / Williams
SS8	Lloyd / Williams	Peugeot 208 Rally4	8:13.9	Lloyd / Williams
SS9	McBride / Mullen	Opel Corsa Rally4	1:28.5	Lloyd / Williams
SS10	McBride / Mullen	Opel Corsa Rally4	1:27.9	Lloyd / Williams
SS11				
SS12				
SS13				
SS14				
