= RedGrey Team =

Estonian rallying team

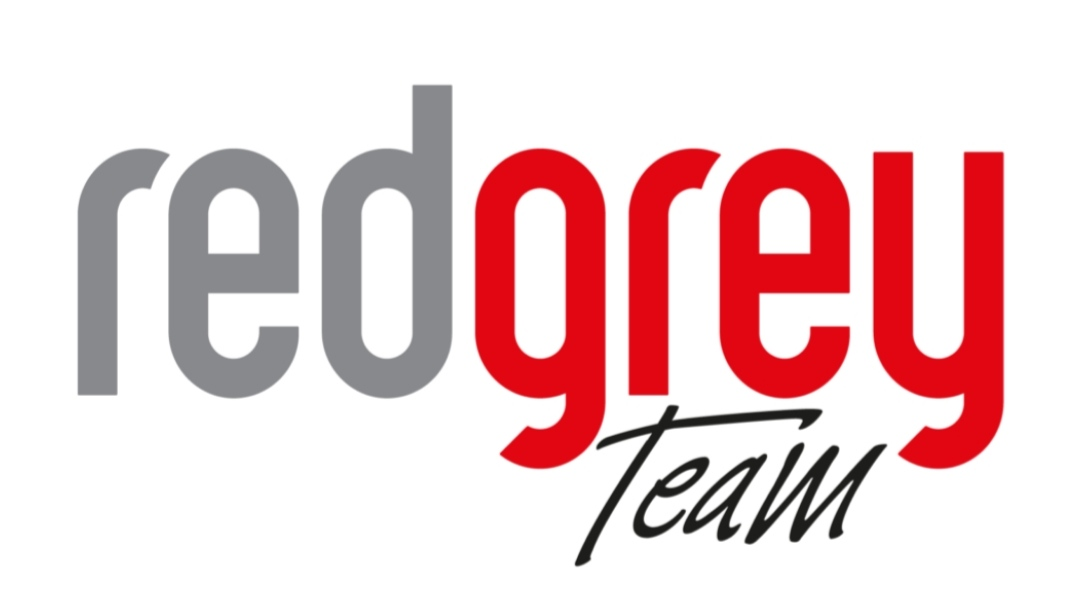
- Industry: Rallying
- Founded: 2005
- Headquarters: Kurna, Estonia
- Key people: Juss Roden, President
- Subsidiaries: LightGrey Team
- Website: redgreyteam.com

RedGrey Team is a rally team based in Kurna, Estonia, established in 2020 by former rally driver Markko Märtin and the 2019 World Rally Champion, Ott Tänak. The team replaced an older team established in December 2005, MM-Motorsport, following Tänak's investment in Märtin's company that formed the team. The team rarely enters motorsport competition itself, principally offering rally cars for rent and associated operational services to customers, such as Hyundai Motorsport.

== History ==
=== MM-Motorsport ===
RedGrey's origins began in 2005 as MM-Motorsport, the competition entry and trading name used by Märtin's company, Triple-M. This team won consecutive Estonian Group N championships between 2006 and 2010. In 2011, Ott Tänak finished second in the Super 2000 World Rally Championship in cooperation with MM-Motorsport.

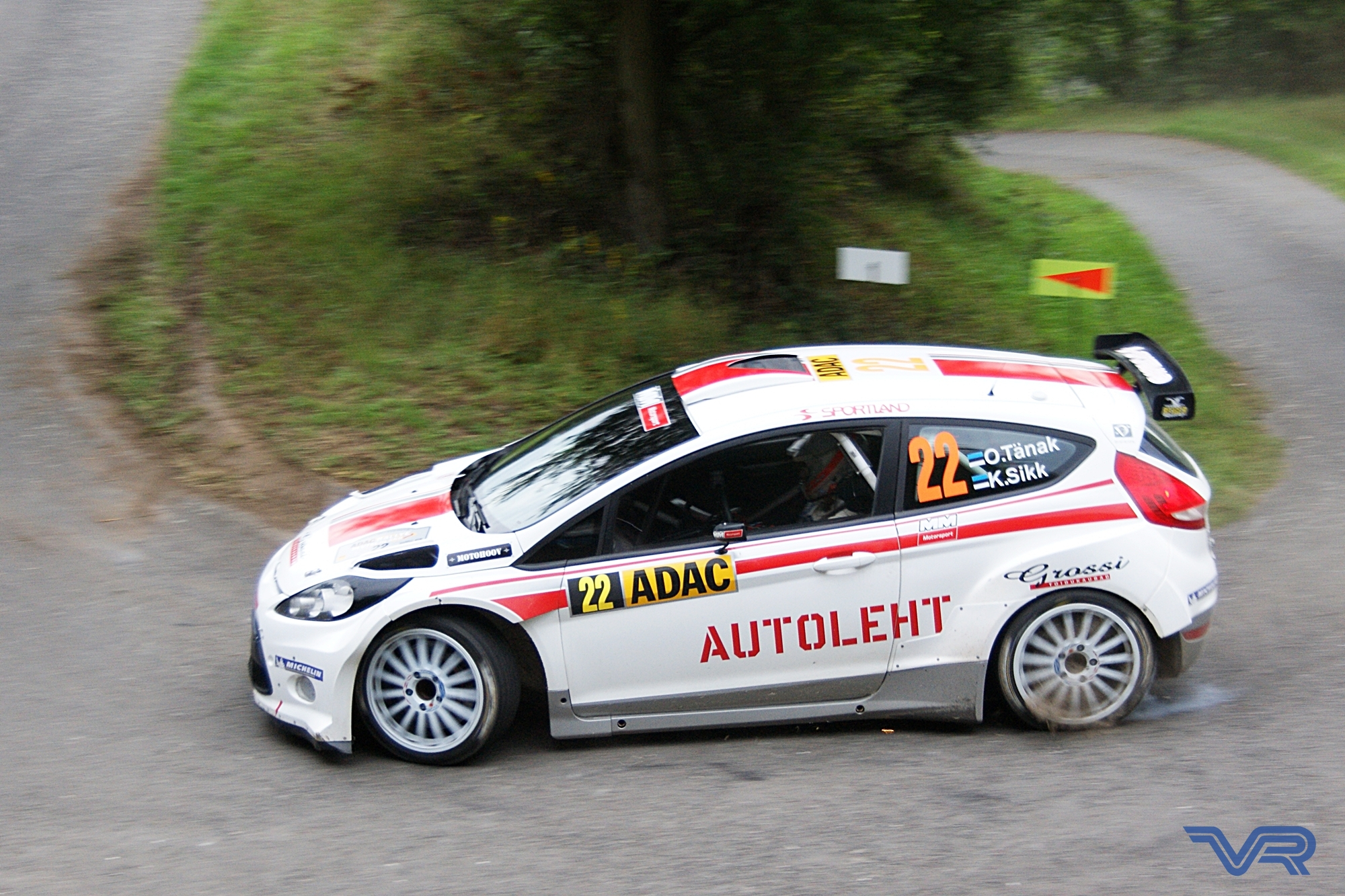
Ott Tänak in 2011 Rallye Deutschland

Between 2015 and 2019, MM-Motorsport operated Ford Fiesta R5 cars entered into the WRC by Tommi Mäkinen Racing and driven by Takamoto Katsuta on behalf of Toyota Gazoo Racing.

MM-Motorsport changed its name to RedGrey Team in 2020. In April 2023, it was announced that Märtin had sold his stake in the business and would no longer work in partnership with Tänak, or in the motorsport industry.

== Activities ==
=== WRC2: Hyundai Motorsport N (2020–2022) ===
In 2020, RedGrey began operating the official Hyundai Motorsport N entry in the WRC2 Championship with Hyundai i20 R5 and later, i20 N Rally2 cars. The contract between Hyundai Motorsport and RedGrey ended after 2022, making the partnership coincide with Tänak's tenure as a Rally1 driver for the Hyundai World Rally Team.

==== 2020 ====
In the 2020 WRC2 season, Nikolay Gryazin and Ole Christian Veiby were entered as drivers for the team. The team finished third of four entries, with Gryazin and Veiby finishing fifth and fourth respectively in the driver's championship and level on points.

==== 2021 ====
In 2021, the i20 N Rally2 car was debuted and several drivers had opportunities to drive with the team. After Rally Portugal, the entire membership of the RedGrey team were ordered to isolate in hotels within the country for two weeks following the discovery of a COVID-19 case within the team. Driver Ole Christian Veiby was banned from global motorsport for six months for breaching these quarantine rules.

The team finished the season fourth of five entries in the WRC2 team's championship.

==== 2022 ====
Teemu Suninen and Fabrizio Zaldivar headed the campaign in the 2022 season. The team finished second, just two points behind champions Toksport.

After winning the teams class at Rally Finland, Suninen was disqualified for having an underweight bumper fitted. RedGrey team were found to have fitted a bumper used for testing which did not comply with the rules.

=== European Rally Championship ===
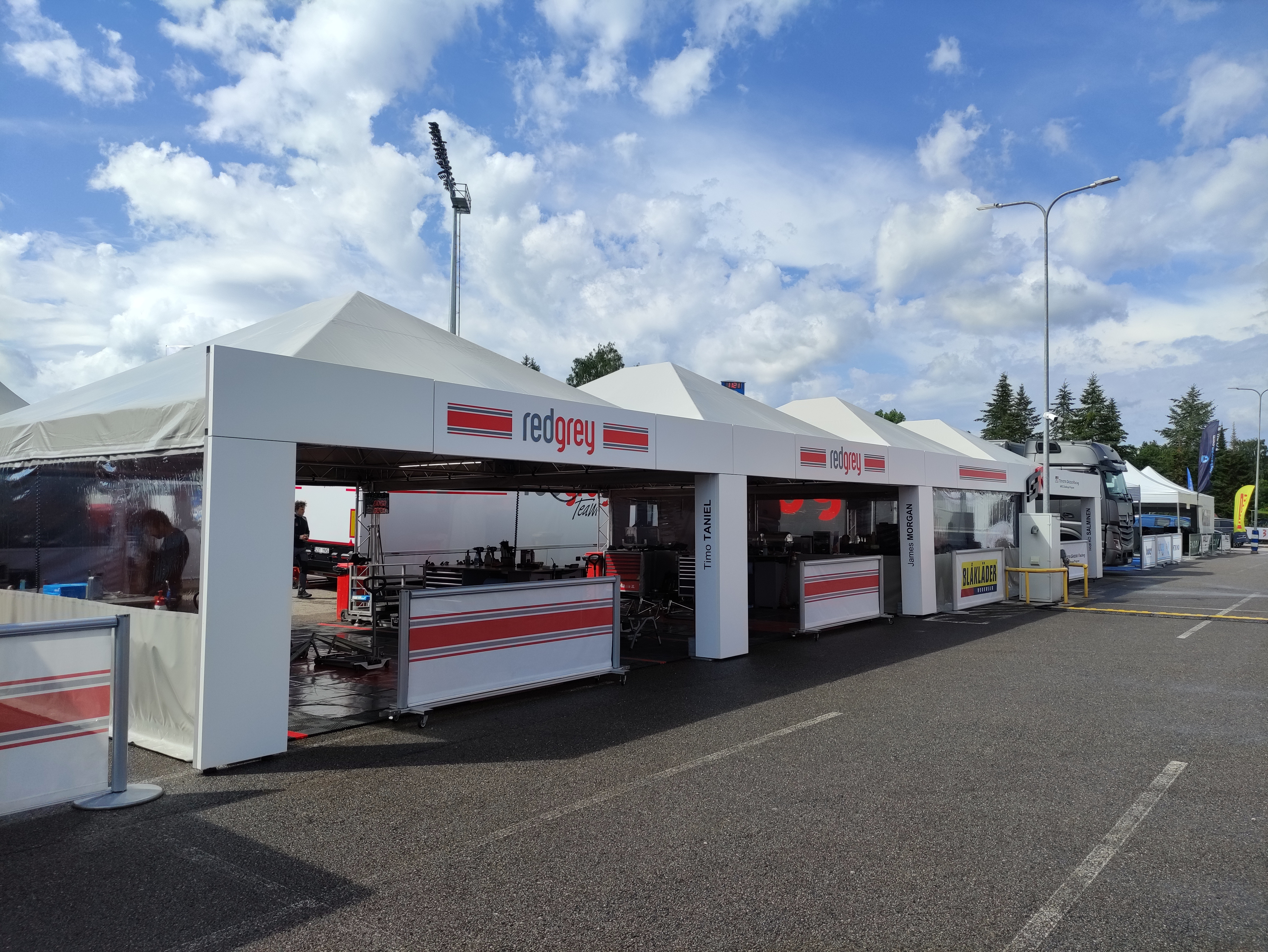
RedGrey Team tent at the 2024 Rally Estonia

==== 2023 ====
RedGrey entered the 2023 ERC season in their own name, they competed in the first round using Ford Fiesta Rally2 and Hyundai i20 N Rally2 cars for Robert Virves and Georg Linnamäe.

== Results ==
=== SWRC Results ===
Year	Entrant	Car	No	Driver	1	2	3	4	5	6	7	8	DC	Points	TC	Points
2011	MM Motorsport	Ford Fiesta S2000	22	(Estonia) Ott Tänak	MEX; 3	JOR	ITA; 1	GRE; Ret	FIN; 3	GER; 1	FRA; 1	ESP; 6	2nd	113	N/A	N/A

=== ERC Results ===
Year	Entrant	Car	No	Driver	1	2	3	4	5	6	7	8	9	10	11	DC	Points	TC	Points
2014	MM Motorsport	Ford Fiesta R5	1	(Estonia) Ott Tänak	JÄN	LIE	GRE	IRE	AZO	YPR	EST; 1	CZE	CYP	VAL	COR	11th	44	N/A	N/A
2014	MM Motorsport	Ford Fiesta R5	19/9	(Estonia) Timmu Kõrge	JÄN	LIE; Ret	GRE	IRE	AZO	YPR	EST; 3	CZE	CYP	VAL	COR	20th	26	N/A	N/A
2023	RedGrey Team	Hyundai i20 N Rally2	24/8	(Estonia) Georg Linnamäe	PRT; 3	CAN	POL	LAT; 8	SWE	ITA	CZE	HUN				14th	35	7th	60
2023	RedGrey Team	Ford Fiesta Rally2	25/14	(Estonia) Robert Virves	PRT; 16	CAN	POL	LAT; 5	SWE	ITA	CZE	HUN				26th	19	7th	60
2024	RedGrey Team	Toyota GR Yaris Rally2	12	(Estonia) Georg Linnamäe	HUN	CAN	SWE	EST; 1	ITA	CZE	GBR	POL				13th	35	6th	63
2024	RedGrey Team	Toyota GR Yaris Rally2	18	(Estonia) Gregor Jeets	HUN	CAN	SWE	EST; 9	ITA	CZE	GBR	POL				37th	10	6th	63
2024	RedGrey Team	Ford Fiesta Rally2	6	(Republic of Ireland) William Creighton	HUN	CAN	SWE	EST	ITA	CZE	GBR; 13	POL				60th	3	6th	63
2024	RedGrey Team	Ford Fiesta Rally2	15	(United Kingdom) Garry Pearson	HUN	CAN	SWE	EST	ITA	CZE	GBR; 13	POL				-	-	6th	63

== See also ==
- LightGrey Team
