= 2024 Rally Estonia =

14th edition of Rally Estonia

2024 Rally Estonia ERC Delfi Rally Estonia 2024
Round 4 of 8 in the 2024 European Rally Championship
← Previous event	Next event →
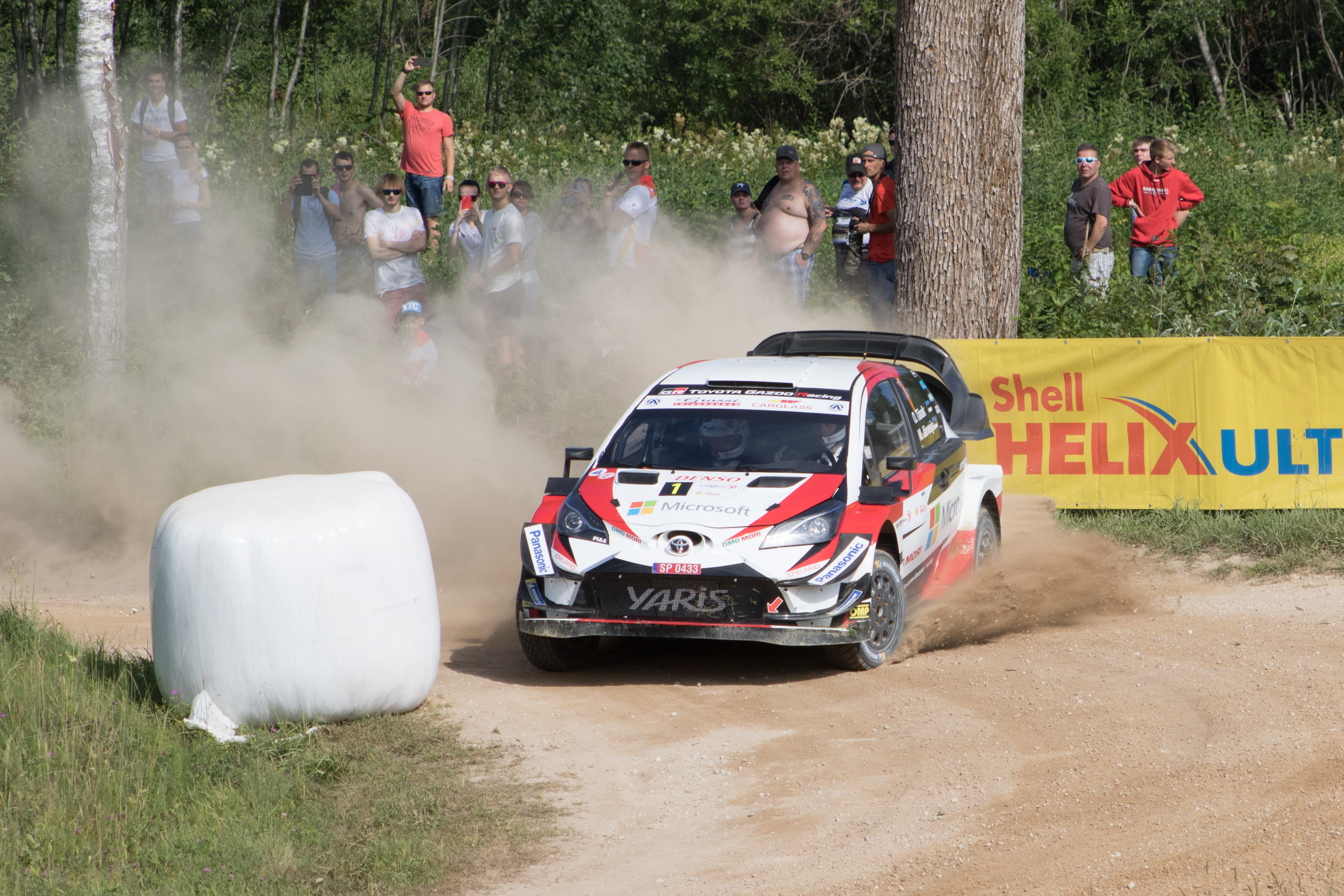
- Ott Tänak also took part of the rally but not in the ERC category.
- Host country: Estonia
- Rally base: Otepää, Valga County
- Dates run: 5 – 7 July 2024
- Start location: Tartu, Tartu County
- Finish location: Tartu, Tartu County
- Stages: 14 (187.79 km; 116.69 miles)
- Stage surface: Gravel
- Transport distance: 569.62 km (353.95 miles)
- Overall distance: 757.41 km (470.63 miles)

Statistics
- Crews registered: 51
- Crews: 51 at start, 42 at finish

Overall results
- Overall winner: (Estonia) Georg Linnamäe (United Kingdom) James Morgan (Estonia) RedGrey Team; 1:44:33.1
- Power Stage winner: (Estonia) Georg Linnamäe (United Kingdom) James Morgan (Estonia) RedGrey Team; 13:19.0

The 2024 Rally Estonia (also known as the ERC Delfi Rally Estonia 2024) was a motor racing event for rally cars held over three days from 5 to 7 July 2024. It marked the fourteenth running of the Rally Estonia, and was the fourth round of the 2024 European Rally Championship. The event was based in Otepää of Valga County, and was contested over fourteen special stages covering a total of competitive distance of 187.79 km (116.69 mi).

Georg Linnamäe and James Morgan won the rally, and their team, RedGrey Team, were the manufacturers' winners. Romet Jürgenson and Siim Oja won the European Rally Championship-3 category. Jaspar Vaher and Sander Pruul won the European Rally Championship-4 category, as well as the junior championship.

== Background ==
=== Entry list ===
The following crews are set to enter into the rally. The event is set to be opened to crews competing in the European Rally Championship, its support categories, the European Rally Championship-3, European Rally Championship-4 and European Rally Championship Junior entries. Twenty-one are set to enter under Rally2 regulations, as are eight Rally3 crews in the European Rally Championship-3 and fifteen Rally4 crew in the European Rally Championship-4. A total of thirteen crews are set to be participated in the ERC Junior Championship.

Rally2 and R5 entries competing in the European Rally Championship
No.	Driver	Co-Driver	Entrant	Car	Championship eligibility	Tyre
1	(New Zealand) Hayden Paddon	(New Zealand) John Kennard	(Italy) BRC Racing Team	Hyundai i20 N Rally2	Driver, Co-driver, Team	P
2	(France) Mathieu Franceschi	(France) Andy Malfoy	(France) Mathieu Franceschi	Škoda Fabia RS Rally2	Driver, Co-driver	MI
3	(Romania) Simone Tempestini	(Romania) Sergiu Itu	(Romania) Simone Tempestini	Škoda Fabia RS Rally2	Driver, Co-driver	MI
4	(Norway) Mads Østberg	(Sweden) Patrik Barth	(Hungary) TRT Rally Team	Citroën C3 Rally2	Driver, Co-driver, Team	MI
5	(Finland) Mikko Heikkilä	(Finland) Kristian Temonen	(Finland) Mikko Heikkilä	Toyota GR Yaris Rally2	Driver, Co-driver	MI
6	(Poland) Mikołaj Marczyk	(Poland) Szymon Gospodarczyk	(Poland) Mikołaj Marczyk	Škoda Fabia RS Rally2	Driver, Co-driver	MI
7	(Republic of Ireland) Jon Armstrong	(Republic of Ireland) Eoin Tracy	(Republic of Ireland) Jon Armstrong	Ford Fiesta Rally2	Driver, Co-driver	P
8	(Italy) Andrea Mabellini	(Italy) Virginia Lenzi	(India) Team MRF Tyres	Škoda Fabia RS Rally2	Driver, Co-driver, Team	MR
9	(Norway) Frank Tore Larsen	(Norway) Torstein Eriksen	(Norway) Frank Tore Larsen	Volkswagen Polo GTI R5	Driver, Co-driver	P
10	(Latvia) Mārtiņš Sesks	(Latvia) Renārs Francis	(India) Team MRF Tyres	Toyota GR Yaris Rally2	Driver, Co-driver, Team	MR
11	(Italy) Giacomo Costenaro	(Italy) Pietro Elia Ometto	(Italy) Giacomo Costenaro	Škoda Fabia Rally2 evo	Driver, Co-driver	P
12	(Estonia) Georg Linnamäe	(United Kingdom) James Morgan	(Estonia) RedGrey Team	Toyota GR Yaris Rally2	Driver, Co-driver, Team	MI
14	(Bulgaria) Nikolay Gryazin	(Latvia) Andris Mālnieks	(Bulgaria) Nikolay Gryazin	Citroën C3 Rally2	Driver, Co-driver	P
15	(Estonia) Robert Virves	(United Kingdom) Craig Drew	(Estonia) Robert Virves	Škoda Fabia RS Rally2	Driver, Co-driver	P
16	(Finland) Teemu Asunmaa	(Finland) Ville Mannisenmäki	(Finland) Teemu Asunmaa	Škoda Fabia RS Rally2	Driver, Co-driver	P
17	(Finland) Benjamin Korhola	(Finland) Sebastian Virtanen	(Finland) Benjamin Korhola	Hyundai i20 N Rally2	Driver, Co-driver	P
18	(Estonia) Gregor Jeets	(Estonia) Timo Taniel	(Estonia) RedGrey Team	Toyota GR Yaris Rally2	Driver, Co-driver, Team	MI
19	(Estonia) Kaspar Kasari	(Estonia) Rainis Raidma	(Estonia) OT Racing	Ford Fiesta Rally2	Driver, Co-driver, Team	P
20	(Japan) Yuki Yamamoto	(Finland) Marko Salminen	(Japan) Toyota Gazoo Racing WRT NG	Toyota GR Yaris Rally2	Driver, Co-driver, Team	P
21	(United Kingdom) Philip Allen	(United Kingdom) Dale Furniss	(United Kingdom) Philip Allen	Škoda Fabia RS Rally2	Driver, Co-driver	P
46	(Israel) Sergey Uger	(Israel) Maria Uger Obolenskaya	(Israel) Cone Forest Motorsport	Ford Fiesta R5	Driver, Co-driver, Team	MI

Rally3 entries competing in the European Rally Championship-3
No.	Driver	Co-Driver	Entrant	Car	Championship eligibility	Tyre
22	(Poland) Igor Widłak	(Poland) Michał Marczewski	(Poland) Grupa PGS RT	Ford Fiesta Rally3	Driver, Co-driver, Team, Fiesta Rally3 Trophy	P
23	(Turkey) Kerem Kazaz	(Portugal) Hugo Magalhães	(Turkey) Atölye Kazaz	Ford Fiesta Rally3	Driver, Co-driver, Team, Fiesta Rally3 Trophy	P
24	(Czech Republic) Filip Kohn	(United Kingdom) Tom Woodburn	(Czech Republic) Filip Kohn	Ford Fiesta Rally3	Driver, Co-driver, Fiesta Rally3 Trophy	P
25	(Croatia) Martin Ravenščak	(Croatia) Dora Ravenščak	(Croatia) Martin Ravenščak	Ford Fiesta Rally3	Driver, Co-driver, Fiesta Rally3 Trophy	P
26	(France) Tristan Charpentier	(France) Alexis Maillefert	(France) Tristan Charpentier	Ford Fiesta Rally3	Driver, Co-driver, Fiesta Rally3 Trophy	P
27	(Estonia) Romet Jürgenson	(Estonia) Siim Oja	Team Estonia Autosport	Ford Fiesta Rally3	Driver, Co-driver, Team	P
28	(Estonia) Joosep Ralf Nõgene	(Estonia) Aleks Lesk	(Estonia) LightGrey Team	Renault Clio Rally3	Driver, Co-driver, Team	P
29	(Estonia) Patrick Enok	(Estonia) Silver Simm	(Estonia) LightGrey Team	Ford Fiesta Rally3	Driver, Co-driver, Team	P

Rally4 entries competing in the European Rally Championship-4
No.	Driver	Co-Driver	Entrant	Car	Championship eligibility	Tyre
30	(Sweden) Mille Johansson	(Sweden) Johan Grönvall	(Slovenia) IK Sport Racing	Opel Corsa Rally4	Driver, Co-driver, Team, Junior ERC	HK
31	(United Kingdom) Max McRae	(United Kingdom) Cameron Fair	(Hungary) TRT Rally Team	Peugeot 208 Rally4	Driver, Co-driver, Team, Junior ERC	HK
32	(Sweden) Calle Carlberg	(Norway) Jørgen Eriksen	(Germany) ADAC Opel Rallye Junior Team	Opel Corsa Rally4	Driver, Co-driver, Team, Junior ERC	HK
33	(Czech Republic) Daniel Polášek	(Czech Republic) Zdeněk Omelka	(Czech Republic) Daniel Polášek	Peugeot 208 Rally4	Driver, Co-driver, Junior ERC	HK
34	(Republic of Ireland) Aoife Raftery	(Republic of Ireland) Hannah McKillop	(Republic of Ireland) Motorsport Ireland Rally Academy	Peugeot 208 Rally4	Driver, Co-driver, Team, Junior ERC	HK
35	(Germany) Timo Schulz	(Germany) Michael Wenzel	(Germany) ADAC Opel Rallye Junior Team	Opel Corsa Rally4	Driver, Co-driver, Team, Junior ERC	HK
36	(Estonia) Karl-Markus Sei	(Estonia) Martin Leotoots	(Estonia) ALM Motorsport	Peugeot 208 Rally4	Driver, Co-driver, Team, Junior ERC	HK
37	(Hungary) Patrik Herczig	(Hungary) Kristóf Varga	(Hungary) HRT Racing Kft.	Peugeot 208 Rally4	Driver, Co-driver, Team, Junior ERC	HK
38	(Estonia) Jaspar Vaher	(Estonia) Sander Pruul	M-Sport Poland	Ford Fiesta Rally4	Driver, Co-driver, Team, Junior ERC	HK
39	(Italy) Davide Pesavento	(Italy) Flavio Zanella	(Italy) Davide Pesavento	Peugeot 208 Rally4	Driver, Co-driver, Junior ERC	HK
40	(Italy) Mattia Zanin	(Italy) Elia De Guio	(Italy) Mattia Zanin	Peugeot 208 Rally4	Driver, Co-driver, Junior ERC	HK
41	(Finland) Tuomas Välilä	(Finland) Päivi Välilä	(Finland) Tuomas Välilä	Ford Fiesta Rally4	Driver, Co-driver, Junior ERC	HK
43	(Sweden) Adam Grahn	(Sweden) Marcus Sundh	(Sweden) Adam Grahn	Ford Fiesta Rally4	Driver, Co-driver, Junior ERC	HK
44	(Hungary) Márton Bertalan	(Hungary) Róbert Paizs	(Hungary) HRT Racing Kft.	Peugeot 208 Rally4	Driver, Co-driver, Team	P
45	(Romania) Cristiana Oprea	(Romania) Denisa-Alexia Parteni	(Romania) Cristiana Oprea	Opel Corsa Rally4	Driver, Co-driver	P

Other major entries
No.	Driver	Co-Driver	Entrant	Car	Tyre
100	(Estonia) Ott Tänak	(Estonia) Martin Järveoja	(South Korea) Hyundai Shell Mobis WRT	Hyundai i20 N Rally1	P

=== Itinerary ===
All dates and times are EEST (UTC+3).

Date	No.	Time span	Stage name	Distance
5 July	—	After 9:31	Räbi [Shakedown]	3.89 km
5 July		After 18:30	Opening ceremony, Tartu	—N/a
5 July	SS1	After 19:35	Tartu vald 1	1.49 km
6 July	SS2	After 7:49	Raanitsa 1	21.45 km
6 July	SS3	After 8:47	Karaski 1	11.97 km
6 July		9:47 – 10:07	Regroup, Tehvandi	—N/a
6 July		10:07 – 10:37	Service A, Tehvandi	—N/a
6 July	SS4	After 11:05	Raanitsa 2	21.45 km
6 July	SS5	After 12:03	Karaski 2	11.97 km
6 July		12:33 – 13:10	Regroup, Tehvandi	—N/a
6 July		13:10 – 13:40	Service B, Tehvandi	—N/a
6 July	SS6	After 14:23	Kanepi 1	10.04 km
6 July	SS7	After 15:46	Mäeküla 1	14.68 km
6 July		16:01 – 16:21	Regroup, Tehvandi	—N/a
6 July		16:21 – 16:51	Service C, Tehvandi	—N/a
6 July	SS8	After 17:34	Kanepi 2	10.04 km
6 July	SS9	After 18:57	Mäeküla 2	14.68 km
6 July	SS10	After 20:20	Elva linn	1.62 km
7 July		8:28 – 9:13	Service D, Tehvandi	—N/a
7 July	SS11	After 9:34	Otepää 1	12.85 km
7 July	SS12	After 10:35	Kambja 1	21.35 km
7 July		11:10 – 12:05	Regroup, Tehvandi	—N/a
7 July		12:05 – 12:35	Service E, Tehvandi	—N/a
7 July	SS13	After 12:56	Otepää 2	12.85 km
7 July	SS14	After 15:05	Kambja 2 [Power Stage]	21.35 km
7 July		After 17:30	Podium ceremony, Tartu	—N/a
7 July		After 18:00	Finish	—N/a

== Report ==
=== ERC Rally2 ===
==== Classification ====
Position		No.	Driver	Co-driver	Entrant	Car	Time	Difference	Points	
Event	Class	No.	Driver	Co-driver	Entrant	Car	Time	Difference	Event	Stage
1	1	12	Georg Linnamäe	James Morgan	RedGrey Team	Toyota GR Yaris Rally2	1:44:33.1	0.0	30	5
2	2	15	Robert Virves	Craig Drew	Robert Virves	Škoda Fabia RS Rally2	1:44:35.3	+2.2	24	4
3	3	14	Nikolay Gryazin	Andris Mālnieks	SC - 911 Team	Citroën C3 Rally2	1:45:44.3	+1:11.2	21	0
4	4	4	Mads Østberg	Patrik Barth	TRT Rally Team	Citroën C3 Rally2	1:45:56.3	+1:23.2	19	3
5	5	1	Hayden Paddon	John Kennard	BRC Racing Team	Hyundai i20 N Rally2	1:46:32.3	+1:59.2	17	0
6	6	7	Jon Armstrong	Eoin Treacy	Jon Armstrong	Ford Fiesta Rally2	1:46:53.2	+2:20.1	15	2
7	7	6	Mikołaj Marczyk	Szymon Gospodarczyk	Mikołaj Marczyk	Škoda Fabia RS Rally2	1:46:55.3	+2:22.2	13	0
8	8	8	Andrea Mabellini	Virginia Lenzi	Team MRF Tyres	Škoda Fabia RS Rally2	1:47:21.3	+2:48.2	11	0
9	9	18	Gregor Jeets	Timo Taniel	RedGrey Team	Toyota GR Yaris Rally2	1:47:26.9	+2:53.8	9	1
10	10	2	Mathieu Franceschi	Andy Malfoy	Mathieu Franceschi	Škoda Fabia RS Rally2	1:47:34.0	+3:00.9	7	0
11	11	16	Teemu Asunmaa	Ville Mannisenmäki	Teemu Asunmaa	Škoda Fabia RS Rally2	1:47:44.9	+3:11.8	5	0
12	12	20	Yuki Yamamoto	Marko Salminen	Toyota Gazoo Racing WRT NG	Toyota GR Yaris Rally2	1:49:03.3	+4:30.2	4	0
13	13	9	Frank Tore Larsen	Torstein Eriksen	Frank Tore Larsen	Volkswagen Polo GTI R5	1:49:14.4	+4:41.3	3	0
14	14	10	Mārtiņš Sesks	Renārs Francis	Team MRF Tyres	Toyota GR Yaris Rally2	1:49:19.4	+4:46.3	2	0
15	15	19	Kaspar Kasari	Rainis Raidma	OT Racing	Ford Fiesta Rally2	1:50:15.3	+5:42.2	1	0
Retired SS13		5	Mikko Heikkilä	Kristian Temonen	Mikko Heikkilä	Toyota GR Yaris Rally2	Mechanical		0	0
Retired SS5		17	Benjamin Korhola	Sebastian Virtanen	Benjamin Korhola	Hyundai i20 N Rally2	Mechanical		0	0
Retired SS3		46	Sergey Uger	Maria Obolenskaya Uger	Cone Forest Motorsport	Ford Fiesta R5	Mechanical		0	0
Retired SS2		3	Simone Tempestini	Sergiu Itu	Simone Tempestini	Škoda Fabia RS Rally2	Accident		0	0

==== Special stages ====
Stage	Winners	Car	Time	Class leaders
SD	Virves / Drew	Škoda Fabia RS Rally2	1:55.77	—N/a
SS1	Paddon / Kennard	Hyundai i20 N Rally2	1:31.1	Paddon / Kennard
SS2	Linnamäe / Morgan	Toyota GR Yaris Rally2	10:48.6	Linnamäe / Morgan
SS3	Paddon / Kennard	Hyundai i20 N Rally2	6:24.2	Linnamäe / Morgan
SS4	Virves / Drew	Škoda Fabia RS Rally2	10:46.3	Linnamäe / Morgan
SS5	Virves / Drew	Škoda Fabia RS Rally2	6:14.9	Virves / Drew
SS6	Heikkilä / Temonen	Toyota GR Yaris Rally2	5:19.7	Linnamäe / Morgan
SS7	Linnamäe / Morgan	Toyota GR Yaris Rally2	7:56.9	Linnamäe / Morgan
SS8	Linnamäe / Morgan	Toyota GR Yaris Rally2	5:14.6	Linnamäe / Morgan
SS9	Virves / Drew	Škoda Fabia RS Rally2	7:49.7	Virves / Drew
SS10	Gryazin / Mālnieks	Citroën C3 Rally2	1:20.2	Virves / Drew
SS11	Virves / Drew	Škoda Fabia RS Rally2	7:30.3	Virves / Drew
SS12	Linnamäe / Morgan	Toyota GR Yaris Rally2	12:29.2	Virves / Drew
SS13	Virves / Drew	Škoda Fabia RS Rally2	7:22.5	Virves / Drew
SS14	Linnamäe / Morgan	Toyota GR Yaris Rally2	13:19.0	Linnamäe / Morgan

==== Championship standings ====
Pos.	Drivers' championships			Co-drivers' championships		
Pos.	Move	Driver	Points	Move	Co-driver	Points
1	1	Hayden Paddon	73	1	John Kennard	73
2	1	Mathieu Franceschi	63	1	Andy Malfoy	63
3	New entry	Mads Østberg	53	New entry	Patrik Barth	53
4	New entry	Jon Armstrong	42	New entry	Eoin Tracy	42
5	2	Simone Tempestini	40	2	Sergiu Itu	40

=== ERC-3 Rally3 ===
==== Classification ====
Position		No.	Driver	Co-driver	Entrant	Car	Time	Difference	Points
Event	Class	No.	Driver	Co-driver	Entrant	Car	Time	Difference	Event
16	1	27	Romet Jürgenson	Siim Oja	Team Estonia Autosport	Ford Fiesta Rally3	1:50:44.8	0.0	30
17	2	29	Patrick Enok	Silver Simm	LightGrey Team	Ford Fiesta Rally3	1:51:02.4	+17.6	24
18	3	28	Joosep Ralf Nõgene	Aleks Lesk	LightGrey Team	Renault Clio Rally3	1:51:31.8	+47.0	21
19	4	23	Kerem Kazaz	Hugo Magalhães	Atölye Kazaz	Ford Fiesta Rally3	1:55:43.1	+4:58.3	19
20	5	24	Filip Kohn	Tom Woodburn	Filip Kohn	Ford Fiesta Rally3	1:56:13.3	+5:28.5	17
25	6	22	Igor Widłak	Daniel Dymurski	Grupa PGS RT	Ford Fiesta Rally3	1:57:47.7	+7:02.9	15
28	7	25	Martin Ravenščak	Dora Ravenščak	Martin Ravenščak	Ford Fiesta Rally3	1:59:38.1	+8:53.3	13
Retired SS12		25	Tristan Charpentier	Alexis Maillefert	Tristan Charpentier	Ford Fiesta Rally3	Mechanical		0

==== Special stages ====
Stage	Winners	Car	Time	Class leaders
SD	Nõgene / Lesk	Renault Clio Rally3	2:09.0	—N/a
SS1	Charpentier / Maillefert	Ford Fiesta Rally3	1:35.3	Charpentier / Maillefert
SS2	Enok / Simm	Ford Fiesta Rally3	11:30.9	Jürgenson / Oja
SS3	Jürgenson / Oja	Ford Fiesta Rally3	6:43.7	Jürgenson / Oja
SS4	Enok / Simm	Ford Fiesta Rally3	11:24.1	Enok / Simm
SS5	Jürgenson / Oja	Ford Fiesta Rally3	6:39.2	Jürgenson / Oja
SS6	Jürgenson / Oja	Ford Fiesta Rally3	5:35.7	Jürgenson / Oja
SS7	Enok / Simm	Ford Fiesta Rally3	8:21.4	Jürgenson / Oja
SS8	Nõgene / Lesk	Renault Clio Rally3	5:32.7	Jürgenson / Oja
SS9	Enok / Simm	Ford Fiesta Rally3	8:23.1	Jürgenson / Oja
SS10	Enok / Simm	Ford Fiesta Rally3	1:24.5	Jürgenson / Oja
SS11	Nõgene / Lesk	Renault Clio Rally3	7:58.5	Jürgenson / Oja
SS12	Enok / Simm	Ford Fiesta Rally3	13:13.5	Jürgenson / Oja
SS13	Jürgenson / Oja	Ford Fiesta Rally3	7:54.3	Jürgenson / Oja
SS14	Enok / Simm	Ford Fiesta Rally3	14:13.3	Jürgenson / Oja

==== Championship standings ====
Pos.	Drivers' championships			Co-drivers' championships		
Pos.	Move	Driver	Points	Move	Co-driver	Points
1		Igor Widłak	88		Tom Woodburn	77
2		Kerem Kazaz	83	2	Dora Ravenščak	51
3		Filip Kohn	77	1	Daniel Dymurski	49
4		Martin Ravenščak	51	New entry	Hugo Magalhães	43
5	New entry	Romet Jürgenson	30	2	Andris Mālnieks	40

=== ERC-4 Rally4 ===
==== Classification ====
Position		No.	Driver	Co-driver	Entrant	Car	Time	Difference	Points
Event	Class	No.	Driver	Co-driver	Entrant	Car	Time	Difference	Event
21	1	38	Jaspar Vaher	Sander Pruul	M-Sport Poland	Ford Fiesta Rally4	1:56:40.2	0.0	30
22	2	32	Calle Carlberg	Jørgen Eriksen	ADAC Opel Rallye Junior Team	Opel Corsa Rally4	1:57:26.5	+46.3	24
23	3	30	Mille Johansson	Johan Grönvall	IK Sport Racing	Opel Corsa Rally4	1:57:32.8	+52.6	21
24	4	36	Karl-Markus Sei	Martin Leotoots	ALM Motorsport	Peugeot 208 Rally4	1:57:34.2	+54.0	19
29	5	35	Timo Schulz	Michael Wenzel	ADAC Opel Rallye Junior Team	Opel Corsa Rally4	1:59:43.3	+3:03.1	17
30	6	37	Patrik Herczig	Kristóf Varga	HRT Racing Kft.	Peugeot 208 Rally4	1:59:59.1	+3:18.9	15
33	7	41	Tuomas Välilä	Päivi Välilä	Tuomas Välilä	Ford Fiesta Rally4	2:04:47.9	+8:07.7	13
35	8	33	Daniel Polášek	Zdeněk Omelka	Daniel Polášek	Peugeot 208 Rally4	2:06:17.3	+9:37.1	11
37	9	34	Aoife Raftery	Hannah McKillop	Motorsport Ireland Rally Academy	Peugeot 208 Rally4	2:07:40.7	+11:00.5	9
38	10	39	Davide Pesavento	Flavio Zanella	Davide Pesavento	Peugeot 208 Rally4	2:19:41.1	+23:00.9	7
39	11	43	Adam Grahn	Marcus Sundh	Adam Grahn	Ford Fiesta Rally4	2:25:40.0	+28:59.8	5
41	12	31	Max McRae	Cameron Fair	TRT Rally Team	Peugeot 208 Rally4	2:58:27.7	+1:01:47.7	4
Retired SS12		45	Cristiana Oprea	Denisa-Alexia Parteni	Cristiana Oprea	Opel Corsa Rally4	Accident		0
Retired SS11		40	Mattia Zanin	Elia De Guio	Mattia Zanin	Peugeot 208 Rally4	Accident		0
Retired SS9		44	Márton Bertalan	Róbert Paizs	HRT Racing Kft.	Peugeot 208 Rally4	Accident		0

==== Special stages ====
Stage	Winners	Car	Time	Class leaders
SD	Schulz / Wenzel	Opel Corsa Rally4	2:15.9	—N/a
SS1	Schulz / Wenzel	Opel Corsa Rally4	1:41.3	Schulz / Wenzel
SS2	Vaher / Pruul	Ford Fiesta Rally4	12:04.0	Vaher / Pruul
SS3	Vaher / Pruul	Ford Fiesta Rally4	7:08.3	Vaher / Pruul
SS4	Vaher / Pruul	Ford Fiesta Rally4	11:56.3	Vaher / Pruul
SS5	Johansson / Grönvall	Opel Corsa Rally4	7:12.8	Vaher / Pruul
SS6	Vaher / Pruul	Ford Fiesta Rally4	5:56.8	Vaher / Pruul
SS7	Vaher / Pruul	Ford Fiesta Rally4	8:48.7	Vaher / Pruul
SS8	Carlberg / Eriksen	Opel Corsa Rally4	5:50.8	Vaher / Pruul
SS9	Vaher / Pruul	Ford Fiesta Rally4	8:54.7	Vaher / Pruul
SS10	Vaher / Pruul	Ford Fiesta Rally4	1:28.3	Vaher / Pruul
SS11	Carlberg / Eriksen	Opel Corsa Rally4	8:18.9	Vaher / Pruul
SS12	Johansson / Grönvall	Opel Corsa Rally4	13:54.2	Vaher / Pruul
SS13	Vaher / Pruul	Ford Fiesta Rally4	8:17.8	Vaher / Pruul
SS14	Vaher / Pruul	Ford Fiesta Rally4	14:49.8	Vaher / Pruul

==== Championship standings ====
Pos.	Drivers' championships			Co-drivers' championships		
Pos.	Move	Driver	Points	Move	Co-driver	Points
1		Mille Johansson	100		Johan Grönvall	100
2	1	Calle Carlberg	72	1	Jørgen Eriksen	72
3	1	Max McRae	62	1	Cameron Fair	62
4	New entry	Timo Schulz	55	New entry	Michael Wenzel	55
5	1	Daniel Polášek	54	1	Zdeněk Omelka	54

=== Junior ERC Rally4 ===
==== Classification ====
Position		No.	Driver	Co-driver	Entrant	Car	Time	Difference	Points
Event	Class	No.	Driver	Co-driver	Entrant	Car	Time	Difference	Event
21	1	38	Jaspar Vaher	Sander Pruul	M-Sport Poland	Ford Fiesta Rally4	1:56:40.2	0.0	30
22	2	32	Calle Carlberg	Jørgen Eriksen	ADAC Opel Rallye Junior Team	Opel Corsa Rally4	1:57:26.5	+46.3	24
23	3	30	Mille Johansson	Johan Grönvall	IK Sport Racing	Opel Corsa Rally4	1:57:32.8	+52.6	21
24	4	36	Karl-Markus Sei	Martin Leotoots	ALM Motorsport	Peugeot 208 Rally4	1:57:34.2	+54.0	19
29	5	35	Timo Schulz	Michael Wenzel	ADAC Opel Rallye Junior Team	Opel Corsa Rally4	1:59:43.3	+3:03.1	17
30	6	37	Patrik Herczig	Kristóf Varga	HRT Racing Kft.	Peugeot 208 Rally4	1:59:59.1	+3:18.9	15
35	7	33	Daniel Polášek	Zdeněk Omelka	Daniel Polášek	Peugeot 208 Rally4	2:06:17.3	+9:37.1	13
37	8	34	Aoife Raftery	Hannah McKillop	Motorsport Ireland Rally Academy	Peugeot 208 Rally4	2:07:40.7	+11:00.5	11
38	9	39	Davide Pesavento	Flavio Zanella	Davide Pesavento	Peugeot 208 Rally4	2:19:41.1	+23:00.9	9
39	10	43	Adam Grahn	Marcus Sundh	Adam Grahn	Ford Fiesta Rally4	2:25:40.0	+28:59.8	7
41	11	31	Max McRae	Cameron Fair	TRT Rally Team	Peugeot 208 Rally4	2:58:27.7	+1:01:47.7	5
Retired SS11		40	Mattia Zanin	Elia De Guio	Mattia Zanin	Peugeot 208 Rally4	Accident		0

==== Special stages ====
Stage	Winners	Car	Time	Class leaders
SD	Schulz / Wenzel	Opel Corsa Rally4	2:15.9	—N/a
SS1	Schulz / Wenzel	Opel Corsa Rally4	1:41.3	Schulz / Wenzel
SS2	Vaher / Pruul	Ford Fiesta Rally4	12:04.0	Vaher / Pruul
SS3	Vaher / Pruul	Ford Fiesta Rally4	7:08.3	Vaher / Pruul
SS4	Vaher / Pruul	Ford Fiesta Rally4	11:56.3	Vaher / Pruul
SS5	Johansson / Grönvall	Opel Corsa Rally4	7:12.8	Vaher / Pruul
SS6	Vaher / Pruul	Ford Fiesta Rally4	5:56.8	Vaher / Pruul
SS7	Vaher / Pruul	Ford Fiesta Rally4	8:48.7	Vaher / Pruul
SS8	Carlberg / Eriksen	Opel Corsa Rally4	5:50.8	Vaher / Pruul
SS9	Vaher / Pruul	Ford Fiesta Rally4	8:54.7	Vaher / Pruul
SS10	Vaher / Pruul	Ford Fiesta Rally4	1:28.3	Vaher / Pruul
SS11	Carlberg / Eriksen	Opel Corsa Rally4	8:18.9	Vaher / Pruul
SS12	Johansson / Grönvall	Opel Corsa Rally4	13:54.2	Vaher / Pruul
SS13	Vaher / Pruul	Ford Fiesta Rally4	8:17.8	Vaher / Pruul
SS14	Vaher / Pruul	Ford Fiesta Rally4	14:49.8	Vaher / Pruul

==== Championship standings ====
Pos.	Drivers' championships		
Pos.	Move	Driver	Points
1		Mille Johansson	102
2	1	Calle Carlberg	72
3	1	Max McRae	63
4		Daniel Polášek	56
5	New entry	Timo Schulz	55
