= LightGrey Team =

Estonian rallying team

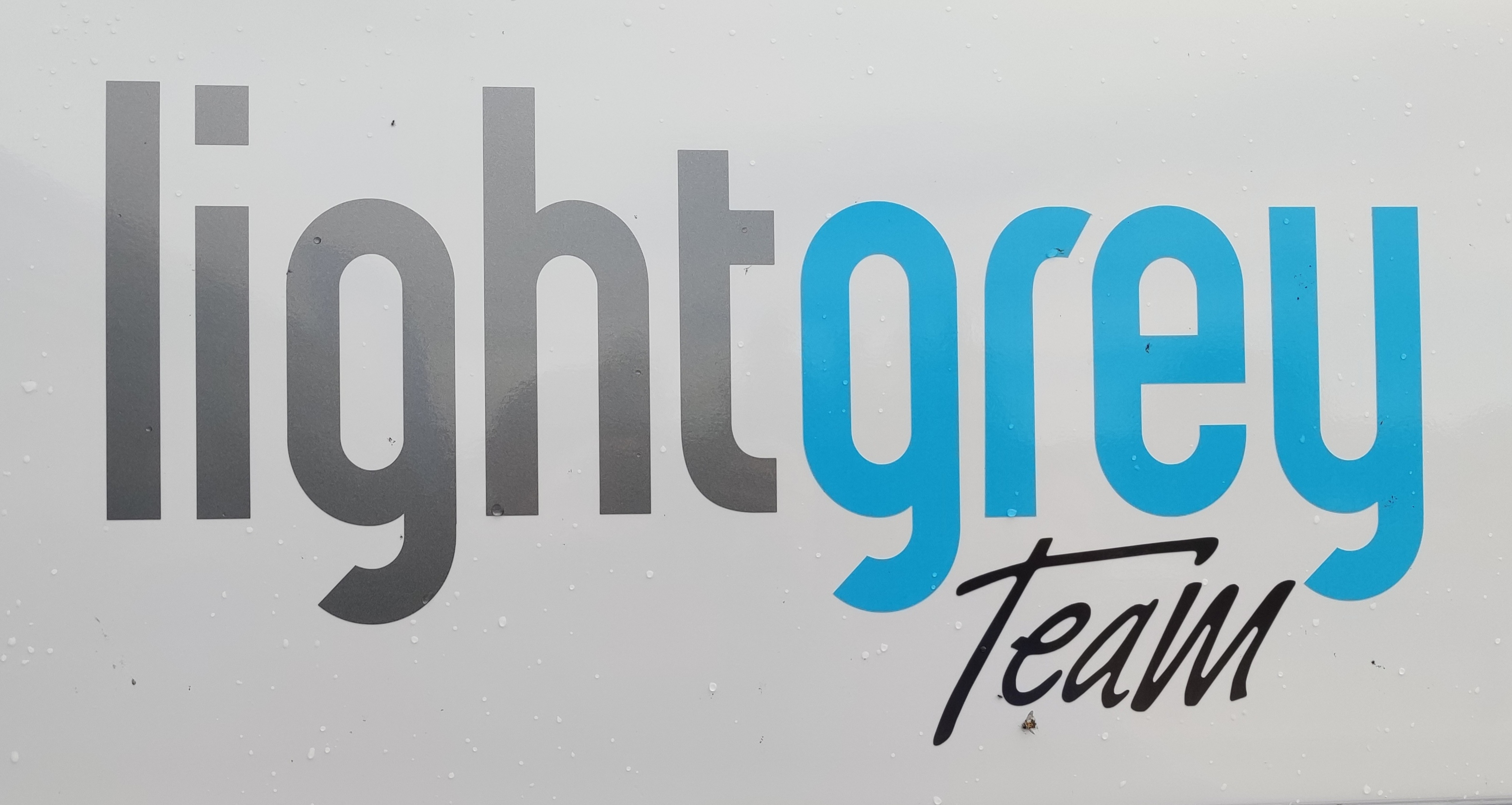
- Industry: Rallying
- Founded: 2024
- Headquarters: Kurna, Estonia
- Parent: RedGrey Team
- Website: lightgrey.ee

LightGrey Team is an Estonian rally team established in 2024. The team is the junior team of RedGrey Team.

== Competition history ==
Established in 2024, LightGrey Team is the junior team of the RedGrey Team, rebranding from CKR Estonia rally team. The team offers Renault Clio Rally3 to rent.

LightGrey Racing Team made their debut at 2024 Rally Estonia with Joosep Ralf Nõgene and Patrick Enok driving the Renault Rally3 cars. They finished the rally in third and second place in the ERC3 category behind Romet Jürgenson.

The team scored their first win in WRC3 at 2024 Rally Latvia when Joosep Ralf Nõgene was driving the Clio Rally3 car.
