= Toyota Vitz =

Japanese motor vehicle

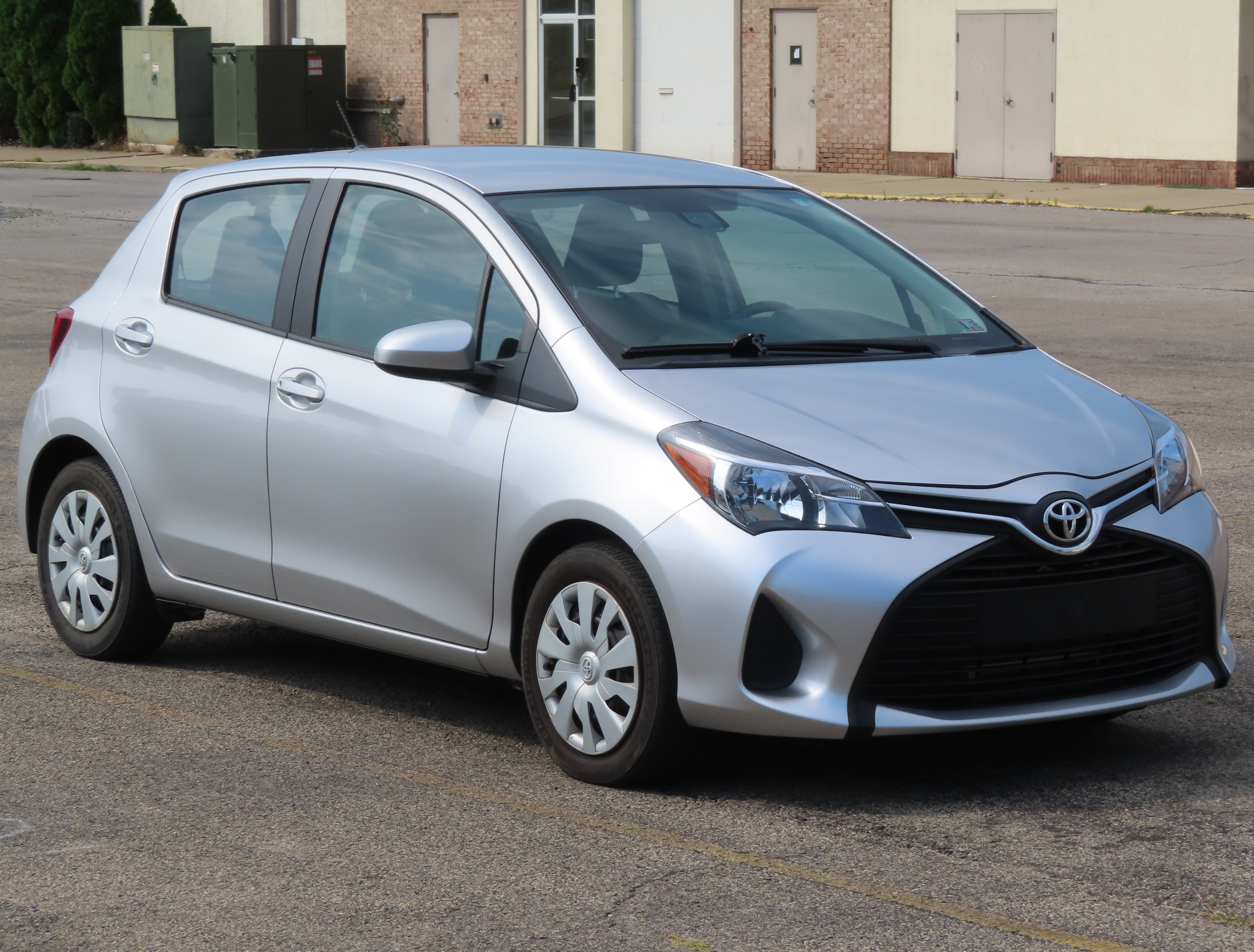
- 2017 Toyota Yaris L 5-door (US)

Overview
- Manufacturer: Toyota
- Also called: Toyota Yaris; Toyota Echo (Oceania and North America, 1999–2005); Daihatsu Charade (Europe, 2011–2013)
- Production: January 1999 – June 2020

Body and chassis
- Class: Subcompact car/Supermini (B)
- Body style: 3/5-door hatchback
- Layout: Front-engine, front-wheel-drive; Front-engine, four-wheel-drive (Japan only)

Chronology
- Predecessor: Toyota Starlet
- Successor: Toyota Yaris (XP210) (Japan, Europe and Australasia); Toyota Yaris hatchback (XP150) (parts of Asia and South Africa); Toyota Yaris hatchback (DJ) (North America)

The Toyota Vitz (Japanese: トヨタ・ヴィッツ, Hepburn: Toyota Vittsu) is a subcompact car produced by the Japanese automobile manufacturer Toyota from 1999 to 2019 in a three- or five-door hatchback body styles. The "Vitz" nameplate was used consistently in Japan, while most international markets received the same vehicle as the Toyota Yaris, or as the Toyota Echo in some markets for the first generation. The Vitz was available in Japan from Toyota's Netz Store dealerships. Toyota began production in Japan and later assembled the vehicle in other Asian countries and in France.

By 2010, the first two generations had achieved in excess of 3.5 million sales in over 70 countries, including more than 1.4 million in Japan.

In 2019, the "Vitz" nameplate was dropped in Japan due to faltering sales and the unification of the Toyota sales network there, and the vehicle was replaced by the XP210 series Yaris. Since 2023, the nameplate has been used for a rebadged third-generation Suzuki Celerio sold in Africa.

== First generation (XP10/XP20; 1999) ==
First generation (XP10)
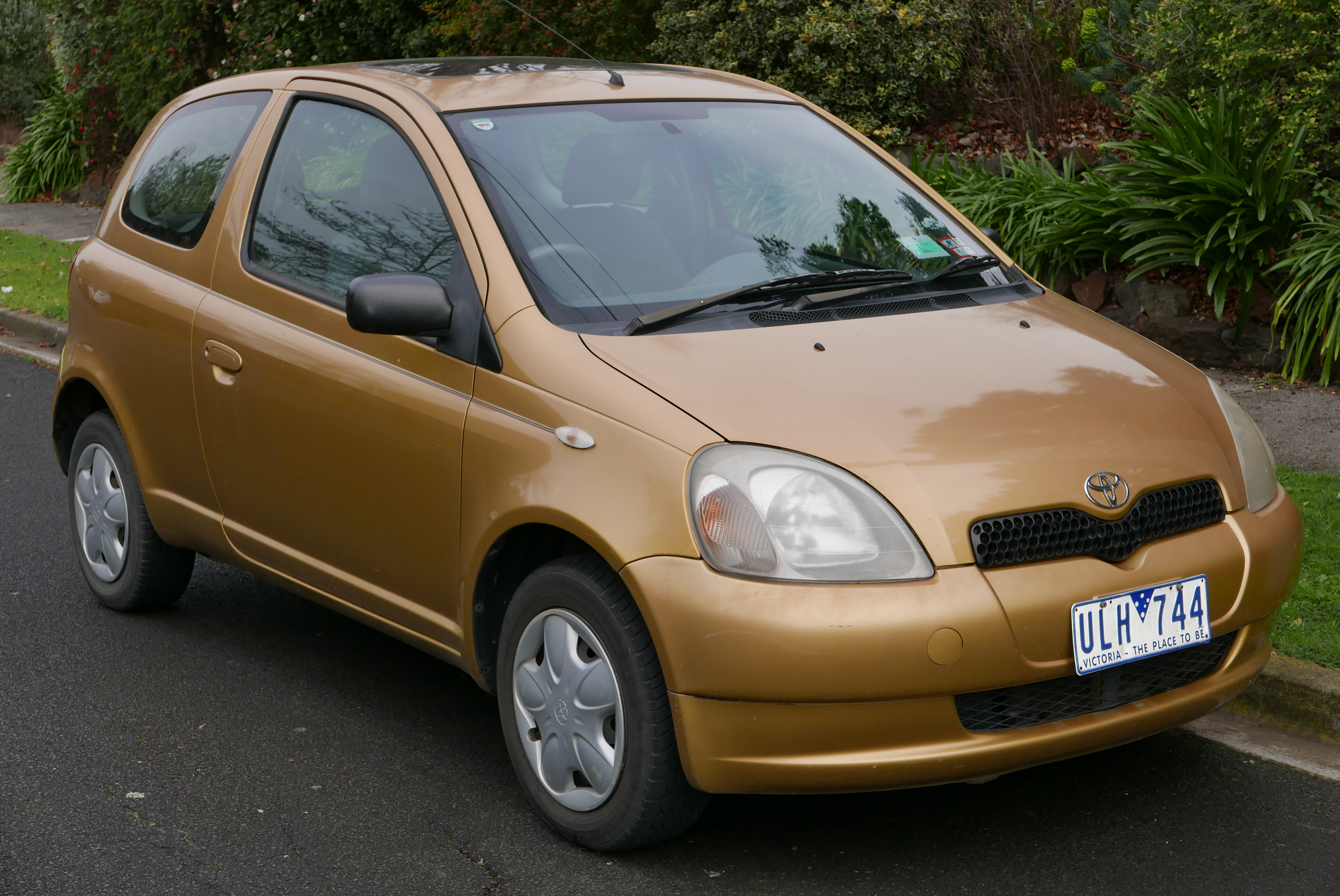
- Pre-facelift

Overview
- Also called: Toyota Yaris (Europe); Toyota Echo (Oceania, North America, Hong Kong, Singapore and the Philippines); Xiali Vizi (China)
- Production: January 1999 – December 2004 (Japan); January 2001 – October 2005 (France); 2002–2012 (China)
- Model years: 1999–2006
- Assembly: Japan: Toyota, Aichi (Takaoka plant); China: Tianjin (Tianjin FAW); France: Onnaing (Toyota Motor Manufacturing France)
- Designer: Hirokazu Ikuma and Sotiris Kovos (1997)

Body and chassis
- Platform: Toyota NBC platform
- Related: Toyota Platz; Toyota Yaris Verso/FunCargo; Toyota Ist/Scion xA (XP60)

Powertrain
- Engine: Petrol: 1.0 L 1SZ-FE I4; 1.3 L 8A-FE I4 (China); 1.3 L 2SZ-FE I4; 1.3 L 2NZ-FE I4; 1.5 L 1NZ-FE I4; 1.5 L 1NZ-FE Turbo I4-T; Diesel: 1.4 L 1ND-TV I4-T
- Power output: 50 kW (67 hp; 68 PS) (1SZ-FE); 65 kW (87 hp; 88 PS) (8A-FE and 2SZ-FE); 64 kW (86 hp; 87 PS) (2NZ-FE); 79 kW (106 hp; 107 PS) (1NZ-FE); 110 kW (148 hp; 150 PS) (1NZ-FTE); 55 kW (74 hp; 75 PS) (1ND-TV)
- Transmission: 5-speed manual + option automatic clutch for the 1.0 L Free-Tronic versions or a MultiMode manual transmission; 4-speed AW80-40LE automatic; CVT (Japan, 1.3 L FWD only; 2002–2004)

Dimensions
- Wheelbase: 2,370 mm (93.3 in)
- Length: 1998–2001: 3,615 mm (142.3 in); 2001–2005: 3,640 mm (143.3 in)
- Width: 1,660 mm (65.4 in)
- Height: 1,500 mm (59.1 in) (FWD); 1,510 mm (59.4 in) (4WD)
- Curb weight: 810–1,010 kg (1,786–2,227 lb)

The first generation XP10 series Vitz was designed by Sotiris Kovos at Toyota's ED2 studio in Europe. It was first unveiled at the 1998 Paris Motor Show. Production began in late 1998, with a Japanese on-sale date of January 1999; European sales commenced two months later as the "Toyota Yaris". When introduced to Australasia in October 1999, the "Toyota Echo" name was used, as was the case in Canada when released there in 2003 for the 2004 model year. The "Echo" and "Yaris" names were also given to the export version of the related Japanese market Toyota Platz sedan, also available as a coupé in North America. Often sold alongside the hatchback and marketed as a single line of vehicles, exterior panels common between the Vitz and Platz were restricted to the front doors. However, as Vitz and Platz were designed using the same platform, the mechanicals are largely identical and both share a common dashboard module. There was also a "Yaris Verso" or "Echo Verso" variant sold in some export markets from late 1999, based on the Japanese "Toyota FunCargo". The Verso MPV utilizes the same running gear as the Vitz, but features a more spacious interior.

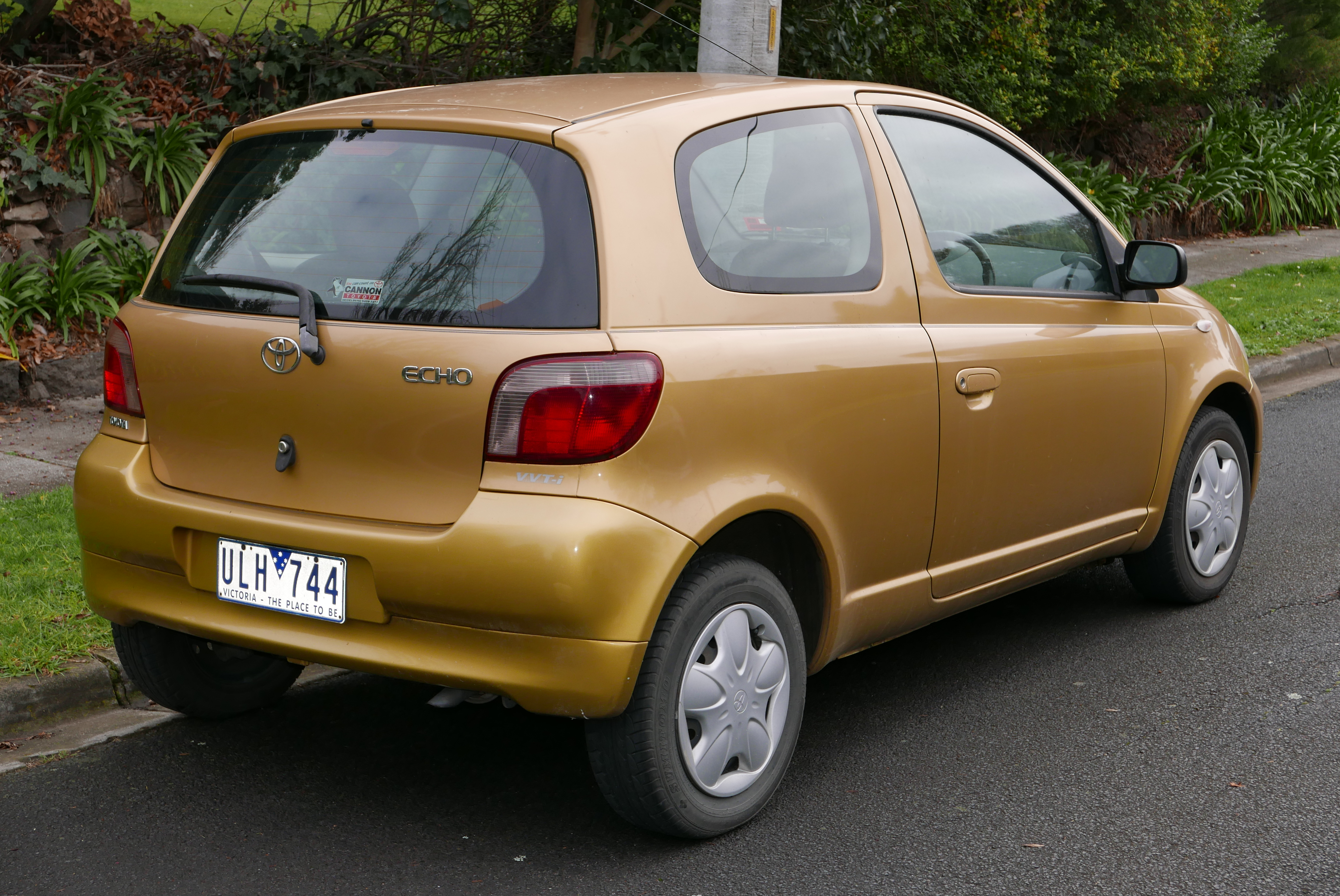
Rear view

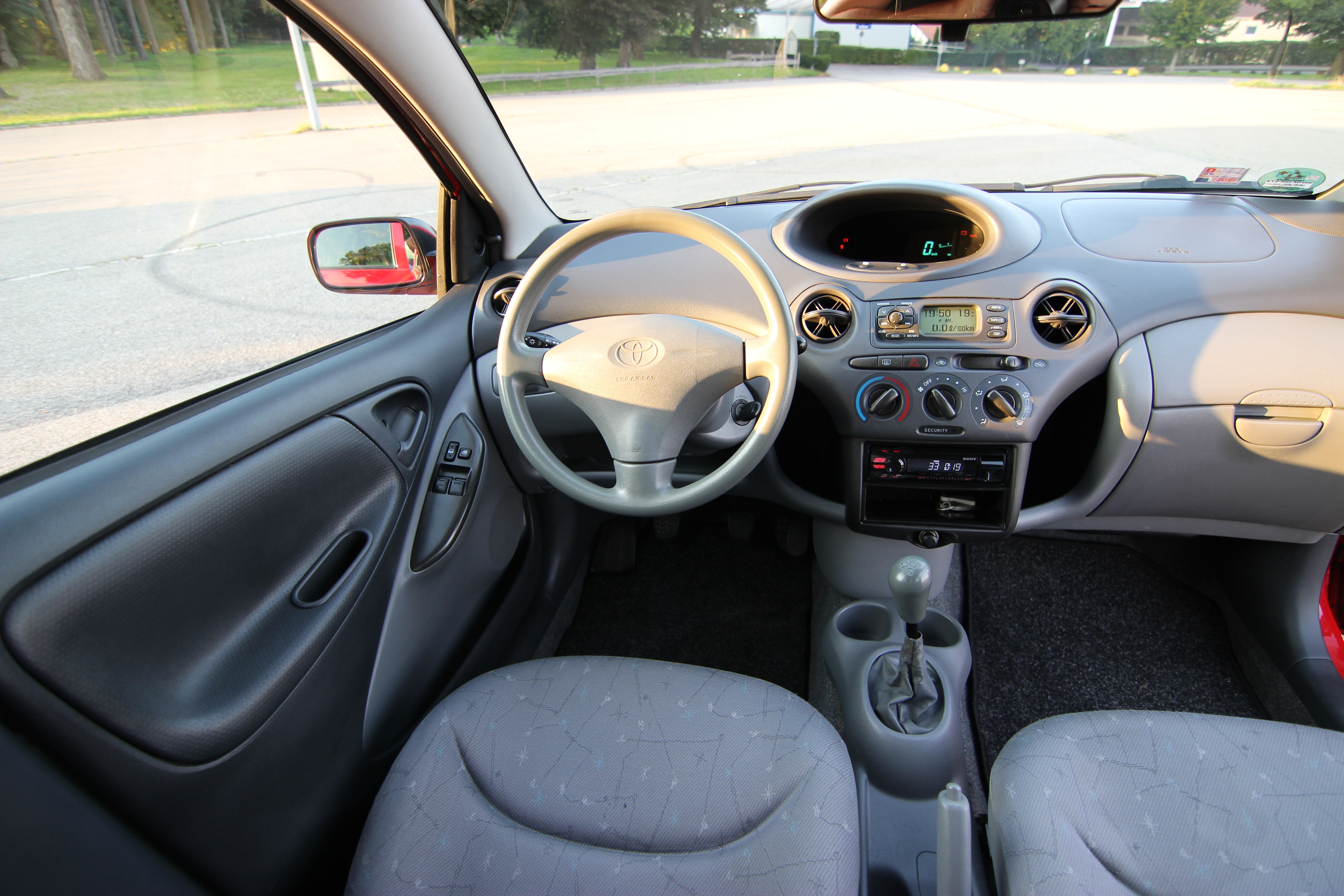
Interior

At its introduction in 1999, it won the Car of the Year Japan Award.

What became the XP10 series was shown earlier in concept form at the 1997 Frankfurt Motor Show. This concept, titled "Funtime" was developed under the leadership of Shuhei Toyoda, who also commissioned two additional models based on the same platform: the "Funcoupe" and the "Funcargo", the predecessor to the forthcoming production model FunCargo. Styled in Brussels by Toyota's European Office of Creation (EPOC), the "Fun project" as it was known, was envisaged to underline the versatility of shared platform engineering. These concept vehicles morphed into the New Basic Car (NBC) program, with each separate NBC model designated a number, NBC1 in the case of the Vitz three-door. The name Vitz is the phonetic Anglicized spelling of the German word Witz which means "wit" (however, its principal meaning in contemporary German is "joke"). Toyota claims the contrived name Yaris is "intended to convey a European impression", while Echo "is intended to Echo nothing."

Instead of conventional analogue instruments, the Vitz utilized digital instruments which were mounted in a "pod" in the center of the dashboard. When sales commenced in the Canadian market this was not the case, with Toyota opting to fit a conventional speedometer, still mounted in the center of the dashboard.

In 2003, the facelifted 'Phase 2' Vitz was released with different bumpers and 'teardrop' front lights.

=== Facelift ===
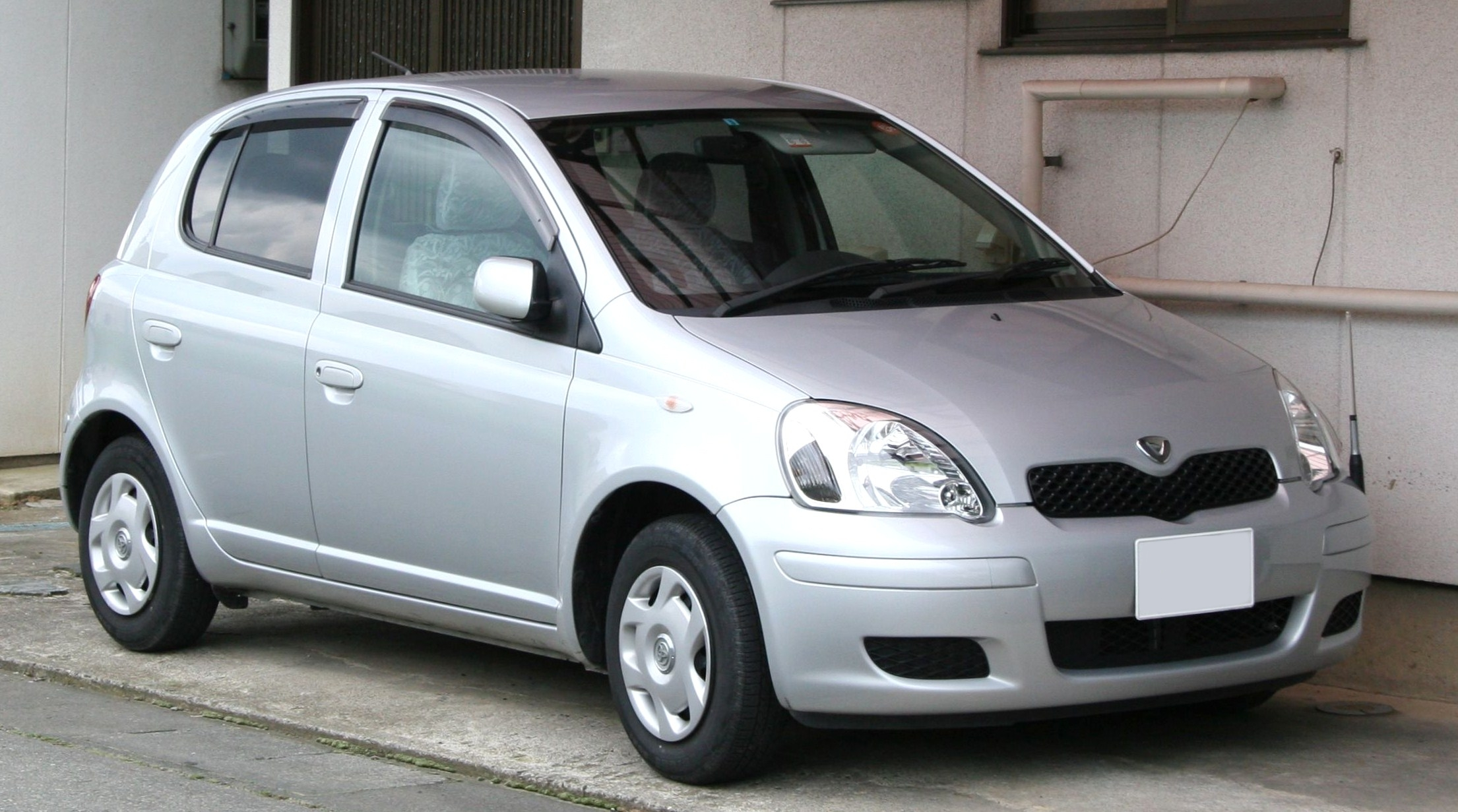
Vitz 5-door (facelift)

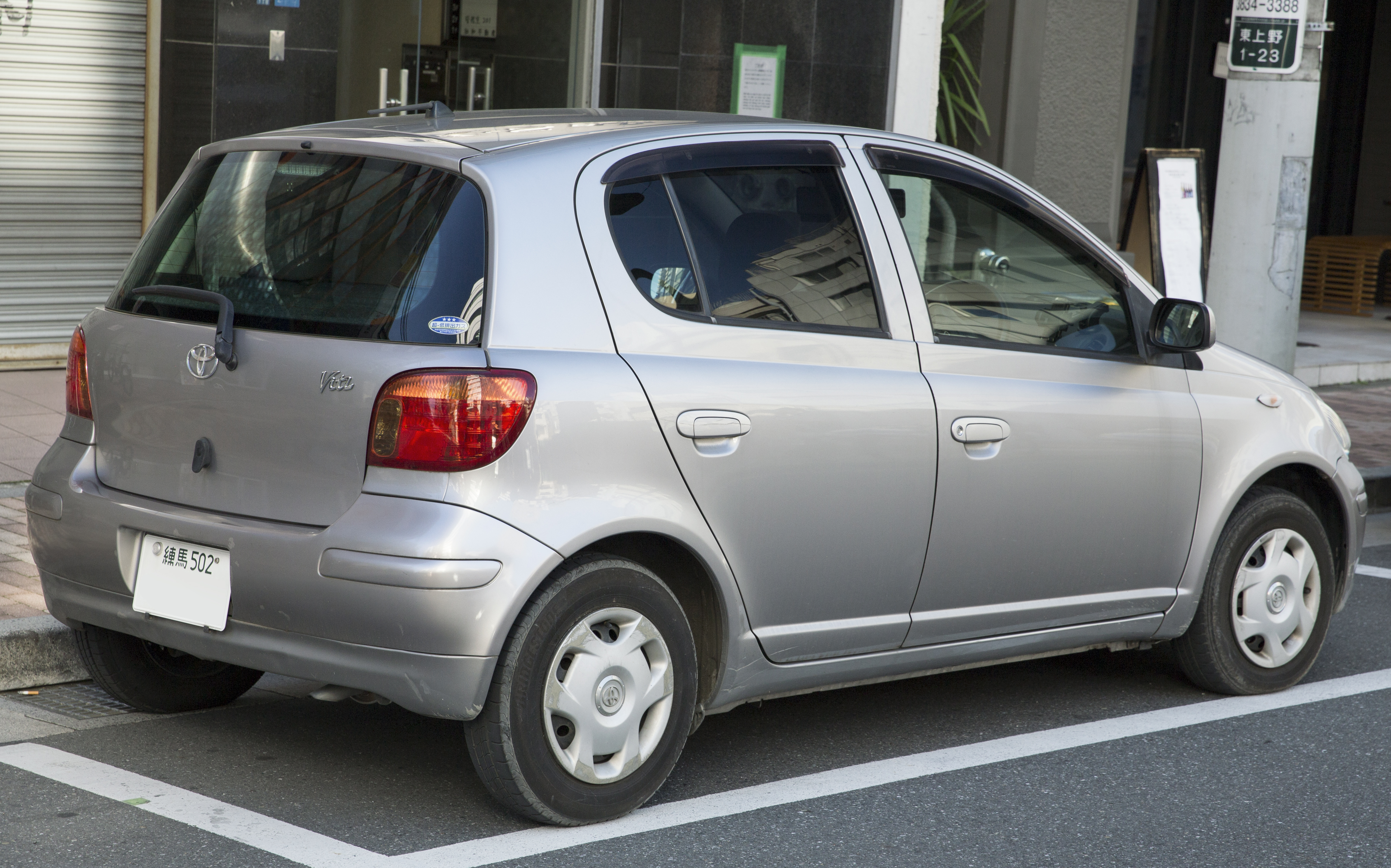
Vitz 5-door (facelift)

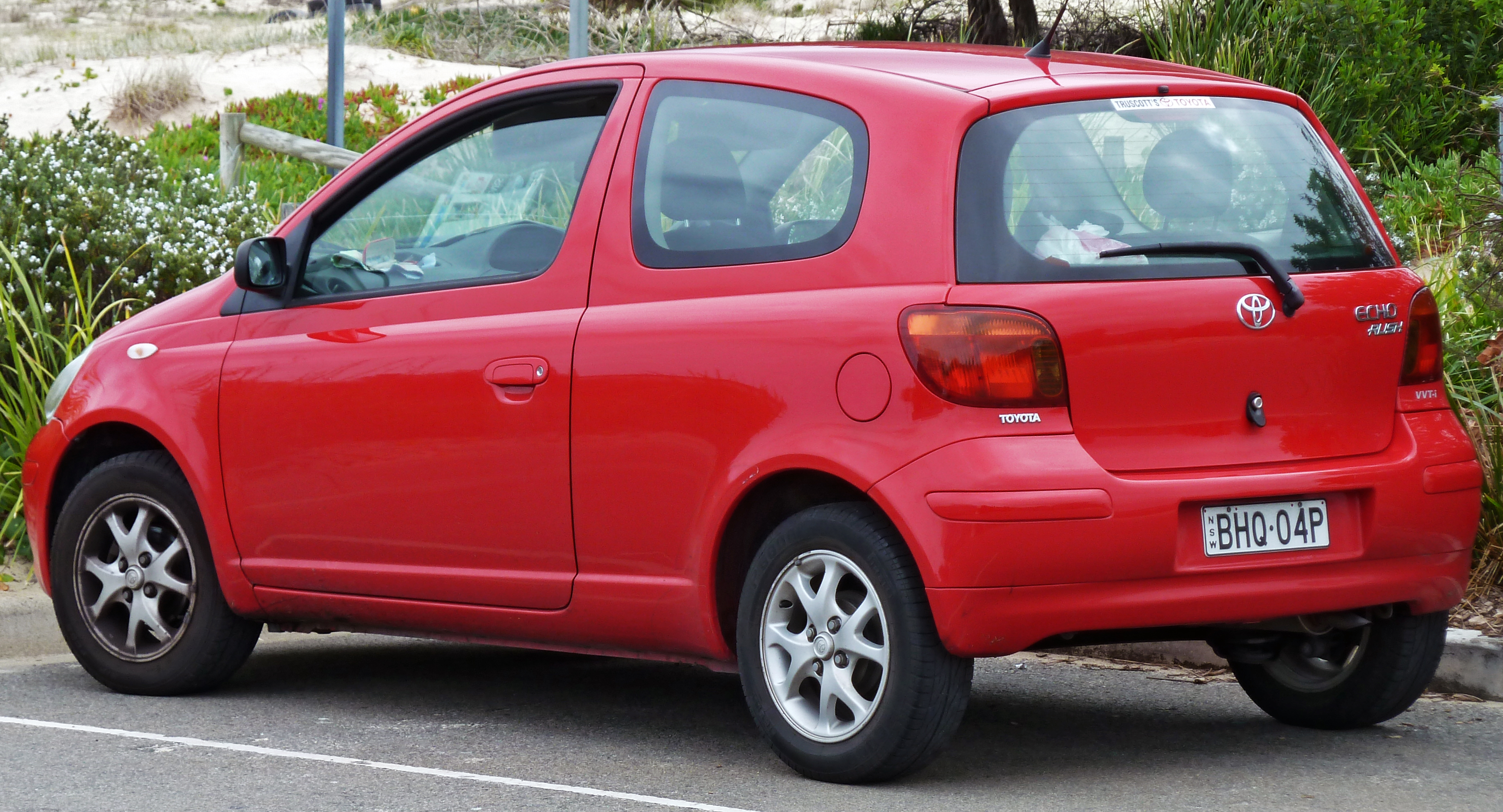
Echo 3-door (facelift)

=== Yaris TS / Vitz RS / Echo Sportivo ===
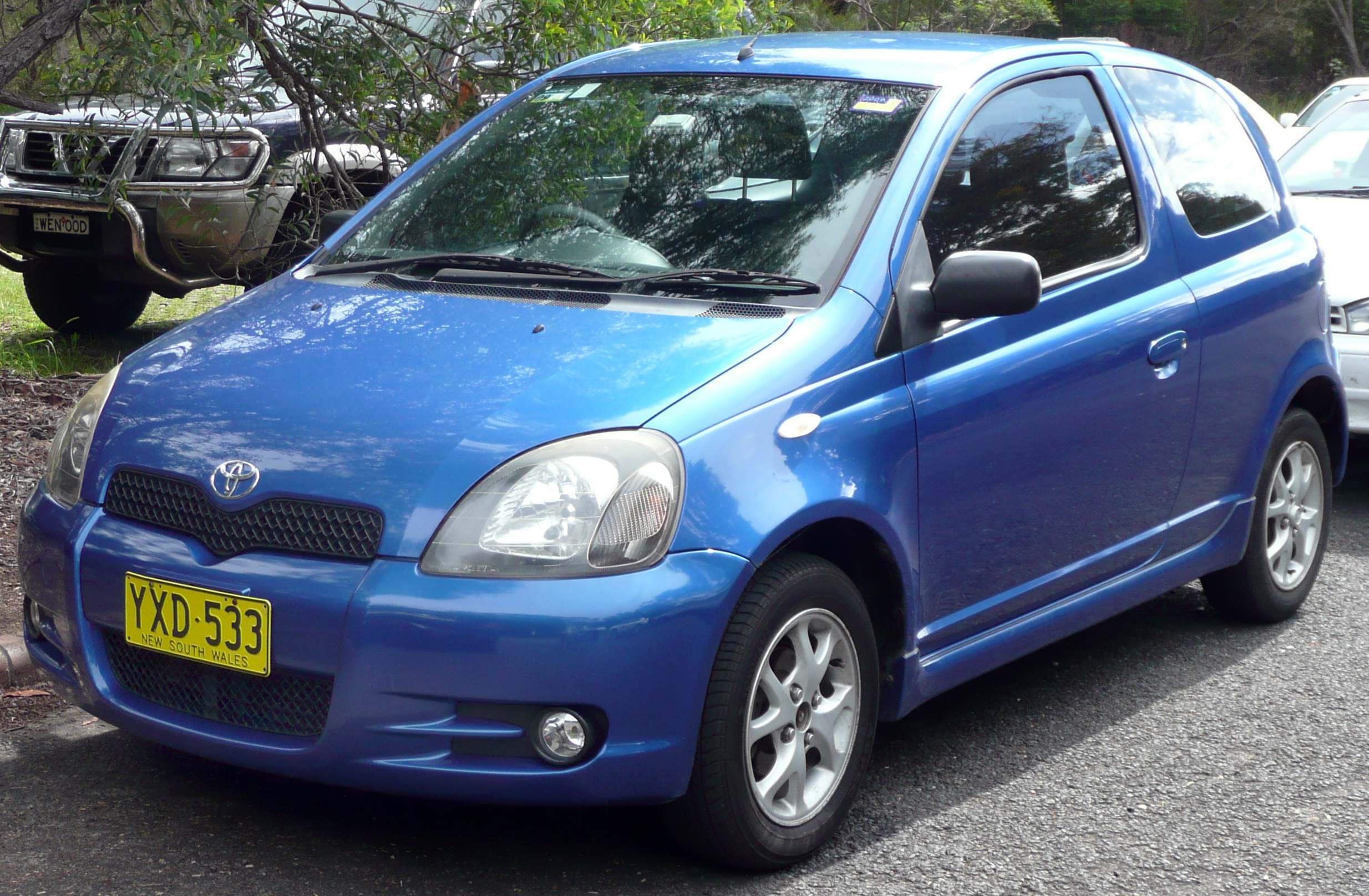
Pre-facelift

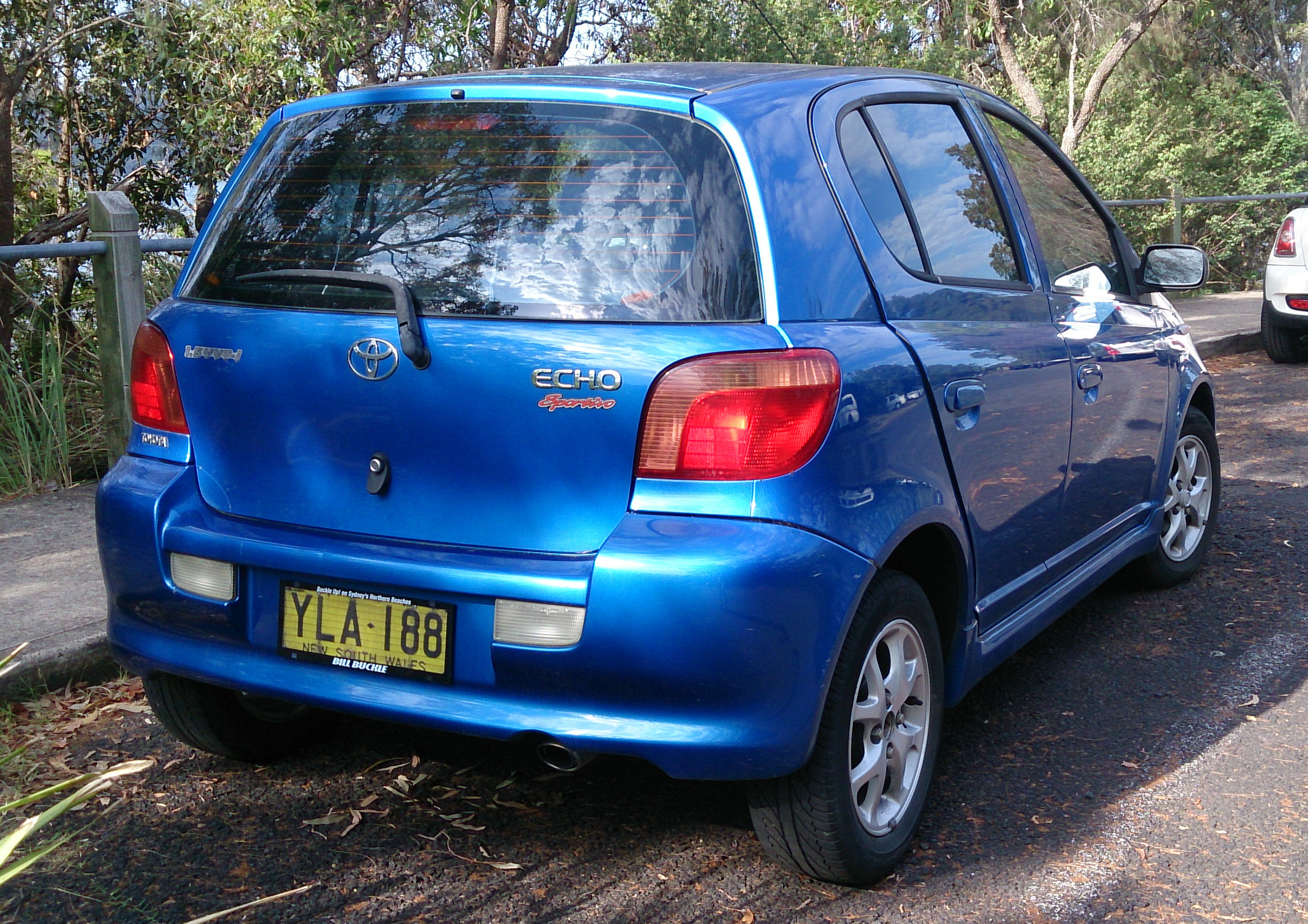
Pre-facelift

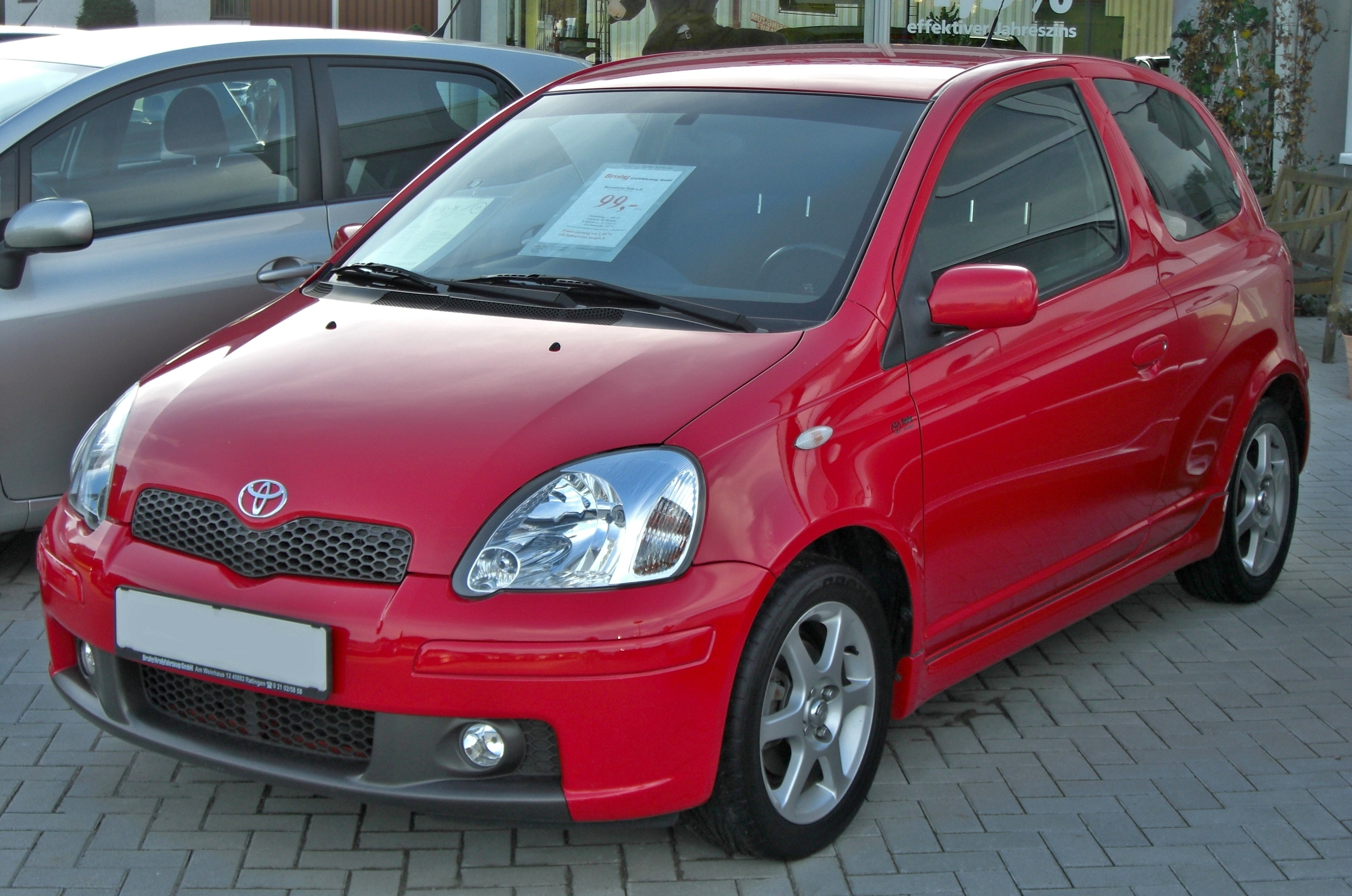
Facelift

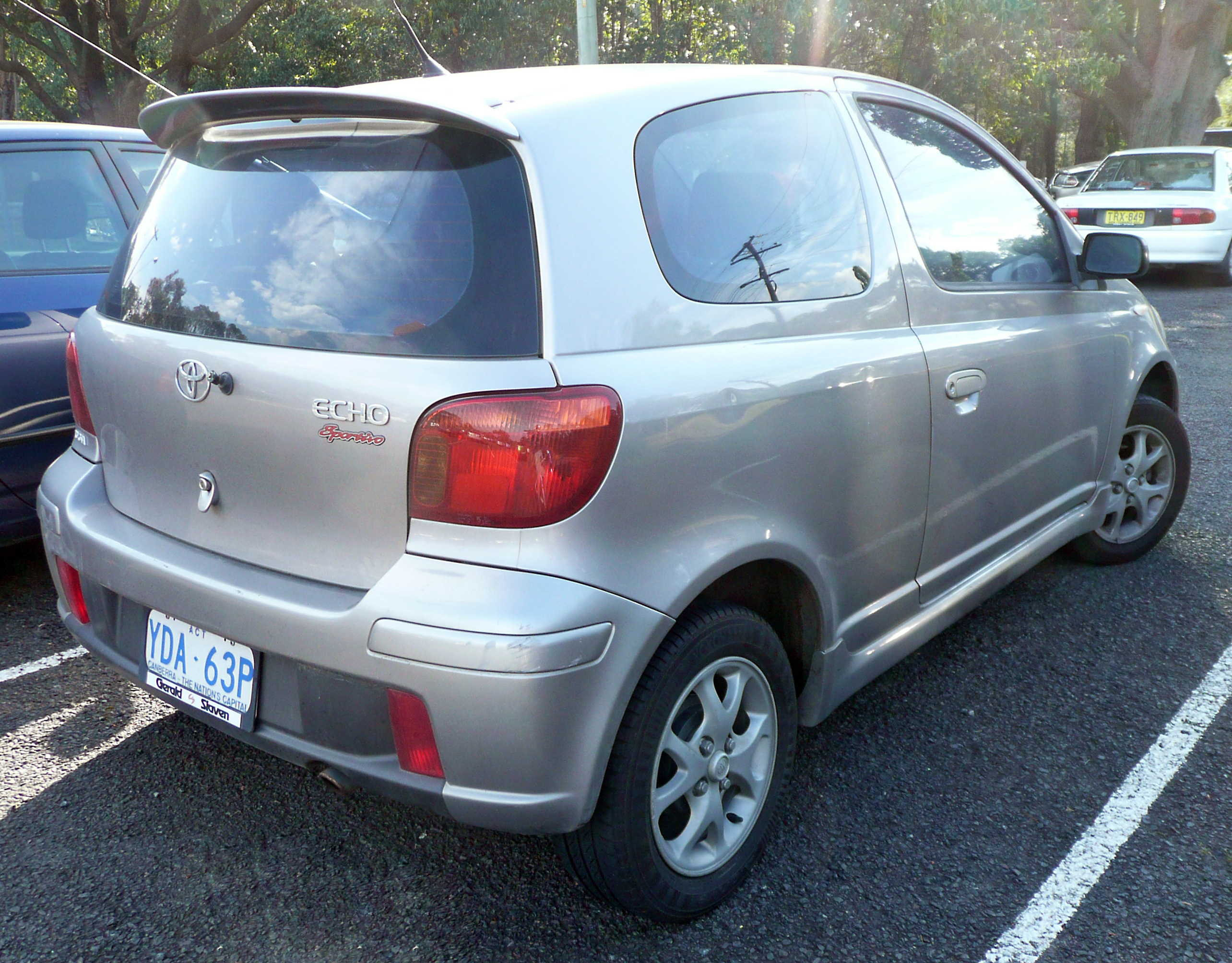
Facelift

=== Safety ===
Occupant safety
Organization	Rating
ANCAP	3/5 stars
Euro NCAP	4/5 stars
UCSR	2/5 stars

Euro NCAP crash tested the dual-airbag equipped XP10 series in 2000, rating the car 29 out of 37 for adult occupant protection, or four out of five stars. The pedestrian rating (pre-2002) is 13 points or two of out of four stars. In July 2004, ANCAP tested the XP10 with only a driver's airbag fitted, resulting in a 23.64 out of 37 grading, or three out of five stars. The 2010 edition of Monash University's Used Car Safety Ratings (UCSR), found that the XP10 provides a "poor" (two out of five stars) level of occupant safety protection in the event of an accident.

ANCAP test results* Toyota Echo 3 door hatch with driver airbag (2000)
Test	Score
Overall	3 /5 stars
Frontal offset	7.64/16
Side impact	16/16
Pole	Not Assessed
Seat belt reminders	0/3
Whiplash protection	Not Assessed
Pedestrian protection	Poor
Electronic stability control	Not Assessed

ANCAP test results* Toyota Echo 3 door hatch with dual frontal airbags (2000)
Test	Score
Overall	4 /5 stars
Frontal offset	12.53/16
Side impact	16/16
Pole	Not Assessed
Seat belt reminders	0/3
Whiplash protection	Not Assessed
Pedestrian protection	Marginal
Electronic stability control	Not Assessed

=== Markets ===
==== Asia ====
The Japanese launch of the Vitz occurred on 13 January 1999, and along with the related Platz, was retailed through the Netz Stores.

The Vitz "RS" was introduced in October 2000. The "RS" featured revised front and rear bumpers, a mesh grille, black-tinted headlamps, front fog lamps, side skirts and alloy wheels. Interior upgrades include, sports-oriented front seats, a leather-wrapped steering wheel, a leather and chrome gear shifter, and metallic door sill scuff plates. Two engines were available in the "RS", the 1.3-litre 84 hp (63 kW) 2NZ-FE and the 1.5-litre 110 hp (82 kW) 1NZ-FE. More powerful brakes and a firmer suspension calibration were also fitted to the "RS".

The Phase 2 Vitz RS was also available in a turbocharged version modified by Toyota Racing Development (TRD) mainly for the domestic Japanese market, and outfitted with an IHI Rhf4 turbocharger with 0.5 bars (7.3 psi) boost. Produced in limited numbers, the TRD-tuned "RS" sported the 1.5-litre engine, and produced 148 hp (110 kW) and offered a 0–100 kilometres per hour (0–62 mph) time of 7.9 seconds.

The Yaris was also sold in China as the Xiali Vizi from December 2002 to 2012, equipped with a 1.0 and 1.3-litre engine.

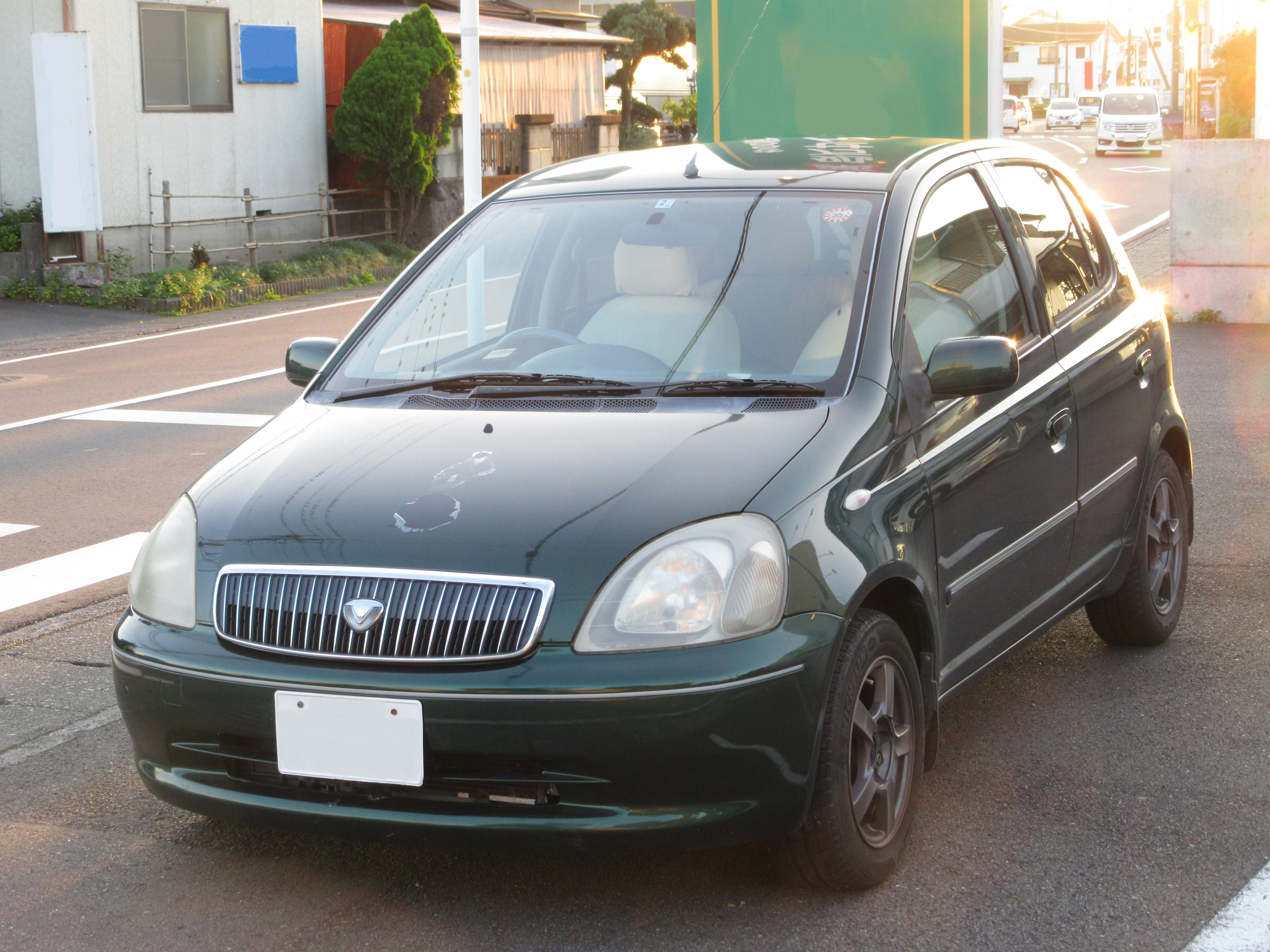
Vitz Clavia 5-door (pre-facelift, Japan)

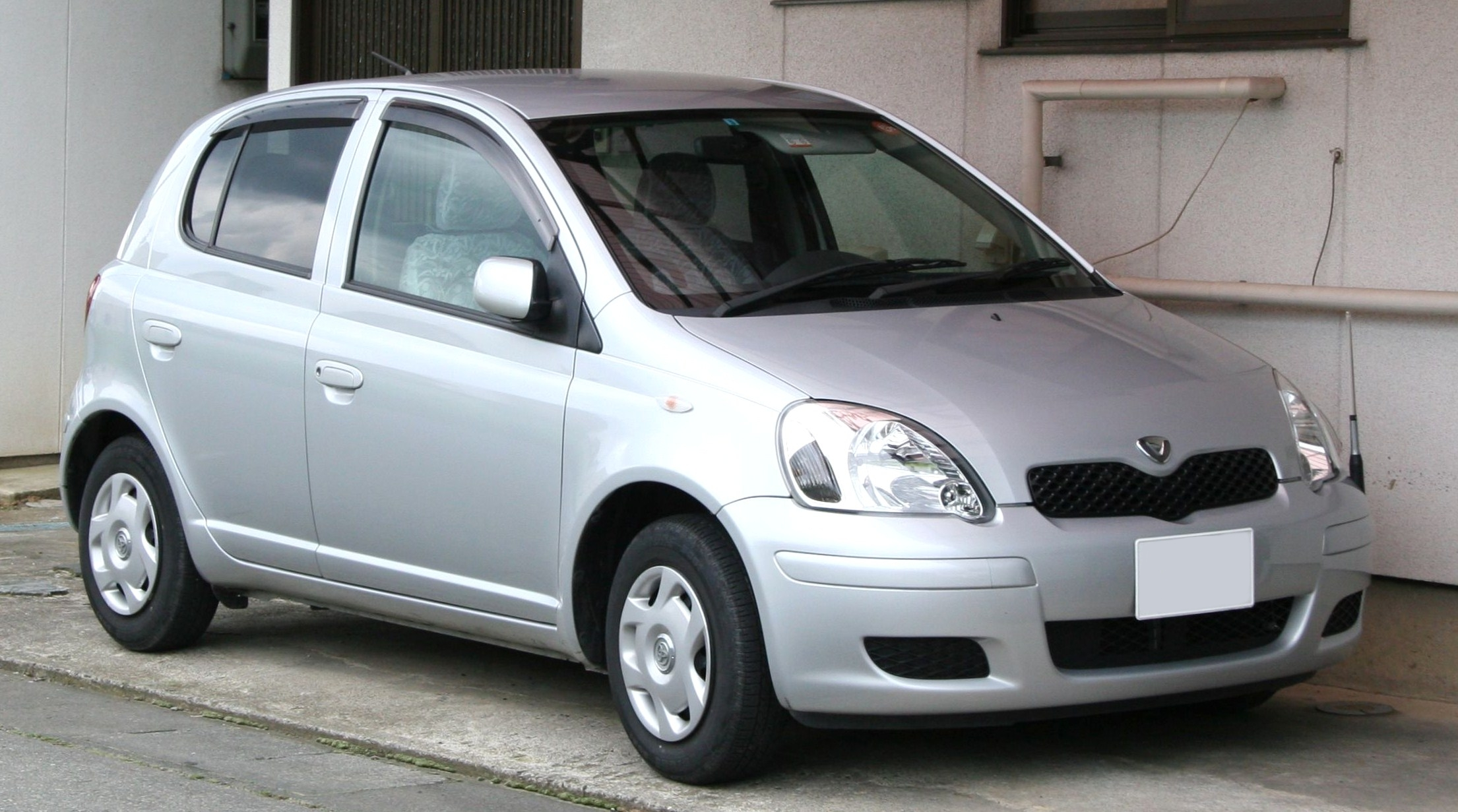
Vitz 5-door (facelift, Japan)

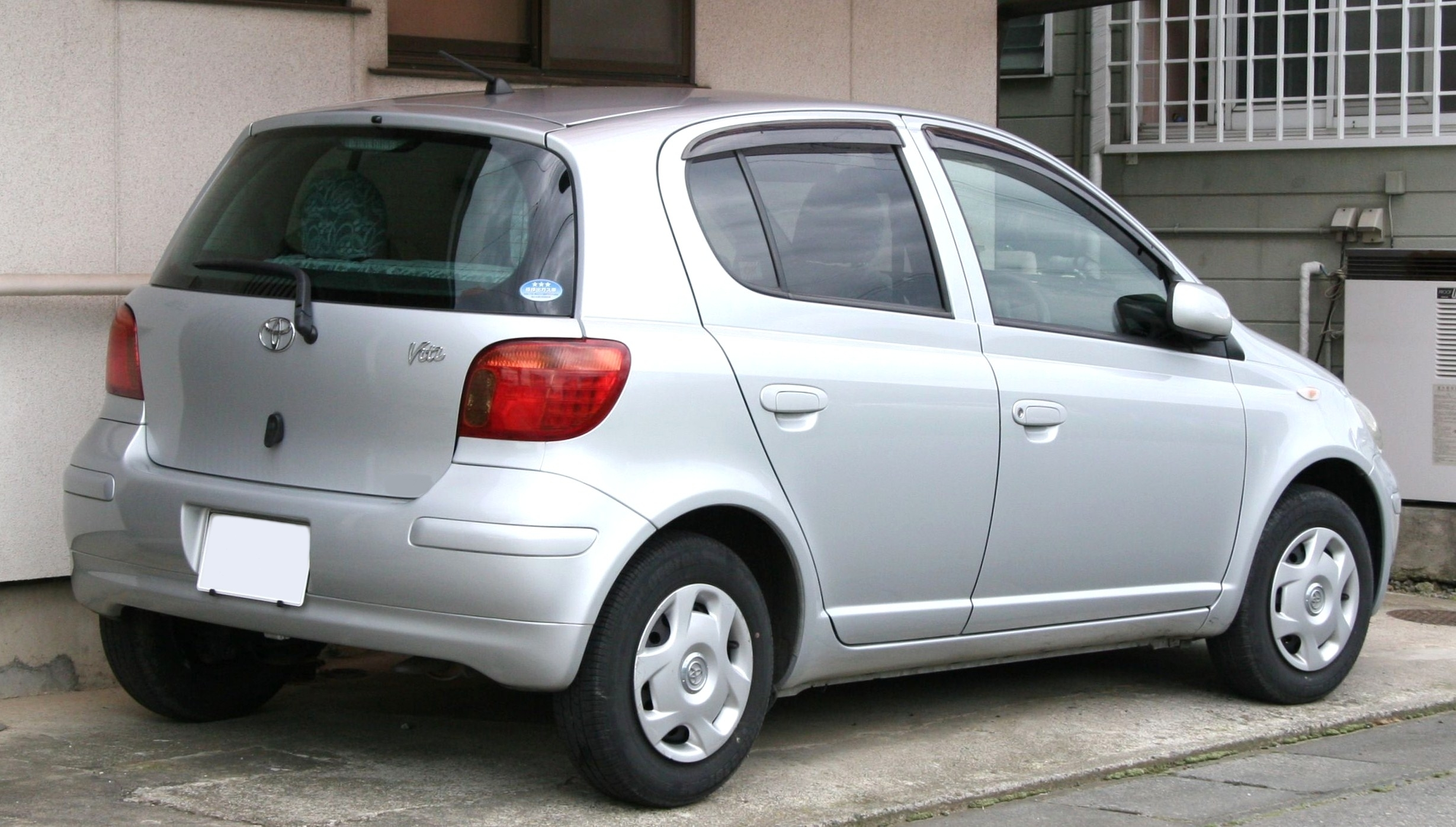
Vitz 5-door (facelift, Japan)

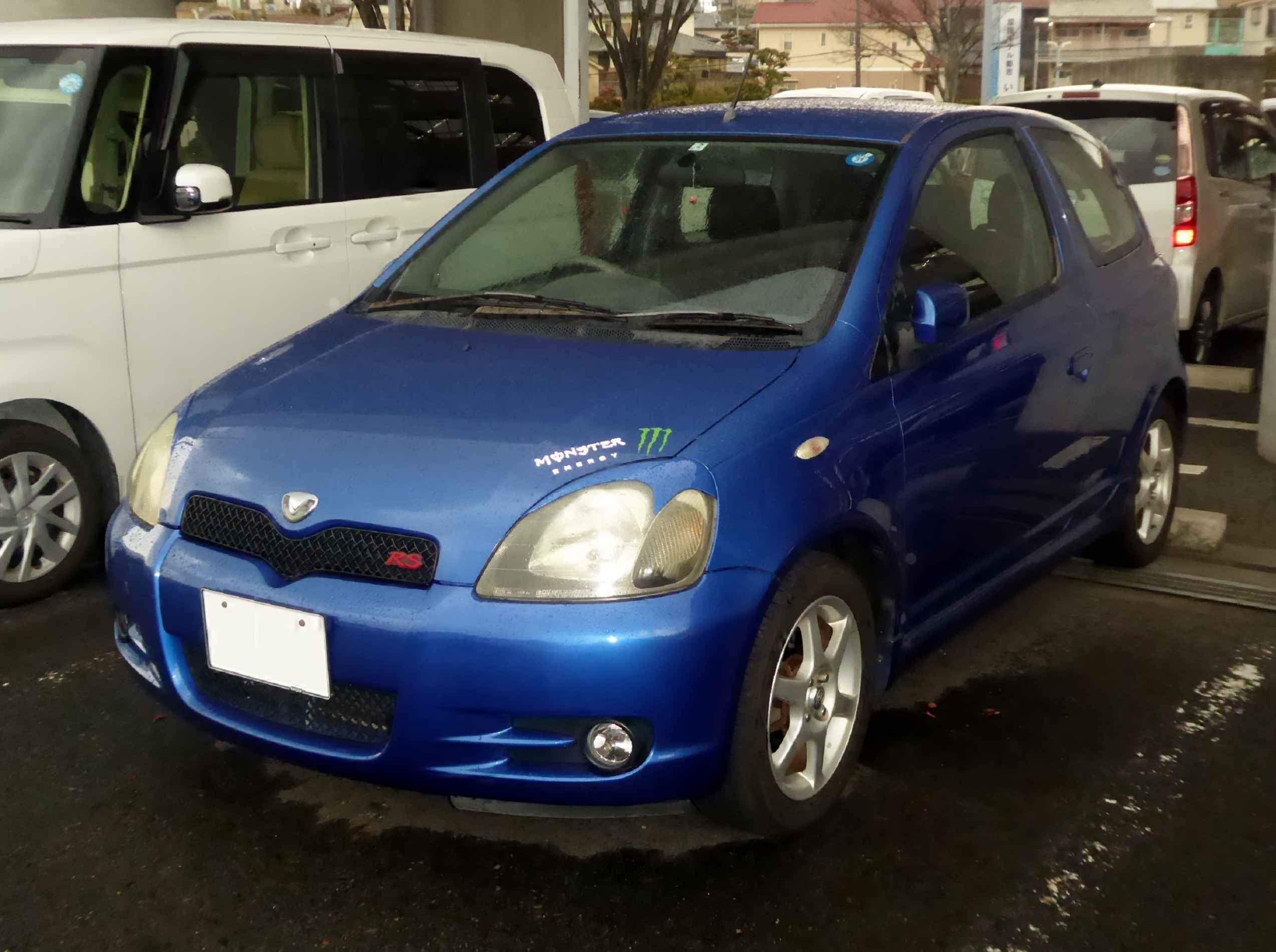
Vitz RS

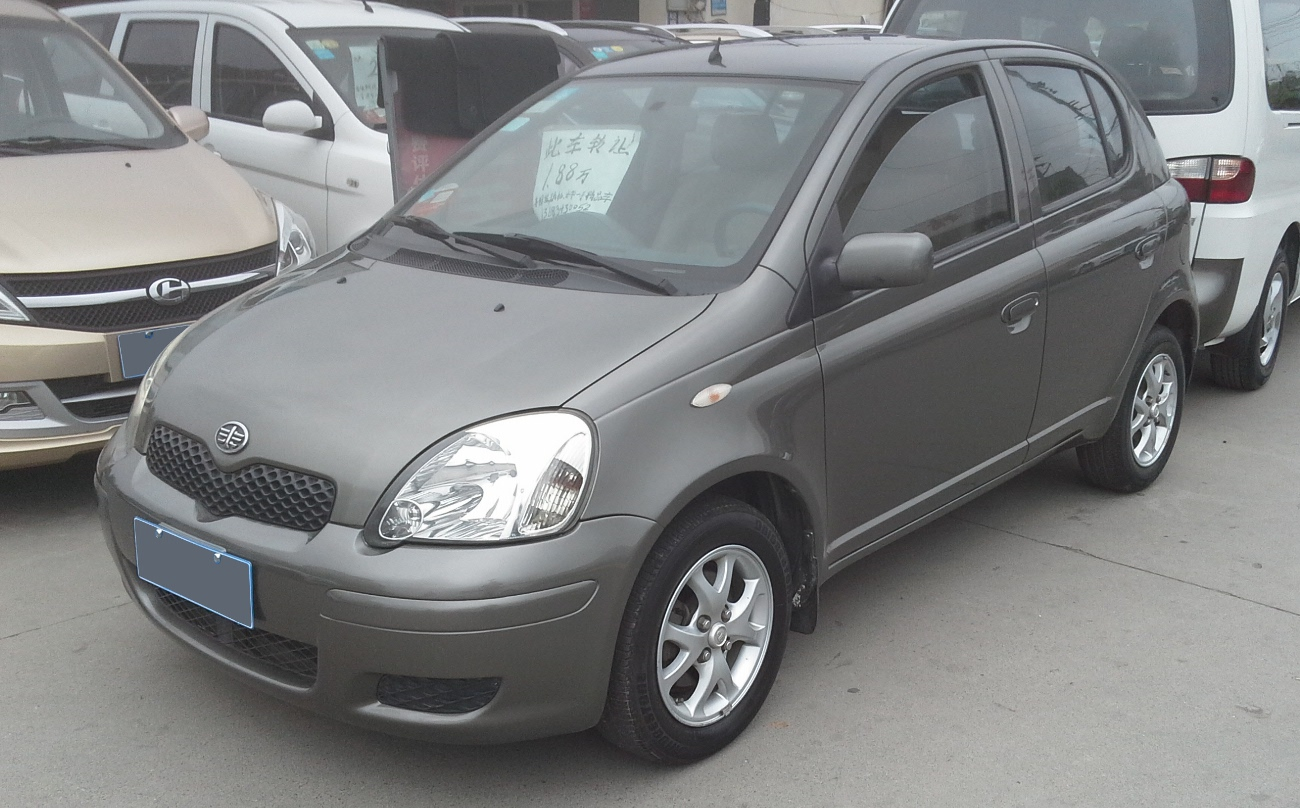
Xiali Vizi (China)

==== Australia ====
The XP10 series was introduced to Australia on 8 October 1999 as the "Echo", replacing the Starlet. Both the three- and five-door hatchback variants were available, which sold alongside the four-door Toyota Platz-derived Echo sedan. Sourced from Japan, Australian-market Echo hatchbacks received the 1.3-litre 2NZ-FE engine with a standard five-speed manual transmission and optional four-speed automatic. The base model was fitted with a driver's airbag and cassette player, although the optional safety pack added a passenger airbag and anti-lock brakes (ABS). Power steering was made standard equipment in October 2002. The Echo "Sportivo" was introduced in March 2001, fitted with the 1.5-litre 1NZ-FE engine with manual transmission only. Compared to the models equivalent to the Echo "Sportivo" in other markets (the Vitz "RS" in Japan, and Yaris "T-Sport" in Europe), the Australian variant is distinguishable with its locally developed T-CAM (Toyota Conversions, Accessories and Motorsport) body kit and downgraded 14-inch alloy wheels.

Sales of the facelifted hatchback range commenced in March 2003. At the same time, the price dropped and standard equipment was increased, with air conditioning, a CD player, and remote keyless entry included, although the safety pack was deleted as an option all together. Consequently, ANCAP tested the Echo in July 2004 and demoted it from a four- to a three-star safety rating. ANCAP had previously based its four-star rating on the test conducted by Euro NCAP, which was performed with the passenger airbag fitted. Following the reassessment, Toyota reintroduced the safety pack from 1 December 2004 for the 2005 model year. In June 2005, Toyota Australia launched the Echo "Rush" three- and five-doors. Additional equipment fitted over the base model included 14-inch alloy wheels, front power windows, and front fog lamps.

==== Europe ====
The Vitz, marketed as the "Yaris" in Europe, was initially available with gasoline-powered inline-four engines in displacements of 1.0 and 1.3-litres, both featuring Toyota's VVT-i technology. The use of sophisticated engine management systems was said to give the equivalent of 1.4-litre performance from the 70 hp (52 kW) 1.0-litre engine, while maintaining low fuel consumption and emissions. In 2001, the range was expanded via the addition of the hot hatch "T Sport" (equivalent to the Vitz "RS" in Japan), fitted with the 1.5-litre engine. After March 2002, a 1.4-litre D4-D diesel engine offering 75 hp (56 kW) was also included in the lineup.

In most European markets, the Yaris was a stronger seller than the Starlet that it replaced. The XP10 was voted European Car of the Year in 2000, and also the 2000 Semperit Irish Car of the Year.

From 31 January 2001, the Yaris was produced in the Toyota Motor Manufacturing France (TMMF), in Onnaing, to supplement Japanese-made units.

European-market Yaris was also exported to Israel as well as in Morocco.

During the arrival of its successor, the first-generation Yaris had sold over 1.2 million units in Europe.

==== North America ====
The Vitz hatchback was not sold in North America until February 2003, when it launched only in Canada under the "Echo" name for the 2004 model year. Prior to this, only the Platz-based Echo sedan and coupé were available in Canada. The hatchback (three and five doors) was introduced in Canada only due to the higher sales achieved by the sedan and coupé compared to the United States, where they have failed due to low demand. Minor changes were made to meet Canadian safety requirements such as larger bumpers. The Echo hatchback was offered in four different trims in Canada, the LE being the standard version available in three or five door variants. The CE was an economy version only available with three doors and did not feature power steering, a rear wiper or a four-way speaker system, while the RS was only available with five doors and featured an aero package, aluminium alloy wheels, leather-wrapped steering wheel and shift knob along with sport seats.

Although an RS version was offered, it consisted of cosmetic changes only. All Canadian-bound Echo hatches were sold with the 1.5-litre 1NZ-FE engine and rated at 108 hp (81 kW).

In 2004, for the 2005 model year, a tachometer was added.

=== Yaris Cabrio Concept (2000) ===
The Yaris Cabrio concept car was presented at the March 2000 Geneva Motor Show. The Yaris Cabrio featured a fabric roof. It never reached the production stage. Another similar concept based on the XP150 series Yaris was showcased at the 23rd Gaikindo Indonesia International Auto Show in August 2015, being called Yaris Legian.

== Second generation (XP90; 2005) ==
Second generation (XP90)
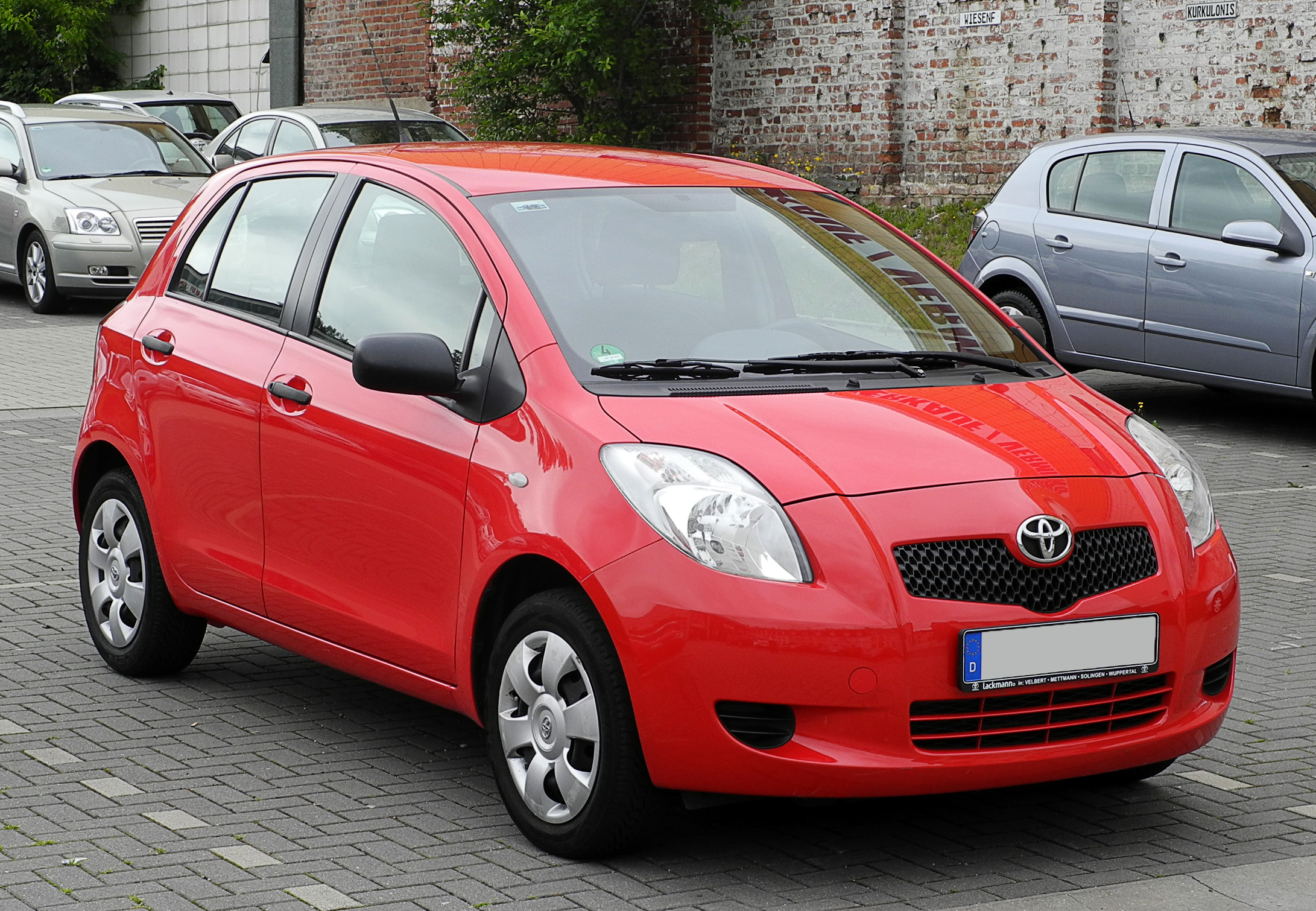
- Pre-facelift

Overview
- Also called: Toyota Yaris (international); Daihatsu Charade (Europe, 2011–2013); Leahead i1 (China)
- Production: January 2005 – November 2010 (Japan); November 2005 – May 2011 (France); 2006–2013 (Asia); 2008–2016 (China); 2011–2013 (Daihatsu Charade)
- Model years: 2006–2011
- Assembly: Japan: Kanegasaki, Iwate (Toyota Motor East Japan); Ōbu, Aichi (Toyota Industries); China: Guangzhou; France: Onnaing (Toyota Motor Manufacturing France); Taiwan: Zhongli (Kuozui); Thailand: Chachoengsao (TMT)
- Designer: Sotiris Kovos, Yuji Fujiwara and Takashi Hagino

Body and chassis
- Platform: Toyota B platform
- Related: Toyota Belta/Vios (XP90); Toyota Ractis (XP100); Toyota Ist/Urban Cruiser (XP110)

Powertrain
- Engine: Petrol: 1.0 L 1KR-FE I3; 1.3 L 2SZ-FE I4; 1.3 L 2NZ-FE I4; 1.3 L 1NR-FE I4; 1.5 L 1NZ-FE I4; 1.5 L 1NZ-FTE I4; 1.6 L 4ZR-FE I4; 1.8 L 2ZR-FE I4; Diesel: 1.4 L 1ND-TV I4-T
- Transmission: 5-speed manual or a MultiMode manual transmission; 6-speed manual (Facelift 1.33 and 1.4 D4D); 4-speed automatic; CVT

Dimensions
- Wheelbase: 2,460 mm (96.9 in)
- Length: 2005–2008: 3,750 mm (147.6 in); 2008–2010: 3,785 mm (149.0 in); 3,800 mm (149.6 in) (TRD); 3,915 mm (154.1 in) (China)
- Width: 1,695 mm (66.7 in)
- Height: 1,485–1,505 mm (58.5–59.3 in) (TRD); 1,520 mm (59.8 in) (FWD); 1,540 mm (60.6 in) (4WD)
- Curb weight: 980–1,110 kg (2,161–2,447 lb)

Chronology
- Successor: Toyota Yaris (XP150) (parts of Asia)

Toyota redesigned the Vitz in early 2005, going on sale in Japan that February. The Yaris family (Vitz and including the Belta) was developed under the lead of chief engineer Kousuke Shibahara. While the previous generation Vitz hatchback and Platz sedan look and feel virtually alike, the redesigned XP90 Vitz and Belta are more subtly related in terms of appearance. The two cars share underpinnings, notably the frame and the drivetrain components, however the sheet metal and interior is different. While the Vitz was designed at Toyota's European ED^{2} design studios, the Belta was designed at their Japanese design studios.

The Vitz platform was larger in all metrics, to create a larger interior space on par with vehicles in the segment above. It had a short overhangs and cab-forward design. The Vitz has nine airbags for some models.

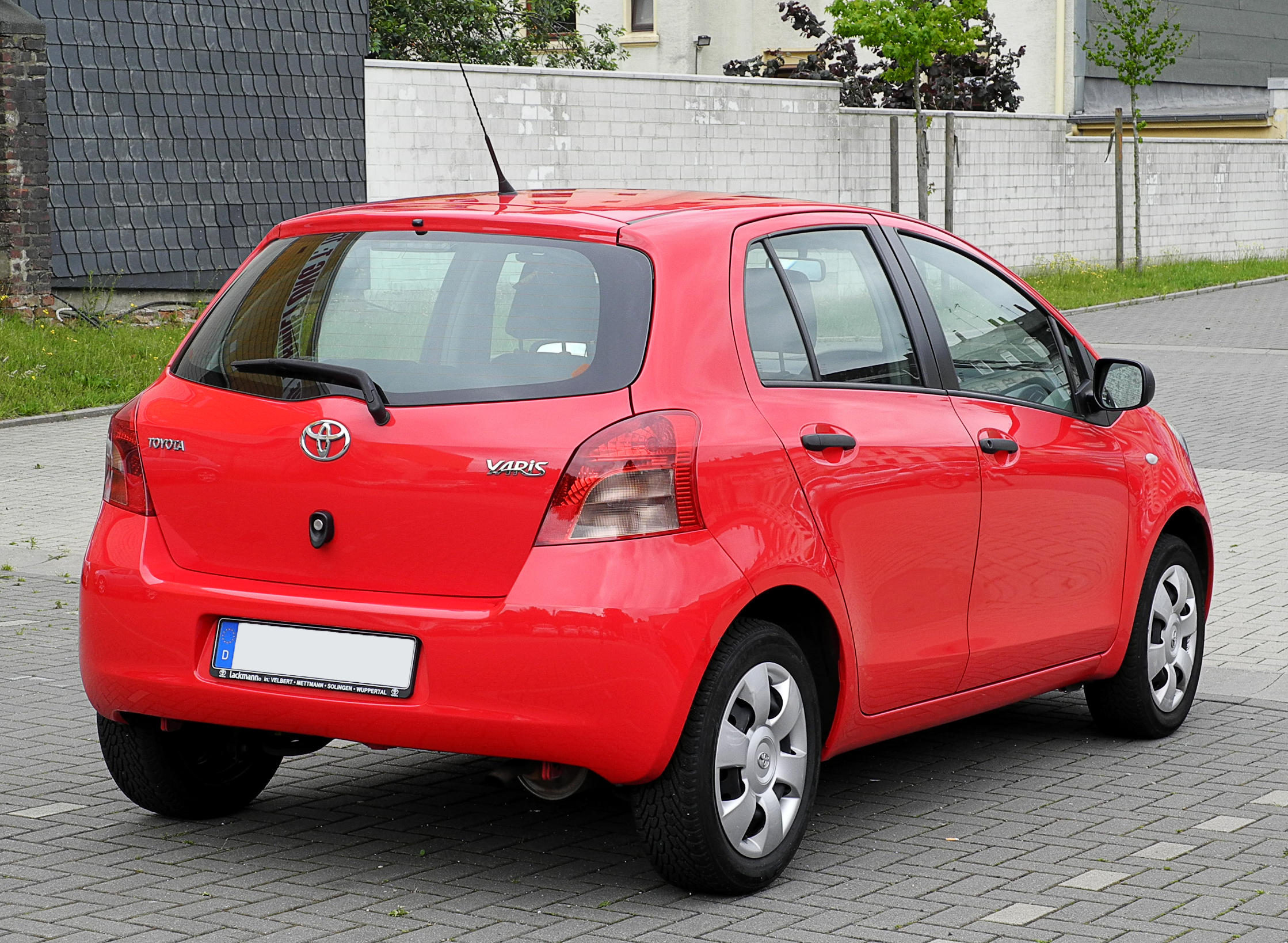
Yaris 5-door (pre-facelift)

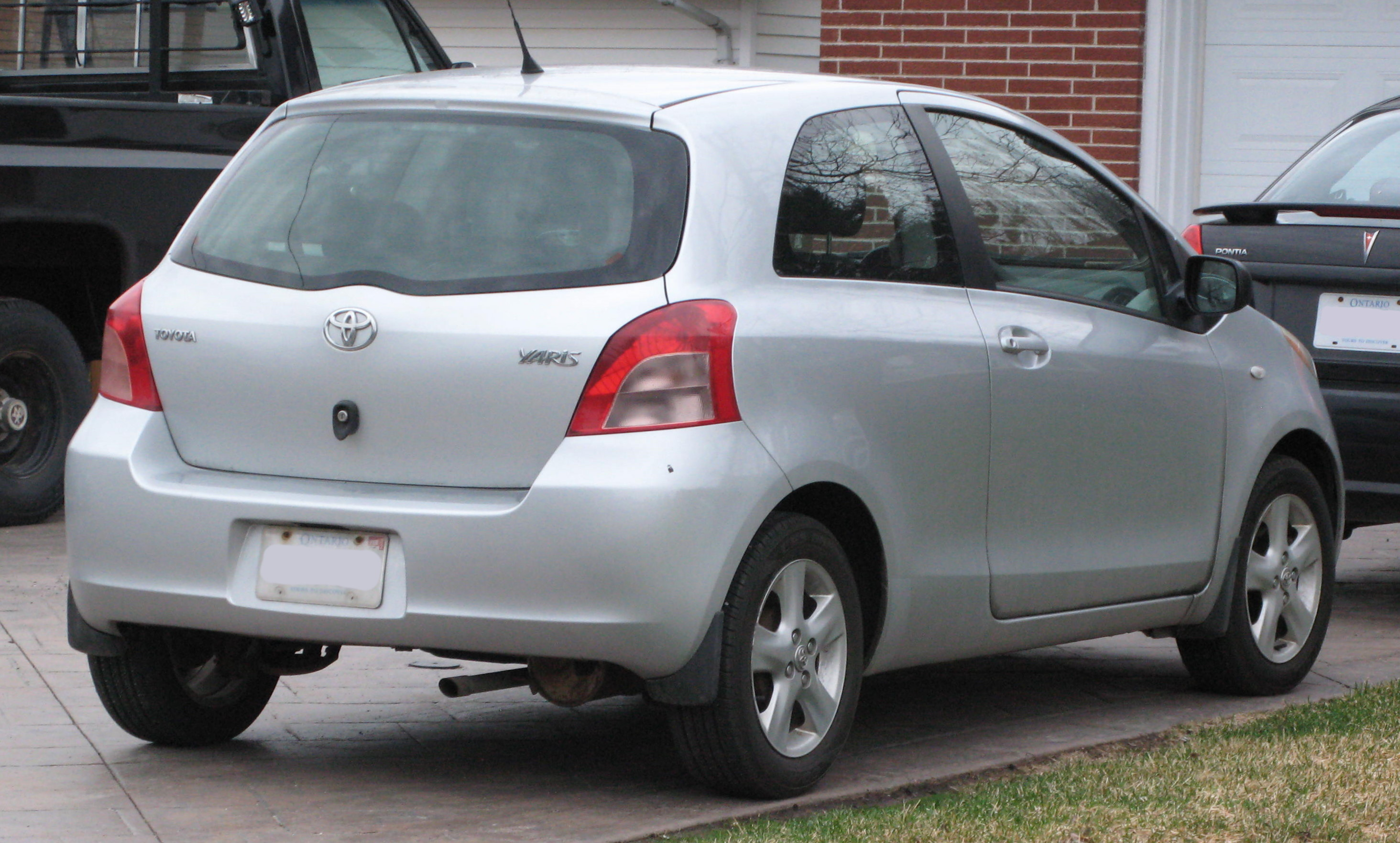
Yaris 3-door (pre-facelift)

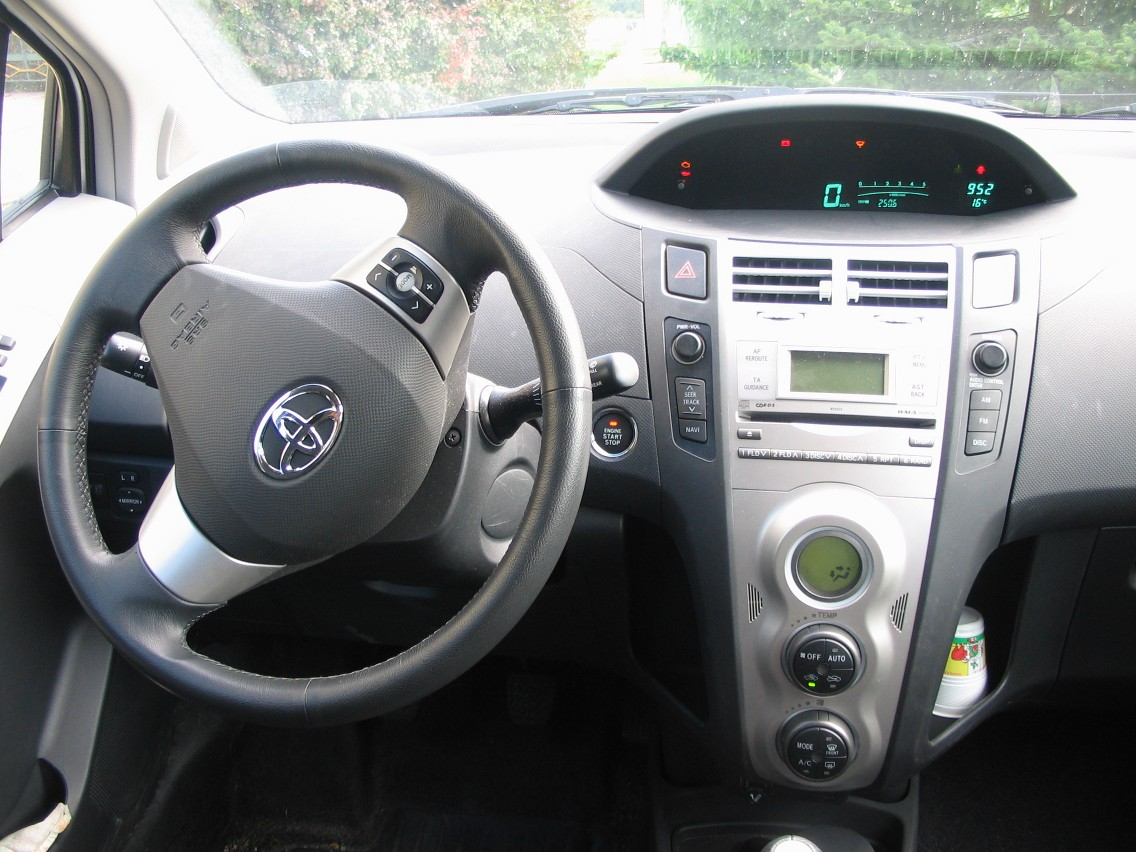
Interior

The European, Australian, Canadian, Mexican, Venezuelan and Puerto Rican markets received the second-generation Vitz near the end of 2005. In the Australia and North America, the car was sold under the Yaris nameplate for the first time; the Belta is also sold there but with the nameplate Yaris sedan. The production Yaris for the US market was unveiled at the Los Angeles Auto Show in January 2006. The XP90 series Yaris was built in Japan, France, Thailand, China and Taiwan.

The previous 4-cylinder 1.0 VVT-i engine was replaced by the 3-cylinder engine also found in the Toyota Aygo. The 1.3-litre engine was revised to offer slightly more power, and the 1.4 D-4D got a 15 PS (11 kW; 15 hp) boost to 90 PS (66 kW; 89 hp), the former engine allowing it to achieve exceptional fuel economy. For the European market in early 2009 the Yaris added a 1.33-litre engine with Stop & Start technology.

The Vitz also received a minor facelift in 2009 with slight subtle revisions to its bumper with in-built cornering protectors, revised air dams and fog-lamps and revised tail lights. In the interior, the facelift received minor revision to the climate rotary knobs.

=== Facelift ===
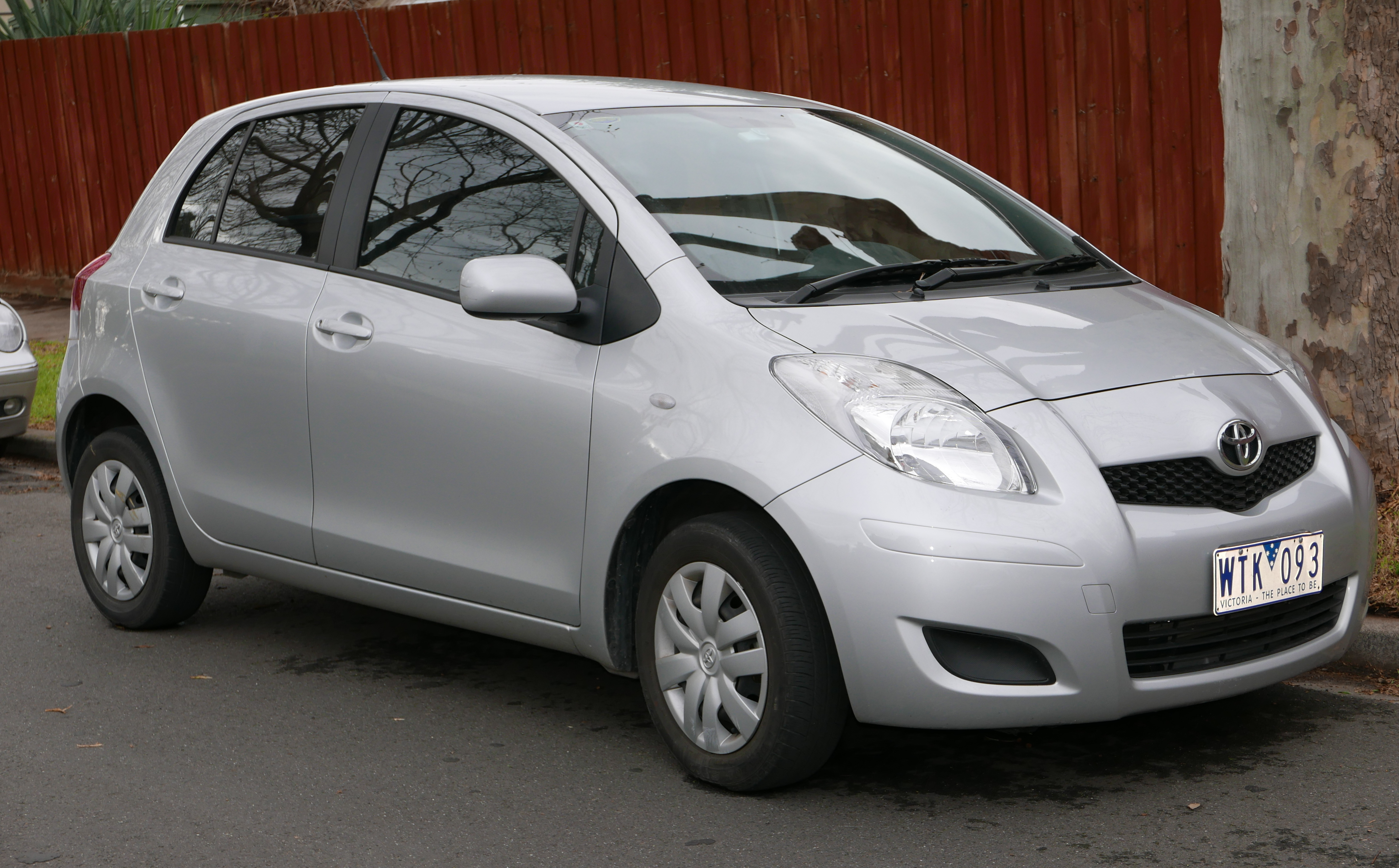
Facelift

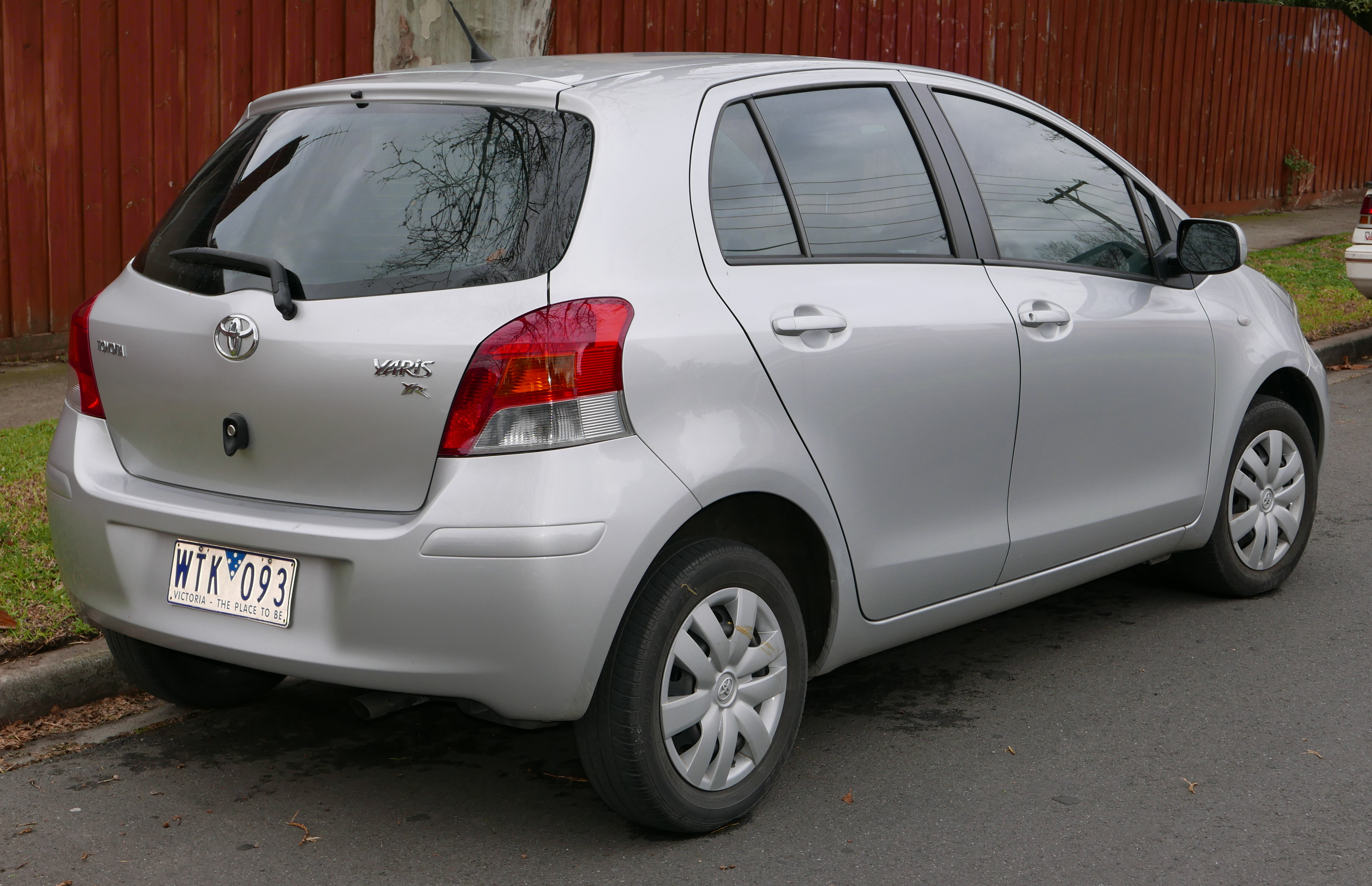
Rear view

==== Second facelifts ====
The XP90 series Yaris continued to be built in China and Thailand until it was replaced by the XP150 model in November 2013.

In China, the Yaris received a second facelift in 2011, which has an extended front body which brings the car to measure 3,915 mm (154.1 in) in length and a new chrome grille.

For Thailand-made models (also exported to Southeast Asian countries such as Indonesia and the Philippines), in February 2012 the Yaris received front and rear bumpers, rear LED tail lights from the facelifted Vitz RS/Yaris TS, and updated steering wheel.

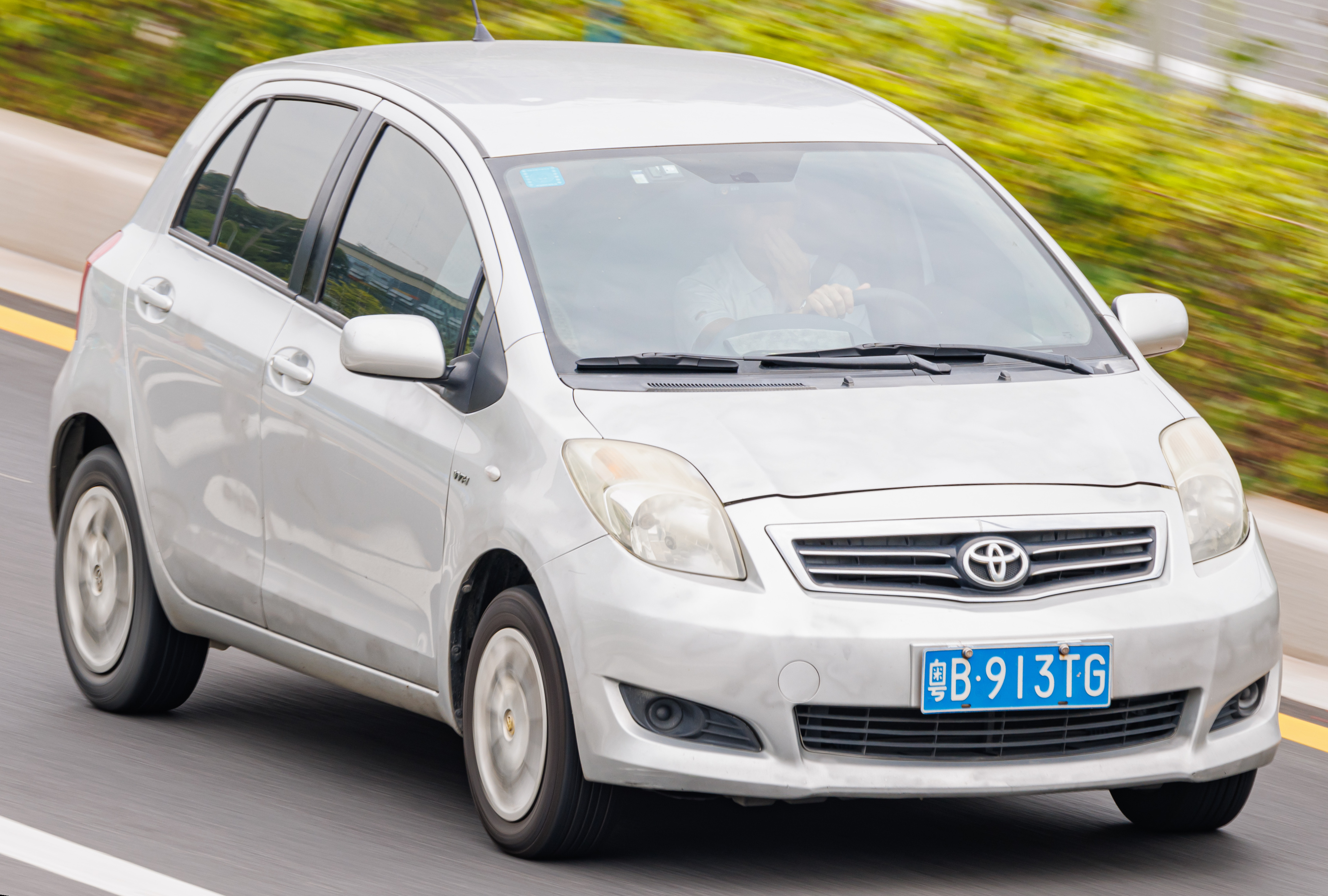
Second facelift (China)

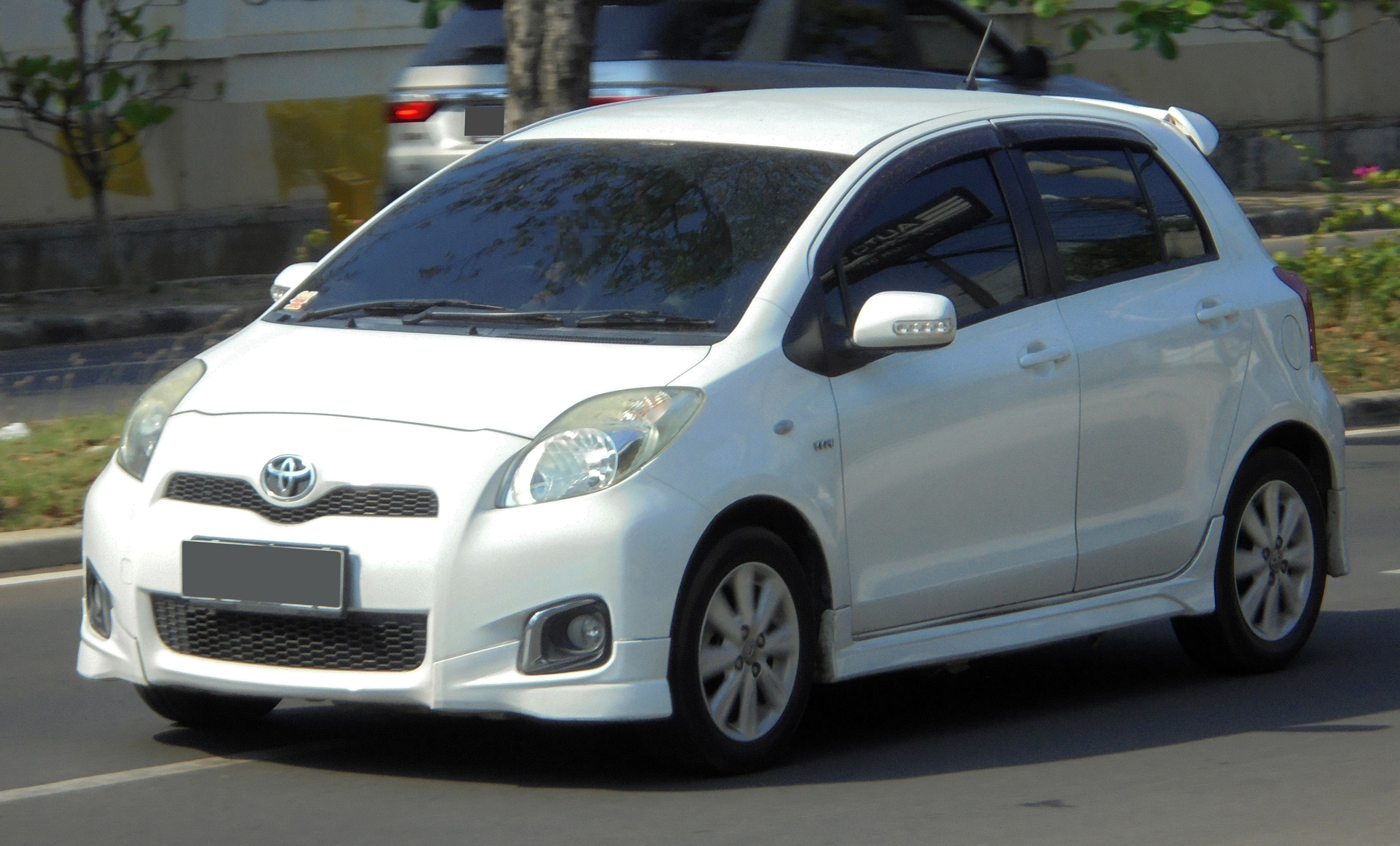
Second facelift (Indonesia)

=== Daihatsu Charade ===
From 2011 to 2013, Daihatsu sold the five-door XP90 Yaris in Europe as the Daihatsu Charade. Built in France from April 2011, powertrains comprised a 1.3-litre engine and six-speed manual or optional automatic. The Charade was sold alongside the XP130 series Toyota Yaris.

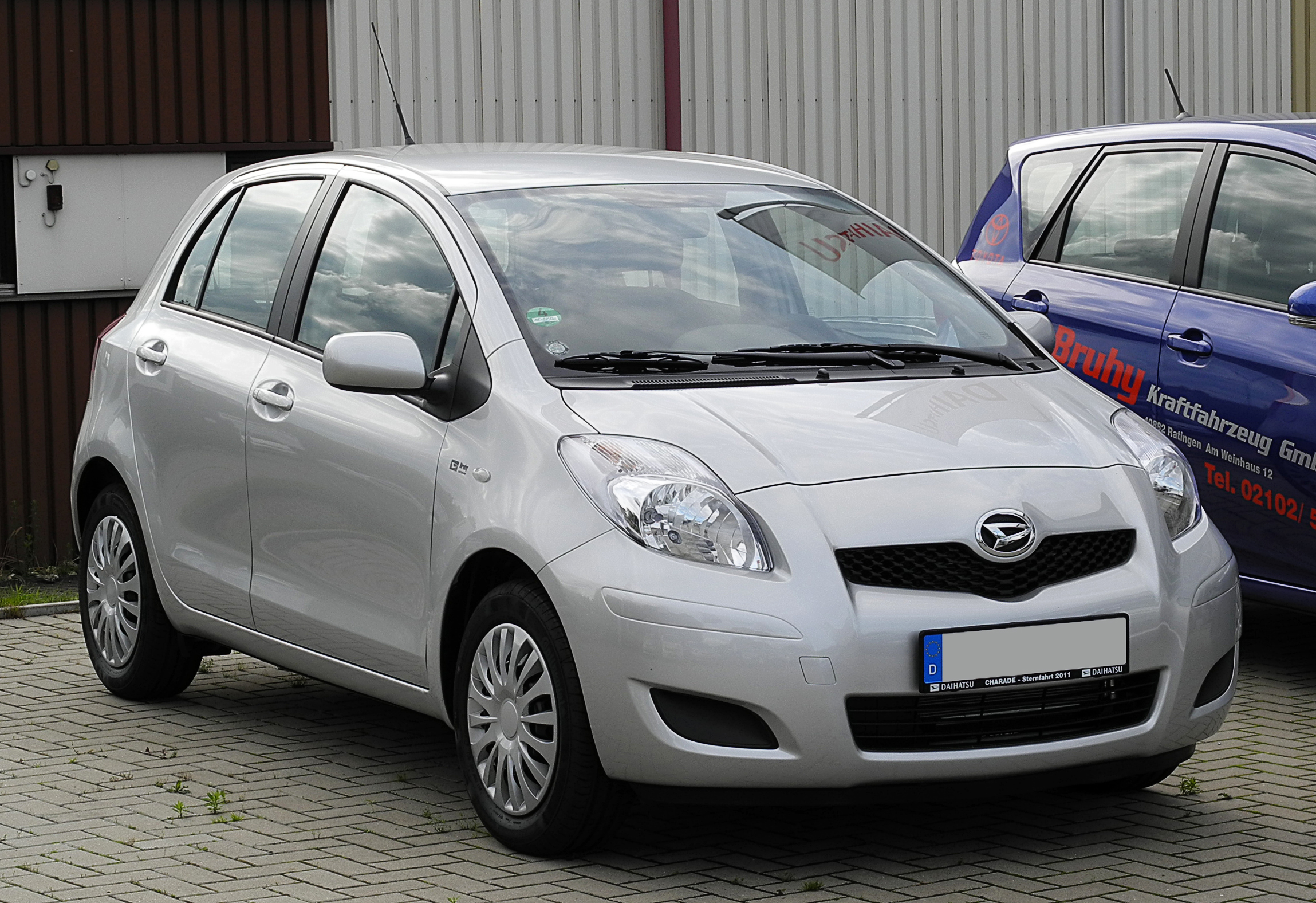
Daihatsu Charade

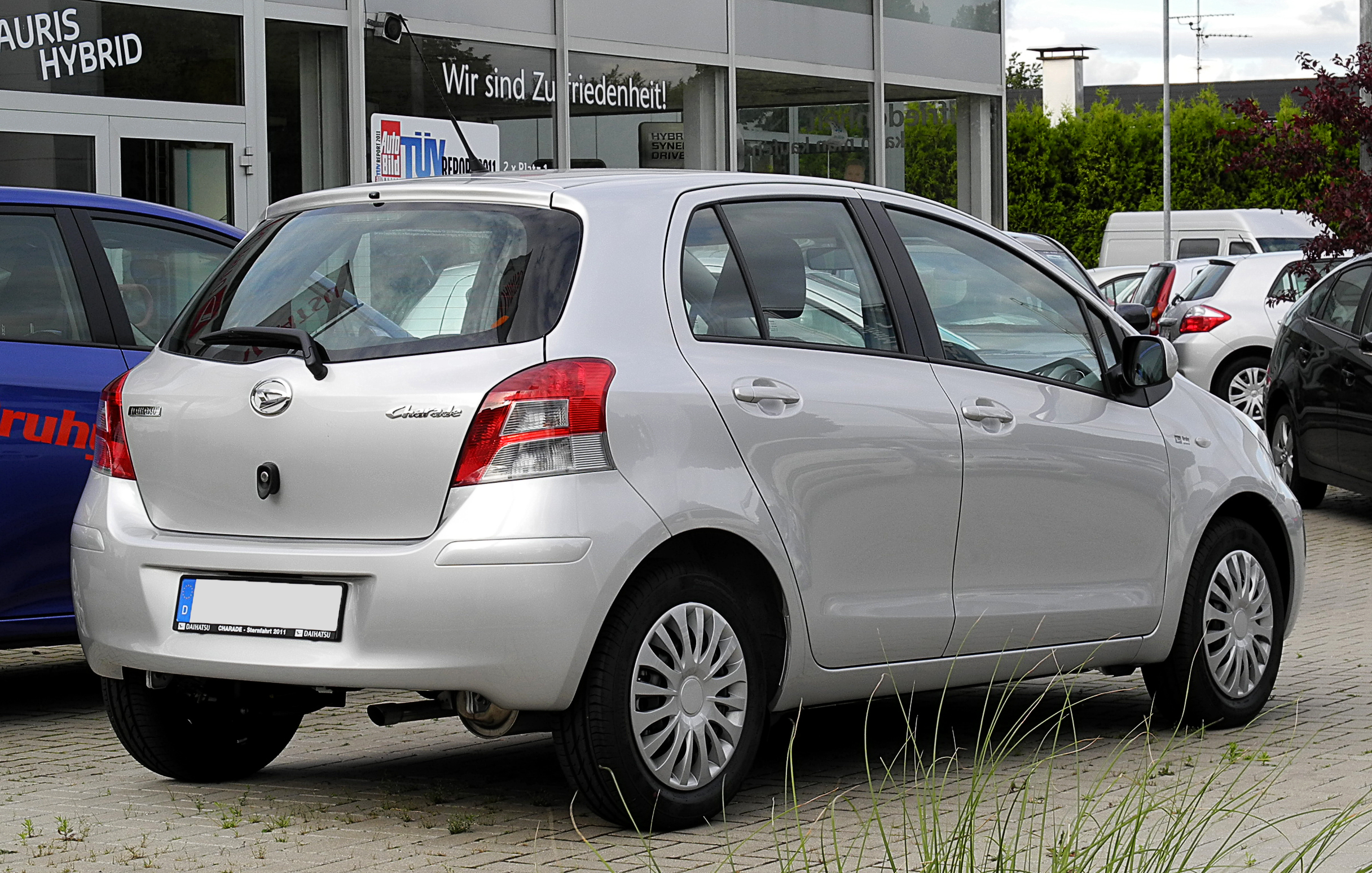
Daihatsu Charade

=== Vitz RS ===
The Vitz RS was launched in 2005. It is powered 1.5 L 4-cylinder VVT-i engine rated 107 bhp (80 kW) and 140 N⋅m (103 lbf⋅ft). The RS features 16-inch alloy wheels, an RS badged mesh grille, a redesigned front and rear bumper, redesigned tail lamps, deep side skirts and a tail spoiler. It also features sports tuned steering and suspension as well as disc rear brakes.

The Vitz RS was sold in North American market equipped with the base 1.5-litre engine, and in European markets as the Yaris TS. It was first seen at the 2007 Geneva Motor Show. As with the previous T-Sport, there are extra rear reflectors on the bumper. Essentially, it is a Japanese market Vitz RS fitted with a 1.8-litre 2ZR-FE engine rated 130 hp (97 kW) and 173 N⋅m (128 lb⋅ft), which can reach 100 km/h (62 mph) in under 10 seconds.

For model year 2007 on Japanese models only, G-BOOK, a subscription telematics service, was offered as an option.

The Vitz RS was also a basis for the 2012 Thai-built Yaris facelift.

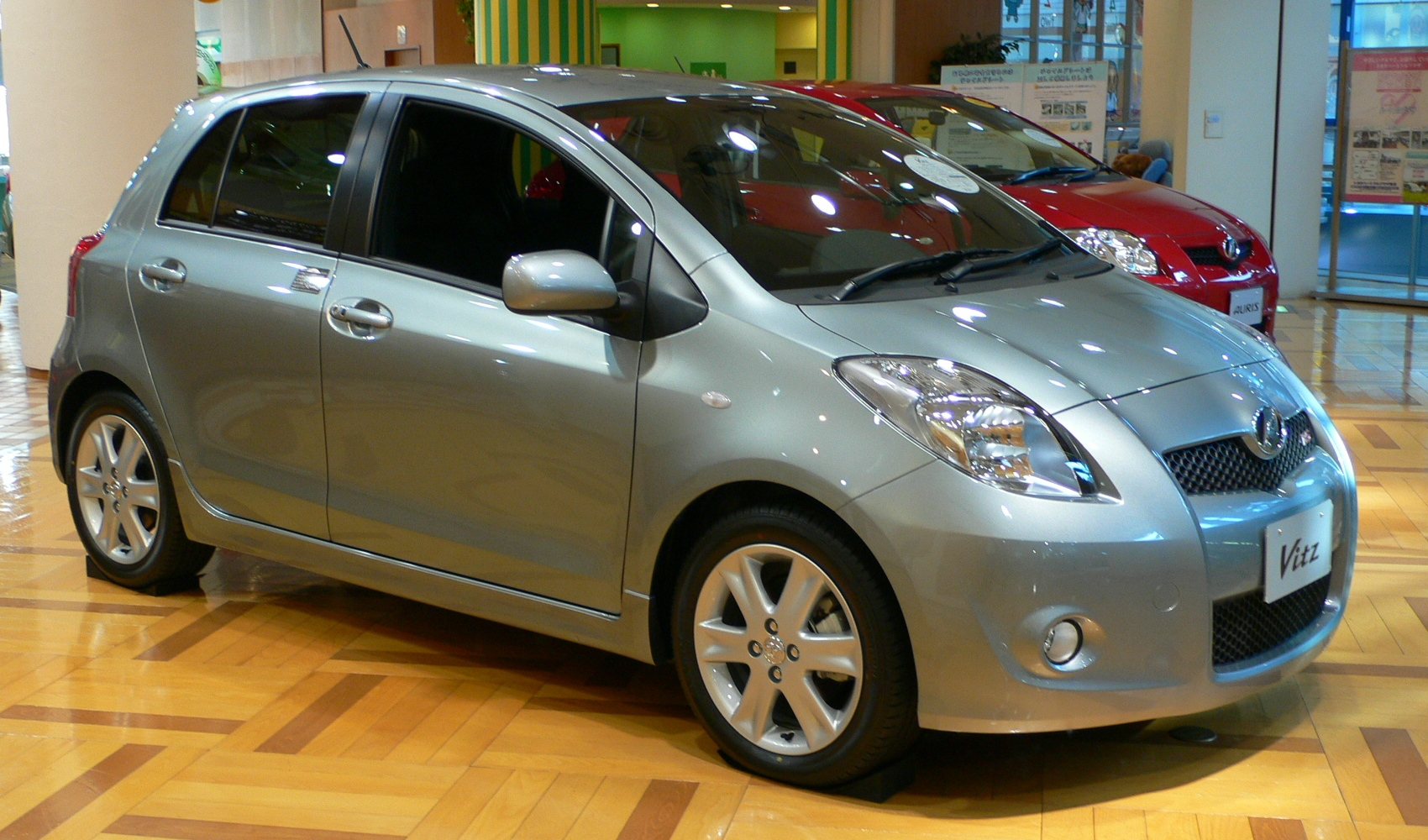
Pre-facelift: Vitz RS (Japan)

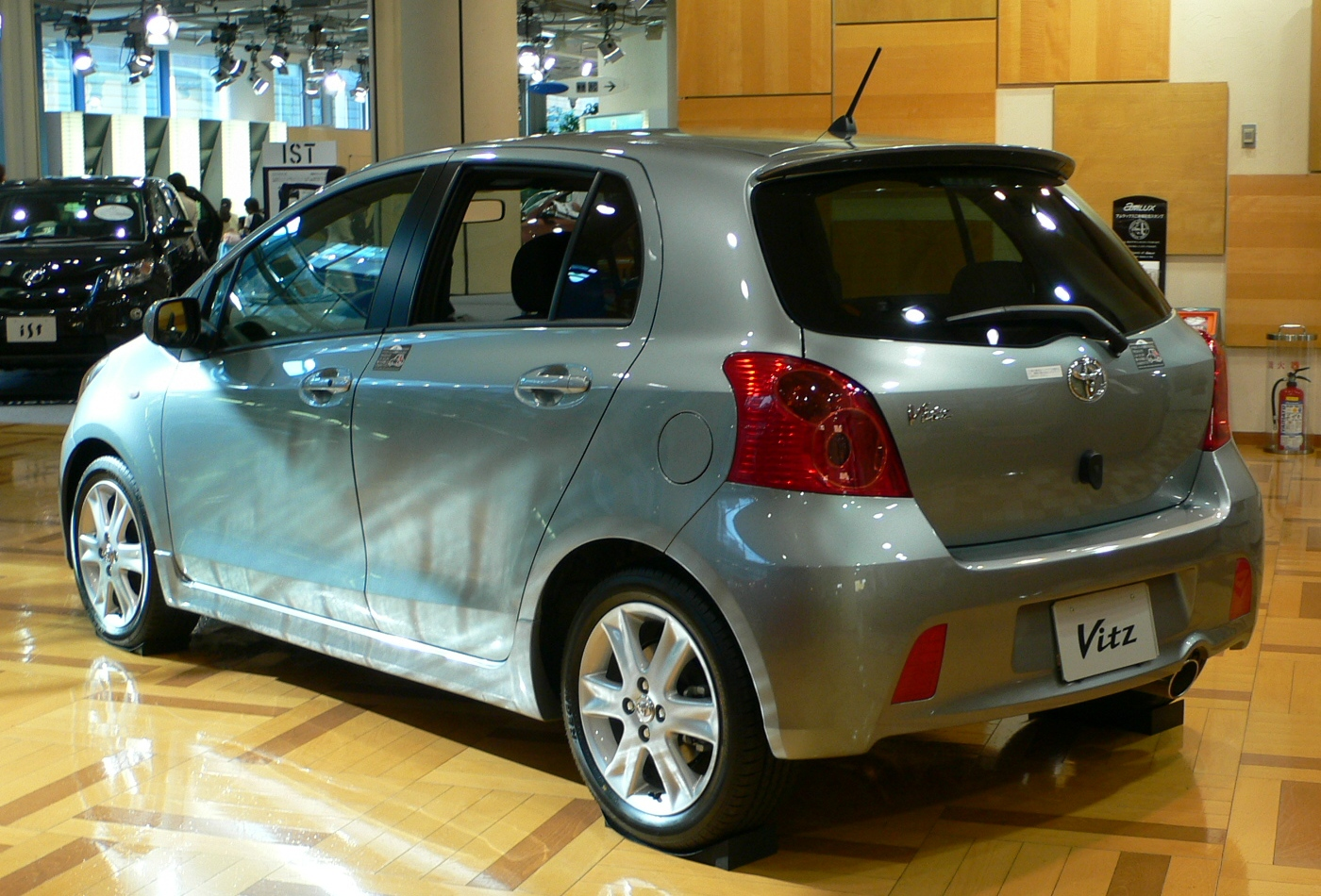
Pre-facelift: Vitz RS (Japan)

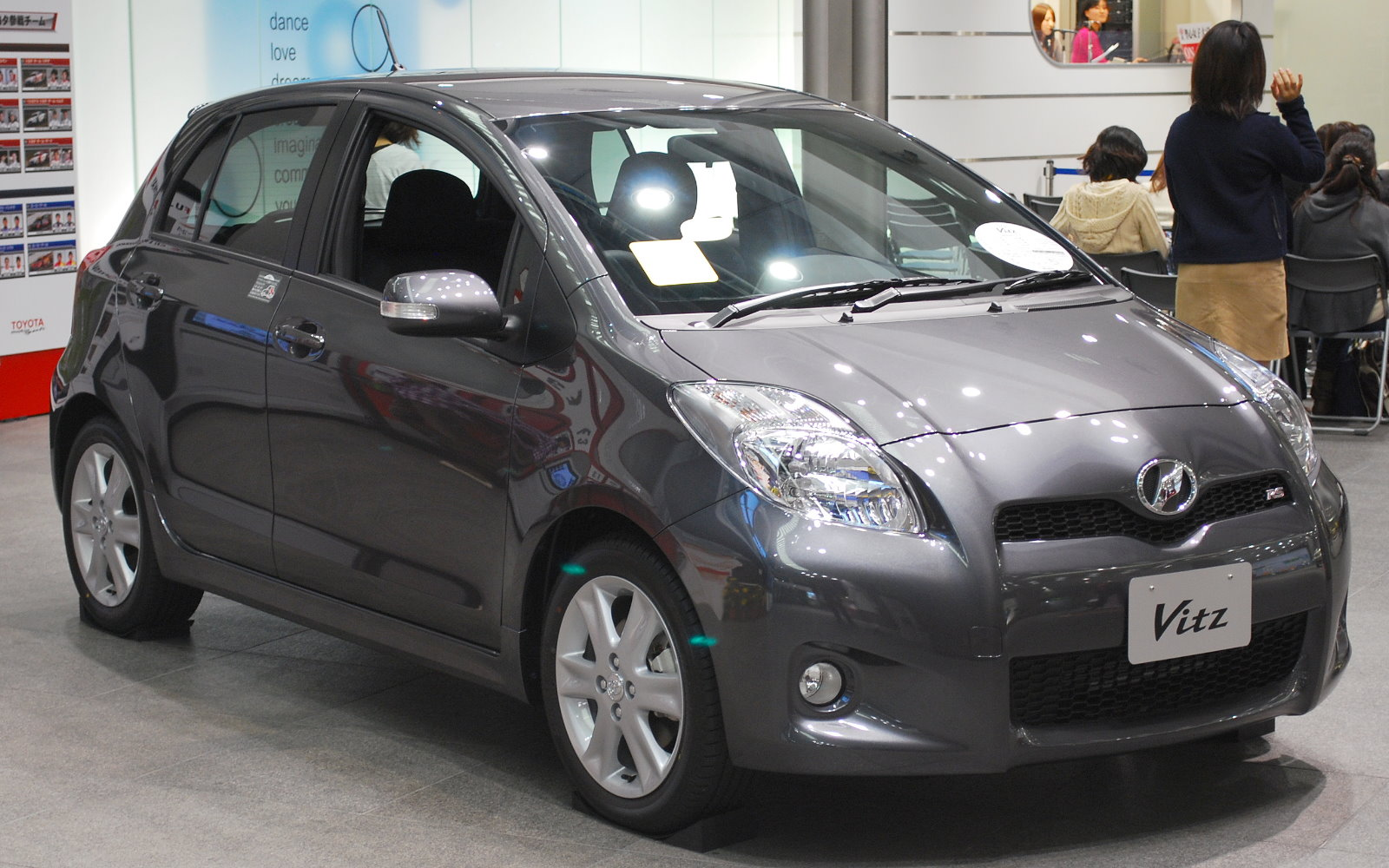
Facelift: Vitz RS (Japan)

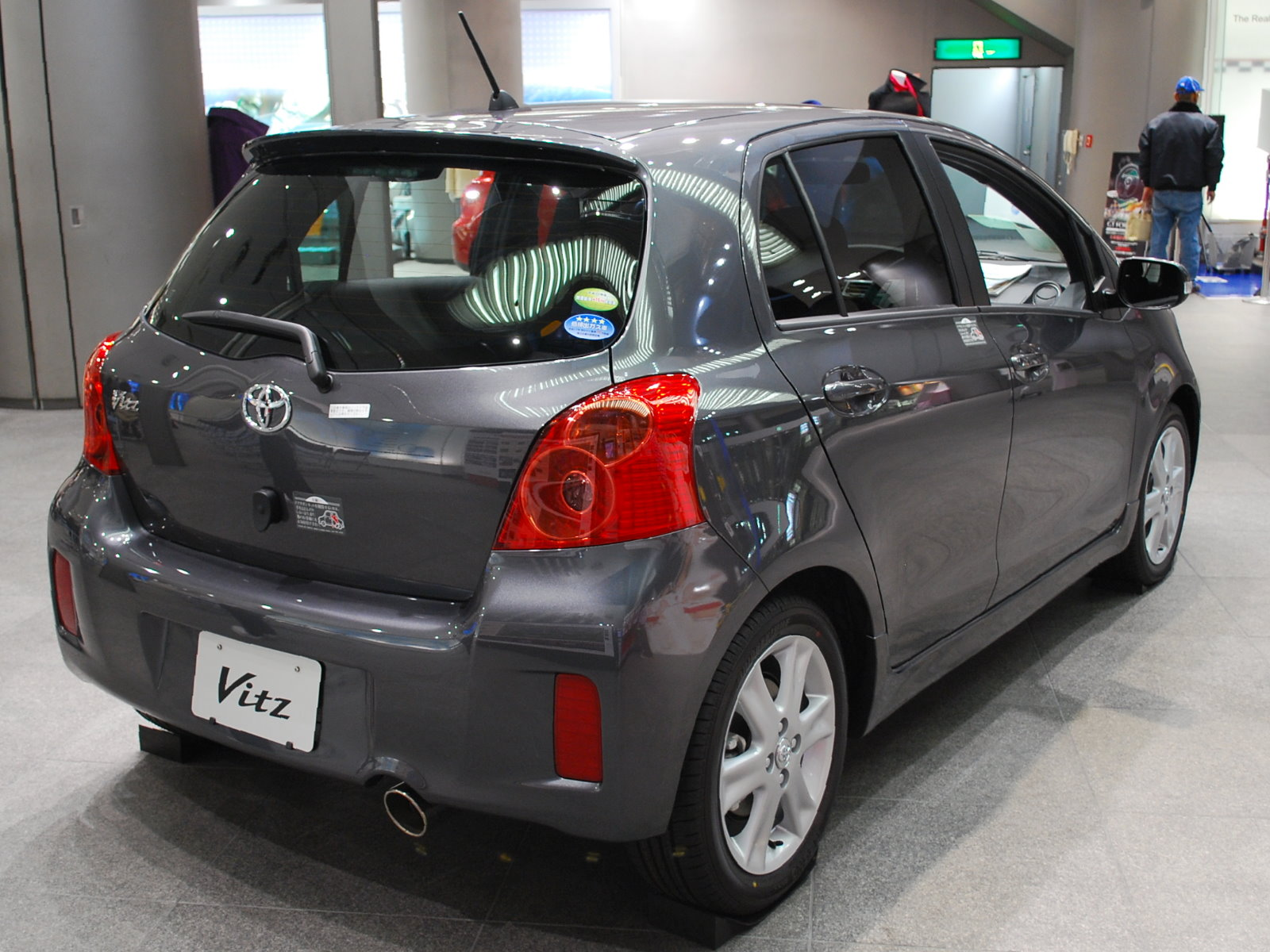
Facelift: Vitz RS (Japan)

=== Safety ===
Euro NCAP test results* Toyota Yaris 5-door (2005)
Test	Score	Rating
Adult occupant:	35	5 /5 stars
Child occupant:	34	3 /5 stars
Pedestrian:	18	2 /4 stars

U.S. NHTSA crash test ratings (5-door)
Frontal Driver:	4/5 stars
Frontal Passenger:	4/5 stars
Side Driver (side airbags):	4/5 stars
Side Rear Passenger (side airbags):	4/5 stars
Rollover:	4/5 stars

U.S. NHTSA crash test ratings (3-door)
Frontal Driver:	5/5 stars
Frontal Passenger:	4/5 stars
Side Driver (no side airbags):	3/5 stars
Side Driver (side airbags):	5/5 stars
Side Rear Passenger (with or without side airbag):	3/5 stars
Rollover:	4/5 stars

ANCAP test results* Toyota Yaris 3 door hatch with dual frontal airbags (2005)
Test	Score
Overall	4 /5 stars
Frontal offset	13.38/16
Side impact	14.08/16
Pole	Not Assessed
Seat belt reminders	2/3
Whiplash protection	Not Assessed
Pedestrian protection	Marginal
Electronic stability control	Not Assessed

ANCAP test results* Toyota Yaris 5 door hatch with safety pack (2005)
Test	Score
Overall	4 /5 stars
Frontal offset	15.20/16
Side impact	15.75/16
Pole	2/2
Seat belt reminders	2/3
Whiplash protection	Not Assessed
Pedestrian protection	Marginal
Electronic stability control	Not Assessed

=== Markets ===
==== Asia ====
===== Japan =====
In Japan, the second generation model is sold as the Vitz. It is available in B, F, I and RS model grades. Engine available ranges from 1 to 1.5-litres starting with the basic B variant to the sporty RS variant featuring a sports package and minor cosmetic bits on its interior and minor tweaks to its suspension. The models which have automatic transmission adopt a 4WD layout while the manual version use a standard front 2WD layout.

In September 2008, Toyota Modellista International launched three special editions of the Vitz RS with a number of cosmetic and TRD performance parts for the Japanese market. These models were known as "Vitz TRD Racing", "Vitz TRD Sport M" and turbocharged "Vitz TRD Turbo M". Available for sale through Toyota Netz Store dealerships, same as the regular Vitz.

===== China =====
The Yaris has been built and marketed in China by GAC Toyota since July 2008. Two engine options have been provided: the 1.3-litre 2NZ-FE and 1.6-litre dual VVT-i 4ZR-FE. To boost sales, GAC-Toyota developed a 2011 model specifically for the Chinese market. The XP90 continued to be built in China until it was replaced by the newer model in November 2013. However, extended production continued from 2015 to 2016 under Chinese electric car sub brand Leahead which was owned by GAC Toyota. The Leahead i1 has received criticism for faulty airbags.

===== Indonesia =====
The Yaris was launched in Indonesia on 10 February 2006. It is powered by the 1.5-litre 1NZ-FE engine matched to 4-speed Super ECT automatic or 5-speed manual transmission. Initially, the Yaris was offered in E, S and S Limited trim levels. Imported from Thailand. The automatic only S and S Limited came with front, side and rear spoilers. Engine Start/Stop button is for the S Limited only.

At 14th Indonesia International Motor Show, the Superman Edition was released. Based on E trim, features a Superman "S Shield" logo on the hood, then on the side there is a picture of Superman decals on the car door. It was offered in small quantities of around 50 units

In June 2007, the E Limited trim was added with aero mudguards, rear spoiler and a grille with similar look with the Vios as differences with the standard E trim. The new base model J was added into the lineup in 2008. Limited edition TRD Sportivo model were added, based from J trim with body kit and lowered springs, only 10 units were made.

The Yaris received its facelift on 16 March 2009 with new bumpers, grille, tail lights and revised interior. The mid-level E got aero-style mudguards and roof spoiler, while full body kits are remained on the S and S Limited, The Yaris facelift still retains the 1NZ-FE engine. The second TRD Sportivo model based from S Limited trim with extreme body kit and lowered springs was offered in small numbers in 2010.

The Yaris received a facelift again on 14 March 2012 with the Vitz RS look but with fog lamp covers, body kit and spoiler, updated steering wheel on E, S and TRD Sportivo type, and new interior with red stitching on S and TRD Sportivo types. The S Limited type was renamed to S A/T and the TRD Sportivo variant added manual transmission (previously available in automatic transmission only), a body kit, and no longer used TRD suspension to reduce cost. Sales terminated in October 2013 when production in Thailand was replaced by the XP150 model. In other uses, Toyota Team Indonesia built a slightly modified Yaris based on the TRD Sportivo model and is used for races in the Indonesian Touring Car Championship.

===== Malaysia =====
The Yaris was also available in Malaysia in May 2006, powered by the 1NZ-FE engine with 4-cylinder DOHC with VVT-i. It comes in 2 trim levels: 1.5 G and 1.5 S, both with 4-speed automatic transmission with Super ECT and Gate Shifter, featuring an output of 80 kW (109 PS; 107 hp) at 6000 rpm, and a torque of 141 N⋅m (104 lb⋅ft) at 4200 rpm. The 1.5 S trim comes with 15" solid disc brakes for the front wheels, front and rear bumper spoilers, side skirt and rear roof mounted spoiler, amber Optitron meter, a black center cluster, leather wrapped gearshift.

===== Singapore =====
The Yaris was first launched in Singapore in 2006 by the local dealer Borneo Motors with 3 variants, namely the E (Manual and Automatic) and G (Automatic). It is powered by a 1NZ-FE 4-cylinder DOHC engine with VVT-i. The G model has a 60:40 split rear seat, an additional tray under the driver's seat and side door mouldings which the E model does not. It features an Optitron speedometer across the lineup. Optional body kits are also available featuring a front and rear lip, side skirts and a rear roof mounted spoiler. After its facelift in 2010, the 1.5 E automatic was the only variant available.

===== Thailand =====
In Thailand, which manufactured the Yaris for the Asian market, was available in 4 trim levels namely the J, E, G and RS. The Yaris is powered by a 1.5 L 1NZ-FE powerplant in Thailand. The RS model features a RS emblem sport grille, red stitching on the steering wheel, 16-inch alloy wheels, sport suspension and blackened headlamp tint. It also features Smart Entry and Push Start ignition. Both the G and RS trim has multifunction controls on the steering wheel.

==== Australia ====
In Australia, the Yaris is available in hatchback and sedan forms. It comes with either a 1.3-litre (2NZ-FE) or 1.5-litre (1NZ-FE) powered petrol engine. Models sold are the basic 1.3 YR with 14" steel wheels; the mid-range 1.5 YRS with 15" steel wheels and a leather bound steering wheel and gearshift knob; and the sportier 1.5 YRX which features front fog lights, a bodykit consisting of front lip, side skirts and a rear spoiler, and 15" alloy wheels. The "Rush" model was a base 1.3 YR with front fog lights and alloy wheels from the YRX. All Australian delivered models have ventilated front discs and rear drums. Across the model lineup, a seven airbag package is available as part of the Enhanced Safety Pack option.

==== North America ====
The second generation US Yaris is the successor to the previous North American Toyota Echo. In the US, the 3-door Vitz shares the Yaris name with the Toyota Belta sedan. The 3-door model is called the 'Yaris Liftback', while the 5-door model would be sold starting with the 2009 model year and competes with the similarly equipped Scion xD. The 2008 model year US Yaris comes standard with the 1.5-litre VVT-i engine producing 106 hp (79 kW) and 103 lb⋅ft (140 N⋅m) and five-speed manual transmission C54, the four-speed automatic U340E being optional. Fuel economy is rated at 29 mpg_{‑US} (8.1 L/100 km; 35 mpg_{‑imp}) in the city and 36 mpg_{‑US} (6.5 L/100 km; 43 mpg_{‑imp}) on the highway with the manual transmission. While front airbags are standard, as mandated by the law, ABS and side airbags are available only as an option. In some southern states, a special Yaris Onyx was released in January 2009 that added 17-inch wheels and a number of cosmetic items.

The Canadian Yaris hatchback was available in 3 and 5-door models and is similar to the US variant, running on the Toyota NZ engine, a 1.5 L 4-cylinder VVT-i engine rated 106 bhp (79 kW) and 103 lb⋅ft (140 N⋅m). The 2006 Yaris with the 1.5-litre engine can achieve fuel economy ratings of 40 miles per US gallon (5.9 L/100 km; 48 mpg_{‑imp}) during highway driving and 34 mpg_{‑US} (6.9 L/100 km; 41 mpg_{‑imp}) during city driving. 3-door CE and 5-door LE versions come with 14-inch wheels, while RS models are equipped with 15-inch alloys with standard anti-lock braking system (ABS) and electronic brakeforce distribution (EBD). In addition, 2008 RS models include new front and rear skirts. The CE, LE, and RS packages were replaced by the more modular convenience, power, and all-weather guard packages.

For the 2009 year, the Yaris 5-door liftbacks join the lineup of the existing 4-door sedans and 3-door liftbacks because of the increased demand for fuel efficient subcompact cars. In addition to the new 5-door liftback, all 2009 Yaris models come standard with anti-lock brakes (ABS), front seat-mounted side airbags and front and rear curtain side airbags. For 2009, Toyota also added cruise control as an option on liftback models, and has added a few more colour choices.

The Yaris has been praised by the automotive press for its extremely high fuel economy, but criticized for its excessive body roll (due to a soft suspension and high ride height) and the initial lack of a manual transmission on 5-door models.

The 2010 model has a 5-speed manual option for the 5-door. It also has the Star Safety System – Vehicle Stability Control (VSC) + Traction Control (TRAC), Anti-lock Brake System (ABS) with Electronic Brake-force Distribution (EBD) and Brake Assist.

=== Recall ===
In January 2009, Toyota recalled 1.28 million vehicles worldwide based on the Yaris platform, such as the Vitz, Belta and the Ractis. The recall is based on a seat belt defect that, in severe front-end collisions, could cause a foam pad in the vehicle to ignite.

== Third generation (XP130; 2010) ==
Third generation (XP130)
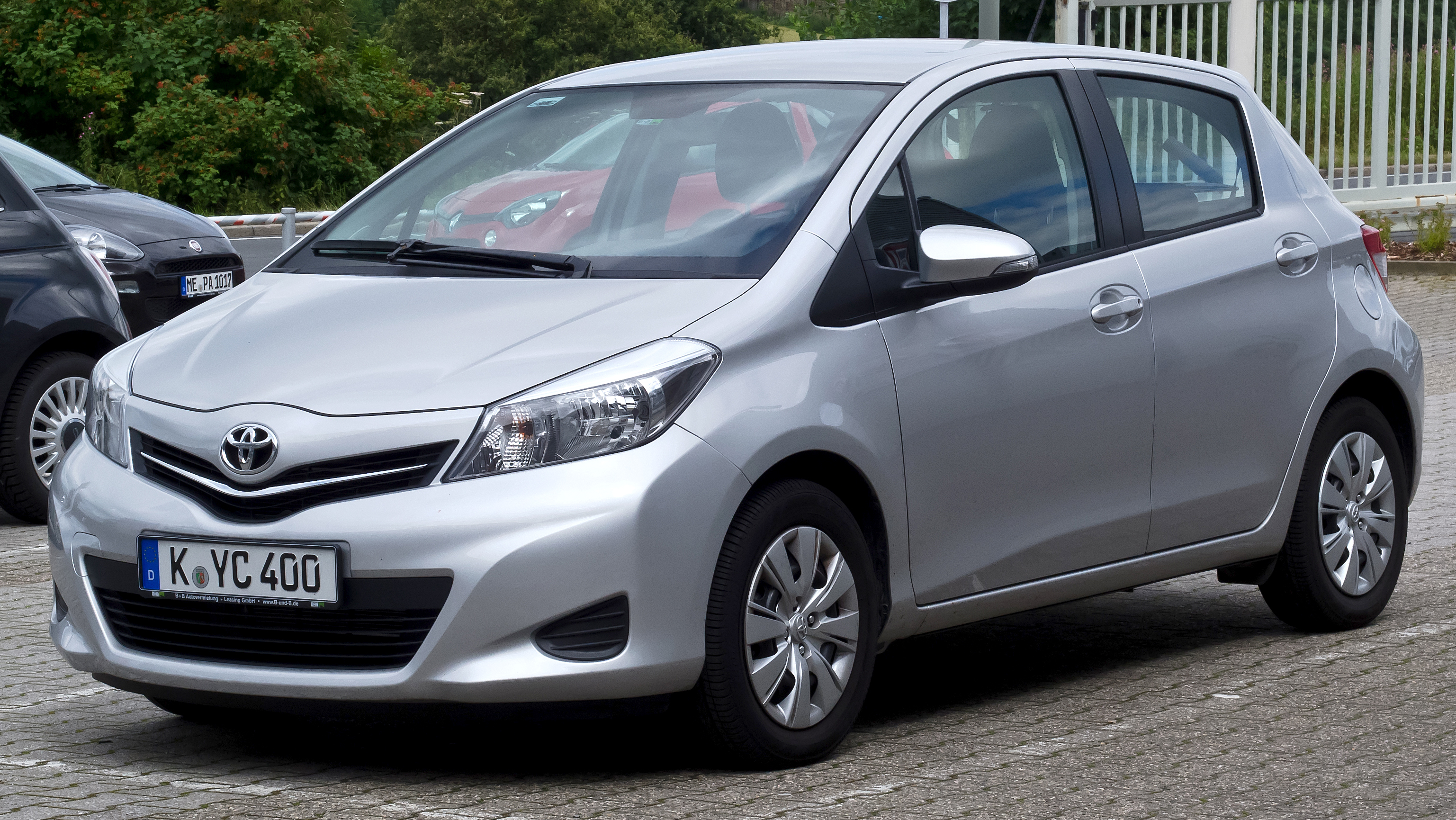
- Toyota Yaris (pre-facelift, Europe)

Overview
- Also called: Toyota Yaris
- Production: December 2010 – December 2019 (Japan); June 2011 – June 2020 (France)
- Model years: 2012–2019
- Assembly: Japan: Kanegasaki, Iwate (Toyota Motor East Japan); Ōbu, Aichi (Toyota Industries) (Japan); France: Onnaing (Toyota Motor Manufacturing France, N. America, Europe, Turkey, Australia)
- Designer: Yahiko Kumai and Tokiko Gamou (2008)

Body and chassis
- Platform: Toyota B platform
- Related: Toyota Prius c/Aqua (NHP10); Toyota Ractis (XP120); Toyota Sienta (XP170)

Powertrain
- Engine: Petrol: 1.0 L 1KR-FE I3 (KSP130); 1.3 L 2NZ-FE I4 (Australia/New Zealand; NCP130); 1.3 L 1NR-FE I4 (NSP130/135); 1.3 L 1NR-FKE I4 (NSP130/135); 1.5 L 1NZ-FE I4 (NCP131); 1.5 L 1NZ-FTE I4-T (GRMN Turbo; NCP131); 1.5 L 2NR-FKE I4 (Europe); 1.8 L 2ZR-FE I4-S (GRMN; NSP131); Petrol hybrid: 1.5 L 1NZ-FXE I4 (Hybrid NHP130); Diesel: 1.4 L 1ND-TV I4-T (Europe; NLP131)
- Power output: 156 kW (209 hp; 212 PS) (GRMN)
- Transmission: 5-speed manual; 6-speed manual; 4-speed automatic; CVT (Japan only); eCVT (hybrid, Europe)

Dimensions
- Wheelbase: 2,510 mm (98.8 in)
- Length: 2010–2016: 3,885–3,930 mm (153.0–154.7 in); 2017–2019: 3,945 mm (155.3 in) (including 2013 GRMN Turbo); 3,975 mm (156.5 in) (GR/GRMN); 3,980 mm (156.7 in) (RS G's)
- Width: 1,695 mm (66.7 in)
- Height: 1,490 mm (58.7 in) (GR/GRMN Turbo/RS G's); 1,500 mm (59.1 in) (FWD); 1,510 mm (59.4 in) (GRMN); 1,530 mm (60.2 in) (4WD)
- Curb weight: 970–1,130 kg (2,138–2,491 lb); 1,070 kg (2,359 lb) (GRMN Turbo); 1,140 kg (2,513 lb) (GRMN)

Chronology
- Successor: Toyota Yaris (XP150) (South Africa); Toyota GR Yaris (GR and GRMN models)

The third generation Vitz was introduced in December 2010 featuring a redesigned front fascia, roomier interior, single windshield wiper and instrument cluster relocated in front of the driver. In European countries, the Yaris was also offered in 6-speed manual transmission for the 1.33L engine, or a CVT transmission often marketed as "7-speed MultiDrive" or "MultiDrive S". The 7-speed refers to the possibility to select a predefined gear ratio among 7 available, emulating a 7-speed sequential gearbox, with steering wheel levers.

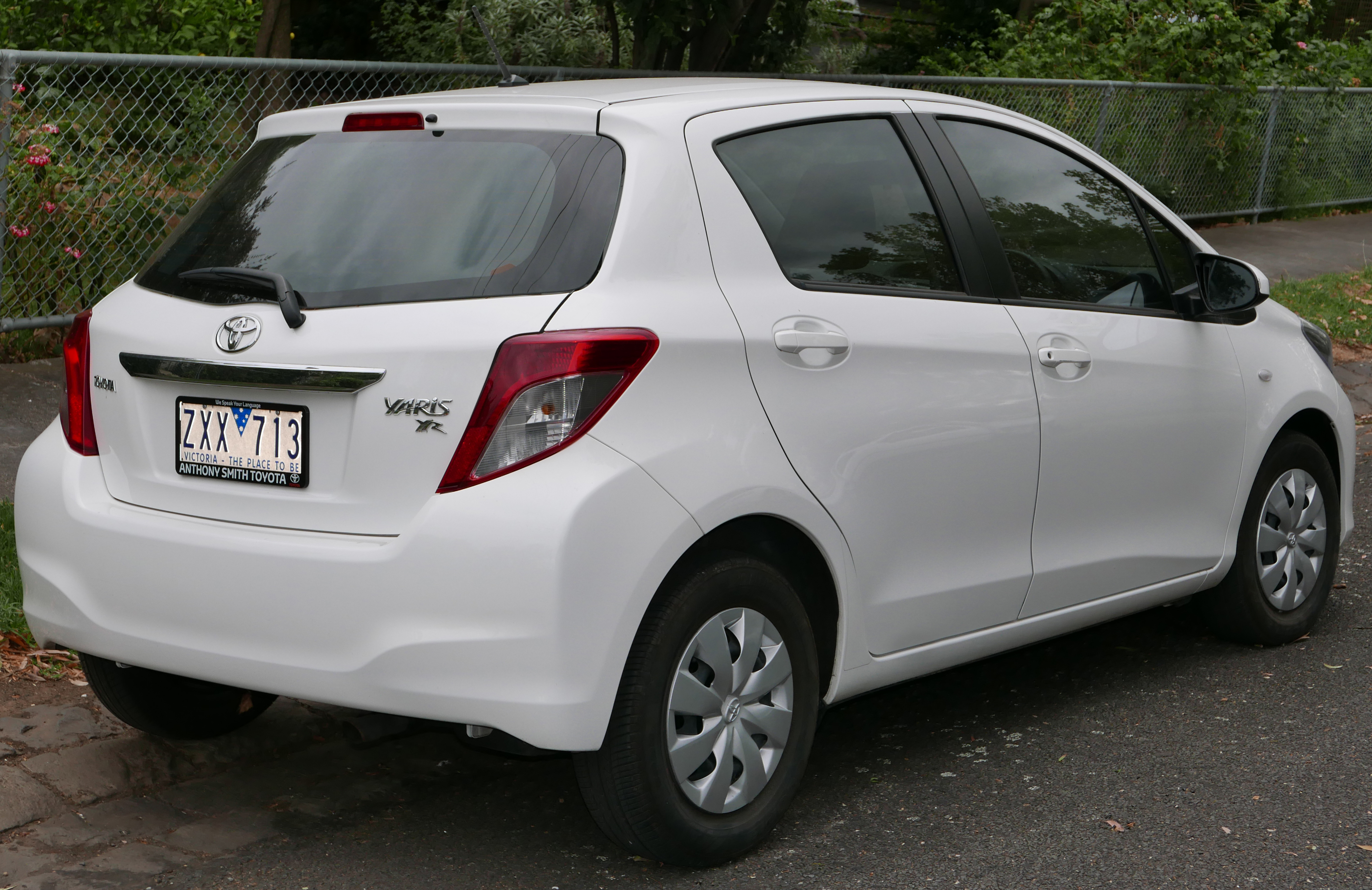
5-door (pre-facelift; Australia)

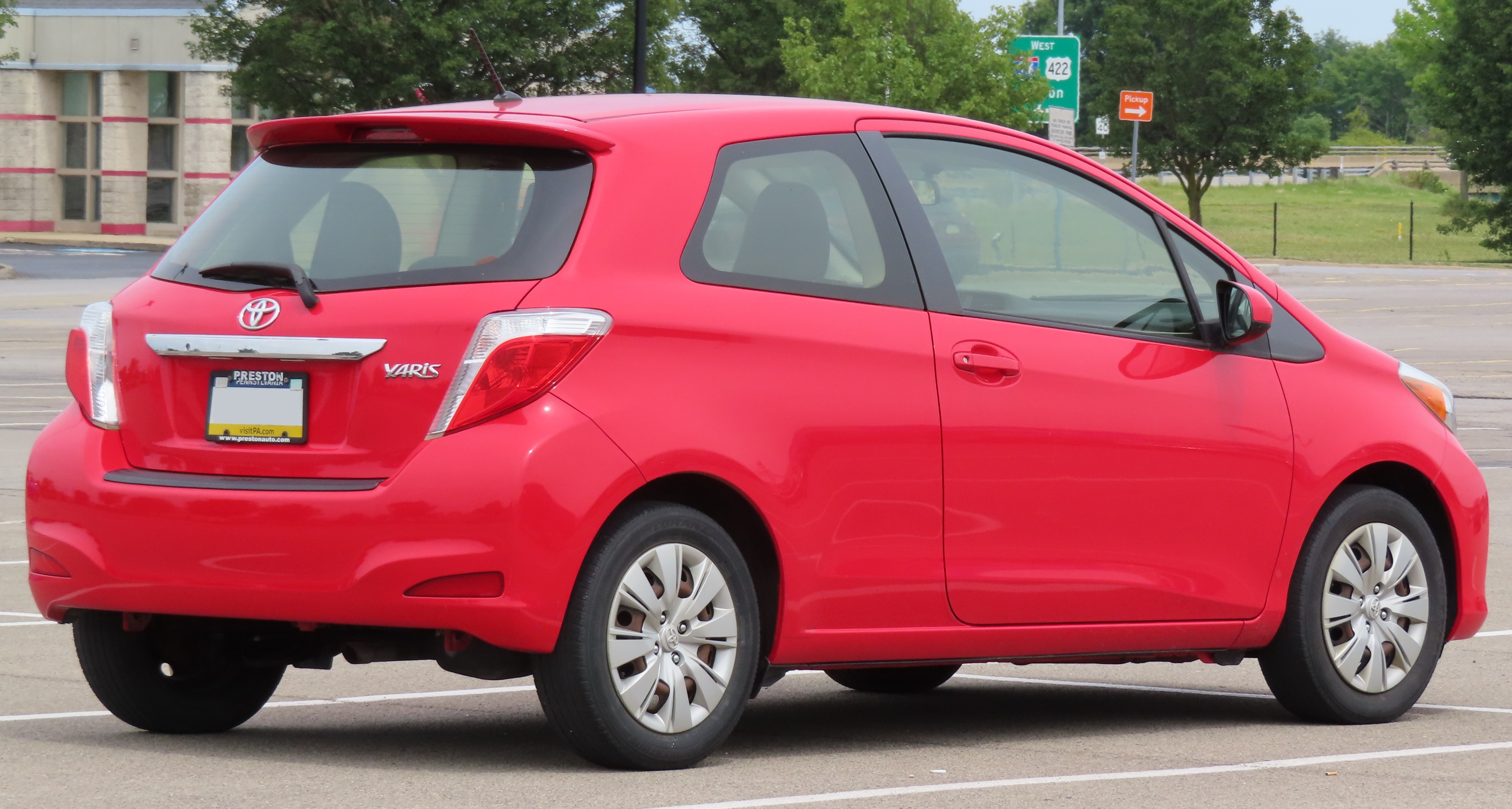
3-door (pre-facelift; US)

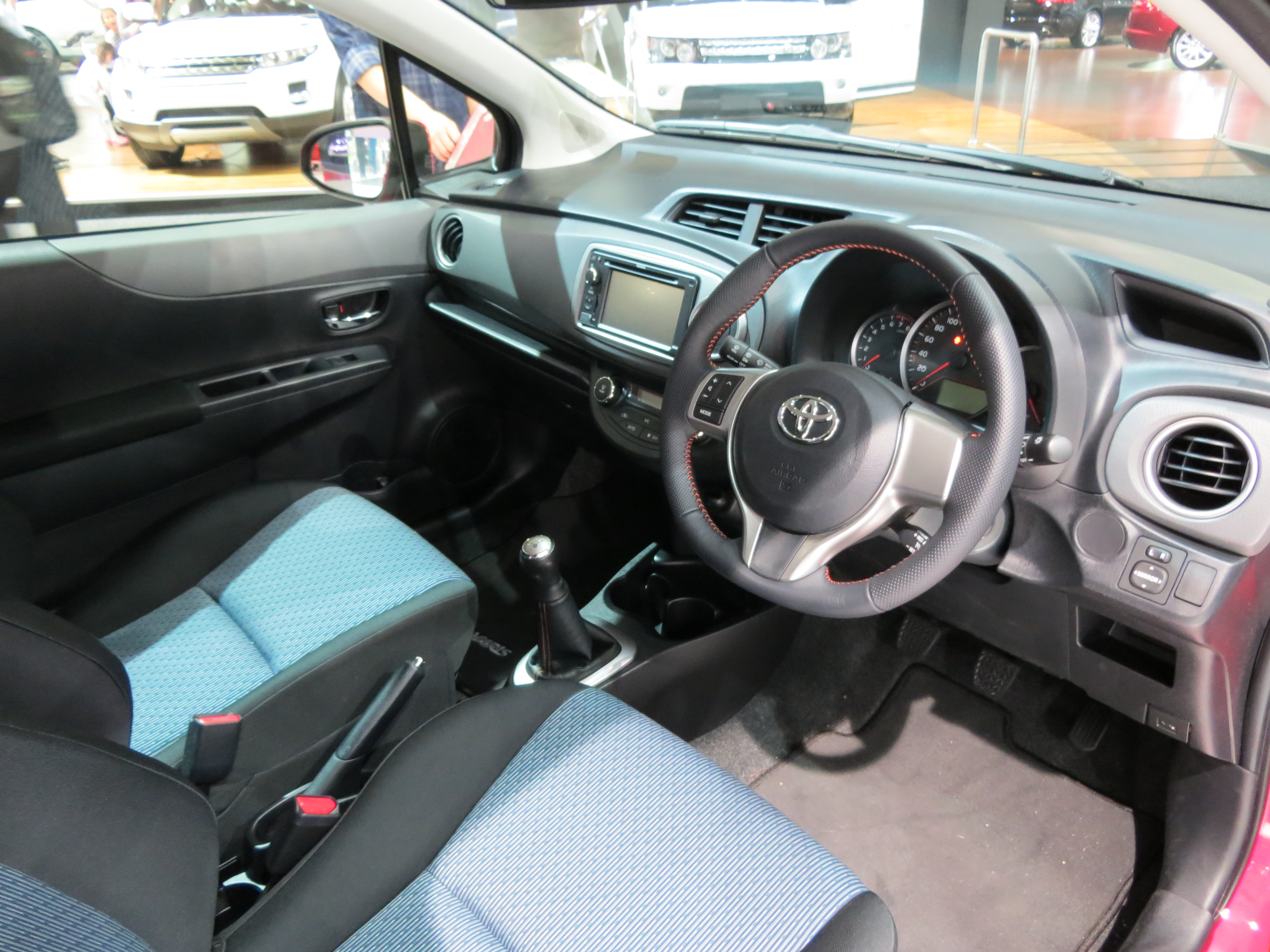
Interior (pre-facelift)

=== Safety ===
Euro NCAP test results* Toyota Yaris 5-door (2011)
Test	Points	%
Overall:	5 /5 stars	
Adult occupant:	32	89%
Child occupant:	40	81%
Pedestrian:	21	60%
Safety assist:	6	86%

ANCAP test results* Toyota Yaris all hatch variants (2011)
Test	Score
Overall	5 /5 stars
Frontal offset	15.41/16
Side impact	16/16
Pole	1/2
Seat belt reminders	2/3
Whiplash protection	Not Assessed
Pedestrian protection	Adequate
Electronic stability control	Standard

ANCAP test results* Toyota Yaris all hatch variants (2017)
Test	Score
Overall	5 /5 stars
Frontal offset	15.41/16
Side impact	16/16
Pole	1/2
Seat belt reminders	3/3
Whiplash protection	Good
Pedestrian protection	Adequate
Electronic stability control	Standard

=== Recall ===
On 10 October 2012, Toyota recalled 7.4 million vehicles worldwide, including certain Vitz, Yaris and Corolla models, due to malfunctioning power windows. They include: 2.47 million in the United States, 1.4 million in China and 1.39 million in Europe.

=== Facelift (2014) ===
In 2014, a facelift version was introduced and marketed in North America, Europe, Australia and Japan — the latter as the Vitz. North America and Australia models featured a 1.5-litre, 77 kW (103 hp) engine with a five-speed manual or a four-speed automatic. In Europe, it was offered with a 1.33-litre engine, coupled with a six-speed manual or a CVT automatic. The facelift was designed by Toyota Europe, where previous iterations had been designed in Japan.

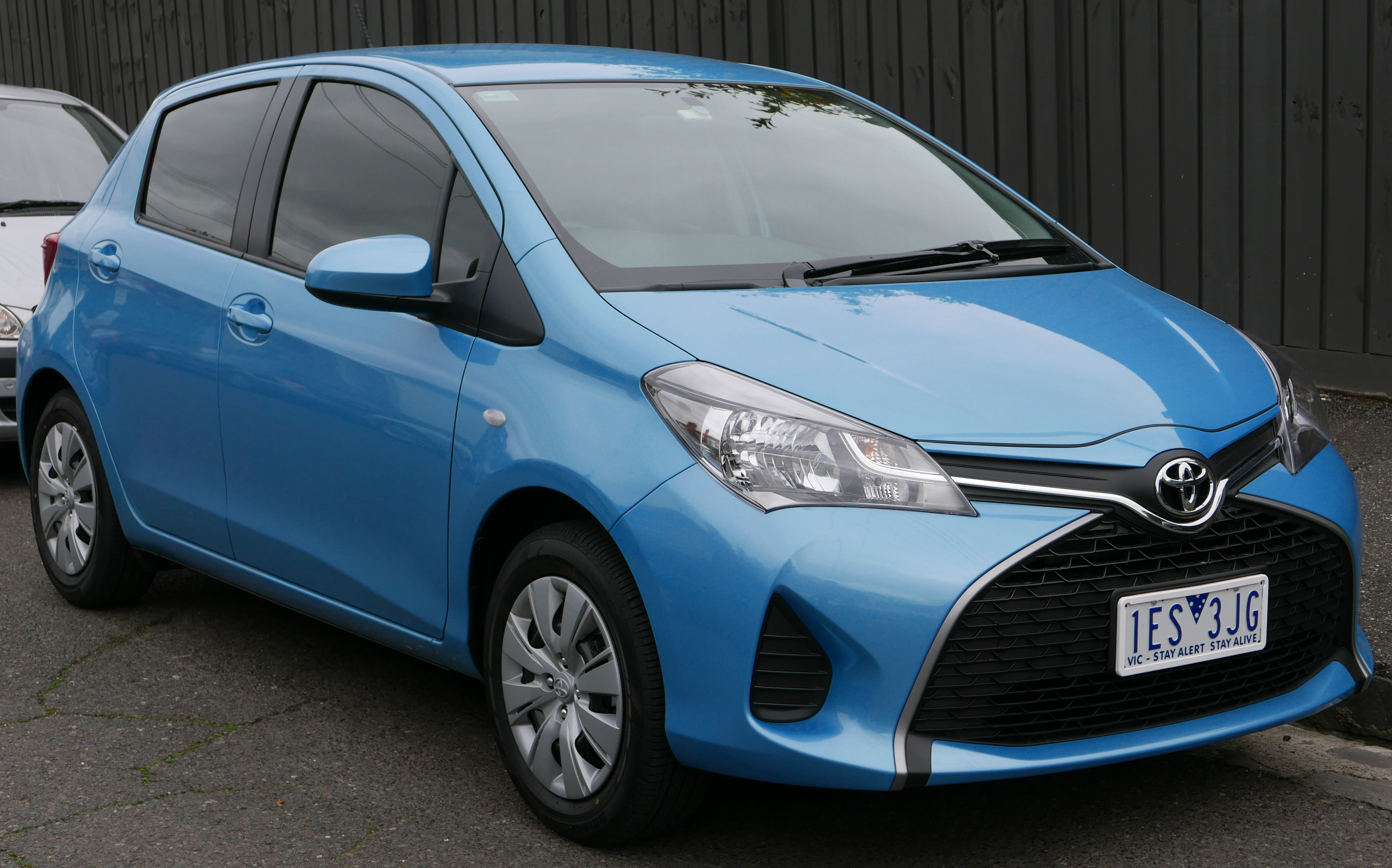
First facelift

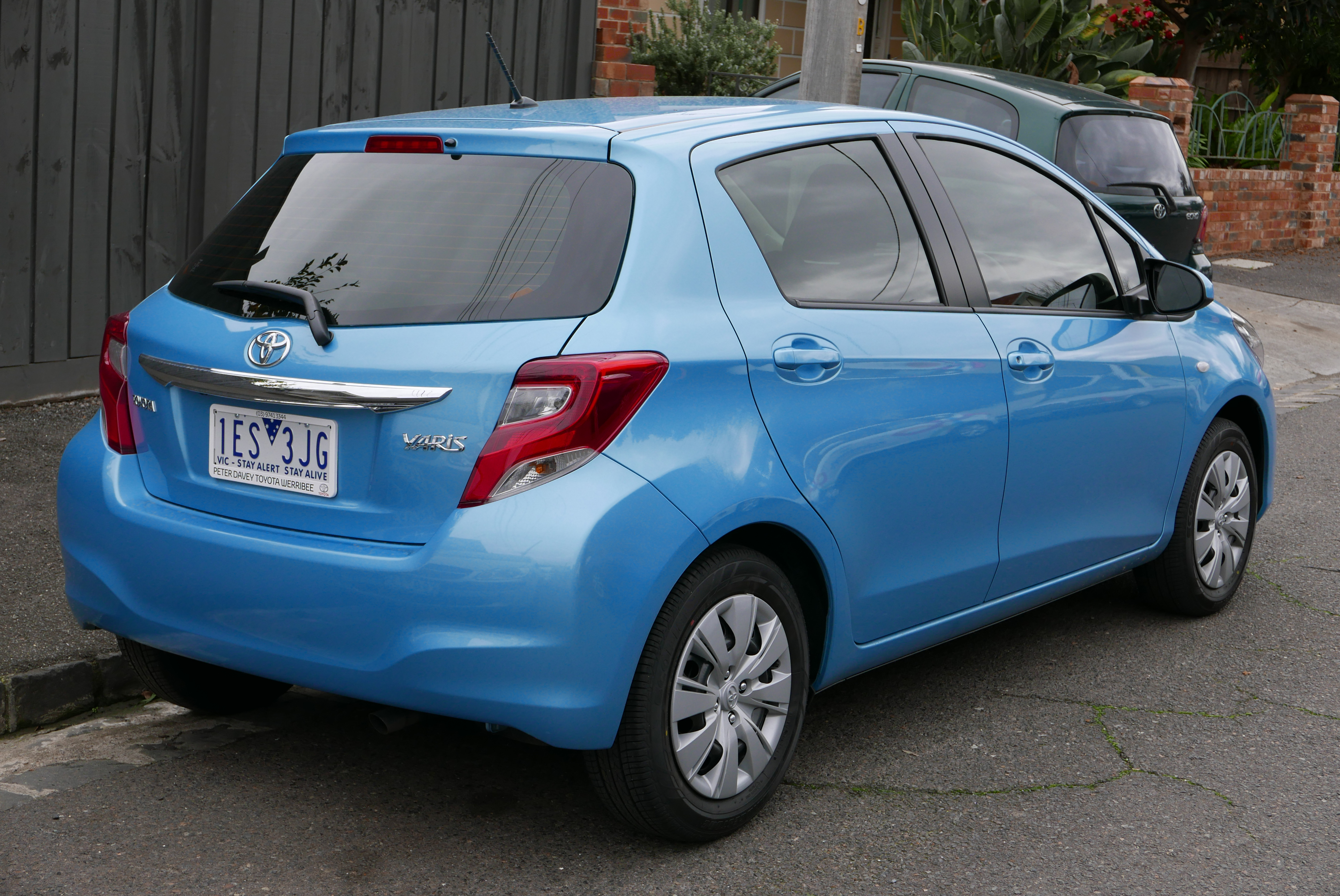
First facelift (Australia)

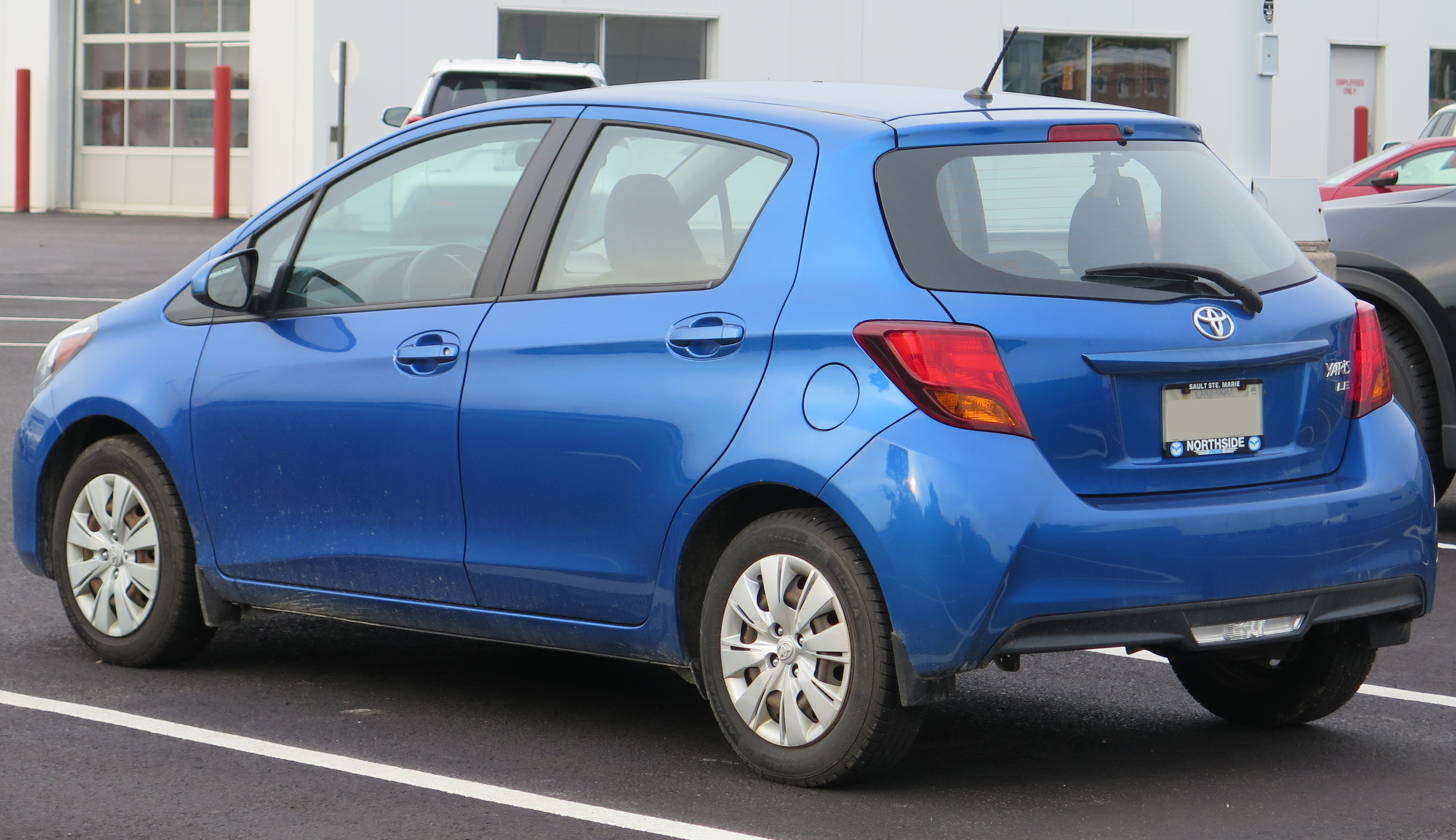
First facelift (North America)

=== Facelift (2017) ===
On 12 January 2017, a second facelift version of the Vitz was launched in Japan. It was also offered with a hybrid drivetrain. The second facelift version of the Yaris has been available in Europe and Australia since March 2017 and in South Africa and North America since June 2017. The North American version was revealed at the April 2017 New York International Auto Show. The South African models were later replaced by the facelifted XP150 series Yaris hatchback.

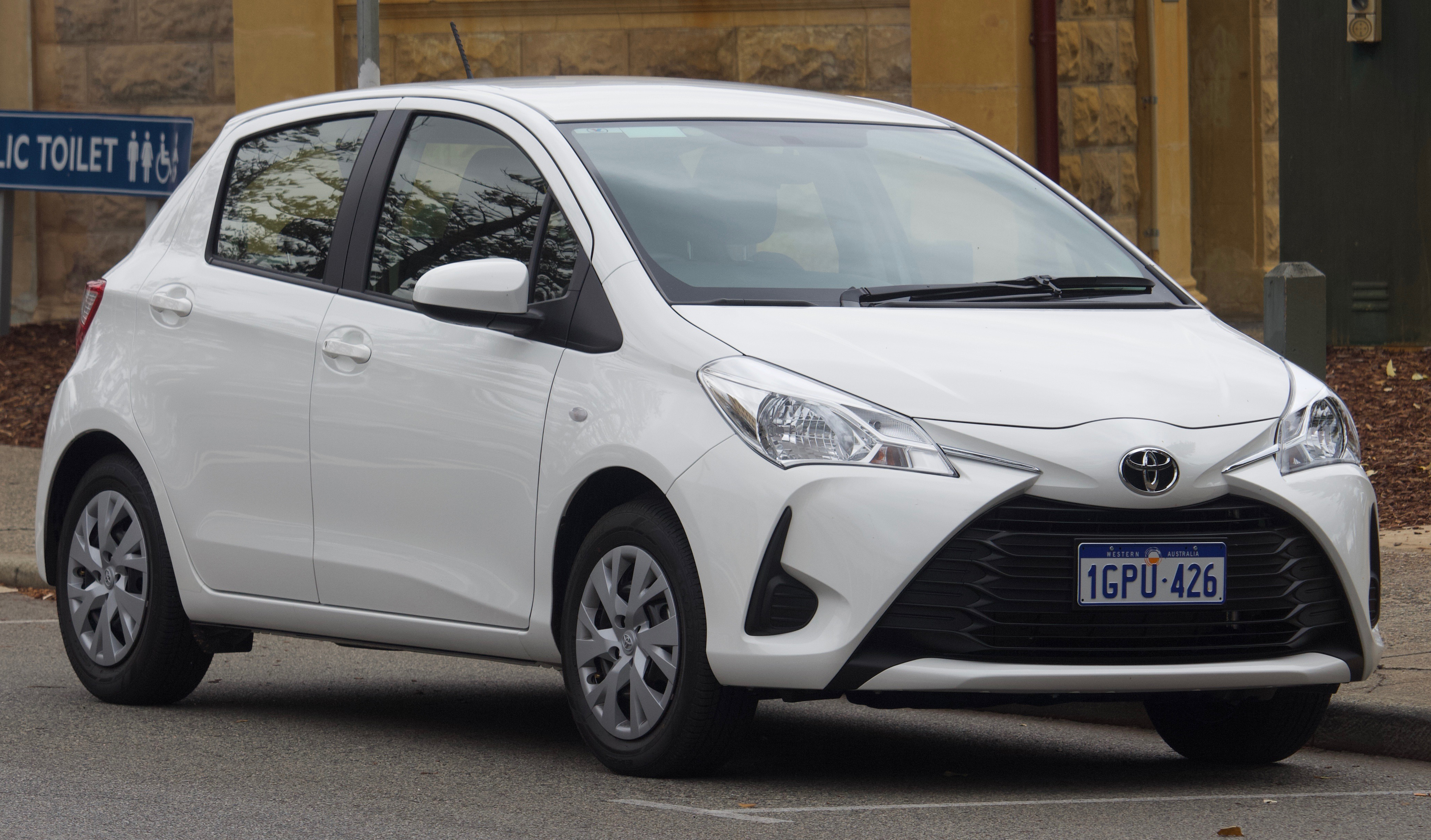
Second facelift

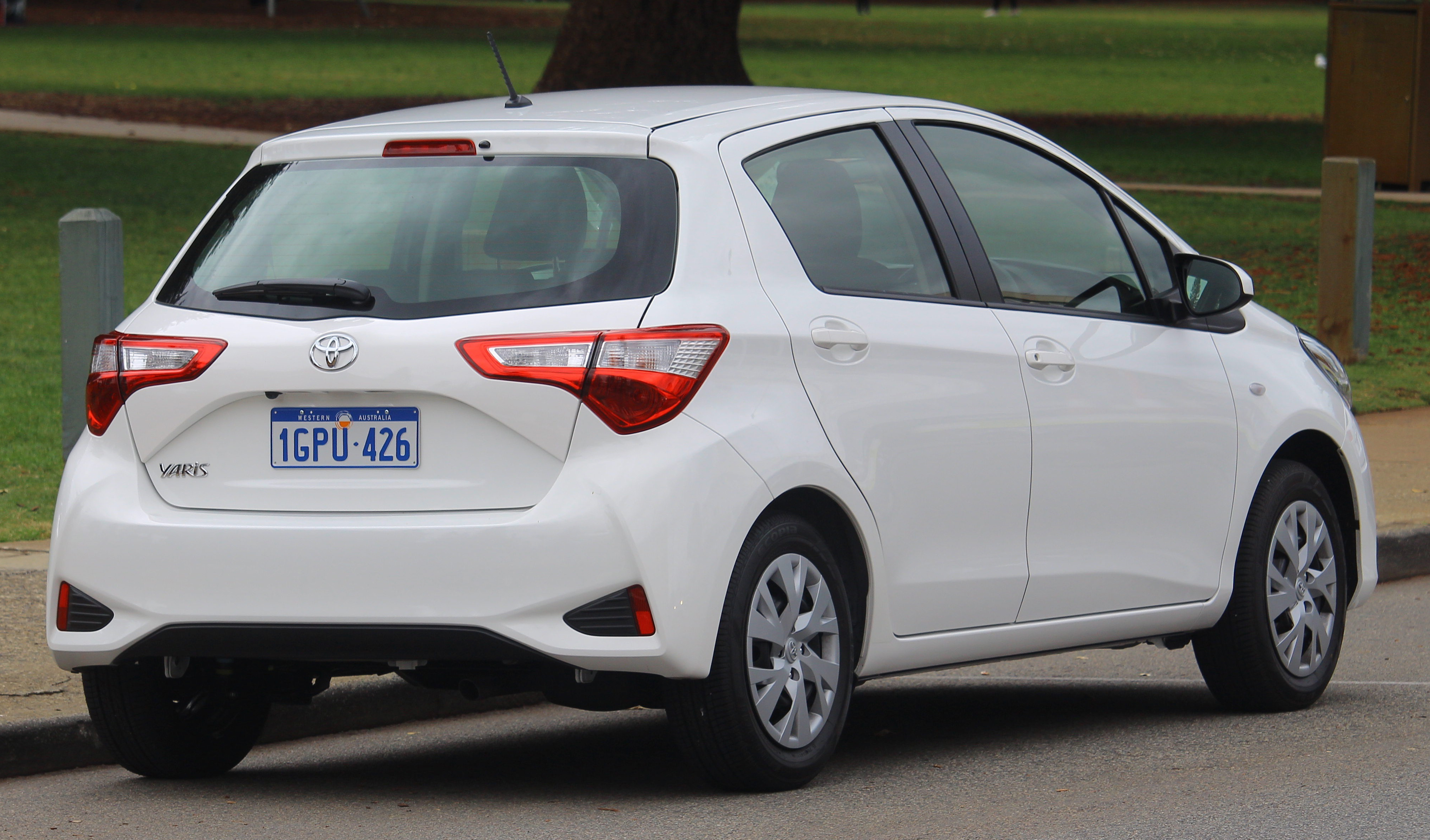
Second facelift

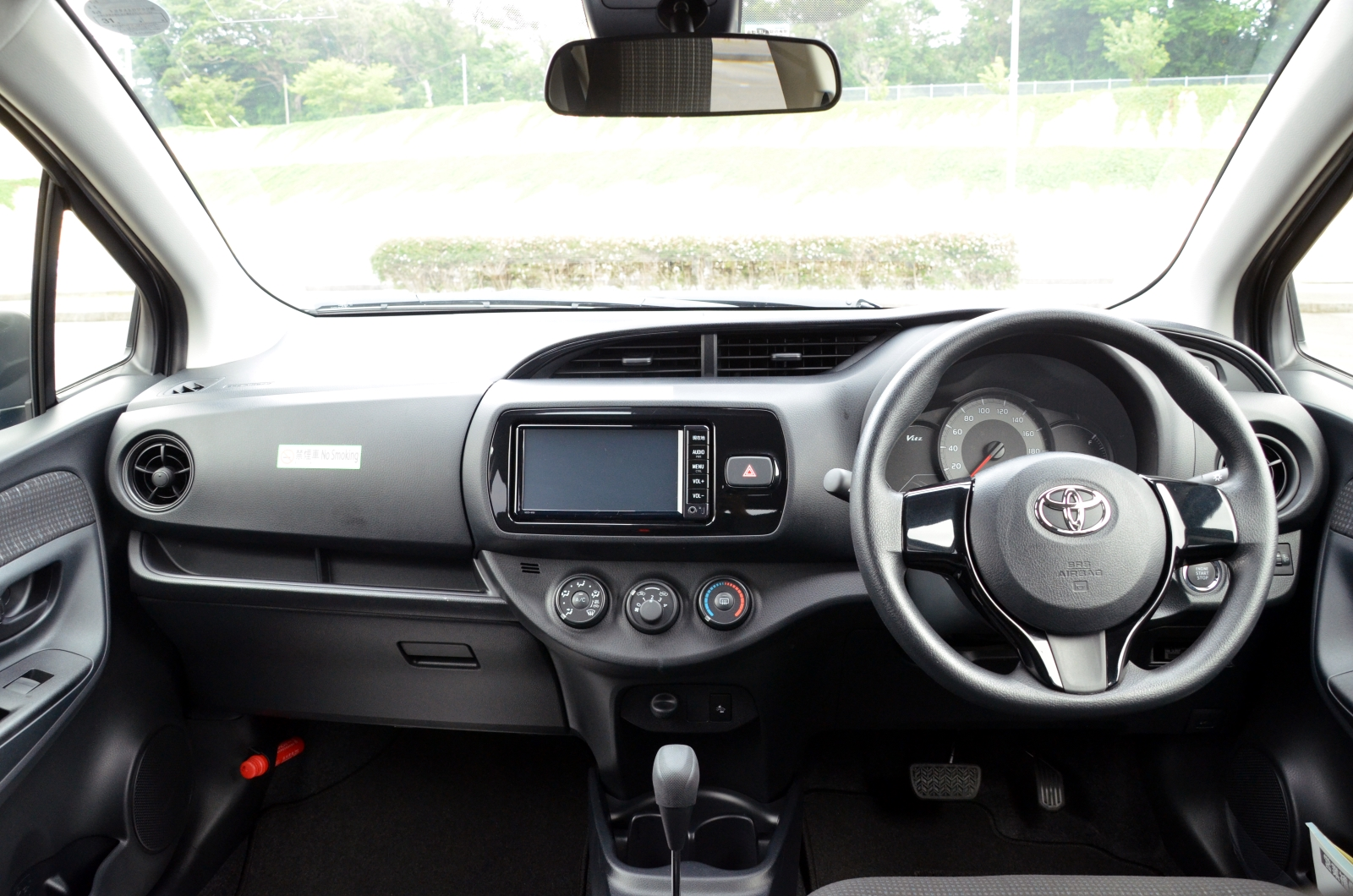
Interior (2017 facelift)

=== Safety ===
Euro NCAP test results* Toyota Yaris (2017)
Test	Points	%
Overall:	5 /5 stars	
Adult occupant:	31.7	83%
Child occupant:	39.5	80%
Pedestrian:	26.7	63%
Safety assist:	6.9	57%

=== Hybrid ===
The Yaris HSD Concept was introduced at the March 2011 Geneva Motor Show featuring a hybrid powertrain. The production version was presented at the March 2012 Geneva Motor Show, and went on sale in June 2012.

The Yaris Hybrid shares the same powertrain as the Toyota Prius c sold in North America and as the Toyota Aqua in Japan. The Prius c is not available in Europe. It has a 1.5 L gasoline engine with a maximum output of 55 kilowatts (74 hp) and a 45-kilowatt (60 hp) electric motor which combine for a total output of 74 kilowatts (99 hp). Its NiMH battery has a capacity of 0.9 kWh.

The Yaris Hybrid sold 23,692 units during 2012. Cumulative sales reached 35,151 units through March 2013.

Pre-facelift

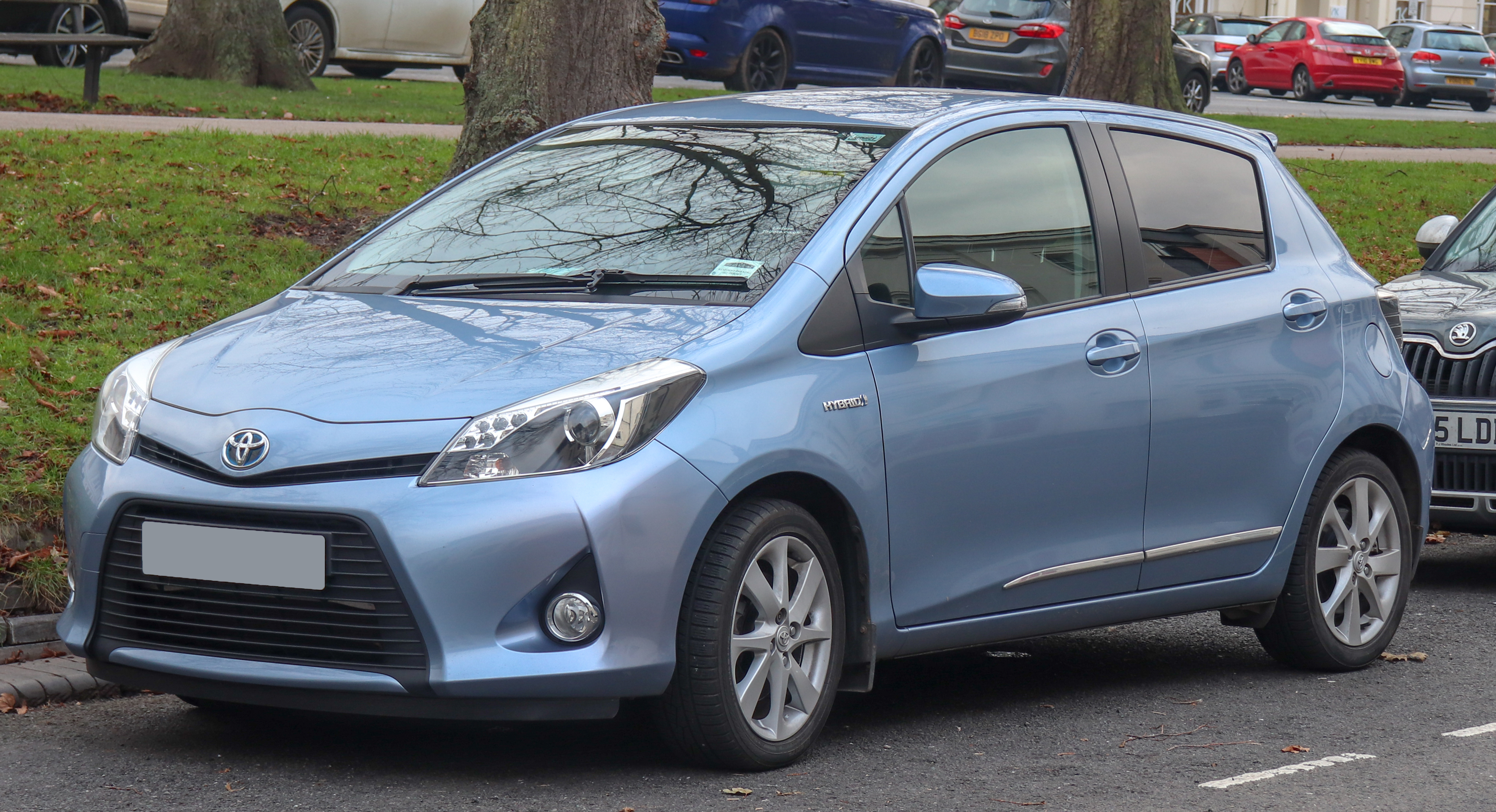
Yaris Hybrid (pre-facelift)

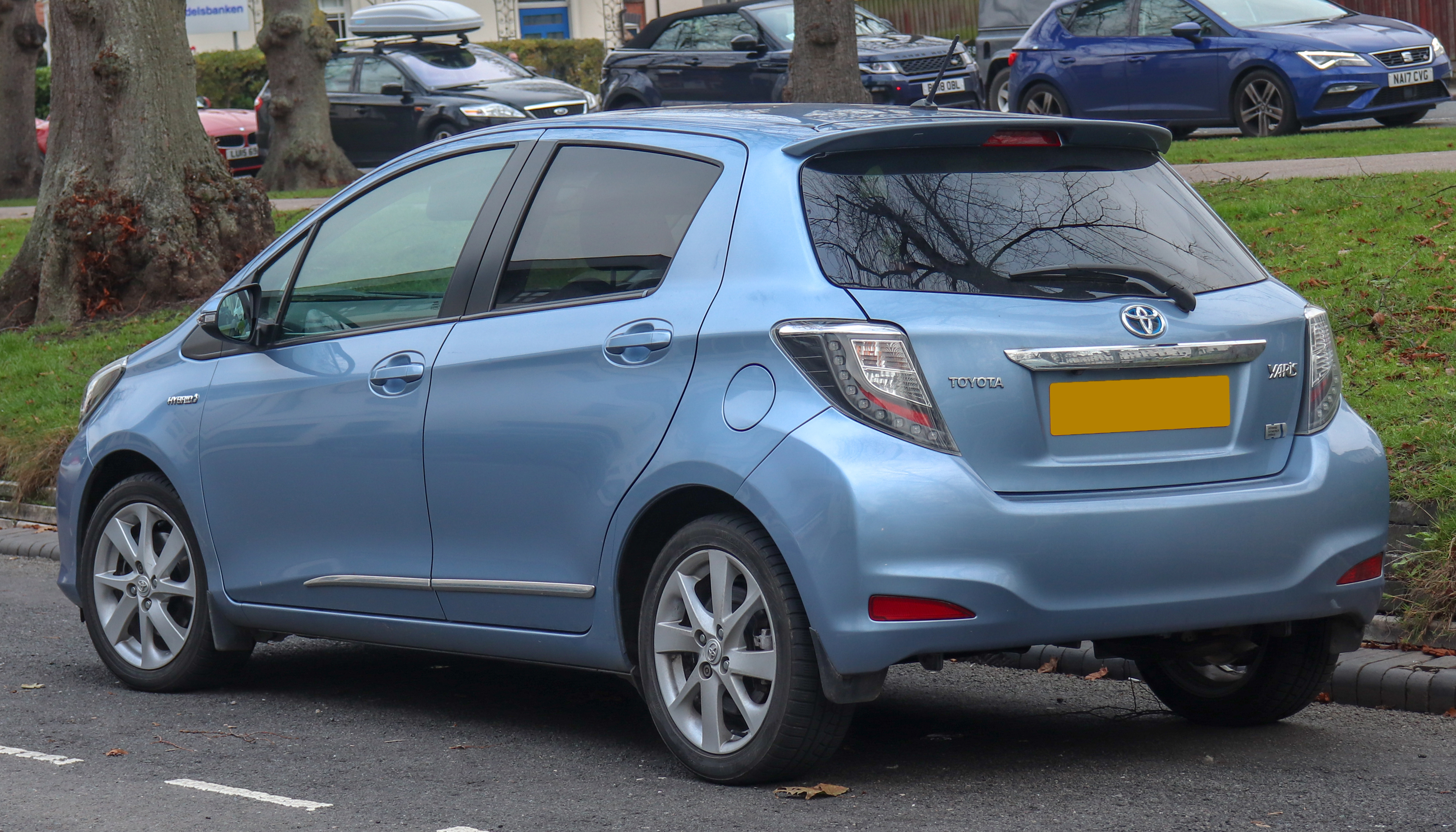
Yaris Hybrid (pre-facelift)

First facelift

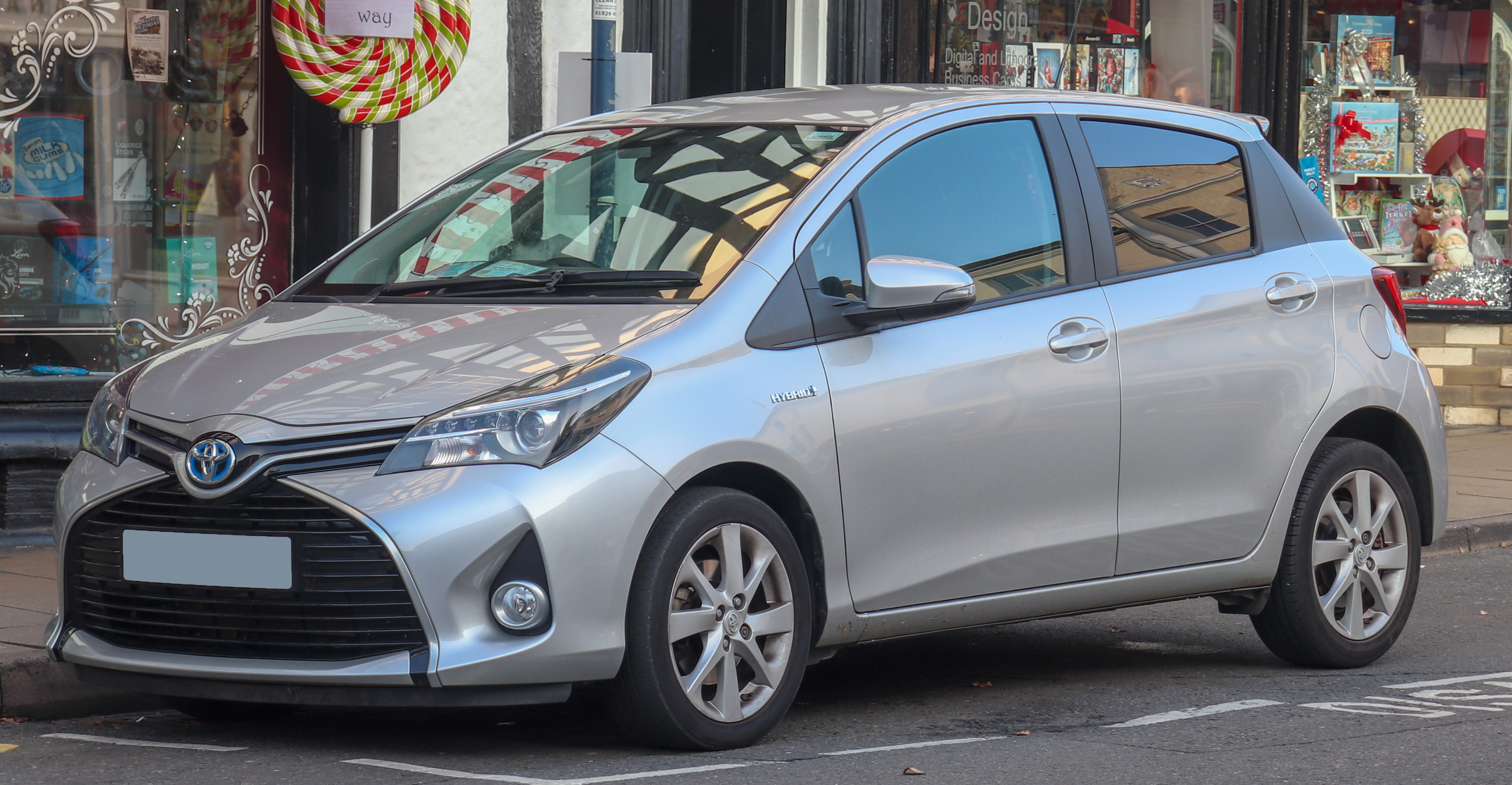
Yaris Hybrid (first facelift)

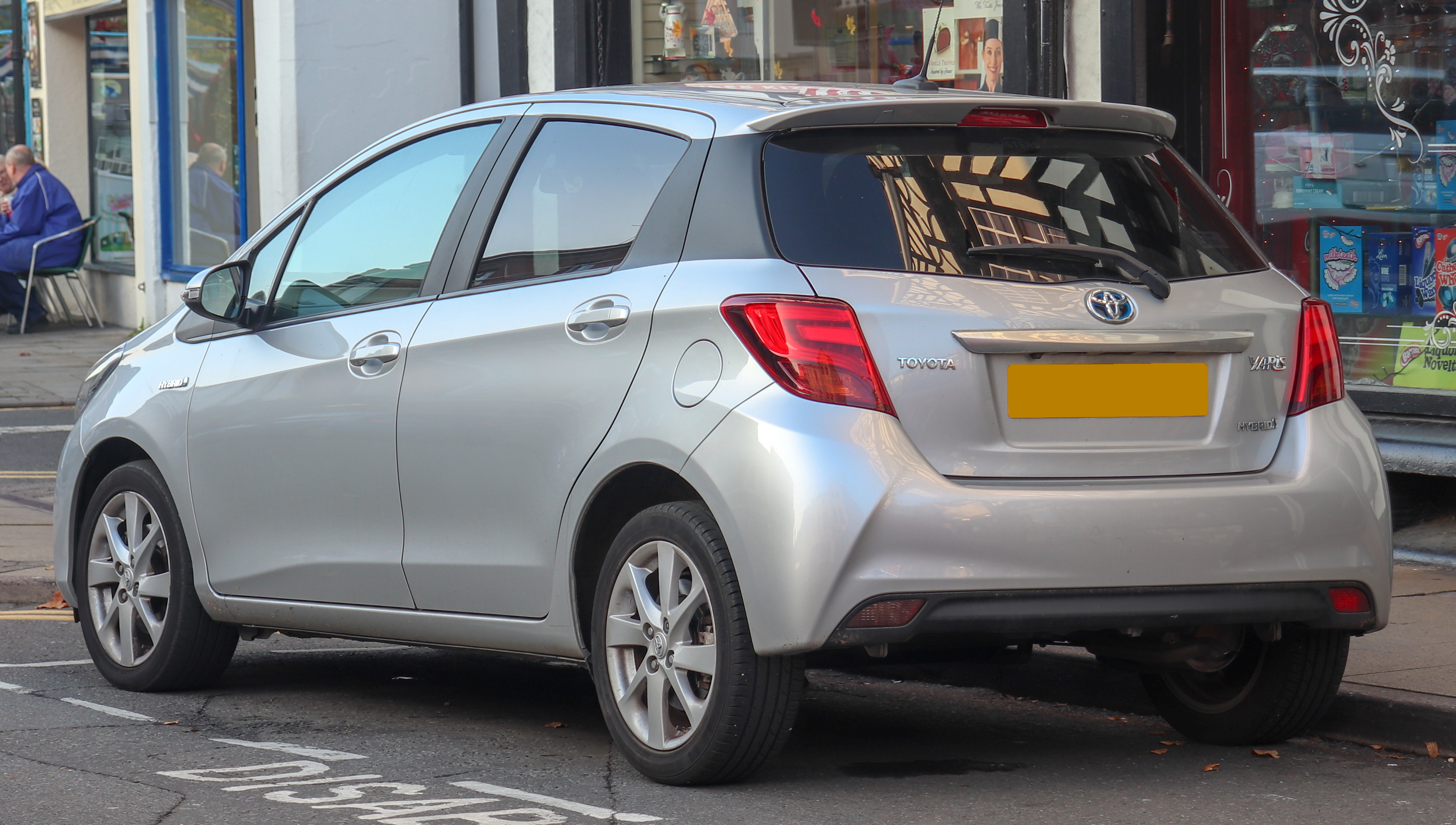
Yaris Hybrid (first facelift)

==== Second facelift ====
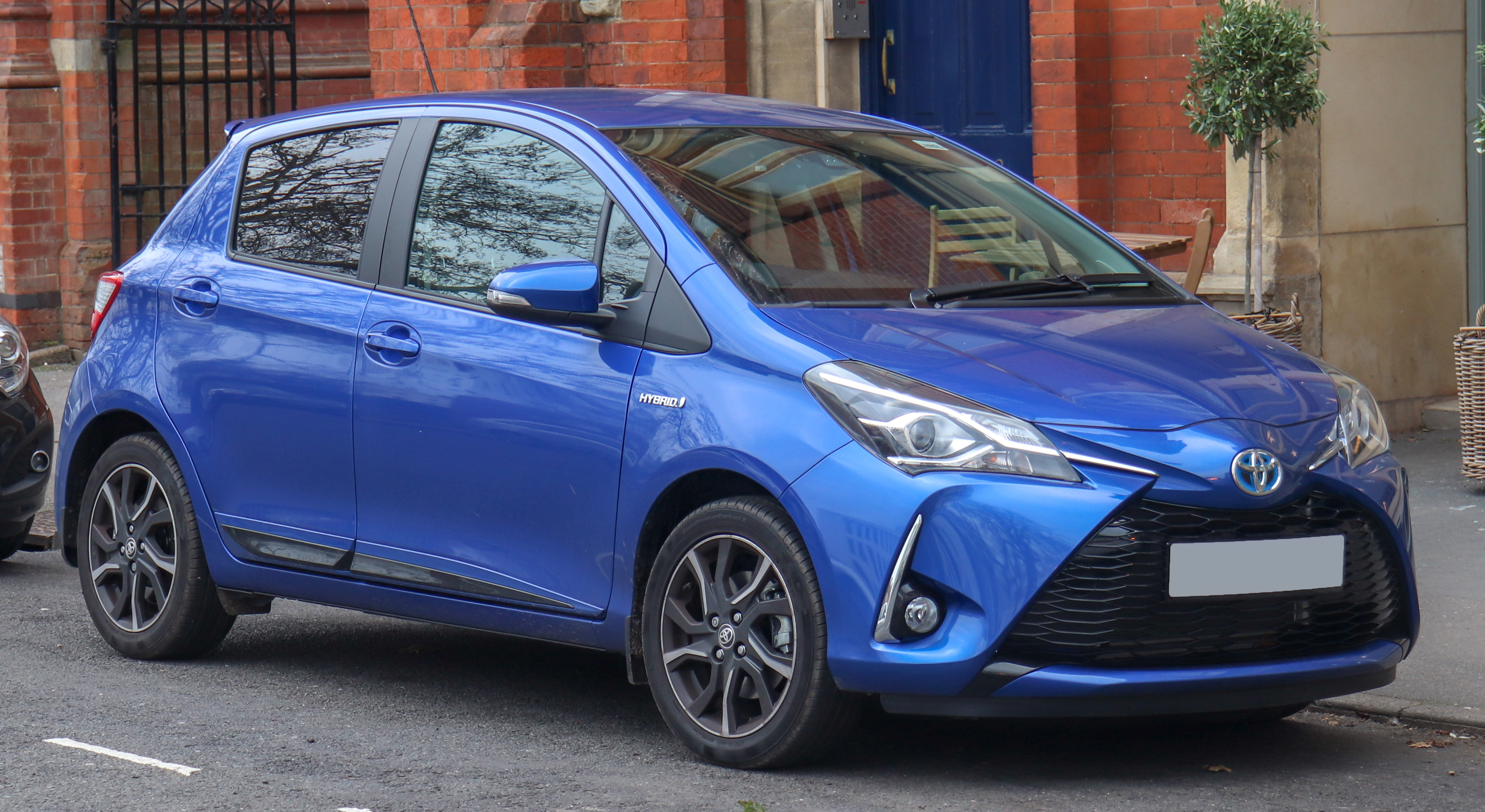
Yaris Hybrid (second facelift)

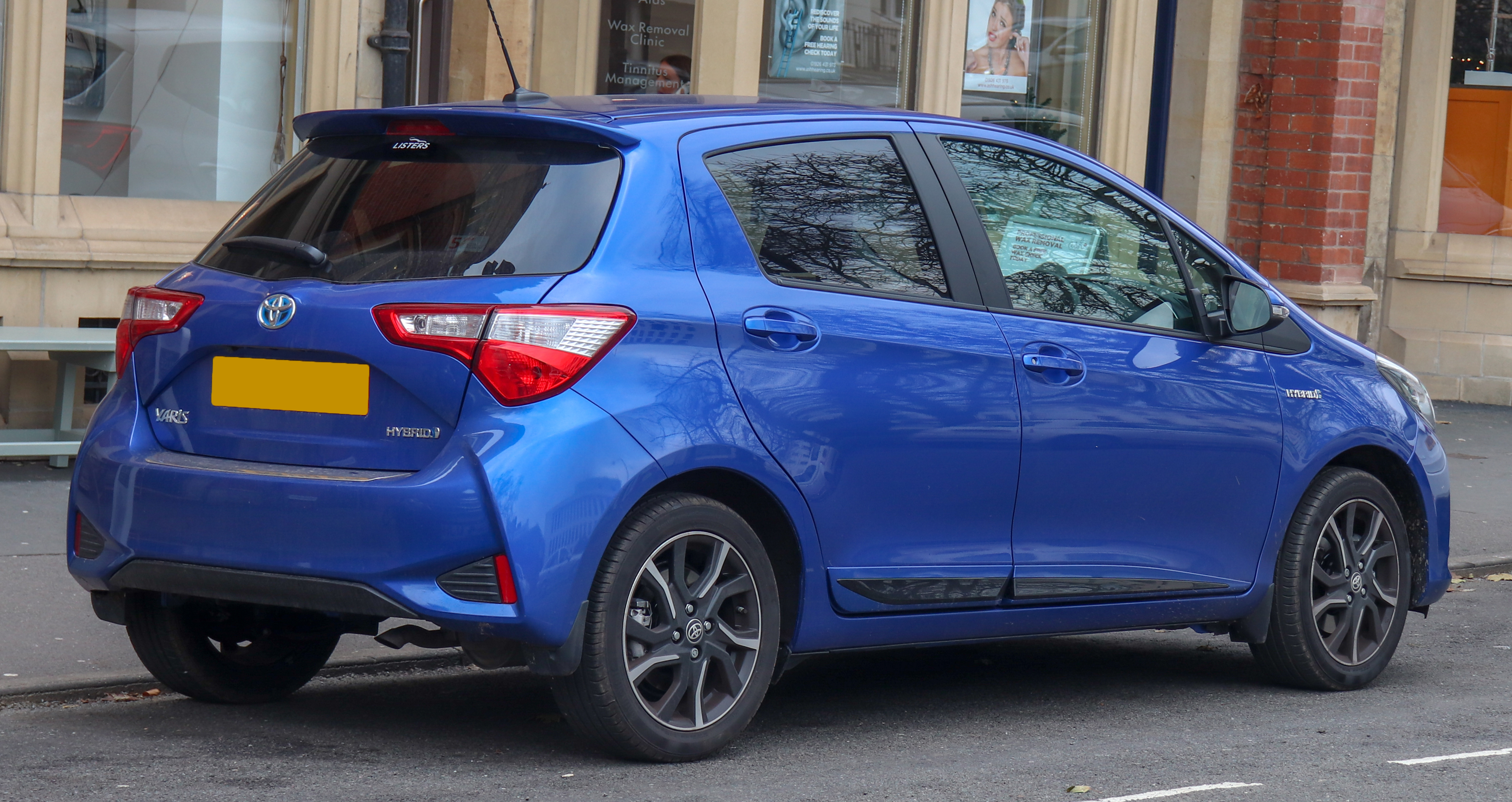
Yaris Hybrid (second facelift)

=== Markets ===
==== Japan ====
The third generation Vitz was launched on 22 December 2010 in Yokohama, Japan. Aerodynamic drag has been reduced with a coefficient drag value of 0.285. Like previous generations, the Vitz remains an exclusive vehicle at Netz dealerships.

This generation introduces a new 1.3-litre 4-cylinder engine which is as economical as the 1.0-litre engine, according to Toyota Japan. New features include a single windscreen wiper and an engine start-stop system with a claimed 26.5 km/L (3.8 L/100 km; 62.3 mpg_{‑US}) for the Japanese streets. The facelift Vitz came with "Toyota Safety Sense C" package including features Lane Departure Alert, Automatic High Beam and Pre-crash safety system. Pre-crash safety system alarm will work when vehicle is between 15km/h to 140km/h, whereas automatic brakes will apply when vehicle is between 10km/h to 80km/h. The XP130 model comes with up to nine airbags: driver and front passenger airbags, front-seat mounted side airbags, a knee airbag for the driver, first and second row side-curtain airbags and two front seat cushion airbags.

The Vitz was offered in F, U, Jewela and RS model grades. The engines available range from 1.0- to 1.5-litres. The 1.5-litre RS model has a CVT transmission for the automatic, sporty front fascia and taillamps. Just like the previous generation, 2WD and 4WD drivetrains are available in Japan. The different engine size choices give Japanese drivers an option as to which annual road tax obligation they wish to pay, and larger engines are installed in vehicles with higher levels of optional equipment. On 6 September 2011, new RS G's sport trim based on the regular RS was launched. This model has new aero bodykit, tuned suspensions, lightweight 17-inch aluminium wheels and high performance tires.

The Vitz received its facelift on 21 April 2014. The F, U and Jewela models received the updated front fascia that was only marketed in Japan, while the RS model shares the front fascia with the facelifted Yaris in export markets, but with different headlamps and tail lamps (also marketed as the Yaris ZR in Australia). The RS model was discontinued and replaced by the Sporty package variant of the U model with the second facelift in January 2017. The GR Sport and GR variant of the Vitz was introduced on 19 September 2017, as part of the Gazoo Racing series lineup, replacing both RS and RS G's trims.

In Japan, a sharp drop in sales from a height of 160,000 a year to 87,000 prompted Toyota to rebrand the Vitz as Yaris in order to expand its middle-aged customer base.

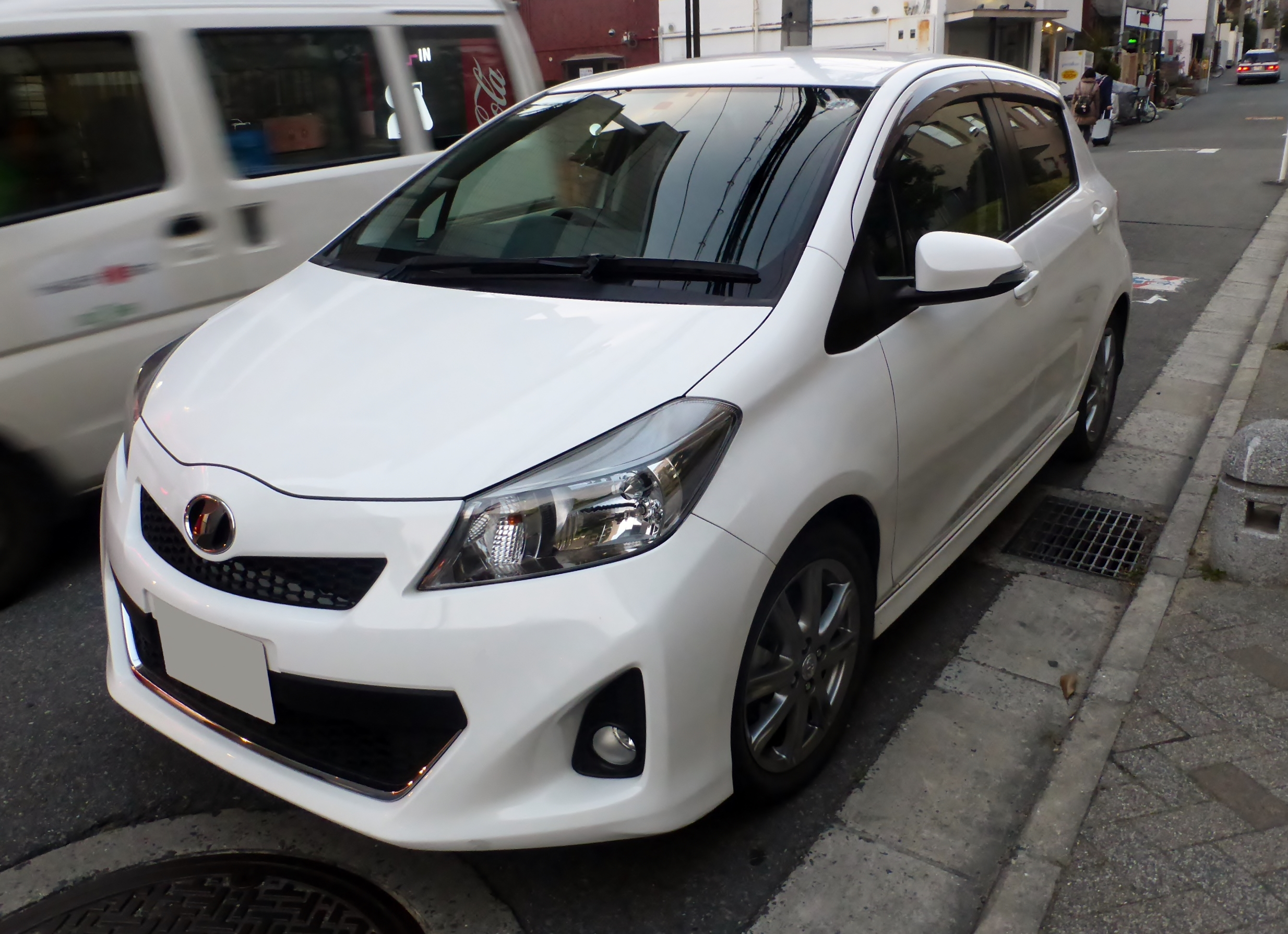
Pre-facelift: Vitz RS 5-door (Japan)

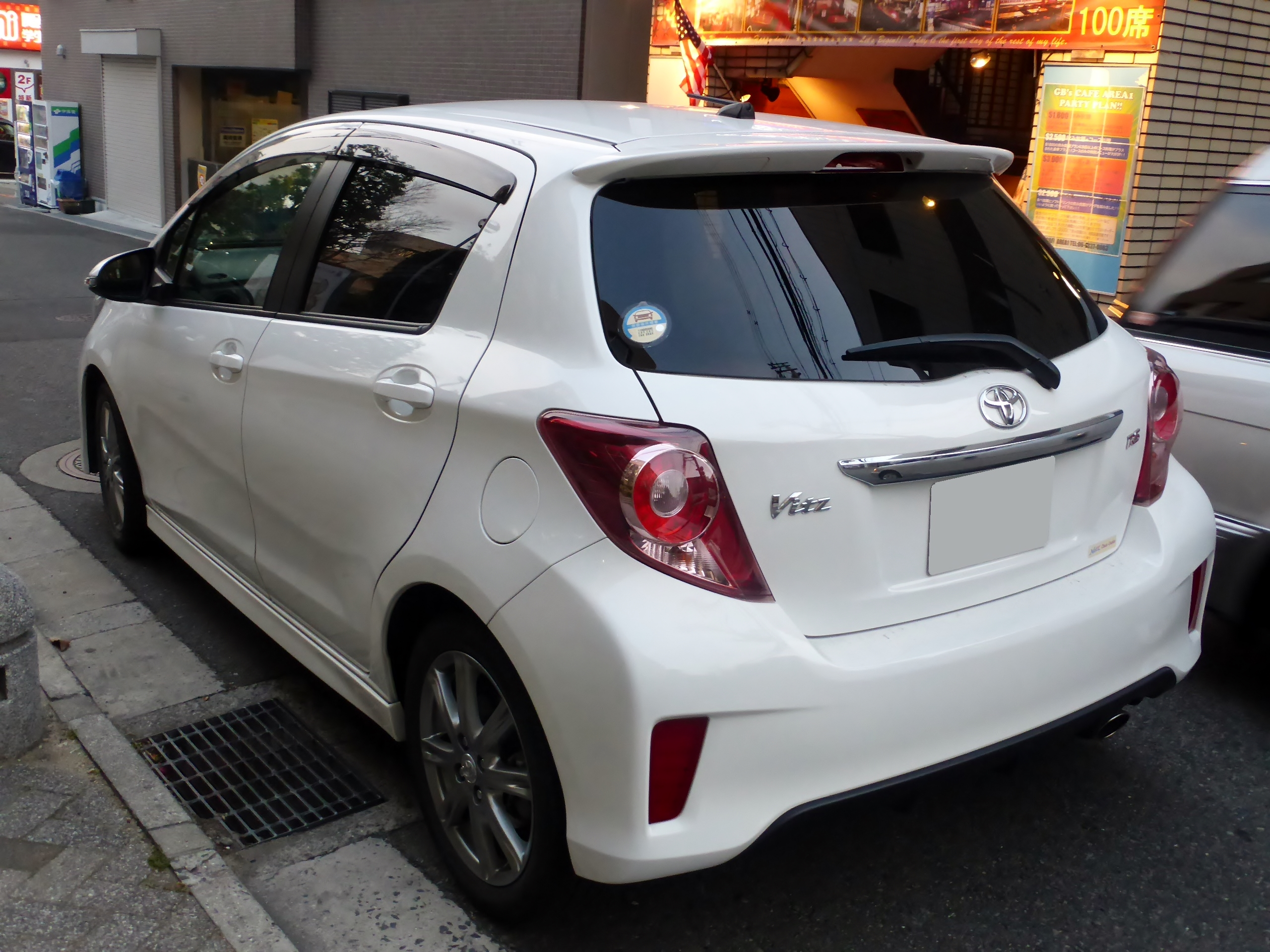
Pre-facelift: Vitz RS 5-door (Japan)

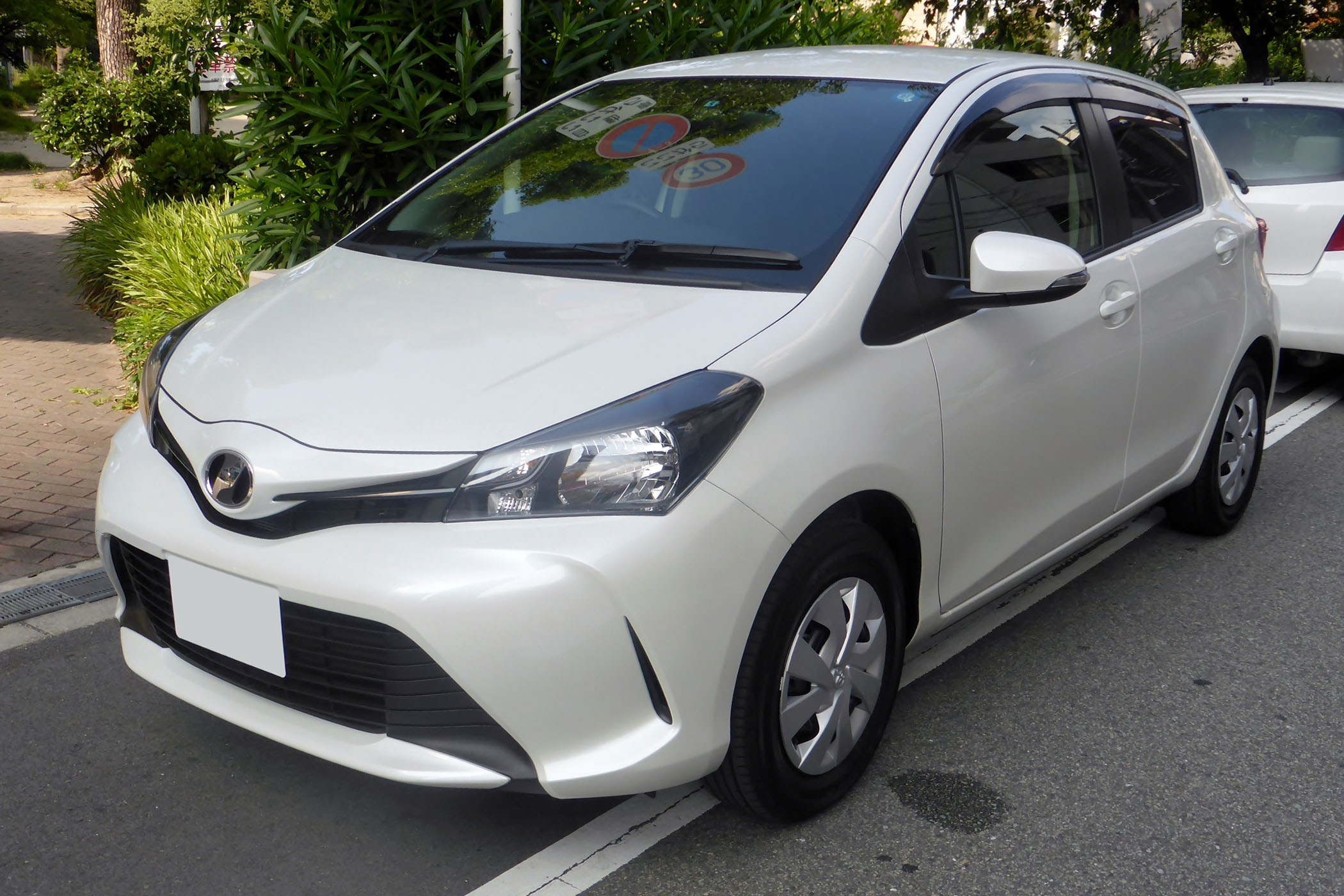
2014 facelift: Vitz 1.3F 5-door (Japan)

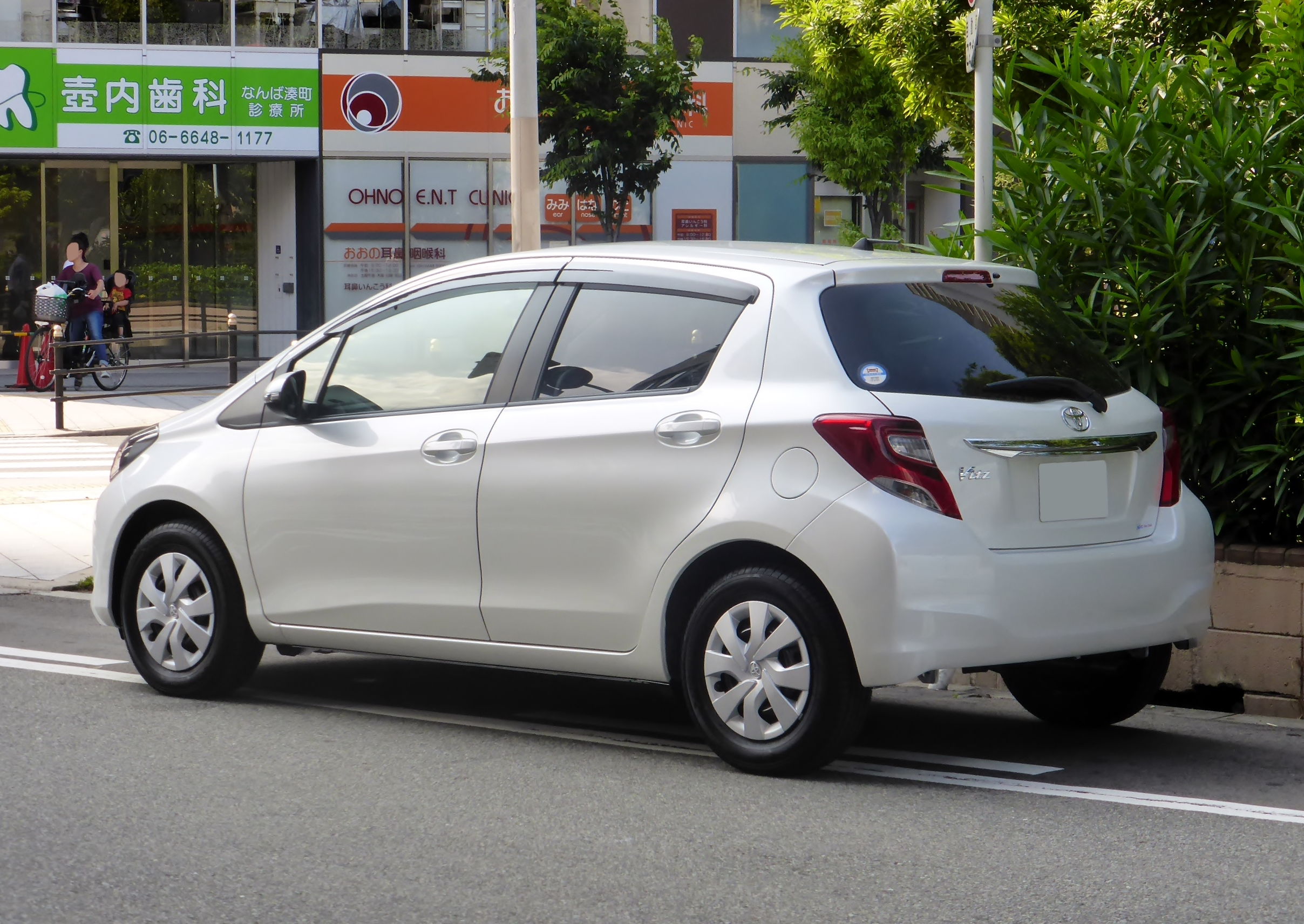
2014 facelift: Vitz 1.3F 5-door (Japan)

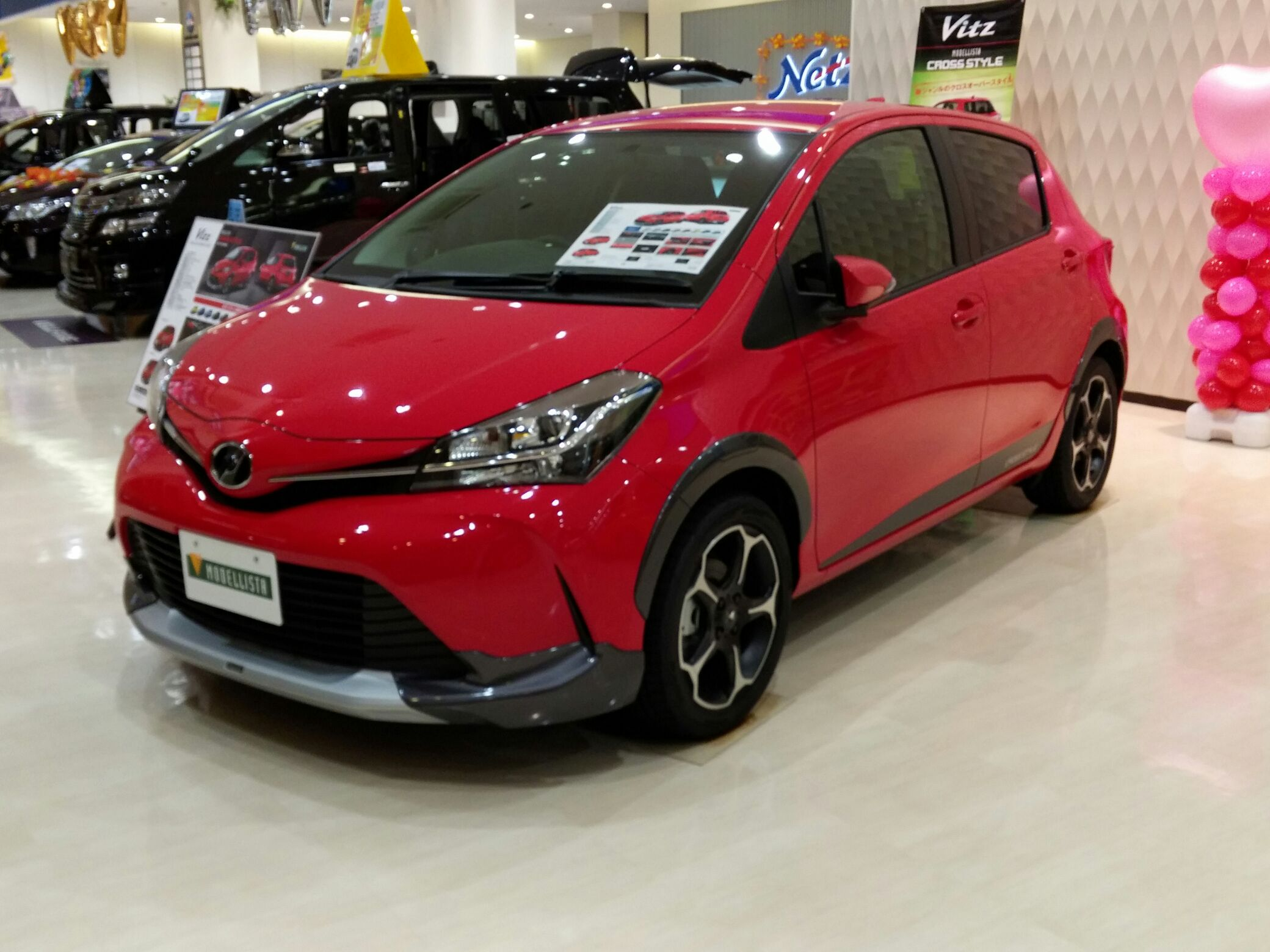
2014 facelift: Vitz Modellista Cross Style 5-door (Japan)

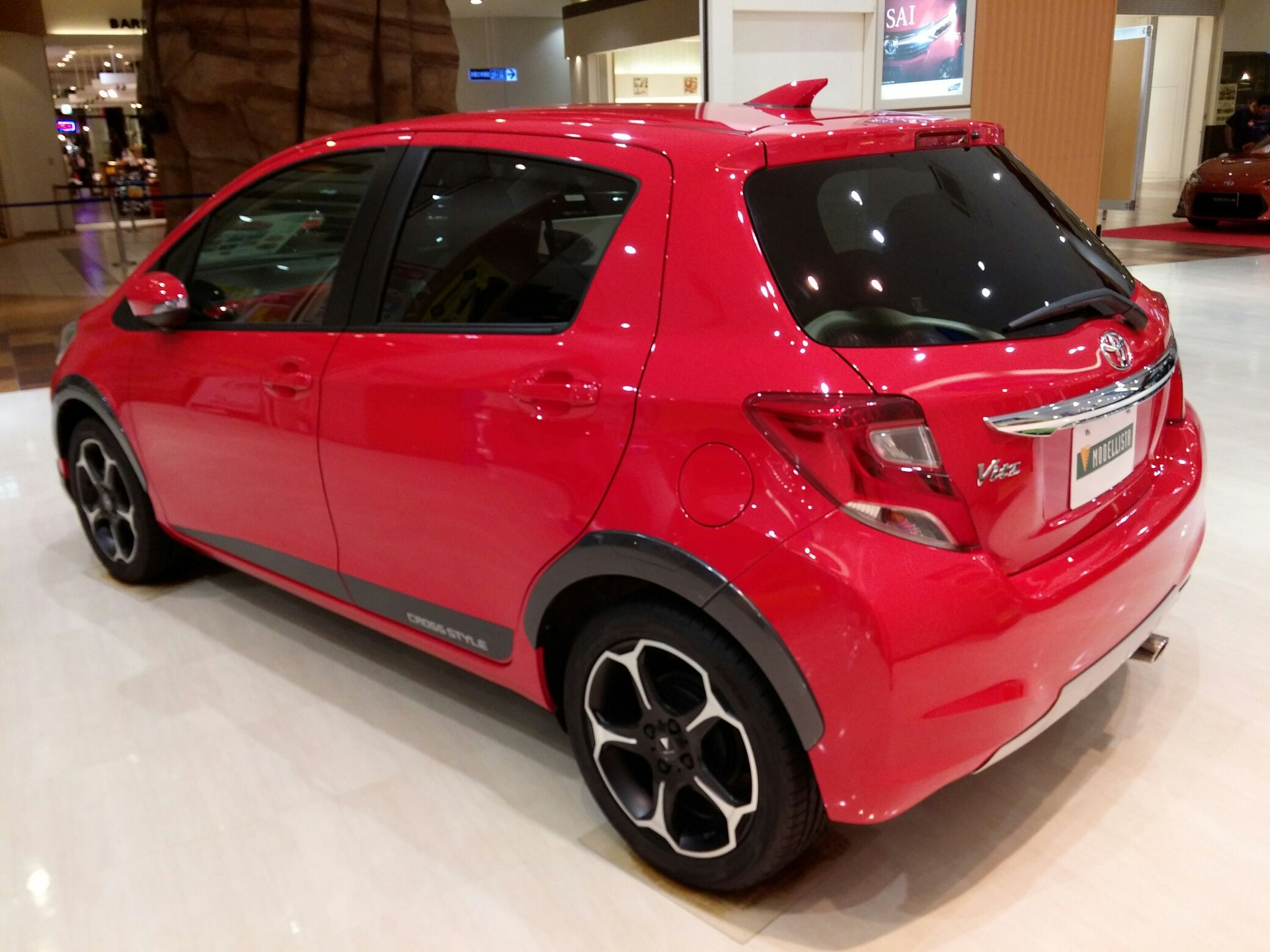
2014 facelift: Vitz Modellista Cross Style 5-door (Japan)

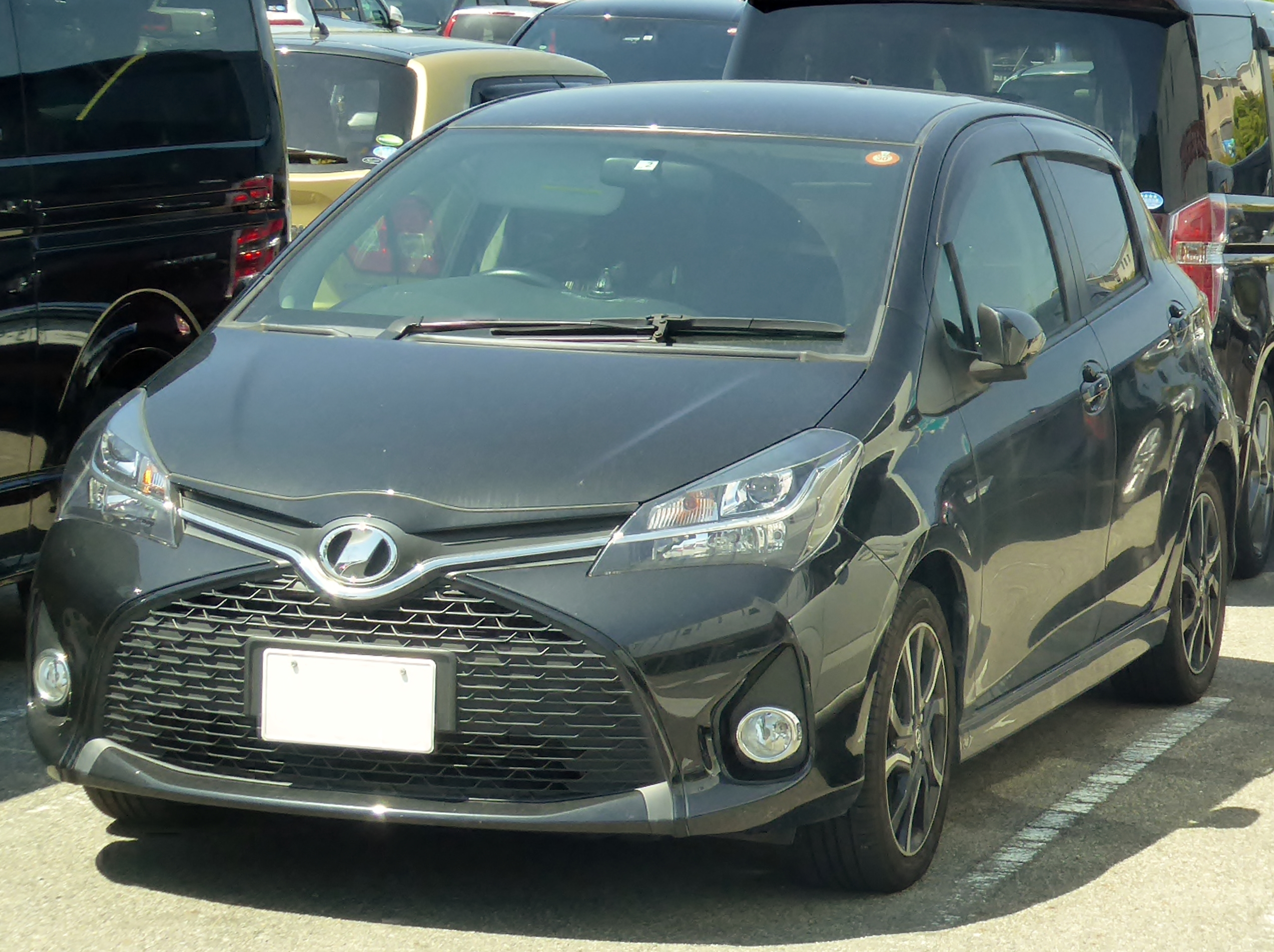
2014 facelift: Vitz RS 5-door (Japan)

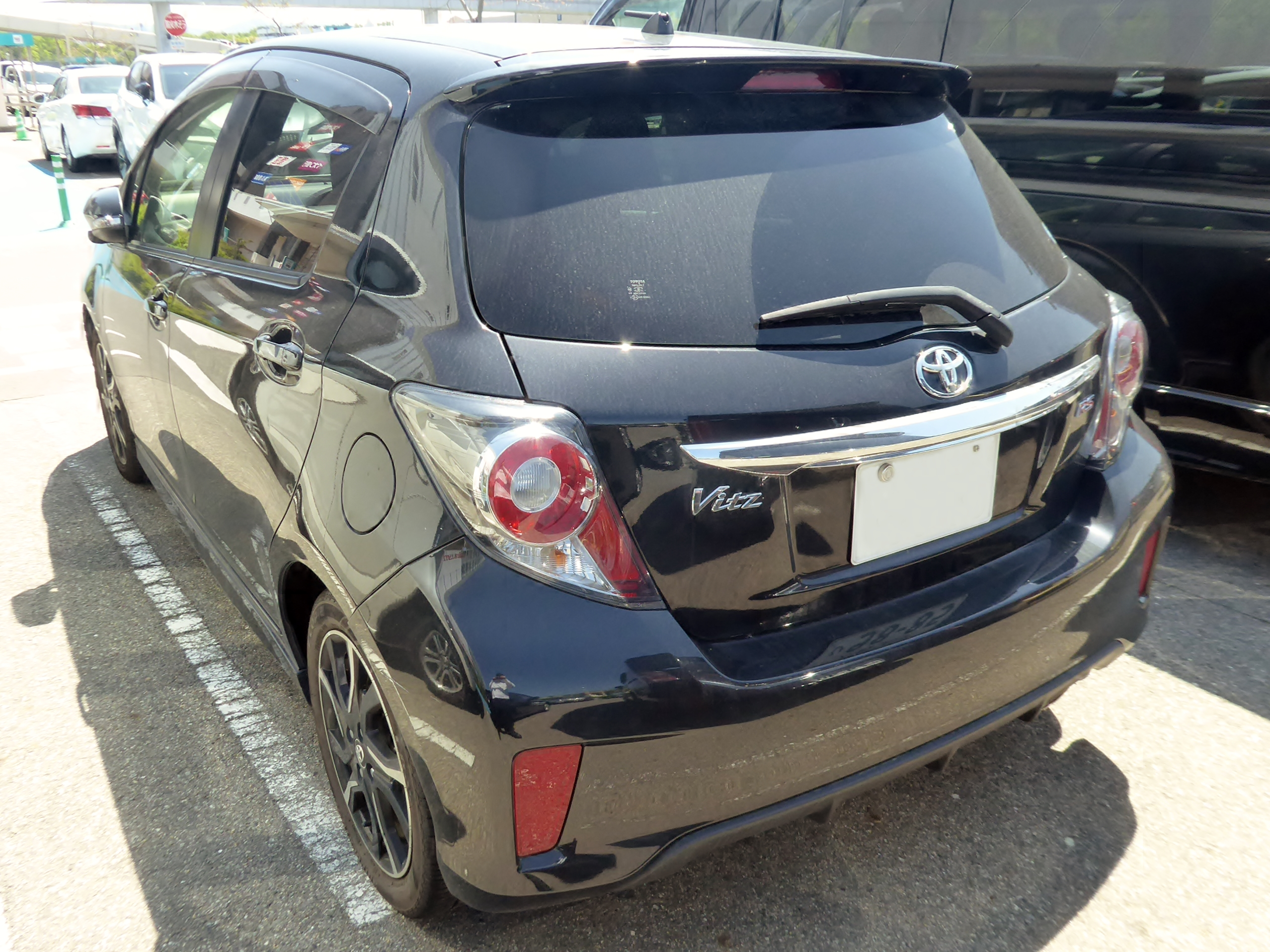
2014 facelift: Vitz RS 5-door (Japan)

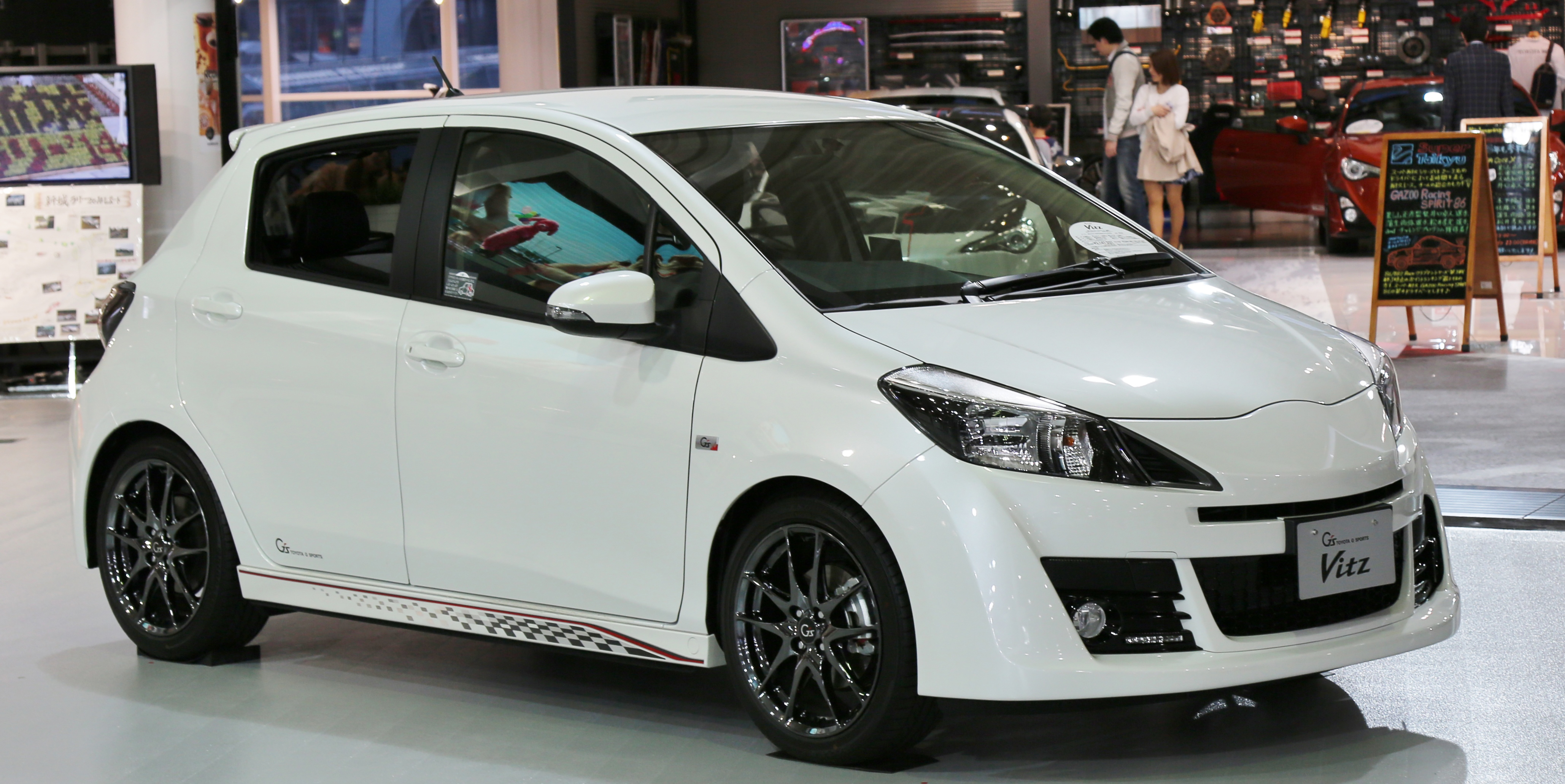
Vitz RS G's (Japan)

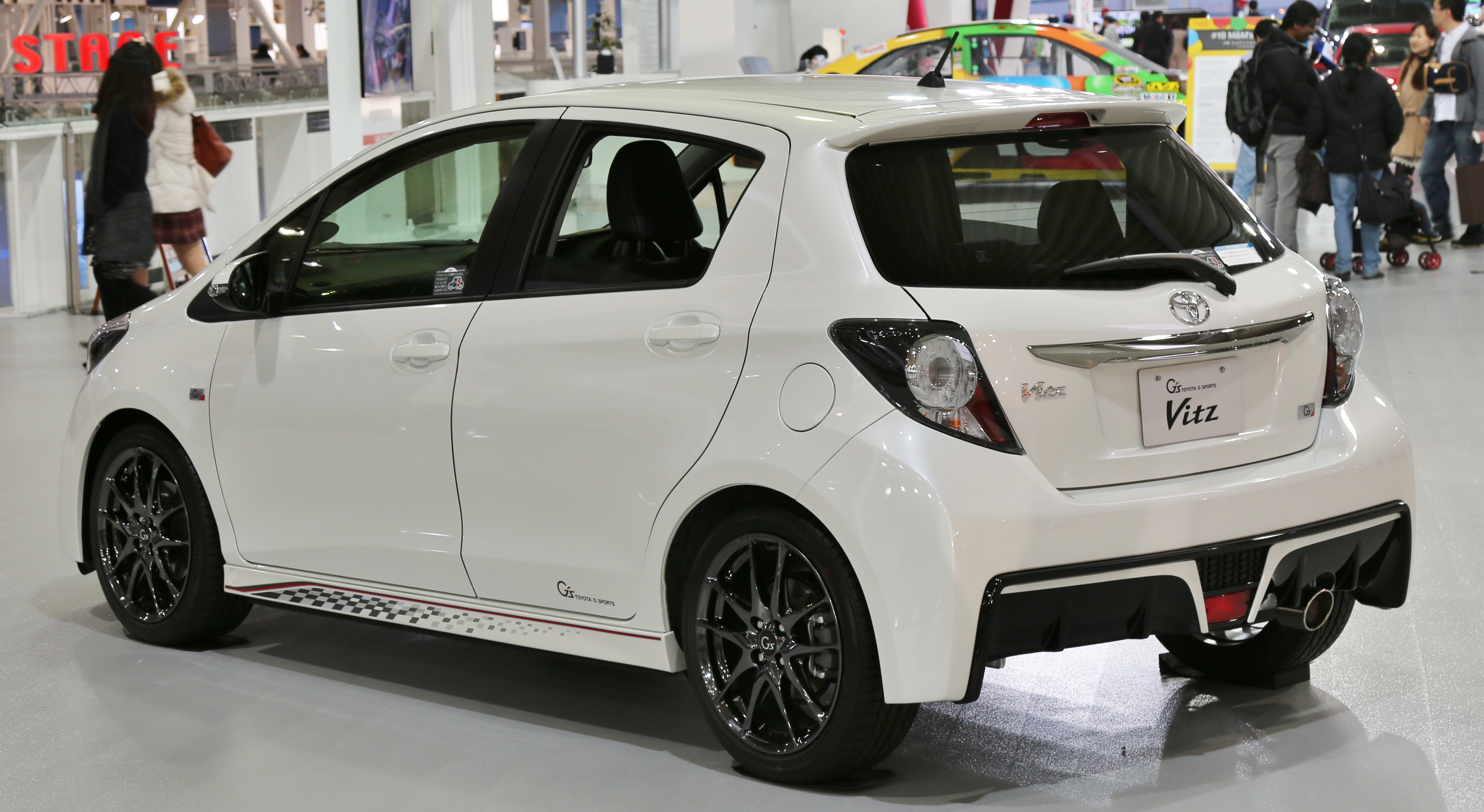
Vitz RS G's (Japan)

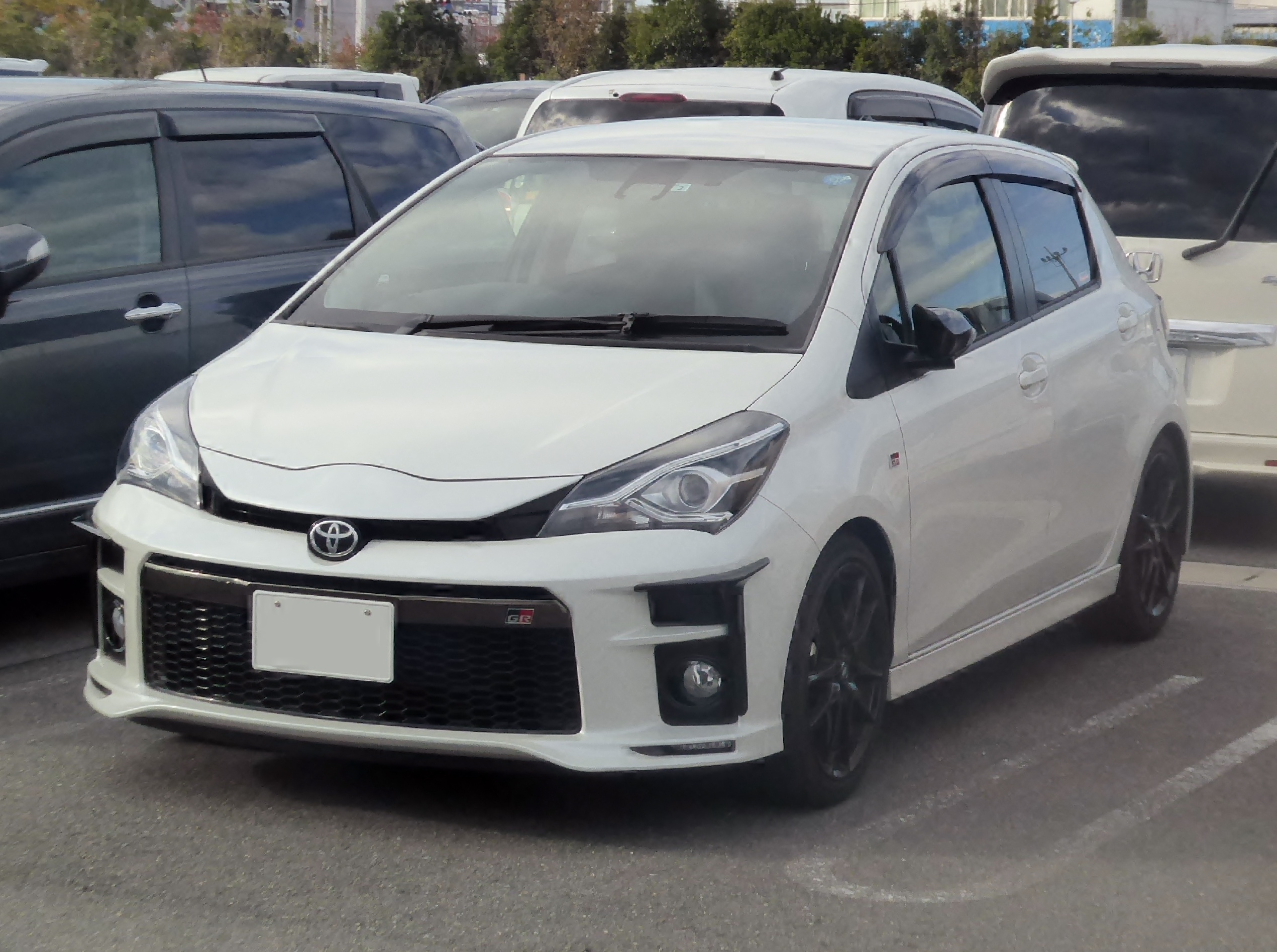
Vitz GR (Japan)

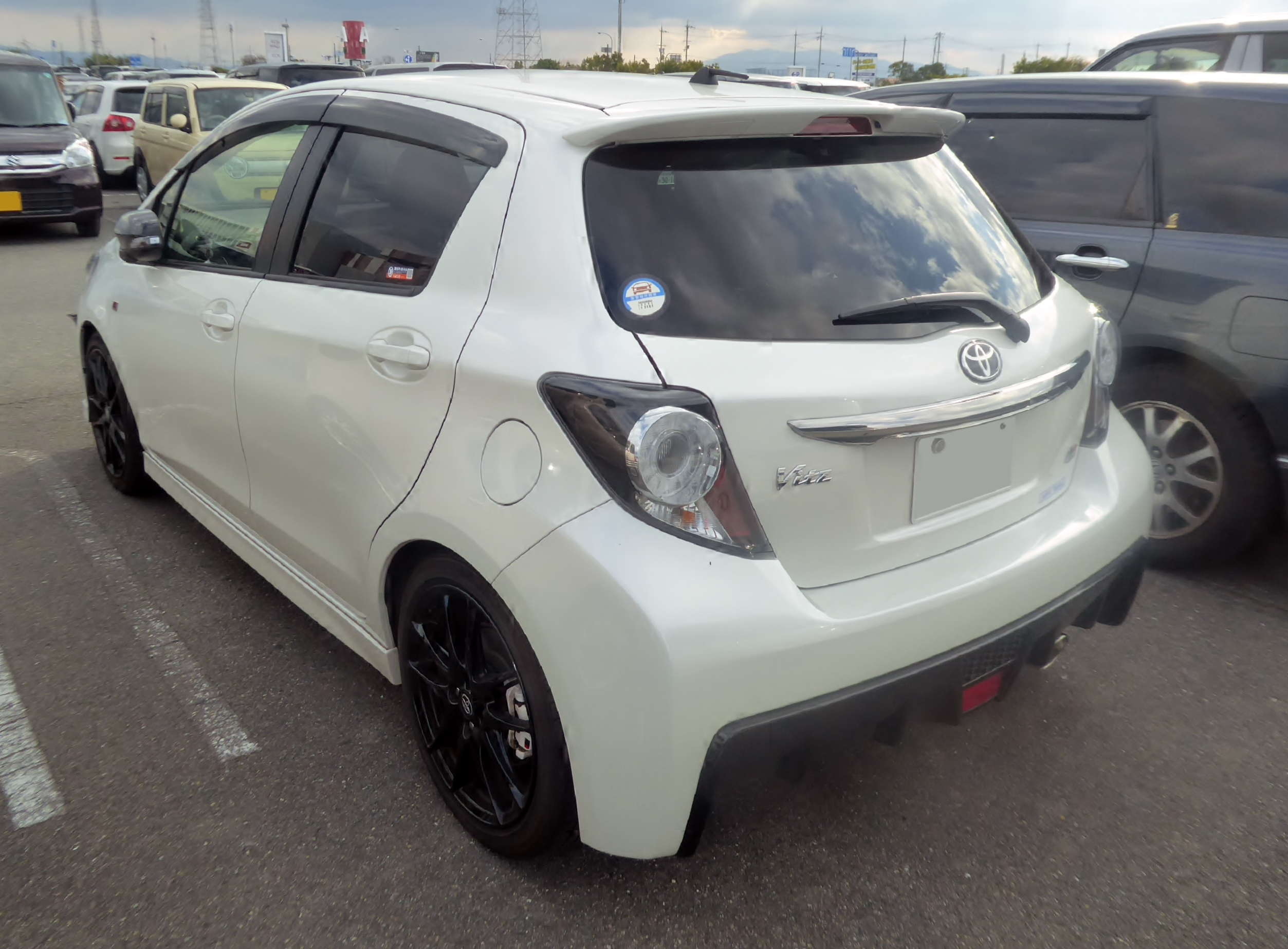
Vitz GR (Japan)

==== Europe ====
The third generation Yaris/Vitz entered production in Toyota Motor Manufacturing France plant in June 2011 and was launched in September of the same year. The Yaris Hybrid assembly started in April 2012.

Toyota Motor Manufacturing France started to build the Yaris for export to the US, Canadian and Puerto Rican markets from May 2013 until 2019.

A facelift version was introduced in 2014. Both the original and facelift share the drivetrain and transmission choices, however, the facelift claims to have improved ride comfort and interior quality among other features.

The production of the third generation Yaris in TMMF was stopped in June 2020.

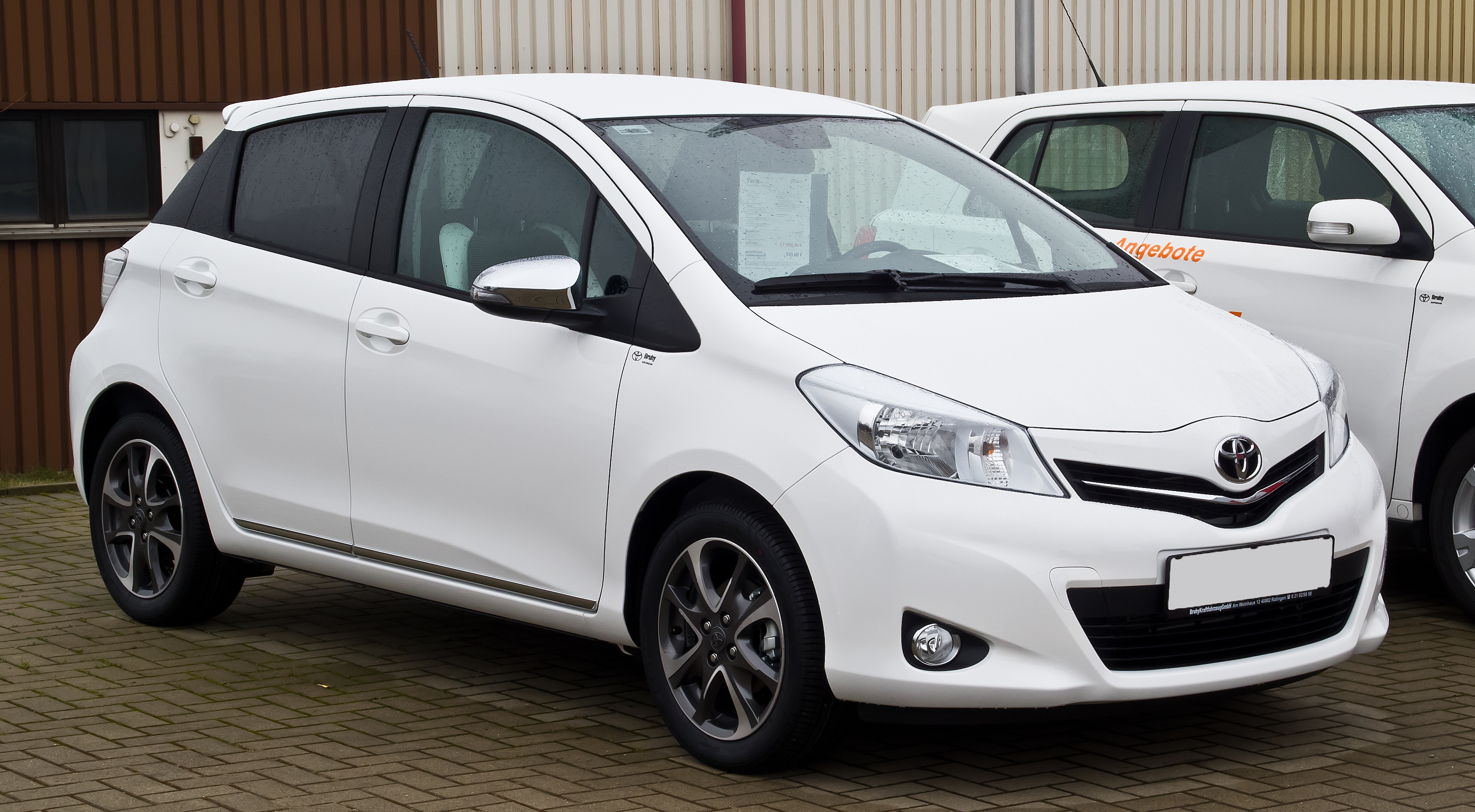
Yaris Trend (pre-facelift)

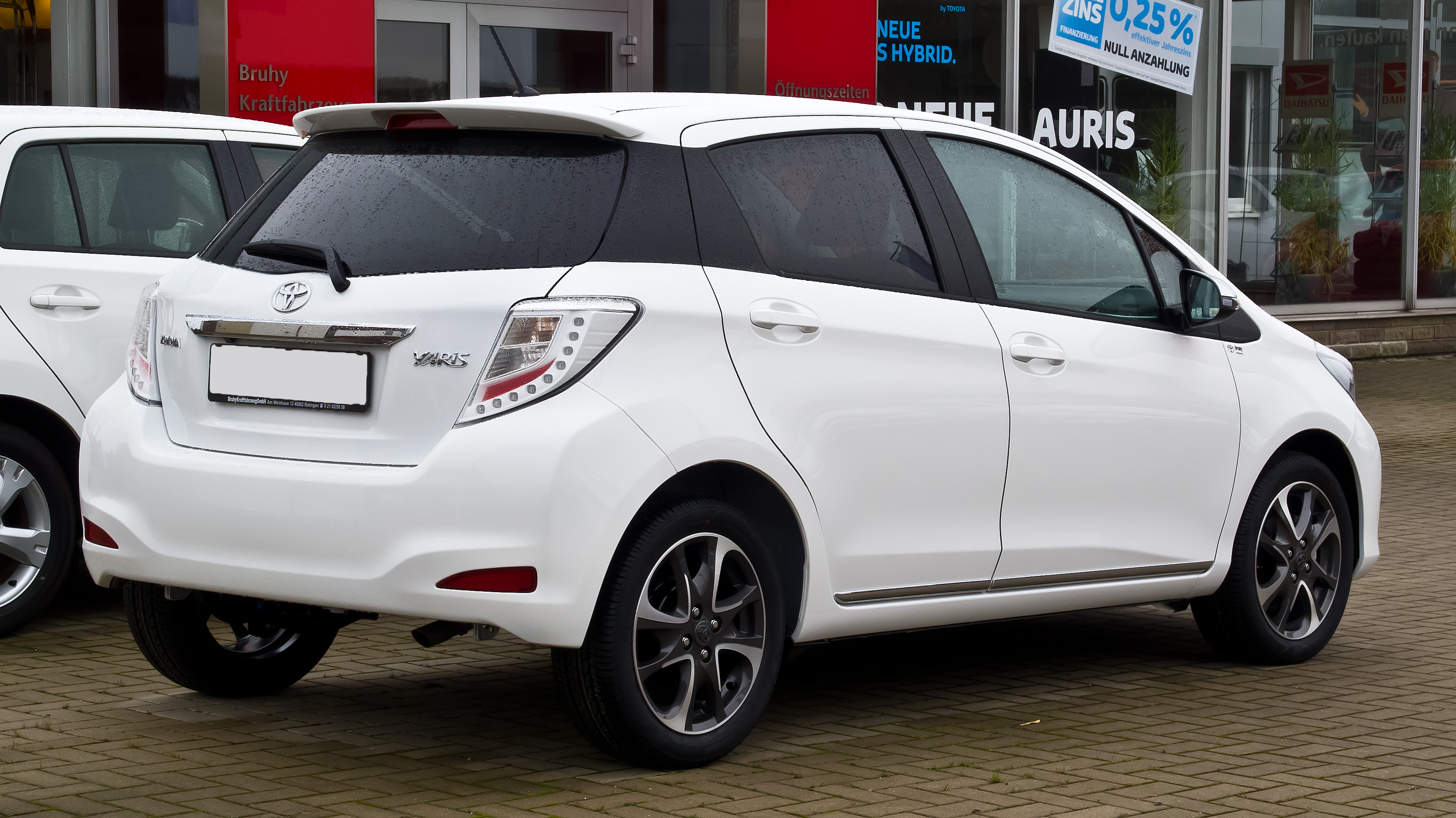
Yaris Trend (pre-facelift)

==== Asia ====
In 2013, a different XP150 series Yaris which is based on the XP150 series Vios sedan was launched in some Asian markets, including many Southeast Asian regions. This version is not related to the XP130 series Vitz-based Yaris, instead, the XP150 series Yaris is based on the EFC platform.

In Singapore, the local dealer launched the XP130 series Yaris in 1.33-litre variant in the first quarter of 2013 to mid-2014. It was the only Asian country outside Japan and Hong Kong to source the Vitz-based Yaris.

==== Australia ====
The XP130 series Yaris for the Australian market was revealed at the July 2011 Australian International Motor Show held in Melbourne. The new Yaris has a sportier, more rounded grille and redesigned front bumper. The Australian Yaris comes in either a 1.3-litre or 1.5-litre powered petrol engine. Models sold are the basic YR, the mid-range YRS, YRX and the sportier ZR which features a sporty bumper with body kit. The basic YR model features 7 SRS airbags and Multi-Information Display as standard. Since the facelift in 2014, the range is 5-door only and has had a name change. They are now: Ascent for the base model, SX for the mid-range and ZR is the top level. In January 2017, there was another facelift and tech change, this bought a slightly different headlight/bumper/grille combination and Toyota Safety sense (auto high beam, lane departure alert and autonomous braking) became an option on Ascent and SX and standard on ZR.

==== United States and Canada ====
For the North American market, the XP130 series Yaris was released in the fourth quarter of 2011, for the 2012 model year, under the Yaris Liftback name. Offered in both three- and five-door hatchback styles, the Yaris Liftback offered only the previous generation's 1.5-litre engine with a five-speed manual or optional four-speed automatic transmission. The 2012 model year three- and five-door hatchbacks were available in the base L (CE in Canada), mid-range LE and sport-tuned SE trim levels. The SE was available only as a five-door and came with larger 16-inch alloy wheels, sport-tuned suspension and disk brakes on all four wheels. For the 2012 model year, the Yaris Liftback had nine standard airbags. For the 2015 model year, it was given a facelift.

The Yaris Liftback was discontinued in the United States for the 2019 model year but remained available in Canada. In early 2019, the Mazda2-based Yaris hatchback debuted at the 2019 New York International Auto Show and replaced the Yaris Liftback in both countries.

In the US, the previous XP90 Yaris sedan was replaced by the Scion iA, a rebadged Mazda2 sedan, from the 2016 model year until the Scion marque was dropped. The iA was later renamed to the Yaris iA, and then back to the Yaris sedan. However, the Scion iA was marketed as the Yaris sedan in Canada since its introduction.

==== Vitz/Yaris GRMN ====
The Vitz/Yaris GRMN (Gazoo Racing, tuned by the Meister of the Nürburgring) is a limited-production high-performance variant of the Vitz/Yaris. There are two variants of these limited-production Vitz/Yaris. The first variant was launched in August 2013, this model is powered by a turbocharged 1.5-litre 1NZ-FE Turbo engine (similar engine that powered the previous generations Vitz RS/Yaris T-Sport Turbo). This engine produces 112 kW (150 hp; 152 PS) at 6,000 rpm and 206 N⋅m (152 lb⋅ft; 21.0 kg⋅m) of torque at 4,000 rpm. Only 200 examples of the Vitz GRMN Turbo were made and only available for the local Japanese market.

The second variant was launched in September 2017. This version is powered by a Lotus-tuned, supercharged 1.8-litre 2ZR-FE engine (shared with the Series 3 Elise) that produces 156 kW (209 hp; 212 PS) at 6,800 rpm and 250 N⋅m (180 lb⋅ft; 25 kg⋅m) of torque at 5,000 rpm. It has a claimed 0–100 km/h (0–62 mph) acceleration in around 6.3 seconds and an electronically limited top speed of 230 km/h (143 mph). 150 units were built for Japan and 400 units were built for Europe. It was later succeeded by the mass-produced, four-wheel drive variant of the GR Yaris.

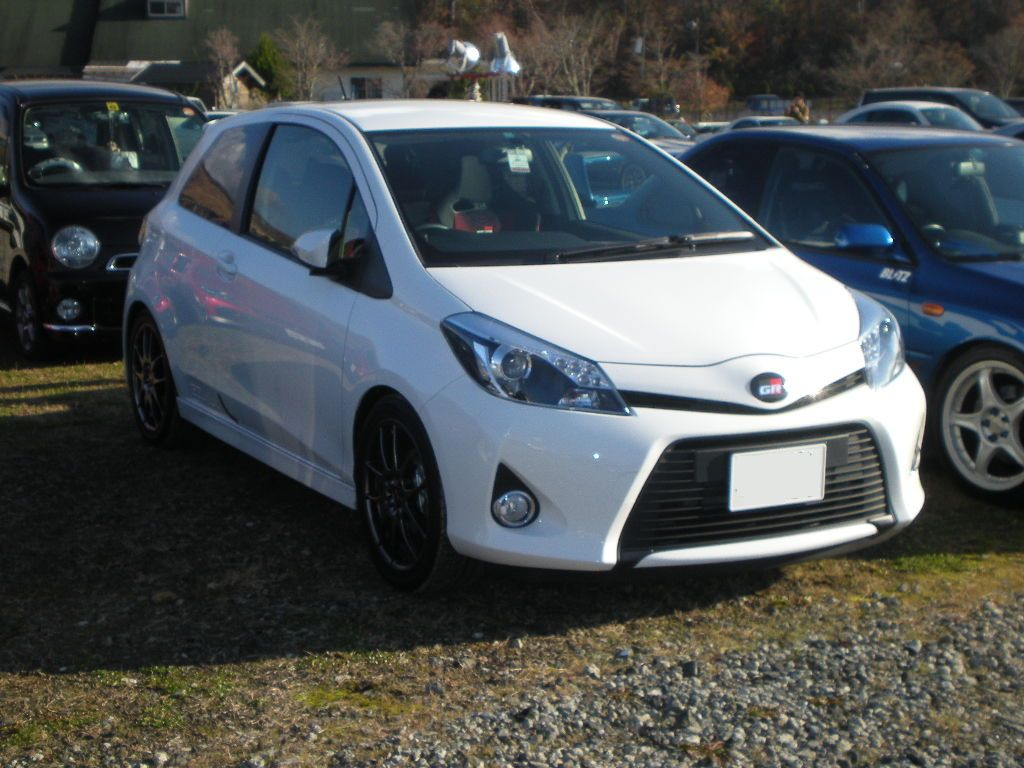
2013 Vitz GRMN Turbo (Japan)

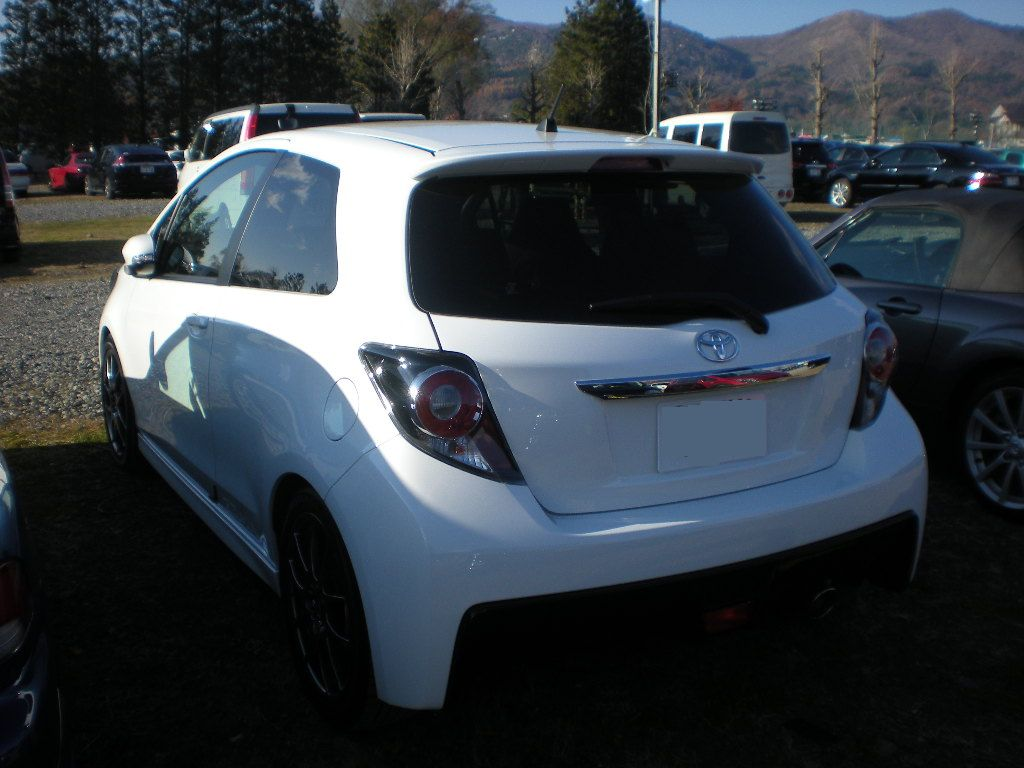
2013 Vitz GRMN Turbo (Japan)

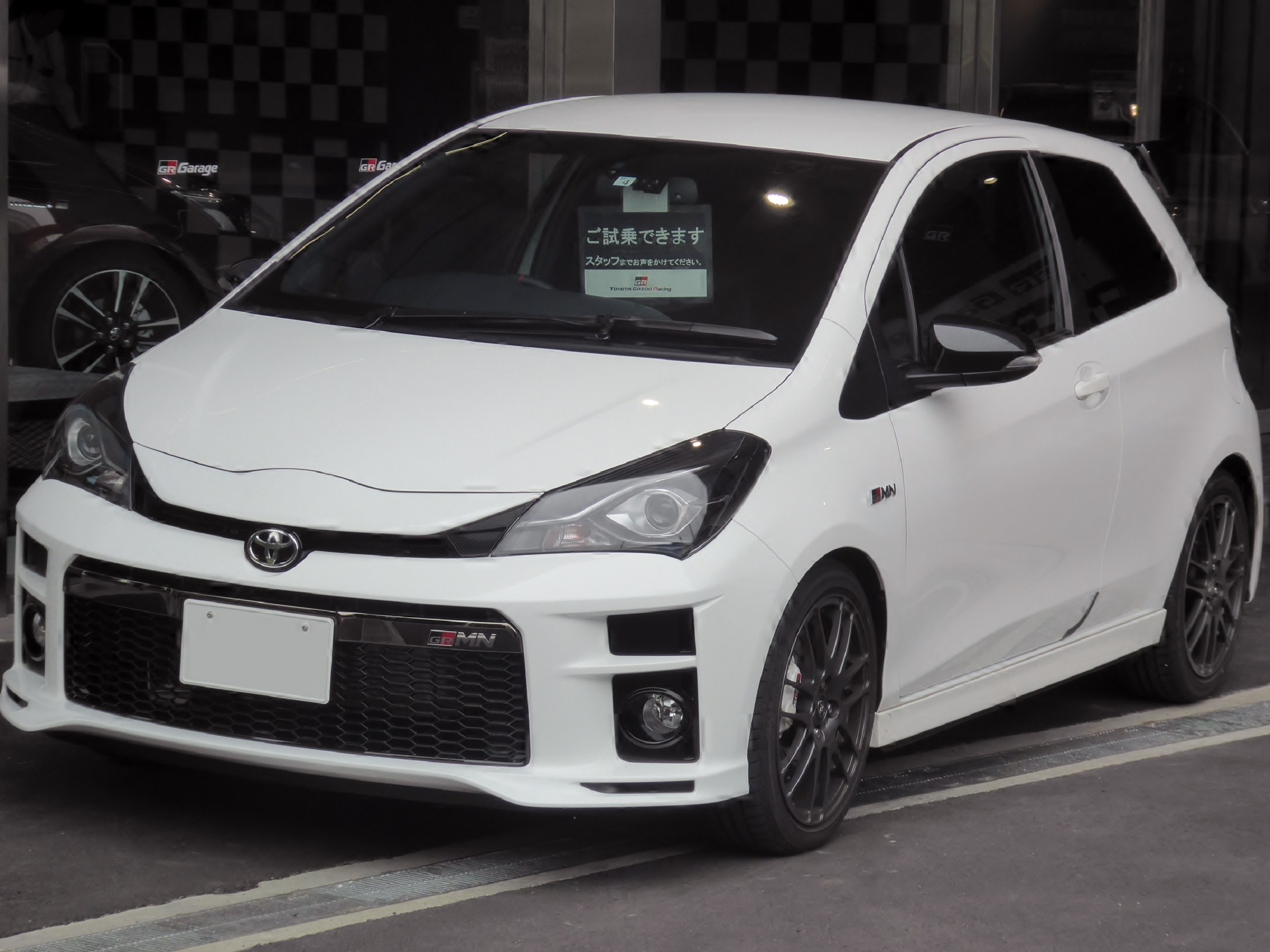
2018 Vitz GRMN (Japan)

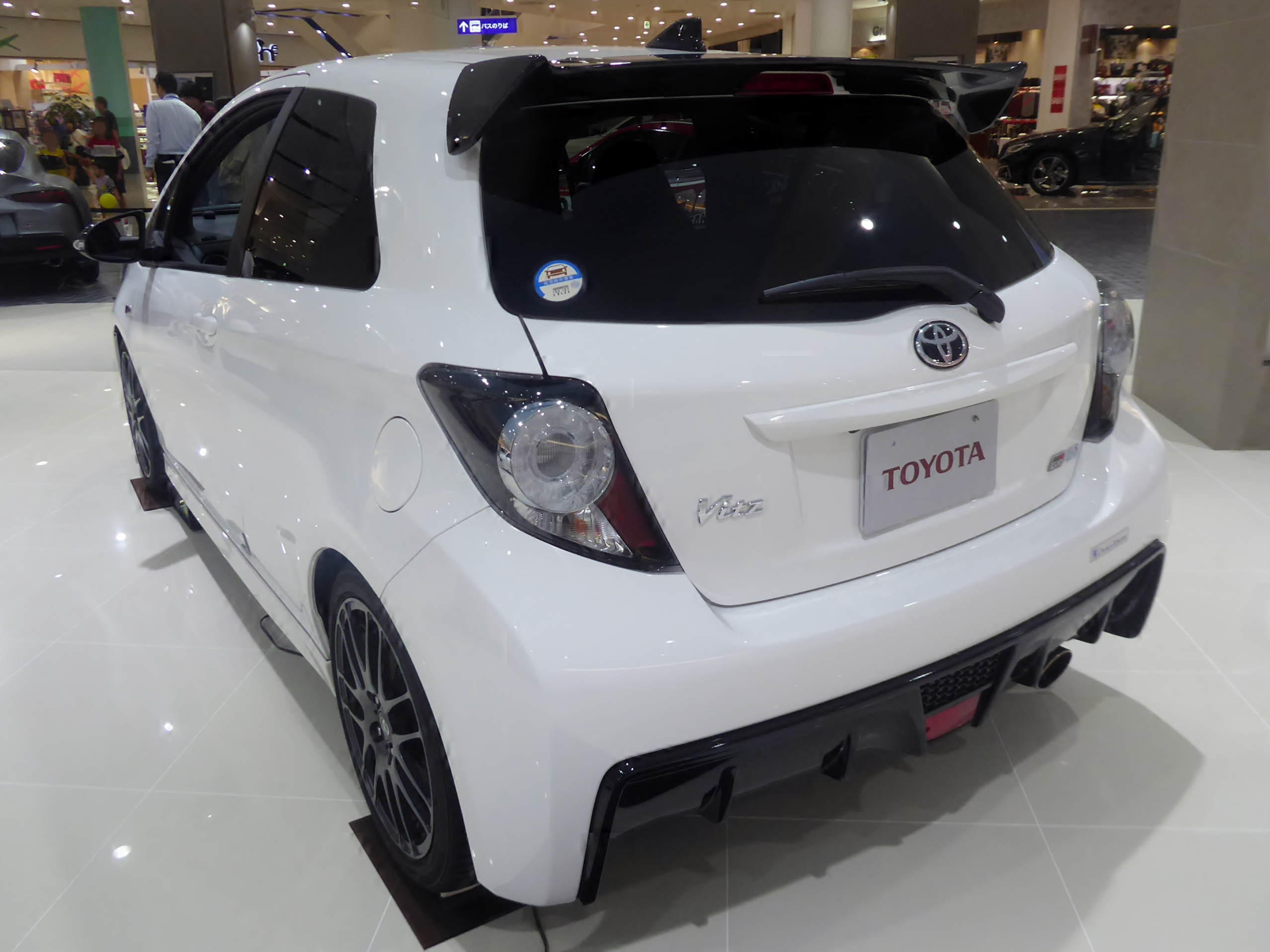
2018 Vitz GRMN (Japan)

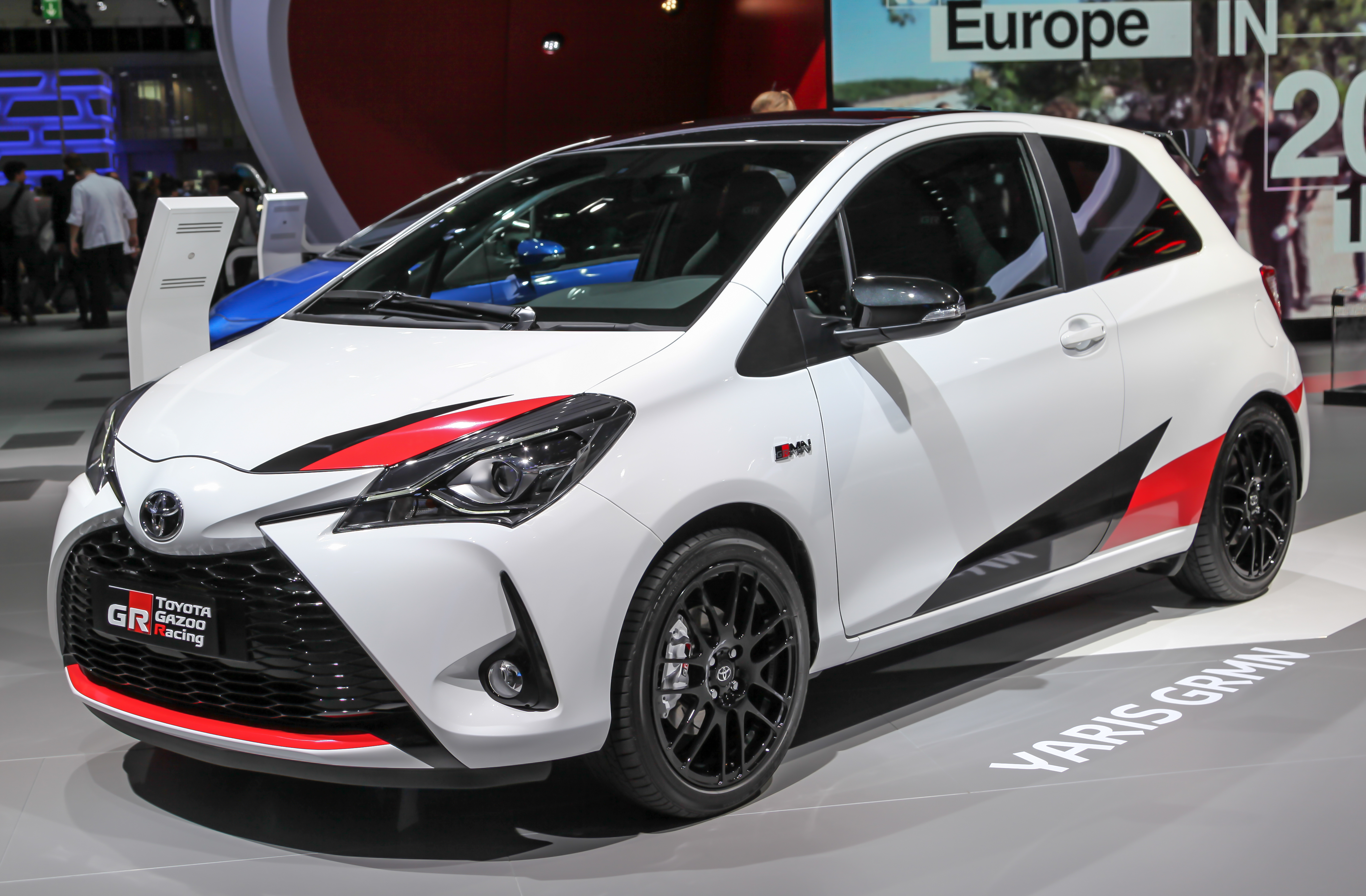
Yaris GRMN (Europe)

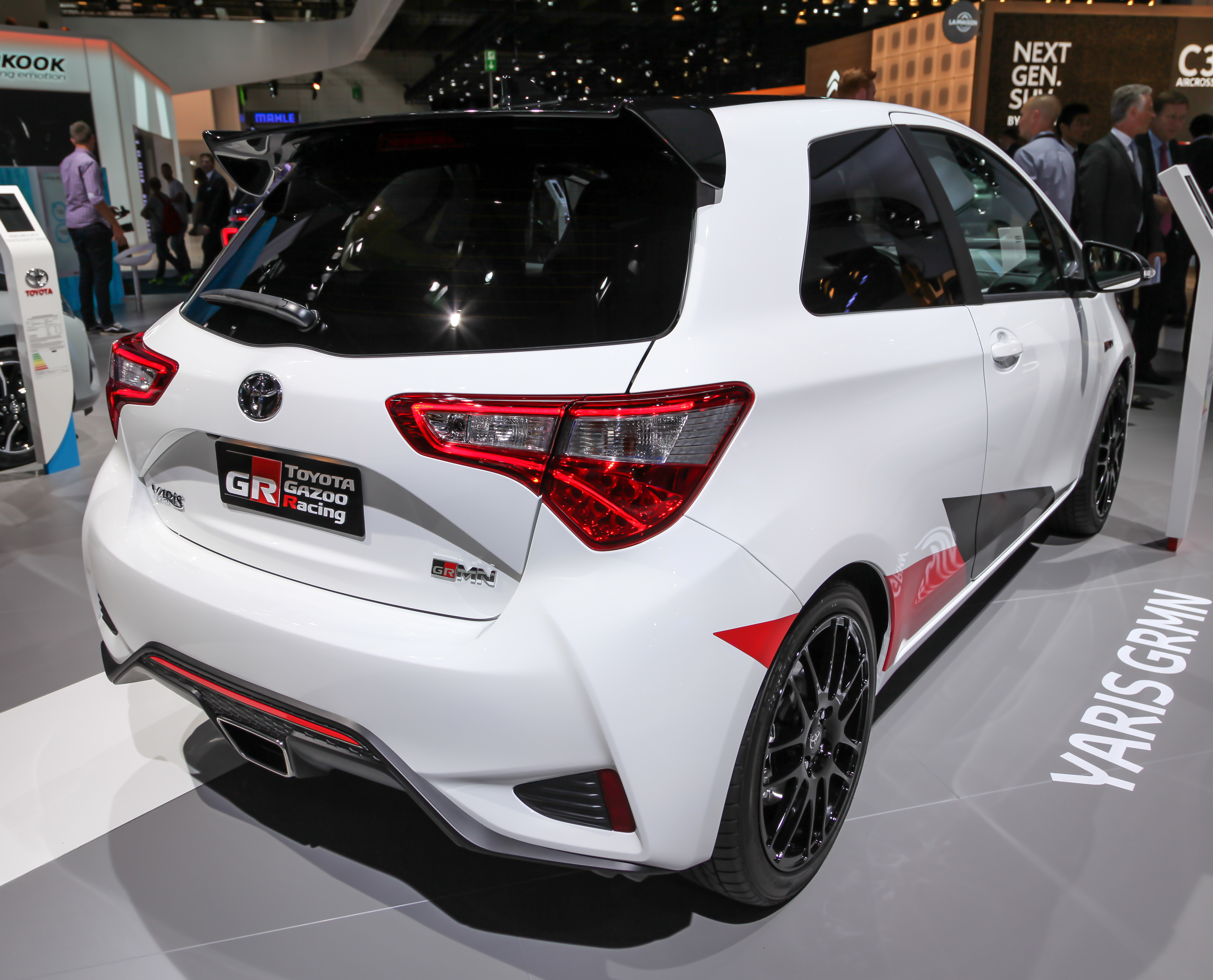
Yaris GRMN (Europe)

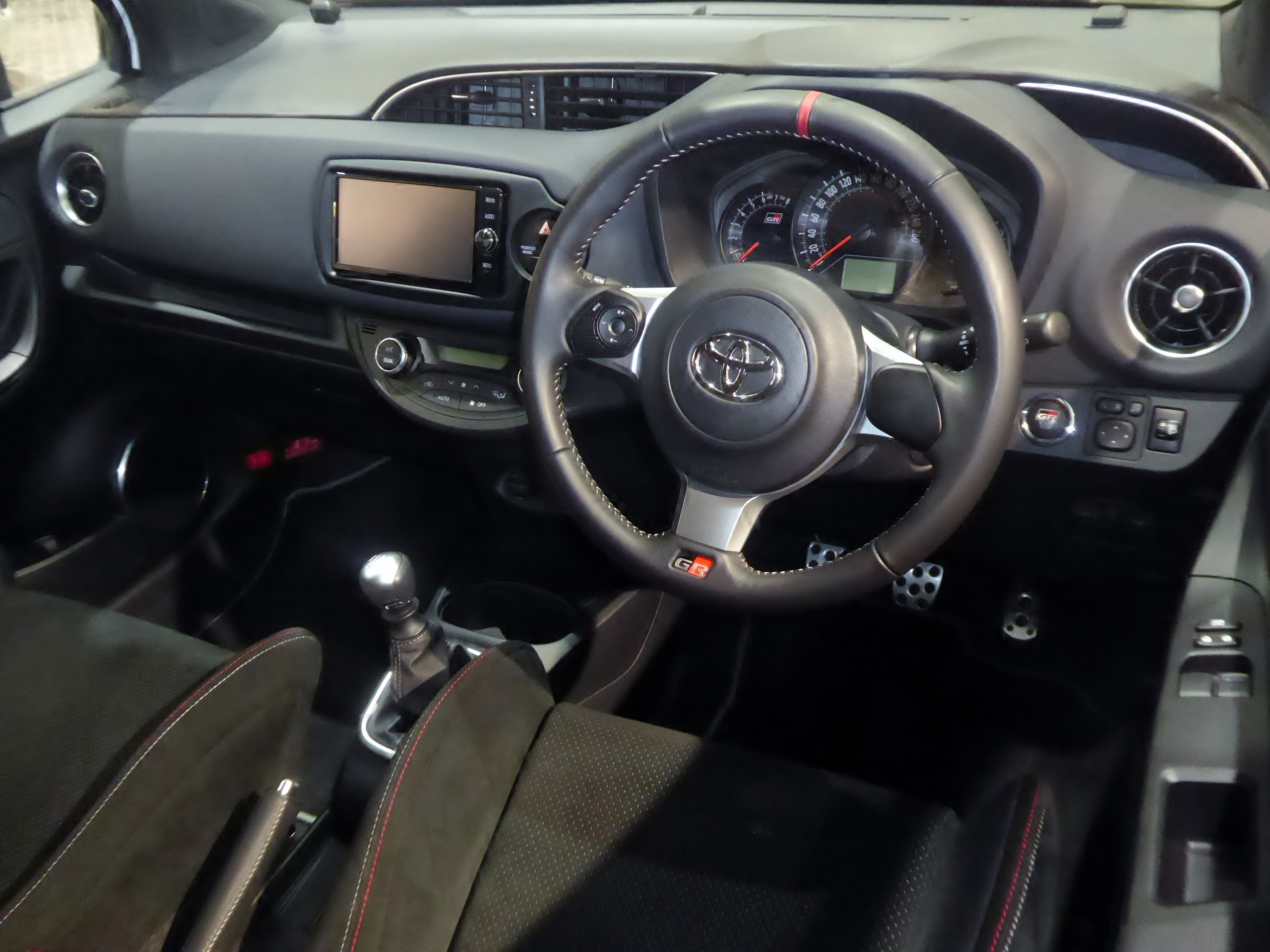
2018 Vitz GRMN interior

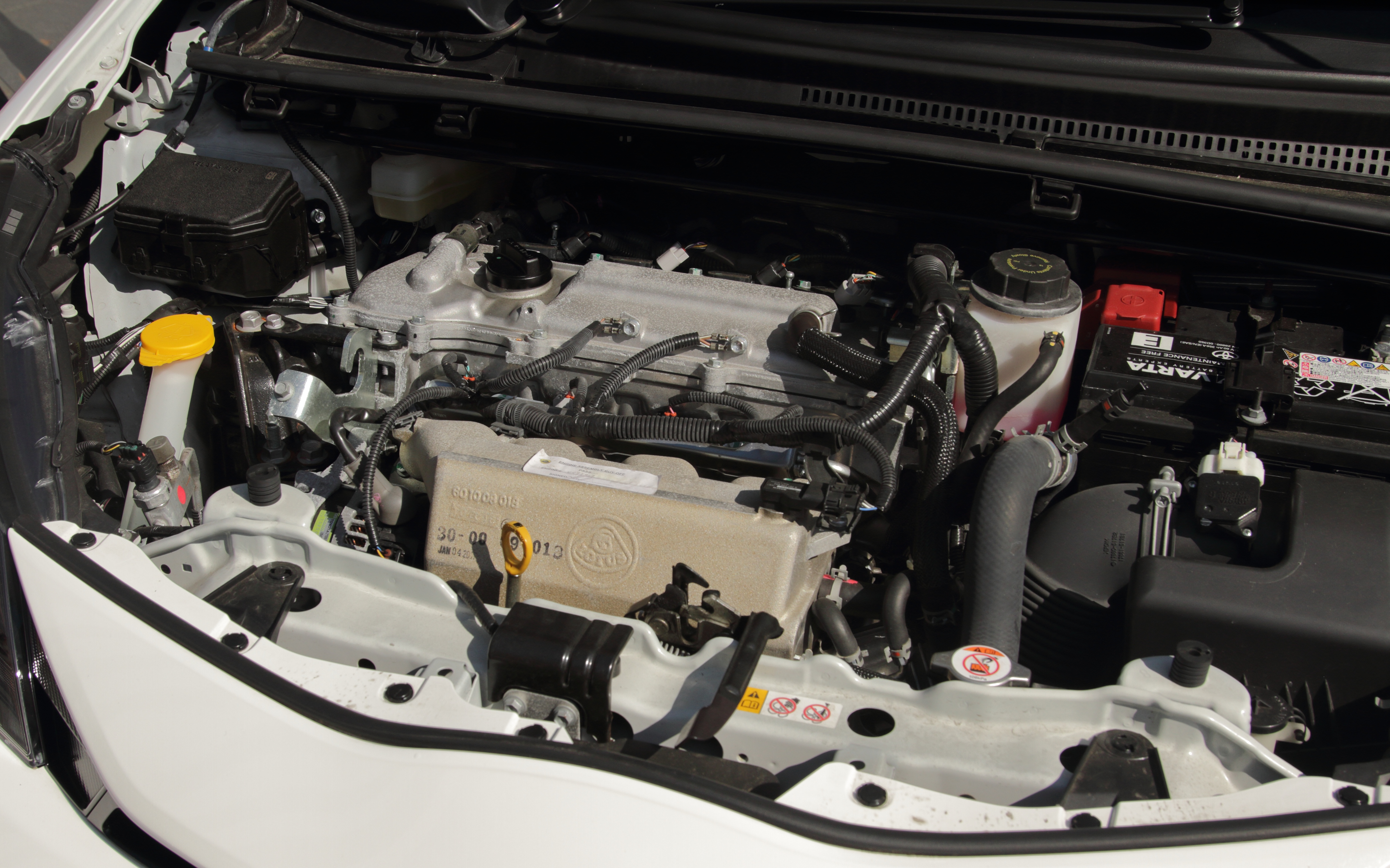
Supercharged 2ZR-FE engine in the Vitz GRMN

== Suzuki Celerio-based model ==
The "Vitz" nameplate was reused in 2023 for a rebadged third-generation Suzuki Celerio for African markets.

== Sales ==
Year	Japan
1999	156,646
2000	160,731
2001	142,513
2002	
2003	71,117
2004	60,788
2005	131,935
2006	117,641
2007	121,377
2008	123,337
2009	117,655
2010	122,248
2011	128,725
2012	105,611
2013	85,903
2014	89,496
2015	77,612
2016	71,909
2017	90,248
2018	87,299
2019	81,554

Preceded by Starlet	Toyota Vitz; 1999–2020	Succeeded by Yaris
