= 2024 New Zealand Rally Championship =

The 2024 New Zealand Rally Championship is the 47th running of the Championship, running equal amounts of events from the North Island to the South Island. Hayden Paddon is the defending Driver's Champion, but will not run the season opening Otago Rally due to Round One of the European Rally Championship clashing with Otago. Defending Co-Drivers champion John Kennard will step back from the NZ Rally Championship and will not defend his title in 2024. Kennard will continue to run alongside Paddon in the ERC, but young Co-Driver Jared Hudson will replace him in the 2024 season.

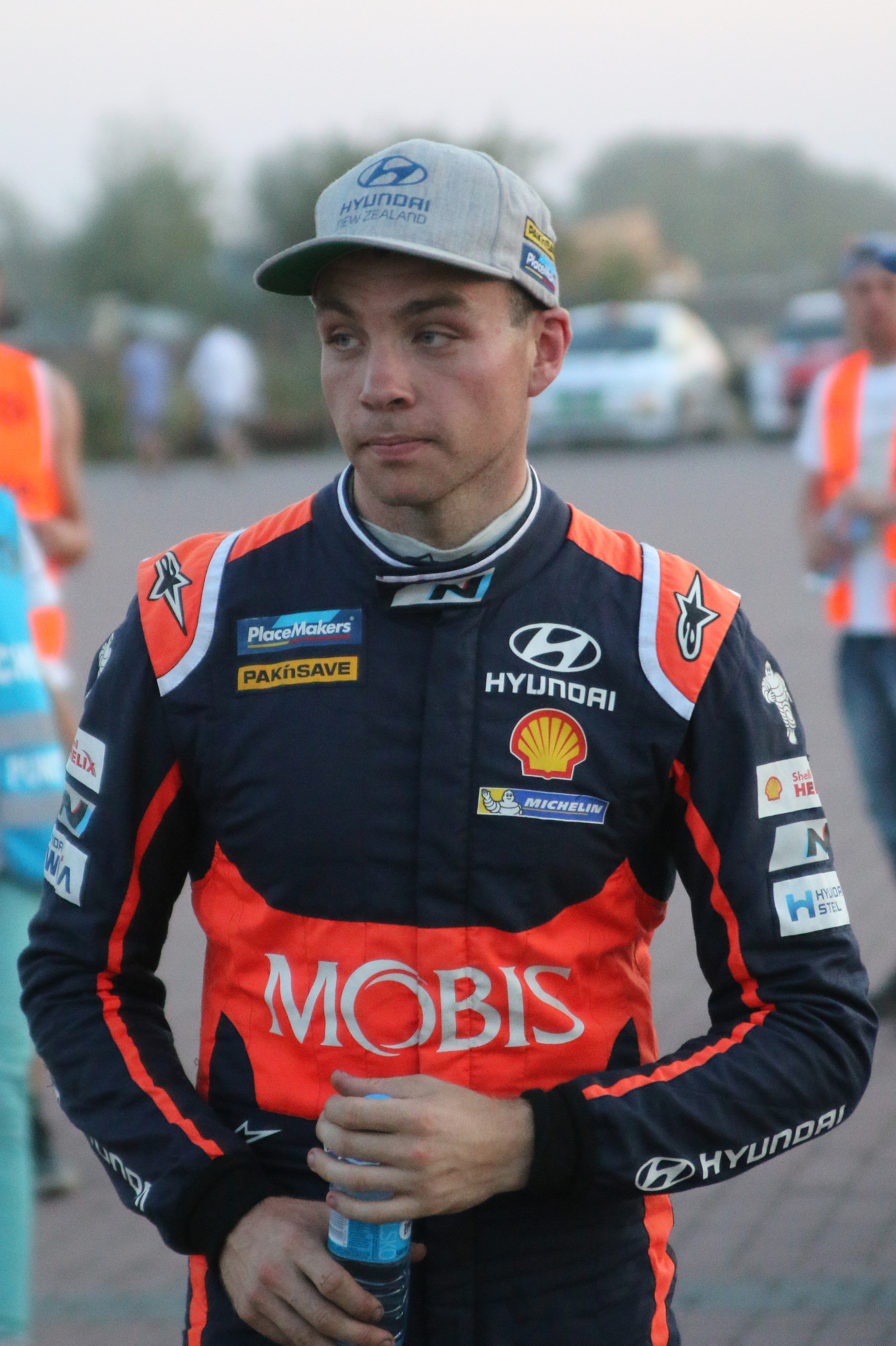
Hayden Paddon is the defending driver's champion.

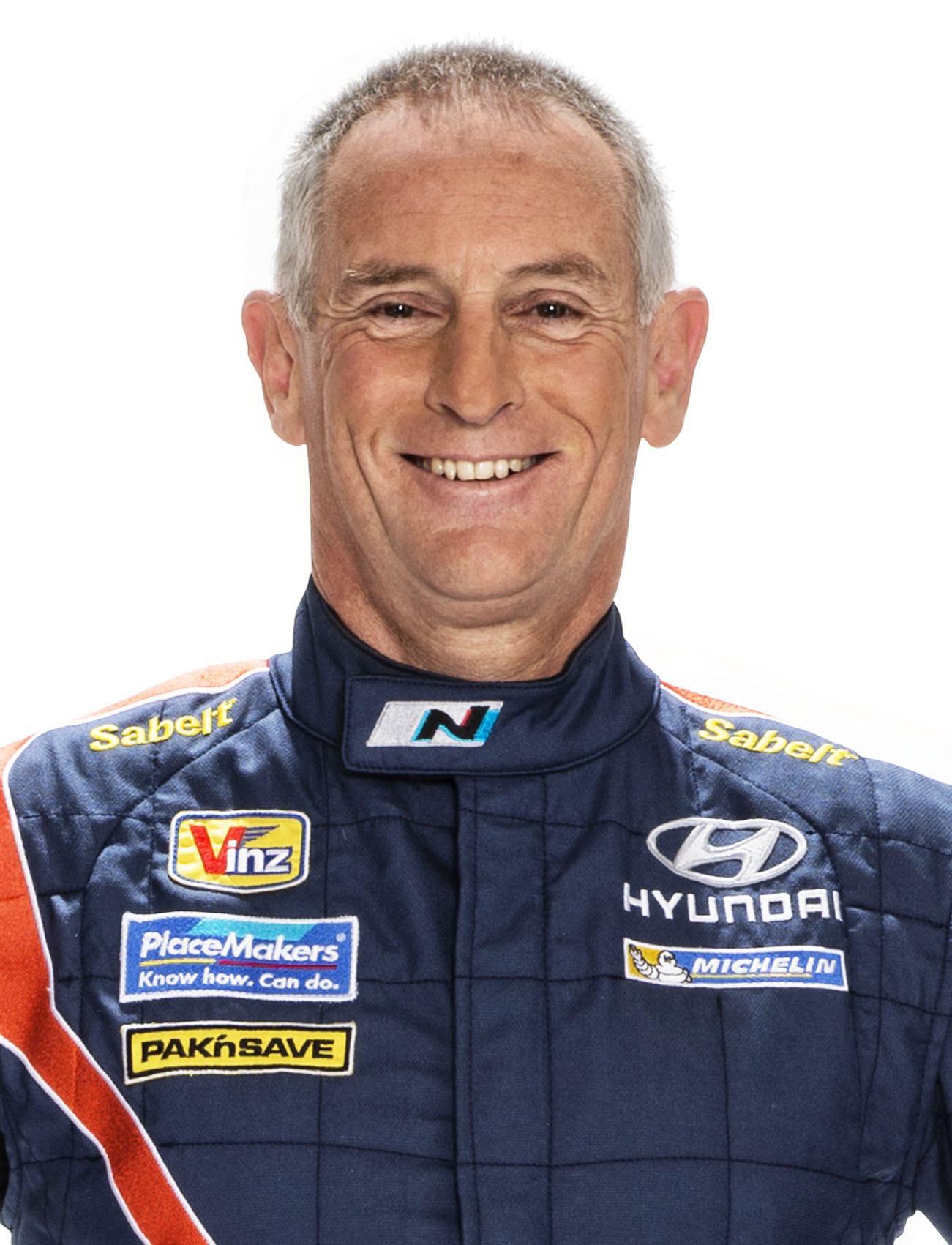
John Kennard won the co-driver's championship in 2023 but will not return to defend his title.

== Teams and Drivers ==
=== 4WD ===
Manufacturer	Model	Entrant	Tyre	Driver	Co-Driver	Rounds
Citroën	Citroën C3 Rally2	(New Zealand) Paddon Rallysport	MR	(New Zealand) Emma Gilmour	(New Zealand) Katrina Renshaw	1-2
Citroën	Citroën C3 Rally2	(New Zealand) Paddon Rallysport	MR	(New Zealand) Emma Gilmour	(United Kingdom) Malcolm Read	
Ford	Ford Fiesta AP4+	(New Zealand) Stokes Motorsport	MR	(New Zealand) Robbie Stokes	(New Zealand) Sarah Brennan	1-2
Ford	Ford Fiesta R5 MKII	(New Zealand) Team Online Racing	MR	(New Zealand) Todd Bawden	(New Zealand) Dave Neill	1
Hyundai	Hyundai i20 AP4+	(New Zealand) Paddon Rallysport	MR	(New Zealand) Hayden Paddon	(New Zealand) Jared Hudson	2
Hyundai	Hyundai i20 AP4+	(New Zealand) Paddon Rallysport	MR	(Australia) Brendan Reeves	(New Zealand) Amy Hudson	
Hyundai	Hyundai i20 N Rally2	(New Zealand) Paddon Rallysport	MR	(New Zealand) Hayden Paddon	(New Zealand) Jared Hudson	
Mazda	Mazda 2 AP4+	(Vanuatu) Nelson Law	MR	(Vanuatu) Nelson Law	(Vanuatu) Antonio Korikalo	1
Mitsubishi	Mitsubishi Mirage AP4+	(New Zealand) Paddon Rallysport	MR	(Australia) Stewart Reid	(New Zealand) Bella Haggarty	1-2
Mitsubishi	Mitsubishi Mirage AP4+	(France) Eugene Creugnet	MR	(France) Eugene Creugnet	(France) Philippe Delrieu	1-2
Skoda	Škoda Fabia Rally2 evo	(New Zealand) Ben Hunt Motorsport	MR	(New Zealand) Ben Hunt	(New Zealand) Tony Rawstorn	1-2
Skoda	Skoda Fabia R5	(New Zealand) Zeal Jones Racing	MR	(New Zealand) Zeal Jones	(New Zealand) Waverley Jones	1-2
Toyota	Toyota GR Yaris AP4+	Toyota Gazoo Racing New Zealand	MR	(New Zealand) Jack Hawkeswood	(New Zealand) Jason Farmer	1-2
Toyota	Toyota Yaris AP4+	(New Zealand) SAS Motorsport	MR	(New Zealand) Mike Young	(New Zealand) Amy Hudson	1
Volkswagen	Volkswagen Polo R5	(New Zealand) Carbon Works Rally Team	MR	(New Zealand) Andy Martin	(New Zealand) Rocky Hudson	1-2

=== 2WD ===
==== FIA Group N ====
Manufacturer	Model	Entrant	Tyre	Driver	Co-Driver	Rounds
Ford	Ford Fiesta Rally4	(New Zealand) Dylan Thomson RallySport	MR	(New Zealand) Dylan Thomson	(New Zealand) Bayden Thomson	1-2
Ford	Ford Fiesta Rally4	(Wales) Jones Motorsport	MR	(New Zealand) Bryn Jones	(New Zealand) Sean Lockyear	1-2
Ford	Ford Fiesta Rally4	(New Zealand) Tim Mackersy	MR	(New Zealand) Tim Mackersy	(New Zealand) Lauren Mackersy	
Ford	Ford Fiesta R2	(New Zealand) Tim Mackersy	MR	(New Zealand) Tim Mackersy	(New Zealand) Lauren Mackersy	1-2
Ford	Ford Fiesta R2	(New Zealand) Jack Stokes	MR	(New Zealand) Jack Stokes	(New Zealand) Sarah Faulkner	1-2
Ford	Ford Fiesta R2	(New Zealand) James Worker	MR	(New Zealand) James Worker	(New Zealand) Mags Marshall	1-2

==== Open 2WD ====
Manufacturer	Model	Entrant	Tyre	Driver	Co-Driver	Rounds
Honda	Honda Jazz RS	(New Zealand) Strong Motorsport	MR	(New Zealand) David Strong	(New Zealand) Rob Scott	1
Honda	Honda Jazz RS	(New Zealand) Strong Motorsport	MR	(New Zealand) David Strong	(New Zealand) Carol Liston	2
Toyota	Toyota Corolla	(New Zealand) Willy Hawes	MR	(New Zealand) Willy Hawes	(New Zealand) Jason Dwyer	1-2
Toyota	Toyota RC86	(New Zealand) Ramsay Motorsport	MR	(New Zealand) Brent Taylor	(New Zealand) Chris Ramsay	1

==== Historic ====
Manufacturer	Model	Entrant	Tyre	Driver	Co-Driver	Rounds
Ford	Ford Escort RS 1800	(New Zealand) Paul Fraser	MR	(New Zealand) Paul Fraser	(New Zealand) Brody Cattermole	1-2
Mitsubishi	Mitsubishi Lancer	(New Zealand) Mike Cameron	MR	(New Zealand) Mike Cameron	(New Zealand) Helen Cameron	1-2

=== Rally Challenge ===
==== 4WD ====
Manufacturer	Model	Entrant	Tyre	Driver	Co-Driver	Rounds
Mitsubishi	Mitsubishi Lancer Evo III	(New Zealand) Andrew Graves	{{}}	(New Zealand) Andrew Graves	(New Zealand) Hayden Graves	1-2
Mitsubishi	Mitsubishi Lancer Evo VI	(New Zealand) Caleb MacDonald	{{}}	(New Zealand) Caleb MacDonald	(Australia) Larissa Biggar	1-2
Mitsubishi	Mitsubishi Lancer Evo IX	Team Ralliart New Zealand	{{}}	(New Zealand) Brian Green	(New Zealand) Brianna Little	1-2
Mitsubishi	Mitsubishi Lancer Evo X	(New Zealand) Carter Strang	{{}}	(New Zealand) Carter Strang	(New Zealand) Catriona Flynn	1-2
Subaru	Subaru Impreza H6	(Canada) Brandon Semenuk	{{}}	(Canada) Brandon Semenuk	(United Kingdom) Keaton Williams	1
Subaru	Subaru Impreza H6	(New Zealand) Paul Cross	{{}}	(New Zealand) Paul Cross	(New Zealand) Janey Blair	1-2
Subaru	Subaru Impreza H6	(New Zealand) Magnum Motorsport	{{}}	(New Zealand) Amy Keighley	(New Zealand) Grant Marra	1-2
Subaru	Subaru Impreza WRX	(New Zealand) James MacDonald	{{}}	(New Zealand) James MacDonald	(New Zealand) Josh Edwards	1-2
Subaru	Subaru Impreza WRX	(New Zealand) Jay Pittams	{{}}	(New Zealand) Jay Pittams	(New Zealand) John Paul van der Mays	1-2
Subaru	Subaru Impreza WRX	(New Zealand) Dave Ollis	{{}}	(New Zealand) Dave Ollis	(New Zealand) Gemma Thomas	1
Subaru	Subaru Impreza WRX STI	(Vanuatu) Julian Lenglet	{{}}	(Vanuatu) Julian Lenglet	(New Zealand) Ben Huban	1
Subaru	Subaru Impreza WRX STI	(New Zealand) Mark McMillan	{{}}	(New Zealand) Mark McMillan	(New Zealand) Tim Driscoll	1
Subaru	Subaru Impreza WRX STI	(New Zealand) Gavin Feast	{{}}	(New Zealand) Gavin Feast	(New Zealand) Matt Hayward	1

==== 2WD ====
Manufacturer	Model	Entrant	Tyre	Driver	Co-Driver	Rounds
Ford	Ford Escort Mk2	(New Zealand) Daniel Haines	MR	(New Zealand) Daniel Haines	(New Zealand) Matt Priest	1
Toyota	Toyota Corolla 1600	(New Zealand) Jared Parker	MR	(New Zealand) Jared Parker	(New Zealand) Kyle Shears	1

==== Teams Entries ====
===== Category 1–4 =====
Team Name	Car	Tyre	Drivers	Co-Drivers	Cat	Rounds
(New Zealand) Paddon Rallysport	Hyundai i20 AP4+	MR	(New Zealand) Hayden Paddon	(New Zealand) Jared Hudson	1	2-6
(New Zealand) Paddon Rallysport	Citroën C3 Rally2	MR	(New Zealand) Emma Gilmour	(New Zealand) Katrina Renshaw	1	2-6
(New Zealand) Skoda NZ Rally Team	Skoda Fabia R5	MR	(New Zealand) Ben Hunt	(New Zealand) Tony Rawstorn	1	1-6
(New Zealand) Skoda NZ Rally Team	Skoda Fabia R5	MR	(New Zealand) Zeal Jones	(New Zealand) Waverley Jones	1	1-6
(New Zealand) Stokes Motorsport	Ford Fiesta AP4+	MR	(New Zealand) Robbie Stokes	(Scotland) Ally Mackay	1	1-6
(New Zealand) Stokes Motorsport	Ford Fiesta R2	MR	(New Zealand) Jack Stokes	(New Zealand) Sarah Faulkner	2	1-6
(New Zealand) Team SACC	Toyota GR Yaris AP4+	MR	(New Zealand) Jack Hawkeswood	(New Zealand) Jason Farmer	1	1-3, 6
(New Zealand) Team SACC	Honda Jazz RS	MR	(New Zealand) David Strong	(New Zealand) Rob Scott	3	2-6
(New Zealand) Rally4Play	Ford Fiesta Rally4	MR	(New Zealand) Dylan Thomson	(New Zealand) Bayden Thomson	2	1-6
(New Zealand) Rally4Play	Ford Fiesta Rally4	MR	(New Zealand) Bryn Jones	(New Zealand) Sean Lockyear	2	1-6
(Australia) Mitsi Gold	Mitsubishi Mirage AP4+	MR	(Australia) Stewart Reid	(New Zealand) Bella Haggarty	1	1-6
(Australia) Mitsi Gold	Mitsubishi Lancer	MR	(New Zealand) Mike Cameron	(New Zealand) Helen Cameron	4	1-6
(New Zealand) Southerners	Ford Fiesta R2	MR	(New Zealand) James Worker	(New Zealand) Mags Marshall	2	1-2
(New Zealand) Southerners	Ford Fiesta R2/ Ford Fiesta Rally4	MR	(New Zealand) Tim Mackersy	(New Zealand) Lauren Mackersy	2	1-6

== Calendar ==
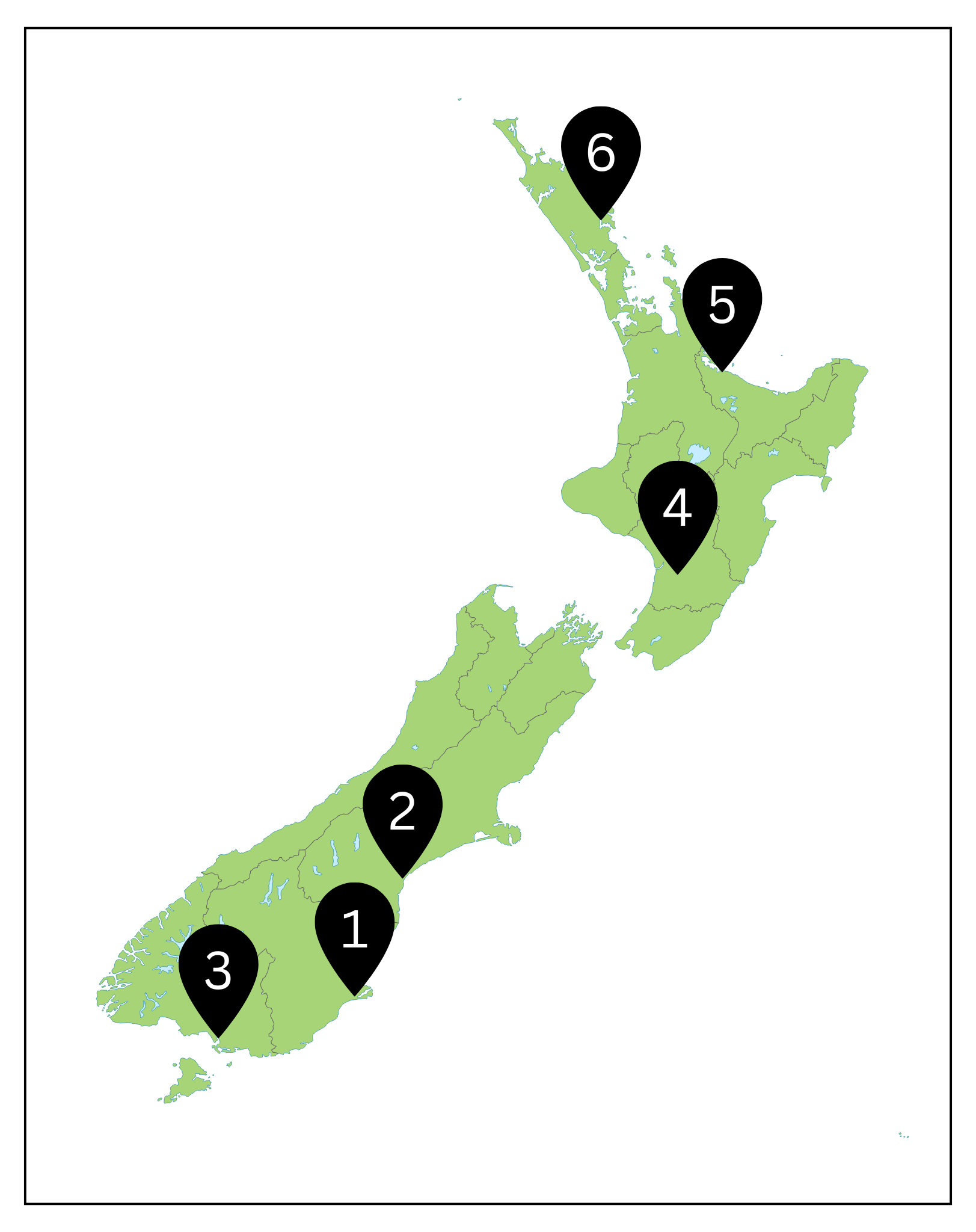
2024 NZRC Rounds Map

The 2024 season is scheduled to be contested over six rounds, three in the North Island and three in the South Island.

Round	Start date	Finish date	Rally	Rally headquarters	Surface	Stages	Distance	Map
1	12 April	14 April	(New Zealand) Central Machine Hire Otago Rally	Dunedin	Gravel	16	277.05 km	
2	11 May	11 May	(New Zealand) South Canterbury Hydraulics Rally South Canterbury	Timaru	Gravel	8	150.67 km	
3	21 June	22 June	(New Zealand) Southern Lights Rally	Invercargill	Gravel	TBA	TBA km	
4	14 September	14 September	(New Zealand) Daybreaker Rally	Feilding	Gravel	TBA	TBA km	
5	5 October	5 October	(New Zealand) Battery Town Rally Bay of Plenty	Tauranga	Gravel	TBA	TBA km	
6	8 November	10 November	(New Zealand) International Rally of Whangarei	Whangārei	Gravel	TBA	TBA km	

== Results ==
=== Summary ===
==== Overall ====
Round	Event	Winning driver	Winning Co-Driver	Winning team	Winning car	Ref.
1	(New Zealand) Otago Rally	(New Zealand) Jack Hawkeswood	(New Zealand) Jason Farmer	Toyota Gazoo Racing New Zealand	(Japan) Toyota GR Yaris AP4+	
2	(New Zealand) South Canterbury Rally	(New Zealand) Hayden Paddon	(New Zealand) Jared Hudson	(New Zealand) Paddon Rallysport	(South Korea) Hyundai i20 AP4+	
3	(New Zealand) Southern Lights Rally	(New Zealand) Hayden Paddon	(New Zealand) Jared Hudson	(New Zealand) Paddon Rallysport	(South Korea) Hyundai i20 AP4+	
4	(New Zealand) Day Breaker Rally	(New Zealand) Hayden Paddon	(New Zealand) Jared Hudson	(New Zealand) Paddon Rallysport	(South Korea) Hyundai i20 AP4+	
5	(New Zealand) Rally Bay of Plenty	(New Zealand) Hayden Paddon	(New Zealand) Jared Hudson	(New Zealand) Paddon Rallysport	(South Korea) Hyundai i20 AP4+	
6	(New Zealand) Rally of Whangarei	(New Zealand) Hayden Paddon	(New Zealand) Jared Hudson	(New Zealand) Paddon Rallysport	(South Korea) Hyundai i20 AP4+	

=== Points ===
==== Points System ====
Points Format	Position																			
Points Format	1st	2nd	3rd	4th	5th	6th	7th	8th	9th	10th	11th	12th	13th	14th	15th	16th	17th	18th	19th	20th
Championship	25	22	20	19	18	17	16	15	14	13	12	11	10	9	8	7	6	5	4	3
Day Points	7	5	3	2	1															
Power Stage	5	4	3	2	1															

=== Overall ===
==== Drivers ====
Pos.	Driver Name	(New Zealand) OTA			(New Zealand) SCA	(New Zealand) SOU			(New Zealand) DAY	(New Zealand) BAY	(New Zealand) WHA			Points
Pos.	Driver Name	L1	L2	Rd	Rd	L1	L2	Rd	Rd	Rd	L1	L2	Rd	Points
1	(New Zealand) Ben Hunt	3	1	3 ^{1}										168
2	(New Zealand) Hayden Paddon													164
3	(New Zealand) Emma Gilmour		4	4 ^{4}										126
4	(New Zealand) Dylan Thomson			8										109
5=	(Japan) Zeal Jones	4		5										105
5=	(New Zealand) Robbie Stokes	2	2	2 ^{2}										105
7	(New Zealand) Jack Stokes			9										71
8	(New Zealand) William Hawes			18										68
9	(New Zealand) Tim MacKersy			14										65
10	(New Zealand) Jack Hawkswood	1	3	1 ^{3}										63
11	(New Zealand) Dave Strong													60
12	(New Zealand) Paul Fraser													58
13=	(Australia) Stewart Reid				5									53
13=	(New Zealand) Bryn Jones													53
15	(New Zealand) Mike Cameron													42

==== Co-Drivers ====
Pos.	Driver Name	(New Zealand) OTA			(New Zealand) SCA	(New Zealand) SOU			(New Zealand) DAY	(New Zealand) BAY	(New Zealand) WHA			Points
Pos.	Driver Name	L1	L2	Rd	Rd	L1	L2	Rd	Rd	Rd	L1	L2	Rd	Points
1	(New Zealand) Jason Farmer	1	3	1 ^{3}										38
2	(New Zealand) Sarah Brennan	2	2	2 ^{2}										36
3	(New Zealand) Tony Rawstorn	3	1	3 ^{1}										35
4	(New Zealand) Katrina Renshaw		4	4 ^{4}										23
5	(New Zealand) Waverley Jones	4		5										20
6	(New Zealand) Bayden Thomson		5	6 ^{5}										19
7	(New Zealand) Sarah Faulkner			7										16
8	(New Zealand) Lauren MacKersy			8										15
9	(New Zealand) Mags Marshall			9										14
10	(New Zealand) Jason Dwyer			10										13
11	(New Zealand) Brody Cattermole			11										12
12	(New Zealand) Helen Cameron			12										11
13	(Australia) Bella Haggarty	5												1

- Championship: Awarded for Top 20 Overall / Class
- Day Points: Awarded for Top 5 overall for each day. (Otago / Whangarei)
- Power Stage: Awarded for Top 5 fastest on the Power Stage (Overall & Class)
