= 2026 New Zealand Rally Championship =

The 2026 New Zealand Rally Championship is the 49th running of the Championship, running equal amounts of events from the North Island to the South Island.

The 2026 championship will start in the South Island, opening with the Otago Rally in April, followed by Canterbury Rally in May, and Southland Rally in July. Crews will then contest the 2nd half of the 2026 championship in the North Island, starting with Hawkes Bay Rally in August, the Rally of Whangarei in September, and the championship will finish in October at the Bay of Plenty Rally.

Ben Hunt is the defending Driver's Champion, but will only contest a part-time champaign in 2026. Defending Co-Drivers champion Tony Rawstron will also only contest a part-time champaign in 2026.

The championship introduces a new class in 2026, titled Category 6. Category 6 is for 2wd classic rally cars, following the same rules as the classic division of the Otago Rally.

The 2026 New Zealand Rally Championship championship was won by Jack Hawkeswood and Jason Farmer at the penultimute round held at the Rally of Whangarei. It is Jack's first NZRC win, and Jason's second NZRC win.

== Teams and Drivers ==
=== Overall ===
==== Category 1 (4WD) ====
Entrant	Model	Tyre	Driver	Co-Driver	Rounds
(New Zealand) Stokes Motorsport	Škoda Fabia Rally2 evo	M	(New Zealand) Robbie Stokes	(Australia) Andy Sarandis	1-2
(New Zealand) Stokes Motorsport	Škoda Fabia Rally2 evo	M	(New Zealand) Robbie Stokes	(Scotland) Ally Mackay	3-5
(New Zealand) Stokes Motorsport	Škoda Fabia Rally2 evo	M	(New Zealand) Jack Stokes	(New Zealand) Hayden Graves	1-5
(New Zealand) Dylan Thomson Rallysport	Škoda Fabia Rally2 evo	M	(New Zealand) Dylan Thomson	(New Zealand) Bayden Thomson	1
(New Zealand) Quentin Palmer Rallysport	Škoda Fabia Rally2 evo	M	(New Zealand) Quentin Palmer	(Republic of Ireland) Noel Moloney	1
(New Zealand) Quentin Palmer Rallysport	Škoda Fabia Rally2 evo	M	(New Zealand) Quentin Palmer	(New Zealand) Michael Goudie	2-6
(Vanuatu) Pierre Brunet Racing	Skoda Fabia RS Rally2	M	(Vanuatu) Pierre-Henri Brunet	(New Zealand) Sean Lockyear	1-2, 5-6
(New Zealand) Force Motorsport	Toyota GR Yaris Rally2	M	(New Zealand) Jack Hawkeswood	(New Zealand) Jason Farmer	1-6
(New Zealand) Force Motorsport	Toyota GR Yaris Cup	M	(Australia) Toby Price	(Australia) Larisa Biggar	1
(New Zealand) Force Motorsport	Toyota GR Yaris Cup	M	(Australia) Toby Price	(Australia) Ben Searcy	4
(New Zealand) Force Motorsport	Toyota GR Yaris Cup	M	(New Zealand) Ben Hunt	(New Zealand) Tony Rawstron	3
(New Zealand) Force Motorsport	Mazda 2 AP4	M	(New Zealand) Ben Hunt	(New Zealand) Tony Rawstron	5
(Vanuatu) Nelson Law Racing	Toyota Yaris AP4+	M	(Vanuatu) Nelson Law	(Vanuatu) Antonio Korikalo	1-2, 4
(New Zealand) William Menzies Motorsport	Toyota GR Yaris Cup	M	(New Zealand) William Menzies	(New Zealand) Dolan Doug	4, 6
(New Zealand) Carter Strang	Toyota GR Yaris Cup	M	(New Zealand) Carter Strang	(New Zealand) Kingsley Jones	3
(New Zealand) Carter Strang	Toyota GR Yaris Cup	M	(New Zealand) Carter Strang	(New Zealand) Jason Robb	6
(New Zealand) Duncan McCrostie	Volkswagen Polo R5	M	(New Zealand) Duncan McCrostie	(New Zealand) Greg Fitzgerald	1

==== Category 2 (FIA 2WD) ====
Entrant	Model	Tyre	Driver	Co-Driver	Rounds
(Japan) Fuyuhiko Takahashi	Ford Fiesta Rally4	M	(Japan) Fuyuhiko Takahashi	(Japan) Ken Takahashi	1, 5
(Japan) Fuyuhiko Takahashi	Ford Fiesta Rally4	M	(Japan) Fuyuhiko Takahashi	(Japan) Isao Kono	6
(New Zealand) Jackson Clendon Motorsport	Ford Fiesta Rally4	M	(New Zealand) Jackson Clendon	(New Zealand) Sean Lockyear	4
(New Zealand) Jackson Clendon Motorsport	Ford Fiesta Rally4	M	(New Zealand) Jackson Clendon	(Australia) Larisa Biggar	6
(New Zealand) Mackersy Motorsport	Suzuki Swift Sport Cup	M	(Spain) Edgar Vigo Lopez	(Spain) Fatima Ameneiro	1

==== Category 3 (OPEN 2WD) ====
Entrant	Model	Tyre	Driver	Co-Driver	Rounds
(New Zealand) Strong Motorsport	Honda Jazz RS	M	(New Zealand) Dave Strong	(New Zealand) Rob Scott	1-5-6
(New Zealand) Ari Pettigrew	Porsche 911 WRC	M	(New Zealand) Ari Pettigrew	(New Zealand) Jack Norris	1-3, 5
(New Zealand) Paddon Rallysport	Porsche 991 GT3	M	(New Zealand) Andy Martin	(New Zealand) Matt Hayward	3
(New Zealand) Mackersy Motorsport	Ford Fiesta Rally4	M	(New Zealand) Tim Mackersy	(New Zealand) Lauren Mackersy	1-3, 5
(New Zealand) Stumpy Holmes	Ford Escort MkII	M	(New Zealand) Stumpy Holmes	(New Zealand) Kevin Vince	1

==== Category 4 (Historic) ====
Entrant	Model	Tyre	Driver	Co-Driver	Rounds
(New Zealand) Pat Norris	Toyota Corolla AE86	M	(New Zealand) Pat Norris	(New Zealand) Geoff Parr	1, 5
(New Zealand) Pat Norris	Toyota Corolla AE86	M	(New Zealand) Pat Norris	(New Zealand) Kevin Cooke	3
(New Zealand) Pat Norris	Toyota Corolla AE86	M	(New Zealand) Pat Norris	(Australia) Veronica Penny	4
(New Zealand) Mike Cameron	Mitsubishi Lancer	M	(New Zealand) Mike Cameron	(New Zealand) Helen Cameron	1, 6
(New Zealand) Mike Cameron	Mitsubishi EX Lancer	M	(New Zealand) Mike Cameron	(New Zealand) Kelly Carson	2, 4-5
(New Zealand) Phil Macquarie	Ford Escort RS1800 MkII	M	(New Zealand) Phil Macquarie	(New Zealand) Andrew Brooks	1-2, 4-6
(New Zealand) Mark Parsons	Triumph TR7 V8	M	(New Zealand) Mark Parsons	(New Zealand) Mal Clark	1

==== Category 6C (Classic 6C) ====
Entrant	Model	Tyre	Driver	Co-Driver	Rounds
(New Zealand) Harding Motorsport	Mazda RX-7	M	(New Zealand) Ben Harding	(New Zealand) Charlotte Harding	1-6
(New Zealand) Harding Motorsport	Ford Escort MkII BDA	M	(New Zealand) Roger McKay	(New Zealand) Dean McCrostie	1-6
(New Zealand) Palmside Motorsport	Ford Escort RS1800 MkII	M	(New Zealand) Deane Buist	(Philippines) Karl Celeste	1-4
(New Zealand) McIver Motorsport	Ford Escort MkII	M	(New Zealand) Tim McIver	(New Zealand) Rocky Hudson	1
(New Zealand) Derek Ayson	Opel Manta 400	M	(New Zealand) Derek Ayson	(Australia) Catriona Kelly	1-2
(New Zealand) Paul Cross	Toyota Corolla AE86	M	(New Zealand) Paul Cross	(New Zealand) Janey Blair	1-3
(New Zealand) Paddon Rallysport	Ford Escort RS1800 MkII	M	(New Zealand) Andy Martin	(New Zealand) Matt Hayward	5-6

=== Rally Challenge ===
==== Category 5A (4WD) ====
Entrant	Model	Tyre	Driver	Co-Driver	Rounds
(New Zealand) Grant Blackberry	Mitsubishi Lancer Evo X	N/A	(New Zealand) Grant Blackberry	(United Kingdom) Ric Chalmers	1-2, 4, 6
(New Zealand) Caleb MacDonald	Mitsubishi Lancer Evo 8	N/A	(New Zealand) Caleb MacDonald	(Australia) Erin Kelly	1-2
(New Zealand) Paddon Rallysport	Subaru Impreza WRX RA	N/A	(New Zealand) Andy Martin	(New Zealand) Matt Hayward	1
(New Zealand) Silcock Motorsport	Mitsubishi Lancer Evo 6	N/A	(New Zealand) Harri Silcock	(New Zealand) Mark Greenwood	1-3
(New Zealand) Josh Keighley	Subaru Impreza H6	N/A	(New Zealand) Josh Keighley	(New Zealand) Neill Woolley	1-4, 6
(New Zealand) Thomas Paul Rallying	Subaru Impreza H6	N/A	(New Zealand) Thomas Paul	(New Zealand) Bridget Airey	1-3, 6
(New Zealand) McIver Motorsport	Subaru Impreza H6	N/A	(New Zealand) James McIver	(New Zealand) Brody Cattermole	1-3
(New Zealand) Kevin Laird	Subaru Impreza H6	N/A	(New Zealand) Kevin Laird	(New Zealand) Aled Jones	1-3
(New Zealand) James Macdonald	Subaru Impreza H6	N/A	(New Zealand) James Macdonald	(New Zealand) Josh Edwards	1
(New Zealand) Terri Taylor	Subaru Impreza GT	N/A	(New Zealand) Terri Taylor	(New Zealand) Daph O'Rourke	1-3
(New Zealand) Willy Hawes	Toyota Celica GT-4	N/A	(New Zealand) Willy Hawes	(Australia) Veronica Penny	1-2
(New Zealand) Robert Darrington	Toyota Yaris AP4	N/A	(Australia) Robert Darrington	(New Zealand) Mel Peden	1
(New Zealand) Robert Darrington	Subaru Legacy RS	N/A	(Australia) Robert Darrington	(New Zealand) Mel Peden	5

==== Category 5B (2WD) ====
Entrant	Model	Tyre	Driver	Co-Driver	Rounds
(Republic of Ireland) Shamrock Motorsport	Ford Escort RS1800 MkII	N/A	(Republic of Ireland) Richie Dalton	(Republic of Ireland) Mac Kierans	1, 6
(Australia) Sean McAloon	Ford Escort MkII	N/A	(Australia) Sean McAloon	(Australia) Mathew James	1
(Republic of Ireland) Michael O'Hagan	Ford Escort MkII	N/A	(Republic of Ireland) Michael O'Hagan	(Republic of Ireland) Eoin Moynihan	1
(Australia) Alcorn Motorsport	Ford Escort MkII	N/A	(Australia) Glenn Alcorn	(Republic of Ireland) Eoin Moynihan	1
(New Zealand) Darren Galbraith	Ford Fiesta R2	N/A	(New Zealand) Darren Galbraith	(New Zealand) Rocky Hudson	2
(New Zealand) Silcock Motorsport	Ford Fiesta R2	N/A	(New Zealand) Josh Silcock	(New Zealand) Ben Leech	1-3
(New Zealand) Silcock Motorsport	Ford Fiesta R2	N/A	(New Zealand) Josh Silcock	(New Zealand) Daph O'Rourke	4, 6
(New Zealand) Rory Lawn	Toyota Starlet	N/A	(New Zealand) Rory Lawn	(New Zealand) Matt Sayers	1-3, 5-6
(New Zealand) Tony McConachy	Toyota Starlet Hyabusa	N/A	(New Zealand) Tony McConachy	(New Zealand) Sarah Brennan	1
(New Zealand) McCrae Sloper	BMW E36	N/A	(New Zealand) McCrae Sloper	(New Zealand) David Christie	1
(New Zealand) Mackersy Motorsport	Suzuki Swift Sport Cup	N/A	(New Zealand) Ian Warren	(New Zealand) Matt Priest	2
(New Zealand) Mackersy Motorsport	Suzuki Swift Sport Cup	N/A	(Australia) Taylor Gill	(Australia) Matthew Whitten	6

==== Category 5C (4WD - Gp A) ====
Entrant	Model	Tyre	Driver	Co-Driver	Rounds
(New Zealand) Josh Keighley	Subaru Impreza H6	N/A	(New Zealand) Josh Keighley	(New Zealand) Neill Woolley	1-4
(New Zealand) Thomas Paul Rallying	Subaru Impreza H6	N/A	(New Zealand) Thomas Paul	(New Zealand) Bridget Airey	1-3
(New Zealand) McIver Motorsport	Subaru Impreza H6	N/A	(New Zealand) James McIver	(New Zealand) Brody Cattermole	1-3
(New Zealand) Kevin Laird	Subaru Impreza H6	N/A	(New Zealand) Kevin Laird	(New Zealand) Aled Jones	1-3
(New Zealand) James Macdonald	Subaru Impreza H6	N/A	(New Zealand) James Macdonald	(New Zealand) Josh Edwards	1
(New Zealand) Terri Taylor	Subaru Impreza GT	N/A	(New Zealand) Terri Taylor	(New Zealand) Daph O'Rourke	1-3

=== Teams Cup ===
==== Categories 1-4 & 6 ====
Team Name	Car	Tyre	Drivers	Co-Drivers	Cat	Rounds
(New Zealand) Stokes Motorsport	Škoda Fabia Rally2 evo	M	(New Zealand) Robbie Stokes	(Australia) Andy Sarandis	1	1-2
(New Zealand) Stokes Motorsport	Škoda Fabia Rally2 evo	M	(New Zealand) Robbie Stokes	(Scotland) Ally Mackay	1	3-5
(New Zealand) Stokes Motorsport	Škoda Fabia Rally2 evo	M	(New Zealand) Jack Stokes	(New Zealand) Hayden Graves	1	1-5
(New Zealand) Team Sth Auckland Car Club	Toyota GR Yaris Rally2	M	(New Zealand) Jack Hawkeswood	(New Zealand) Jason Farmer	1	1-5
(New Zealand) Team Sth Auckland Car Club	Honda Jazz RS	M	(New Zealand) Dave Strong	(New Zealand) Rob Scott	3	1-5
(New Zealand) Real Fords of NZ	Ford Escort RS1800 MkII	M	(New Zealand) Deane Buist	(Philippines) Karl Celeste	1	1-4
(New Zealand) Real Fords of NZ	Ford Fiesta Rally4	M	(New Zealand) Tim Mackersy	(New Zealand) Lauren Mackersy	3	1-3, 5
(New Zealand) ESCC Classics	Opel Manta 400	M	(New Zealand) Derek Ayson	(Australia) Catriona Kelly	6C	1-2
(New Zealand) ESCC Classics	Toyota Corolla AE86	M	(New Zealand) Paul Cross	(New Zealand) Janey Blair	6C	1-3
(New Zealand) North Island Cat 6s	Mazda RX-7	M	(New Zealand) Ben Harding	(New Zealand) Charlotte Harding	6C	1-5
(New Zealand) North Island Cat 6s	Ford Escort MkII BDA	M	(New Zealand) Roger McKay	(New Zealand) Dean McCrostie	6C	1-5

==== Categories 5 ====
Team Name	Car	Tyre	Drivers	Co-Drivers	Cat	Rounds
(New Zealand) Silcock Motorsport	Ford Fiesta R2	N/A	(New Zealand) Josh Silcock	(New Zealand) Ben Leech	5B	1-3
(New Zealand) Silcock Motorsport	Ford Fiesta R2	N/A	(New Zealand) Josh Silcock	(New Zealand) Daph O'Rourke	5B	4
(New Zealand) Silcock Motorsport	Mitsubishi Lancer Evo 6	N/A	(New Zealand) Harri Silcock	(New Zealand) Mark Greenwood	5A	1-3
(New Zealand) Team H6	Subaru Impreza H6	N/A	(New Zealand) Josh Keighley	(New Zealand) Neill Woolley	5A / 5C	1-4
(New Zealand) Team H6	Subaru Impreza H6	N/A	(New Zealand) Thomas Paul	(New Zealand) Bridget Airey	5A / 5C	1-3
(New Zealand) Big Belly Rally	Mitsubishi Lancer Evo 8	N/A	(New Zealand) Caleb MacDonald	(Australia) Erin Kelly	5A	1-2
(New Zealand) Big Belly Rally	Subaru Impreza H6	N/A	(New Zealand) Kevin Laird	(New Zealand) Aled Jones	5A / 5C	1-3
(New Zealand) MCL M-Sport	Ford Escort RS1800 MkII	N/A	(Republic of Ireland) Richie Dalton	(Republic of Ireland) Mac Kierans	5B	1
(New Zealand) MCL M-Sport	Ford Escort MkII	N/A	(Australia) Glenn Alcorn	(Republic of Ireland) Eoin Moynihan	5B	1

== Calendar ==
2026 NZRC Rounds Map

The 2026 season is scheduled to be contested over six rounds, three in the North Island and three in the South Island.

Round	Date	Rally	Organising Club	Rally Headquarters	Surface	Stages	Competitive Distance	Ref.
1	10–12 April	Otago Rally	Otago Sports Car Club	Dunedin, Otago, New Zealand	Gravel	16	284.26 km	
2	31 May	Canterbury Rally	Autosport Car Club	Rangiora, Canterbury, New Zealand	Gravel	9	128.75 km	
3	18 July	Rally Southland	Eastern Southland Car Club	Invercargill, Southland, New Zealand	Gravel	7	159.20 km	
4	22 August	Rally Hawke's Bay	Hawke's Bay Car Club	Napier, Hawke's Bay, New Zealand	Gravel	5	122.72 km	
5	25-27 September	Rally of Whangarei	Rally New Zealand Club Inc	Whangarei, Northland, New Zealand	Gravel	18	288.51 km	
6	31 October	Rally Bay of Plenty	Rally Bay of Plenty	Whakatāne, Bay of Plenty, New Zealand	Gravel	9	162.18 km	

== Results ==
=== Winners Per Event ===
Round	Event	Winning driver	Winning Co-Driver	Winning car	Winning Team	Ref.
1	Otago Rally	(New Zealand) Jack Stokes	(New Zealand) Hayden Graves	(Czech Republic) Škoda Fabia Rally2 evo	(New Zealand) Real Fords of NZ	
2	Canterbury Rally	(New Zealand) Jack Hawkeswood	(New Zealand) Jason Farmer	(Japan) Toyota GR Yaris Rally2	(New Zealand) Real Fords of NZ	
3	Rally Southland	(New Zealand) Jack Stokes	(New Zealand) Hayden Graves	(Czech Republic) Škoda Fabia Rally2 evo	(New Zealand) Real Fords of NZ	
4	Rally Hawke's Bay	(New Zealand) Jack Hawkeswood	(New Zealand) Jason Farmer	(Japan) Toyota GR Yaris Rally2	(New Zealand) Team Sth Auckland Car Club	
5	Rally of Whangarei	(New Zealand) Jack Hawkeswood	(New Zealand) Jason Farmer	(Japan) Toyota GR Yaris Rally2	(New Zealand) Team Sth Auckland Car Club	
6	Rally Bay of Plenty	(New Zealand) Jack Hawkeswood	(New Zealand) Jason Farmer	(Japan) Toyota GR Yaris Rally2	(New Zealand) North Island Cat 6s	

=== Overall ===
==== Drivers ====
Pos.	Driver Name	(New Zealand) OTA			(New Zealand) CAN	(New Zealand) SOU	(New Zealand) HAW	(New Zealand) WHA			(New Zealand) BOP	Points Total
Pos.	Driver Name	L1	L2	Rd	Rd	Rd	Rd	L1	L2	Rd	Rd	Points Total
1	(New Zealand) Jack Hawkeswood	2	1	2 ^{3}	1 ^{2}	2 ^{3}	1 ^{1}	1	1	1 ^{2}	1 ^{1}	194
2	(New Zealand) Quentin Palmer	4	3	3 ^{5}	3 ^{3}	4 ^{2}	4 ^{4}	3	3	3 ^{3}	2 ^{2}	148
3	(New Zealand) Jack Stokes	1	2	1 ^{2}	2 ^{1}	1 ^{1}	3 ^{2}			DNF^{1}		127
4	(New Zealand) Ben Harding			11	8	8	8			8	6	89
5	(New Zealand) Robbie Stokes	3		DNF^{1}	DNF	3 ^{4}	2 ^{2}	2	2	2		88
6	(New Zealand) Roger McKay			16	11	11	10			10	7	71
7	(New Zealand) Dave Strong			10	10		9			7	DNF	70
8	(New Zealand) Ari Pettigrew	5	4	4 ^{4}	4 ^{4}	5 ^{5}				DNF^{4}		66
9	(New Zealand) Tim Mackersy			6	9	9				6		61
10	(New Zealand) Deane Buist			5	5	6						53
11	(Vanuatu) Pierre-Henri Brunet			8	7			5	5	5	DNF	51
12=	(New Zealand) Pat Norris			20	13	13	12			13		43
12=	(New Zealand) Mike Cameron			21	14	14	13			12	10	43
14=	(New Zealand) Andy Martin			DNF		10				9	8	41
14=	(New Zealand) Phil Macquarie			17	12	12	11			11	DNF	41
16	(New Zealand) William Menzies						6				3 ^{3}	40
17	(New Zealand) Jackson Clendon						7				4 ^{4}	37
18	(Australia) Toby Price		5	7			5 ^{5}					36
19	(New Zealand) Carter Strang					7					5 ^{5}	35
20	(Vanuatu) Nelson Law			12	6							28
21	(New Zealand) Ben Hunt					DNF		4	4	4 ^{5}		24
22	(New Zealand) Paul Cross			13								21
23	(Japan) Fuyuhiko Takahashi			18							9	19
24	(New Zealand) Derek Ayson			9	DNF^{5}							15
25	(New Zealand) Duncan McCrostie			14								9
26	(New Zealand) Stumpy Holmes			15								8
27	(Spain) Edgar Vigo Lopez			19								4
	(New Zealand) Mark Parsons			DNF								
	(Australia) Tim McIver			DNF								
	(New Zealand) Dylan Thomson			DNF								
	(New Zealand) Willy Hawes			DNF	DNF							
	(New Zealand) Darren Galbraith				DNF							

==== Co-Drivers ====
Pos.	Driver Name	(New Zealand) OTA			(New Zealand) CAN	(New Zealand) SOU	(New Zealand) HAW	(New Zealand) WHA			(New Zealand) BOP	Points Total
Pos.	Driver Name	L1	L2	Rd	Rd	Rd	Rd	L1	L2	Rd	Rd	Points Total
1	(New Zealand) Jason Farmer	2	1	2 ^{3}	1 ^{2}	2 ^{3}	1 ^{1}	1	1	1 ^{2}	1 ^{1}	194
2	(New Zealand) Hayden Graves	1	2	1 ^{2}	2 ^{1}	1 ^{1}	3 ^{2}			DNF^{1}		127
3	(New Zealand) Michael Goudie				3 ^{3}	4 ^{2}	4 ^{4}	3	3	3 ^{3}	2 ^{2}	122
4	(New Zealand) Charlotte Harding			11	8	8	8			8	6	89
5	(Scotland) Ally Mackay					3 ^{4}	2 ^{2}	2	2	2		80
6	(New Zealand) Dean McCrostie			16	11	11	10			10	7	71
7	(New Zealand) Rob Scott			10	10		9			7	DNF	70
8	(New Zealand) Sean Lockyear			8	7		7	5	5	5	DNF	67
9	(New Zealand) Jack Norris	5	4	4 ^{4}	4 ^{4}	5 ^{5}				DNF^{4}		66
10	(New Zealand) Lauren Mackersy			6	9	9				6		61
11	(New Zealand) Karl Celeste			5	5	6						53
12=	(New Zealand) Matt Hayward					10				9	8	41
12=	(Australia) Andrew Brooks			17	12	12	11			11	DNF	41
14	(New Zealand) Doug Dolan						6				3 ^{3}	40
15	(Australia) Larisa Biggar		5	7							4 ^{4}	38
16	(New Zealand) Kelly Carson				14		13			12		30
17	(Vanuatu) Antonio Korikalo			12	6							28
18	(Republic of Ireland) Noel Moloney	4	3	3 ^{5}								26
19	(New Zealand) Jared Hudson							4	4	4 ^{5}		24
20	(New Zealand) Janey Blair			13								21
21=	(Australia) Ben Searcy						5 ^{5}					19
21=	(New Zealand) Jason Robb										5 ^{5}	19
23	(New Zealand) Kingsley Jones					7						16
24	(Australia) Catriona Kelly			9	DNF^{5}							15
25	(Japan) Isao Kono										9	14
26=	(New Zealand) Helen Cameron			21							10	13
26=	(New Zealand) Geoff Parr			20		13						13
28	(Australia) Veronica Penny			DNF	DNF		12					11
29	(New Zealand) Mike Matherson									13		10
30=	(New Zealand) Kevin Cooke					13						9
30=	(New Zealand) Greg Fitzgerald			14								9
32=	(Australia) Andrew Sarandis	3		DNF^{1}	DNF							8
32=	(New Zealand) Kevin Vince			15								8
34	(Japan) Ken Takahashi			18								5
35	(Spain) Fatima Ameneiro			19								4
	(New Zealand) Rocky Hudson			DNF	DNF							
	(New Zealand) Mal Clark			DNF								
	(New Zealand) Bayden Thomson			DNF								
	(New Zealand) Tony Rawstron					DNF						

=== Points System ===
Points Format	Position																			
Points Format	1st	2nd	3rd	4th	5th	6th	7th	8th	9th	10th	11th	12th	13th	14th	15th	16th	17th	18th	19th	20th
Round Points	25	22	20	19	18	17	16	15	14	13	12	11	10	9	8	7	6	5	4	3
Leg Points	7	5	3	2	1															
Power Stage	5	4	3	2	1															

- Round Points: Awarded for Top 20 Overall / Class
- Leg Points: Awarded for Top 5 overall for each day. (Otago / Whangarei)
- Power Stage: Awarded for Top 5 fastest on the Power Stage (Overall / Class)
