= 2022 New Zealand Rally Championship =

Motor racing competition

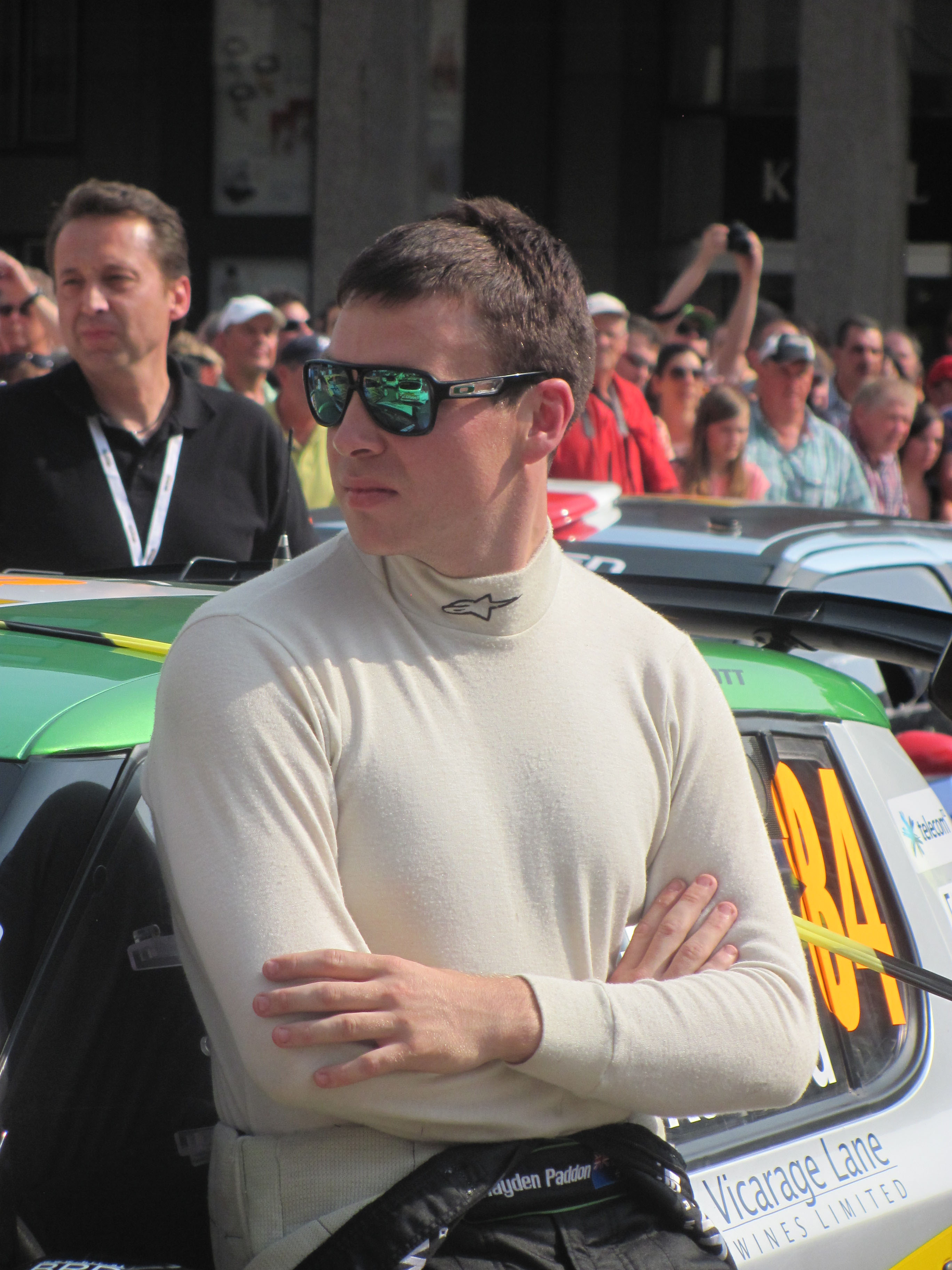
Hayden Paddon is the defending driver's champion and current drivers points leader.

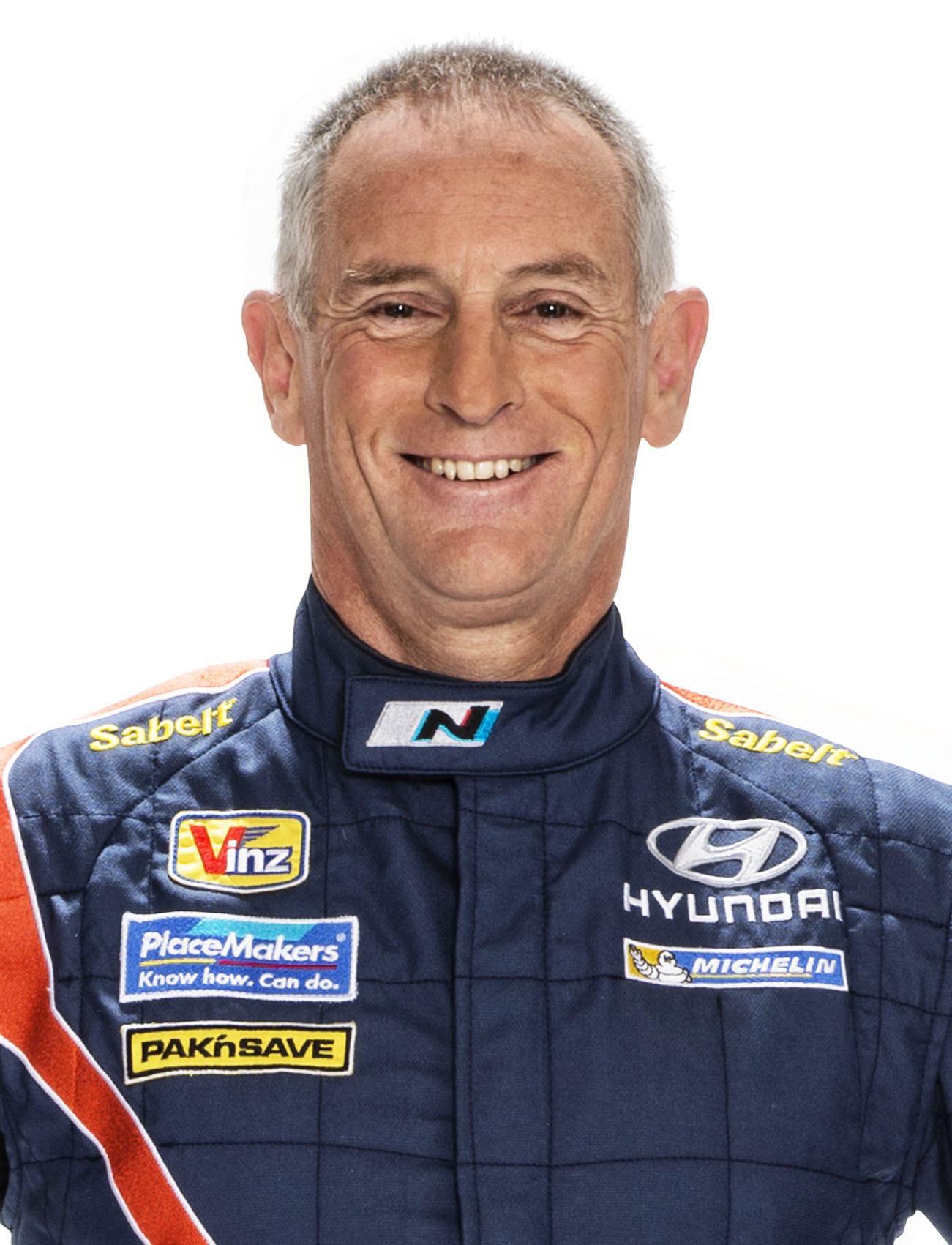
John Kennard is the defending co-driver champion and current co-drivers points leader.

2022 New Zealand Rally Championship details the outcome of the New Zealand Rally Championship for the year 2022.

== Teams and Drivers ==
=== 4WD ===
Manufacturer	Model	Entrant	Tyre	Driver	Co-Driver	Rounds
Audi	Audi S1 AP4+	(New Zealand) Turner Motorsport	H	(New Zealand) Dylan Turner	(New Zealand) Jeff Cress	1
Audi	Audi S1 AP4+	(New Zealand) Turner Motorsport	H	(New Zealand) Dylan Turner	(New Zealand) Tania Cresswell	5-6
Ford	Ford Fiesta AP4+	(New Zealand) Stokes Motorsport	P	(New Zealand) Robbie Stokes	(New Zealand) Amy Stokes	1–4
Ford	Ford Fiesta AP4+	(New Zealand) Campbell Rallysport	P	(New Zealand) Phil Campbell	(New Zealand) Brianna Little	All
Ford	Ford Fiesta Rally2	(New Zealand) Team Online Racing	P	(New Zealand) Todd Bawden	(New Zealand) Paul Burborough	All
Holden	Holden Barina AP4+	(New Zealand) RDL Rally Team	P	(New Zealand) Josh Marston	(New Zealand) Andrew Graves	2–6
Holden	Holden Barina AP4+	(New Zealand) Paddon Rallysport	D	(New Zealand) Ari Pettigrew	(New Zealand) Jason Farmer	All
Hyundai	Hyundai i20 AP4+	(New Zealand) Paddon Rallysport	P	(New Zealand) Hayden Paddon	(New Zealand) John Kennard	1–2, 5–6
Hyundai	Hyundai i20 AP4+	(New Zealand) Paddon Rallysport	P	(New Zealand) Hayden Paddon	(New Zealand) Jared Hudson	3
Mazda	Mazda 2 AP4+	(New Zealand) Force Motorsport		(New Zealand) Matt Jensen	(New Zealand) Tyson Jemmett	1–2, 4
Mazda	Mazda 2 AP4+	(New Zealand) Force Motorsport	P	(New Zealand) Duncan McCrostie	(New Zealand) Samantha Gray	1–4
Mazda	Mazda 2 AP4+	(New Zealand) Force Motorsport	P	(New Zealand) Glenn Inkster	(New Zealand) Spencer Winn	1–3
Mitsubishi	Mitsubishi Mirage AP4+	(New Zealand) Matt Summerfield Rally	D	(New Zealand) Matt Summerfield	(New Zealand) Nicole Summerfield	1–4
Mitsubishi	Mitsubishi Mirage AP4+	Team Ralliart New Zealand	P	(New Zealand) Brian Green	(New Zealand) Fleur Pedersen	1–4
Skoda	Skoda Fabia R5	(New Zealand) Auckland Dental Clinic	P	(New Zealand) Kingsley Jones	(New Zealand) Waverley Jones	1–3
Skoda	Skoda Fabia R5	(Australia) Race Torque	P	(New Zealand) Shane van Gisbergen	(Australia) Glen Weston	4–6
Skoda	Skoda Fabia R5	(New Zealand) Big Black Motorsport	P	(New Zealand) Raana Horan	(New Zealand) Michael Connor	1–2
Skoda	Skoda Fabia Rally2 evo	(New Zealand) Big Black Motorsport	P	(New Zealand) Raana Horan	(New Zealand) Michael Connor	3–4
Skoda	Skoda Fabia Rally2 evo	(New Zealand) Ben Hunt Motorsport	P	(New Zealand) Ben Hunt	(New Zealand) Tony Rawstorn	1–3
Subaru	Subaru Impreza WRX STI	(New Zealand) SAS Motorsport	D	(New Zealand) Mike Young	(New Zealand) Malcolm Read	1
Suzuki	Suzuki Swift AP4+	(New Zealand) Gilmour Motors	P	(New Zealand) Emma Gilmour	(New Zealand) Malcolm Peden	1–2
Toyota	Toyota Yaris AP4+	(New Zealand) Haydn Mackenzie Motorsport	P	(New Zealand) Haydn Mackenzie	(New Zealand) Michael Gouldie	4
Toyota	Toyota Yaris AP4+	Toyota Gazoo Racing New Zealand	P	(New Zealand) Jack Hawkswood	(New Zealand) Sarah Brennan	1–4
Toyota	Toyota GR Yaris AP4+	Toyota Gazoo Racing New Zealand	P	(New Zealand) Jack Hawkswood	(New Zealand) Sarah Brennan	5-6
Volkswagen	Volkswagen Polo GTI R5	(New Zealand) Carbon Works Rally Team	P	(New Zealand) Andy Martin	(New Zealand) Matt Hayward	3–4

=== 2WD ===
==== FIA Group N ====
Manufacturer	Model	Entrant	Tyre	Driver	Co-Driver	Rounds
Ford	Ford Fiesta R2	(New Zealand) Ramsay Rallysport		(New Zealand) Lukas Ramsay	(South Africa) Sean Thompson	1–3
Ford	Ford Fiesta R2	(New Zealand) Ramsay Rallysport		(New Zealand) Lukas Ramsay	(New Zealand) Dave Neil	4
Ford	Ford Fiesta R2	(New Zealand) Carbon Works Rally Team	P	(New Zealand) Andy Martin	(New Zealand) Matt Hayward	1
Ford	Ford Fiesta R2	(New Zealand) Tim Mackersy		(New Zealand) Tim Mackersy	(New Zealand) Lauren Mackersy	TBA
Ford	Ford Fiesta Rally4	(New Zealand) Clendon Motorsport / PR		(New Zealand) Jackson Clendon	(Australia) Andrew Brooks	2
Ford	Ford Fiesta Rally4	(New Zealand) Clendon Motorsport / PR		(New Zealand) Jackson Clendon	(New Zealand) Tania Cresswell	3
Ford	Ford Fiesta ST150	(Wales) Jones Motorsport / PR	K	(New Zealand) Bryn Jones	(New Zealand) Jared Hudson	1–2, 4
Ford	Ford Fiesta ST150	(Wales) Jones Motorsport / PR	K	(New Zealand) Bryn Jones	(New Zealand) Rocky Hudson	3
Ford	Ford Fiesta ST150	(New Zealand) Jean-Paul van der Meys	D	(New Zealand) Jean-Paul van der Meys	(New Zealand) Troy Twomey	1–4
Ford	Ford Fiesta ST150	(New Zealand) Dylan Thomson Rallysport	D	(New Zealand) Dylan Thomson	(New Zealand) Bayden Thomson	1–4
Honda	Honda Civic	(New Zealand) Charlie Evans Motorsport		(New Zealand) Charlie Evans	(New Zealand) Dayna Kiekebosch	1–3
Honda	Honda Civic	(New Zealand) Charlie Evans Motorsport		(New Zealand) Charlie Evans	(South Africa) Sean Thompson	4
Suzuki	Suzuki Swift	(New Zealand) Grant Motorsport / PR		(New Zealand) Jordan Grant	(New Zealand) Glenn Goldring	1–4
Toyota	Toyota Vitz	(New Zealand) Clendon Motorsport / PR		(New Zealand) Jackson Clendon	(Australia) Andrew Brooks	1

==== Open 2WD ====
Manufacturer	Model	Entrant	Tyre	Driver	Co-Driver	Rounds
BMW	BMW 328i	(New Zealand) Kayne Barrie Motorsport	D	(New Zealand) McCrae Sloper	(New Zealand) Dave Christie	2, 4
Ford	Ford Escort Mk2	(New Zealand) Haines Motorsport		(New Zealand) Daniel Haines	(New Zealand) Matt Priest	1–4
Ford	Ford Escort Mk2	(New Zealand) Allan Murphy		(New Zealand) Allan Murphy	(New Zealand) David Bunyard	4
Honda	Honda Jazz RS	(New Zealand) Strong Motorsport		(New Zealand) David Strong	(New Zealand) Carol Liston	1–4
Mazda	Mazda RX-7 FD3	(New Zealand) Farrell Motorsport		(New Zealand) Peter Farrell	(New Zealand) Matt Rolley	2–4
Mazda	Mazda RX-8	(New Zealand) Al Marsh Motorsport		(New Zealand) Marcus van Klink	(New Zealand) Dave Neil	3
Toyota	Toyota Corolla DX	(New Zealand) Suspension Tech Ltd		(New Zealand) Chris Alexander	(New Zealand) Yvonne Fullerton	1
Toyota	Toyota Corolla DX	(New Zealand) Suspension Tech Ltd		(New Zealand) Chris Alexander	(New Zealand) Kim Raggett	2–4
Toyota	Toyota GT86	(New Zealand) Ramsay Motorsport		(New Zealand) Brent Taylor	(New Zealand) Chris Ramsay	1, 4

==== Historic ====
Manufacturer	Model	Entrant	Tyre	Driver	Co-Driver	Rounds
Ford	Ford Escort	(Wales) Jones Motorsport	K	(Wales) Anthony Jones	(New Zealand) Zoe Jones	1–4
Ford	Ford Escort RS1800	(New Zealand) Shane Murland		(New Zealand) Shane Murland	(New Zealand) Kane Seymour	1–4
Mazda	Mazda RX-7 Gp B	(New Zealand) Smith and Silcok Transport	K	(New Zealand) John Silcok	(New Zealand) Donna Elder	1–3
Mitsubishi	Mitsubishi Lancer EX Turbo	(New Zealand) Graeme Coey	D	(New Zealand) Graeme Coey	(New Zealand) James Cowles	1

=== Rally Challenge ===
==== 4WD ====
Manufacturer	Model	Entrant	Tyre	Driver	Co-Driver	Rounds
Ford	Ford Fiesta Proto	(New Zealand) RCK Contractors		(New Zealand) Clinton Cunningham	(New Zealand) Eddie Hayman	2
Mitsubishi	Mitsubishi Lancer Evo III	(New Zealand) Lockyear Rallysport		(New Zealand) Chris Lockyear	(New Zealand) Sean Lockyear	1, 4
Mitsubishi	Mitsubishi Lancer Evo IV	(New Zealand) Andrew Elder		(New Zealand) Andrew Elder	(New Zealand) Donna Elder	4
Mitsubishi	Mitsubishi Lancer Evo VIII	(New Zealand) Redfern Motorsport		(New Zealand) Warwick Redfern	(New Zealand) Dan Reichenbach	2
Mitsubishi	Mitsubishi Lancer Evo VIII	(New Zealand) Redfern Motorsport		(New Zealand) Warwick Redfern	(New Zealand) Andy Watkins	4
Mitsubishi	Mitsubishi Lancer Evo IX	(New Zealand) 50 one 50 Motorsport	D	(New Zealand) Brynley Smith	(New Zealand) Andy Beck	1–2, 4
Mitsubishi	Mitsubishi Lancer Evo IX	(New Zealand) Mo Bro Racing		(New Zealand) Matt Adams	(New Zealand) David Holder	4
Mitsubishi	Mitsubishi Lancer Evo X	(New Zealand) Wayne Muckle		(New Zealand) Wayne Muckle	(New Zealand) Tania Cresswell	1
Mitsubishi	Mitsubishi Lancer Evo X	(New Zealand) Haydn Mackenzie Motorsport		(New Zealand) Haydn Mackenzie	(New Zealand) Michael Goudie	2
Subaru	Subaru Impreza WRX	(Scotland) Sean Haggerty	P	(Scotland) Sean Haggerty	(New Zealand) Bella Haggerty	1, 3
Subaru	Subaru Impreza WRX	(New Zealand) Mark Pedersen		(New Zealand) Mark Pedersen	(New Zealand) Caitlin Chubb	1
Subaru	Subaru Impreza WRX	(New Zealand) Sharp Motorsport		(New Zealand) Jay Sharp	(New Zealand) Matt Sayers	2
Subaru	Subaru Impreza H6	(New Zealand) Paul Cross		(New Zealand) Paul Cross	(New Zealand) Janey Blair	3
Subaru	Subaru Impreza H6	(New Zealand) Magnum Motorsport		(New Zealand) Steve Cox	(New Zealand) Laurie Brenssell	1–3
Subaru	Subaru Impreza H6	(New Zealand) Magnum Motorsport		(New Zealand) Amy Keighley	(New Zealand) Nikita Gibson	1, 3–4
Subaru	Subaru Impreza H6	(New Zealand) Magnum Motorsport		(New Zealand) Amy Keighley	(New Zealand) Ben Trevalyn	2
Subaru	Subaru Impreza WRX	(New Zealand) Dunlop Motorsport		(New Zealand) James Dunlop	(New Zealand) Chris Avery	4
Subaru	Subaru Impreza WRX	(New Zealand) David Sievers		(New Zealand) David Sievers	(Republic of Ireland) Noel Moloney	1–4
Subaru	Subaru Impreza WRX	(New Zealand) Semog Racing NZ		(New Zealand) Jeff Ward	(New Zealand) Murray O'Neil	1, 3–4
Subaru	Subaru Impreza WRX	(New Zealand) Wooden Automotive Racing		(New Zealand) Dave Ollis	(New Zealand) Gemma Thomas	1, 3–4
Subaru	Subaru Legacy RS RA	(New Zealand) Simon Bell		(New Zealand) Simon Bell	(New Zealand) Warwick Martin	1–2

==== 2WD ====
Manufacturer	Model	Entrant	Tyre	Driver	Co-Driver	Rounds
Ford	Ford Fiesta R2	(New Zealand) Carbon Works Rally Team	P	(New Zealand) Andy Martin	(New Zealand) Matt Hayward	2
Honda	Honda Civic	(New Zealand) David Taylor		(New Zealand) David Taylor	(New Zealand) Arthur Broughan	1
Mitsubishi	Mitsubishi Lancer MR	(New Zealand) Sam Byrne		(New Zealand) Sam Byrne	(New Zealand) Leanne Williams	1–3
Subaru	Subaru Impreza	(New Zealand) Zeal Jones Racing		(New Zealand) Zeal Jones	(New Zealand) Austen Jones	1–2
Toyota	Toyota MR2	(New Zealand) Jeff Torkington		(New Zealand) Jeff Torkington	(New Zealand) Nastassia Subritzky	2
Toyota	Toyota Starlet	(New Zealand) Jonty Brensell		(New Zealand) Jonty Brensell	(New Zealand) Daph O'Rourke	1, 3
Toyota	Toyota Starlet	(New Zealand) Manukau Auto Centre		(New Zealand) Daniel Alexander	(New Zealand) Kieran Anstis	2
Toyota	Toyota Vitz RS 1500 Turbo	(New Zealand) Rallylife Motorsport		(New Zealand) Jono Shapley	(New Zealand) Raymond Bennett	1–3

==== Classic 4WD ====
Manufacturer	Model	Entrant	Tyre	Driver	Co-Driver	Rounds
Mitsubishi	Mitsubishi Lancer Evo III	(New Zealand) Lockyear Rallysport		(New Zealand) Chris Lockyear	(New Zealand) Sean Lockyear	1
Subaru	Subaru Impreza WRX	(Scotland) Sean Haggerty		(Scotland) Sean Haggerty	(New Zealand) Bella Haggerty	1, 3
Subaru	Subaru Impreza WRX	(New Zealand) Mark Pedersen		(New Zealand) Mark Pedersen	(New Zealand) Caitlin Chubb	1
Subaru	Subaru Impreza WRX	(New Zealand) Jay Sharp		(New Zealand) Jay Sharp	(New Zealand) Matt Sayers	2
Subaru	Subaru Legacy RS RA	(New Zealand) Simon Bell		(New Zealand) Simon Bell	(New Zealand) Warwick Martin	1–2

==== Teams Entries ====
===== Category 1–4 =====
Team Name	Car	Tyre	Drivers	Co-Drivers	Cat	Rounds
(New Zealand) Back n Black	Skoda Fabia R5	P	(New Zealand) Kingsley Jones	(New Zealand) Waverley Jones	1	1–2
(New Zealand) Back n Black	Skoda Fabia R5	P	(New Zealand) Raana Horan	(New Zealand) Michael Connor	1	1–2
(New Zealand) Central Region Rallying Fords	Toyota Vitz		(New Zealand) Jackson Clendon	(Australia) Andrew Brooks	2	1
(New Zealand) Central Region Rallying Fords	Ford Fiesta Rally4		(New Zealand) Jackson Clendon	(Australia) Andrew Brooks	2	2
(New Zealand) Central Region Rallying Fords	Ford Escort RS1800		(New Zealand) Shane Murland	(New Zealand) Kane Seymour	4	1
(New Zealand) Dogs and Horses	Honda Civic		(New Zealand) Charlie Evans	(New Zealand) Dayna Kiekebosch	2	1
(New Zealand) Dogs and Horses	Toyota GT86		(New Zealand) Brent Taylor	(New Zealand) Chris Ramsay	3	1
(New Zealand) EMsport NZ	Ford Fiesta R2		(New Zealand) Lukas Ramsay	(South Africa) Sean Thompson	2	1
(New Zealand) EMsport NZ	Ford Fiesta Rally2		(New Zealand) Todd Bawden	(New Zealand) Paul Burborough	1	1
(New Zealand) Flooring Performance	Holden Barina AP4+		(New Zealand) Josh Marston	(New Zealand) Andrew Graves	1	TBA
(New Zealand) Flooring Performance	Mitsubishi Lancer EX Turbo	D	(New Zealand) Graeme Coey	(New Zealand) James Cowles	4	1
(New Zealand) Force Motorsport	Mazda 2 AP4+		(New Zealand) Glenn Inkster	(New Zealand) Spencer Winn	1	1
(New Zealand) Force Motorsport	Mazda 2 AP4+		(New Zealand) Duncan McCrostie	(New Zealand) Samantha Gray	1	1
(New Zealand) Green, Strong & Gold	Honda Jazz RS		(New Zealand) David Strong	(New Zealand) Carol Liston	3	1
(New Zealand) Green, Strong & Gold	Mitsubishi Mirage AP4+		(New Zealand) Brian Green	(New Zealand) Fleur Pedersen	1	1
(Wales) Jones Motorsport	Ford Escort RS1800	K	(Wales) Anthony Jones	(New Zealand) Zoe Jones	4	1
(Wales) Jones Motorsport	Ford Fiesta ST150	K	(New Zealand) Bryn Jones	(New Zealand) Jared Hudson	2	1
(New Zealand) North Canterbury	Ford Fiesta AP4+		(New Zealand) Robbie Stokes	(New Zealand) Amy Stokes	1	1
(New Zealand) North Canterbury	Mazda RX-7 Group B	K	(New Zealand) John Silcock	(New Zealand) Donna Elder	4	1
(New Zealand) Paddon Rallysport	Holden Barina AP4+	D	(New Zealand) Ari Pettigrew	(New Zealand) Jason Farmer	1	1
(New Zealand) Paddon Rallysport	Hyundai i20 AP4+	P	(New Zealand) Hayden Paddon	(New Zealand) John Kennard	1	1
(New Zealand) Super Swift Suzukis	Suzuki Swift		(New Zealand) Jordan Grant	(New Zealand) Glenn Goldring	2	1
(New Zealand) Super Swift Suzukis	Suzuki Swift AP4+		(New Zealand) Emma Gilmour	(New Zealand) Malcolm Peden	1	1
(New Zealand) Team Giltrap	Audi S1 AP4+	H	(New Zealand) Dylan Turner	(New Zealand) Jeff Cress	1	1
(New Zealand) Team Giltrap	Skoda Fabia Rally2 evo		(New Zealand) Ben Hunt	(New Zealand) Tony Rawstron	1	1
(New Zealand) Team MBOP Fiestas	Ford Fiesta AP4+		(New Zealand) Phil Campbell	(New Zealand) Brianna Little	1	1
(New Zealand) Team MBOP Fiestas	Ford Fiesta ST150		(New Zealand) Jean-Paul van der Meys	(New Zealand) Troy Twomey	2	1
(New Zealand) Team Toyota	Toyota Yaris AP4+		(New Zealand) Jack Hawkeswood	(New Zealand) Sarah Brennan	1	1
(New Zealand) Team Toyota	Toyota Yaris AP4+		(New Zealand) Hayden Mackenzie	(New Zealand) Michael Gouldie	1	TBA

===== Category 5 =====
Team Name	Car	Tyre	Drivers	Co-Drivers	Category	Rounds
(New Zealand) Flying S's	Mitsubishi Lancer Evo IX		(New Zealand) Brynley Smith	(New Zealand) Andy Beck	5A	1
(New Zealand) Flying S's	Subaru Impreza WRX STI		(New Zealand) David Sievers	(Republic of Ireland) Noel Moloney	5A	1
(New Zealand) GC Rally Team	Subaru Impreza		(New Zealand) Zeal Jones	(New Zealand) Austen Jones	5B	1
(New Zealand) GC Rally Team	Subaru Impreza		(New Zealand) Jay Sharp	(New Zealand) Matt Sayers	5A/5C	2
(New Zealand) North / South Subaru H6	Subaru Impreza H6		(New Zealand) Steve Cox	(New Zealand) Laurie Brenssell	5A	1
(New Zealand) North / South Subaru H6	Subaru Impreza H6		(New Zealand) Paul Cross	(New Zealand) Janey Blair	5A	TBA
(New Zealand) Old and New Subaru	Subaru Impreza WRX STI		(Scotland) Sean Haggerty	(New Zealand) Bella Haggerty	5A/5C	1
(New Zealand) Old and New Subaru	Subaru Impreza WRX		(New Zealand) Jeff Ward	(New Zealand) Murray O'Neil	5A	1
(New Zealand) Orange x Rallylife	Mitsubishi Lancer MR		(New Zealand) Sam Byrne	(New Zealand) Leanne Williams	5B	1
(New Zealand) Orange x Rallylife	Toyota Vitz RS1500 Turbo		(New Zealand) Jono Shapley	(New Zealand) Raymond Bennett	5B	1

== Results ==
=== Summary ===
==== Overall ====
Round	Event	Winning driver	Winning Co-Driver	Winning team	Winning car	Ref.
1	(New Zealand) Otago Rally	(New Zealand) Hayden Paddon	(New Zealand) John Kennard	(New Zealand) Paddon Rallysport	(South Korea) Hyundai i20 AP4+	
2	(New Zealand) International Rally of Whangarei	(New Zealand) Hayden Paddon	(New Zealand) John Kennard	(New Zealand) Paddon Rallysport	(South Korea) Hyundai i20 AP4+	
3	(New Zealand) Rally South Canterbury	(New Zealand) Hayden Paddon	(New Zealand) Jared Hudson	(New Zealand) Paddon Rallysport	(South Korea) Hyundai i20 AP4+	
4	(New Zealand) Hawkes Bay Rally	(New Zealand) Ben Hunt	(New Zealand) Tony Rawstrom	(New Zealand) Hunt Motorsport	(Czech Republic) Skoda Fabia Rally2 evo	
5	Rally New Zealand	(New Zealand) Hayden Paddon	(New Zealand) John Kennard	(New Zealand) Paddon Rallysport	(South Korea) Hyundai i20 N Rally2	
6	Rally New Zealand	(New Zealand) Hayden Paddon	(New Zealand) John Kennard	(New Zealand) Paddon Rallysport	(South Korea) Hyundai i20 N Rally2	

==== FIA Group N ====
Round	Event	Winning driver	Winning Co-Driver	Winning team	Winning car	Ref.
1	(New Zealand) Otago Rally	(New Zealand) Dylan Thomson	(New Zealand) Bayden Thomson	(New Zealand) Dylan Thomson	(United Kingdom) Ford Fiesta ST150	
2	(New Zealand) International Rally of Whangarei	(New Zealand) Jackson Clendon	(Australia) Andrew Brooks	(New Zealand) Clendon Motorsport / PR	(United Kingdom) Ford Fiesta Rally4	
3	(New Zealand) Rally South Canterbury	(New Zealand) Jordan Grant	(New Zealand) Glenn Goldring	(New Zealand) Grant Motorsport / PR	(Japan) Suzuki Swift Sport	
4	(New Zealand) Hawkes Bay Rally	(New Zealand) Dylan Thomson	(New Zealand) Bayden Thomson	(New Zealand) Dylan Thomson	(United Kingdom) Ford Fiesta ST150	
5	Rally New Zealand	(New Zealand) Dylan Thomson	(New Zealand) Bayden Thomson	(New Zealand) Dylan Thomson	(United Kingdom) Ford Fiesta ST150	
6	Rally New Zealand	(New Zealand) Dylan Thomson	(New Zealand) Bayden Thomson	(New Zealand) Dylan Thomson	(United Kingdom) Ford Fiesta ST150	

==== Open 2WD ====
Round	Event	Winning driver	Winning Co-Driver	Winning team	Winning car	Ref.
1	(New Zealand) Otago Rally	(New Zealand) Daniel Haines	(New Zealand) Matt Priest	(New Zealand) Haines Motorsport	(United Kingdom) Ford Escort Mk2	
2	(New Zealand) International Rally of Whangarei	(New Zealand) Dave Strong	(New Zealand) Carol Liston	(New Zealand) Strong Motorsport	(Japan) Honda Jazz RS	
3	(New Zealand) Rally South Canterbury	(New Zealand) Marcus van Klink	(New Zealand) Dave Neil	(New Zealand) Al Marsh Motorsport	(Japan) Mazda RX-8	
4	(New Zealand) Hawkes Bay Rally	(New Zealand) Brent Taylor	(New Zealand) Chris Ramsay	(New Zealand) Ramsay Motorsport	(Japan) Toyota FT86	
5	Rally New Zealand	(New Zealand) Daniel Haines	(New Zealand) Matt Priest	(New Zealand) Haines Motorsport	(United Kingdom) Ford Escort Mk2	
6	Rally New Zealand	(New Zealand) Stumpy Holmes	(New Zealand) Brody Cattermole	(New Zealand) Stumpy Holmes	(United Kingdom) Ford Escort Mk2	

==== Historics ====
Round	Event	Winning driver	Winning Co-Driver	Winning team	Winning car	Ref.
1	(New Zealand) Otago Rally	(New Zealand) John Slicock	(New Zealand) Donna Elder	(New Zealand) Smith and Silcock Transport	(Japan) Mazda RX-7 Gp B	
2	(New Zealand) International Rally of Whangarei	(Wales) Anthony Jones	(New Zealand) Zoe Jones	(Wales) Jones Motorsport	(United Kingdom) Ford Escort	
3	(New Zealand) Rally South Canterbury	(New Zealand) John Slicock	(New Zealand) Donna Elder	(New Zealand) Smith and Silcock Transport	(Japan) Mazda RX-7 Gp B	
4	(New Zealand) Hawkes Bay Rally	(Wales) Anthony Jones	(New Zealand) Zoe Jones	(Wales) Jones Motorsport	(United Kingdom) Ford Escort	
5	Rally New Zealand	(New Zealand)	(New Zealand)	(New Zealand)		
6	Rally New Zealand	(New Zealand)	(New Zealand)	(New Zealand)		

==== Rally Challenge (4WD) ====
Round	Event	Winning driver	Winning Co-Driver	Winning team	Winning car	Ref.
1	(New Zealand) Otago Rally	(New Zealand) Jeff Ward	(New Zealand) Murray O'Neil	(New Zealand) Semog Racing NZ	(Japan) Subaru Impreza WRX	
2	(New Zealand) International Rally of Whangarei	(New Zealand) Haydn Mackenzie	(New Zealand) Michael Gouldie	(New Zealand) Haydn Mackenzie Motorsport	(Japan) Mitsubishi Lancer Evo X	
3	(New Zealand) Rally South Canterbury	(New Zealand) Jeff Ward	(New Zealand) Murray O'Neil	(New Zealand) Semog Racing NZ	(Japan) Subaru Impreza WRX	
4	(New Zealand) Hawkes Bay Rally	(New Zealand)	(New Zealand)	(New Zealand)		
5	Rally New Zealand	(New Zealand)	(New Zealand)	(New Zealand)		
6	Rally New Zealand	(New Zealand)	(New Zealand)	(New Zealand)		

==== Rally Challenge (2WD) ====
Round	Event	Winning driver	Winning Co-Driver	Winning team	Winning car	Ref.
1	(New Zealand) Otago Rally	(New Zealand) Jonty Brensell	(New Zealand) Daph O'Rourke	(New Zealand) Jonty Brensell	(Japan) Toyota Starlet	
2	(New Zealand) International Rally of Whangarei	(New Zealand) Andy Martin	(New Zealand) Matt Hayward	(New Zealand) Carbon Works Rally Team	(United Kingdom) Ford Fiesta R2	
3	(New Zealand) Rally South Canterbury	(New Zealand) Jonty Brensell	(New Zealand) Daph O'Rourke	(New Zealand) Jonty Brensell	(Japan) Toyota Starlet	
4	(New Zealand) Hawkes Bay Rally	(New Zealand)	(New Zealand)	(New Zealand)		
5	Rally New Zealand	(New Zealand)	(New Zealand)	(New Zealand)		
6	Rally New Zealand	(New Zealand)	(New Zealand)	(New Zealand)		

==== Rally Challenge (Classic 4WD) ====
Round	Event	Winning driver	Winning Co-Driver	Winning team	Winning car	Ref.
1	(New Zealand) Otago Rally	(New Zealand) Chris Lockyear	(New Zealand) Sean Lockyear	(New Zealand) Lockyear Rallysport	(Japan) Mitsubishi Lancer Evo 3	
2	(New Zealand) International Rally of Whangarei	(New Zealand) Simon Bell	(New Zealand) Warwick Martin	(New Zealand) Simon Bell	(Japan) Subaru Legacy RS RA	
3	(New Zealand) Rally South Canterbury	(Scotland) Sean Haggerty	(New Zealand) Bella Haggerty	(Scotland) Sean Haggerty	(Japan) Subaru Impreza WRX	
4	(New Zealand) Hawkes Bay Rally	(New Zealand) Chris Lockyear	(New Zealand) Sean Lockyear	(New Zealand) Lockyear Rallysport	Mitsubishi Lancer Evo 3	
5	Rally New Zealand	(New Zealand)	(New Zealand)	(New Zealand)		
6	Rally New Zealand	(New Zealand)	(New Zealand)	(New Zealand)		

=== Points ===
==== Points System ====
Points Format	Position																			
Points Format	1st	2nd	3rd	4th	5th	6th	7th	8th	9th	10th	11th	12th	13th	14th	15th	16th	17th	18th	19th	20th
Championship	25	22	20	19	18	17	16	15	14	13	12	11	10	9	8	7	6	5	4	3
Day Points	7	5	3	2	1															
Power Stage	5	4	3	2	1															

- Championship: Awarded for Top 20 Overall / Class
- Day Points: Awarded for Top 5 overall for each day. (Otago / Whangerai)
- Power Stage: Awarded for Top 5 fastest on the Power Stage (Overall & Class)

=== Overall ===
==== Drivers ====
Pos.	Driver Name	(Otago) OTA			(New Zealand) WHA			(New Zealand) SCA	(New Zealand) HAW	(New Zealand) RNZ1	(New Zealand) RNZ2	Points
Pos.	Driver Name	L1	L2	Rd	L1	L2	Rd	Rd	Rd	Rd	Rd	Points
1	(New Zealand) Hayden Paddon	1	1	1 ^{1}	1	1	1 ^{1}					88
2	(New Zealand) Ben Hunt	2	2	2 ^{2}	3	2	2					66
3	(New Zealand) Raana Horan	4	5	3 ^{4}	5	3	4					47
6	(New Zealand) Robbie Stokes		4	4 ^{3}	Ret	Ret	Ret ^{2}					28
9	(New Zealand) Emma Gilmour	3		5 ^{5}	Ret	Ret	Ret					22
4	(New Zealand) Ari Pettigrew	5		7	4	4	3 ^{3}					43
6=	(New Zealand) Todd Bawden			6	Ret	Ret	Ret					17
8	(New Zealand) Dylan Turner			8								15
9	(New Zealand) Mike Young			9								14
10	(New Zealand) Phil Campbell			10			7					29
11	(New Zealand) Jack Hawkeswood			11								12
12	(New Zealand) Duncan McCrostie			12								11
13	(New Zealand) Dylan Thomson			13								10
14	(New Zealand) John Silcock			14								9
15	(New Zealand) Shane Murland			15								8
16	(New Zealand) Bryn Jones			16								7
17	(New Zealand) Charlie Evans			17								6
18	(New Zealand) Daniel Haines			18								5
19	(Wales) Anthony Jones			19								4
20=	(New Zealand) Matt Summerfield	Ret	3									3
20=	(New Zealand) Lukas Ramsay			20								3

==== Co-Driver ====
Pos.	Driver Name	(Otago) OTA			(New Zealand) WHA			(New Zealand) SCA	(New Zealand) HAW	(New Zealand) RNZ1	(New Zealand) RNZ2	Points
Pos.	Driver Name	L1	L2	Rd	L1	L2	Rd	Rd	Rd	Rd	Rd	Points
1	(New Zealand) John Kennard	1	1	1 ^{1}								44
2	(New Zealand) Tony Rawstorn	2	2	2 ^{2}								36
3	(New Zealand) Michael Connor	4	5	3 ^{4}								25
4	(New Zealand) Amy Stokes		4	4 ^{3}								24
5	(New Zealand) Malcolm Peden	3		5 ^{5}								22
6=	(New Zealand) Jason Farmer	5		7								17
6=	(New Zealand) Paul Burborough			6								17
8	(New Zealand) Jeff Cress			8								15
9	(New Zealand) Malcolm Read			9								14
10	(New Zealand) Brianna Little			10								13
11	(New Zealand) Sarah Brennan			11								12
12	(New Zealand) Samantha Gray			12								11
13	(New Zealand) Bayden Thomson			13								10
14	(New Zealand) Donna Elder			14								9
15	(New Zealand) Kane Seymour			15								8
16	(New Zealand) Jared Hudson			16								7
17	(New Zealand) Dayna Kiekebosch			17								6
18	(New Zealand) Matt Priest			18								5
19	(New Zealand) Zoe Jones			19								4
20=	(New Zealand) Nicole Summerfield	Ret	3									3
20=	(South Africa) Sean Thompson			20								3

=== 4WD ===
==== Drivers ====
Pos.	Driver Name	(Otago) OTA			(New Zealand) WHA			(New Zealand) SCA	(New Zealand) HAW	(New Zealand) RNZ1	(New Zealand) RNZ2	Points
Pos.	Driver Name	L1	L2	Rd	L1	L2	Rd	Rd	Rd	Rd	Rd	Points
1	(New Zealand) Hayden Paddon	1	1	1	1	1	1					88
2	(New Zealand) Ben Hunt											
3	(New Zealand)											
4	(New Zealand)											
5	(New Zealand)											
6	(New Zealand)											
7	(New Zealand)											
8	(New Zealand)											
9	(New Zealand)											
10	(New Zealand)											
11	(New Zealand)											
12	(New Zealand)											
13	(New Zealand)											
14	(New Zealand)											
-	(New Zealand)											
16	(New Zealand)											
17	(New Zealand)											
-	(New Zealand)											

==== Co-Driver ====
Pos.	Co-Driver Name	(Otago) OTA	(New Zealand) WHA	(New Zealand) SCA	(New Zealand) HAW	(New Zealand) RNZ1	(New Zealand) RNZ2	Points
	(New Zealand)							

=== FIA 2WD ===
==== Drivers ====
Pos.	Driver Name	(Otago) OTA	(New Zealand) WHA	(New Zealand) SCA	(New Zealand) HAW	(New Zealand) RNZ1	(New Zealand) RNZ2	Points
	(New Zealand)							

==== Co-Driver ====
Pos.	Co-Driver Name	(Otago) OTA	(New Zealand) WHA	(New Zealand) SCA	(New Zealand) HAW	(New Zealand) RNZ1	(New Zealand) RNZ2	Points
	(New Zealand)							

=== Open 2WD ===
==== Drivers ====
Pos.	Driver Name	(Otago) OTA	(New Zealand) WHA	(New Zealand) SCA	(New Zealand) HAW	(New Zealand) RNZ1	(New Zealand) RNZ2	Points
	(New Zealand)							

==== Co-Driver ====
Pos.	Co-Driver Name	(Otago) OTA	(New Zealand) WHA	(New Zealand) SCA	(New Zealand) HAW	(New Zealand) RNZ1	(New Zealand) RNZ2	Points
	(New Zealand)							

=== Historics ===
==== Drivers ====
Pos.	Driver Name	(Otago) OTA	(New Zealand) WHA	(New Zealand) SCA	(New Zealand) HAW	(New Zealand) RNZ1	(New Zealand) RNZ2	Points
	(New Zealand)							

==== Co-Driver ====
Pos.	Co-Driver Name	(Otago) OTA	(New Zealand) WHA	(New Zealand) SCA	(New Zealand) HAW	(New Zealand) RNZ1	(New Zealand) RNZ2	Points
	(New Zealand)							

=== Rally Challenge 4WD ===
==== Drivers ====
Pos.	Driver Name	(Otago) OTA	(New Zealand) WHA	(New Zealand) SCA	(New Zealand) HAW	(New Zealand) RNZ1	(New Zealand) RNZ2	Points
1	(New Zealand) David Sievers	2 ^{2}	2 ^{2}					48
2	(New Zealand) Amy Keighley	8	3					35
3=	(New Zealand) Jeff Ward	1 ^{1}						30
3=	(New Zealand) Haydn Mackenzie		1 ^{1}					30
5	(New Zealand) Brynley Smith	3 ^{4}	Ret ^{3}					25
6=	(New Zealand) Dave Ollis	5 ^{3}						21
6=	(New Zealand) Steve Cox	4	Ret ^{4}					21
8=	(New Zealand) Chris Lockyear	6						17
8=	(New Zealand) Simon Bell	7	Ret ^{5}					17
10=	(New Zealand) Wayne Muckle	10 ^{5}						14
10=	(New Zealand) Mark Pedersen	9						14

==== Co-Driver ====
Pos.	Co-Driver Name	(Otago) OTA	(New Zealand) WHA	(New Zealand) SCA	(New Zealand) HAW	(New Zealand) RNZ1	(New Zealand) RNZ2	Points
1	(New Zealand) Murray O'Neil	1 ^{1}						30
2	(Republic of Ireland) Noel Moloney	2 ^{2}						26
3	(New Zealand) Andy Beck	3 ^{4}						22
4	(New Zealand) Gemma Thomas	5 ^{3}						21
5	(New Zealand) Laurie Brenssell	4						19
6	(New Zealand) Sean Lockyear	6						17
7	(New Zealand) Warwick Martin	7						16
8	(New Zealand) Nikita Gibson	8						15
9=	(New Zealand) Tania Cresswell	10 ^{5}						14
9=	(New Zealand) Caitlin Chubb	9						14

=== Rally Challenge 2WD ===
==== Drivers ====
Pos.	Driver Name	(Otago) OTA	(New Zealand) WHA	(New Zealand) SCA	(New Zealand) HAW	(New Zealand) RNZ1	(New Zealand) RNZ2	Points
1	(New Zealand) Jono Shapley	3 ^{2}	3 ^{1}					49
2	(New Zealand) Sam Byrne	4 ^{4}	2 ^{4}					45
3	(New Zealand) Jonty Brensell	1 ^{1}						30
4	(New Zealand) Andy Martin		1 ^{2}					29
5	(New Zealand) David Taylor	2 ^{3}						25
6	(New Zealand) Zeal Jones	5 ^{5}	Ret ^{3}					22

==== Co-Driver ====
Pos.	Co-Driver Name	(Otago) OTA	(New Zealand) WHA	(New Zealand) SCA	(New Zealand) HAW	(New Zealand) RNZ1	(New Zealand) RNZ2	Points
1	(New Zealand) Daph O'Rourke	1 ^{1}						30
2	(New Zealand) Arthur Broughan	2 ^{3}						25
3	(New Zealand) Raymond Bennett	3 ^{2}						24
4	(New Zealand) Leanne Williams	4 ^{4}						21
5	(New Zealand) Austen Jones	5 ^{5}						19

=== Rally Challenge Classic 4WD ===
==== Drivers ====
Pos.	Driver Name	(Otago) OTA	(New Zealand) WHA	(New Zealand) SCA	(New Zealand) HAW	(New Zealand) RNZ1	(New Zealand) RNZ2	Points
1	(New Zealand) Simon Bell	2 ^{2}	Ret ^{1}					31
2	(New Zealand) Chris Lockyear	1 ^{1}						30
3	(New Zealand) Mark Pedersen	3 ^{3}						23
-	(Scotland) Sean Haggerty							0
-	(New Zealand) Jay Sharp		Ret					0

==== Co-Driver ====
Pos.	Co-Driver Name	(Otago) OTA	(New Zealand) WHA	(New Zealand) SCA	(New Zealand) HAW	(New Zealand) RNZ1	(New Zealand) RNZ2	Points
1	(New Zealand) Sean Lockyear	1 ^{1}						30
2	(New Zealand) Warwick Martin	2 ^{2}						26
3	(New Zealand) Caitlin Chubb	3 ^{3}						23

=== FIA Junior ===
Pos.	Driver Name	Category	(Otago) OTA	(New Zealand) WHA	(New Zealand) SCA	(New Zealand) HAW	(New Zealand) RNZ1	(New Zealand) RNZ2	Points
1	(New Zealand) Ari Pettigrew	4WD	1	1					50
2	(New Zealand) Jack Hawkeswood	4WD	2	2					44
3	(New Zealand) Bryn Jones	F2	3	5					38
4	(New Zealand) Jordan Grant	F2	5	4					37
5	(New Zealand) Jackson Clendon	F2	7	3					36
6	(New Zealand) Lukas Ramsay	F2	6	7					33
7	(New Zealand) Amy Keighley	5A	8	6					32
8	(New Zealand) Jonty Brensell	5B	4						19
9	(New Zealand) Zeal Jones	5B	9						14

=== Rookie ===
Pos.	Driver Name	Category	(Otago) OTA	(New Zealand) WHA	(New Zealand) SCA	(New Zealand) HAW	(New Zealand) RNZ1	(New Zealand) RNZ2	Points
1	(New Zealand) Lukas Ramsay	N2WD	1	1					50
2	(New Zealand) JP van der Meys	N2WD	2	2					44
3	(New Zealand) Dave Ollis	5A	3						20
4	(New Zealand) Chris Alexander	O2WD	4						19
5	(New Zealand) Mark Pedersen	5A / 5C	5						18
6	(New Zealand) Zeal Jones	5B	6						17

=== Gold Card ===
Pos.	Driver Name	Category	(Otago) OTA	(New Zealand) WHA	(New Zealand) SCA	(New Zealand) HAW	(New Zealand) RNZ1	(New Zealand) RNZ2	Points
1	(New Zealand) Shane Murland	C2WD	1	1					50
2	(New Zealand) Brian Green	4WD	2	2					44
3	(New Zealand) Dave Strong	O2WD	3	3					40
4	(New Zealand) David Taylor	N2WD	4						19
5	(New Zealand) Graeme Coey	C2WD	5						18

=== Manufacturers ===
Pos.	Manufacturer	(Otago) OTA	(New Zealand) WHA	(New Zealand) SCA	(New Zealand) HAW	(New Zealand) RNZ1	(New Zealand) RNZ2	Points
1	(South Korea) Hyundai	1	1					50
2	(United States) Ford	3 ^{1}	5 ^{1}					48
3	(Czech Republic) Skoda	2	2					44
4=	(Japan) Suzuki	4	8 ^{2}					38
4=	(Australia) Holden	5	3					38
6	(Japan) Toyota	8 ^{3}	6					35
7	(Japan) Honda	10 ^{2}	9 ^{3}					34
8	(Japan) Mazda	9	7 ^{4}					32
9	(Japan) Mitsubishi		4					19
10	(Germany) Audi	6						17
11	(Japan) Subaru	7						16

=== Teams ===
==== Category 1-4 ====
Pos.	Team Name	Drivers	Category	(Otago) OTA	(New Zealand) WHA	(New Zealand) SCA	(New Zealand) HAW	(New Zealand) RNZ1	(New Zealand) RNZ2	Points
1	(Wales) Jones Motorsport	(Wales) Anthony Jones	Historic	65	67					132
1	(Wales) Jones Motorsport	(New Zealand) Bryn Jones	N2WD	65	67					132
2	(New Zealand) Paddon Rallysport	(New Zealand) Hayden Paddon	4WD	61	70					131
2	(New Zealand) Paddon Rallysport	(New Zealand) Ari Pettigrew	4WD	61	70					131
3	(New Zealand) Central Region Rallying Fords	(New Zealand) Jackson Clendon	N2WD	54	74					128
3	(New Zealand) Central Region Rallying Fords	(New Zealand) Shane Murland	Historic	54	74					128
4	(New Zealand) North Canterbury	(New Zealand) Robbie Stokes	4WD	68	43					111
4	(New Zealand) North Canterbury	(New Zealand) John Silcock	Historic	68	43					111
5	(New Zealand) Dog and Horses	(New Zealand) Charlie Evans	O2WD	66	23					89
5	(New Zealand) Dog and Horses	(New Zealand) Brent Taylor	O2WD	66	23					89
6	(New Zealand) Team Giltrap	(New Zealand) Ben Hunt	4WD	51	30					81
6	(New Zealand) Team Giltrap	(New Zealand) Dylan Turner	4WD	51	30					81
7	(New Zealand) Back n Black	(New Zealand) Kingsley Jones	4WD	35	37					72
7	(New Zealand) Back n Black	(New Zealand) Raana Horan	4WD	35	37					72
8	(New Zealand) Green, Strong and Gold	(New Zealand) Brian Green	4WD	9	55					64
8	(New Zealand) Green, Strong and Gold	(New Zealand) Dave Strong	O2WD	9	55					64
9	(New Zealand) Team MBOP Fiestas	(New Zealand) Phil Campbell	4WD	30	33					63
9	(New Zealand) Team MBOP Fiestas	(New Zealand) JP van der Meys	N2WD	30	33					63
10	(New Zealand) Super Swift Suzukis	(New Zealand) Emma Gilmour	4WD	26	36					62
10	(New Zealand) Super Swift Suzukis	(New Zealand) Jordan Grant	N2WD	26	36					62
11	(New Zealand) EMSport NZ	(New Zealand) Lukas Ramsay	N2WD	39	19					58
11	(New Zealand) EMSport NZ	(New Zealand) Todd Bawden	4WD	39	19					58
12	(New Zealand) Flooring Performance	(New Zealand) Josh Marston	4WD	4	26					30
12	(New Zealand) Flooring Performance	(New Zealand) Graeme Coey	Historic	4	26					30
13	(New Zealand) Team Toyota	(New Zealand) Jack Hawkeswood	4WD	12	15					27
13	(New Zealand) Team Toyota	(New Zealand) Haydn Mackenzie	5A	12	15					27
14	(New Zealand) Force Motorsport	(New Zealand) Glenn Inkster	4WD	11	12					23
14	(New Zealand) Force Motorsport	(New Zealand) Duncan McCrostie	4WD	11	12					23

==== Category 5 ====
Pos.	Team Name	Drivers	Category	(Otago) OTA	(New Zealand) WHA	(New Zealand) SCA	(New Zealand) HAW	(New Zealand) RNZ1	(New Zealand) RNZ2	Points
1	(New Zealand) Flying S's	(New Zealand) David Sievers	5A	48	52					100
1	(New Zealand) Flying S's	(New Zealand) Brynley Smith	5A	48	52					100
2	(New Zealand) Orange x Rallylife Motorsport	(New Zealand) Sam Byrne	5B	27	35					62
2	(New Zealand) Orange x Rallylife Motorsport	(New Zealand) Jono Shapley	5B	27	35					62
3	(New Zealand) Old and New Subaru	(New Zealand) Jeff Ward	5A	30						30
3	(New Zealand) Old and New Subaru	(Scotland) Sean Haggerty	5A / 5C	30						30
4	(New Zealand) North / Subaru H6	(New Zealand) Paul Cross	5A	18	2					20
4	(New Zealand) North / Subaru H6	(New Zealand) Steve Cox	5A	18	2					20
5	(New Zealand) GC Rally Team	(New Zealand) Zeal Jones	5B	9	Ret					9
5	(New Zealand) GC Rally Team	(New Zealand) Jay Sharp	5A	9	Ret					9
