= MRF (company) =

Indian tyre manufacturing company

MRF Limited

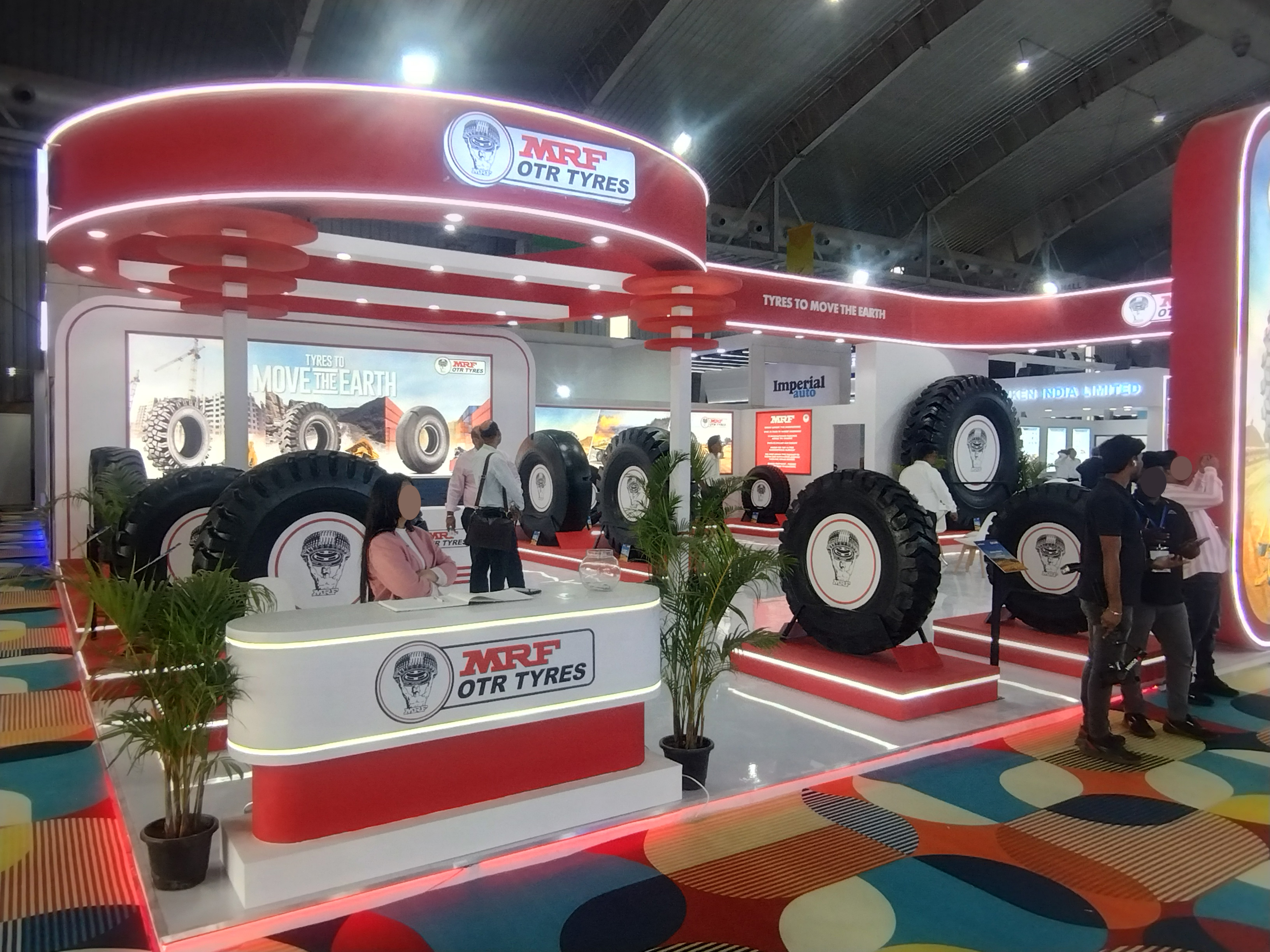
- MRF OTR Tyres at EXCON 2025, (BIEC)
- Type: Public
- Traded as: BSE: 500290; NSE: MRF
- ISIN: INE883A01011
- Industry: Tyres; Rubber products
- Founded: 1946; 80 years ago in Tiruvottiyur, Madras (now Chennai), Tamil Nadu, India
- Founder: K. M. Mammen Mappillai
- Headquarters: Chennai, Tamil Nadu, India
- Area served: Worldwide
- Key people: K. M. Mammen (Chairman); Rahul Mammen Mappillai (MD)
- Products: Tyres; Toys; Sports equipment; Conveyor belt; Paints; Coats
- Revenue: ▲₹31,654 crore (US$3.3 billion) (2026)
- Operating income: ▲₹3,285 crore (US$340 million) (2026)
- Net income: ▲₹2,426 crore (US$250 million) (2026)
- Total assets: ▲₹31,954 crore (US$3.3 billion) (2026)
- Total equity: ▲₹20,975 crore (US$2.2 billion) (2026)
- Number of employees: 17,850 (2025)
- Website: www.mrftyres.com

MRF, or MRF Tyres, is an Indian multinational tyre manufacturing company and the largest manufacturer of tyres in India. It is headquartered in Chennai. The abbreviation MRF comes from the company's initial days when it was called the Madras Rubber Factory. The company manufactures rubber products including tyres, treads, tubes and conveyor belts, paints and toys. MRF was named the world's second-strongest tyre brand by Brand Finance, with a AAA− brand grade.

MRF is also active in cricket and motorsports endorsements; it runs the MRF Pace Foundation and MRF Institute of Driver Development (MIDD) in Chennai.

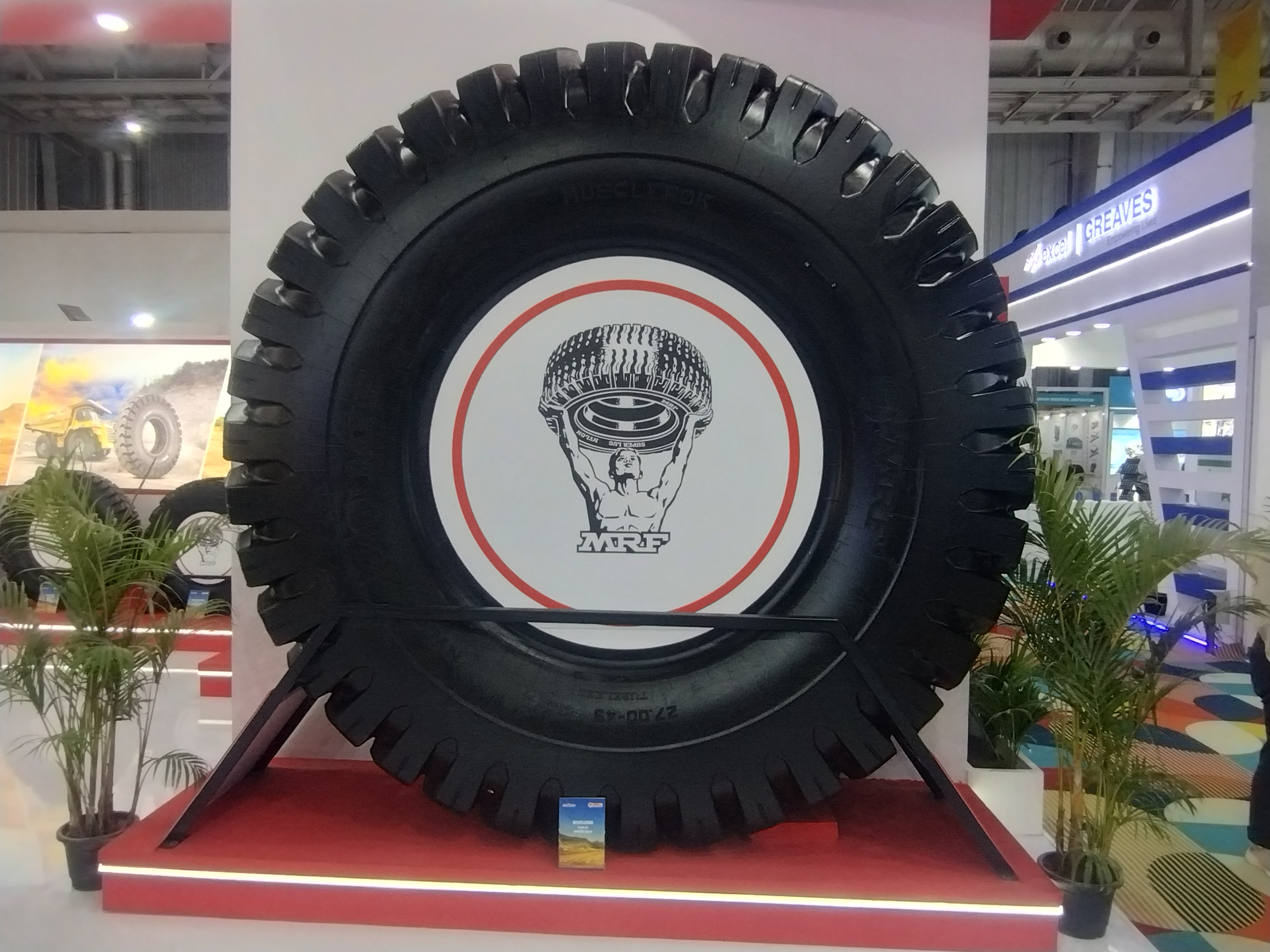
MRF OTR Tyres at EXCON 2025, (BIEC)

== History ==
MRF was started by K. M. Mammen Mappillai as a toy balloon manufacturing unit in 1946 at Tiruvottiyur, Madras (now Chennai). In 1952, the company ventured into the manufacture of tread rubber. Madras Rubber Factory limited was incorporated as a private company in November 1960 and ventured into manufacture of tyres in partnership with Mansfield Tire & Rubber company based in Ohio, United States. The company went public on 1 April 1961 and an office was established in Beirut, Lebanon to develop the export market in 1964 and its current logo of the muscleman was born. In 1967, it became the first Indian company to export tyres to USA.

In 1973, MRF started manufacturing Nylon tyres for the first time. The company entered into with a technical know-how collaboration with B. F. Goodrich in 1978. The Mansfield Tire & Rubber Co sold out its share in 1979 and the name of the company was changed to MRF Ltd in the year. The company finalised a technical collaboration agreement with Marangoni TRS SPA, Italy for the manufacture of pre-cured tread rubber for retreading industry. MRF tyres supplied tyres to Maruti 800, India's first modern small car. In 1989, the company collaborated with Hasbro International, the world's largest toy maker and launched Funskool India. Also, they entered into a pact with Vapocure of Australia to manufacture polyurethane paint formulations and with Italian tyre manufacturer Pirelli for conveyor and elevator belt manufacture. During the year 2004–05, the product range of the company expanded with Go-kart & rally tyres and tyres for two/three wheelers.

== Products ==
MRF manufactures various tyres for passenger cars, two–wheelers, trucks, buses, tractors, light commercial vehicles, off–road vehicles and aircraft, Brands include MRF ZVTS and MRF Wanderers for cars and SUVs; MRF Meteor all terrain tyres; and MRF Steel Muscle for trucks and buses. MRF forayed into tyre retreading in 1970 and manufactures pre-cured retreads (that it calls pretreads) for tyres.

MRF manufactures polyurethane paint formulations and coats used in automotive, decorative and industrial applications. The company also manufactures its in-house brand of Muscleflex conveyor belts.

== Manufacturing facilities ==
1. Kottayam Plant in Kerala
2. Puducherry Plant
3. Goa Plant
4. Perambalur district, Tamil Nadu (Trichy Radial Plant)
5. Perambalur district, Tamil Nadu (Trichy Bias Plant)
6. Arakonam Plant in Tamil Nadu
7. Tiruvottiyur Plant in Chennai, Tamil Nadu
8. Medak Plant in Telangana
9. Ankenpally Plant in Telangana
10. Dahej Plant in Gujarat

The company also manufactures toys at its facility in Goa. The paints and coats are manufactured at two facilities in Chennai, Tamil Nadu.

== Funskool ==
Funskool India was established in 1987 in collaboration with Hasbro toys, US. Funskool manufactures and markets toys, board games among others. It has a manufacturing facility in Goa, India. The company has manufacturing licenses for toys and games from Disney, Warner Brothers, Rummikub etc. Funskool also has partnerships with renowned toy brands such as Hasbro, Lego, Hornby, Ravensburger, Tomy Toys, LeapFrog, Siku Jumbo, and New Bright for manufacturing and marketing in India.

== Motorsports ==
=== MRF Racing ===
MRF built its first Formula 3 car in 1997. MRF in collaboration with Maruti established the Formula Maruti racing, a single-seater, open wheel class motorsport racing event for race cars made in India. MRF Challenge is a Formula 2000 open-wheel motorsport formula based series organised by Madras Motor Sports Club in association with MRF. The latest season consisted of races organised at Madras Motor Racing Track, Chennai, Bahrain International Circuit, Losail International Circuit, Doha and Buddh International Circuit, Noida. Freddie Hunt, son of 1976 Formula One champion James Hunt and Mathias Lauda, son of 1975, 1977 and 1984 Formula One champion Niki Lauda both competed in the series. MRF has sponsored Indian racing drivers including Narain Karthikeyan, Karun Chandok, Ashwin Sundar, N. Leelakrishnan and Raj Bharath.

=== MRF rally team ===
MRF is the first and only Indian manufacturer to have won the Team Championship at the prestigious FIA European Rally Championship, not once, but twice in 2022 and 2023.

MRF have also been a long-running sponsor of an MRF rally team participating in the Asia-Pacific Rally Championship and Indian National Rally Championship. Associating with Czech car manufacturer Škoda, MRF Skoda is the three time reigning champion in the Asia-Pacific Rally Championship with Chris Atkinson winning in 2012, Gaurav Gill in 2013, Jan Kopecký in 2014, Pontus Tidemand in 2015 and Gaurav Gill again in 2016 and 2017. MRF also participates in Raid De Himalaya, the world's highest rally.

MRF entered the European Rally Championship in 2020, with WRC Hyundai driver Craig Breen and Emil Lindholm driving for the team.

MRF remained in ERC for 2021 and also joined several other rally championships. Craig Breen, along with Italian Simone Campedelli are set to participate in European Rally Championship. Campedelli, along with eleven-time Italian rally champion Paolo Andreucci and the 2017 ERC Ladies champion Tamara Molinaro will use the tyres while competing in the Italy Gravel rally championship. Emil Lindholm left ERC and instead will focus entirely on testing the tyres on the gravel roads of Finland. After the 2021 Rally di Roma Capitale, Breen was replaced by other Hyundai drivers, Jari Huttunen and Dani Sordo, as well as Nil Solans later on.

MRF entered Norbert Herczig, Simone Campedelli and the 2021 runner-up Efren Llarena for the 2022 campaign, with Llarena taking his first win during 2022 Rallye Azores.

In 2023, Team MRF Tyres successfully defended their FIA European Rally Championship (ERC) Teams' title with a dominant performance. Latvian driver Martins Sesks, alongside co-driver Renars Francis, secured back-to-back victories at Rally Poland and Rally Liepaja, making Sesks the only driver to win multiple rallies that season. Additional podium finishes by teammates Efrén Llarena and Sara Fernández at Rally Islas Canarias, and consistent performances from Simone Campedelli and Tania Canton, contributed to the team's success. MRF Tyres clinched the championship with two rounds to spare, finishing 54 points ahead of their nearest rivals, BRC Racing Team.

The 2024 season presented new challenges for Team MRF Tyres, who ultimately finished second in the ERC Teams' Championship with 167 points, trailing BRC Racing Team. Despite the setback, the team celebrated a significant victory at the season finale, Rally Silesia in Poland, where Italian driver Andrea Mabellini and co-driver Virginia Lenzi claimed their maiden ERC win. Mabellini's triumph was particularly noteworthy, as he became the first Italian in 13 years to win a European rally outside Italy.

=== MRF Motocross ===
MRF promotes a national motocross championship, a form of all-terrain two wheeler racing held on enclosed off-road circuits annually across several cities.

=== MRF Karting ===
MRF sponsors major karting championships in India. MRF is the first Indian tyre company to develop FIA approved karting tyres.

== Cricket ==
=== MRF Pace Foundation ===
MRF Pace Foundation is a coaching clinic for training fast bowlers established by MRF with the help of former Australian Pace spearhead Dennis Lillee in Chennai, India. Through this program, young aspiring fast bowlers are trained in a special facility. Fast bowlers who trained with foundation and went on to represent the Indian Cricket Team include Javagal Srinath, Irfan Pathan, Munaf Patel, Venkatesh Prasad, R. P. Singh, Zaheer Khan and S Sreesanth. Besides Indian players, foreign players like Chaminda Vaas, Henry Olonga, Heath Streak and Australian fast bowlers Glenn McGrath, Mitchell Johnson and Brett Lee have also trained at the foundation. Sachin Tendulkar in his early days trained in the MRF Pace Foundation to become a fast bowler. Glenn McGrath was appointed director of the Foundation on 2 September 2012, replacing Dennis Lillee, who has held the post since its inception in 1987.

=== Endorsement ===
MRF has been the bat sponsor for many influential cricketers including Sachin Tendulkar, Brian Lara and Steve Waugh. Currently MRF is endorsed by Virat Kohli, and Shubman Gill. MRF has also sponsored Indian batsmen Rohit Sharma, Gautam Gambhir, Sanju Samson, Shikhar Dhawan and Mignon du Preez.

==== Previous endorsements ====
- Sachin Tendulkar – India. Conqueror, Genius, Wizard
- Virat Kohli – India. Conqueror, Genius.
- Brian Lara – West Indies. Genius (previously), Wizard, Wizard 400 (named in honour of the 400 not out he made against England at the Antigua Recreation Ground) in 2004
- Steve Waugh – Australia. Conqueror
- Gautam Gambhir – India. Genius
- Sanju Samson – India. Wizard
- Shikhar Dhawan – India. Genius
- Prithvi Shaw – India. Genius, Prodigy PS 100
- AB de Villiers – South Africa. Genius
- Shubman Gill – India. Genius

=== Sponsorship ===
At IPL 2010, MRF sponsored moored balloons floating above the cricket grounds with a high-definition camera recording live actions of the cricket match. MRF joined as a global partner of International Cricket Council for 2015 Cricket World Cup. In 2017, MRF became the sleeve sponsor for the Premier League clubs Newcastle United, West Ham United F. C. and official tyre partner for West Bromwich Albion.

== Awards and recognition ==
MRF won the JD Power Award for the record 11th time in 2014. The company has won several awards and accolades including the All India Rubber Industries Association's (AIRIA) award for 'Highest Export Awards (Auto Tyre Sector)', 'Top Export Award' from Chemicals & Allied Products Export Promotion Council (CAPEXIL) for 2009–10. In 2014, MRF was ranked 48th among India's most trusted brands according to the Brand Trust Report, a study conducted by Trust Research Advisory.

== Anti competition practices ==
In April 2022, the Competition Commission of India raided the headquarters of MRF along with other tyre companies like Apollo Tyres, CEAT and Continental Tyre at multiple locations. Earlier in February the anti trust watch dog had released a statement about fining these tyre companies a total of Rs 1788 crores (of which MRF fined Rs 622.09 cr.) for sharing price sensitive information among themselves to manage their cartelization of tyre prices for supplies to the public transport corporation of Haryana state. Earlier the All India Tyre Dealers Federation had complained to the Ministry of corporate affairs about this cartelization of these companies to increase the tyre prices. The ministry had then referred the case to the CCI.

== See also ==
- CEAT (company)
- Apollo Tyres
