= Otago Rally =

Annual rallying event in New Zealand

- Status: Active
- Genre: Motorsporting event
- Frequency: Annually
- Locations: Dunedin, Otago, New Zealand
- Country: New Zealand
- Inaugurated: 1976
- Founder: Otago Sports Car Club
- Most recent: 12/04/2026
- Website: OtagoRally.com

The Otago Rally is a gravel rallying event held across the Otago region of New Zealand's South Island, promoted by the Otago Sports Car Club. The first Otago Rally was first held in 1976, and has been run annually since. Regularly hosting the opening round of the New Zealand Rally Championship, the event is known for its fast, undulating public road stages. The rally has historically been held in autumn, with the event currently running early April.

The event is particularly known for the inclusion of the Otago Classic Rally into the event, which comprises pre-1982 two-wheel-drive rally cars. The classic rally has attracted former drivers from the World Rally Championship such as Ari Vatanen, Michèle Mouton, and Mads Ostberg.

== History ==
The Otago Rally was established in 1976, originally named the Shoreline Hotel / 4XO Rally. The original route used forestry roads through the Berwick and Otago Coast forests and was a blind rally. In 1977, the Otago Rally was run twice. The first 1977 running being a club rally which featured as a round of the inaugural Mainland Rally Championship, and the second running in 1977 featuring as round three of the national Pall Mall Rally Championship, For rest of the 70s the Otago Rally was run as a club rally.

Throughout the 1980s the Otago Rally switched between running a club rally, and running as a round of either the national New Zealand Rally Championship, or the local Mainland Rally Championship. Throughout the 1980s the rally would use roads through the Flagstaff, Berwick, and Coast Forests.

In the 1990s the Otago Rally shifted to use closed public roads instead of the forestry roads used in the 70s and the 80s. The 1993 rally was the first to be officially named the Otago Rally, and from 1993 onward the rally featured as a regular round on the Mainland Rally Championship, and the New Zealand Rally Championship. The 1997 Otago Rally saw the first inclusion of the 2WD Otago Classic Rally being run alongside the Otago Rally event.

The 2000 event saw the first use of safety notes (pacenotes) by the main field in the Otago Rally. The 2002 event saw the introduction of reconnaissance for crews using safety notes. The use of safety notes was not allowed in the Otago Classic Rally until the 2005 event. The 2006 event saw the split of the main rally into a national championship field, and an allcomers field.

In 2018 the Otago Rally introduced the 4WD Otago Classic Rally. In 2019 the event became a qualifying round of Asia-Pacific Rally Championship (APRC), and has continued to be an APRC championship round since. The 2020 event was cancelled due to the COVID-19 pandemic, this being the only year an Otago Rally was not run. The 2026 Otago Rally served as the event's 50th running.

== Otago Rally Winners ==
=== Overall ===
Rally Name	Date	Driver	Co-Driver	Car	Ref.
Shoreline Motor Hotel / 4XO Rally	17.04.1976	(New Zealand) Trevor Crowe	(New Zealand) Austin Cole	Datsun 1200	
Shoreline Motor Hotel / 4XO Rally	09.04.1977	(New Zealand) Ian Begg		Mazda RX3	
Paul Mall Rally	02.07.1977	(New Zealand) Rod Millen	(New Zealand) Mike Franchi	Mazda RX3	
Shoreline Motor Hotel / 4XO Rally	08.04.1978	(New Zealand) Bill Pottinger	Barry Boyd	Ford Escort Mexico 1600	
Read Datsun Rally	05.04.1979	(New Zealand) Ian Begg		Mazda RX3	
Read Datsun Rally	08.11.1980	(New Zealand) Carl Rabbidge	(New Zealand) Kevin Morrison	Ford Escort RS 2000	
Shoreline Motor Hotel Easter Rally	18.04.1981	(New Zealand) Barry Robinson	(New Zealand) Geoff Lange	Vauxhall Chevette	
Shoreline Motor Hotel Easter Rally	10.04.1982	(New Zealand) Barry Robinson	(New Zealand) Geoff Lange	Vauxhall Chevette	
Shoreline Motor Hotel Otago Easter Rally	02.04.1983	(New Zealand) Barry Robinson	(New Zealand) Geoff Lange	Vauxhall Chevette	
Read Nissan Rally	17.11.1984	(New Zealand) Peter Robb	(New Zealand) Trevor Stark	Datsun 1200	
Shoreline Motor Hotel / Read Nissan Rally	28.09.1985	(New Zealand) Dave Brownlie	Gordon Park	Mazda RX3	
Read Nissan Rally	20.09.1986	(New Zealand) Larry Timpany	Warren Egan	Subaru Leone RX	
Shoreline Motor Hotel Rally	12.09.1987	(New Zealand) Roger Townsend	(New Zealand) Geoff Adams	Ford Escort RS 1800 MKII	
Shoreline Motor Hotel Rally	23.04.1988	(New Zealand) Brian Stokes	(New Zealand) Ian Latham	Ford Sierra XR 4WD	
Shoreline Motor Hotel Rally	12.04.1989	(New Zealand) Simon Davies	(New Zealand) John Kennard	Subaru RX 4WD Turbo	
Shoreline Motor Hotel Rally	30.09.1990	(New Zealand) Mark Leonard	(New Zealand) Hayden Morris	Mazda 323 4WD Turbo	
Shoreline Motor Hotel Rally	07.09.1991	(New Zealand) Barry Robinson	Wade Paterson	Vauxhall Chevette	
Leisure Lodge Rally	18.07.1992	(New Zealand) Deane Buist	(New Zealand) Conrad Smith	Mazda 323 4WD	
Leisure Lodge Rally	28.08.1993	(New Zealand) John Silcock	(New Zealand) Robert Webster	Mazda 323 4WD	
Turfus Motor Court Rally	16.04.1994	(New Zealand) Brian Stokes	(New Zealand) Jeff Judd	Ford Escort RS Cosworth	
Shoreline Motor Hotel Rally	26-27.04.1995	(New Zealand) Greg Graham	(New Zealand) Jim Robb	Subaru Impreza 555	
Shoreline Motor Hotel Rally	24-25.05.1996	(New Zealand) Joe McAndrew	(New Zealand) Bob Haldane	Subaru Legacy RS 555	
Shoreline Motor Hotel Rally	16-17.05.1997	(New Zealand) Geoff Argyle	(New Zealand) Raymond Bennett	Mitsubushi Lancer Evo 4	
Shoreline Motor Hotel Rally	16-17.05.1998	(New Zealand) Joe McAndrew	(New Zealand) Christopher Boyle	Subaru Impreza 555	
Shoreline Motor Hotel Rally	15-16.05.1999	(New Zealand) Bruce Herbert	(New Zealand) Robert Ryan	Mitsubishi Lancer Evo 6	
Shoreline Motor Hotel Rally	20-21.05.2000	(New Zealand) Bruce Herbert	(New Zealand) Robert Ryan	Mitsubishi Lancer Evo 6	
Southern Motor Court Subaru Rally	19-20.05.2001	(New Zealand) Chris West	(New Zealand) Chris Cobham	Mitsubishi Lancer Evo 5	
Shoreline Motor Hotel / 4XO Rally	11-12.05.2002	(New Zealand) Bruce Herbert	(New Zealand) Robert Ryan	Subaru Impreza WRX	
Southern Motor Court Subaru Rally	10-11.05.2003	(New Zealand) Todd Bawden	(New Zealand) Damon McLachlan	Mitsubishi Lancer Evo 6	
Southern Motor Court ODT Otago Rally	22-23.05.2004	(New Zealand) Chris West	(New Zealand) Garry Cowan	Subaru Impreza WRX STi	
Otago Daily Times Otago Rally	14-15.05.2005	(New Zealand) Chris West	(New Zealand) Garry Cowan	Subaru Impreza WRX STi	
Otago Daily Times Otago Rally	5-7.05.2006	(New Zealand) Chris West	(New Zealand) Garry Cowan	Subaru Impreza WRX STi	
Otago Daily Times Otago Rally	14-15.04.2007	(New Zealand) Richard Mason	(New Zealand) Sara Mason	Subaru Impreza WRX	
Otago Rally	10-11.05.2008	(New Zealand) Richard Mason	(New Zealand) Sara Mason	Subaru Impreza WRX	
Otago Rally	16-17.05.2009	(New Zealand) Hayden Paddon	(New Zealand) John Kennard	Mitsubishi Lancer Evo 9	
Otago Rally	10-11.04.2010	(New Zealand) Dean Sumner	(New Zealand) Paul Fallon	Mitsubishi Lancer Evo 9	
Drivesouth Otago Rally	8-10.04.2011	(New Zealand) Hayden Paddon	(New Zealand) John Kennard	Subaru Impreza WRX	
Drivesouth Otago Rally	25-27.05.2012	(New Zealand) Richard Mason	(New Zealand) Sara Mason	Subaru Impreza WRX STi	
Drivesouth Otago Rally	6-7.04.2013	(New Zealand) Hayden Paddon	(New Zealand) John Kennard	Mitsubishi Lancer Evo 9	
Drivesouth Otago Rally	10-11.05.2014	(New Zealand) Richard Mason	(New Zealand) Sara Mason	Subaru Impreza WRX STi	
Drivesouth Otago Rally	9-10.05.2015	(New Zealand) Hayden Paddon	(New Zealand) John Kennard	Ford Escort RS 1800 MKII	
Drivesouth Otago Rally	9-10.04.2016	(New Zealand) Hayden Paddon	(New Zealand) John Kennard	Hyundai i20 AP4	
Drivesouth Otago Rally	8-9.04.2017	(New Zealand) David Holder	(New Zealand) Jason Farmer	Hyundai i20 AP4+	
Drivesouth Otago Rally	14-15.04.2018	(New Zealand) Hayden Paddon	(New Zealand) John Kennard	Hyundai i20 AP4+	
Drivesouth Otago Rally	13-14.04.2019	(New Zealand) Hayden Paddon	(New Zealand) John Kennard	Hyundai i20 AP4+	
2020 Cancelled - COVID-19
Drivesouth Otago Rally	17-18.04.2021	(New Zealand) Hayden Paddon	(New Zealand) John Kennard	Hyundai i20 AP4+	
Drivesouth Otago Rally	9-10.04.2022	(New Zealand) Hayden Paddon	(New Zealand) John Kennard	Hyundai i20 AP4+	
Drivesouth Otago Rally	1-2.04.2023	(New Zealand) Hayden Paddon	(New Zealand) John Kennard	Hyundai 120N Rally2	
Central Machine Hire Otago Rally	13-14.04.2024	(New Zealand) Jack Hawkeswood	(New Zealand) Jason Farmer	Toyota GR Yaris AP4	
Central Machine Hire Otago Rally	5-6.04.2025	(New Zealand) Ben Hunt	(New Zealand) Tony Rawstorn	Skoda Fabia Rally2 Evo	
Central Machine Hire Otago Rally	11-12.04.2026	(New Zealand) Jack Stokes	(New Zealand) Hayden Graves	Skoda Fabia Rally2 Evo	
Central Machine Hire Otago Rally	10-11.04.2027	Event To Be Held			

==== Multiple Winners ====
===== Drivers =====
Wins	Driver	Years
10	(New Zealand) Hayden Paddon	2009, 2011, 2013, 2015–2016, 2018–2019, 2021–2023
4	(New Zealand) Barry Robbinson	1981–1983, 1991
4	(New Zealand) Chris West	2001, 2004–2006
4	(New Zealand) Richard Mason	2007–2008, 2012, 2014
3	(New Zealand) Bruce Herbert	1999–2000, 2002
2	(New Zealand) Ian Begg	1977, 1979
2	(New Zealand) Brian Stokes	1988, 1994
2	(New Zealand) Joe McAndrew	1996, 1998

===== Co-Drivers =====
Wins	Co-Driver	Years
11	(New Zealand) John Kennard	1989, 2009, 2011, 2013, 2015–2016, 2018–2019, 2021–2023
4	(New Zealand) Sara Mason	2007–2008, 2012, 2014
3	(New Zealand) Geoff Lange	1981–1983
3	(New Zealand) Robert Ryan	1999–2000, 2002
3	(New Zealand) Garry Cowan	2004–2006
2	(New Zealand) Jason Farmer	2017, 2024

=== 2WD Otago Classic Rally Winners ===
Rally Name	Date	Driver	Co-Driver	Car	Ref.
Shoreline Motor Hotel Rally	16-17.05.1997	(New Zealand) Allan Wills	(New Zealand) Peter Fridd	Ford Escort	
Shoreline Motor Hotel Rally	16-17.05.1998	(New Zealand) Jeff Judd	(New Zealand) James Cowles	Ford Escort RS 1800 MKII	
Shoreline Motor Hotel Rally	15-16.05.1999	(New Zealand) Brent Rawstron	(New Zealand) Ian McKee	Ford Escort RS 1800 MKII	
Shoreline Motor Hotel Rally	20-21.05.2000	(New Zealand) Gary Adock	(New Zealand) Mark Dalton	Triumph TR7 V8	
Southern Motor Court Subaru Rally	19-20.05.2001	(New Zealand) Brent Buist	(New Zealand) Glenn Buist	Ford Escort RS 1800 MKII	
Shoreline Motor Hotel / 4XO Rally	11-12.05.2002	(New Zealand) Brain Stokes	(New Zealand) Shayne O'Hagen	Ford Escort RS 1800 MKII	
Southern Motor Court Subaru Rally	10-11.05.2003	(New Zealand) Brain Stokes	(New Zealand) Bryce Biggs	Ford Escort RS 1800 MKII	
Southern Motor Court ODT Otago Rally	22-23.05.2004	(Finland) Pasi Hagström	(New Zealand) Ian McKee	Ford Escort RS 1800 MKII	
Otago Daily Times Otago Rally	14-15.05.2005	(New Zealand) Jimmy McRae	(New Zealand) Gary Smith	Ford Escort RS 1800 MKII	
Otago Daily Times Otago Rally	5-7.05.2006	(Finland) Pasi Hagström	(New Zealand) Ian McKee	Ford Escort RS 1800 MKII	
Otago Daily Times Otago Rally	14-15.04.2007	(New Zealand) Deane Buist	(New Zealand) Rocky Hudson	Ford Escort RS 1800 MKII	
Otago Rally	10-11.05.2008	(Finland) Pasi Hagström	(New Zealand) Ian McKee	Porsche 911 Carrera RS	
Otago Rally	16-17.05.2009	(New Zealand) Derek Ayson	(New Zealand) Greg Scott	Ford Escort MkII	
Otago Rally	10-11.04.2010	(New Zealand) Derek Ayson	(New Zealand) Greg Scott	Ford Escort MkII	
Drivesouth Otago Rally	8-10.04.2011	(New Zealand) Derek Ayson	(New Zealand) Greg Scott	Ford Escort MkII	
Drivesouth Otago Rally	25-27.05.2012	(New Zealand) Marcus Van Klink	(New Zealand) Dave Neill	Mazda RX-7	
Drivesouth Otago Rally	6-7.04.2013	(Australia) Neal Bates	(Australia) Coral Taylor	Toyota Celica 2000 GT	
Drivesouth Otago Rally	10-11.05.2014	(Australia) Neal Bates	(Australia) Coral Taylor	Toyota Celica RA40	
Drivesouth Otago Rally	9-10.05.2015	(New Zealand) Hayden Paddon	(New Zealand) John Kennard	Ford Escort RS 1800 MKII	
Drivesouth Otago Rally	9-10.04.2016	(Estonia) Markko Märtin	(Belgium) Stéphane Prévot	Ford Escort RS 1800 MKII	
Drivesouth Otago Rally	8-9.04.2017	(Estonia) Markko Märtin	(Belgium) Stéphane Prévot	Ford Escort RS 1800 MKII	
Drivesouth Otago Rally	14-15.04.2018	(New Zealand) Regan Ross	(New Zealand) Samantha Gray	Ford Escort RS 1800 MKII	
Drivesouth Otago Rally	13-14.04.2019	(Norway) Mads Østberg	(Norway) Torstein Eriksen	Ford Escort RS 1800 MKII	
2020 Cancelled - COVID-19
Drivesouth Otago Rally	17-18.04.2021	(New Zealand) Deane Buist	(Philippines) Karl Celeste	VW Golf Mk2 GTi	
Drivesouth Otago Rally	9-10.04.2022	(New Zealand) Deane Buist	(Philippines) Karl Celeste	Toyota Celica	
Drivesouth Otago Rally	1-2.04.2023	(Finland) Mikko Hirvonen	(Finland) Jarno Ottman	Ford Escort RS 1800 MKII	
Central Machine Hire Otago Rally	13-14.04.2024	(United Kingdom) Kris Meeke	(Republic of Ireland) Noel O'Sullivan	Ford Escort RS 1800 MKII	
Central Machine Hire Otago Rally	5-6.04.2025	(New Zealand) Deane Buist	(Philippines) Karl Celeste	Ford Escort RS 1800 MKII	
Central Machine Hire Otago Rally	11-12.04.2026	(United Kingdom) Kris Meeke	(United Kingdom) Stuart Loudon	Ford Escort RS 1800 MKII	
Central Machine Hire Otago Rally	10-11.04.2027	Event To Be Held			

==== Multiple Winners ====
===== Drivers =====
Wins	Driver	Years
4	(New Zealand) Deane Buist	2007, 2021, 2022, 2025
3	(Finland) Pasi Hagström	2004, 2006, 2008
3	(New Zealand) Derek Ayson	2009–2011
2	(New Zealand) Brian Stokes	2002–2003
2	(Australia) Neal Bates	2013–2014
2	(Estonia) Markko Märtin	2016–2017
2	(United Kingdom) Kris Meeke	2024, 2026

===== Co-Drivers =====
Wins	Co-Driver	Years
4	(New Zealand) Ian McKee	1999, 2004, 2006, 2008
3	(New Zealand) Greg Scott	2009–2011
3	(Philippines) Karl Celeste	2021–2022, 2025
2	(Australia) Coral Taylor	2013–2014
2	(Belgium) Stéphane Prévot	2016–2017

=== Otago Rally Allcomers Winners ===
Rally Name	Date	Driver	Co-Driver	Car	Ref.
Otago Daily Times Otago Rally	5-7.05.2006	(New Zealand) Greg Teece	(New Zealand) Andree Beattie	Mitsubishi Lancer Evo 6	
Otago Daily Times Otago Rally	14-15.04.2007	(New Zealand) Andrew Hawkeswood	(New Zealand) Glen Goldring	Mitsubishi Lancer Evo 6.5	
Otago Rally	10-11.05.2008	(New Zealand) Greg Teece	(New Zealand) Rocky Hudson	Mitsubishi Lancer Evo 6.5	
Otago Rally	16-17.05.2009	(New Zealand) Kieran Hall	(New Zealand) Peter Hart	Subaru Impreza WRX	
Otago Rally	10-11.04.2010	(New Zealand) Andrew Graves	(New Zealand) Timothy Driscoll	Mitsubishi Lancer Evo 3	
Drivesouth Otago Rally	8-10.04.2011	(New Zealand) Andrew Hawkeswood	(New Zealand) Rocky Hudson	Audi Quattro	
Drivesouth Otago Rally	25-27.05.2012	(New Zealand) Rhys Gardner	(Scotland) Ally Mackay	Mitsubishi Lancer Evo 7	
Drivesouth Otago Rally	6-7.04.2013	(New Zealand) Dean Bond	(New Zealand) Ross Moody	Mitsubishi Lancer Evo 6.5	
Drivesouth Otago Rally	10-11.05.2014	(New Zealand) Carter Strang	(New Zealand) Stewart Robbie	Mitsubishi Lancer Evo 6	
Drivesouth Otago Rally	9-10.05.2015	(New Zealand) Paul Dickson	(New Zealand) Andree Beattie	Mitsubishi Lancer Evo 3 RS	
Drivesouth Otago Rally	9-10.04.2016	(New Zealand) Deane Buist	(Philippines) Karl Celeste	Ford Escort RS 1800 MKII	
Drivesouth Otago Rally	8-9.04.2017	(New Zealand) Deane Buist	(Philippines) Karl Celeste	Ford Escort RS 1800 MKII	
Drivesouth Otago Rally	14-15.04.2018	(New Zealand) Grant Blackberry	(United Kingdom) Ric Chalmers	Mitsubishi Lancer Evo X	
Drivesouth Otago Rally	13-14.04.2019	(New Zealand) Jack Williamson	(New Zealand) Brenda Williamson	Subaru Impreza STi R4	
2020 Cancelled - COVID-19
Drivesouth Otago Rally	17-18.04.2021	(New Zealand) Andy Martin	(New Zealand) Matt Hayward	Subaru Impreza WRX	
Drivesouth Otago Rally	9-10.04.2022	(New Zealand) Regan Ross	(New Zealand) Katrina Renshaw	Ford Fiesta R5	
Drivesouth Otago Rally	1-2.04.2023	(New Zealand) Marcus van Klink	(New Zealand) Toby Marsh	Mazda RX8	
Central Machine Hire Otago Rally	13-14.04.2024	(New Zealand) Caleb MacDonald	(Australia) Larisa Biggar	Mitsubishi Lancer Evo 6	
Central Machine Hire Otago Rally	5-6.04.2025	(New Zealand) James Worker	(New Zealand) Mags Marshall	Mitsubishi Lancer Evo 6	
Central Machine Hire Otago Rally	11-12.04.2026	(New Zealand) Emma Gilmour	(New Zealand) Ben Searcy	Citroën C3 Rally2	
Central Machine Hire Otago Rally	10-11.04.2027	Event To Be Held			

==== Multiple Winners ====
===== Drivers =====
Wins	Driver	Years
2	(New Zealand) Greg Teece	2006, 2008
2	(New Zealand) Andrew Hawkeswood	2004, 2006, 2008
2	(New Zealand) Deane Buist	2016–2017

===== Co-Drivers =====
Wins	Co-Driver	Years
2	(New Zealand) Andree Beattie	2006, 2015
2	(New Zealand) Rocky Hudson	2008, 2011
2	(Philippines) Karl Celeste	2016–2017

=== 4WD Otago Classic Rally Winners ===
Rally Name	Date	Driver	Co-Driver	Car	Ref.
Drivesouth Otago Rally	14-15.04.2018	(New Zealand) Ray Wilson	(New Zealand) Len Fisher	Audi Quattro S2 Coupe	
Drivesouth Otago Rally	13-14.04.2019	(New Zealand) Ray Wilson	(New Zealand) Brenda Williamson	Audi Quattro S2 Coupe	
2020 Cancelled - COVID-19
Drivesouth Otago Rally	17-18.04.2021	(New Zealand) Matthew Wright	(New Zealand) Stephen Lloyd	Subaru Impreza STi	
Drivesouth Otago Rally	9-10.04.2022	(New Zealand) Steve Cox	(New Zealand) Laurie Brensell	Subaru Impreza H6	
Drivesouth Otago Rally	1-2.04.2023	(New Zealand) Paul Cross	(New Zealand) Janey Blair	Subaru Impreza H6	
Central Machine Hire Otago Rally	13-14.04.2024	(New Zealand) Andrew Graves	(New Zealand) Hayden Graves	Mitsubishi Lancer Evo 3	
Central Machine Hire Otago Rally	5-6.04.2025	(New Zealand) Tim Smith	(New Zealand) Ben Trevelyan	Subaru Impreza H6	
Central Machine Hire Otago Rally	11-12.04.2026	(New Zealand) Thomas Paul	(New Zealand) Bridget Airey	Subaru Impreza H6	
Central Machine Hire Otago Rally	10-11.04.2027	Event To Be Held			

==== Multiple Winners ====
===== Drivers =====
Wins	Driver	Years
2	(New Zealand) Ray Wilson	2018–2019
