= Song Erwei =

Chinese oncologist

- 宋尔卫
- Born: April 1970 (age 56); Heshan, Guangdong, China
- Education: Sun Yat-sen University; University of Duisburg-Essen
- Scientific career
- Fields: Oncology
- Workplaces: Second Affiliated Hospital of Sun Yat-sen University

Chinese name
- Traditional Chinese: 宋爾衛
- Simplified Chinese: 宋尔卫
Transcriptions
Standard Mandarin
- Hanyu Pinyin: Sòng Ěrwèi

Song Erwei (Chinese: 宋尔卫; born April 1970) is a Chinese oncologist currently serving as Director of Sun Yat-sen University's Medical Department (Sun Yat-sen University of Medical Sciences). He previously served as President of Sun Yat-sen Memorial Hospital (Canton Hospital) from 2016 until his resignation in February 2026.

== Education ==
Song was born in Heshan, Guangdong in April 1970. His father is an English teacher. He primarily studied at Chaotianlu School and secondary studied at Guangzhou No. 2 High School.

In 1988, he was admitted to the seven-year clinical medicine program (combined Bachelor of Medicine and Master of Medicine degree track) at Sun Yat-sen Medical University. After completing the program, he began clinical work in general surgery at the Second Affiliated Hospital of Sun Yat-sen Medical University (now Sun Yat-sen Memorial Hospital), where he trained under Professor Su Fengxi, a specialist in breast cancer.

After graduating from Sun Yat-sen University in 1995, he became a surgeon at the Second Affiliated Hospital of Sun Yat-sen University. In 1999, he was sent abroad to study at the University of Duisburg-Essen at the expense of the Chinese government, where he obtained his Doctor of Medicine degree. In 2002, he joined Harvard Medical School as a postdoctoral fellow.

== Career ==
In 2003, Song co-authored a study in Nature Medicine demonstrating that RNA interference could be used to silence disease-causing genes in animal models. This research provided early evidence supporting the therapeutic potential of RNA-based treatments.

After returning to China, he worked at the Second Affiliated Hospital of Sun Yat-sen University. In 2010, he became Director of the hospital's Breast Cancer Center. His research on non-coding RNAs in tumor progression and chemoresistance gained national recognition, leading to a State Natural Science Award (Second Class) in 2015. In 2016, he was appointed President of Sun Yat-sen Memorial Hospital. In 2017, he was elected a member of the Standing Committee of the 14th Central Committee of Jiusan Society. In 2018 he became a delegate to the 13th National People's Congress.

In November 2023, Sun Yat-sen Memorial Hospital confirmed that three staff members who worked or studied at its breast cancer center laboratory under the supervision of Song, were diagnosed with cancer, including synovial sarcoma and pancreatic cancer. The hospital stated that two of the individuals had left Guangzhou in April 2022. The China Association for Science and Technology called for a professional investigation into whether the lab environment was linked to the diagnoses with the lab subsequently being closed.

In January 2025, he was appointed to Hong Kong Baptist University's (HKBU) expert advisory committee for its proposed medical school, but resigned after only two days following public criticism over concerns of academic integrity. Students at HKBU posted notices on campus opposing the appointment of a "tainted scholar." Ultimately, Hong Kong University of Science and Technology (HKUST) won the government bid to establish Hong Kong's third medical school in November 2025, beating out HKBU and Hong Kong Polytechnic University.

In February 2026, Song stepped down as President of Sun Yat-sen Memorial Hospital after a decade in the role, though he continues to serve as Director of Sun Yat-sen University's Medical Department.

== Controversy ==
Lab safety incident

Under the supervision of Song at the Sun Yat-sen Memorial Hospital several members of his team composed of three doctors and a post-doctoral student all under 30 years old, were diagnosed with rare forms of cancer. The lab studies cancer development mechanisms through the use of cancer inducing agents tested on animal models. As a result, the lab was closed on November 8 over concerns of researcher safety.

=== Allegations of research misconduct and academic integrity ===
From 2003 to 2019, multiple papers co-authored or supervised by Academician Song Erwei were flagged for image duplication and related issues. A paper co-authored by his son Song Shijian (then a high school student) and his student Su Shicheng was also cited for image duplication.

In 2022, Song Shijian was admitted to a medical master's program at the Second Affiliated Hospital of Sun Yat-sen University, where his initial National Postgraduate Entrance Examination score of 370 was the lowest among the 11 admitted students. However, his posted repeat scores rose over a short period of time to the highest score in the re-examination, 477.83 points, ranking third overall drawing attention to the integrity of the admission process.

=== Tsinghua university lecture incident ===
On December 19, 2024, Song Erwei delivered a lecture at Tsinghua University, where he was questioned by a Peking University student regarding allegations of image duplication in his research papers and his role in a close relative's high school publication of SCI papers. Following the lecture, students from Tsinghua High School tore down Song's promotional poster.

== Honours and awards ==
- State Natural Science Award (Second Class)
- Science and Technology Award of the Ho Leung Ho Lee Foundation
- November 22, 2019 Member of the Chinese Academy of Sciences (CAS)
- Asian Scientist 100, Asian Scientist, 2023
