= SCIS =

SCIS may refer to:

- Schools Catalogue Information Service, Australia
- SCIS, the ICAO code for Puerto Sur Airport, Chile
- Scis (album), a 2020 studio album by Oval
- Scottish Council of Independent Schools, United Kingdom
- Shanghai Community International School, China
- Southern Center for International Studies, United States

== See also ==
- SCI (disambiguation)
