= New Zealand Rally Championship =

- Category: Rallying
- Country: New Zealand
- Inaugural season: 1977
- Tyre suppliers: (India) MRF Tyres
- Drivers' champion: (New Zealand) Jack Hakweswood
- Co-Drivers' champion: (New Zealand) Jason Farmer
- Makes' champion: (Japan) Toyota
- Teams' champion: (New Zealand) Team Sth Auckland Car Club
- Official website: nzrallychampionship.co.nz

The New Zealand Rally Championship (NZRC) is New Zealand's leading rallying championship. A multi-event national championship has been held each year since 1977.

Today the championship is held for a variety of classes based on engine capacity and further split by four or two wheel drive. The top class for a number of years has been the CAT1 class, featuring R5, NR4, Rally2, and AP4 cars.

The New Zealand Rally Championship has been a launching pad for the career of many New Zealand drivers. Rod Millen, Possum Bourne, and Hayden Paddon being the most notable. In the 2000s Hayden used the series as a springboard to international competition, competing in the Asia-Pacific Rally Championship before moving on to the Production, Super 2000 World Rally Championship, and World Rally Championships. Most recently Zeal Jones has used the series to gain valuable skills and experience to get a spot in the Toyota GAZOO Racing WRC Challenge Program.

The championship was formed around the then newly created Rally New Zealand when it joined the World Rally Championship in 1973. Since then Rally New Zealand has frequently been the starring event of the NZRC and the event is current based in Auckland.

The Otago Rally and International Rally of Whangarei are also rounds of the NZRC as well as being rounds of the Asia-Pacific Rally Championship. The current 2026 championship also has events based in Canterbury, Southland, Hawke's Bay, and Bay of Plenty regions.

== 2026 Calendar ==
Round	Date	Rally	Organising Club	Rally Headquarters	Surface	Stages	Competitive Distance	Ref.
1	10–12 April	Otago Rally	Otago Sports Car Club	Dunedin, Otago, New Zealand	Gravel	16	284.26 km	
2	31 May	Canterbury Rally	Autosport Car Club	Rangiora, Canterbury, New Zealand	Gravel	9	128.75 km	
3	18 July	Rally Southland	Eastern Southland Car Club	Invercargill, Southland, New Zealand	Gravel	7	159.20 km	
4	22 August	Rally Hawke's Bay	Hawke's Bay Car Club	Napier, Hawke's Bay, New Zealand	Gravel	5	122.72 km	
5	25-27 September	Rally of Whangarei	Rally New Zealand Club Inc	Whangarei, Northland, New Zealand	Gravel	18	288.51 km	
6	31 October	Rally Bay of Plenty	MotorSport Bay of Plenty Inc	Tauranga, Bay of Plenty, New Zealand	Gravel	9	162.18 km	

== Champions ==
=== Gold Star Rally Champions ===
Year	Driver	Vehicle	Co-Driver	Vehicle
1977	(New Zealand) Rod Millen	Mazda RX-3		
1978	(New Zealand) Blair Robson	Ford Escort RS1800		
1979	(New Zealand) Paul Adams	Ford Escort RS1800		
1980	(New Zealand) Jim Donald	Ford Escort RS1800		
1981	(New Zealand) Jim Donald	Ford Escort RS1800		
1982	(New Zealand) Tony Teesdale	Ford Escort RS1800		
1983	(New Zealand) Malcolm Stewart	Ford Escort RS1800		
1984	(New Zealand) Tony Teesdale	Nissan 240RS		
1985	(New Zealand) Brian Stokes	Ford Escort RS		
1986	(New Zealand) Neil Allport	Mazda RX-7		
1987	(New Zealand) Tony Teesdale	MG Metro 6R4	(New Zealand) Greg Horne	MG Metro 6R4
1988	(New Zealand) Brian Stokes	Ford Sierra 4x4	(New Zealand) Robert Haldane	Ford Sierra 4x4
1989	(New Zealand) Neil Allport	Mazda 323 4WD	(New Zealand) Robert Haldane	Mazda 323 4WD
1990	(New Zealand) David Ayling	Mazda 323 4WD	(New Zealand) Robert Haldane	Mazda 323 4WD
1991	(New Zealand) Possum Bourne	Subaru Legacy	(New Zealand) Rodger Freeth	Subaru Legacy
1992	(New Zealand) Neil Allport	Mazda 323 GTX	(New Zealand) Jim Robb	Mazda 323 GTX
1993	(New Zealand) Joe McAndrew	Subaru Legacy	(New Zealand) Robert Haldane	Subaru Legacy
1994	(New Zealand) Joe McAndrew	Subaru Legacy	(New Zealand) Robert Haldane	Subaru Legacy
1995	(New Zealand) Reece Jones	Mitsubishi Lancer Evolution	(New Zealand) Leo Bult	Mitsubishi Lancer Evolution
1996	(New Zealand) Joe McAndrew	Subaru Legacy	(New Zealand) Robert Haldane	Subaru Legacy
1997	(New Zealand) Reece Jones	Mitsubishi Lancer Evolution	(New Zealand) Leo Bult	Mitsubishi Lancer Evolution
1998	(New Zealand) Geoff Argyle	Mitsubishi Lancer Evolution	(New Zealand) Alan Glen	Mitsubishi Lancer Evolution
1999	(New Zealand) Geoff Argyle	Mitsubishi Lancer Evolution	(New Zealand) Rob Ryan	Mitsubishi Lancer Evolution
2000	(New Zealand) Bruce Herbert	Mitsubishi Lancer Evolution	(New Zealand) Rob Ryan	Mitsubishi Lancer Evolution
2001	(New Zealand) Bruce Herbert	Subaru Impreza WRX	(New Zealand) Rob Ryan	Subaru Impreza WRX
2002	(New Zealand) Bruce Herbert	Subaru Impreza WRX	(New Zealand) Rob Ryan	Subaru Impreza WRX
2003	(New Zealand) Bruce Herbert	Subaru Impreza WRX	(New Zealand) Rob Ryan	Subaru Impreza WRX
2004	(New Zealand) Chris West	Subaru Impreza WRX	(New Zealand) Garry Cowan	Subaru Impreza WRX
2005	(New Zealand) Richard Mason	Subaru Impreza WRX	(New Zealand) Garry Cowan	Subaru Impreza WRX
2006	(New Zealand) Richard Mason	Subaru Impreza WRX	(New Zealand) Sara Randall	Subaru Impreza WRX
2007	(New Zealand) Sam Murray	Subaru Impreza WRX	(New Zealand) Rob Ryan	Subaru Impreza WRX
2008	(New Zealand) Hayden Paddon	Mitsubishi Lancer Evolution	(New Zealand) John Kennard	Mitsubishi Lancer Evolution
2009	(New Zealand) Hayden Paddon	Mitsubishi Lancer Evolution	(New Zealand) John Kennard	Mitsubishi Lancer Evolution
2010	(New Zealand) Dean Sumner	Mitsubishi Lancer Evolution	(New Zealand) Paul Fallon	Mitsubishi Lancer Evolution
2011	(New Zealand) Richard Mason	Subaru Impreza WRX	(New Zealand) Sara Mason	Subaru Impreza WRX
2012	(New Zealand) Richard Mason	Subaru Impreza WRX	(New Zealand) Sara Mason	Subaru Impreza WRX
2013	(New Zealand) Hayden Paddon	Mitsubishi Lancer Evo IX	(New Zealand) John Kennard	Mitsubishi Lancer Evo IX
2014	(New Zealand) Richard Mason	Subaru Impreza WRX	(New Zealand) Sara Mason	Subaru Impreza WRX
2015	(New Zealand) Ben Hunt	Subaru Impreza WRX	(New Zealand) Tony Rawstorn	Subaru Impreza WRX
2016	(New Zealand) David Holder	Mitsubishi Lancer Evo IX	(New Zealand) Jason Farmer	Mitsubishi Lancer Evo IX
2017	(New Zealand) Andrew Hawkeswood	Mazda 2 AP4+	(New Zealand) Jeff Cress	Mazda 2 AP4+
2018	(New Zealand) Hayden Paddon	Hyundai i20 AP4+	(New Zealand) Tony Rawstorn	Subaru Impreza WRX STI
2019	(New Zealand) Ben Hunt	Subaru Impreza WRX STI	(New Zealand) Tony Rawstorn	Subaru Impreza WRX STI
2020	No 2020 Championship			
2021	(New Zealand) Hayden Paddon	Hyundai i20 AP4+	(New Zealand) John Kennard	Hyundai i20 AP4+
2022	(New Zealand) Hayden Paddon	Hyundai i20 AP4+	(New Zealand) John Kennard	Hyundai i20 AP4+
2023	(New Zealand) Hayden Paddon	Hyundai i20 N Rally2	(New Zealand) John Kennard	Hyundai i20 N Rally2
2024	(New Zealand) Ben Hunt	Škoda Fabia Rally2 evo	(New Zealand) Tony Rawstorn	Škoda Fabia Rally2 evo
2025	(New Zealand) Ben Hunt	Škoda Fabia Rally2 evo	(New Zealand) Tony Rawstorn	Škoda Fabia Rally2 evo
2026	(New Zealand) Jack Hawkeswood	Toyota GR Yaris Rally2	(New Zealand) Jason Farmer	Toyota GR Yaris Rally2

=== Rally Championship Category Champions ===
Year	Class	Driver	Vehicle	Co-Driver	Vehicle
2007	FIA 2WD	(New Zealand) Mark Tapper	Ford Fiesta ST	(New Zealand) Jeff Cress	Ford Fiesta ST
2008	FIA 2WD	(New Zealand) Patrick Malley	Ford Fiesta ST	(New Zealand) Raymond Bennett	Ford Fiesta ST
2009	FIA 2WD	(New Zealand) Ben Jagger	Ford Fiesta ST	(New Zealand) Ben Hawkins	Ford Fiesta ST
2010	FIA 2WD	(New Zealand) Stephen Barker	Ford Fiesta ST	(New Zealand) Richard Ellis	Ford Fiesta ST
2011	FIA 2WD	(New Zealand) Ben Hunt	Ford Fiesta ST	(New Zealand) Tony Rawstorn	Ford Fiesta ST
2012	FIA 2WD	(New Zealand) Ben Hunt	Ford Fiesta ST	(New Zealand) Tony Rawstorn	Ford Fiesta ST
2012	Open 2WD	(New Zealand) David Holder	Toyota Levin	(New Zealand) James Holder	Toyota Levin
2013	Overall 2WD	(New Zealand) Josh Marston	Ford Fiesta R2	(New Zealand) Venita Fabbro	Ford Fiesta R2
2013	FIA 2WD	(New Zealand) Josh Marston	Ford Fiesta R2	(New Zealand) Venita Fabbro	Ford Fiesta R2
2013	Open 2WD	(New Zealand) Hamish Anderson	Toyota Levin	(New Zealand) Sarah Brennan	Toyota Levin
2014	Overall 2WD	(New Zealand) Max Bayley	Ford Fiesta R2	(New Zealand) Phillip Deakin	Ford Fiesta R2
2014	FIA 2WD	(New Zealand) Max Bayley	Ford Fiesta R2	(New Zealand) Phillip Deakin	Ford Fiesta R2
2014	Open 2WD	(New Zealand) Hamish Anderson	Toyota Levin	(New Zealand) Sarah Brennan	Toyota Levin
2015	Overall 2WD	(New Zealand) Max Bayley	Ford Fiesta R2	(New Zealand) Donna Elder	Ford Fiesta R2
2015	FIA 2WD	(New Zealand) Max Bayley	Ford Fiesta R2	(New Zealand) Donna Elder	Ford Fiesta R2
2015	Open 2WD	Not Awarded			
2016	Overall 2WD	(New Zealand) Dave Strong	Honda Civic	(New Zealand) Bruce McKenzie	Honda Civic
2016	FIA 2WD	(New Zealand) Max Bayley	Ford Fiesta R2	(New Zealand) Lisa Hudson	Ford Fiesta R2
2016	Open 2WD	(New Zealand) Dave Strong	Honda Civic	(New Zealand) Bruce McKenzie	Honda Civic
2017	Overall 2WD	(New Zealand) Dylan Thomson	Ford Fiesta ST	(New Zealand) Amy Hudson	Ford Fiesta ST
2017	FIA 2WD	(New Zealand) Dylan Thomson	Ford Fiesta ST	(New Zealand) Amy Hudson	Ford Fiesta ST
2017	Open 2WD	(Wales) Anthony Jones	Ford Escort	(New Zealand) Tanya Gwynne	Ford Escort
2018	Overall 2WD	(New Zealand) Dylan Thomson	Ford Fiesta ST	(New Zealand) Amy Hudson	Ford Fiesta ST
2018	FIA 2WD	(New Zealand) Dylan Thomson	Ford Fiesta ST	(New Zealand) Amy Hudson	Ford Fiesta ST
2018	Open 2WD	(New Zealand) Marcus van Klink	Mazda RX-8	(New Zealand) Dave Neil	Mazda RX-8
2019	Overall 2WD	(New Zealand) Marcus van Klink	Mazda RX-8	(New Zealand) Dave Neil	Mazda RX-8
2019	FIA 2WD	(New Zealand) Mike Sheehan	Ford Fiesta R2	(New Zealand) Glenn Goldring	Ford Fiesta R2
2019	Open 2WD	(New Zealand) Marcus van Klink	Mazda RX-8	(New Zealand) Dave Neil	Mazda RX-8
2020	No 2020 Championship				
2021	Overall 2WD	(New Zealand) Dylan Thomson	Ford Fiesta ST	(New Zealand) Amy Hudson	Ford Fiesta ST
2021	FIA 2WD	(New Zealand) Dylan Thomson	Ford Fiesta ST	(New Zealand) Amy Hudson	Ford Fiesta ST
2021	Open 2WD	(New Zealand) Ari Pettigrew	BMW 318ti	(New Zealand) Samantha Gray	BMW 318ti
2022	Overall 2WD	(New Zealand) Dylan Thomson	Ford Fiesta ST	(New Zealand) Brayden Thomson	Ford Fiesta Rally4
2022	FIA 2WD	(New Zealand) Dylan Thomson	Ford Fiesta ST	(New Zealand) Brayden Thomson	Ford Fiesta Rally4
2022	Open 2WD	(New Zealand) Daniel Haines	Ford Escort	(New Zealand) Matt Priest	Ford Escort Mk2
2023	Overall 2WD	(New Zealand) Dylan Thomson	Ford Fiesta Rally4	(New Zealand) Brayden Thomson	Ford Fiesta Rally4
2023	FIA 2WD	(New Zealand) Dylan Thomson	Ford Fiesta Rally4	(New Zealand) Brayden Thomson	Ford Fiesta Rally4
2023	Open 2WD	(New Zealand) Daniel Haines	Ford Escort	(New Zealand) Matt Priest	Ford Escort Mk2
2024	Overall 2WD	(New Zealand) Dylan Thomson	Ford Fiesta Rally4	(New Zealand) Brayden Thomson	Ford Fiesta Rally4
2024	FIA 2WD	(New Zealand) Dylan Thomson	Ford Fiesta Rally4	(New Zealand) Brayden Thomson	Ford Fiesta Rally4
2024	Open 2WD	(New Zealand) William Hawes	Toyota 86	(New Zealand) Jason Dwyer	Toyota 86
2025	Overall 2WD	(New Zealand) Bryn Jones	Ford Fiesta Rally4	(New Zealand) Sean Lockyear	Ford Fiesta Rally4
2025	FIA 2WD	(New Zealand) Bryn Jones	Ford Fiesta Rally4	(New Zealand) Sean Lockyear	Ford Fiesta Rally4
2025	Open 2WD	(New Zealand) Dave Strong	Honda Jazz	(New Zealand) Rob Scott	Honda Jazz
2026	Overall 2WD	(New Zealand) Ben Harding	Mazda RX-7	(New Zealand) Charlotte Harding	Mazda RX-7
2026	FIA 2WD	(Japan) Fuyuhiko Takahashi	Ford Fiesta Rally4	(Japan) Ken Takahashi	Ford Fiesta Rally4
2026	Open 2WD	(New Zealand) Tim Mackersy	Ford Fiesta Rally4	(New Zealand) Lauren Mackersy	Ford Fiesta Rally4
2026	Classics	(New Zealand) Ben Harding	Mazda RX-7	(New Zealand) Charlotte Harding	Mazda RX-7

=== Rally Challenge Category Champions ===
Year	Class	Driver	Vehicle	Co-Driver
2006	Historics	(New Zealand) Robert Murray	Mazda RX-7	(New Zealand) Deborah Kibble
2007	Historics	(New Zealand) Eaun Fuge	Mazda RX-3	(New Zealand) Mike Gibbs
2008	Historics	(New Zealand) Robert Wylie	Nissan 240RS	(New Zealand) Paul Turner
2009	Historics	(New Zealand) Mike Cameron	Mitsubishi Lancer	(New Zealand) Helen Cameron
2010	Historics	(New Zealand) Regan Ross	Ford Escort	(New Zealand) Darren Galbraith
2011	Historics	(New Zealand) Robert Wylie	Nissan 240RS	(New Zealand) Tim Smith
2012	Historics	(New Zealand) Marcus van Klink	Mazda RX-7	(New Zealand) Dave Neil
2013	4WD	(New Zealand) Graham Featherstone	Mitsubishi Lancer Evo VII	(New Zealand) Chris Davison
2013	2WD	(New Zealand) David Ralph	Toyota Starlet	(New Zealand) Paul MacDonald
2013	Historics	(New Zealand) Dean Buist	Ford Escort RS1800	(New Zealand) Andrew Bullman
2014	4WD	(New Zealand) Darren Galbraith	Mitsubishi Lancer Evo VI	(New Zealand) James Bracefield
2014	2WD	(New Zealand) Jeff Torkington	Toyota MR2	(New Zealand) Hilary Gandy
2014	Historics	(New Zealand) Marcus van Klink	Mazda RX-7	(New Zealand) Dave Neil
2015	Overall	(New Zealand) Darren Galbraith	Mitsubishi Lancer Evo VI	(New Zealand) Rocky Hudson
2015	4WD	(New Zealand) Richard Bateman	Mitsubishi Lancer Evo VIII	(New Zealand) Sharisse Guckert
2015	2WD	(New Zealand) Justin Glavish	Toyota Starlet	(New Zealand) Michele Brunt
2015	Historics	(New Zealand) Marcus van Klink	Mazda RX-7	(New Zealand) Dave Neil
2016	Overall	(New Zealand) Kingsley Jones	Mitsubishi Lancer Evo VII	(New Zealand) Waverley Jones
2016	4WD	(New Zealand) Kingsley Jones	Mitsubishi Lancer Evo VII	(New Zealand) Waverley Jones
2016	2WD	(New Zealand) Jeff Torkington	Toyota MR2	(New Zealand) Rodney James
2016	Historics	(New Zealand) Marcus van Klink	Mazda RX-7	(New Zealand) Dave Neil
2017	Overall	(New Zealand) Adam Bligh	Mitsubishi Lancer Evo VIII	(New Zealand) Ric Chalmers
2017	4WD	(New Zealand) Richard Bateman	Mitsubishi Lancer Evo IX	(New Zealand) Ric Chalmers
2017	2WD	(New Zealand) David Taylor	Honda Civic	(New Zealand) Pania Huntley
2017	Historics	(United Kingdom) Tony Gosling	Ford Escort	(New Zealand) Blair Reid
2018	Overall	(New Zealand) Grant Blackberry	Mitsubishi Lancer Evo X	(New Zealand) Ric Chalmers
2018	4WD	(New Zealand) Grant Blackberry	Mitsubishi Lancer Evo X	(New Zealand) Ric Chalmers
2018	2WD	(New Zealand) Marcus van Klink	Mazda RX-8	(New Zealand) Dave Neill
2018	Historics	(New Zealand) John Silcock	Mazda RX-7	(New Zealand) Samantha Gray
2018	Classic 4WD	(New Zealand) Matt Adams	Mitsubishi Galant VR-4	(New Zealand) Karl Adams
2019	Overall	(New Zealand) Matt Adams	Mitsubishi Lancer Evo IX	(New Zealand) Lisa Hudson
2019	4WD	(New Zealand) Matt Adams	Mitsubishi Lancer Evo IX	(New Zealand) Lisa Hudson
2019	2WD	(New Zealand) Daniel Alexander	Toyota Starlet	(New Zealand) Katrina Renshaw
2019	Historics	(New Zealand) Jeff Judd	Ford Escort	(New Zealand) Sarah Brennan
2019	Classic 4WD	(New Zealand) Phil Collins	Audi Quattro Coupe	(New Zealand) Tracy Spark
2020	No 2020 Championship			
2021	Overall	(New Zealand) Quentin Palmer	Mitsubishi Lancer Evo VI	(New Zealand) Noel Moloney
2021	4WD	(New Zealand) Quentin Palmer	Mitsubishi Lancer Evo VI	(New Zealand) Noel Moloney
2021	2WD	(New Zealand) Daniel Haines	Ford Escort Mk2	(New Zealand) Matt Priest
2021	Historics	(Wales) Anthony Jones	Ford Escort	(New Zealand) Zoe Jones
2021	Classic 4WD	(Scotland) Sean Haggarty	Subaru Impreza WRX	(New Zealand) Bella Haggarty
2022	Overall	(New Zealand) Jeff Ward	Subaru Impreza WRX	(New Zealand) Murray O'Neil
2022	4WD	(New Zealand) Jeff Ward	Subaru Impreza WRX	(New Zealand) Murray O'Neil
2022	2WD	(New Zealand) Jonty Brenssell	Toyota Starlet	(New Zealand) Daph O'Rourke
2022	Historics	(New Zealand) John Silcock	Mazda RX-7	(New Zealand) Donna Elder
2022	Classic 4WD	(New Zealand) Chris Lockyear	Mitsubishi Lancer Evo III	(New Zealand) Sean Lockyear
2023	Overall	(Japan) Zeal Jones	Subaru Impreza WRX	(New Zealand) Matthew Sayers
2023	4WD	(Japan) Zeal Jones	Subaru Impreza WRX	(New Zealand) Matthew Sayers
2023	2WD	(New Zealand) Jared Parker	Toyota FX Corolla	(New Zealand) Kyle Shears
2023	Historics	(New Zealand) John Silcock	Mazda RX-7	(New Zealand) Donna Elder
2023	Classic 4WD	(New Zealand) Amy Keighley	Subaru Impreza H6	(New Zealand) Nikita Gibson
2024	Overall	(New Zealand) Andrew Graves	Mitsubishi Lancer Evo 3	(New Zealand) Hayden Graves
2024	4WD	(New Zealand) Andrew Graves	Mitsubishi Lancer Evo 3	(New Zealand) Hayden Graves
2024	2WD	(New Zealand) Jared Parker	Toyota FX Corolla	(New Zealand) Kyle Shears
2024	Historics	(New Zealand) Paul Fraser	Ford Escort	(New Zealand) Helen Cameron
2024	Classic 4WD	(New Zealand) Andrew Graves	Mitsubishi Lancer Evo 3	(New Zealand) Hayden Graves
2025	Overall	(New Zealand) Caleb MacDonald	Mitsubishi Lancer Evo 6	(New Zealand) Larisa Biggar
2025	4WD	(New Zealand) Caleb MacDonald	Mitsubishi Lancer Evo 6	(New Zealand) Larisa Biggar
2025	2WD	(New Zealand) Ian Warren	Nissan Pulsar	(New Zealand) Bridget Airey
2025	Historics	(New Zealand) Deane Buist	Ford Escort	(Philippines) Karl Celeste
2025	Classic 4WD	(New Zealand) Josh Keighley	Subaru Impreza H6	(New Zealand) Neill Woolley
2026	Overall	(New Zealand) Grant Blackberry	Mitsubishi Lancer Evo 10	(New Zealand) Ric Chalmers
2026	4WD	(New Zealand) Grant Blackberry	Mitsubishi Lancer Evo 10	(New Zealand) Ric Chalmers
2026	2WD	(New Zealand) Josh Silcock	Ford Fiesta R2	(New Zealand) Matthew Sayers
2026	Historics	(New Zealand) Phil Macquarie	Ford Escort	(New Zealand) Andrew Brooks
2026	Classic 4WD	(New Zealand) Thomas Paul	Subaru Impreza H6	(New Zealand) Bridget Airey

=== Junior Drivers Champions ===
Year	Driver	Vehicle
1983	(New Zealand) Mike Montgomery	
1984	(New Zealand) Mike Montgomery	
1985	(New Zealand) Robert Hart	
1986	(New Zealand) Brett Hill	
1987	(New Zealand) Stuart Weeber	
1988	(New Zealand) Stuart Weeber	
1989	(New Zealand) Darren Fairhall	
1990	(New Zealand) Greg Graham	
1991	(New Zealand) Mark Leonard	
1992	(New Zealand) Roger McKay	
1993	(New Zealand) Blair Logan	
1994	(New Zealand) Andrew Grant	
1995	(New Zealand) Greg Graham	
1996	(New Zealand) Craig Marshall	
1997	(New Zealand) Jason West	
1998	(New Zealand) Chris West	
1999	(New Zealand) Karl Robinson	
2000	(New Zealand) Chris West	
2001	(New Zealand) Cameron Bates	
2002	(New Zealand) Richard Mason	
2003	(New Zealand) Richard Mason	
2004	(New Zealand) Dean Sumner	
2005	(New Zealand) Brett Martin	
2006	(New Zealand) Hayden Paddon	
2007	(New Zealand) Hayden Paddon	
2008	(New Zealand) Hayden Paddon	
2009	(New Zealand) Matt Jansen	
2010	(New Zealand) Sloan Cox	
2011	(New Zealand) Ben Hunt	
2012	(New Zealand) Matt Jansen	
2013	(New Zealand) Ben Hunt	
2014	(New Zealand) David Holder	
2015	(New Zealand) Lance Williams	
2016	(New Zealand) Sloan Cox	Mitsubishi Lancer Evo X
2017	(New Zealand) Dylan Thomson	Ford Fiesta MK5 ST
2018	(New Zealand) Dylan Thomson	Ford Fiesta MK5 ST
2019	(New Zealand) Dylan Thomson	Subaru Impreza WRX STi
2020	Not Contested	
2021	(New Zealand) Ari Pettigrew	BMW 318 Ti Compact E36
2022	(New Zealand) Ari Pettigrew	Holden Barina AP4
2023	(New Zealand) Bryn Jones	Ford Fiesta R2
2024	(Japan) Zeal Jones	Skoda Fabia R5
2025	(New Zealand) Jack Stokes	Ford Fiesta AP4
2026	(New Zealand) Jack Stokes	Skoda Fabia Rally2 Evo

=== Rookie Drivers Champions ===
Year	Driver	Vehicle
2003	Dean Summer	Mitsubishi Lancer Evo 6
2004	Sam Murray	Subaru Impreza
2005	Lee-Anne Barns	Mitsubishi Lancer Evo 8
2006	Hayden Paddon	Mitsubishi Lancer Evo 8
2007	Callum McInnes	Subaru Impreza WRX
2008	Andre Meier	Subaru Impreza
2009	Matt Jansen	Subaru Impreza
2010	Regan Ross	Ford Escort
2011	Neil Marshall	Mitsubishi Lancer Evo 8
2012	David Holder	Toyota Levin
2013	Graham Featherstone	Mitsubishi Lancer Evo 7
2014	Lance Williams	Subaru Impreza WRX
2015	Richard Bateman	Mitsubishi Lancer Evo 8
2016	Carl Davies	Toyota Yaris
2017	Max Tregilgas	Ford Fiesta ST
2018	Eugene Creugnet	Mitsubishi Lancer Evo 9
2019	Ben Thomasen	Subaru Impreza
2020	No 2020 Championship	
2021	Brendon Wadsworth	Ford Fiesta R2
2022	John-Paul van Der Meys	Ford Fiesta ST
2023	Jared Parker	Toyota Corolla
2024	Carter Strang	Mitsubishi Lancer Evo 10
2025	Josh Keighley	Subaru Impreza H6
2026	Ben Harding	Mazda RX-7

=== Gold Card Drivers Champions ===
Year	Driver	Vehicle
2024	Paul Fraser	Ford Escort
2025	Mike Cameron	Mitsubishi Lancer
2026	Dave Strong	Honda Jazz RS

=== Manufacturer Champions ===
Year	Manufacturer
1994	(Japan) Subaru
1995	(Japan) Mitsubishi
1996	(Japan) Subaru
1997	(Japan) Mitsubishi
1998	(Japan) Mitsubishi
1999	(Japan) Mitsubishi
2000	(Japan) Mitsubishi
2001	(Japan) Mitsubishi
2002	(Japan) Mitsubishi
2003	(Japan) Mitsubishi
2004	(Japan) Mitsubishi
2005	(Japan) Subaru
2006	(Japan) Subaru
2007	(Japan) Subaru
2008	(Japan) Mitsubishi
2009	(Japan) Subaru
2010	(Japan) Mitsubishi
2011	(Japan) Subaru
2012	(Japan) Subaru
2013	Not Contested
2014	(Japan) Subaru
2015	(Japan) Subaru
2016	(Japan) Mitsubishi
2017	(Japan) Subaru
2018	(South Korea) Hyundai
2019	(Japan) Subaru
2020	No Championship
2021	(South Korea) Hyundai
2022	(South Korea) Hyundai
2023	(United States) Ford
2024	(United States) Ford
2025	(Czech Republic) Skoda
2026	(Japan) Toyota

=== Teams Cup ===
Year	Team	Driver / Co-Driver	Vehicle
2013	Andrew Simms Mitsubishi	(New Zealand) Chris West (New Zealand) Chris Cobham	Mitsubishi Lancer Evo X
2013	Andrew Simms Mitsubishi	(New Zealand) Josh Marston (New Zealand) Rocky Hudson	Ford Fiesta R2
2013	Andrew Simms Mitsubishi	(New Zealand) Jeff Judd (New Zealand) Malcolm Read	Ford Escort RS1800
2014	Team Mason	(New Zealand) Richard Mason (New Zealand) Sara Mason	Subaru Impreza WRX STI
2014	Team Mason	(New Zealand) Marcus van Klink (New Zealand) Dave Neil	Mazda RX-7
2014	Team Mason	(New Zealand) Brent Taylor (New Zealand) Chris Ramsay	Toyota 86
2015 - 2016	Non Contested		
2017		(New Zealand) Matt Summerfield (New Zealand) Nicole Summerfield	Subaru Impreza WRX STI
2017		(New Zealand) Darren Galbraith (New Zealand) Rocky Hudson	Mitsubishi Lancer Evo VIII
2017		(New Zealand) Jack Williamson (New Zealand) Brenda Williamson	Suzuki Swift
2018	Tortoise and the Hare	(New Zealand) Jack Williamson (New Zealand) Brenda Williamson	Subaru Impreza WRX STI R4
2018	Tortoise and the Hare	(New Zealand) Hayden Paddon (New Zealand) John Kennard	Hyundai i20 AP4+
2019	Team LJ Hooker	(New Zealand) Dylan Turner (New Zealand) Malcolm Read	Audi S1 AP4+
2019	Team LJ Hooker	(New Zealand) Dylan Thomson (New Zealand) Amy Hudson	Subaru Impreza WRX STI
2020	No Championship		
2021	Paddon Rallysport	(New Zealand) Hayden Paddon (New Zealand) John Kennard	Hyundai i20 AP4+
2021	Paddon Rallysport	(New Zealand) Ari Pettigrew (New Zealand) Samantha Gray	BMW 318ti
2022	Paddon Rallysport	(New Zealand) Hayden Paddon (New Zealand) John Kennard	Hyundai i20 AP4+
2022	Paddon Rallysport	(New Zealand) Ari Pettigrew (New Zealand) Jason Farmer	Holden Barina AP4
2023	Paddon Rallysport	(New Zealand) Hayden Paddon (New Zealand) John Kennard	Hyundai i20 N Rally2
2023	Paddon Rallysport	(New Zealand) Ari Pettigrew (New Zealand) Jason Farmer	Holden Barina AP4
2024	Rally4Play	(New Zealand) Dylan Thomson (New Zealand) Bayden Thomson	Ford Fiesta Rally4
2024	Rally4Play	(New Zealand) Bryn Jones (New Zealand) Sean Lockyear	Ford Fiesta Rally4
2025	M-Sport Rally4	(New Zealand) Bryn Jones (New Zealand) Sean Lockyear	Ford Fiesta Rally4
2025	M-Sport Rally4	(New Zealand) Tim Mackersy (New Zealand) Lauren Mackersy	Ford Fiesta Rally4
2026	Team Sth Auckland Car Club	(New Zealand) Jack Hakweswood (New Zealand) Jason Farmer	Toyota GR Yaris Rally2
2026	Team Sth Auckland Car Club	(New Zealand) Dave Strong (New Zealand) Robb Scott	Honda Jazz RS

== Multiple Winners ==
=== Gold Star Rally Championship Drivers ===
Wins	Driver	Year
7	Hayden Paddon	2008–2009, 2013, 2018, 2021–2023
5	Richard Mason	2005–2006, 2011–2012, 2014
4	Bruce Herbert	2000–2003
4	Ben Hunt	2015, 2019, 2024, 2025
3	Rod Millen	1975–1977
3	Tony Teesdale	1982, 1984, 1987
3	Neil Allport	1986, 1989, 1992
3	Joe McAndrew	1993–1994, 1996
2	Jim Donald	1980–1981
2	Brian Stokes	1985, 1988
2	Reece Jones	1995, 1997
2	Geoff Argyle	1998–1999

=== Gold Star Rally Championship Co-Drivers ===
Wins	Co-Driver	Year
6	Robert Haldane	1988–1990, 1993–1994, 1996
6	Rob Ryan	1999–2003, 2007
6	John Kennard	2008–2009, 2013, 2021–2023
5	Tony Rawstorn	2015, 2018–2019, 2024, 2025
4	Sara Mason	2006, 2011–2012, 2014
2	Garry Cowan	2004–2005
2	Leo Bult	1995, 1997
2	Jason Farmer	2016, 2026

== Rallies By Year ==
=== 1979 ===
Rnd	1979
1	Upper Hutt
2	Marlborough
3	Northland
4	Rotorua

=== 1980–1989 ===
Rnd	1980	1981	1982	1983	1984	1985	1986	1987	1988	1989
1	South Canterbury	Canterbury	Tokoroa	Otago	South Island	South Island	North Otago	Upper Hutt	Upper Hutt	
2	Wairarapa	Invercargill	Rotorua	Whanganui	Tokoroa	Auckland	Auckland	Canterbury	Otago	
3	Hamilton	Rotorua	Nelson	Marlborough	Canterbury	Canterbury	Canterbury	Southland	Canterbury	
4	Northland	Northland	Northland	Canterbury	Hawkes Bay	Southland	Hawkes Bay	Auckland	Southland	
5				Southland	North Otago	Hawkes Bay	Nelson	Marlborough	Taupo	
6				Hamilton	Hamilton	Taupo	Tokoroa	Northland	Tokoroa	
7				Hawkes Bay	Northland	North Otago	Northland			
8				Northland	South Canterbury	Northland				

=== 1990–1999 ===
Rnd	1990	1991	1992	1993	1994	1995	1996	1997	1998	1999
1	Canterbury	Canterbury	Canterbury	Auckland	Otago	Ohakune	Ohakune	Marlborough	Gisborne	Marlborough
2	Southland	Southland	Southland	Manawatu	Auckland	Canterbury	Canterbury	Gisborne	Marlborough	Taumarunui
3	New Zealand (WRC/APRC)	New Zealand (WRC/APRC)	New Zealand (WRC/APRC)	Southland	Canterbury	Otago	Otago	Otago	Otago	Otago
4	Manawatu	Manawatu	Northland	Canterbury	Southland	Southland	Southland	Southland	Southland	Southland
5	Tokoroa	Northland	Manawatu	New Zealand (WRC/APRC)	New Zealand (WRC/APRC)	New Zealand (WRC/APRC)	New Zealand (2LWC/APRC)	New Zealand (WRC/APRC)	New Zealand (WRC/APRC)	New Zealand (WRC/APRC)
6					Waikato	Auckland	Waikato	Hawkes Bay	Hawkes Bay	Gisborne
7					Manawatu	Waikato	Hawkes Bay	Waikato	Rotorua	Rotorua

=== 2000–2009 ===
Rnd	2000	2001	2002	2003	2004	2005	2006	2007	2008	2009
1	Otago	Otago	Otago	New Zealand (WRC)	Otago	New Zealand (WRC)	Otago	Otago	Wairarapa	Hawkes Bay
2	Canterbury		Southland	Otago	Southland	Otago	Rotorua (APRC)	Whangarei (APRC)	Otago	Otago
3	Southland	Rotorua (APRC)	Rotorua (APRC)	Southland	Rotorua (APRC)	Wairarapa	Whangarei	Wairarapa	Whangarei (APRC)	Whangarei (APRC)
4	Manawatu	New Zealand (WRC)	Hawkes Bay	Rotorua (APRC)	Hawkes Bay	Rotorua (APRC)	Hawkes Bay	Hawkes Bay	Hawkes Bay	Wairarapa
5	Rotorua	Manawatu	New Zealand (WRC)	Hawkes Bay	Nelson	Hawkes Bay	Wairarapa	New Zealand (WRC)	New Zealand (WRC)	Nelson
6					Waikato	Nelson	Nelson	Nelson	Nelson	Nelson

=== 2010–2019 ===
Rnd	2010	2011	2012	2013	2014	2015	2016	2017	2018	2019
1	Otago	Otago	Whangarei (APRC)	Otago	Whangarei (APRC)	Whangarei (APRC)	Otago	Otago	Otago	Otago
2	New Zealand (WRC)	New Zealand	Wairarapa	Whangarei (APRC)	Otago	Otago	Whangarei (APRC)	Whangarei (APRC)	Whangarei (APRC)	Whangarei
3	Whangarei (APRC)	Wairarapa	Otago	Manawatu	Canterbury	Canterbury	Canterbury	Canterbury	Canterbury	Canterbury
4	Nelson	Whangarei (APRC)	New Zealand (WRC)	Canterbury	Wairarapa	Gisborne	Gisborne	Coromandel	South Canterbury	South Canterbury
5	Wairarapa	Hawkes Bay	Gisborne	Possum Bourne Memorial	Coromandel	Coromandel	Coromandel	Waitomo	Coromandel	Coromandel
6				Wairarapa	Manawatu	Wairarapa		New Zealand	Raglan	Waitomo

=== 2020–2029 ===
Rnd	2020	2021	2022	2023	2024	2025	2026	2027
1	Cancelled	Otago	Otago	Otago	Otago	Otago	Otago	Otago
2	Cancelled	Whangarei	Whangarei	Whangarei	South Canterbury	South Canterbury	Canterbury	Canterbury
3	Cancelled	South Canterbury	South Canterbury	South Canterbury	Southland	Canterbury	Southland	Southland
4	Cancelled	Hawkes Bay	Hawkes Bay	Cancelled	Manawatu	Coromandel	Hawkes Bay	Hawkes Bay
5	Cancelled	Cancelled	New Zealand Day 1 (WRC)	Cancelled	Bay Of Plenty	Bay Of Plenty	Whangarei	Bay Of Plenty
6			New Zealand Day 2 (WRC)	Manawatu	Whangarei (APRC)	Whangarei	Bay Of Plenty	Whangarei
7				Bay Of Plenty				
