= SCI =

SCI may refer to:

== Companies ==
- Service Corporation International, an American funeral service provider
- Shipping Corporation of India
- SCI Systems, merged into Sanmina Corporation, electronics manufacturing
- SCi Games, a video game publisher

== Organizations and sporting ==
- Safari Club International
- Schistosomiasis Control Initiative
- Scientific Computing and Imaging Institute
- Seamen's Church Institute of New York and New Jersey
- Service Civil International, peace movement
- Silverthorn Collegiate Institute, school in Toronto, Ontario, Canada
- Sister Cities International
- Society of Chemical Industry
- Solar Cookers International
- Sport Club Internacional, a football club in Brazil
- Strategic Computing Initiative, US program to fund AI research
- Systemics, Cybernetics and Informatics, conference later named WMSCI
- Southern Careers Institute

== Science ==
- Metcalf Center for Science and Engineering, Boston University, USA
- Science Citation Index
- Spinal cord injury
- Space Competitiveness Index
- SCI (calculator mode), display in scientific notation
- Science of Creative Intelligence
- Science Channel, a US cable television channel
- Sci (journal)
- System call interface

== Other ==
- Scalable Coherent Interface, former interconnect standard
- Sensitive Compartmented Information, US security classification
- Serial communication interface, early term for a UART
- Sierra Creative Interpreter, the game engine used by Sierra Entertainment for many of their games
- Site of Community Importance, EU
- SCi, a model of Ford Duratec engine
- Special Criminal Investigation, a video game
- The String Cheese Incident, a jam band
- Paramillo Airport (IATA code of SCI)
- State Correctional Institution, Pennsylvania Department of Corrections prisons
- Summer Camp Island, a Cartoon Network television series
- Supreme Court of India, the highest court in the Republic of India
- sci.* hierarchy of Usenet newsgroups

== See also ==
- SCIS (disambiguation)
