= Australian National Bibliographic Database =

Library cataloguing network in Australia

- Website type: Online database
- Owner: National Library of Australia
- Website: www.nla.gov.au/librariesaustralia/about-australian-national-bibliographic-database-anbd
- Commercial: No
- Launched: 1981; 45 years ago
- Accessible via Libraries Australia; set to become part of Trove Collaborative Services.

The Australian National Bibliographic Database (ANBD), formerly part of the Australian Bibliographic Network (ABN) and for some years renamed Kinetica, is a national shared library cataloguing network, hosted by the National Library of Australia. It commenced in 1981 in Australia as the ABN, and after a series of rebrandings and added services, has since 2006 been available through Libraries Australia (the successor to the ABN). In mid-2019, Libraries Australia partnered with Trove, and as of June 2020 is set to be co-branded with Trove.

ANBD is Australia's largest single bibliographic resource, containing bibliographic records of published and unpublished sources that form part of an Australian collection, as well as catalogue records of items from the US Library of Congress and other institutions. It includes holdings data, name and subject authority records. It supplies records to Libraries Australia in various supported formats, in order to provide enriched data and support copy cataloguing, thus streamlining services for all libraries in Australia. It is a subscription-based service, via Libraries Australia, for librarians, used for reference, collection development, cataloguing and inter-library loans. It thus also serves as a kind of enhanced union catalogue.

== History ==
The National Library of Australia (NLA) began investigating the potential for a national shared cataloguing network in the 1970s. The idea behind the network was that, instead of every library in Australia separately cataloguing every item in their collection, an item would be catalogued just once and stored on a single database. Librarians in other libraries could then copy the record, thus bringing about huge savings in efficiency and money. In August 1978, following a feasibility study, the NLA announced a pilot project.

The Australian Bibliographic Network (ABN) commenced operations on 2 November 1981, with six participating libraries, which all contributed cataloguing records. During those pre-Internet days, library catalogues were on cards or microfiche, so the use of the digital database was seen as revolutionary.

The database was known as the Australian National Bibliographic Database (ANBD), while the library network was the Australian Bibliographic Network. The ABN may be seen as the forerunner to Libraries Australia. The National Library established an advisory body, the ABN Network Committee (now Libraries Australia Advisory Committee, or LAAC) to advise the Library on the operation and development of the service.

Various state library systems joined the network within the next few years, such as State Library Victoria in 1982, and the first ABN conference was held in Melbourne in 1983. The ABN system was as a multi-sector network, including university, state, public and special libraries. Services to school libraries were provided under a separate national service, the Schools Catalogue Information Service (SCIS), first developed in 1984 as ASCIS.

=== National standards ===
Training for the network, and the subject catalogue of the network underwent a range of changes in the 1980s. The ABN Standards Committee met for the first time on 14 May 1981. The issues dealt with in the first four meetings included:

- minimum level of detail in contributed records
- allowable and mandatory changes to bibliographic and authority records
- priorities for authority control
- detailed examination of AACR2 rule interpretations
- standards for geographic names
- extension of LCSH to allow additional 'approved' subject headings
- use of MESH and "Participant" subject headings
- the subject heading for Australian Aborigines
- policy on duplicate records
- the hierarchy for "bumping" (record replacement) among different sources
- standards for a "high level record" that would be immune from bumping
- extension of the Input/Edit system to cater for music, maps and manuscripts

Once standards were established, a range of guidelines and publications ensued

=== Inter-library loans ===
In 1990, the ABN created an inter-library lending service.

=== Rebranding ===
In 1999, the National Library moved to a new system, called Kinetica, which conformed to the standard international z39.50 protocol, enabling it to interact with other automated library systems. The software allowed users to interact with a graphical interface for the first time, rather than a text-based one, and by this time there were over 1000 member libraries and almost 30 million items were available on the ANDB.

After a two-year project to redevelop Kinetica, the software used for searching and cataloguing was replaced, and a new administration system was created in November 2005. The new service was branded Libraries Australia, consisting of four components: Search, Cataloguing, Administration and Document Delivery. The more user-friendly search facility for ANBD then provided access to over 42 million items held by around 800 libraries around Australia, as well as about 1.2 million images held by PictureAustralia and many international library catalogues. In addition, the Chinese, Korean and Japanese Database (CJK) merged with Libraries Australia, and in the following year, a free search became publicly available.

=== International cooperation ===
In 2006, the National Library entered into an agreement with the National Library of New Zealand, allowing inter-library loans between the two countries.

In 2007, Libraries Australia signed an agreement with international library cooperative OCLC, which meant that data added to the ANDB was included in WorldCat, the largest online public access catalogue (OPAC) in the world.

== Trove, and recent changes ==
In 2008–9, Libraries Australia's free and subscription services were separated, and the free public search was replaced by Trove. In 2013, it adopted a new cataloguing standard, RDA Resource Description and Access. In 2014, it redeveloped the search facility, and the following year, ANBD reached a million RDA records.

== Current services and organisation ==
The ANBD is the largest single bibliographic source in Australia. It contains millions of entries for books, journals and items in formats other than text, such as films, sound recordings, photographs, braille and audiobooks, music scores, computer files and digital material. It includes catalogue records from Australian and other libraries; Australian records are accompanied by location of the item. As of 2020, its entries cover 50 million holdings, including those in over 1,200 Australian libraries. Contributing libraries include

Apart from the ANBD, Libraries Australia's subscription service also provides access to a number of databases from other major institutions, such as the British Library Catalogue, Chinese University of Hong Kong, Research Libraries UK, Informit database, Library of Congress Catalogue, National Film and Sound Archive, WorldCat, the Powerhouse Museum, Te Puna (the New Zealand National Bibliographic Database), National Museum of Australia and the University of Hong Kong. It also includes the Libraries Australia name and subject authorities added to the ANBD by the National Library and other contributing libraries.

From July 2019, Libraries Australia became a partner within Trove Collaborative Services, continuing all services as before and with a rollout of new services. From June 2020, co-branding with Trove will become effective.

== See also ==
- National Library of Australia
- Trove
