= Ford Fiesta (fifth generation) =

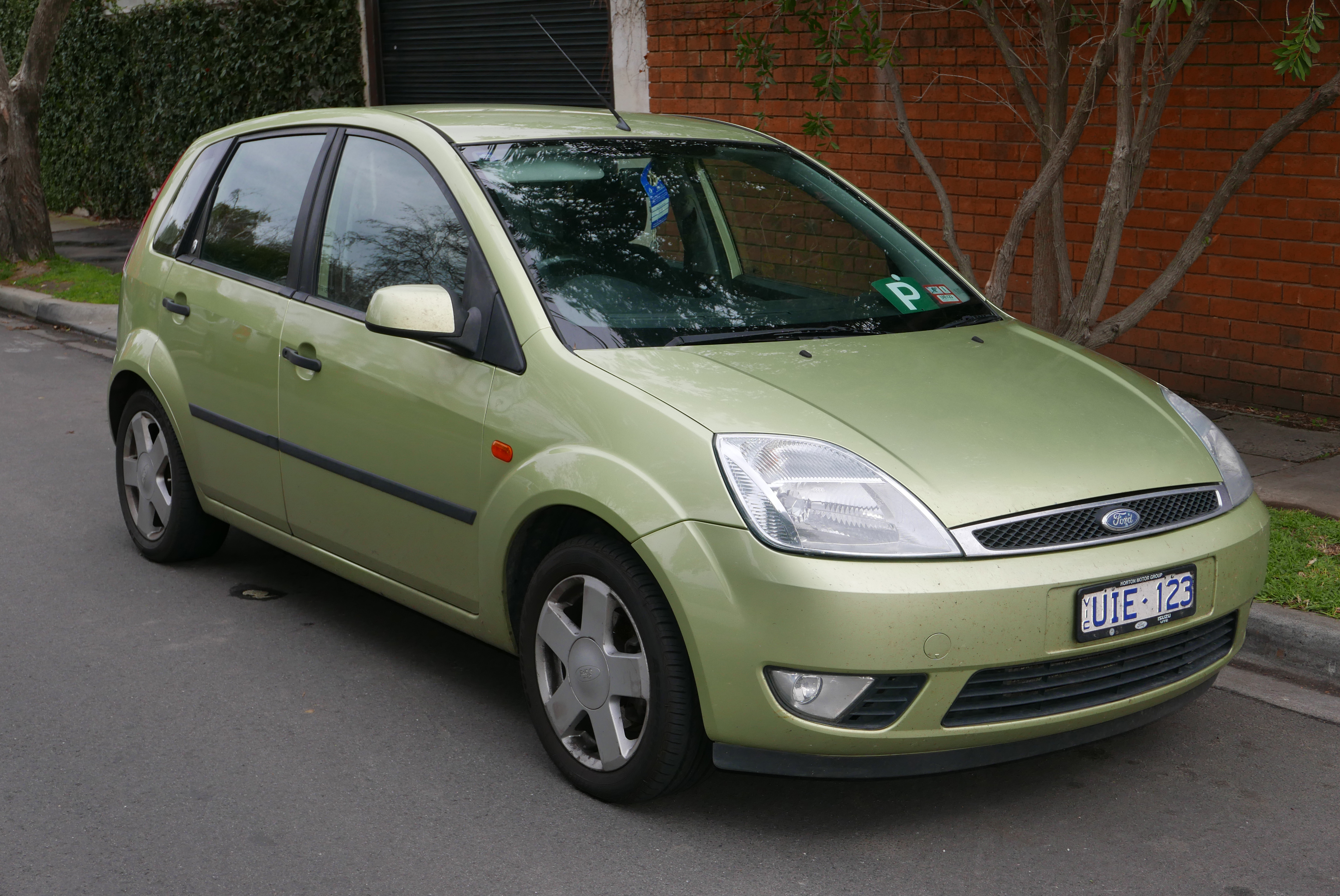

Overview
- Manufacturer: Ford
- Also called: Ford Classic; Ford Ikon
- Production: April 2002–2008 (Europe); 2002–2010 (Mexico); 2002–2014 (Brazil)
- Model years: 2003–2008; 2003–2010 (Mexico); 2003–2014 (Brazil)
- Assembly: Spain: Almussafes (Ford Valencia); Germany: Cologne (CB&A); Saarlouis (SB&A); Brazil: Camaçari (Ford Brazil); Venezuela: Valencia; India: Chennai (Ford India)

Body and chassis
- Class: Supermini (B)
- Body style: 3/5-door hatchback 4-door saloon 3-door panel van
- Layout: Front-engine, front-wheel drive
- Platform: Ford B3 platform
- Related: Ford Fusion; Ford EcoSport; Ford Figo; Mazda2

Powertrain
- Engine: petrol: 1242 cc Zetec-SE I4; 1299 cc Endura-E I4; 1398 cc Duratec I4; 1596 cc Duratec I4; 1998 cc Duratec 20 I4; diesel: 1398 cc Duratorq DLD-414 TDCi I4; 1560 cc Duratorq DLD-416 TDCi I4
- Transmission: 5-speed iB5 Durashift manual 4-speed 4F27E Durashift automatic (1.6 gasoline only); 5-speed Durashift-EST automanual (1.4 gasoline and diesel only)

Dimensions
- Wheelbase: 2,486 mm (97.9 in); 2,488 mm (98.0 in) (Brazil)
- Length: 3,918–3,924 mm (154.3–154.5 in); 3,930 mm (155 in) (Brazil, hatchback); 4,221 mm (166.2 in) (Brazil, saloon); 4,030 mm (159 in) (Trail)
- Width: 1,685 mm (66.3 in)
- Height: 1,464–1,468 mm (57.6–57.8 in); 1,451 mm (57.1 in) (Brazil, hatchback); 1,550 mm (61 in) (Trail)
- Curb weight: 1,096–1,178 kg (2,416–2,597 lb)

Chronology
- Predecessor: Ford Fiesta (fourth generation)
- Successor: Ford Fiesta (sixth generation); Ford Ikon Hatch (Mexico)

The Ford Fiesta Mk5 is the fifth generation of the Ford Fiesta supermini built in Europe between April 2002 and 2008. The Fiesta continued to be built in Mexico until 2010 and in Brazil until 2014. Most engines were carried over from the previous Fiesta.

This generation became the best-selling Ford Fiesta generation to date. This was the first Fiesta to be sold in Asia and Australasia, where it replaced the Kia-based Festiva.

== History ==
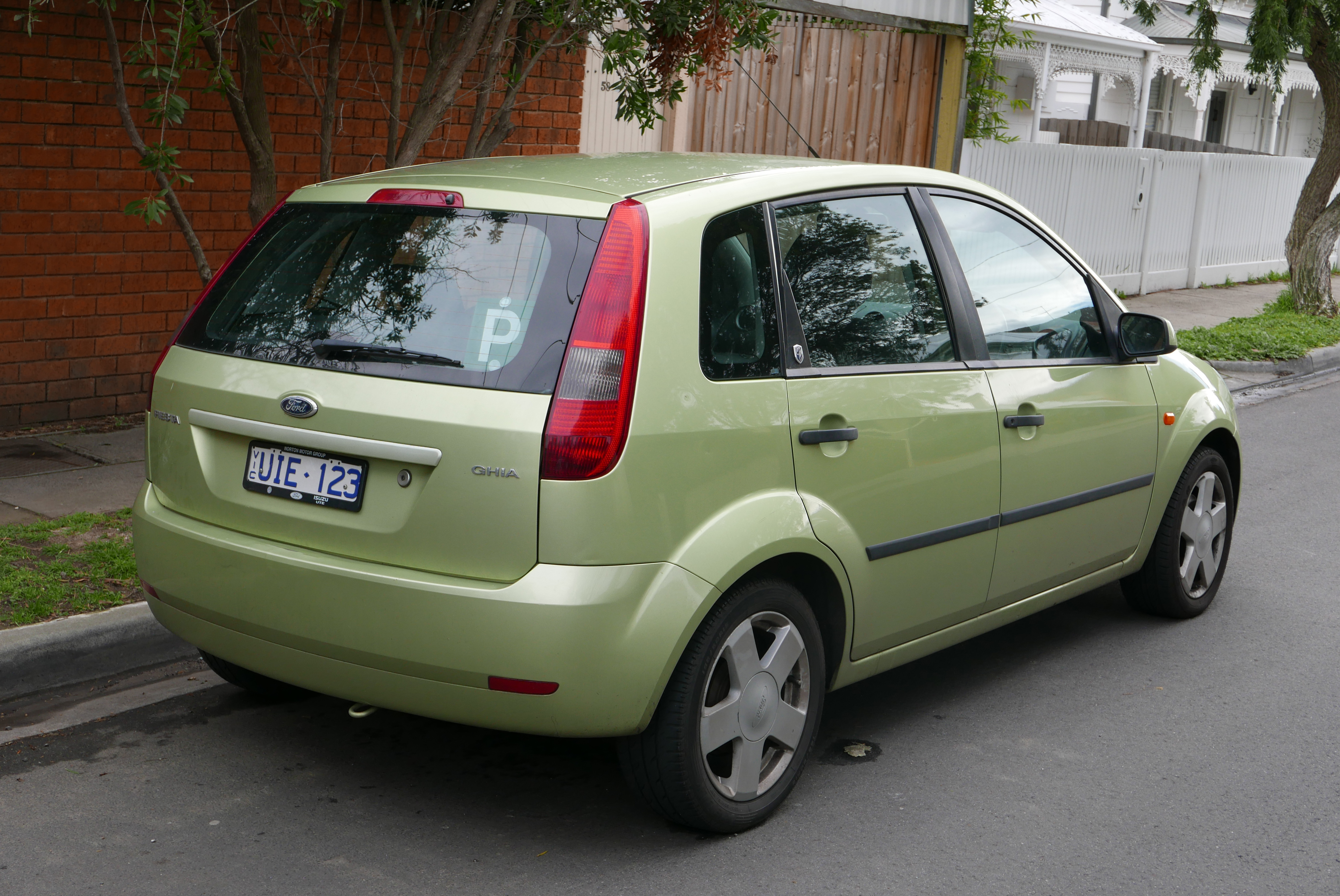
Rear view

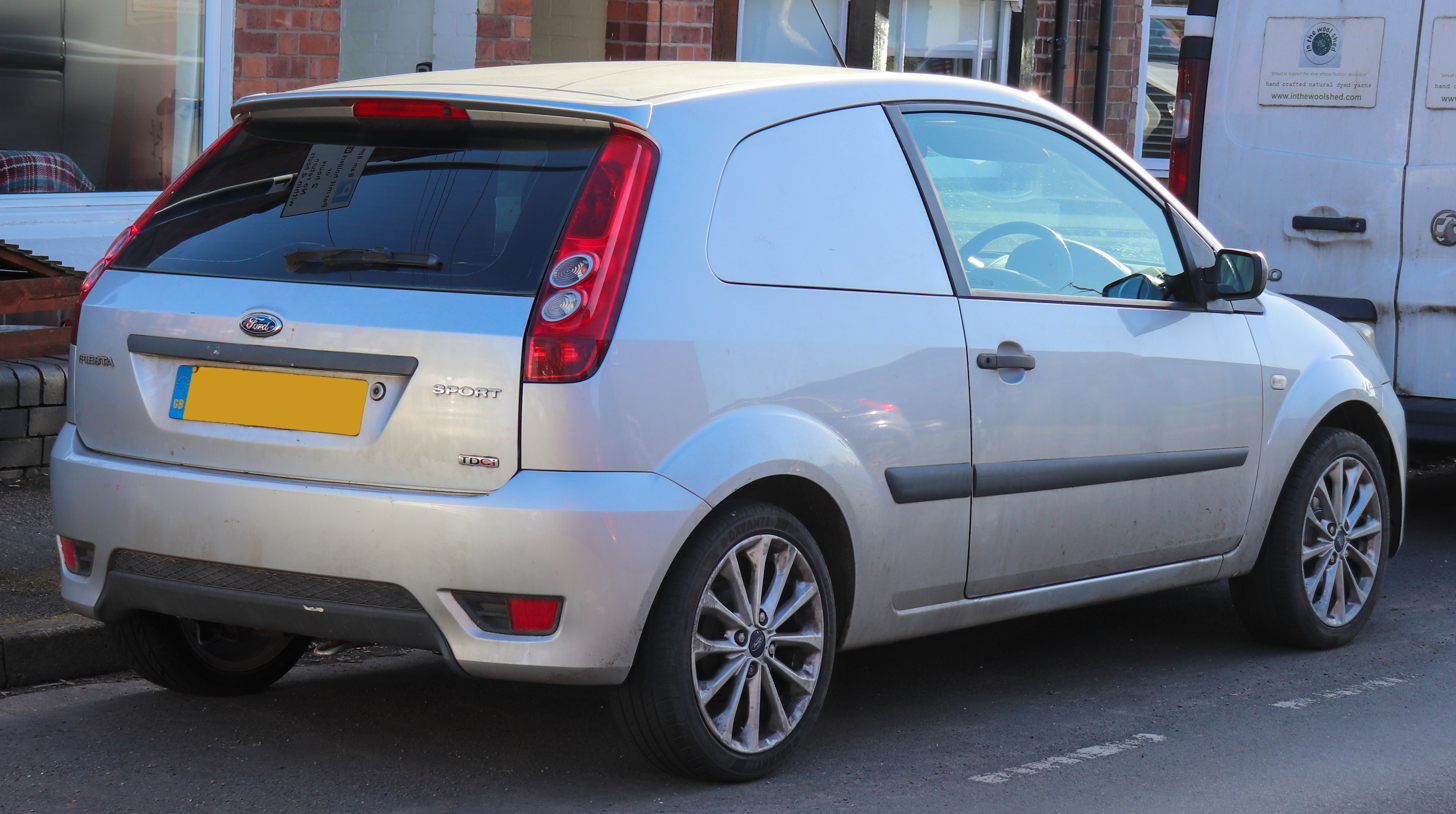
Ford Fiesta panel van

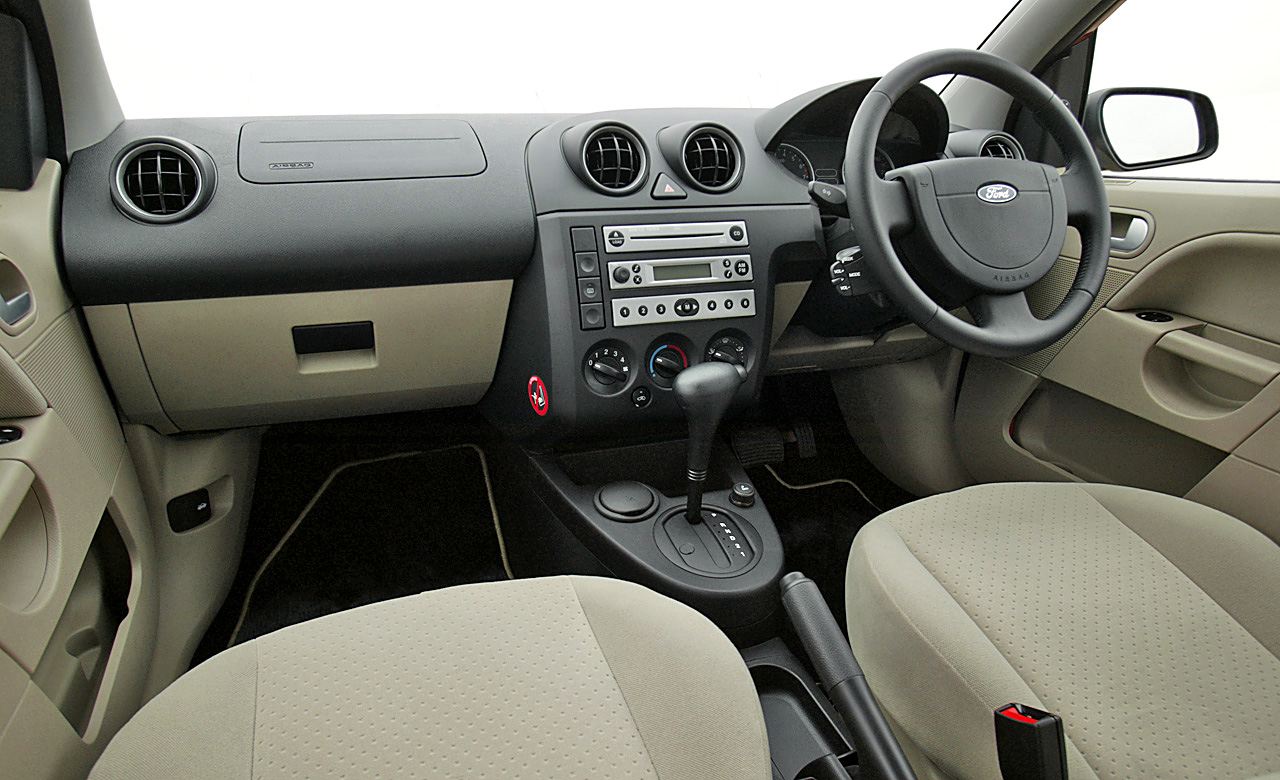
Interior

On April 1, 2002, the all-new fifth-generation car was unveiled. Production at Almussafes Plant started on April 29, 2002. Most engines were carried over from the previous Fiesta, but renamed "Duratec", as the "Zetec" name was now solely used for sportier models. The previous push-rod 1.3 L engine was initially available in the UK, but this was quickly replaced with a RoCam 1.3 L, both under the name Duratec 8v.

Trim levels available initially were Finesse, LX, Zetec, and Ghia, with limited edition variants soon following. The fifth-generation was also the first Fiesta to feature an anti-lock braking system and passenger airbags as standard. This generation became the best-selling Ford Fiesta generation to date.

Engines available include 1.25, 1.3, 1.4, 1.6, and 2.0-liter petrols, plus an 8-valve 1.4 and a 16-valve 1.6-liter Duratorq TDCi common-rail diesels built in a joint venture with PSA.

Fiestas sold in Asia and Australasia were all 1.6 L LX 3dr/5dr, Zetec 3dr, or Ghia 5dr. They replaced the Kia-based Festiva, the first time the Fiesta was marketed in those regions. In Brazil and Argentina, a Fiesta saloon version was introduced in late 2004. A similar Fiesta saloon model called the "Ikon", with a different front end, was released in India in late 2005. This Fiesta generation was ergonomically and mechanically more advanced than any previous generation. The 2005 facelift came with an improved exterior.

=== Marketing ===
==== South America ====
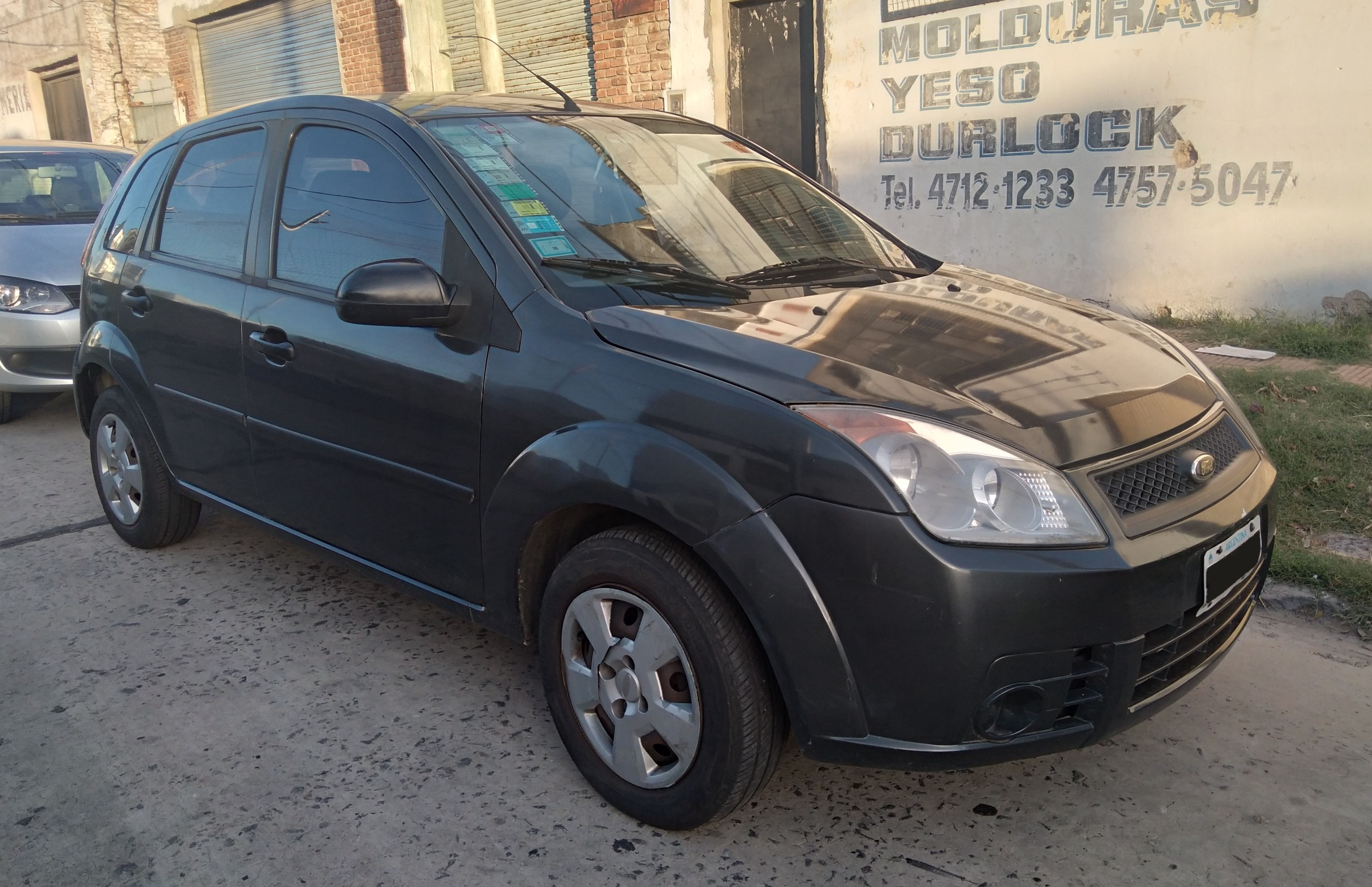
2008 Ford Fiesta facelift (Argentina)

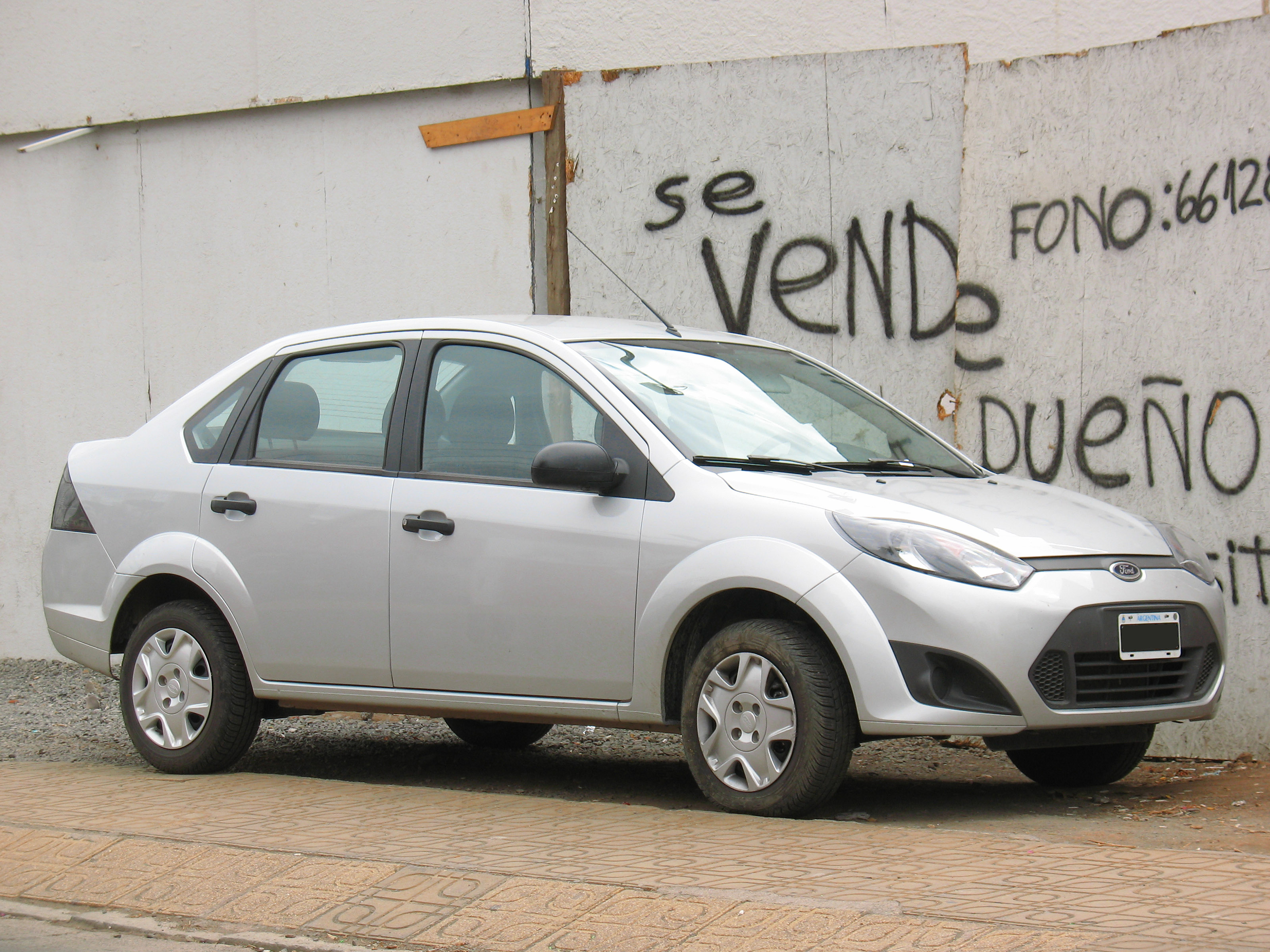
2010–2014 Ford Fiesta facelift (Argentina)

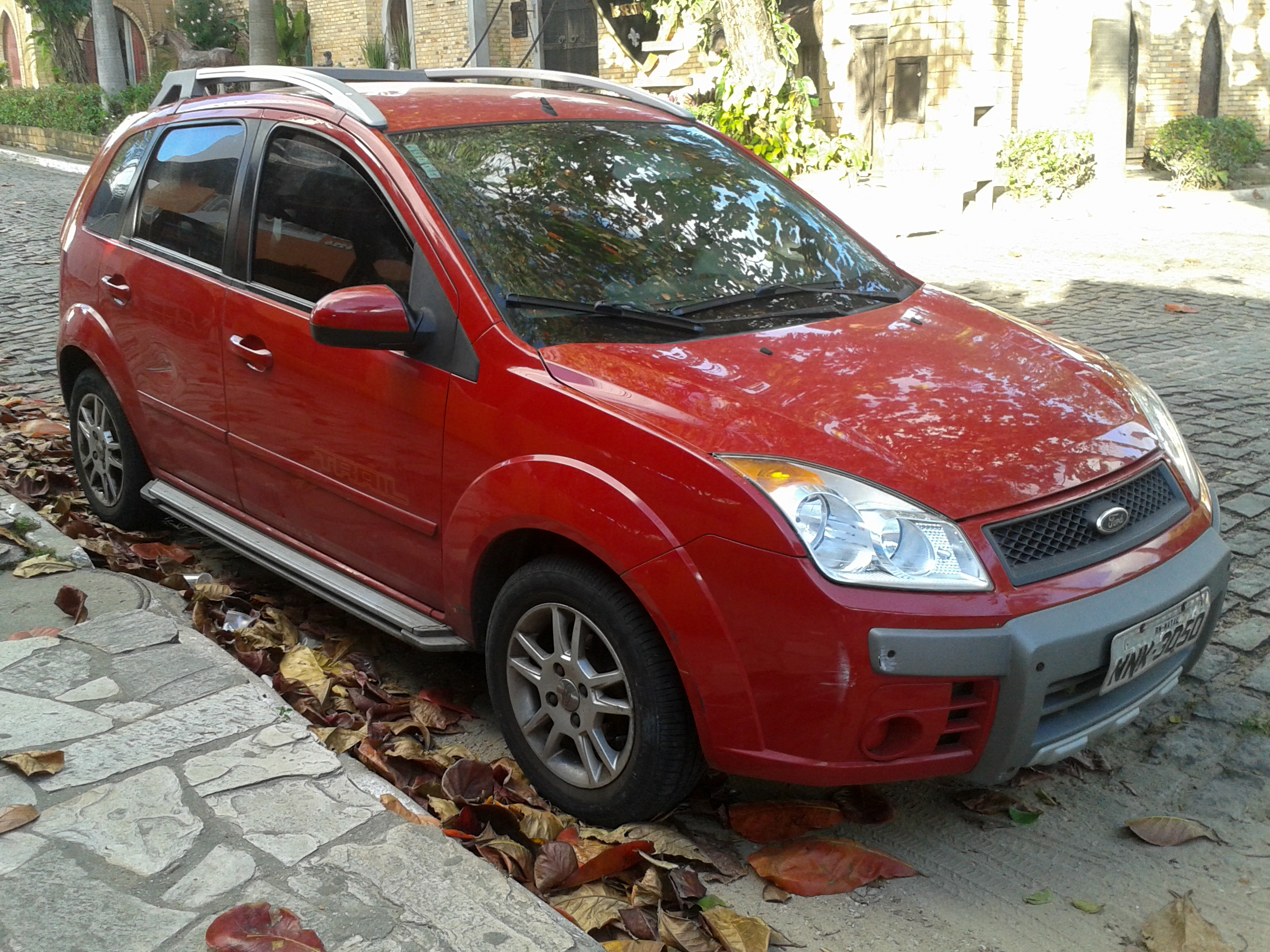
Fiesta Trail (Brazil)

In Brazil, the engine options also include 1.0 L 8v Flex and 1.6 L 8v Flex engines called Rocam, which run on ethanol, petrol, or any mixture of both. The internal codename of this model is B256 (5-door) and B257 (3-door). In other Mercosur countries the Fiesta uses a 1.6 L 98 bhp (73 kW) SOHC Zetec engine as standard, with the choice of either a 4-speed automatic or 5-speed manual transmission. A 1.4 L 68 bhp (51 kW) diesel engine is also available. For the Colombian market a 1.0 L 8v supercharged Rocam engine produced 96 bhp (72 kW); it was discontinued in 2009 and replaced by the Mark VI imported from Mexico. In Chile the model is imported from Mexico because the Mercosur model does not meet the requirements of the country.

The South American market Fiesta was facelifted in early 2007 as a 2008 model, with new rectangular headlights and grille. In early 2010 the Fiesta was facelifted as a 2011 model, with new headlights and grille very similar to those on the Mark VI Fiesta available in other markets around the world, but keeping all other features nearly the same as the previous model. Its name varies from country to country, called "Fiesta One" in Argentina, "Fiesta Move" in Venezuela, and "Fiesta Rocam" in Brazil.

==== Mexico ====
This generation was sold in Mexico until 2010 when it was replaced with the Ikon Hatch (a Ford Figo imported from India and still based on the fifth generation Fiesta). This new model coincided with the 2010 facelift and re-branding of the Fiesta Sedan to Ikon. Since the Ikon's discontinuation in 2012, the Ikon Hatch is sold alongside the sixth generation Fiesta.

==== India ====
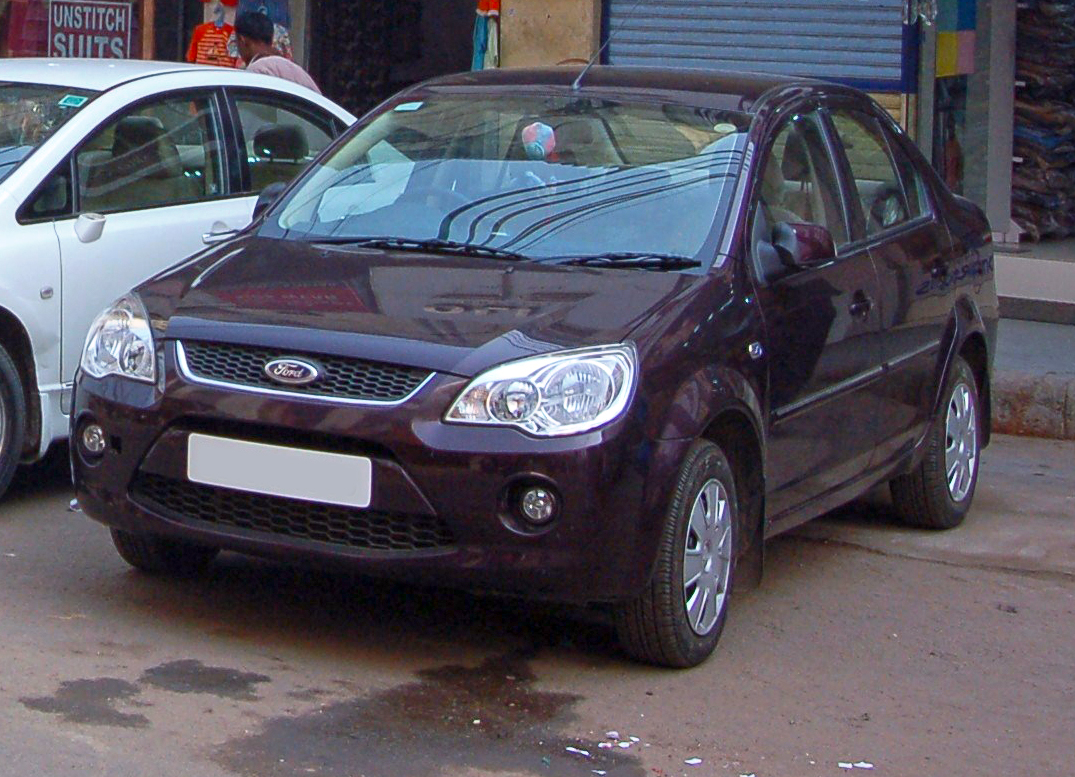
Ford Fiesta saloon in Delhi (2008 facelift model)

In the Indian market, Ford produced the Ford Ikon (based on the Mark IV model) and the fifth generation Fiesta (with a four-door, three-box bodywork only) in parallel for the saloon market until April 2011. The Fiesta was sold in India since September 2005, with either a 1.6-litre Duratec petrol engine (also in sports version namely 1.6 S) or with a 1.4 TDCi diesel engine. The bodywork was specific to the Indian market, not related to the Mark V sedan as sold in Latin America. The car sold well from the beginning, with more than two thirds of initial sales being of the more economic diesel model. In 2010, the Ford Figo was added to the range, a hatchback based on the Mark V model.

Production of the Ford Ikon was discontinued when the Bharat IV emission requirements came into effect for metropolitan areas. Ford then announced the launch of the Fiesta Mark VI at a lower price with new features including dual airbags, bringing the Fiesta in line with competitors such as the Honda City, Suzuki SX4, Volkswagen Vento and Hyundai Verna. In July, Ford introduced the sixth generation Fiesta, marketed in India only with saloon bodywork.

===== Classic =====
Around the time of the introduction of the Mark VI, in April 2011, the name of the Mark V in India was changed to "Ford Fiesta Classic".

After about a year on the market as the Ford Fiesta Classic, the rebodied version dropped the "Fiesta" portion and simply became the Ford Classic in July 2012. This coincided with a drop in prices and the introduction of a new variant called "Titanium" with a 1.6 litre Duratec petrol engine or a 1.4 TDCi diesel engine. The petrol version offers 101 PS (74 kW) while the diesel has 68 PS (50 kW).

==== Japan ====
The Fiesta was briefly sold from 2004 through 2007, sharing its platform with the Mazda Demio. The only body style was the 5-door hatchback, with the 1.6-litre engine in GLX trim, with the Fiesta ST offered only in 2005. The Fiesta Sportizm was sold in Japan and was limited to 50 cars. The model is based on the 1.6-litre GHIA and is equipped with sporty body kits, a rear spoiler, and 'Sportizm' badging on the exterior and floormats. The Sportizm was only sold in the 'Colorado Red' colour.

=== Fiesta ST/XR4 ===
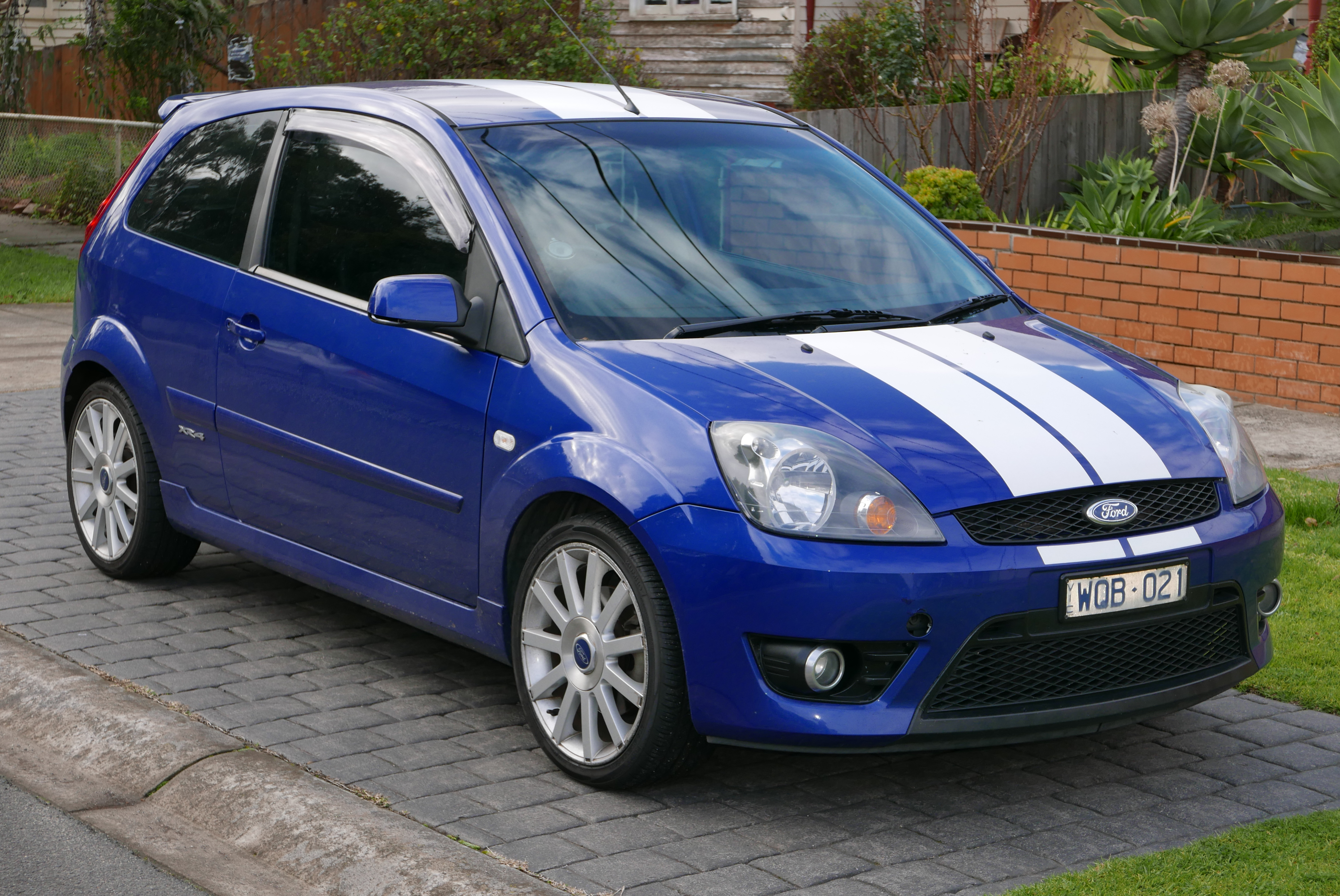
Ford Fiesta XR4 (Australia)

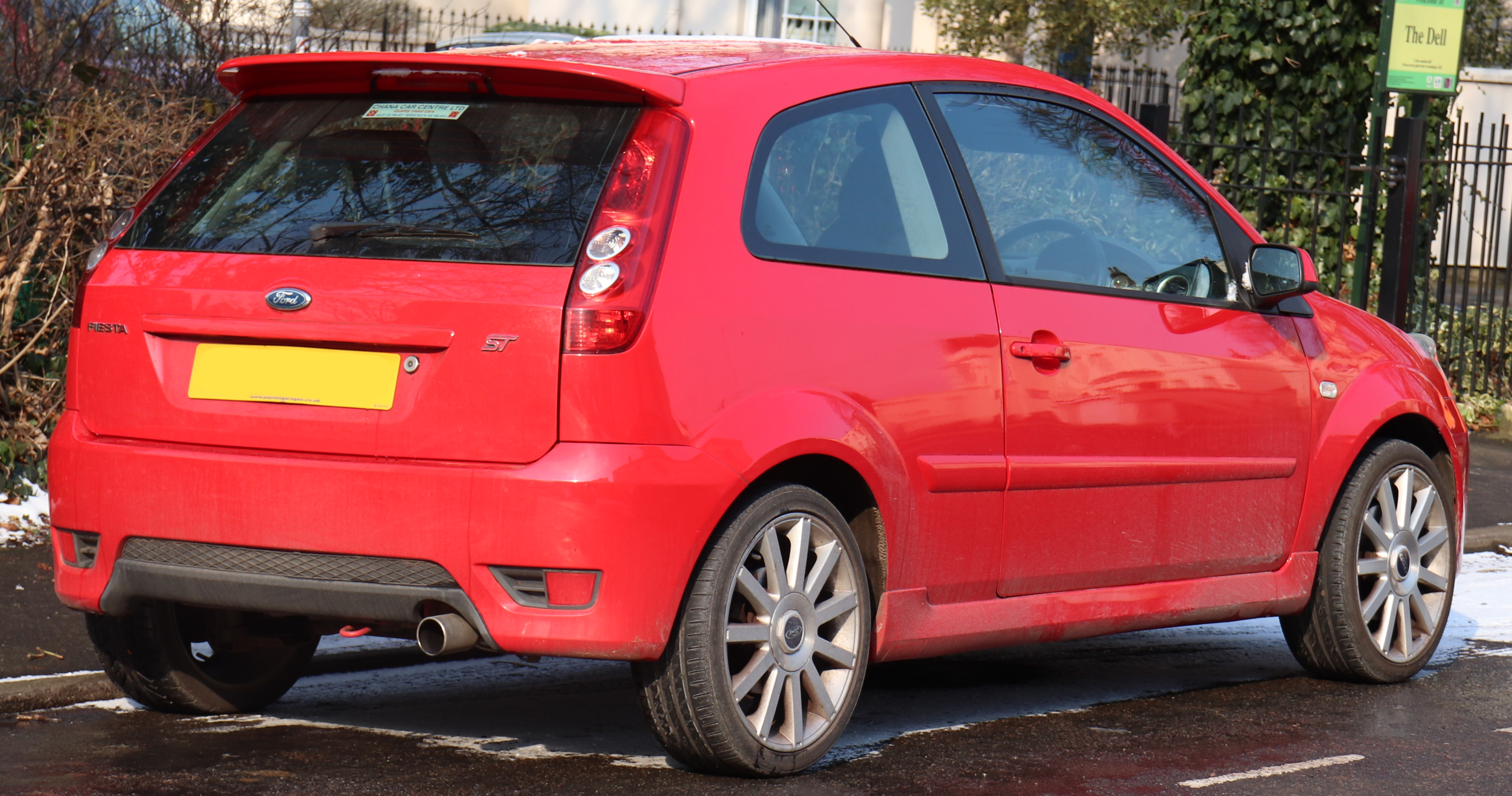
Ford Fiesta ST (Europe)

The Fiesta ST/XR4 was the performance model of this Fiesta. It includes a 2.0 L Duratec petrol engine rated at 150 PS (110 kW; 148 bhp) in standard form, with a top speed of 129 mph (208 km/h). The Fiesta ST also features 17 in (43 cm) alloy wheels, disc brakes to all wheels, different front and rear bumpers, side skirts, body colour handles and bump strips, partial leather seats or an optional extra of heated full leather seats and a ST logo on the front seat backs and on the steering wheel.

In Australia, the Fiesta ST was sold as the Fiesta XR4. To stay in line with all sports model Fords sold in Australia it received the 'XR' badging, instead of the 'ST' badging used in Europe.

The vehicle was unveiled at the 2004 Geneva Motor Show.

=== Fiesta RallyeConcept ===
The Fiesta RallyeConcept is a British 3-door concept car designed by Ford RallyeSport and Ford Design Europe, designed for the Super 1600 rally. The 1.6 L Duratec engine was rated 200 bhp (150 kW; 200 PS). It includes four-two-one Arvin Meritor exhaust, 6-speed Hewland sequential gearbox, MacPherson strut front and twist-beam rear suspensions, 15-spoke magnesium wheels with 18" Pirelli P-Zero tyres.

The car was unveiled at the 2002 Birmingham Auto Show.

=== Fiesta RS concept ===
This is a concept model based on the 2002 Fiesta RallyeConcept. It includes many of the RallyeConcept Fiesta features such as the cooling vents in the front bumper, deep side rockers, white ceramic-coated brake calipers, and exhaust tips, and a large rear spoiler. It also includes 18-inch alloy wheels with low-profile tyres, extended wheel arches, and lowered and stiffened suspension. The engine is rated at over 180 bhp (130 kW).

=== Facelift ===
In November 2005, a revised version of the fifth-generation Fiesta was launched for the 2006 model year, also known as the Mk 5 facelift (Mk5.5). The exterior changes include new bumpers and grille, new headlamps, new rear lamps, redesigned door mirrors, and thicker body side mouldings, with body coloured handles, mirrors, and side mouldings on selected models. New vibrant exterior colours were added, to include 'Tango Red', 'Amethyst', 'Sublime' and 'Apple'.

Inside, the redesign concentrated on improving the feeling of quality and space. This included a new fascia, with easier to read 'analogue' instruments, and a soft-feel upper section to the instrument panel, following criticisms of the hard and cheaply textured original. The facelift also included a range of new 'big car' technologies, including Voice Control, Bluetooth, a trip computer, Electronic Automatic Temperature Control (EATC), rain-sensing wipers, automatic headlights, power-fold door mirrors, and MP3 connectivity. These new features were publicised in the UK through a 'Clever Fiesta, Stupid Dogbot' TV advertising campaign, and Ford microsite. In the UK, the car was initially available in Studio, Style, Style Climate, Zetec, Zetec Climate, Zetec S, ST and Ghia trim levels. This was the last Fiesta sold with the Ghia trim level.

The changes had an immediate effect on sales. After years being outsold by Vauxhall's Corsa, among others, in February 2006 Ford announced sales in the preceding month were up 25% in January 2005 for the previous model. Furthermore, the Fiesta captured the title of Britain's most popular supermini in both 2006 and 2007, for the first time since 2001.

Pre-facelift styling

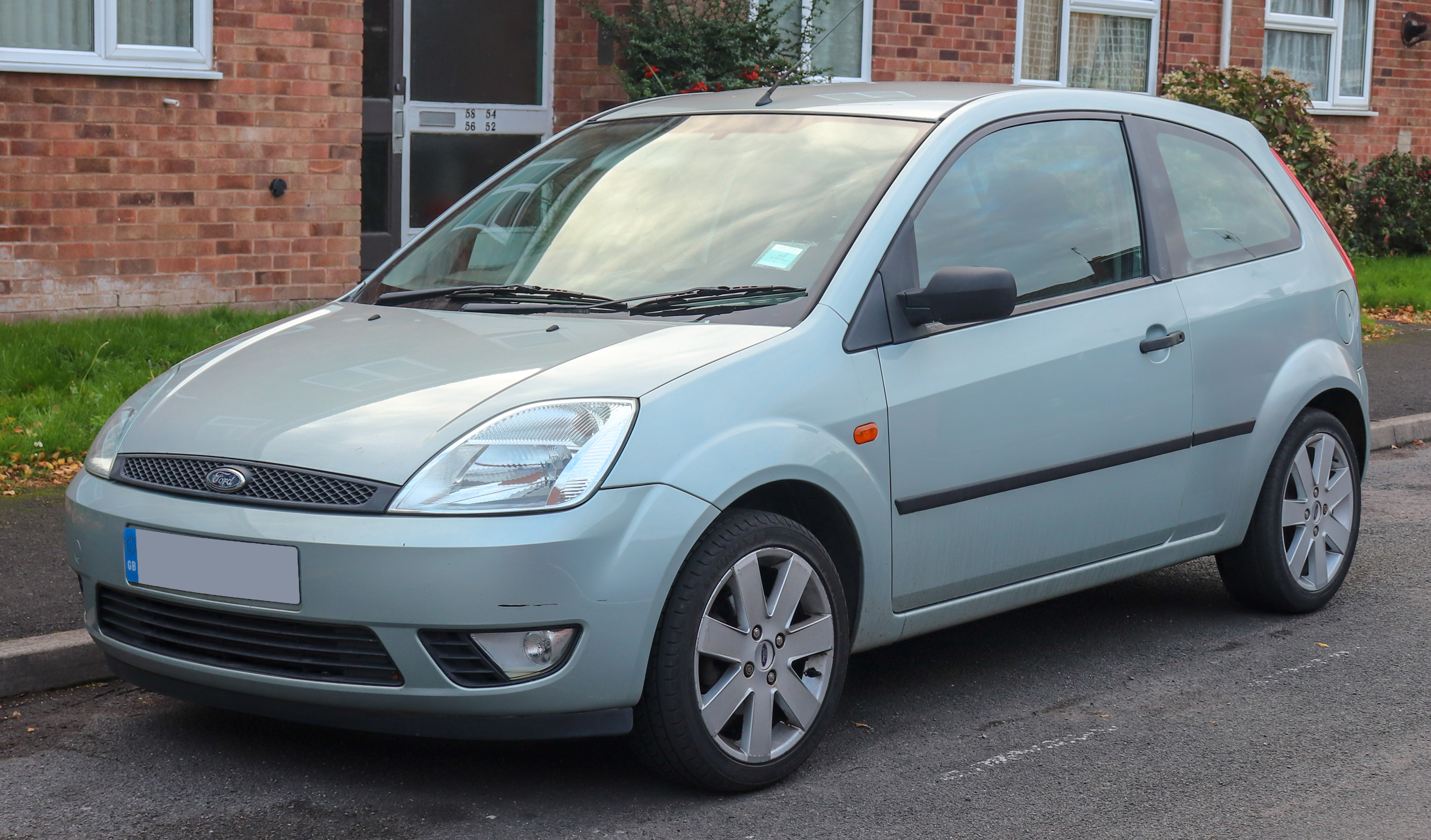
Front

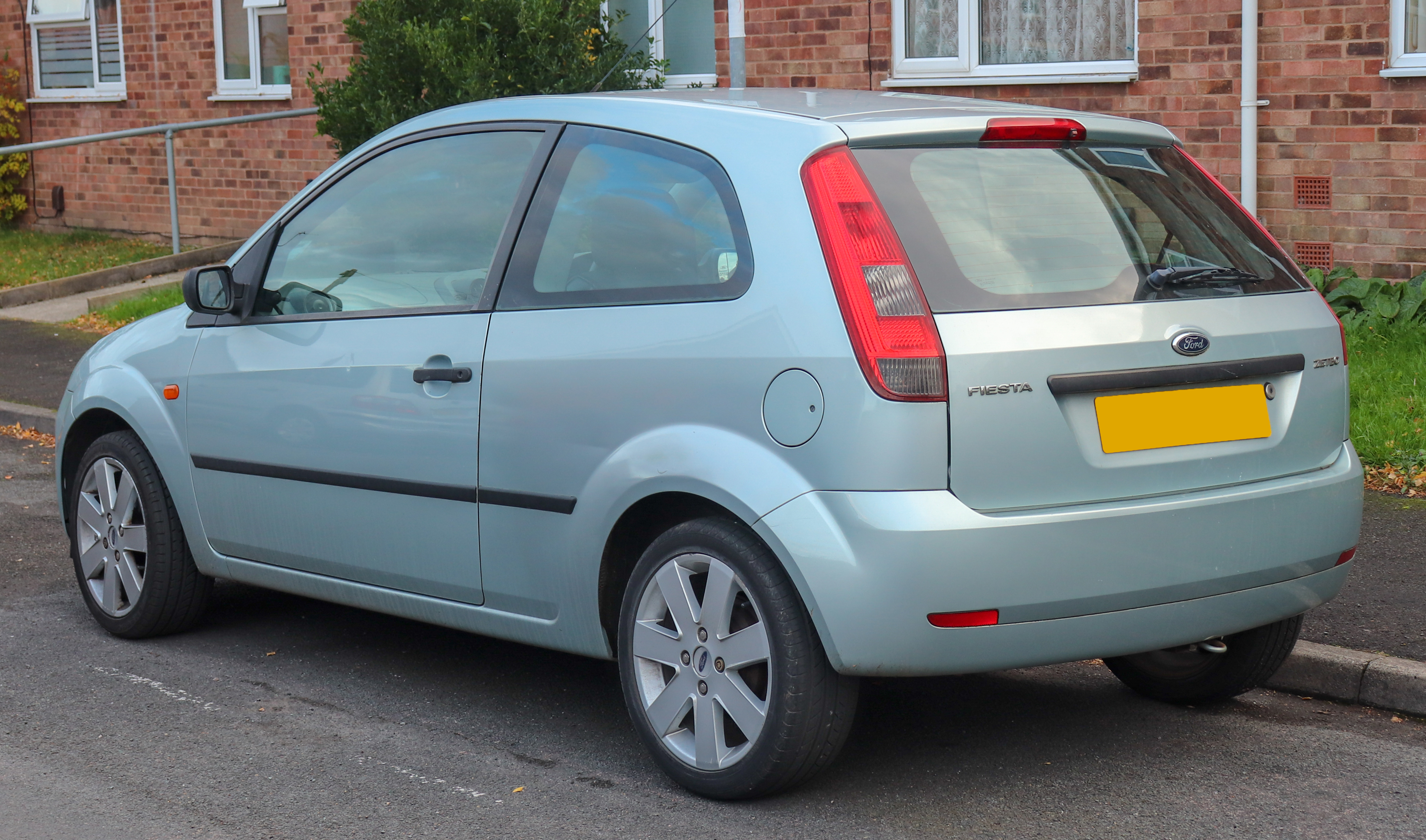
Rear

Post-facelift styling

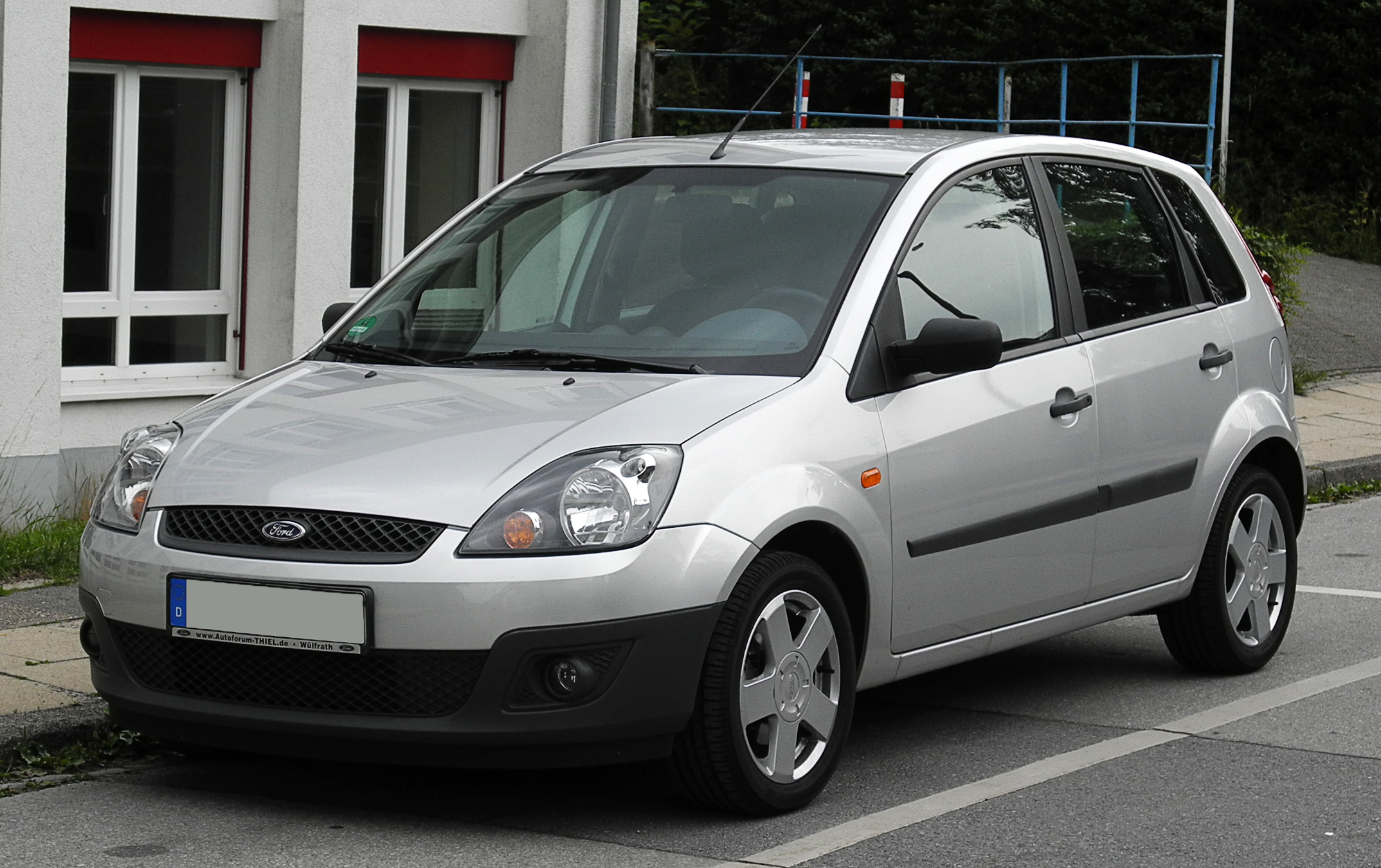
Front

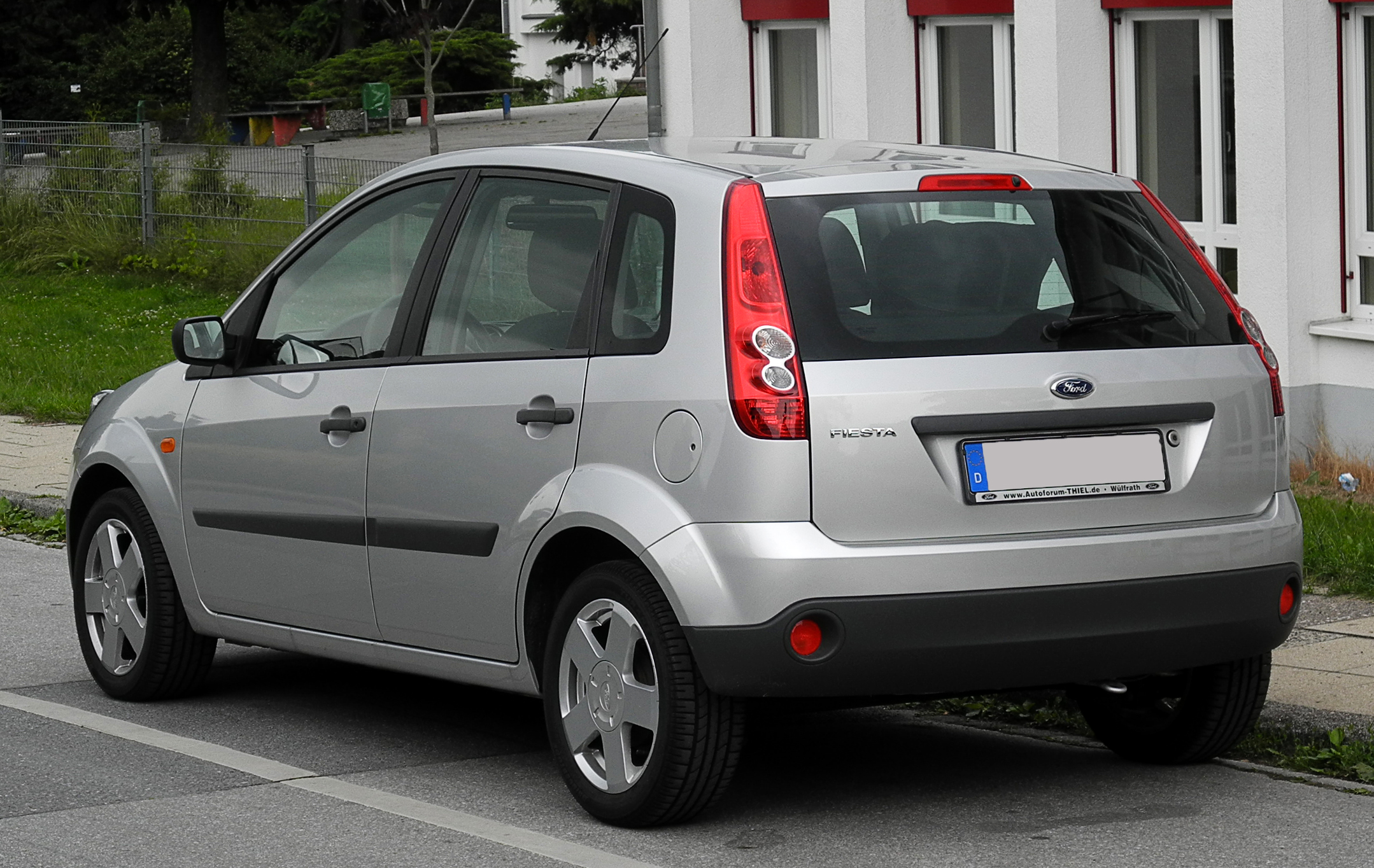
Rear

==== Limited editions ====
The Zetec S "Anniversary" was a limited edition of 400 cars based on the Zetec S and included a Radian Yellow body, chequered roof, black mirrors and door handle, tinted glass, 16 inch alloy wheels, black roof spoiler, sports seats, leather trim, an alarm, and an iPod socket.

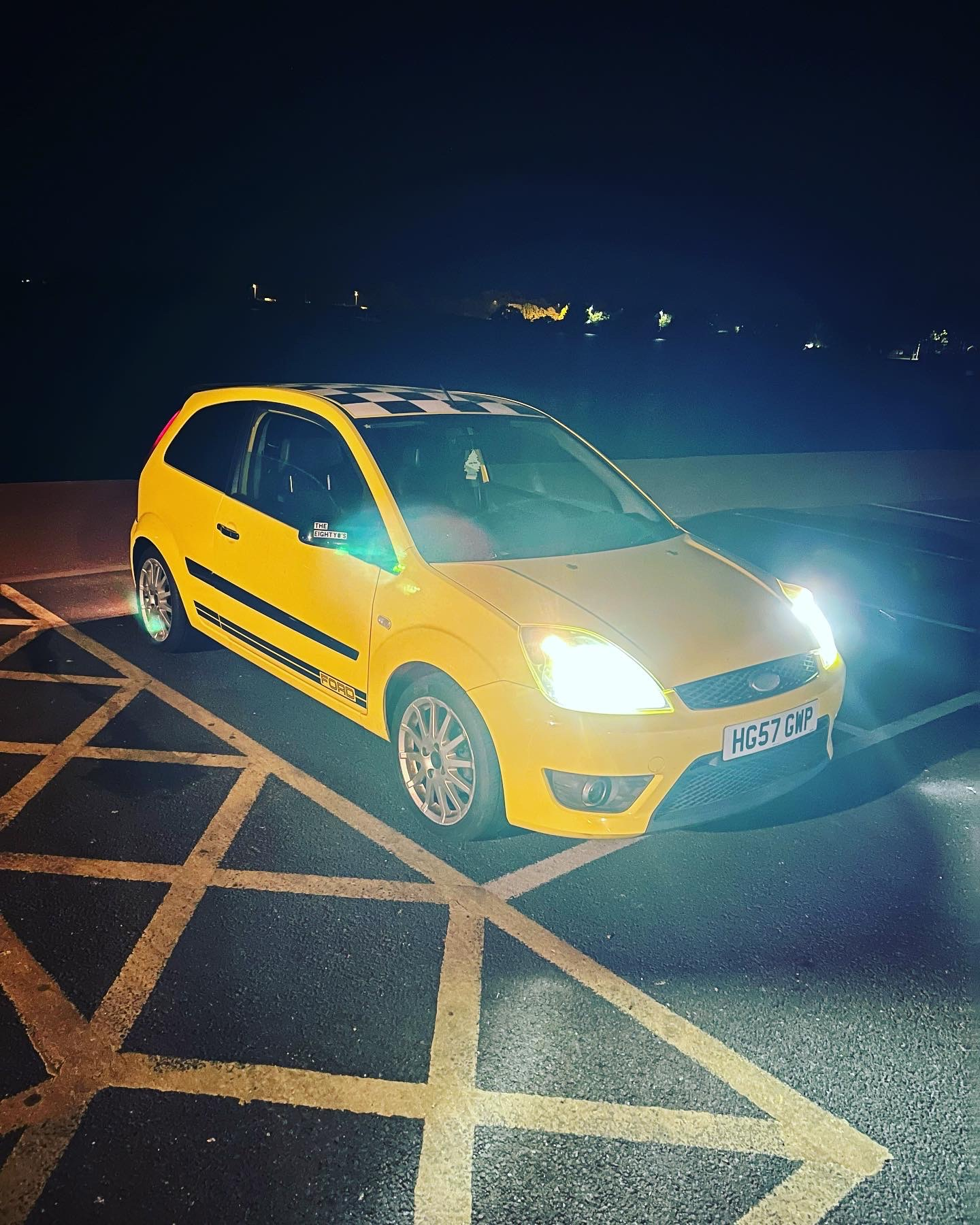
Ford Fiesta Zetec-S 30th Anniversary in Radian Yellow No. 335/400

The car went on sale in the UK in March 2007 for £12,595. Despite the name, the Ford Fiesta was actually 31 years old when the anniversary model was released.

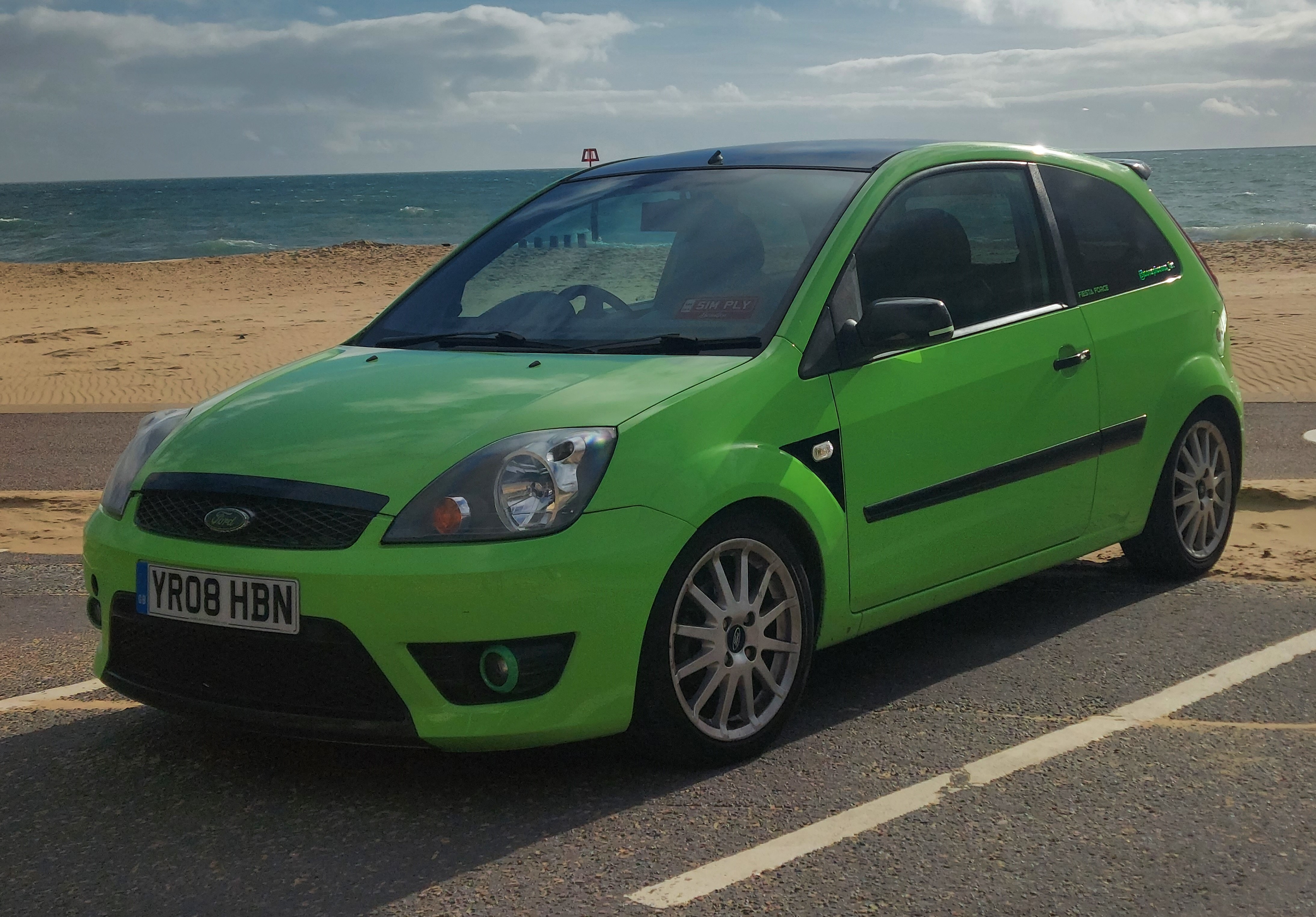
Zetec S Celebration 462

The Zetec S "Celebration" was a limited (400 cars) edition based on the Zetec S and included a Celebration Green body, black and white chequered roof decal, unique identity number, chequered scuff plates and mats, full 'Ebony Haze' leather interior, privacy glass, and Panther Black door mirrors, bodyside mouldings, roof spoiler, tailgate handle, 16 inch alloy wheels, air conditioning, a trip computer, electric windows, CD player with portable music connection socket, sports front seats and lowered sports suspension.

The car went on sale in the UK for £12,595.

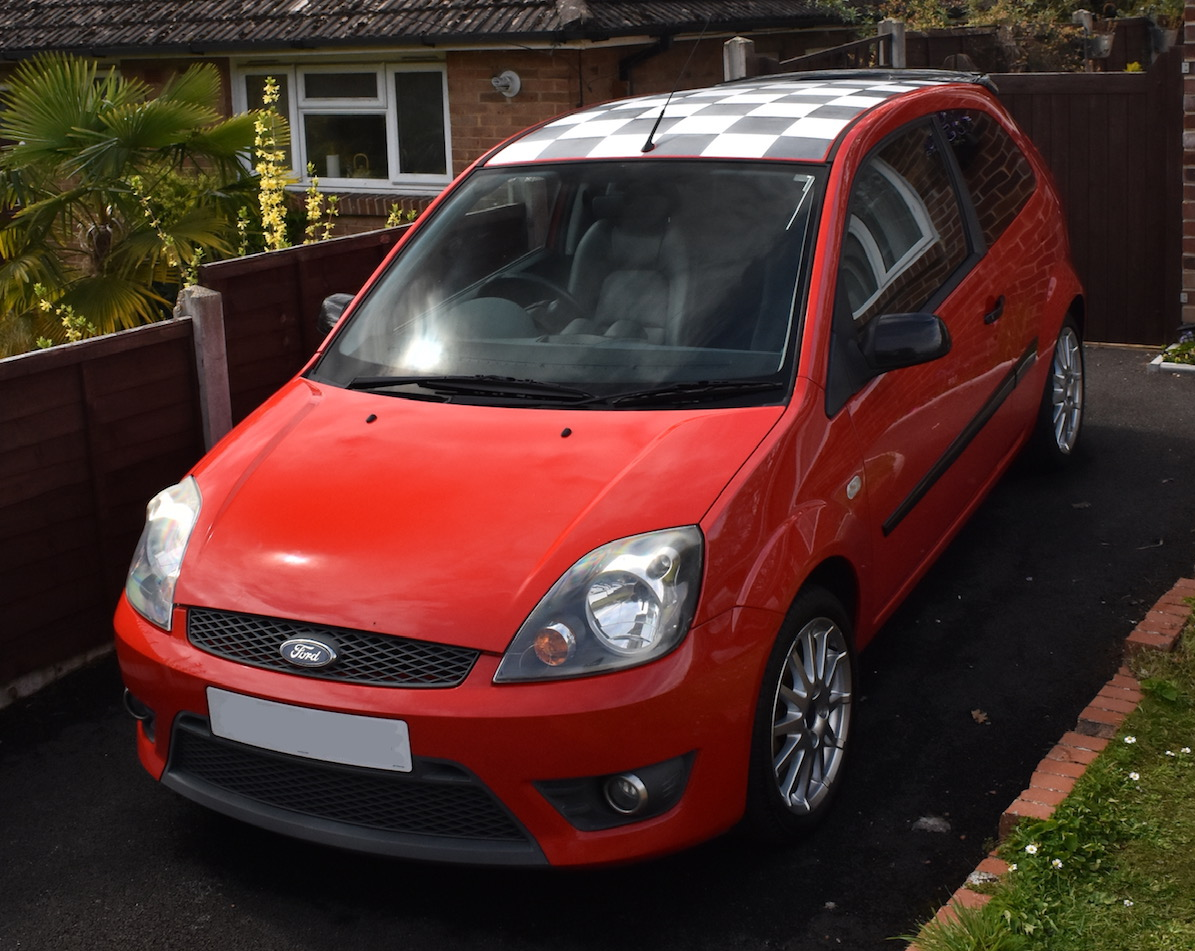
Zetec S Red 1080

The Zetec S Red was a limited (400 cars) edition based on the Zetec S and included a Colorado Red body, black-and-white chequered roof decal, dark privacy glass on the rear windows, panther black door mirrors, door handles, bodyside mouldings, roof spoiler and tailgate handle; Quickclear heated front windscreen, ebony leather seats, 16 inch alloy wheels, air conditioning and heated electrically operated door mirrors.

The car went on sale in the UK for £13,000.

==== Mountune Performance upgrade for Fiesta ST ====
In 2008, Ford offered Mountune Performance options for Fiesta ST vehicles, available at specialist British Ford dealers beginning in March 2008. These were developed by Roush Technologies Ltd, which owns the Mountune Racing motorsport brand. The Mountune Performance Stage 1 (£1,435) includes a high flow catalyst and tubular manifold, and re-calibration of the engine to produce 165 PS (121 kW; 163 bhp). The Mountune Performance Stage 2 package (£1,838) adds new camshafts and valve springs to the basic package to deliver 185 PS (136 kW; 182 bhp).

The ST 500 was a limited production (500 vehicles) model of the Fiesta ST. It includes 17 in (43 cm) 11-spoke black alloy wheels, red brake callipers and carbon fibre pattern interior trim. The interior also features a Sony audio system and ebony leather heated seats. The vehicle cost £15,000.

==== Zetec Blue ====
In November 2007 Ford announced the special edition 'Zetec Blue', introduced as a 'swan song' for the UK Mk5. The Zetec Blue was available as a 3 or 5-door, with a choice of the 1.25 and 1.4 petrol, and 1.4TDCi diesel engines. Prices started at £9,995; in between the existing Style Climate and Zetec Climate models. The seat trim was a unique blue derivative of the 'Kyoto' type featured in the Style Climate, and whilst the Zetec Blue didn't feature a chrome grille; the model was otherwise specified as the Zetec Climate model, adding additionally; 16" 7-spoke alloy wheels, Sony CD audio system with remote controls and premium speakers, and co-ordinated blue bezel, air vent and gaiter surrounds. To boost final sales before the introduction of the Mk6, the specification of the Zetec Blue was increased in the summer of 2008, with the inclusion of Bluetooth and Voice Control, and the Technology Pack (automatic headlights, rain-sensing wipers, power-fold door mirrors) as standard, which was promoted until September 30, 2008.

=== Specifications ===
Engine types	Inline-4: Petrol, Duratec (OHV), Zetec-SE and Duratec 20 (OHC), and Diesel, Duratorq DLD-414 and Duratorq DLD-416 (OHC)
Capacity	1,242–1,998 cc (75.8–121.9 cu in)
Power	60–150 bhp (45–112 kW)
Max. speed	94–130 mph (151–209 km/h)
Acceleration	0–60 mph (97 km/h) 18.8–7.9 seconds

== Safety ==
ANCAP test results* Ford Fiesta 1.4 litre European model as tested (2004)
Test	Score
Overall	4 /5 stars
Frontal offset	10.98/16
Side impact	13.86/16
Pole	Not assessed
Seat belt reminders	0/3
Whiplash protection	Not assessed
Pedestrian protection	Marginal
Electronic stability control	Not available

Overall score 24.84 out of 37.
