= Ford Duratec engine =

Overview
- Manufacturer: Ford of Germany; Mazda; Volvo Cars
- Also called: Mazda L Volvo Modular; Sigma; Duratec V6
- Production: 1993–present

Layout
- Configuration: I3, I4, I5 and 60° V6
- Displacement: I3 1.0: 998 cc; I3 1.1: 1084 cc; I4 1.25: 1242 cc; I4 1.3: 1297–1299 cc; I4 1.4: 1388 cc; I4 1.5: 1499 cc; I4 1.6: 1596 cc; I4 1.8: 1798 cc; I4 2.0: 1999 cc; I5 2.5: 2521 cc; V6 2.5: 2544 cc; V6 3.0: 2967 cc
- Cylinder head material: Aluminum
- Valvetrain: DOHC with Direct Acting Mechanical Buckets (DAMB); Variable camshaft timing

Combustion
- Fuel type: Gasoline multi-port or direct injection

Chronology
- Predecessor: Ford Zetec engine
- Successor: Ecoboost

Ford Duratec engine is a line of engines used by Ford of Europe and United States for the company's range of gasoline-powered I3, I4, I5 and V6 passenger car engines. The first Duratec engine was co-designed by Ford and Porsche and introduced as the Duratec V6 in the 1993 Ford Mondeo.

Ford would subsequently brand other gasoline engines unrelated to the original V6 with the Duratec name. The Ford Zeta engine, Ford Sigma engine and Ford Cyclone engine all carry the Duratec name, but are otherwise unrelated to each other or the original 1993 Duratec V6. The ambiguous use of the name is similar to Ford's use of the Zetec for the previous generation of gasoline engines, the Duratorq name for diesel engines, and EcoBoost for turbocharged gasoline engines.

== Applications ==
=== 1.0 Duratec Ti-VCT ===
- Ford Fiesta (sixth generation)

=== 1.1 Duratec Ti-VCT ===
- Ford Fiesta (seventh generation)

=== 1.25 Duratec/Duratec Ti-VCT ===
- Ford Fiesta (fourth generation)
- Ford Fiesta (fifth generation)
- Ford Fiesta (sixth generation)
- Ford Fusion (Europe)

=== 1.3 Duratec ===
- Ford Fiesta (fourth generation)
- Ford Fiesta (fifth generation)
- Ford Ka

=== 1.4 Duratec/Duratec Ti-VCT ===
- Ford Fiesta (fourth generation)
- Ford Fiesta (fifth generation)
- Ford Fiesta (sixth generation)
- Ford Focus (first generation)
- Ford Focus (second generation)
- Ford Fusion (Europe)
- Ford B-MAX

=== 1.5 Duratec Ti-VCT ===
- Ford Fiesta (sixth generation)
- Ford Focus (fourth generation)
- Ford Ecosport

=== 1.6 Duratec SE/Duratec Ti-VCT ===
- Ford Fiesta (fourth generation)
- Ford Fiesta (fifth generation)
- Ford Fiesta (sixth generation)
- Ford Focus (first generation)
- Ford Focus (second generation)
- Ford Focus (third generation)
- Ford Fusion (Europe)
- Ford Mondeo (third generation)
- Ford B-MAX
- Ford C-MAX
- Ford SportKa
- Ford StreetKa
- Volvo C30
- Volvo S40
- Volvo V50

=== 1.8 Duratec HE/Duratec SCi/Duratec FFV ===
- Ford Focus (first generation)
- Ford Focus (second generation)
- Ford C-MAX
- Ford S-MAX
- Ford Galaxy
- Ford Mondeo (second generation)
- Ford Transit Connect
- Mazda 6
- Mazda 5
- Mazda MX-5
- Volvo C30
- Volvo S40
- Volvo V50

=== 2.0 Duratec 20/Duratec HE/Duratec HE Ti-VCT ===
- Ford Focus (first generation)
- Ford Focus (second generation, Europe)
- Ford Fiesta ST Mk5
- Caterham 7
- Ford Focus (second generation, North America)
- Ford EcoSport Titanium
- Ford C-Max
- Ford S-Max
- Ford Galaxy
- Ford Mondeo (second generation)
- Ford Mondeo (third generation)
- Ford Transit Connect
- Mazda MX-5 (NC)
- Mazda 3
- Mazda 5
- Mazda 6
- Mazda MPV
- Volvo C30
- Volvo S40
- Volvo V50
- Volvo V70

=== 2.3 Duratec Ti-VCT ===
- Ford Focus (first generation)
- Ford Focus (second generation, North America)
- Ford S-MAX
- Ford Galaxy
- Ford Mondeo (third generation)
- Mazda MPV
- Mazda 6

=== 2.5 Duratec 5cyl/Duratec Turbo ===
- Ford Focus (second generation, Europe)
- Ford Kuga
- Ford S-MAX
- Ford Galaxy
- Ford Mondeo (third generation)
- Volvo C30
- Volvo C70
- Volvo S40
- Volvo S60
- Volvo V50
- Volvo V70

=== 2.5 Duratec V6 ===
- Ford Mondeo (first generation)
- Ford Mondeo (second generation)
- Ford Contour and Mercury Mystique
- Mercury Cougar (eighth generation)

=== 3.0 Duratec V6 ===
- Ford Mondeo (second generation)
- Mazda 6
- Ford Five Hundred
- Ford Freestyle
- Mercury Montego
- Ford Taurus
- Ford Escape
- Ford Fusion
- Mercury Milan
- Lincoln Zephyr

== Names reference ==
Name	Family	Displacements	Year	Features
Duratec Ti-VCT	Ford Fox engine	1.0 L (998 cc; 60.9 cu in)	2012–present	DOHC I3
Duratec Ti-VCT	Ford Duratec engine	1.1 L (1,084 cc; 66.1 cu in)	2017–present	DOHC I3
Duratec 8v	Ford Sigma engine (Zetec RoCam)	1.3 L (1,297 cc; 79.1 cu in); 1.6 L (1,597 cc; 97.5 cu in)	2000–2014	DOHC I4
Duratec SE	Ford Sigma engine	1.25 L (1242 cc); 1.4 L (1,388 cc; 84.7 cu in); 1.6 L (1,596 cc; 97.4 cu in)	2002–present	DOHC I4
Duratec Ti-VCT	Ford Sigma engine	1.5 L (1,499 cc; 91.5 cu in)	2013–present	DOHC
Duratec Ti-VCT	Ford Sigma engine	1.6 L (1,596 cc; 97.4 cu in)	2004–present	DOHC
Duratec-ST; Duratec RS	Ford Zeta engine	2.0 L (1,999 cc; 122.0 cu in)	1998–2004	DOHC I4
Duratec-ST; Duratec RS	Volvo Modular engine	2.5 L (2,521 cc; 153.8 cu in)	2003–2010	Turbocharged DOHC I5
Duratec	Mazda L engine	1.8 L (1,798 cc; 109.7 cu in); 2.0 L (1,999 cc; 122.0 cu in); 2.3 L (2,261 cc; 138.0 cu in); 2.5 L (2,488 cc; 151.8 cu in)	2001–present	DOHC I4
Duratec SCi	Mazda L engine	1.8 L (1,798 cc; 109.7 cu in)	2003–2007	DOHC GDI I4 Ti-VCT
Duratec-HE; Duratec FFV	Mazda L engine	1.8 L (1,798 cc; 109.7 cu in); 2.0 L (1,999 cc; 122.0 cu in)	2005–present	DOHC I4
Duratec-HE Ti-VCT	Mazda L engine	2.0 L (1,999 cc; 122.0 cu in)	2010–present	DOHC GDI I4
Duratec V6	Ford Duratec V6 engine	2.5 L (2,544 cc; 155.2 cu in)	1993–2007	DOHC V6
Duratec V6	Ford Duratec V6 engine	3.0 L (2,967 cc; 181.1 cu in)	2002–2007	DOHC V6
