= Schools Catalogue Information Service =

Australian cataloguing service created for school libraries

Schools Catalogue Information Service (SCIS) creates and distributes metadata for English-language resources used in K-12 schools, primarily for integration with integrated library systems. As of 2019, 93 per cent of Australian schools and 49 per cent of New Zealand schools are subscribed, with a total of 107 international schools also subscribed, across 22 countries.

== Data and Standards ==
As well as doing original cataloguing, SCIS maintains the SCIS Subject Headings List (SCISSHL), an alternative to the Library of Congress Subject Headings suited to use in K-12 education contexts, and the SCIS Standards for Cataloguing And Data Entry (SSCDE). SSCDE reflects international standards including Resource Description and Access and International Standard Bibliographic Description with adaptations to suit the K-12 education sector.

SCIS catalogues bibliographic and audio-visual resources, both physical and digital, including trade fiction and non-fiction and educational materials. SCIS metadata includes full and abridged Dewey Decimal Classification, subject headings from SCISSHL and the linked-data Schools Online Thesaurus, and name and series authorities maintained by SCIS. SCIS data supports MAchine-Readable Cataloguing and Metadata Object Description Schema formats and is made available to subscribing schools via the z39.50 protocol and via an online portal

== Background ==
SCIS is a business unit of Education Services Australia (ESA). ESA is a not-for-profit government business enterprise established from a 2009 merger of Curriculum Corporation and Education.au, with the purpose of delivering educational technology solutions. Australian Schools Catalogue Information Service (ASCIS) was created in 1984 with funding from Australia's Commonwealth Schools Commission, with the purpose of reducing the cost and duplication of effort of cataloguing resources in schools. This closely followed the 1981 creation of the Australian Bibliographic Network, set up to support shared bibliographic data for university, state, public and special libraries. The newly formed Curriculum Corporation subsumed ASCIS in 1989. The name SCIS was adopted when the New Zealand government joined the board of Curriculum Corporation in 1992.

== Use ==
As of 2019, 93 per cent of Australian schools and 49 per cent of New Zealand schools are subscribed, with a total of 107 international schools are also subscribed, across 22 countries.
