= 2019 European Rally Championship =

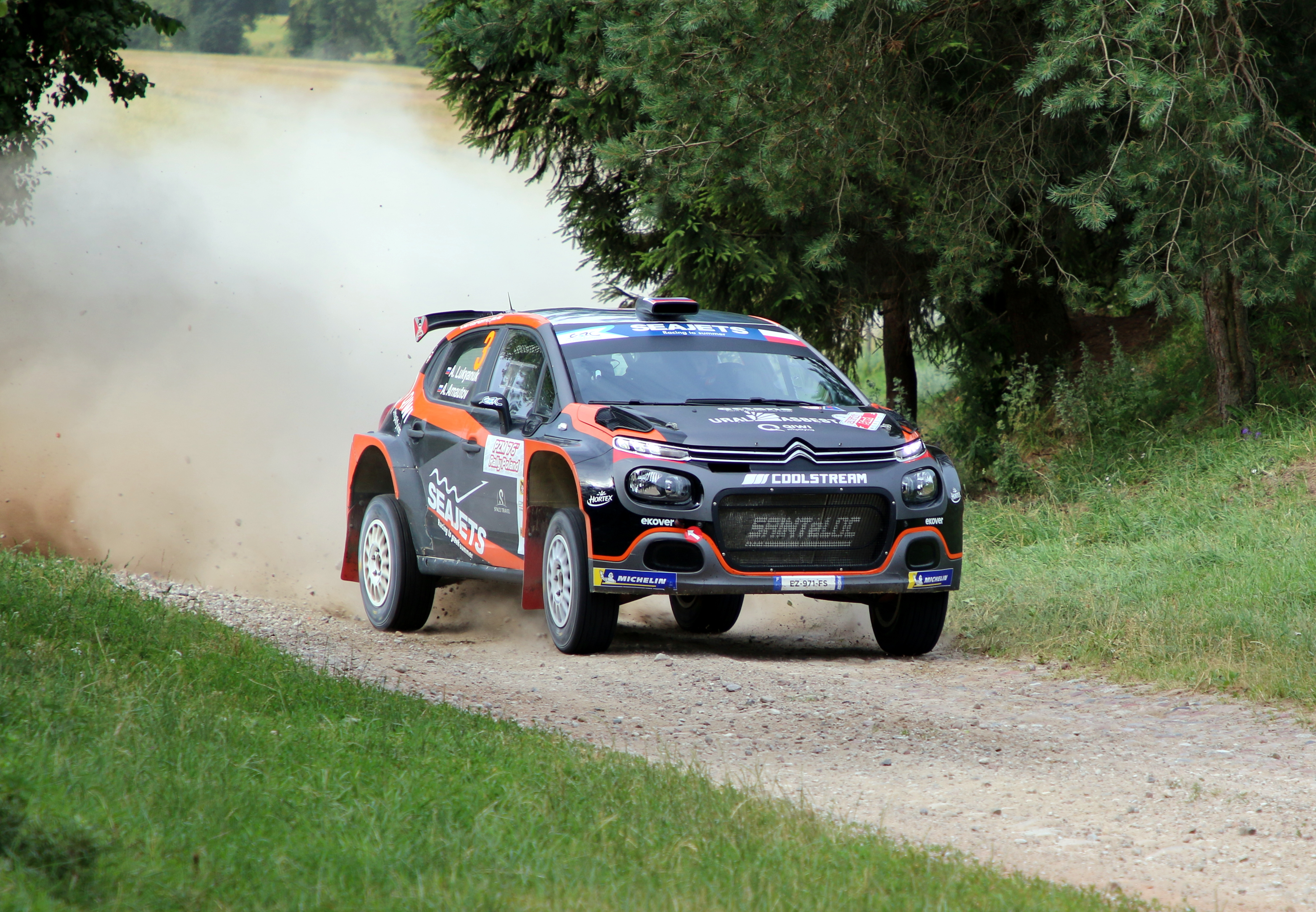
2019 Rally Poland - Alexey Lukyanuk

The 2019 European Rally Championship was the 67th season of the FIA European Rally Championship, the European continental championship series in rallying. The season was also the seventh following the merge between the European Rally Championship and the Intercontinental Rally Challenge. Alexey Lukyanuk was the reigning champion and he returned to defend the title switching from a Ford Fiesta R5 to the Citroën C3 R5. On the final round at Rally Hungary, Chris Ingram became the first British driver in 52 years to win the title in a Skoda Fabia R5.

In 2019 the two European Junior Championship tiers were renamed: ERC Junior U28 became ERC1 Junior and ERC Junior U27 is retitled ERC3 Junior.

== ERC Classes ==
- FIA ERC1: Main class, for FIA-homologated cars with R5 regulations. Best 6 scores from 8 events.
- FIA ERC2: Second tier, for cars more standard, albeit with turbocharged engines and four-wheel drive. This class allows the N4, the R4-K and RGT rules. Best 4 scores from 8 events.
- FIA ERC3: Third ERC tier, the first for front-wheel-drive cars. Allows R3 and R2 cars. Best 6 scores from 8 events.
- FIA ERC1 Junior: For drivers aged 28 and under on 1 January 2019 in R5 cars. The champion receives a prize money to contest the two last rounds of ERC (not part of ERC1 Junior). Best 4 scores from 6 events.
- FIA ERC3 Junior: For drivers aged 27 and under on 1 January 2019 in R2 cars on Pirelli control tyres. The winner will get the chance to drive in two rounds of the 2020 FIA ERC in Škoda Fabia R5. Best 4 scores from 6 events.
- ERC Ladies Trophy: for female drivers including all classes (ERC1, ERC2 and ERC3) eligible. Drivers count their best four scores.
- Abarth Rally Cup: competition with six rounds of the ERC with the rear-wheel-drive Abarth 124 rally.
- FIA European Rally Championship for Teams: each team can nominate a maximum of three cars (from all categories), counting the two highest-placed cars from each team. Counting 6 best scores from 8 events.
- ERC Nations Cup: like the ERC for Teams but for teams supported by a national motorsport federation or automobile association.

== Calendar ==
The calendar for the 2019 season features eight rallies (four rallies on tarmac and four on gravel) like the previous season, albeit in a shaked-up order. The Acropolis Rally was discontinued in its entirety after 2018, and was replaced by a new event in Hungary, Nyíregyháza Rally, which will also be the season finale. The previous season finale, Rally Liepāja, was moved to the third round of the season in May. The Cyprus Rally and Rally Poland were switched to the seventh and fourth rounds, respectively.

Round	Dates	Rally name	Surface	
1	21–23 March	(Portugal) Rallye Açores	Gravel	ERC Junior Round 1
2	2–4 May	(Spain) Rally Islas Canarias	Tarmac	ERC Junior Rd 2, Abarth Cup Rd 1
3	24–26 May	(Latvia) Rally Liepāja	Gravel	ERC Junior Rd 3, Abarth Cup Rd 2
4	28–30 June	Rally Poland	Gravel	ERC Junior Rd 4, Abarth Cup Rd 3
5	19–21 July	(Italy) Rally di Roma Capitale	Tarmac	ERC Junior Rd 5, Abarth Cup Rd 4
6	16–18 August	(Czech Republic) Barum Rally Zlín	Tarmac	ERC Junior Rd 6, Abarth Cup Rd 5
7	27–29 September	Cyprus Rally	Gravel	
8	8–10 November	1st Rally Hungary	Tarmac	Abarth Cup Rd 6

== Teams and drivers ==
=== ERC ===
Entries
Constructor	Car	Entrant	Class	Tyre	Drivers	Co-drivers	Rounds	
Citroën	Citroën C3 R5	(France) Saintéloc Junior Team	R5	MI	(Russia) Alexey Lukyanuk	(Russia) Alexey Arnautov	All	
Citroën	Citroën C3 R5	(France) Saintéloc Junior Team	R5	MI	(United States) Sean Johnston	(United States) Alex Kihurani	8	
Citroën	Citroën C3 R5	Sweden National Team	R5	MI	(Sweden) Mattias Adielsson	(Sweden) Andreas Johansson	1, 3–4	ERC1J
Citroën	Citroën C3 R5	(Portugal) Raly/Auto Açoreana Racing	R5	P	(Portugal) Bernardo Sousa	(Portugal) Victor Calado	1	
Citroën	Citroën C3 R5	(Spain) Citroën Rally Team	R5	P	(Spain) Pepe López	(Spain) Borja Rozada	2	ERC1J
Citroën	Citroën C3 R5	(Spain) Escudería Fuertwagen Motorsport	R5	MI	(Spain) Emma Falcón	(Spain) Eduardo González	2	ERC1J
Citroën	Citroën C3 R5	Rally Team Spain	R5	MI	(Spain) Emma Falcón	(Spain) Eduardo González	5	ERC1J
Citroën	Citroën C3 R5	(Austria) STARD	R5	Y	(Japan) Hiroki Arai	(Austria) Ilka Minor	3–4, 6	ERC1J
Citroën	Citroën C3 R5	(Austria) STARD	R5	Y	(Japan) Hiroki Arai	(Austria) Jürgen Heigl	5	ERC1J
Citroën	Citroën C3 R5	(Poland) BTH Import Stal Rally Team	R5	P	(Poland) Łukasz Kotarba	(Poland) Tomasz Kotarba	4	
Citroën	Citroën C3 R5	(Italy) F.P.F. Sport SRL	R5	P	(Italy) Luca Rossetti	(Italy) Eleonora Mori	5	
Citroën	Citroën C3 R5	Citroën Rally Team Hungary	R5	P	(Hungary) Ádám Velenczei	(Hungary) Gábor Zsiros	8	
Citroën	Citroën DS3 R5	(Cyprus) Psaltis Auto Parts	R5	P	(Cyprus) Andreas Psaltis	(Cyprus) Andreas Chrysostomou	7	
Hyundai	Hyundai i20 R5	Team Hyundai Portugal	R5	MI	(Portugal) Bruno Magalhães	(Portugal) Hugo Magalhães	1	
Hyundai	Hyundai i20 R5	(Spain) Hyundai Motor España	R5	P	(Spain) Iván Ares	(Spain) David Vázquez	2	
Hyundai	Hyundai i20 R5	(Spain) Hyundai Motor España	R5	MI	(Spain) Surhayén Pernía	(Spain) Alba Sánchez	2	
Hyundai	Hyundai i20 R5	(Spain) Hyundai Motor España	R5	MI	(Spain) Francisco López	(Spain) Borja Odriozola	2	
Hyundai	Hyundai i20 R5	Rally Team Spain	R5	MI	(Spain) José Antonio Suárez	(Spain) Alberto Iglesias	2	
Hyundai	Hyundai i20 R5	(Spain) Escudería Fuertwagen Motorsport	R5	MI	(Spain) Yeray Lemes	(Spain) Ariday Bonilla	2	
Hyundai	Hyundai i20 R5	(Germany) Hyundai Motorsport N	R5	P	(Finland) Jari Huttunen	(Finland) Antti Linnaketo	4	
Hyundai	Hyundai i20 R5	(Germany) Hyundai Motorsport N	R5	P	(United Kingdom) Callum Devine	(United Kingdom) Brian Hoy	8	
Hyundai	Hyundai i20 R5	(Germany) Hyundai Motorsport N	R5	MI	(Italy) Umberto Scandola	(Italy) Guido D'Amore	5	
Hyundai	Hyundai i20 R5	(Czech Republic) Hyundai Kowax Racing	R5	P	(Poland) Kacper Wróblewski	(Poland) Marcin Szeja	4	
Hyundai	Hyundai i20 R5	(Czech Republic) Hyundai Kowax Racing	R5	MI	(Czech Republic) Martin Vlček	(Czech Republic) Ondřej Krajča	6	
Hyundai	Hyundai i20 R5	(Czech Republic) Hyundai Kowax Racing	R5	MI	(Czech Republic) Petr Trnovec	(Czech Republic) Miroslav Staněk	6	
Hyundai	Hyundai i20 R5	(Poland) Rally Technology	R5	P	(Poland) Daniel Chwist	(Poland) Kamil Heller	4	
Hyundai	Hyundai i20 R5	(Finland) Printsport	R5	MI	(Sweden) Lars Stugemo	(Sweden) Kalle Lexe	5	
Hyundai	Hyundai i20 R5	(Cyprus) Yiangou Motorsport Ltd	R5	P	(Cyprus) Panayiotis Yiangou	(Cyprus) Panayiotis Kyriakou	7	
Škoda	Škoda Fabia R5	(Germany) Toksport World Rally Team	R5	MI	(United Kingdom) Chris Ingram	(United Kingdom) Ross Whittock	1–7	ERC1J
Škoda	Škoda Fabia R5	(Germany) Toksport World Rally Team	R5	MI	(Cyprus) Alex Tsouloftas	(Cyprus) Antonis Chrysostomou	1–3	ERC1J
Škoda	Škoda Fabia R5	(Germany) Toksport World Rally Team	R5	P	(Norway) Eyvind Brynildsen	(Norway) Cato Menkerud	3	
Škoda	Škoda Fabia R5	(Germany) Toksport World Rally Team	R5	MI	(Saudi Arabia) Rakan Al-Rashed	(Portugal) Hugo Magalhães	7	
Škoda	Škoda Fabia R5	(Finland) Printsport	R5	MI	(Saudi Arabia) Rakan Al-Rashed	(Portugal) Hugo Magalhães	3	
Škoda	Škoda Fabia R5	(Latvia) Sports Racing Technologies	R5	P	(Poland) Łukasz Habaj	(Poland) Daniel Dymurski	All	
Škoda	Škoda Fabia R5	(Latvia) Sports Racing Technologies	R5	MI	(Russia) Nikolay Gryazin	(Russia) Yaroslav Fedorov	5–6	ERC1J
Škoda	Škoda Fabia R5	(Portugal) ARC Sport	R5	MI	(Portugal) Ricardo Moura	(Portugal) António Costa	1	
Škoda	Škoda Fabia R5	(Portugal) ARC Sport	R5	MI	(Portugal) Ricardo Teodósio	(Portugal) José Teixeira	1	
Škoda	Škoda Fabia R5	(Portugal) ARC Sport	R5	MI	(Portugal) Luís Rego	(Portugal) Jorge Henriques	1	
Škoda	Škoda Fabia R5	(Portugal) ARC Sport	R5	MI	(Portugal) Pedro Almeida	(Portugal) Nuno Almeida	1	ERC1J
Škoda	Škoda Fabia R5	(Czech Republic) ACCR Czech Rally Team I	R5	P	(Czech Republic) Vojtěch Štajf	(Czech Republic) Veronika Havelková	1–2	
Škoda	Škoda Fabia R5	(Czech Republic) ACCR Czech Rally Team I	R5	MI	(Czech Republic) Filip Mareš	(Czech Republic) Jan Hloušek	3–6	ERC1J
Škoda	Škoda Fabia R5	(France) 2C Competition	R5	MI	(France) Pierre-Louis Loubet	(France) Vincent Landais	1–2	ERC1J
Škoda	Škoda Fabia R5	(Brazil) Palmeirinha Rally	R5	P	(Brazil) Paulo Nobre	(Brazil) Gabriel Morales	All	
Škoda	Škoda Fabia R5	(Portugal) BP Ultimate Vodafone Škoda Team	R5	P	(Portugal) Miguel Barbosa	(Portugal) Jorge Carvalho	1	
Škoda	Škoda Fabia R5	FPAK Portugal Team ERC	R5	MI	(Portugal) Aloísio Monteiro	(Portugal) Sancho Eiró	1, 4–5	
Škoda	Škoda Fabia R5	(Austria) BRR Baumschlager Rally & Racing Team	R5	MI	(Germany) Marijan Griebel	(Germany) Stefan Kopczyk	2–3	
Škoda	Škoda Fabia R5	(Austria) BRR Baumschlager Rally & Racing Team	R5	MI	(Germany) Marijan Griebel	(Germany) Pirmin Winklhofer	4, 6	
Škoda	Škoda Fabia R5	(Austria) BRR Baumschlager Rally & Racing Team	R5	P	(Germany) Albert von Thurn und Taxis	(Austria) Bernhard Ettel	2, 5	
Škoda	Škoda Fabia R5	(Spain) ACSM Rallye Team	R5	MI	(Spain) Xavier Pons	(Spain) Rodrigo Sanjuan	2	
Škoda	Škoda Fabia R5	(Hungary) Érdi Team Kft.	R5	P	(Hungary) Tibor Érdi	(Hungary) Szabolcs Kovács	2–3, 5, 7–8	
Škoda	Škoda Fabia R5	(Lithuania) Agrorodeo	R5	P	(Lithuania) Vaidotas Žala	(Latvia) Andris Mālnieks	3–4	
Škoda	Škoda Fabia R5	(Lithuania) Agrorodeo	R5	MI	(Czech Republic) Jaromír Tarabus	(Czech Republic) Daniel Trunkát	6	
Škoda	Škoda Fabia R5	(Latvia) LMT Autosporta Akadēmija	R5	P	(Latvia) Mārtiņš Sesks	(Latvia) Krišjānis Caune	3	ERC1J
Škoda	Škoda Fabia R5	(Latvia) LMT Autosporta Akadēmija	R5	P	(Latvia) Mārtiņš Sesks	(Latvia) Uldis Briedis	5	ERC1J
Škoda	Škoda Fabia R5	(Poland) Škoda Polska Motorsport	R5	MI	(Poland) Miko Marczyk	(Poland) Szymon Gospodarczyk	4, 6	ERC1J
Škoda	Škoda Fabia R5	(Lithuania) Pro Racing	R5	P	(Lithuania) Vytautas Švedas	(Lithuania) Žilvinas Sakalauskas	4	
Škoda	Škoda Fabia R5	(Finland) TGS Worldwide	R5	P	(Poland) Aron Domżała	(Poland) Jarosław Baran	4	
Škoda	Škoda Fabia R5	(Italy) Loran SRL	R5	MI	(Italy) Giandomenico Basso	(Italy) Lorenzo Granai	5	
Škoda	Škoda Fabia R5	(Italy) Gass Racing srl	R5	P	(Italy) Andrea Crugnola	(Italy) Pietro Ometto	5	
Škoda	Škoda Fabia R5	(Czech Republic) Mogul Auto Šídlo Škoda Team	R5	MI	(Czech Republic) Jan Černý	(Czech Republic) Petr Černohorský	6	
Škoda	Škoda Fabia R5	(Czech Republic) Samohýl Škoda Team	R5	HK	(Czech Republic) Miroslav Jakeš	(Czech Republic) Petr Machů	6	
Škoda	Škoda Fabia R5	(Czech Republic) Samohýl Škoda Team	R5	HK	(Czech Republic) Martin Březík	(Czech Republic) Marek Omelka	6	
Škoda	Škoda Fabia R5	(Czech Republic) SK DER Rally Team	R5	P	(Czech Republic) Roman Odložilík	(Czech Republic) Martin Tureček	6	
Škoda	Škoda Fabia R5	(Poland) BTH Import Stal Rally Team	R5	MI	(Czech Republic) Tomáš Pospíšilík	(Czech Republic) Jiří Hovorka	6	ERC1J
Škoda	Škoda Fabia R5	(Poland) Rally Technology	R5	P	(Czech Republic) Antonín Tlusťák	(Czech Republic) Ivo Vybíral	6	
Škoda	Škoda Fabia R5	(Cyprus) Petrolina Racing Team	R5	MI	(Cyprus) Simos Galatariotis	(Cyprus) Antonis Ioannou	7	
Škoda	Škoda Fabia R5	(Spain) MC Racing	R5	P	(Qatar) Abdulaziz Al-Kuwari	(United Kingdom) Marshall Clarke	7	
Škoda	Škoda Fabia R5	(Hungary) Korda Racing Team	R5	P	(Hungary) Firenc Vincze	(Slovakia) Igor Bacigál	8	
Škoda	Škoda Fabia R5	(Hungary) Turán Motorsport SE	R5	HK	(Hungary) Frigyes Turán	(Hungary) László Bagaméri	8	
Škoda	Škoda Fabia R5	(Hungary) LPWM Sport Kft	R5	P	(Hungary) Pál Lovász	(Hungary) Tamás Kürti	8	
Škoda	Škoda Fabia R5	(Hungary) TBR Racing	R5	P	(Hungary) Róbert Bútor	(Hungary) Róbert Tagai	8	
Škoda	Škoda Fabia R5	(Hungary) Extrém Sport Team Kft.	R5	P	(Hungary) József Trencsényi	(Hungary) Gábor Verba	8	
Škoda	Škoda Fabia R5	(Germany) Speedlife Motorsport	R5	MI	(Germany) Maximilian Koch	(Germany) Lisa Brunthaler	8	
Škoda	Škoda Fabia R5 Evo	(Czech Republic) Škoda Motorsport	R5	MI	(Czech Republic) Jan Kopecký	(Czech Republic) Pavel Dresler	6	
Škoda	Škoda Fabia R5 Evo	(Czech Republic) Kresta Racing s.r.o.	R5	MI	(Czech Republic) Tomáš Kostka	(Czech Republic) Ladislav Kučera	6	
Škoda	Škoda Fabia R5 Evo	(Poland) Rally Technology	R5	MI	(Austria) Simon Wagner	(Austria) Gerald Winter	6	ERC1J
Škoda	Škoda Fabia R5 Evo	(Austria) BRR Baumschlager Rally & Racing Team	R5	P	(Germany) Albert von Thurn und Taxis	(Austria) Bernhard Ettel	6–8	
Škoda	Škoda Fabia R5 Evo	FPAK Portugal Team ERC	R5	MI	(Portugal) Aloísio Monteiro	(Portugal) Sancho Eiró	6	
Škoda	Škoda Fabia R5 Evo	(Germany) Toksport World Rally Team	R5	MI	(Chile) Emilio Fernández	(Spain) Axel Coronado	7	
Škoda	Škoda Fabia R5 Evo	(Germany) Toksport World Rally Team	R5	MI	(United Kingdom) Chris Ingram	(United Kingdom) Ross Whittock	8	ERC1J
Škoda	Škoda Fabia R5 Evo	(Czech Republic) ACCR Czech Rally Team I	R5	MI	(Czech Republic) Filip Mareš	(Czech Republic) Jan Hloušek	8	ERC1J
Škoda	Škoda Fabia R5 Evo	(Poland) Rally Technology	R5	MI	(Hungary) János Puskádi	(Hungary) Barnabás Góbor	8	
Volkswagen	Volkswagen Polo GTI R5	(Austria) BRR Baumschlager Rally & Racing Team	R5	MI	(Germany) Marijan Griebel	(Germany) Stefan Kopczyk	1	
Volkswagen	Volkswagen Polo GTI R5	(Austria) BRR Baumschlager Rally & Racing Team	R5	P	(Germany) Albert von Thurn und Taxis	(Austria) Bernhard Ettel	3–4	
Volkswagen	Volkswagen Polo GTI R5	(Hungary) Mol Racing Team	R5	MI	(Hungary) Norbert Herczig	(Hungary) Ramón Ferencz	All	
Volkswagen	Volkswagen Polo GTI R5	(Finland) Printsport	R5	MI	(Sweden) Lars Stugemo	(Sweden) Kalle Lexe	2	
Volkswagen	Volkswagen Polo GTI R5	(Finland) Printsport	R5	MI	(Poland) Szymon Ruta	(Poland) Bartłomiej Boba	4	
Volkswagen	Volkswagen Polo GTI R5	(Latvia) Sport Racing Technologies	R5	P	(Norway) Oliver Solberg	(United Kingdom) Aaron Johnston	3	ERC1J
Volkswagen	Volkswagen Polo GTI R5	(Czech Republic) ACCR Czech Rally Team II	R5	P	(Czech Republic) Vojtěch Štajf	(Czech Republic) Veronika Havelková	5–6	
Volkswagen	Volkswagen Polo GTI R5	(United Kingdom) Autotek Motorsport	R5	MI	(Qatar) Nasser Al-Attiyah	(France) Matthieu Baumel	7	
Ford	Ford Fiesta R5	(Portugal) ARC Sport	R5	MI	(Portugal) Miguel Correia	(Portugal) Pedro Alves	1	ERC1J
Ford	Ford Fiesta R5	(Spain) Auto Laca Competición	R5	P	(Spain) Luis Monzón	(Spain) José Carlos Déniz	2	
Ford	Ford Fiesta R5	(Austria) Drift Company Rally Team	R5	P	(Austria) Niki Mayr-Melnhof	(Austria) Leopold Welsersheimb	2, 5, 7–8	
Ford	Ford Fiesta R5	(Russia) MR Motorsport	R5	P	(Russia) Artur Muradian	(Russia) Pavel Chelebaev	3	
Ford	Ford Fiesta R5	(Poland) Tiger Energy Drink Rally Team	R5	P	(Poland) Tomasz Kasperczyk	(Poland) Damian Syty	4	
Ford	Ford Fiesta R5	(Poland) Rally Technology	R5	P	(Poland) Marcin Słobodzian	(Poland) Kamil Kozdroń	4	
Ford	Ford Fiesta R5	(Poland) C-Rally	R5	P	(Poland) Jarosłw Kołtun	(Poland) Ireneusz Pleskot	4	
Ford	Ford Fiesta R5	(Czech Republic) EuroOil Invelt Team	R5	P	(Czech Republic) Václav Pech	(Czech Republic) Petr Uhel	6	
Ford	Ford Fiesta R5	Sweden National Team	R5	P	(Sweden) Mattias Adielsson	(Sweden) Andreas Johansson	6	ERC1J
Ford	Ford Fiesta R5	(Estonia) MM Motorsport	R5	MR	(Finland) Mikko Hirvonen	(Finland) Jarno Ottman	7	
Ford	Ford Fiesta R5	(Czech Republic) ACCR Czech Rally Team I	R5	P	(Czech Republic) Tomáš Kurka	(Czech Republic) Kateřina Janovská	7	
Ford	Ford Fiesta R5	Ford Hungary Rally Team Kft.	R5	P	(Hungary) László Bodolai	(Hungary) Tamás Szőke	8	
Ford	Ford Fiesta R5	(Hungary) Speedbox Racing Team Kft.	R5	P	(Hungary) László Kiss	(Hungary) Annamária Budai	8	
Ford	Ford Fiesta R5	(Hungary) Klaus Motorsport	R5	P	(Hungary) Kristóf Klausz	(Hungary) Botond Csányi	8	
Ford	Ford Fiesta R5 Mk. II	(United Kingdom) Orange 1 M-Sport Rally Team	R5	P	(Italy) Simone Campedelli	(Switzerland) Tania Canton	5	
Ford	Ford Fiesta R5 Mk. II	(Hungary) Hadik Rally Team	R5	P	(Hungary) András Hadik	(Hungary) Atilla Deák	8	
Peugeot	Peugeot 208 T16 R5	(Belgium) Joachim Wagemans Rally Team	R5	MI	(Belgium) Joachim Wagemans	(Belgium) François Geerlandt	8	

=== ERC-2 ===
Entries
Constructor	Car	Entrant	Class	Tyre	Drivers	Co-drivers	Rounds	
Mitsubishi	Mitsubishi Lancer Evo X	(Russia) Russian Performance Motorsport	N	P	(Russia) Sergey Remennik	(Russia) Marina Danilova	1	
Mitsubishi	Mitsubishi Lancer Evo X	(Russia) Russian Performance Motorsport	N	P	(Russia) Sergey Remennik	(Russia) Mark Rozin	2–3	
Mitsubishi	Mitsubishi Lancer Evo X	(Lithuania) Pro Racing	N	DM	(Argentina) Juan Carlos Alonso	(Argentina) Juan Pablo Monasterolo	1	
Mitsubishi	Mitsubishi Lancer Evo X	(Lithuania) Pro Racing	N	MI	(Argentina) Juan Carlos Alonso	(Argentina) Juan Pablo Monasterolo	2	
Mitsubishi	Mitsubishi Lancer Evo X	(Lithuania) Pro Racing	N	P	(Argentina) Juan Carlos Alonso	(Argentina) Juan Pablo Monasterolo	4, 6–7	
Mitsubishi	Mitsubishi Lancer Evo X	(Latvia) Neikšāns Rallysport	N	P	(Italy) Zelindo Melegari	(Italy) Corrado Bonato	2–4	
Mitsubishi	Mitsubishi Lancer Evo X	(Latvia) Sporta Klubs Autostils Rally Team	N	P	(Latvia) Ralfs Sirmacis	(Latvia) Ralfs Igaveņš	3	
Mitsubishi	Mitsubishi Lancer Evo X	(Latvia) Sporta Klubs Autostils Rally Team	N	P	(Russia) Dmitry Feofanov	(Russia) Dmitry Chumak	3–4	
Mitsubishi	Mitsubishi Lancer Evo X	(Latvia) Sporta Klubs Autostils Rally Team	N	P	(Russia) Dmitry Feofanov	(Latvia) Normunds Kokins	7	
Mitsubishi	Mitsubishi Lancer Evo X	(Estonia) ALM Motorsport	N	P	(Kuwait) Meshari Al-Thefiri	(Qatar) Nasser Al-Kuwari	3–7	
Mitsubishi	Mitsubishi Lancer Evo X	(Hungary) Horváth Rally ASE	N	MI	(Hungary) Mátyás Nagy	(Hungary) Tamás Nagy	6, 8	
Mitsubishi	Mitsubishi Lancer Evo X	(Cyprus) Q8 Oils Rally Team	N	P	(Cyprus) Petros Pantelli	(Cyprus) Kypros Christodoulou	7	
Mitsubishi	Mitsubishi Lancer Evo X	(Cyprus) Psaltis Auto Parts	N	P	(Cyprus) Antonis Chilimindris	(Cyprus) Stelios Elia	7	
Mitsubishi	Mitsubishi Lancer Evo IX	(Lithuania) Pro Racing	N	P	(Lithuania) Vytautas Švedas	(Lithuania) Žilvinas Sakalauskas	3	
Mitsubishi	Mitsubishi Lancer Evo IX	(Cyprus) SLT Rally Team	N	P	(Cyprus) Louis Papageorgiou	(Cyprus) Avraam Nicolaou	7	
Subaru	Subaru Impreza WRX STI	(Portugal) P&B Racing	N	P	(Portugal) Luís Pimentel	(Portugal) Nuno Moura	1	
Abarth	Fiat Abarth 124 Rally RGT	(Poland) Rally Technology	RGT	P	(Poland) Dariusz Poloński	(Poland) Łukasz Sitek	2–6, 8	A Cup
Abarth	Fiat Abarth 124 Rally RGT	Abarth Spain	RGT	P	(Spain) Alberto Monarri	(Spain) Alberto Chamorro	2	A Cup
Abarth	Fiat Abarth 124 Rally RGT	(Italy) Loran SRL	RGT	P	(Italy) Andrea Nucita	(Italy) Giuseppe Princiotto	2	A Cup
Abarth	Fiat Abarth 124 Rally RGT	(Italy) Loran SRL	RGT	P	(Italy) Andrea Nucita	(Romania) Alina Pop	3–5	A Cup
Abarth	Fiat Abarth 124 Rally RGT	(Italy) Loran SRL	RGT	P	(Italy) Andrea Nucita	(Italy) Bernardo Di Caro	6, 8	A Cup
Abarth	Fiat Abarth 124 Rally RGT	(Spain) Overcame Competitión	RGT	P	(Spain) Carlos David García	(Spain) Jordi Díaz	2	A Cup
Abarth	Fiat Abarth 124 Rally RGT	(Latvia) reinisnitiss.com	RGT	P	(Latvia) Reinis Nitišs	(Latvia) Māris Kulšs	3	A Cup
Abarth	Fiat Abarth 124 Rally RGT	(Italy) Movisport	RGT	P	(Italy) Zelindo Melegari	(Italy) Corrado Bonato	5–6	A Cup

=== ERC-3 ===
Entries
Constructor	Car	Entrant	Class	Tyre	Drivers	Co-drivers	Rounds	
Peugeot	Peugeot 208 R2	Rally Team Spain	R2	P	(Spain) Efrén Llarena	(Spain) Sara Fernández	1–6	ERC3J
Peugeot	Peugeot 208 R2	(France) Peugeot Rally Academy	R2	MI	(Spain) Efrén Llarena	(Spain) Sara Fernández	7	ERC3J
Peugeot	Peugeot 208 R2	(France) Peugeot Rally Academy	R2	MI	(United Kingdom) Catie Munnings	(Norway) Veronica Engan	1–3, 5–6	
Peugeot	Peugeot 208 R2	(France) Peugeot Rally Academy	R2	MI	(France) Yohan Rossel	(France) Benoît Fulcrand	1–3, 6	
Peugeot	Peugeot 208 R2	(Austria) Stengg Motorsport	R2	P	(Czech Republic) Dominik Brož	(Czech Republic) Petr Téšínský	4	ERC3J
Peugeot	Peugeot 208 R2	(Czech Republic) ACCR Czech Rally Team II	R2	P	(Czech Republic) Dominik Brož	(Czech Republic) Petr Téšínský	1, 3	ERC3J
Peugeot	Peugeot 208 R2	(Czech Republic) ACCR Czech Rally Team II	R2	P	(Czech Republic) René Dohnal	(Czech Republic) Roman Švec	6	
Peugeot	Peugeot 208 R2	(Czech Republic) ACCR Czech Rally Team I	R2	P	(Czech Republic) Jan Talaš	(Czech Republic) Ondřej Krajča	1–2, 4–5	ERC3J
Peugeot	Peugeot 208 R2	(Czech Republic) ACCR Czech Rally Team I	R2	P	(Czech Republic) Jan Talaš	(Czech Republic) Tomáš Šmíd	6	ERC3J
Peugeot	Peugeot 208 R2	(Czech Republic) ACCR Czech Rally Team I	R2	P	(Czech Republic) Petr Semerád	(Czech Republic) Jiří Hlávka	2–4	ERC3J
Peugeot	Peugeot 208 R2	FPAK Portugal Team ERC	R2	P	(Portugal) Pedro Antunes	(Portugal) Paulo Lopes	1–2, 4–6	ERC3J
Peugeot	Peugeot 208 R2	(France) Saintéloc Junior Team	R2	P	(Norway) Sindre Furuseth	(Sweden) Jim Hjerpe	1–6	ERC3J
Peugeot	Peugeot 208 R2	(France) Saintéloc Junior Team	R2	MI	(United States) Sean Johnston	(United States) Alex Kihurani	1–4, 6	
Peugeot	Peugeot 208 R2	(France) Saintéloc Junior Team	R2	P	(Sweden) Adam Westlund	(Sweden) Joakim Sjöberg	4	ERC3J
Peugeot	Peugeot 208 R2	(France) Saintéloc Junior Team	R2	MI	(Bulgaria) Ekaterina Stratieva	(Bulgaria) Georgi Avramov	7–8	
Peugeot	Peugeot 208 R2	(Germany) Team Romo	R2	P	(Germany) Roman Schwedt	(Germany) Lina Meter	1–4	ERC3J
Peugeot	Peugeot 208 R2	(Germany) Team Romo	R2	P	(Germany) Roman Schwedt	(Germany) Henry Wichura	5	ERC3J
Peugeot	Peugeot 208 R2	(Russia) TB Racing	R2	P	(Russia) Dmitry Myachin	(Russia) Alexander Gorlanov	1	
Peugeot	Peugeot 208 R2	(Hungary) Klaus Motorsport Kft	R2	P	(Hungary) Kristóf Klausz	(Hungary) Ágnes Farnadi	2–3	ERC3J
Peugeot	Peugeot 208 R2	(Hungary) Klaus Motorsport Kft	R2	P	(Hungary) Kristóf Klausz	(Hungary) Botond Csányi	6	ERC3J
Peugeot	Peugeot 208 R2	(Spain) Mavisa Sport	R2	P	(Finland) Miika Hokkanen	(Finland) Rami Suorsa	2–4	ERC3J
Peugeot	Peugeot 208 R2	(Bulgaria) Grigorov Rally Team	R2	P	(Bulgaria) Grigor Grigorov	(Bulgaria) Yanaki Yanakiev	2, 6	ERC3J
Peugeot	Peugeot 208 R2	(Portugal) PT Racing	R2	P	(United Kingdom) Nabila Tejpar	(United Kingdom) Max Freeman	2	ERC3J
Peugeot	Peugeot 208 R2	(United Kingdom) Allied Polymer	R2	P	(United Kingdom) Nabila Tejpar	(United Kingdom) Max Freeman	4	ERC3J
Peugeot	Peugeot 208 R2	(United Kingdom) Allied Polymer	R2	P	(United Kingdom) Nabila Tejpar	(Portugal) Hugo Magalhães	6, 8	ERC3J
Peugeot	Peugeot 208 R2	(Norway) Steve Røkland Motorsport	R2	P	(Norway) Steve Røkland	(Norway) Marius Fuglerud	3–4	ERC3J
Peugeot	Peugeot 208 R2	(Germany) Toksport World Rally Team	R2	MI	(Turkey) Orhan Avcioğlu	(Turkey) Burçin Korkmaz	7–8	
Peugeot	Peugeot 208 R2	(Germany) Toksport World Rally Team	R2	P	(Turkey) Orhan Avcioğlu	(Turkey) Burçin Korkmaz	6	
Peugeot	Peugeot 208 R2	(Germany) Toksport World Rally Team	R2	P	(Turkey) Orhan Avcioğlu	(Turkey) Aras Dinçer	5	
Peugeot	Peugeot 208 R2	(Germany) Toksport World Rally Team	R2	P	(Belgium) Amaury Molle	(France) Florian Barral	6	ERC3J
Peugeot	Peugeot 208 R2	(Germany) Toksport World Rally Team	R2	MI	(Germany) Marijan Griebel	(Germany) Alexander Rath	8	
Peugeot	Peugeot 208 R2	(Romania) H Motorsport	R2	MI	(Romania) Cristiana Oprea	(Romania) Diana Hațegan	5	
Peugeot	Peugeot 208 R2	(Czech Republic) Samohýl Motor	R2	P	(Czech Republic) Adam Březík	(Czech Republic) Zdeněk Bělák	6	
Peugeot	Peugeot 208 R2	(Czech Republic) Spies Hecker - autolaky	R2	MI	(Czech Republic) Jiří Navrátil	(Czech Republic) Michal Večerka	6	
Peugeot	Peugeot 208 R2	(Hungary) East Motorsport Kft.	R2	P	(Hungary) Miklós Csomós	(Hungary) Attila Nagy	6, 8	
Peugeot	Peugeot 208 R2	(Hungary) Bakó Rally Team	R2	MI	(Romania) Eugen Caragui	(Romania) Robert Fus	8	
Opel	Opel Adam R2	(Austria) Stengg Motorsport	R2	P	(Austria) Simon Wagner	(Austria) Gerald Winter	1–2	ERC3J
Opel	Opel Adam R2	(Austria) Stengg Motorsport	R2	P	(Austria) Roland Stengg	(Germany) Alessandra Baumann	1–3	ERC3J
Opel	Opel Adam R2	(Germany) ADAC Opel Rallye Junior Team	R2	P	(Luxembourg) Grégoire Munster	(Belgium) Louis Louka	1–6	ERC3J
Opel	Opel Adam R2	(Germany) ADAC Opel Rallye Junior Team	R2	P	(Sweden) Elias Lundberg	(Sweden) David Arhusiander	1–6	ERC3J
Opel	Opel Adam R2	(Poland) Go+Cars Go+EAuto	R2	P	(Czech Republic) Petr Semerád	(Czech Republic) Jiří Hlávka	6	ERCJ
Ford	Ford Fiesta R2T	(United Kingdom) M-Sport Ford World Rally Team	R2	P	(Norway) Steve Røkland	(Norway) Marius Fuglerud	1	ERC3J
Ford	Ford Fiesta R2T	(United Kingdom) M-Sport Ford World Rally Team	R2	P	(France) Jean-Baptiste Franceschi	(France) Anthony Gorguilo	2	ERC3J
Ford	Ford Fiesta R2T	(United Kingdom) M-Sport Ford World Rally Team	R2	P	(France) Jean-Baptiste Franceschi	(France) Jacques-Julien Renucci	3, 6	ERC3J
Ford	Ford Fiesta R2T	(United Kingdom) M-Sport Ford World Rally Team	R2	P	(United Kingdom) James Williams	(United Kingdom) Tom Woodburn	5	ERC3J
Ford	Ford Fiesta R2T	(Czech Republic) ACCR Czech Rally Team I	R2	P	(Czech Republic) Erik Cais	(Czech Republic) Jindřiška Žáková	1, 3–8	ERC3J
Ford	Ford Fiesta R2T	FPAK Portugal Team ERC	R2	P	(Portugal) Pedro Antunes	(Portugal) Paulo Lopes	3	ERC3J
Ford	Ford Fiesta R2T	(Estonia) Estonian Autosport Junior Team	R2	P	(Estonia) Ken Torn	(Estonia) Kauri Pannas	3–6	ERC3J
Ford	Ford Fiesta R2T	(Estonia) Estonian Autosport Junior Team	R2	P	(Estonia) Gregor Jeets	(Estonia) Kuldar Sikk	3–6	ERC3J
Ford	Ford Fiesta R2	(Cyprus) Q8 Oils Rally Team	R2	P	(Cyprus) Konstantinos Televantos	(Cyprus) Takis Stavrou	7	
Renault	Renault Clio RS R3T	(France) Fred Anne Compétition	R3	MI	(France) Florian Bernardi	(France) Victor Vellotto	2, 4–7	
Citroën	Citroën DS3 R3T	(Poland) Go+Cars Go+EAuto	R3	P	(Poland) Tomasz Zbroja	(Poland) Jakub Wróbel	4	
Citroën	Citroën DS3 R3T	(Cyprus) Mannouris Rally Team	R3	P	(Cyprus) Christos Mannouris	(Cyprus) Andreas Mannouris	7	

=== Ladies Trophy ===
Entries
Constructor	Car	Entrant	Class	Tyre	Drivers	Co-drivers	Rounds
Citroën	Citroën C3 R5	(Spain) Escudería Fuertwagen Motorsport	R5	MI	(Spain) Emma Falcón	(Spain) Eduardo González	2
Citroën	Citroën C3 R5	Rally Team Spain	R5	MI	(Spain) Emma Falcón	(Spain) Eduardo González	5
Peugeot	Peugeot 208 R2	(France) Peugeot Rally Academy	R2	MI	(United Kingdom) Catie Munnings	(Norway) Veronica Engan	1–3, 5–6
Peugeot	Peugeot 208 R2	(Portugal) PT Racing	R2	P	(United Kingdom) Nabila Tejpar	(United Kingdom) Max Freeman	2
Peugeot	Peugeot 208 R2	(United Kingdom) Allied Polymer	R2	P	(United Kingdom) Nabila Tejpar	(United Kingdom) Max Freeman	4
Peugeot	Peugeot 208 R2	(United Kingdom) Allied Polymer	R2	P	(United Kingdom) Nabila Tejpar	(Portugal) Hugo Magalhães	6, 8
Peugeot	Peugeot 208 R2	(Romania) H Motorsport	R2	MI	(Romania) Cristiana Oprea	(Romania) Diana Hațegan	5
Peugeot	Peugeot 208 R2	(Romania) H Motorsport	R2	P	(Bulgaria) Ekaterina Stratieva	(Bulgaria) Georgi Avramov	6
Peugeot	Peugeot 208 R2	(France) Saintéloc Junior Team	R2	MI	(Bulgaria) Ekaterina Stratieva	(Bulgaria) Georgi Avramov	7–8
Ford	Ford Fiesta R2T	(Hungary) Rally Café Racing Kft.	R2	P	(Hungary) Adrienn Vogel	(Hungary) Ivett Notheisz	8
Ford	Ford Fiesta R1T	(Hungary) Rally Café Racing Kft.	R1	P	(Hungary) Petra Krajnyák	(Hungary) Eszter Velezdi	8

== Results ==
Round	Event	Winning driver	Winning co-driver	Winning entrant	Winning time	Results
1	(Portugal) 54th Azores Rallye	(Poland) Łukasz Habaj	(Poland) Daniel Dymurski	(Latvia) Sports Racing Technologies	2:50:55.4	Results
2	(Spain) 43rd Rally Islas Canarias	(Spain) Pepe López	(Spain) Borja Rozada	(Spain) Citroën Rally Team	2:06:23.9	Results
3	(Latvia) Rally Liepāja	(Norway) Oliver Solberg	(United Kingdom) Aaron Johnston	(Latvia) Sports Racing Technologies	1:40:31.9	Results
4	(Poland) 76th PZM Rajd Polski	(Russia) Alexey Lukyanuk	(Russia) Alexey Arnautov	(France) Saintéloc Junior Team	1:45:49.4	Results
5	(Italy) 7th Rally di Roma Capitale	(Italy) Giandomenico Basso	(Italy) Lorenzo Granai	(Italy) Loran SRL	1:57:32.0	Results
6	(Czech Republic) 49th Barum Czech Rally Zlín	(Czech Republic) Jan Kopecký	(Czech Republic) Pavel Dresler	(Czech Republic) Škoda Motorsport	2:05:17.4	Results
7	48th Cyprus Rally	(Qatar) Nasser Al-Attiyah	(France) Matthieu Baumel	(United Kingdom) Autotek Motorsport	3:02:51.3	Results
8	Rally Hungary	(Hungary) Frigyes Turán	(Hungary) László Bagaméri	(Hungary) Turán Motorsport SE	2:11:28.0	Results

== Championship standings ==
=== Points Systems ===
- For both the Drivers' championships of the ERC, ERC-3, Teams' championship and Nations Cup only the best six results will be retained by each driver/team.
- For the ERC-2, ERC1 Junior, the ERC3 Junior the Ladies Trophy, only the best four results will be retained by each driver.
- Points for final position are awarded as in following table:

Position	1st	2nd	3rd	4th	5th	6th	7th	8th	9th	10th
Points	25	18	15	12	10	8	6	4	2	1

- Bonus points awarded for position in each Leg

Position	1st	2nd	3rd	4th	5th	6th	7th
Points	7	6	5	4	3	2	1

=== Drivers' Championships ===
==== ERC ====
Pos	Driver	AZO (Portugal)	CAN (Spain)	LIE (Latvia)	POL (Poland)	RMC (Italy)	ZLÍ (Czech Republic)	CYP (Cyprus)	HUN (Hungary)	Points	Best 6
1	(United Kingdom) Chris Ingram	3^{15+6}	2^{18+11}	4^{12+8}	Ret	6^{8+4}	3^{15+11}	2^{18+9}	4^{12+6}	153	141
2	(Russia) Alexey Lukyanuk	Ret^{0+7}	Ret^{0+7}	2^{18+12}	1^{25+14}	4^{12+9}	15^{0+3}	Ret	2^{18+10}	135	132
3	(Poland) Łukasz Habaj	1^{25+10}	3^{15+8}	5^{10+3}	3^{15+8}	16^{0+4}	Ret	4^{12+6}	Ret	116	116
4	(Czech Republic) Filip Mareš			6^{8+2}	4^{12+9}	5^{10+5}	2^{18+11}		Ret	75	75
5	(Hungary) Norbert Herczig	Ret	4^{12+5}	13	8^{4+1}	7^{6+4}	Ret	9^{2}	5^{10+8}	52	52
6	(Norway) Oliver Solberg			1^{25+14}						39	39
7	(Czech Republic) Jan Kopecký						1^{25+14}			39	39
8	(Qatar) Nasser Al-Attiyah							1^{25+14}		39	39
9	(Germany) Marijan Griebel	6^{8+4}	9^{2+4}	7^{6+2}	Ret		5^{10+2}		11	38	38
10	(Spain) Pepe López		1^{25+10}							35	35
11	(Italy) Giandomenico Basso					1^{25+10}				35	35
12	(Hungary) Frigyes Turán								1^{25+10}	35	35
13	(Finland) Jari Huttunen				2^{18+12}					30	30
14	(Italy) Simone Campedelli					2^{18+12}				30	30
15	(Latvia) Mārtiņš Sesks			3^{15+10}		8^{4}				29	29
16	(Portugal) Ricardo Moura	2^{18+10}								28	28
17	(Republic of Ireland) Callum Devine								3^{15+10}	25	25
18	(Italy) Andrea Crugnola					3^{15+8}				23	23
19	(Germany) Albert von Thurn und Taxis		17	16	Ret	Ret	Ret	6^{8+3}	6^{8+4}	23	23
20	(Finland) Mikko Hirvonen							3^{15+6}		21	21
21	(Czech Republic) Tomáš Kostka						4^{12+7}			19	19
22	(Austria) Niki Mayr-Melnhof		10^{1}			29		5^{10+6}	13^{0+2}	19	19
23	(Portugal) Bruno Magalhães	4^{12+6}								18	18
24	(Portugal) Ricardo Teodósio	5^{10+7}								17	17
25	(France) Pierre-Louis Loubet	Ret	5^{10+5}							15	15
26	(Poland) Aron Domźała				5^{10+4}					14	14
27	(Spain) Iván Ares		6^{8+5}							13	13
28	(Austria) Simon Wagner	Ret	25				6^{8+2}			10	10
29	(Poland) Tomasz Kasperczyk				6^{8+2}					10	10
30	(Sweden) Mattias Adielsson	20		10^{1}	7^{6}		26			7	7
31	(Cyprus) Alexandros Tsouloftas	7^{6}	14	11^{0+1}						7	7
32	(United States) Sean Johnston	21	28	28	22		22		7^{6+1}	7	7
33	(Czech Republic) Jaromír Tarabus						7^{6+1}			7	7
34	(Chile) Emilio Fernández							7^{6+1}		7	7
35	(Japan) Hiroki Arai			8^{4}	Ret^{0+2}	11	Ret			6	6
36	(Spain) Surhayen Pernía		7^{6}							6	6
37	(Poland) Mikołaj Marczyk				9^{2+4}		Ret			6	6
38	(Portugal) Bernardo Sousa	8^{4+1}								5	5
39	(Spain) Luis Monzón		8^{4+1}							5	5
40	(Norway) Eyvind Brynildsen			9^{2+3}						5	5
41	(Czech Republic) Erik Cais	17		Ret	21	17	11	15	8^{4}	4	4
42	(Czech Republic) Tomáš Pospíšilík						8^{4}			4	4
43	(Qatar) Abdulaziz Al-Kuwari							8^{4}		4	4
44	(Czech Republic) Vojtěch Štajf	9^{2}	11			10^{1}	Ret			3	3
45	(Hungary) Pál Lovász								9^{2+1}	3	3
46	(Brazil) Paulo Nobre	10^{1}	35	19	27	21	32	10^{1}	10^{1}	3	3
47	(Italy) Umberto Scandola					9^{2}				2	2
48	(Czech Republic) Martin Březík						9^{2}			2	2
49	(Spain) Efrén Llarena	13	21	23	Ret	20	10^{1}	14		1	1
50	(Poland) Kacper Wróblewski				10^{1}					1	1
51	(Lithuania) Vaidotas Žala			15^{0+1}	Ret					1	1
52	(Portugal) Luís Rego	Ret^{0+1}								1	1

Key
Colour	Result
Gold	Winner
Silver	2nd place
Bronze	3rd place
Green	Points finish
Blue	Non-points finish
Blue	Non-classified finish (NC)
Purple	Did not finish (Ret)
Black	Excluded (EX)
Black	Disqualified (DSQ)
White	Did not start (DNS)
White	Cancelled (C)
Blank	Withdrew entry from the event (WD)

==== ERC-2 ====
Pos	Driver	AZO (Portugal)	CAN (Spain)	LIE (Latvia)	POL (Poland)	RMC (Italy)	ZLÍ (Czech Republic)	CYP (Cyprus)	HUN (Hungary)	Points	Best 4
1	(Argentina) Juan Carlos Alonso	1^{25+14}	Ret^{0+6}		1^{25+14}		2^{18+11}	4^{12+9}		134	128
2	(Italy) Andrea Nucita		5^{10+7}	3^{15+8}	3^{15+10}	3^{15+7}	1^{25+13}		1^{25+7}	157	118
3	(Italy) Zelindo Melegari		2^{18+8}	4^{12+6}	2^{18+10}	2^{18+11}	Ret			101	101
4	(Poland) Dariusz Poloński		4^{12+5}	5^{10+8}	5^{10+6}	1^{25+13}	3^{15+7}		Ret	111	95
5	(Latvia) Ralfs Sirmacis			1^{25+14}						39	39
6	(Cyprus) Petros Panteli							1^{25+14}		39	39
7	(Russia) Dmitry Feofanov			Ret	4^{12+3}			3^{15+9}		39	39
8	(Spain) Alberto Monarri		1^{25+13}							38	38
9	(Kuwait) Meshari Al-Thefiri			2^{18+10}	Ret	Ret^{0+4}	WD	WD		32	32
10	(Cyprus) Antonis Chilimindris							2^{18+12}		30	30
11	(Russia) Sergey Remennik	2^{18+6}	DNS	Ret						24	24
12	(Spain) Carlos David García		3^{15+4}							19	19
13	(Latvia) Reinis Nitišs			6^{8+6}						14	14
14	(Lithuania) Vytautas Švedas			7^{6+1}						7	7

==== ERC-3 ====
Pos	Driver	AZO (Portugal)	CAN (Spain)	LIE (Latvia)	POL (Poland)	RMC (Italy)	ZLÍ (Czech Republic)	CYP (Cyprus)	HUN (Hungary)	Points	Best 6
1	(Spain) Efrén Llarena	1^{25+14}	4^{12+7}	5^{10+5}	Ret^{0+6}	4^{12+11}	1^{25+13}	1^{25+14}		179	173
2	(Czech Republic) Erik Cais	5^{10+5}		Ret^{0+1}	7^{6+3}	2^{18+10}	2^{18+10}	2^{18+12}	1^{25+14}	150	149
3	(Estonia) Ken Torn			1^{25+14}	1^{25+14}	1^{25+12}	5^{10+4}			129	129
4	(Norway) Sindre Furuseth	2^{18+11}	Ret^{0+4}	2^{18+10}	2^{18+10}	Ret	3^{15+10}			114	114
5	(France) Florian Bernardi		1^{25+13}		9^{2}	3^{15+10}	6^{8+2}	4^{12+8}		95	95
6	(France) Jean-Baptiste Franceschi		2^{18+12}	4^{12+6}			4^{12+8}			68	68
7	(Portugal) Pedro Antunes	4^{12+9}	5^{10+5}	6^{8+4}	6^{8+4}	10^{1}	WD			61	61
8	(France) Yohan Rossel	6^{8+4}	3^{15+11}	7^{6}			7^{6+2}			52	52
9	(Turkey) Orhan Avcioğlu					6^{+8+2}	10^{1}	3^{15+10}	5^{10+3}	49	49
10	(Bulgaria) Ekaterina Stratieva							5^{10+3}	3^{15+9}	39	39
11	(Germany) Marijan Griebel								2^{18+11}	29	29
12	(Norway) Steve Røkland	10^{1+1}		3^{15+10}	Ret					27	27
13	(Sweden) Elias Lundberg	3^{15+9}	12	14	Ret^{0+1}	Ret	Ret			25	25
14	(Sweden) Adam Westlund				3^{15+8}					23	23
15	(Hungary) Miklós Csomós						8^{4}		4^{12+6}	22	22
16	(Luxembourg) Grégoire Munster	11	6^{8+3}	Ret	Ret	7^{6+3}	Ret			20	20
17	(Czech Republic) Jan Talaš	7^{6}	EX		Ret	5^{10+3}	Ret			19	19
18	(Poland) Tomasz Zbroja				4^{12+5}					17	17
19	(Germany) Roman Schwedt	Ret	Ret	9^{2}	5^{10+1}	Ret^{0+4}				17	17
20	(Cyprus) Kostantinos Telavantos							6^{8+7}		15	15
21	(United States) Sean Johnston	8^{4}	9^{2}	10^{1}	8^{4}		11			11	11
22	(Austria) Simon Wagner	Ret^{0+3}	7^{6+1}							10	10
23	(Finland) Miika Hokkanen		14	12^{0+6}	Ret^{0+4}					10	10
24	(Hungary) Kristóf Klausz		11	8^{4}			Ret			4	4
25	(Bulgaria) Grigor Grigorov		8^{4}				WD			4	4
26	(Romania) Cristiana Oprea					8^{4}				4	4
27	(Czech Republic) Petr Semerád		10^{1}	WD	WD		12^{0+3}			4	4
28	(Czech Republic) Adam Březík						14^{0+4}			4	4
29	(Russia) Dmitriy Myachin	9^{2}								2	2
30	(United Kingdom) Catie Munnings	Ret	Ret	11		9^{2}	WD			2	2
31	(Czech Republic) René Dohnal						9^{2}			2	2
33	(Estonia) Gregor Jeets			13	10^{1}	Ret	13			1	1

==== Ladies Trophy ====
Pos	Driver	AZO (Portugal)	CAN (Spain)	LIE (Latvia)	POL (Poland)	RMC (Italy)	ZLÍ (Czech Republic)	CYP (Cyprus)	HUN (Hungary)	Points	Best 4
1	(Bulgaria) Ekaterina Stratieva						2	1	1	183	183
2	(United Kingdom) Nabila Tejpar		2		1		1		Ret	117	117
3	(United Kingdom) Catie Munnings	Ret	Ret	1		3	WD			93	93
4	(Spain) Emma Falcón		1			1				70	70
5	(Hungary) Adrienn Vogel								2	65	65
6	(Romania) Cristiana Oprea					2				55	55
7	(Hungary) Petra Krajnyák								3	55	55

==== ERC 1 Junior ====
Pos	Driver	AZO (Portugal)	CAN (Spain)	LIE (Latvia)	POL (Poland)	RMC (Italy)	ZLÍ (Czech Republic)	Points	Best 4
1	(Czech Republic) Filip Mareš			4^{12+6}	1^{25+14}	1^{25+13}	1^{25+13}	133	133
2	(United Kingdom) Chris Ingram	1^{25+13}	2^{18+13}	3^{15+10}	Ret	2^{18+13}	2^{18+13}	156	131
3	(Sweden) Mattias Adielsson	4^{12+4}		6^{8+4}	2^{18+10}		5^{10+5}	71	71
4	(Cyprus) Alexandros Tsouloftas	2^{18+11}	4^{12+8}	7^{6+4}				59	59
5	(Latvia) Mārtiņš Sesks			3^{15+15}		3^{15+10}		55	55
6	(Japan) Hiroki Arai			5^{10+6}	Ret^{0+5}	4^{12+8}	Ret	41	41
7	(Norway) Oliver Solberg			1^{25+14}				39	39
8	(Spain) Pepe López		1^{25+12}					37	37
9	(Spain) Emma Falcón		5^{10+6}		5^{10+6}			32	32
10	(France) Pierre-Louis Loubet	Ret	3^{15+11}					26	26
11	(Poland) Mikołaj Marczyk				3^{15+11}		Ret	26	26
12	(Portugal) Miguel Correia	3^{15+9}						24	24
13	(Austria) Simon Wagner						3^{15+9}	24	24
14	(Czech Republic) Tomáš Pospíšilík						4^{12+7}	19	19

==== ERC 3 Junior ====
Pos	Driver	AZO (Portugal)	CAN (Spain)	LIE (Latvia)	POL (Poland)	RMC (Italy)	ZLÍ (Czech Republic)	Points	Best 4
1	(Spain) Efrén Llarena	1^{25+14}	2^{18+11}	5^{10+5}	Ret^{0+6}	3^{15+12}	1^{25+13}	154	133
2	(Estonia) Ken Torn			1^{25+14}	1^{25+14}	1^{25+13}	5^{10+6}	132	132
3	(Norway) Sindre Furuseth	2^{18+11}	Ret^{0+6}	2^{18+10}	2^{18+10}	Ret	3^{15+10}	116	110
4	(Czech Republic) Erik Cais	5^{10+6}		Ret^{0+1}	6^{8+3}	2^{18+11}	2^{18+10}	85	84
5	(France) Jean-Baptiste Franceschi		1^{25+14}	4^{12+6}			4^{12+9}	78	78
6	(Portugal) Pedro Antunes	4^{12+9}	3^{15+9}	6^{8+4}	5^{10+4}	6^{8+2}	WD	81	71
7	(Luxembourg) Grégoire Munster	8^{4}	4^{12+7}	Ret	Ret^{0+1}	5^{10+4}	Ret	38	38
8	(Norway) Steve Røkland	7^{6+2}		3^{15+10}	Ret			33	33
9	(Sweden) Elias Lundberg	3^{15+9}	9^{2}	11	Ret^{0+2}	Ret	Ret	28	28
10	(Czech Republic) Jan Talaš	6^{8+2}	Ret		Ret	4^{12+6}	Ret	28	28
11	(Sweden) Adam Westlund				3^{15+9}			24	24
12	(Germany) Roman Schwedt	Ret	Ret	8^{4}	4^{12+2}	Ret^{0+4}		22	22
13	(Czech Republic) Petr Semerád		7^{6+1}	WD	WD		6^{8+4}	19	19
14	(Austria) Simon Wagner	Ret^{0+3}	5^{10+5}					18	18
15	(Estonia) Gregor Jeets			10^{1}	7^{6+1}	Ret	7^{6+1}	15	15
16	(Finland) Miika Hokkanen		11^{0+2}	9^{2+6}	Ret^{0+4}			14	14
17	(Hungary) Kristóf Klausz		8^{4}	7^{6}			Ret	10	10
18	(Bulgaria) Grigor Grigorov		6^{8+1}				WD	9	9
19	(United Kingdom) Nabila Tejpar		10^{1}		8^{4}		NC	5	5

=== Abarth Rally Cup ===
Pos	Driver	CAN (Spain)	LIE (Latvia)	POL (Poland)	RMC (Italy)	ZLÍ (Czech Republic)	HUN (Hungary)	Points
1	(Italy) Andrea Nucita	4	1	1	3	1	1	127
2	(Poland) Dariusz Poloński	3	2	2	1	2	Ret	94
3	(Spain) Alberto Monarri	1						25
4	(Spain) Carlos David García	2						18
5	(Italy) Zelindo Melegari				2	Ret		18
6	(Latvia) Reinis Nitišs		3					15

=== Teams' Championship ===
Pos	Driver	AZO (Portugal)	CAN (Spain)	LIE (Latvia)	POL (Poland)	RMC (Italy)	ZLÍ (Czech Republic)	CYP (Cyprus)	HUN (Hungary)	Points	Best 6
1	(France) Saintéloc Junior Team	24	8	36	43	15	17	12	33	188	168
2	(Germany) Toksport World Rally Team	30	18	16	Ret	22	19	40	30	175	159
3	(Czech Republic) ACCR Czech Rally Team I	18	8	8	20	30	36	22	25	167	151
4	(Latvia) Sport Racing Technologies	25	15	35	15	Ret	Ret	15	Ret	105	105
5	Rally Team Spain	25	18	15	Ret	15	25			98	98
6	(Estonia) Estonian Autosport Junior Team			27	31	25	12			95	95
7	(France) Peugeot Rally Academy	8	25	14		8	10	25		90	90
8	FPAK Portugal Team ERC	16	15	12	10	6	0			59	59
9	(Hungary) Mol Racing Team	Ret	12	0	4	8	Ret	10	10	44	44
10	(Germany) ADAC Opel Rallye Junior Team	17	14	1	Ret	10	Ret			42	42
11	(Germany) Hyundai Motorsport N				18	4			15	37	37
12	(Italy) Loran SRL		0	0	0	25	2		2	29	29
13	(Spain) Citroën Rally Team		25							25	25
14	(Czech Republic) Škoda Motorsport						25			25	25
15	(Hungary) Turán Motorsport SE								25	25	25
16	(Latvia) LMT Autosporta Akadēmija			15		6				21	21
17	(Austria) BRR Baumschlager Rally & Racing Team		0	0	Ret	Ret	Ret	12	8	20	20
18	(Hungary) East Motorsport Kft.						8		12	20	20
19	(United Kingdom) Orange 1 M-Sport Rally Team					18				21	21
20	(Estonia) MM Motorsport							18		18	18
21	(Germany) Team Romo	Ret	Ret	6	12	Ret				18	18
22	(Brazil) Palmeirinha Rally	6	0	0	0	0	0	8	4	18	18
23	(Poland) GO+Cars GO+EAuto				15		1			16	16
24	Team Hyundai Portugal / Bruno Magalhães	15								15	15
25	(Spain) Hyundai Motor España		14							14	14
26	(Cyprus) Q8 Oils Rally Team							14		14	14
27	(Czech Republic) Kresta Racing s.r.o.						12			12	12
28	(Hungary) Klaus Motorsport Kft		4	8						12	12
29	(Portugal) Raly/Auto Açoreana Racing	10								10	10
30	(France) 2C Competition	Ret	10							10	10
31	(Austria) Stengg Motorsport	Ret	10							10	10
32	(Finland) TGS Worldwide				10					10	10
33	(Poland) Rally Technology		0	0	0	0	10		Ret	10	10
34	Sweden National Team	2		2	6		0			10	10
35	(Poland) Tiger Energy Drink Rally Team				8					8	8
36	(Lithuania) Agrorodeo			0	Ret		8			8	8
37	(Czech Republic) ACCR Czech Rally Team II	Ret		Ret		2	6			8	8
38	(Austria) STARD			6	Ret	1	Ret			7	7
39	(Poland) BTH Import Stal Rally Team				1		6			7	7
40	(Hungary) Érdi Team Kft.		Ret	0		0		6	Ret	6	6
41	(Hungary) LPWM Sport ktf.								6	6	6
42	(Russia) TB Racing	4								4	4
43	(Spain) Auto Laca Competición		4							4	4
44	(Czech Republic) Samohýl Škoda Team						4			4	4
45	(Poland) Škoda Polska Motorsport				2		Ret			2	2
46	(Russia) Russian Performance Motorsport	1		Ret						1	1
47	(Spain) ACSM Rallye Team		1							1	1
48	(Latvia) Sporta Klubs Autostils Rally Team			1				0		1	1
49	(Czech Republic) Hyundai Kowax Racing						1			1	1
50	(Cyprus) Yiangou Motorsport Ltd							1		1	1

=== Nations Cup ===
Pos	Driver	AZO (Portugal)	CAN (Spain)	LIE (Latvia)	POL (Poland)	RMC (Italy)	ZLÍ (Czech Republic)	CYP (Cyprus)	HUN (Hungary)	Points	Best 6
1	(Czech Republic) ACCR Czech Rally Team I	37	37	25	40	43	43	50	25	300	250
2	Rally Team Spain	25	43	18	0	30	25			141	141
3	FPAK Portugal Team ERC	33	18	15	33	22	18			139	139
4	(Estonia) Estonian Autosport Junior Team			37	37	25	25			124	124
5	(Germany) ADAC Opel Rallye Junior Team	28	25	10	0	12	0			75	75
6	Sweden National Team	15		18	18		15			66	66
7	(Czech Republic) ACCR Czech Rally Team II	Ret		Ret		18	12			30	30
