= 2015 European Rally Championship =

Seasons
- ← 2014 2016 →

The 2015 European Rally Championship season was the 63rd season of the FIA European Rally Championship, the European continental championship series in rallying. The season was also the third following the merge between the European Rally Championship and the Intercontinental Rally Challenge.

For this year the drivers have to register for the championship, and the categories have been renamed into ERC 1 (for S2000, R5 and RRC (last year) cars), ERC 2 (category for R4 production cars, previously titled N4) and ERC 3 (for R1, R2 and R3 cars).

== Calendar ==
The calendar for the 2015 season featured ten rallies, one less than the 2014 calendar.

Round	Dates	Rally name	Surface	Mini-Series
1	4–6 January	(Austria) Internationale Jänner Rallye	Mixed	Ice Master
2	6–8 February	(Latvia) Rally Liepāja–Ventspils	Mixed	Ice Master
3	2–4 April	(Northern Ireland) / (Republic of Ireland) Circuit of Ireland	Tarmac	Asphalt Master
4	4–6 June	(Portugal) Rallye Açores	Gravel	Gravel Master
5	25–27 June	(Belgium) Ypres Rally	Tarmac	Asphalt Master
6	17–19 July	Rally Estonia	Gravel	Gravel Master
7	28–30 August	(Czech Republic) Barum Rally Zlín	Tarmac	Asphalt Master
8	25–27 September	Cyprus Rally	Mixed	Gravel Master
9	9–11 October	(Greece) Acropolis Rally^{1}	Mixed	Gravel Master
10	29–31 October	(Switzerland) Rallye International du Valais^{2}	Mixed	Asphalt Master

Notes:

- ^1 – The Acropolis Rally has been moved to October.
- ^2 – Tour de Corse was scheduled to be the final event of the season, but the rally organisers moved the rally to the World Rally Championship to replace Rallye de France Alsace. Rallye International du Valais was announced as its replacement.

== Selected entries ==
Icon	Cup
L	Ladies Trophy
ERC-2	ERC-2
ERC-3	ERC-3
J	ERC Junior

Registered drivers
Constructor	Car	Team	Driver	Co-driver	Cup	Rounds
Peugeot	Peugeot 208 T16 R5	(France) Peugeot Rally Academy	(Republic of Ireland) Craig Breen	(United Kingdom) Scott Martin		1–7, 9–10
Peugeot	Peugeot 208 T16 R5	(France) Peugeot Rally Academy	(France) Charles Martin	(France) Thierry Salva		3–4, 7, 9
Peugeot	Peugeot 208 T16 R5	(France) Peugeot Rally Academy	(France) Stéphane Lefebvre	(Belgium) Stéphane Prévot		5
Peugeot	Peugeot 208 T16 R5	(France) Peugeot Rally Academy	(Estonia) Timmu Kõrge	(Estonia) Erki Pints		6
Peugeot	Peugeot 208 T16 R5	(France) Peugeot Rally Academy	(Sweden) Emil Bergkvist	(Sweden) Joakim Sjöberg		10
Peugeot	Peugeot 208 T16 R5	(France) HRT Rally Team	(Switzerland) Jonathan Hirschi	(France) Vincent Landais		1–2
Peugeot	Peugeot 208 T16 R5	(France) HRT Rally Team	(Switzerland) Jonathan Hirschi	(France) Victor Vellotto		10
Peugeot	Peugeot 208 T16 R5	(Italy) Delta Rally	(Portugal) Bruno Magalhães	(Portugal) Hugo Magalhães		4–5, 8–10
Peugeot	Peugeot 208 T16 R5	Peugeot Belgium Luxembourg	(Belgium) Kris Princen	(Belgium) Peter Kaspers		5
Peugeot	Peugeot 208 T16 R5	(Finland) Hannu's Rally Team	(Finland) Juha Salo	(Finland) Marko Salminen		6
Peugeot	Peugeot 208 T16 R5	(Sweden) Bjorn Adolfsson	(Sweden) Bjorn Adolfsson	(Sweden) Mikael Johansson		5
Peugeot	Peugeot 208 T16 R5	(Germany) Romo Motorsport Technik	(France) Bryan Bouffier	(France) Thibault De La Haye		10
Peugeot	Peugeot 208 T16 R5	(Germany) AC Mayen	(Germany) Dirk Riebensahm	(Germany) Alexander Rath		10
Peugeot	Peugeot 207 S2000	(Italy) Delta Rally	(France) Robert Consani	(France) Maxime Vilmot		1–2
Peugeot	Peugeot 207 S2000	(Italy) Delta Rally	(Italy) Giacomo Costenaro	(Italy) Justin Bardini		2, 4
Peugeot	Peugeot 207 S2000	(Italy) Delta Rally	(Italy) Giacomo Costenaro	(Italy) Pietro Ometto		3
Peugeot	Peugeot 207 S2000	(Italy) Delta Rally	(Italy) Paolo Oriella	(Italy) Pietro Ometto		10
Peugeot	Peugeot 207 S2000	(Austria) Motor Team	(Austria) Johannes Keferbock	(Austria) Hannes Grundlinger		1
Peugeot	Peugeot 207 S2000	(Belgium) Autostal Duindistel VZW	(Belgium) Claudie Tanghe	(Belgium) Denis Squedin		5
Peugeot	Peugeot 207 S2000	(Switzerland) Lugano Racing Team	(Switzerland) Florian Gonon	(Switzerland) Manuel Guex		10
Peugeot	Peugeot 207 S2000	(Germany) ADAC Hessen-Thüringen e.V.	(Germany) Nico Leschhorn	(Germany) Josefine Beinke		10
Peugeot	Peugeot 207 S2000	(Switzerland) Ecurie des Ordons	(Switzerland) Jean-Marc Salomon	(Switzerland) David Comment		10
Peugeot	Peugeot 208 R2	(Poland) Rally Technology	(Poland) Sławomir Ogryzek	(Poland) Jakub Wróbel	ERC-3	1–2
Peugeot	Peugeot 208 R2	(Poland) Rally Technology	(Poland) Sławomir Ogryzek	(Poland) Przemysław Mazur	ERC-3	5
Peugeot	Peugeot 208 R2	(Poland) Rally Technology	(Poland) Wojciech Chuchała	(Poland) Sebastian Rozwadowski	ERC-3 J	2
Peugeot	Peugeot 208 R2	(Slovenia) OPV Šport	(Slovenia) Rok Turk	(Slovenia) Blanca Kacin	ERC-3	1, 3, 5
Peugeot	Peugeot 208 R2	(France) PH Sport	(Portugal) Renato Pita	(Portugal) Hugo Magalhães	ERC-3	1
Peugeot	Peugeot 208 R2	(France) PH Sport	(Portugal) Renato Pita	(Portugal) Luís Cavaleiro	ERC-3	4
Peugeot	Peugeot 208 R2	(France) PH Sport	(Portugal) Renato Pita	(Portugal) Mário Castro	ERC-3	7, 10
Peugeot	Peugeot 208 R2	Peugeot Belgium Luxembourg	(Belgium) Gino Bux	(Belgium) Eric Borguet	ERC-3 J	2–5
Peugeot	Peugeot 208 R2	(United Kingdom) Peugeot UK	(United Kingdom) Chris Ingram	(France) Gabin Moreau	ERC-3 J	2–7
Peugeot	Peugeot 208 R2	(Norway) Steve Røkland Motorsport	(Norway) Steve Røkland	(United Kingdom) James Aldridge	ERC-3 J	2–4
Peugeot	Peugeot 208 R2	(Norway) Steve Røkland Motorsport	(Norway) Steve Røkland	(Sweden) Patrik Barth	ERC-3 J	6–7
Peugeot	Peugeot 208 R2	(France) Peugeot Rally Academy	(Portugal) Diogo Gago	(Portugal) Jorge Carvalho	ERC-3 J	2–7
Peugeot	Peugeot 208 R2	(Latvia) Sports Racing Technologies	(Latvia) Ralfs Sirmacis	(Latvia) Artūrs Šimins	ERC-3 J	2–7
Peugeot	Peugeot 208 R2	(Latvia) Sports Racing Technologies	(Russia) Vasily Gryazin	(Russia) Dimitry Lebedik	ERC-3 J	2–6
Peugeot	Peugeot 208 R2	(Belgium) Ice Pol Racing Team	(Belgium) Guillaume de Mévius	(Belgium) Geoffrey Brion	ERC-3 J	2
Peugeot	Peugeot 208 R2	(United Kingdom) Armstrong Motorsport	(United Kingdom) Jon Armstrong	(Republic of Ireland) Noel O'Sullivan	ERC-3 J	2–5
Peugeot	Peugeot 208 R2	(Sweden) Adielsson Motorsport	(Sweden) Mattias Adielsson	(Sweden) Christoffer Bäck	ERC-3 J	2–4, 6–7
Peugeot	Peugeot 208 R2	(Poland) LP Rally Team	(Poland) Łukasz Pieniążek	(Poland) Jakub Gerber	ERC-3 J	2–5, 7
Peugeot	Peugeot 208 R2	(Republic of Ireland) CMC Motorsport	(Republic of Ireland) Kevin Eves	(Republic of Ireland) Chris Melly	ERC-3 J	3
Peugeot	Peugeot 208 R2	(Romania) Napoca Rally Academy	(Romania) Florin Tincescu	(Romania) Sergiu Itu	ERC-3 J	3–7
Peugeot	Peugeot 208 R2	(Hungary) Klaus Motorsport	(Hungary) Kristóf Klausz	(Hungary) Balázs Kecskeméti	ERC-3 J	3, 7
Peugeot	Peugeot 208 R2	(Portugal) AR Vidal Racing	(Portugal) Wilson Aguiar	(Portugal) José Camacho	ERC-3	4
Peugeot	Peugeot 208 R2	(Belgium) Pevatec Competition	(Belgium) Joachim Wagemans	(Belgium) Andy De Baeremaeker	ERC-3 J	5, 7
Peugeot	Peugeot 208 R2	(Croatia) AK Delta Sport	(Hungary) Szabolcs Várkonyi	(Hungary) Botond Csányi	ERC-3	5, 7
Peugeot	Peugeot 208 R2	(Estonia) Cueks Racing	(Estonia) Miko Niinemäe	(Estonia) Martin Valter	ERC-3 J	6
Peugeot	Peugeot 208 R2	(Sweden) Ledin Motorsport	(Sweden) Mattias Ledin	(Sweden) Erik Lindqvist	ERC-3 J	6
Citroën	Citroën DS3 R5	(France) PH Sport	(France) Stéphane Lefebvre	(Belgium) Stéphane Prévot		1
Citroën	Citroën DS3 R5	(Italy) Delta Rally	(France) Robert Consani	(France) Maxime Vilmot		3–7
Citroën	Citroën DS3 R5	(Italy) Delta Rally	(France) Robert Consani	(Belgium) Lara Vanneste		8–9
Citroën	Citroën DS3 R5	(Italy) Delta Rally	(Switzerland) Federico Della Casa	(Italy) Domenico Pozzi		10
Citroën	Citroën DS3 R5	(United Kingdom) DGM Sport	(United Kingdom) Jonathan Greer	(United Kingdom) Kirsty Riddick		3
Citroën	Citroën DS3 R5	(Portugal) DS3 Vodafone Team	(Portugal) José Pedro Fontes	(Portugal) Miguel Ramalho		4
Citroën	Citroën DS3 R5	(Belgium) Autostal Duindistel VZW	(Netherlands) Kevin Abbring	(Belgium) Pieter Tsjoen		5
Citroën	Citroën DS3 R5	(Czech Republic) Gemini Clinic Rally Team	(France) Bryan Bouffier	(France) Thibault De La Haye		5
Citroën	Citroën DS3 R5	(Czech Republic) Gemini Clinic Rally Team	(Czech Republic) Miroslav Jakeš	(Czech Republic) Jaroslav Novák		7, 10
Citroën	Citroën DS3 R5	(Italy) D-Max Racing	(Belgium) Cédric Cherain	(Belgium) Abdré Leyh		5
Citroën	Citroën DS3 R5	(Belgium) Go Drive Racing	(Belgium) Vincent Verschueren	(Belgium) Veronique Hostens		5
Citroën	Citroën DS3 R5	(Estonia) ME3 Rally Team	(Estonia) Karl Kruuda	(Estonia) Martin Järveoja		6
Citroën	Citroën DS3 R5	(Belgium) J-Motorsport	(Greece) Jourdan Serderidis	(Belgium) Frédéric Miclotte		9
Citroën	Citroën DS3 R5	(Switzerland) D-Max Swiss	(Switzerland) Mike Coppens	(Switzerland) Crispino Arimondi		10
Citroën	Citroën DS3 RRC	(Switzerland) D-Max Swiss	(Switzerland) Olivier Burri	(France) Nicolas Klinger		10
Citroën	Citroën DS3 R3T	(Finland) Printsport	(Norway) Ole Christian Veiby	(Norway) Anders Jæger	ERC-3	1, 6
Citroën	Citroën DS3 R3T	(Romania) Napoca Rally Academy	(Italy) Simone Tempestini	(Italy) Matteo Chiarcossi	ERC-3	1
Citroën	Citroën DS3 R3T	(Poland) C-Rally	(Poland) Aron Domżała	(Poland) Szymon Gospodarczyk	ERC-3	2
Citroën	Citroën DS3 R3T	(Portugal) RF Competições	(Portugal) Paulo Neto	(Portugal) Vítor Oliveira	ERC-3	4
Citroën	Citroën DS3 R3T	(Portugal) Henrique Moniz Rally Team	(Portugal) Henrique Moniz	(Portugal) Jorge Diniz	ERC-3	4
Citroën	Citroën DS3 R3T	(Czech Republic) CERS Performance	(Czech Republic) Ondřej Bisaha	(Czech Republic) Petr Píža	ERC-3	7
Citroën	Citroën C2 R2	(Finland) Printsport	(Estonia) Rainer Rohtmets	(Estonia) Rauno Rohtmets	ERC-3 J	2
Citroën	Citroën C2 R2	(Hungary) Bakó Rally Team	(Bulgaria) Ekaterina Stratieva	(Hungary) Yulianna Nyírfás	L ERC-3	3, 5, 7, 10
Citroën	Citroën C2 R2	(Portugal) Miguel Carvalho	(Portugal) Miguel Carvalho	(Portugal) Paulo Lopes	ERC-3	4
Citroën	Citroën C2 R2	(Serbia) MM Power	(Serbia) Yovana Jovanović	(Serbia) Vukasin Tomić	L	10
Ford	Ford Fiesta R5	(Poland) Lotos Rally Team	(Poland) Kajetan Kajetanowicz	(Poland) Jarosław Baran		1–4, 6–9
Ford	Ford Fiesta R5	(Ukraine) Chervonenko Racing	(Russia) Alexey Lukyanuk	(Ukraine) Yevgen Chervonenko		1–3
Ford	Ford Fiesta R5	(Ukraine) Chervonenko Racing	(Russia) Alexey Lukyanuk	(Russia) Alexey Arnautov		7–10
Ford	Ford Fiesta R5	(France) 100% Sport	(France) Jean-Michel Raoux	(France) Thomas Escartefigue		1
Ford	Ford Fiesta R5	(France) 100% Sport	(France) Jean-Michel Raoux	(France) Laurent Magat		4
Ford	Ford Fiesta R5	(Hungary) Extrem Sport Kft.	(Hungary) Jozsef Trencsenyi	(Hungary) Gabor Verba		1
Ford	Ford Fiesta R5	(Italy) Gabriele Noberasco	(Italy) Gabriele Noberasco	(Italy) Michele Ferrara		1
Ford	Ford Fiesta R5	(Estonia) MM Motorsport	(Estonia) Raul Jeets	(Estonia) Andrus Toom		2–3, 6–9
Ford	Ford Fiesta R5	(Estonia) MM Motorsport	(Estonia) Raul Jeets	(Estonia) Kristo Kraag		10
Ford	Ford Fiesta R5	(Estonia) MM Motorsport	(Estonia) Sander Pärn	(United Kingdom) James Morgan		6
Ford	Ford Fiesta R5	(Poland) C-Rally	(Poland) Jarosław Kołtun	(Poland) Ireneusz Pleskot		2, 6
Ford	Ford Fiesta R5	(United Kingdom) Dom Buckley Motorsport	(United Kingdom) Alastair Fisher	(United Kingdom) Gordon Noble		3
Ford	Ford Fiesta R5	(United Kingdom) CA1 Sport Ltd	(Republic of Ireland) Robert Barrable	(Republic of Ireland) Damien Connolly		3
Ford	Ford Fiesta R5	(Republic of Ireland) Wright Rallying	(Republic of Ireland) Stephen Wright	(Republic of Ireland) Mikie Galvin		3
Ford	Ford Fiesta R5	(Portugal) P&B Racing	(Portugal) João Barros	(Portugal) Jorge Henriques		4
Ford	Ford Fiesta R5	(Portugal) ARC Sport	(Portugal) Ricardo Moura	(Portugal) António Costa		4
Ford	Ford Fiesta R5	(Belgium) Autostal Duindistel VZW	(Belgium) Bernd Casier	(Belgium) Pieter Vyncke		5
Ford	Ford Fiesta R5	(Belgium) Autostal Duindistel VZW	(Belgium) Davy Vanneste	(Belgium) Eddy Snaet		5
Ford	Ford Fiesta R5	(Belgium) Autostal Duindistel VZW	(Belgium) Didier Duquesne	(Belgium) Filip Cuvelier		5
Ford	Ford Fiesta R5	(Estonia) OT Racing	(Estonia) Martin Kangur	(Estonia) Kuldar Sikk		6
Ford	Ford Fiesta R5	(Poland) Tiger Rally Team	(Poland) Tomasz Kasperczyk	(Poland) Damian Syty		6
Ford	Ford Fiesta R5	(Russia) TAIF Rally Team	(Russia) Radik Shaymiev	(Russia) Maxim Tsvetkov		6
Ford	Ford Fiesta R5	(Sweden) Lars Stugemo	(Sweden) Lars Stugemo	(Sweden) Miriam Walfridsson		6
Ford	Ford Fiesta R5	(Czech Republic) TRT Czech Rally Sport	(Czech Republic) Roman Odložilík	(Czech Republic) Martin Tureček		7
Ford	Ford Fiesta R5	(Switzerland) Lugano Racing Team	(Switzerland) Pascal Perroud	(France) Mélinda Beuret		10
Ford	Ford Fiesta R5	(Switzerland) D-Max Swiss	(Switzerland) Sébastien Carron	(Switzerland) Lucien Revaz		10
Ford	Ford Fiesta R5	(France) Accro Race	(Switzerland) Laurent Vukasovic	(Switzerland) Steve Groux		10
Ford	Ford Fiesta S2000	(Austria) ZM Racing Team	(Austria) Hermann Neubauer	(Austria) Bernhard Ettel		1, 7
Ford	Ford Fiesta S2000	(United Kingdom) M-Sport	(United Kingdom) Euan Thorburn	(United Kingdom) Paul Beaton		3, 5
Ford	Ford Fiesta RRC	(Republic of Ireland) Combilift Rallying	(Republic of Ireland) Sam Moffett	(Republic of Ireland) Karl Atkinson		3–5
Ford	Ford Fiesta RRC	(Republic of Ireland) Combilift Rallying	(Republic of Ireland) Josh Moffett	(Republic of Ireland) John Rowan		3–5
Ford	Ford Fiesta R2	(Latvia) Sports Racing Technologies	(Latvia) Reinis Nitišs	(Latvia) Māris Neikšāns	ERC-3	2
Ford	Ford Fiesta R2	(Latvia) LMT Autosporta Akadēmija	(Latvia) Emils Blūms	(Latvia) Reinis Vilsons	ERC-3 J	2, 4
Ford	Ford Fiesta R2	(Republic of Ireland) Calvin Beattie	(Republic of Ireland) Calvin Beattie	(Republic of Ireland) Darragh Mullen	ERC-3 J	3
Ford	Ford Fiesta R2	(United Kingdom) Major Motorsport	(United Kingdom) Gus Greensmith	(United Kingdom) Elliot Edmondson	ERC-3 J	3
Ford	Ford Fiesta R2	(United Kingdom) Armstrong Motorsport	(United Kingdom) Fergus Barlow	(United Kingdom) Alistair MacCrone	ERC-3 J	3
Ford	Ford Fiesta R2	(Belgium) New Ecurie Racing	(Belgium) Amaury Molle	(Belgium) Renaud Herman	ERC-3 J	5
Ford	Ford Fiesta R2	(Belgium) GPC Motorsport	(Belgium) Polle Geusens	(Belgium) Justine Demeestere	ERC-3	5
Ford	Ford Fiesta R2	(Belgium) Ice Pol Racing Team	(Belgium) Ghislain de Mévius	(Belgium) Johan Jalet	ERC-3 J	6
Škoda	Škoda Fabia S2000	(Czech Republic) T&T Czech National Team	(Czech Republic) Jaromír Tarabus	(Czech Republic) Daniel Trunkát		1, 3, 5, 8–9
Škoda	Škoda Fabia S2000	(Czech Republic) Tlusťák Racing	(Czech Republic) Antonín Tlusťák	(Czech Republic) Ladislav Kučera		All
Škoda	Škoda Fabia S2000	(Czech Republic) GPD Orsák Rally Sport	(Czech Republic) Martin Hudec	(Czech Republic) Petr Picka		2, 7
Škoda	Škoda Fabia S2000	(Czech Republic) GPD Orsák Rally Sport	(Czech Republic) Jaroslav Orsák	(Czech Republic) David Šmeidler		2, 4
Škoda	Škoda Fabia S2000	(Czech Republic) GPD Orsák Rally Sport	(Czech Republic) Tomáš Kurka	(Czech Republic) Karel Vajík		4
Škoda	Škoda Fabia S2000	(Czech Republic) GPD Orsák Rally Sport	(Norway) Petter Kristiansen	(Norway) Ole Kristian Brennum		5, 7
Škoda	Škoda Fabia S2000	(Czech Republic) GPD Orsák Rally Sport	(Germany) Sepp Wiegand	(Germany) Alexander Rath		7
Škoda	Škoda Fabia S2000	(Czech Republic) GPD Orsák Rally Sport	(Czech Republic) Martin Vlček	(Czech Republic) Jindřiška Žáková		7
Škoda	Škoda Fabia S2000	(United Kingdom) John McKillop Motorsport	(United Kingdom) Martin McCormack	(Republic of Ireland) James O'Reilly		3, 5
Škoda	Škoda Fabia S2000	(Republic of Ireland) Sharkey Motorsport	(Republic of Ireland) Joseph McGonigle	(Republic of Ireland) Ciaran Geaney		3
Škoda	Škoda Fabia S2000	(Republic of Ireland) Tommy Doyle	(Republic of Ireland) Tommy Doyle	(Republic of Ireland) Eamon Hayes		3
Škoda	Škoda Fabia S2000	(Portugal) Peres Competições	(Portugal) Carlos Martins	(Portugal) Daniel Amaral		4
Škoda	Škoda Fabia S2000	(Portugal) Cesar Racing Rally Team	(Portugal) Joaquim Alves	(Portugal) Pedro Alves		4
Škoda	Škoda Fabia S2000	(Finland) TGS Worldwide	(Finland) Teemu Suninen	(Finland) Mikko Markkula		6
Škoda	Škoda Fabia S2000	(Russia) Yuriy Arshanskiy	(Russia) Yuriy Arshanskiy	(Russia) Mikhail Soskin		6
Škoda	Škoda Fabia S2000	(Czech Republic) Comorant Team	(Czech Republic) Pavel Valoušek	(Czech Republic) Varonika Havelková		7
Škoda	Škoda Fabia S2000	(Czech Republic) Mogul Racing Team	(Czech Republic) Jan Černý	(Czech Republic) Petr Černohorský		7
Škoda	Škoda Fabia S2000	(Czech Republic) Sparrow Racing Team	(Czech Republic) Jan Jelínek	(Czech Republic) Petr Machů		7
Škoda	Škoda Fabia S2000	(Cyprus) Macila Rally Team	(Cyprus) Fikri Macila	(Cyprus) Mehmet Mişon		8
Škoda	Škoda Fabia R5	(Belgium) BMA Autosport	(Belgium) Freddy Loix	(Belgium) Johan Gitsels		5
Škoda	Škoda Fabia R5	(Czech Republic) Škoda Motorsport	(Czech Republic) Jan Kopecký	(Czech Republic) Pavel Dresler		7
Škoda	Škoda Fabia R5	(Czech Republic) T&T Czech National Team	(Czech Republic) Jaromír Tarabus	(Czech Republic) Daniel Trunkát		7
Škoda	Škoda Fabia R5	(Slovakia) Rufa Sport	(Czech Republic) Tomáš Kostka	(Czech Republic) Lukáš Kostka		7
Škoda	Škoda Fabia R5	(Netherlands) Kobus Tuning Rally Team	(Netherlands) Hermen Kobus	(Netherlands) Erik de Wild		7
Škoda	Škoda Fabia R5	Lascaris Foundation Team Greece	(Greece) Lambros Athanassoulas	(Greece) Nikolaos Zakheos		9
Škoda	Škoda Fabia R5	(Latvia) Sports Racing Technologies	(Russia) Nikolay Gryazin	(Russia) Yaroslav Fedorov		10
Subaru	Subaru Impreza WRX STI	(Czech Republic) Subaru Duck Czech National Team	(Czech Republic) Vojtěch Štajf	(Czech Republic) František Rajnoha	ERC-2	1–5, 7–8, 10
Subaru	Subaru Impreza WRX STI	(Czech Republic) Subaru Duck Czech National Team	(Czech Republic) Lumír Firla	(Czech Republic) Zdeněk Jůrka		7
Subaru	Subaru Impreza WRX STI	(Poland) Witek Motorsport	(Poland) Łukasz Kabaciński	(Poland) Grzegorz Dachowski	ERC-2	1–2
Subaru	Subaru Impreza WRX STI	Subaru Poland Rally Team	(Lithuania) Dominykas Butvilas	(Poland) Kamil Heller	ERC-2	2, 4, 6–9
Subaru	Subaru Impreza WRX STI	(Poland) Tiger Rally Team	(Poland) Tomasz Kasperczyk	(Poland) Damian Syty	ERC-2	2
Mitsubishi	Mitsubishi Lancer Evo IX	(Hungary) Botka Rally Team	(Hungary) Dávid Botka	(Hungary) Péter Mihalik	ERC-2	1–4, 6
Mitsubishi	Mitsubishi Lancer Evo IX	(Hungary) Botka Rally Team	(Hungary) Dávid Botka	(Hungary) Péter Szeles	ERC-2	7–10
Mitsubishi	Mitsubishi Lancer Evo IX	(Hungary) Hideg Team SE	(Hungary) Krisztian Hideg	(Hungary) István Kerék	ERC-2	1–3
Mitsubishi	Mitsubishi Lancer Evo IX	(Slovakia) Kit Racing	(Austria) Martin Fischerlehner	(Austria) Tobias Unterweger		1, 7
Mitsubishi	Mitsubishi Lancer Evo IX	(Ukraine) Tushkanova Motorsport	(Ukraine) Inessa Tushkanova	(Russia) Dmitry Chumak	L ERC-2	2
Mitsubishi	Mitsubishi Lancer Evo IX	(Ukraine) Tushkanova Motorsport	(Ukraine) Inessa Tushkanova	(Estonia) Cristen Laos	L ERC-2	6–7
Mitsubishi	Mitsubishi Lancer Evo IX	(Portugal) ARC Sport	(Portugal) Luís Rego	(Portugal) José Pedro Silva	ERC-2	4
Mitsubishi	Mitsubishi Lancer Evo IX	(Hungary) Topp-Cars Rallye Team	(Hungary) Péter Ranga	(Hungary) Janek Czakó	ERC-2	4, 8
Mitsubishi	Mitsubishi Lancer Evo IX	(Estonia) LEDrent Rally Team	(Estonia) Rainer Aus	(Estonia) Simo Koskinen	ERC-2	6
Mitsubishi	Mitsubishi Lancer Evo IX	(Estonia) Kaur Motorsport	(Estonia) Egon Kaur	(Estonia) Annika Arnek	ERC-2	6
Mitsubishi	Mitsubishi Lancer Evo IX	(Czech Republic) Tlusťák Racing	(Bulgaria) Ekaterina Stratieva	(Hungary) Yulianna Nyírfás	L	7
Mitsubishi	Mitsubishi Lancer Evo IX	(Hungary) Érdi Rally Team	(Hungary) Tibor Érdi	(Hungary) Gergely Patkó	ERC-2	8
Mitsubishi	Mitsubishi Lancer Evo IX	(Cyprus) Etex Rally Team	(Cyprus) Christos Demosthenous	(Cyprus) Pambos Laos	ERC-2	8
Mitsubishi	Mitsubishi Lancer Evo IX	(Cyprus) Antonis & Stavros Autoservice Ltd	(Cyprus) Stavros Antoniou	(Cyprus) Demetris Pieri	ERC-2	8
Mitsubishi	Mitsubishi Lancer Evo IX	(Cyprus) Eneos Motor Oil	(Cyprus) Panikos Polykarpou	(Austria) Gerald Winter	ERC-2	8
Mitsubishi	Mitsubishi Lancer Evo IX	Team Greece	(Greece) Lambros Kyrkos	(Greece) Giorgos Polizois	ERC-2	9
Mitsubishi	Mitsubishi Lancer Evo IX	(Romania) Vallino Rally Team	(Romania) Valentin Porcișteanu	(Romania) Dan Dobre		10
Mitsubishi	Mitsubishi Lancer Evo X	(Latvia) Autostils Rally Technica	(Estonia) Siim Plangi	(Estonia) Marek Sarapuu	ERC-2	2, 6
Mitsubishi	Mitsubishi Lancer Evo X	(Latvia) Vorobjovs Racing	(Latvia) Janis Vorobjovs	(Latvia) Andris Mālnieks	ERC-2	2
Mitsubishi	Mitsubishi Lancer Evo X	(Latvia) Vorobjovs Racing	(Russia) Alexander Gorelov	(Russia) Igor Skuridin	ERC-2	2
Mitsubishi	Mitsubishi Lancer Evo X	(Latvia) Vãgi Racing	(Latvia) Mārtiņš Svilis	(Latvia) Ivo Pūķis	ERC-2	2
Mitsubishi	Mitsubishi Lancer Evo X	(Hungary) Érdi Rally Team	(Hungary) Tibor Érdi	(Hungary) Attila Táborszki	ERC-2	3
Mitsubishi	Mitsubishi Lancer Evo X	(Hungary) Érdi Rally Team	(Hungary) Tibor Érdi	(Hungary) Gergely Patkó	ERC-2	5, 10
Mitsubishi	Mitsubishi Lancer Evo X	(Latvia) Neikšans Rally Sport	(Ukraine) Inessa Tushkanova	(Russia) Dmitry Chumak	L ERC-2	3
Mitsubishi	Mitsubishi Lancer Evo X	(Ukraine) Chervonenko Racing	(Russia) Alexey Lukyanuk	(Russia) Alexey Arnautov	ERC-2	6
Mitsubishi	Mitsubishi Lancer Evo X	(Estonia) Prorehv Rally Team	(Estonia) Roland Murakas	(Estonia) Kalle Adler	ERC-2	6
Mitsubishi	Mitsubishi Lancer Evo X	(Cyprus) Costas Petrou Motors	(Cyprus) Petros Panteli	(Cyprus) Constantinos Constantinou		8–9
Mini	Mini John Cooper Works S2000	(Czech Republic) EuroOil Invelt Czech National Team	(Czech Republic) Václav Pech	(Czech Republic) Petr Uhel		1, 7
Mini	Mini John Cooper Works S2000	KM Racing Slovakia	(Czech Republic) Tomáš Kurka	(Czech Republic) Karel Vajík		7
Mini	Mini John Cooper Works S2000	(Switzerland) Lugano Racing Team	(Switzerland) Urs Hunziker	(Germany) Melanie Wahl		10
Porsche	Porsche 997 GT3	(United Kingdom) Tuthill Porsche	(United Kingdom) Robert Woodside	(United Kingdom) Allan Harryman		3
Porsche	Porsche 997 GT3	(United Kingdom) Tuthill Porsche	(France) François Delecour	(France) Dominique Savignoni	R-GT Cup	5
Porsche	Porsche 997 GT3	(United Kingdom) Tuthill Porsche	(France) François Delecour	(France) Sabrina De Castelli	R-GT Cup	10
Porsche	Porsche 997 GT3	(United Kingdom) Tuthill Porsche	(France) Romain Dumas	(France) Denis Giraudet	R-GT Cup	5
Porsche	Porsche 997 GT3	(Belgium) Autostal Atlantic	(Belgium) Patrick Snijers	(Belgium) Arne Bruneel	R-GT Cup	5
Porsche	Porsche 996 GT3	(Belgium) Autostal Duindistel VZW	(Belgium) Marc Duez	(Belgium) Hendrik Béatse	R-GT Cup	5
Renault	Renault Clio R3	(Hungary) Klaus Motorsport	(Hungary) Kristóf Klausz	(Hungary) Balázs Kecskeméti	ERC-3	1–2
Renault	Renault Clio R3	(Czech Republic) CERS Performance	(Czech Republic) Ondřej Bisaha	(Slovenia) Lukáš Šintal	ERC-3	1–2
Renault	Renault Clio R3	(Russia) Thomas Beton Racing	(Russia) Mikhail Skripnikov	(Russia) Alexey Krylov	ERC-3	2
Renault	Renault Clio R3	(Romania) Colina Motorsport	(Romania) Alex Filip	(Romania) Bogdan Iancu	ERC-3	4, 7, 10
Renault	Renault Clio Sport	(Czech Republic) ČK Motorsport	(Czech Republic) Martina Daňhelová	(Czech Republic) Karolína Jugasová	L	1
Honda	Honda Civic Type-R FN2	(Poland) Rally Team Sikorski	(Poland) Grzegorz Sikorski	(Poland) Michał Jurgała	ERC-3	1–2, 7
Honda	Honda Civic Type-R R3	(Slovenia) AK Delta Sport	(Hungary) Szabolcs Várkonyi	(Hungary) Dávid Berendi	ERC-3	1, 3
Opel	Opel Adam R2	(Poland) MSZ Racing	(Poland) Aleks Zawada	(France) Cathy Derousseaux	ERC-3 J	2–7
Opel	Opel Adam R2	(Germany) ADAC Opel Rallye Junior Team	(Germany) Marijan Griebel	(Germany) Stefan Clemens	ERC-3 J	2–7
Opel	Opel Adam R2	(Germany) ADAC Opel Rallye Junior Team	(Sweden) Emil Bergkvist	(Sweden) Joakim Sjöberg	ERC-3 J	2–7
Opel	Opel Adam R2	(Germany) ADAC Sachsen	(Germany) Junius Tannert	(Luxembourg) Jennifer Thielen	ERC-3 J	2–3, 5, 7
Suzuki	Suzuki Swift Sport	(Russia) Morozov Rally Team	(Russia) Dmitry Morozov	(Hungary) Zoltán Szechenyi	ERC-3	8

== Results ==
Round	Rally name	Podium finishers			
Round	Rally name	Rank	Driver	Car	Time
1	(Austria) Internationale Jänner Rallye (4–6 January) — Results	1	(Poland) Kajetan Kajetanowicz	Ford Fiesta R5	2:50:52.6
1	(Austria) Internationale Jänner Rallye (4–6 January) — Results	2	(France) Robert Consani	Peugeot 207 S2000	2:57:28.8
1	(Austria) Internationale Jänner Rallye (4–6 January) — Results	3	(Russia) Alexey Lukyanuk	Ford Fiesta R5	2:59:20.7
2	(Latvia) Rally Liepāja–Ventspils (6–8 February) — Results	1	(Republic of Ireland) Craig Breen	Peugeot 208 T16 R5	1:56:49.1
2	(Latvia) Rally Liepāja–Ventspils (6–8 February) — Results	2	(Estonia) Siim Plangi	Mitsubishi Lancer Evo X	1:58:29.8
2	(Latvia) Rally Liepāja–Ventspils (6–8 February) — Results	3	(Lithuania) Dominykas Butvilas	Subaru Impreza WRX STi	2:02:37.7
3	(Northern Ireland) / (Republic of Ireland) Circuit of Ireland (2–4 April) — Results	1	(Republic of Ireland) Craig Breen	Peugeot 208 T16 R5	2:04:04.5
3	(Northern Ireland) / (Republic of Ireland) Circuit of Ireland (2–4 April) — Results	2	(Poland) Kajetan Kajetanowicz	Ford Fiesta R5	2:04:10.9
3	(Northern Ireland) / (Republic of Ireland) Circuit of Ireland (2–4 April) — Results	3	(Republic of Ireland) Josh Moffett	Ford Fiesta RRC	2:05:46.8
4	(Portugal) Rallye Açores (4–6 June) — Results	1	(Republic of Ireland) Craig Breen	Peugeot 208 T16 R5	2:45:59.6
4	(Portugal) Rallye Açores (4–6 June) — Results	2	(Poland) Kajetan Kajetanowicz	Ford Fiesta R5	2:47:01.7
4	(Portugal) Rallye Açores (4–6 June) — Results	3	(Portugal) Ricardo Moura	Ford Fiesta R5	2:48:13.9
5	(Belgium) Ypres Rally (25–27 June) — Results	1	(Belgium) Freddy Loix	Škoda Fabia R5	2:21:29.9
5	(Belgium) Ypres Rally (25–27 June) — Results	2	(France) Bryan Bouffier	Citroën DS3 R5	2:22:57.4
5	(Belgium) Ypres Rally (25–27 June) — Results	3	(Belgium) Vincent Verschueren	Citroën DS3 R5	2:23:32.4
6	Rally Estonia (17–19 July) — Results	1	(Russia) Alexey Lukyanuk	Mitsubishi Lancer Evo X	1:32:25.4
6	Rally Estonia (17–19 July) — Results	2	(Poland) Kajetan Kajetanowicz	Ford Fiesta R5	1:32:38.1
6	Rally Estonia (17–19 July) — Results	3	(Estonia) Rainer Aus	Mitsubishi Lancer Evo IX	1:33:32.4
7	(Czech Republic) Barum Rally Zlín (28–30 August) — Results	1	(Czech Republic) Jan Kopecký	Škoda Fabia R5	2:12:17.7
7	(Czech Republic) Barum Rally Zlín (28–30 August) — Results	2	(Czech Republic) Václav Pech	Mini John Cooper Works S2000	2:12:45.0
7	(Czech Republic) Barum Rally Zlín (28–30 August) — Results	3	(Poland) Kajetan Kajetanowicz	Ford Fiesta R5	2:12:57.6
8	Cyprus Rally (25–27 September) — Results	1	(Poland) Kajetan Kajetanowicz	Ford Fiesta R5	2:08:45.4
8	Cyprus Rally (25–27 September) — Results	2	(Portugal) Bruno Magalhães	Peugeot 208 T16 R5	2:13:10.5
8	Cyprus Rally (25–27 September) — Results	3	(France) Robert Consani	Citroën DS3 R5	2:14:21.4
9	(Greece) Acropolis Rally (9–11 October) — Results	1	(Poland) Kajetan Kajetanowicz	Ford Fiesta R5	1:32:11.1
9	(Greece) Acropolis Rally (9–11 October) — Results	2	(Republic of Ireland) Craig Breen	Peugeot 208 T16 R5	1:32:21.1
9	(Greece) Acropolis Rally (9–11 October) — Results	3	(Greece) Lambros Athanassoulas	Škoda Fabia R5	1:32:26.4
10	(Switzerland) Rallye du Valais (29–31 October) — Results	1	(Russia) Alexey Lukyanuk	Ford Fiesta R5	2:32:53.0
10	(Switzerland) Rallye du Valais (29–31 October) — Results	2	(Republic of Ireland) Craig Breen	Peugeot 208 T16 R5	2:34:13.6
10	(Switzerland) Rallye du Valais (29–31 October) — Results	3	(Switzerland) Olivier Burri	Citroën DS3 RRC	2:34:33.2

== Championship standings ==
=== Drivers' Championship ===
Last update: Rally du Valais

Pos	Driver	Points
1	(Poland) Kajetan Kajetanowicz	230
2	(Republic of Ireland) Craig Breen	185
3	(Russia) Alexey Lukyanuk	157
4	(France) Robert Consani	79
5	(Czech Republic) Jaromír Tarabus	75
6	(Portugal) Bruno Magalhães	68

=== ERC-2 ===
Pos	Driver	Points
1	(Hungary) Dávid Botka	231
2	(Czech Republic) Vojitěch Štajf	191
3	(Lithuania) Dominykas Butvilas	151
4	(Hungary) Tidor Érdi	73
5	(Estonia) Siim Plangi	63
6	(Russia) Alexey Lukyanuk	39

=== ERC-3 ===
Pos	Driver	Points
1	(Sweden) Emil Bergkvist	173
2	(Latvia) Ralfs Sirmacis	113
3	(Germany) Marijan Griebel	96
4	(United Kingdom) Chris Ingram	80
5	(Norway) Steve Røkland	79
6	(Poland) Aleks Zawada	64

=== ERC Junior ===
Pos	Driver	Points
1	(Sweden) Emil Bergkvist	147
2	(Latvia) Ralfs Sirmacis	104
3	(Germany) Marijan Griebel	93
4	(Norway) Steve Røkland	79
5	(United Kingdom) Chris Ingram	78
6	(Poland) Aleks Zawada	64

=== ERC Ladies ===
Pos	Driver	Points
1	(Bulgaria) Ekaterina Stratieva	6
2	(Czech Republic) Martina Daňhelová	3
3	(Ukraine) Inessa Tushkanova	3
