= List of female World Rally Championship drivers =

This is a list of women that have entered at least one World Rally Championship event. This list does not include co-drivers.

== All female WRC drivers ==
| Driver | First season | Final season | WRC rallies | Best WRC result | Notable achievements |
|---|---|---|---|---|---|
| (Sweden) Eva Adolfsson | 1985 | 1985 | 1 | DNF | |
| (France) Claudie Agostini | 1974 | 1974 | 1 | DNF | |
| (Finland) Kirsti Airikkala | 1975 | 1976 | 2 | 49th | |
| (United Kingdom) Louise Aitken-Walker | 1979 | 1991 | 22 | 10th | 1989 ERC Ladies Champion, 1990 WRC Ladies Cup Champion |
| (Italy) Caterina Alianello | 1998 | 1998 | 1 | DNF | |
| (Italy) Paola Alberi | 1984 | 1984 | 1 | 19th | |
| (Portugal) Lígia Albuquerque | 1998 | 1999 | 2 | 37th | |
| (Soviet Union) Ilona Ališauskienė | 1988 | 1988 | 1 | 76th | |
| (Jordan) Nancy Al-Majali | 2011 | 2011 | 1 | 22nd | - |
| (Turkey) Berna Aksoy | 2008 | 2008 | 1 | 35th | |
| (Finland) Merja Andersson | 1988 | 1988 | 1 | 58th | |
| (Poland) Enny Arianie | 1996 | 1997 | 2 | DNF | |
| (United Kingdom) Chrissie Ashford | 1976 | 1977 | 2 | DNF | |
| (Finland) Marianne Avomeri | 1974 | 1977 | 4 | 31st | |
| (Italy) Marcella Balestrieri | 1984 | 1984 | 1 | DNF | |
| (Spain) Ana Barbero | 1995 | 1995 | 1 | DNF | |
| (Portugal) Joana Barbosa | 2017 | 2018 | 2 | DNF | 2017 & 2018 Portuguese Ladies Champion |
| (Italy) Maurizia Baresi | 1973 | 1983 | 4 | 120th | |
| (New Zealand) Lee-Anne Barns | 2005 | 2005 | 1 | DNF | - |
| (United Kingdom) Natalie Barratt | 1998 | 2006 | 44 | 21st | - |
| Marie-France Bartoli | 1983 | 1983 | 1 | DNF | |
| (Belgium) Lyssia Baudet | 2024 | 2025 | 2 | 37th | 2024 Beyond Rally Women's Driver Development Programme finalist |
| (France) Anne Baverey | 1983 | 1983 | 1 | 132nd | |
| (Argentina) Dora Bavio | 1985 | 1990 | 2 | 39th | |
| (Belgium) Christine Beckers | 1977 | 1977 | 1 | DNF | 1967, 1968, 1969, 1970, 1972 and 1974 Belgian Racing Champion |
| (France) Patricia Bertapelle | 1989 | 1989 | 1 | 38th | |
| (France) Charlotte Berton | 2012 | 2012 | 1 | 48th | 2014 French Ladies Champion |
| (Italy) Serena Bianchi | 1991 | 1992 | 2 | DNF | |
| (Italy) Isabella Bignardi | 1982 | 1983 | 2 | 59th | |
| Marie-France Bizzari | 1979 | 1987 | 5 | DNF | |
| (Germany) Rena Blome | 1981 | 1982 | 4 | 46th | - |
| (Germany) Gisela Blume | 1981 | 1982 | 3 | 56th | |
| (United Kingdom) Francine Bogg | 1991 | 1991 | 1 | 68th | - |
| (France) Carolyn Boniface | 1988 | 1989 | 2 | DNF | |
| (Spain) Carina Boronat | 1991 | 1991 | 1 | 13th | |
| (France) Claudine Bouchet | 1973 | 1975 | 2 | 8th | |
| (United Kingdom) Mandy Bowman | 2005 | 2007 | 3 | 64th | |
| (United Kingdom) Phyllis Bown | 1993 | 1994 | 2 | 86th | |
| (Turkey) Nisa Bozkurt | 2005 | 2005 | 1 | 50th | |
| (Italy) Silvia “I.D.” Cailotto | 1990 | 1991 | 2 | DNF | |
| (Italy) Anna Cambiaghi | 1978 | 1989 | 5 | 56th | - |
| (France) Sylvie Cancellieri | 2008 | 2008 | 1 | DNF | - |
| (Italy) Marta Candian | 1999 | 2001 | 7 | 32nd | - |
| (Brazil) Maria Carmo Zacarias | 1981 | 1982 | 2 | 9th | |
| (France) Severine Carta | 2001 | 2001 | 1 | 50th | |
| (Italy) Elisabetta Cavenaghi | 1998 | 1998 | 1 | DNF | - |
| (Italy) Caterina Cecchini | 1998 | 1998 | 1 | 75th | |
| (Turkey) Burcu Çetinkaya | 2006 | 2024 | 16 | 12th | 2008 Fiesta Sporting Trophy Winner, 2017 Turkish Ladies Champion |
| (France) Joëlle Chardin-Hazard | 1976 | 1978 | 2 | DNF | |
| (France) "Marie-Claude Beaumont" Charmasson | 1973 | 1976 | 6 | DNF | |
| (United Kingdom) Rose-Anne Clinton | 1976 | 1976 | 1 | DNF | |
| (Australia) Denise Collins | 1993 | 1998 | 4 | 46th | |
| (United Kingdom) Louise Cook | 2012 | 2019 | 13 | 26th | 2010 & 2011 British Ladies Champion, 2012 WRC Production Car Cup 2WD Champion |
| (France) Martine Cordesse | 1975 | 1978 | 4 | 19th | |
| (Spain) Julià Cordoba | 1993 | 1997 | 3 | 34th | |
| (France) Christine Dacremont | 1973 | 1979 | 8 | 6th | |
| (France) Charlotte Dalmasso-Astier | 2013 | 2015 | 4 | 47th | 2016 French Ladies Champion |
| (Italy) Daniela Dal Col | 1998 | 1998 | 1 | DNF | |
| (Australia) Margaret Daniel | 1992 | 1992 | 1 | 59th | |
| (United Kingdom) Jenny Davies | 1998 | 1998 | 1 | 52nd | - |
| (France) Priscille De Belloy-Delecour | 1994 | 1999 | 7 | 31st | |
| (France) Sabrina De Castelli | 2008 | 2008 | 1 | 44th | |
| (France) Elisabeth De Fresquet | 1979 | 1994 | 16 | 28th | |
| (Italy) Paola de Martini | 1988 | 1990 | 15 | 9th | - |
| (France) Cécile de Montgolfier “Charlotte" | 1973 | 1974 | 2 | DNF | |
| (Denmark) Oda Dencker-Andersen | 1976 | 1977 | 2 | DNF | |
| (Germany) Janina Depping | 1997 | 2011 | 7 | 34th | - |
| (France) Marie-Odile Desvignes | 1976 | 1976 | 1 | DNF | |
| (Australia) Jacquiline Dines | 1989 | 2001 | 14 | 14th | |
| (France) Christine Driano | 1990 | 1993 | 11 | 13th | 1993 WRC Ladies Cup Champion |
| (United Kingdom) Geunda Eadie | 1979 | 1979 | 1 | DNF | |
| (United Kingdom) Janie Eaton | 1994 | 1997 | 3 | 87th | |
| (Finland) Carita Ekroos | 1979 | 1986 | 8 | 29th | |
| (United States) Keanna Erickson-Chang | 2019 | 2019 | 1 | 36th | - |
| (Sweden) Jonna Eson Brådhe | 2018 | 2018 | 1 | 47th | - |
| (Spain) Zihara Esteban | 2014 | 2017 | 2 | 46th | 2014 Spanish Ladies Champion |
| (Cameroon) Viviane Evina | 1990 | 1992 | 3 | 8th | |
| (Spain) Emma Falcón | 2013 | 2013 | 1 | DNF | 2013, 2016 & 2017 Spanish Ladies Champion, 2018 ERC Ladies Champion |
| (France) Sylvie Fascina | 1988 | 1988 | 1 | DNF | |
| (Germany) Jutta Fellbaum | 1976 | 1976 | 1 | 47th | |
| (Greece) Maria Flenga-Katsari | 1998 | 1998 | 1 | DNF | |
| (France) Marianne Fourton | 1973 | 1986 | 16 | 7th | |
| (Japan) Yoko Fukuzawa | 2004 | 2008 | 5 | 41st | |
| (Italy) Erika Gallina | 1998 | 1998 | 1 | DNF | |
| (Italy) Christine Giampaoli Zonca | 2016 | 2016 | 1 | 49th | - |
| (United Kingdom) Debbie Gilliver | 1997 | 1997 | 1 | DNF | |
| (New Zealand) Emma Gilmour | 2002 | 2012 | 12 | 14th | 2009 APRC Runner-Up |
| (Spain) Camara P. Gonzales | 1973 | 1973 | 1 | DNF | |
| (United Kingdom) Louise Goodman | 1999 | 1999 | 1 | 82nd | |
| (Finland) Marjo Götte | 1991 | 1991 | 1 | 66th | |
| (France) Dominique Grandvuinet-Perrier | 1982 | 1988 | 5 | DNF | |
| (Soviet Union) (Russia) Galina Grokhovskaya | 1989 | 1994 | 4 | 40th | |
| (Italy) M. Teresa Gugliemi | 1984 | 1985 | 2 | 31st | |
| (United Kingdom) Jane Gunningham | 1994 | 1997 | 2 | 68th | |
| (Australia) Fiona Hackett | 1993 | 1993 | 1 | DNF | |
| (United Kingdom) Gilly Handley | 1999 | 1999 | 1 | 52nd | |
| (Australia) Kim Harris | 1995 | 1999 | 4 | 32nd | |
| (United Kingdom) Kate Heath | 2006 | 2006 | 1 | 79th | |
| (United Kingdom) Sue Hedley | 1998 | 1998 | 1 | 81st | |
| (United Kingdom) Melissa Heijink | 1997 | 1997 | 1 | 88th | |
| (Finland) Eeva Heinonen | 1973 | 1974 | 3 | 18th | Finnish Ladies Rally Champion 1971-1974 |
| (Germany) Margot Henn | 1983 | 1983 | 1 | 117th | |
| (Germany) Hilde Henry | 1999 | 1999 | 1 | DNF | |
| (Germany) Christa Herrmann | 1975 | 1980 | 3 | DNF | |
| (Sweden) Jennie-Lee Hermansson | 1999 | 2007 | 2 | 63rd | |
| (Germany) Heidi Hetzer | 1973 | 1978 | 6 | 22nd | |
| (United Kingdom) Ruth Hillier | 1981 | 1983 | 2 | 62nd | |
| (Japan) Risa Hirayama | 2006 | 2007 | 2 | 59th | |
| (Sweden) Inge Hogman | 1973 | 1973 | 1 | DNF | |
| (Germany) Isolde Holderied | 1992 | 1999 | 24 | 8th | 1994 & 1995 WRC Ladies Cup Champion, 1992 ERC Group N Champion, 1992, 1993, 1996 & 1997 ERC Ladies Champion |
| (United Kingdom) Linda Hudspeth | 1978 | 1979 | 2 | DNF | |
| (United Kingdom) Lynda Hughes-Morgan | 1981 | 1991 | 8 | 12th | |
| (Sweden) Yvonne Hultgren | 1983 | 1991 | 3 | DNF | |
| (Austria) Gabriele Husar | 1986 | 1986 | 2 | DNF | |
| (Finland) Ele Hyrske | 1988 | 1988 | 1 | DNF | |
| (United Kingdom) Linda Jackson | 1973 | 1975 | 2 | 69th | |
| (France) Denise Jacques | 1988 | 1988 | 5 | 27th | |
| (Switzerland) Laurence Jacquet | 1991 | 1991 | 1 | 16th | 1991 Ladies French Rally Champion |
| (France) Laure Jaussaud | 2014 | 2020 | 6 | 32nd | - |
| (Poland) Janina Jedynak | 1978 | 1978 | 1 | DNF | |
| (United Kingdom) Elizabeth Jefferies | 1989 | 1989 | 1 | 84th | |
| (Norway) Trine Jensen | 1973 | 1977 | 8 | 20th | |
| (Sweden) Titti Jern | 1983 | 1983 | 1 | DNF | |
| (United Kingdom) Janet Jones | 1985 | 1985 | 1 | DNF | |
| (Finland) Eija Jurvanen | 1989 | 1994 | 12 | 15th | 1992 WRC Ladies Cup Champion |
| (Finland) Suvi Jyrkiäinen | 2024 | 2024 | 1 | DNF | 2024 Beyond Rally Women's Driver Development Programme finalist |
| (Sweden) Ramona Karlsson | 2008 | 2012 | 5 | 18th | - |
| (Turkey) Selay Kaya | 2008 | 2008 | 1 | DNF | |
| (Republic of Ireland) Toni Kelly | 2007 | 2009 | 2 | 21st | |
| (Sweden) Lisbeth Kerttu | 1992 | 1992 | 1 | 31st | |
| (New Zealand) Deborah Kibble | 1998 | 2002 | 5 | 33rd | |
| (United Kingdom) Becky Kirvan | 2011 | 2011 | 1 | 39th | - |
| (Argentina) Mari Klis | 1980 | 1984 | 4 | DNF | |
| (Norway) Wenche Knudsen / Wenche Knudtzen | 1973 | 1983 | 15 | 26th | |
| (Japan) Kumiko Koide | 2008 | 2010 | 2 | 39th | |
| (Japan) Tatsuo Koizumi | 1994 | 2005 | 4 | 44th | |
| (Ivory Coast) Salimata Koné | 1981 | 1981 | 1 | DNF | |
| (Finland) Marja-Liisa Korpi | 1978 | 1981 | 6 | 28th | Finnish Ladies Rally Champion 1978 |
| (Sweden) Susanne Kottulinsky | 1982 | 1987 | 10 | 13th | - |
| (Finland) Anne-Mari Kovalainen | 1999 | 2000 | 2 | 45th | |
| (Australia) Nicole Kyme | 1999 | 1999 | 1 | DNF | |
| (Kenya) Connie Kyriazi | 1993 | 1993 | 1 | DNF | |
| (Finland) Leena Kytömaa | 1993 | 1993 | 1 | DNF | |
| (Switzerland) Florence L'Huillier-Duez | 1989 | 1990 | 2 | 19th | 1990 Italian Ladies Rally Champion |
| (France) Sophie Laurent | 2015 | 2015 | 1 | 61st | 2015 French Ladies Champion |
| (United Kingdom) Sandy Lawson | 1973 | 1976 | 4 | 45th | |
| (Portugal) Joana Lemos | 1999 | 1999 | 1 | 53rd | |
| (United Kingdom) Helen Lepley | 1998 | 1998 | 1 | 68th | |
| (Finland) Minna Lindroos | 1998 | 2001 | 5 | 26th | |
| (Finland) Hannele Linnankoski | 1978 | 1978 | 1 | 36th | |
| (Kenya) Sati Lochab | 1991 | 1991 | 1 | DNF | |
| (Germany) Elke Maria Löhnerz | 1995 | 1995 | 1 | DNF | |
| (Germany) Ellen Lohr | 2007 | 2007 | 1 | DNF | |
| (Sweden) Birgitta Lundell | 1979 | 1979 | 1 | 61st | |
| (Sweden) Lotta Lundqvist | 1985 | 1989 | 6 | 18th | - |
| (Finland) Marjatta Mäkelä | 1973 | 1973 | 1 | 35th | |
| (United Kingdom) Penny Mallory | 1991 | 2000 | 6 | 34th | |
| (Italy) Antonella Mandelli | 1977 | 1978 | 3 | DNF | |
| (France) Michelle Masse | 1981 | 1981 | 1 | 34th | |
| (France) Patricia Masset | 1985 | 1985 | 1 | DNF | |
| (United Kingdom) Margaret Maundrell | 1994 | 1994 | 1 | 90th | |
| (Turkey) Zeynep Merkit | 2003 | 2003 | 1 | DNF | |
| (United Kingdom) Emma McKinstry | 2007 | 2007 | 1 | 35th | |
| (Kenya) Chrissie Michaelides | 1973 | 1973 | 1 | DNF | |
| Marie-France “Natacha” Millon | 1975 | 1984 | 13 | 16th | |
| (Italy) Tamara Molinaro | 2017 | 2019 | 3 | 27th | 2017 ERC Ladies Champion |
| (United States) Kathy Moore | 1986 | 1986 | 1 | DNF | |
| (France) Hermine Mordacq | 1987 | 1987 | 1 | 65th | |
| (United Kingdom) Pat Moss-Carlsson | 1973 | 1974 | 3 | 28th | 1958, 1960, 1962, 1964 & 1965 ERC Ladies Champion |
| (France) Michèle Mouton | 1974 | 1986 | 50 | 1st | 4 WRC Event Wins, 1977 ERC Runner-Up, 1982 WRC Runner-Up, 1986 German Rally Champion & 1985 Pikes Peak Winner |
| (Italy) Enrica Munaretto | 1992 | 2000 | 4 | 21st | |
| (United Kingdom) Catie Munnings | 2020 | 2020 | 1 | 41st | 2016 ERC Ladies Champion |
| (United Kingdom) Julie Murray | 1989 | 1990 | 2 | DNF | |
| (Finland) Lea Mustalahti | 1985 | 1985 | 1 | 72nd | |
| (United Kingdom) Jennifer Nadin-Birrell | 1973 | 1973 | 1 | DNF | |
| (Japan) Takako Nakano | 2004 | 2006 | 3 | 37th | |
| (France) Sandrine Nahon | 1990 | 1990 | 1 | 82nd | |
| (France) Carli Nardi | 1999 | 1999 | 1 | 72nd | |
| (Indonesia) Tina Natasya | 1997 | 1997 | 1 | DNF | |
| (United Kingdom) Jayne Neate-Wignall | 1979 | 1979 | 1 | 48th | |
| (New Zealand) Kirsty Nelson | 2006 | 2008 | 3 | 31st | |
| (France) Pascale Neyret | 1985 | 1990 | 10 | 19th | |
| (Finland) Mari Niinikoski | 1985 | 1985 | 1 | DNF | |
| (Finland) Mari Nikkara | 1982 | 1983 | 2 | 40th | |
| (Japan) Chiaki Ohmomo | 2004 | 2006 | 3 | 55th | |
| (Finland) Marketta Oksala | 1973 | 1978 | 10 | 17th | Finnish Ladies Rally Champion 1975-1977 |
| (Japan) Kozue Oi | 2000 | 2007 | 6 | 38th | |
| (France) Ghislain Olive | 1975 | 1980 | 6 | 93rd | |
| (Romania) Cristiana Oprea | 2022 | 2022 | 1 | 56th | - |
| (United Kingdom) Sue Orchard | 1991 | 1991 | 1 | 82nd | |
| (Sweden) Sylvia Österberg | 1973 | 1973 | 1 | 28th | |
| (France) Marie-Cécile Oudry | 1995 | 1995 | 1 | DNF | |
| (Finland) Jaana Pajula-Ihaksi | 1987 | 1988 | 2 | 46th | |
| (Finland) Sinikka Palmuaro | 1977 | 1977 | 1 | 43rd | |
| (United Kingdom) Lisa Parish | 1997 | 2000 | 3 | 91st | |
| (Finland) Sinikka Parkkinen | 1977 | 1987 | 9 | 34th | |
| (Italy) Francesca Patrese | 1998 | 1998 | 1 | 72nd | |
| (France) Anne-Chantal Pauwels | 1990 | 1990 | 1 | DNF | |
| (United Kingdom) Kathy Pegrum | 1974 | 1975 | 2 | 74th | |
| (Australia) Kirsty Percival-Moore | 1998 | 1998 | 1 | 58th | |
| (Italy) Myriam Peretti | 2021 | 2021 | 2 | 53rd | - |
| (Italy) Patrizia Perosino | 2021 | 2021 | 1 | 52nd | 2020 Italian Ladies Champion |
| (Italy) Gianandrea Pescali | 1998 | 1998 | 1 | DNF | |
| (Germany) Monika Petzold | 1993 | 1994 | 2 | 73rd | |
| (Italy) Serena Pittoni | 1973 | 1973 | 1 | 42nd | - |
| (Belgium) Marie-Françoise Placq | 1983 | 1983 | 1 | 130th | |
| (France) Lilian Polge | 1976 | 2000 | 12 | 50th | |
| (Italy) Fabrizia Pons | 1976 | 1978 | 3 | 9th | |
| (France) Karine Puech | 1999 | 1999 | 1 | 78th | |
| (Canada) Nicole Quimet | 1978 | 1979 | 2 | 9th | |
| (Finland) Laura Rämänen | 1998 | 1998 | 1 | 54th | |
| (France) Martine “Tintin” Renier | 1975 | 1975 | 1 | DNF | |
| (France) Kathia Renucci | 2018 | 2018 | 1 | 61st | - |
| (Italy) Pierangela Riva | 1984 | 1987 | 2 | 24th | |
| (United Kingdom) Jill Robinson | 1973 | 1978 | 8 | 28th | |
| (Italy) Roberta Rossi | 1995 | 1998 | 2 | 40th | |
| (Italy) Gisella Rovegno | 1999 | 2001 | 5 | 54th | |
| (Spain) Maria José Ruedas | 1977 | 1977 | 1 | DNF | |
| (France) Sarah Rumeau | 2025 | 2025 | 1 | 20th | 2021, 22 & 24 French Ladies Rally Champion |
| (Sweden) Heidi Ryrlén | 2018 | 2018 | 1 | 55th | - |
| (France) Laura Salini | 2016 | 2016 | 1 | 39th | - |
| (Finland) Marjo Salonen | 1984 | 1988 | 5 | 55th | |
| (Portugal) Paula Santos | 1995 | 1999 | 2 | DNF | |
| (Italy) Anna Sassonia | 1998 | 1998 | 1 | 64th | |
| (Japan) Naru Sato | 2010 | 2012 | 2 | 34th | |
| (Italy) Gabriella Scagnetti | 1993 | 1993 | 1 | 82nd | |
| (France) Lilian Schlosser | 2018 | 2018 | 1 | DNF | - |
| (Germany) Claire Schönborn | 2024 | 2025 | 2 | 33rd | 2024 Beyond Rally Women's Driver Development Programme finalist |
| (Austria) Andrée Schörghofer | 1981 | 1982 | 3 | DNF | |
| (Italy) Patrizia Sciascia | 1996 | 2000 | 5 | 32nd | 2006 Italian Ladies Rally Champion |
| (Italy) Ilaria Serra | 1994 | 1994 | 1 | DNF | |
| (Kenya) Chuni Shah | 1982 | 1983 | 2 | DNF | |
| (United Kingdom) Sabrina Shaw | 1998 | 2000 | 3 | 25th | |
| (United Kingdom) Stephanie Simmonite | 1994 | 1997 | 3 | 19th | British Ladies Rally Champion 1995-1997 |
| (United Kingdom) Judy Simpson | 1978 | 1979 | 2 | 60th | |
| (Finland) Minna Sillankorva | 1982 | 1996 | 18 | 10th | 1991 WRC Ladies Cup Champion |
| (Hungary) Mária Radóné Sisák | 2000 | 2000 | 1 | DNF | |
| (New Zealand) Vanessa Slee-Evans | 1990 | 1999 | 7 | 28th | |
| (United Kingdom) Lorna Smith | 2004 | 2007 | 3 | 38th | 2004 Ladies British Rally Champion |
| (Republic of Ireland) Rosemary Smith | 1973 | 1974 | 3 | 16th | |
| (Kenya) Sue Smith | 1989 | 1989 | 1 | DNF | |
| (Belgium) Nicole Sol | 1983 | 1983 | 1 | DNF | |
| (Italy) Rachele Somaschini | 2019 | 2025 | 7 | 32nd | 2022 & 2023 TER Ladies Champion, 2021, 2023 & 2024 Italian Ladies Champion |
| (Portugal) Manuela Souto | 1981 | 1981 | 1 | DNF | |
| (Greece) Christina-Myrto Stathaki | 1999 | 2007 | 7 | 46th | |
| (New Zealand) Nakita Stevenson | 2006 | 2006 | 1 | 36th | |
| (Bulgaria) Ekaterina Stratieva | 2010 | 2010 | 1 | DNF | 2014, 2015 & 2019 ERC Ladies Champion, 2021 Bulgarian Ladies Champion |
| (United Kingdom) Nina Sutcliffe | 1987 | 1989 | 2 | 75th | |
| (Japan) Ayako Suzuki | 1997 | 1998 | 2 | DNF | |
| (Norway) Ann Taieth | 1973 | 1984 | 7 | DNF | |
| (United Kingdom) Anna Tait (Imrie) | 1997 | 1998 | 2 | DNF | |
| (Spain) Anna Tallada Bayot | 2018 | 2018 | 1 | 51st | - |
| (Norway) Randi Tangeland | 1975 | 1977 | 3 | 56th | |
| (France) Corinne Tarnaud | 1976 | 1976 | 1 | 42nd | |
| (Italy) Prisca Taruffi | 1988 | 1989 | 2 | DNF | |
| (United Kingdom) Shelly Taunt | 1995 | 1995 | 1 | DNF | |
| (Australia) Molly Taylor | 2011 | 2021 | 17 | 13th | 2013 ERC Ladies Champion, 2016 Australian Rally Champion |
| (United Kingdom) Nabila Tejpar | 2017 | 2019 | 7 | 31st | 2017 British Ladies Champion |
| (Finland) Tiina Tikkinen | 1988 | 1989 | 2 | 64th | |
| (Italy) Giusy Tocco | 1999 | 1999 | 1 | 43rd | |
| (Finland) Kirsti Torvinen | 1973 | 1973 | 1 | 40th | |
| (France) Michèle Vallet | 1977 | 1979 | 3 | 71st | |
| (Netherlands) Noortje van Gennip | 2004 | 2004 | 1 | 42nd | |
| (Kenya) Michelle van Tongeren | 1999 | 2002 | 4 | 15th | |
| (Finland) Leena Vanha-Jaakkola | 1989 | 1989 | 1 | 64th | |
| (France) Yveline Vanoni | 1975 | 1975 | 1 | DNF | |
| (Iran) Zohreh Vatankhah | 2008 | 2008 | 1 | 37th | |
| (Greece) Eni Vei-Seferli | 1975 | 1982 | 8 | 25th | |
| (Portugal) Paula Veloso Amaral | 1992 | 1998 | 4 | DNF | |
| (France) Carole Vergnaud | 1985 | 1988 | 12 | 24th | |
| (France) Anny-Charlotte Verney | 1976 | 1979 | 4 | 99th | |
| (Switzerland) Mireille Vidueira | 2024 | 2024 | 1 | 29th | 2023 French Ladies Champion |
| (Finland) Anne Vuorio | 1986 | 1990 | 3 | 39th | |
| (Kenya) Maxime Wahome | 2022 | 2022 | 1 | 17th | - |
| (Sweden) Pernilla Walfridsson-Solberg | 1997 | 2000 | 14 | 21st | 2000 Norwegian Group N Champion |
| (Germany) Eve Wallenwein | 2013 | 2016 | 3 | 51st | - |
| (United Kingdom) Sue Warrell | 1976 | 1976 | 1 | DNF | |
| (Austria) Ingrid Weber | 1973 | 1974 | 2 | 36th | |
| (Italy) Patrizia Weber | 1987 | 1987 | 1 | 50th | |
| (United Kingdom) Myra Webster | 1982 | 1983 | 2 | 63rd | |
| (Germany) Edith Weiss | 2001 | 2017 | 8 | 29th | - |
| (Germany) Tina Wiegand | 2013 | 2014 | 2 | 48th | - |
| (United Kingdom) Sara Williams | 2014 | 2014 | 1 | 43rd | - |
| (Germany) Waltraud Wünsch | 1981 | 1983 | 5 | 48th | |
| (Japan) Atsumi Yoshida | 1990 | 1992 | 4 | 25th | |
| (Qatar) Nada Zaidan | 2010 | 2010 | 1 | 27th | |
| (Italy) Luisa Zumelli | 1990 | 1998 | 7 | 23rd | |

== See also ==
- List of World Rally Championship drivers
