= Cristiana Oprea =

Rally driver

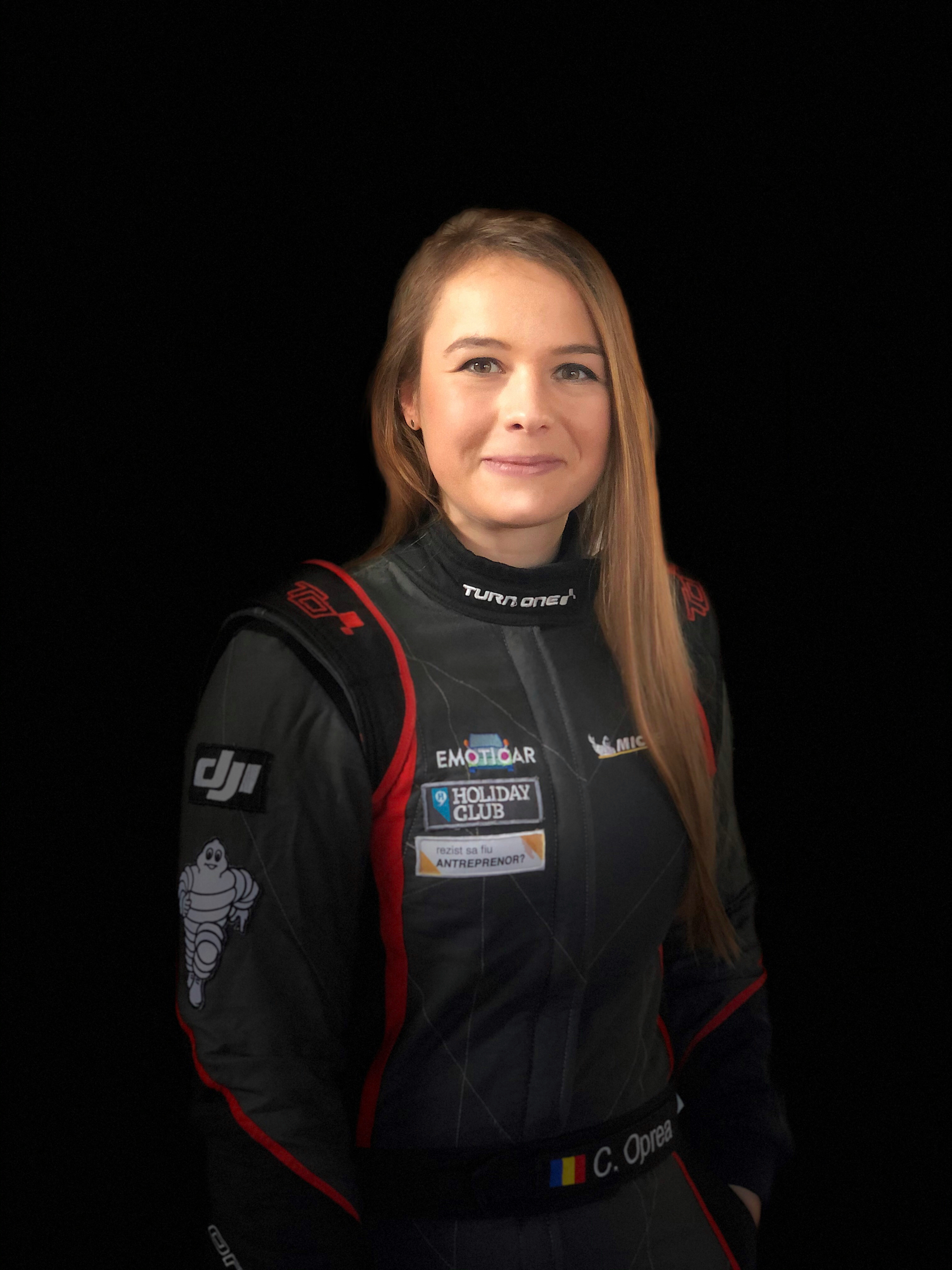
- Cristiana Oprea, 2022

Personal information
- Nationality: (Romania) Romanian
- Born: 11 March 1992 (age 34); București, Romania

World Rally Championship record
- Co-driver: Andrei Mitrașcă
- Rallies: 1
- First rally: 2022 Croatia Rally
- Last rally: 2022 Croatia Rally

European Rally Championship
- Years active: 2019 - present
- Co-driver: Diana Hațegan (2019), Alexia Parteni (2022-present)
- Starts: 5
- Wins: Maximum points in ERC Ladies Trophy at Rally di Roma Capitale 2019
- Podiums: 1

Cupa Dacia Romanian National Rally Championship
- Years active: 2015-2020
- Co-driver: Ioana Stan (2017), Diana Hațegan (2018-2020)
- Starts: 44
- Podiums: 1 - P2 Dacia Cup at Argeș Rally 2019
- Best finish: P5 overall in Dacia Cup in 2018

Cristiana Oprea (born 11 March 1992) is a Romanian rally driver. She currently competes in the FIA ERC European Rally Championship 2024. Cristiana is the first Romanian woman driver to ever compete in the World Rally Championship and European Rally Championship. Her career in rallying started in 2015, first as a codriver next to George Grigorescu, then as a driver in DACIA Cup, driving a Dacia Sandero 0.9 TCe.

Oprea previously competed in the Romanian National Rally Championship and in the European Rally Championship. In July 2018, she and codriver Diana Hațegan became the first Romanian female rally crew in the last 50 years to compete in a foreign rally (Rally Sliven, Bulgaria, a FIA European Rally Trophy event).

In July 2019, Oprea and codriver Diana Hațegan became the first ladies crew to ever represent Romania in the FIA ERC European Rally Championship, at Rally di Roma Capitale, where they gained maximum points in the ERC Ladies Trophy standings driving a Peugeot 208 R2.

In April 2022, Oprea made her WRC debut at 2022 Croatia Rally and became the first Romanian woman driver to ever compete in the World Rally Championship.

In 2022 and 2023, Oprea competed in ADAC Opel Electric Rally Cup, the first electric rally championship in the world, promoting electric mobility, innovation and sustainability through motorsport.

== Biography ==
=== Studies, career and motorsport debut ===
Oprea is a double graduate of the "Ion Mincu" University of Architecture and Urbanism in Bucharest. She studied Urban Planning (2010-2014) and Architecture (2011-2017), but she never worked in the field, wanting to follow her passion for cars. In 2015, she was for a short while the PR of the Romanian Motorsport Federation, when she first took contact with the motorsport world. Her career in rallying started in 2015, first as a codriver next to George Grigorescu, Master of Sport and founder of the DACIA Cup series, then as a driver in DACIA Cup, driving a Dacia Sandero 0.9 TCe.

==== Motorsport Excellence Centre Bucharest ====
In 2017, Oprea created the concept for a Motorsport Excellence Centre in Bucharest as an architecture graduation project.

=== Racing career ===
Oprea competed two full seasons (2017 - 2018) in DACIA Cup, part of the Romanian National Rally Championship. Her rookie season was 2017, when she completed seven events driving a Dacia Sandero 0.9 TCe with Ioana Stan as a codriver. They finished on sixth place out of nine rookie crews and on 12th place out of 18 crews enlisted overall in DACIA Cup. In 2018, she finished on the fifth place overall in DACIA Cup, marking the best result of a woman driver since 2007, when Alina Bunica competed.

Oprea first stepped on a podium at the beginning of 2019 season at Argeș Rally, when together with codriver Diana Hațegan took second place overall in DACIA Cup.

In July 2019, Oprea and codriver Diana Hațegan became the first ladies crew to ever represent Romania in the FIA ERC European Rally Championship, at Rally di Roma Capitale, where they finished eighth in the highly competitive ERC3 class and gained maximum points in the ERC Ladies Trophy standings.

In April 2022, Oprea and codriver Andrei Mitrașcă competed in the World Rally Championship at 2022 Croatia Rally.

In 2022 and 2023, Oprea competed with an all-electric rally car in ADAC Opel Electric Rally Cup, the first electric rally championship in the world, promoting electric mobility, innovation and sustainability through motorsport. Oprea also competed in several FIA ERC events.

In 2024, Oprea competed in the 2024 FIA ERC European Rally Championship with an Opel Corsa Rally4.

=== Romanian Women in Motorsport platform ===
Oprea is the founder and administrator of "Femei în Motorsport", a platform dedicated to promoting all women involved in Romanian motorsport, following the Women in Motorsport concept as defined by FIA.
