= Grigor Grigorov =

Bulgarian chess grandmaster (born 1987)

Personal information
- Native name: Григор Гошев Григоров
- Born: 26 May 1987 (age 39) Petrich, Bulgaria

Chess career
- Country: Bulgaria
- Title: Grandmaster (2011)
- FIDE rating: 2496 (November 2026)
- Peak rating: 2516 (March 2013)

Grigor Grigorov (Bulgarian: Григор Гошев Григоров; born 26 May 1987 in Petrich) is a Bulgarian chess Grandmaster (2011).

== Chess career ==
He has repeatedly represented Bulgaria at the World Youth Chess Championship and European Youth Chess Championship in various age categories. He was also a medalist at the Bulgarian Youth Chess Championship, winning silver in 2004 (in the under-14 category). He achieved his Grandmaster norms in 2007 (in Galați, sharing 2nd place behind Vlad-Cristian Jianu), 2008 (during the French Team Chess Championship), and 2010 (in Bansko, finishing 3rd behind Avetik Grigoryan and Tamir Nabaty).

In 2009, he shared 2nd place (behind Marcos Llaneza Vega, alongside, among others, Levan Aroshidze and Alin Berescu) in Thessaloniki, won (together with Valentin Yotov, Momchil Nikolov, and Liuben Spassov) the Nino Kirov Memorial held in Sofia, and took 1st place in a Swiss-system tournament in Satu Mare. In 2010, he shared 1st place (together with Kiril Georgiev, Marijan Petrov, Evgeni Janev, and Petar Drenchev) in Blagoevgrad (at the subsequent Nino Kirov Memorial).

He reached his highest career Elo rating on 1 March 2013, achieving 2,516 points and ranking 15th among Bulgarian chess players at that time.

== Sources ==
- Title Applications (GM): Grigorov, Grigor
- Григор Григоров (pp. 141–142) (in Bulgarian)
