= Ekaterina Stratieva =

Bulgarian Rally Driver

Personal information
- Nationality: (Bulgaria) Bulgarian
- Born: October 5, 1982 (age 44)

World Rally Championship record
- Years active: 2010
- Rallies: 1
- Championships: 0
- Rally wins: 0
- Podiums: 0
- Stage wins: 0
- Total points: 0
- First rally: 2010 Rally Bulgaria
- Last rally: 2010 Rally Bulgaria

Ekaterina Stratieva (Bulgarian: Екатерина Стратиева; born 5 October 1982) is a rally driver from Bulgaria who competed in WRC Rally Bulgaria 2010. In 2014, 2015 and 2019 she was European Ladies Rally Champion.

Her co-driver in 2015 was Yulianna Nyirfas. In 2024, her co-driver is Schoro.

== See also ==
List of female World Rally Championship drivers
