= 2022 World Rally Championship =

50th running of the World Rally Championship

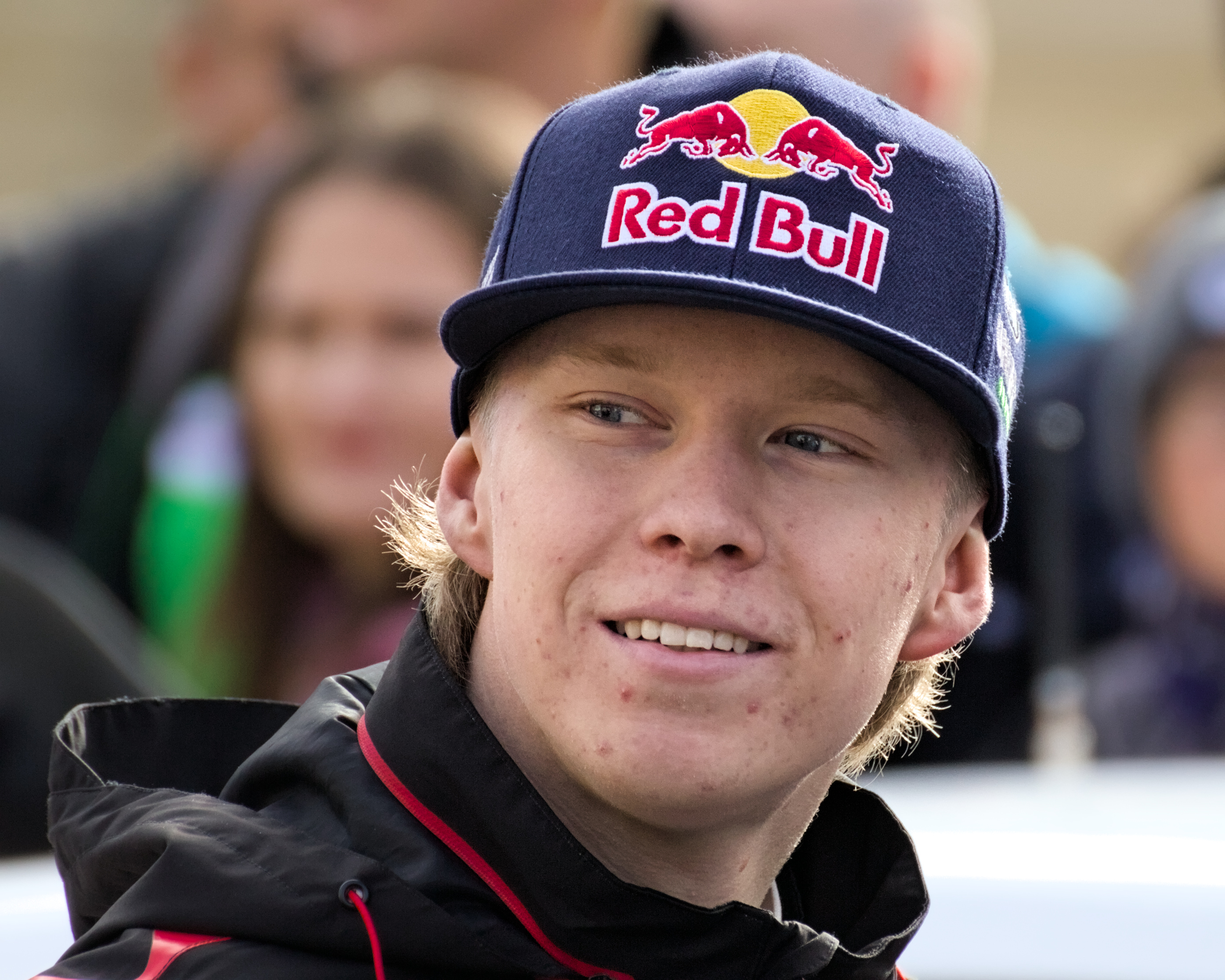
Kalle Rovanperä won his first drivers' championship title.

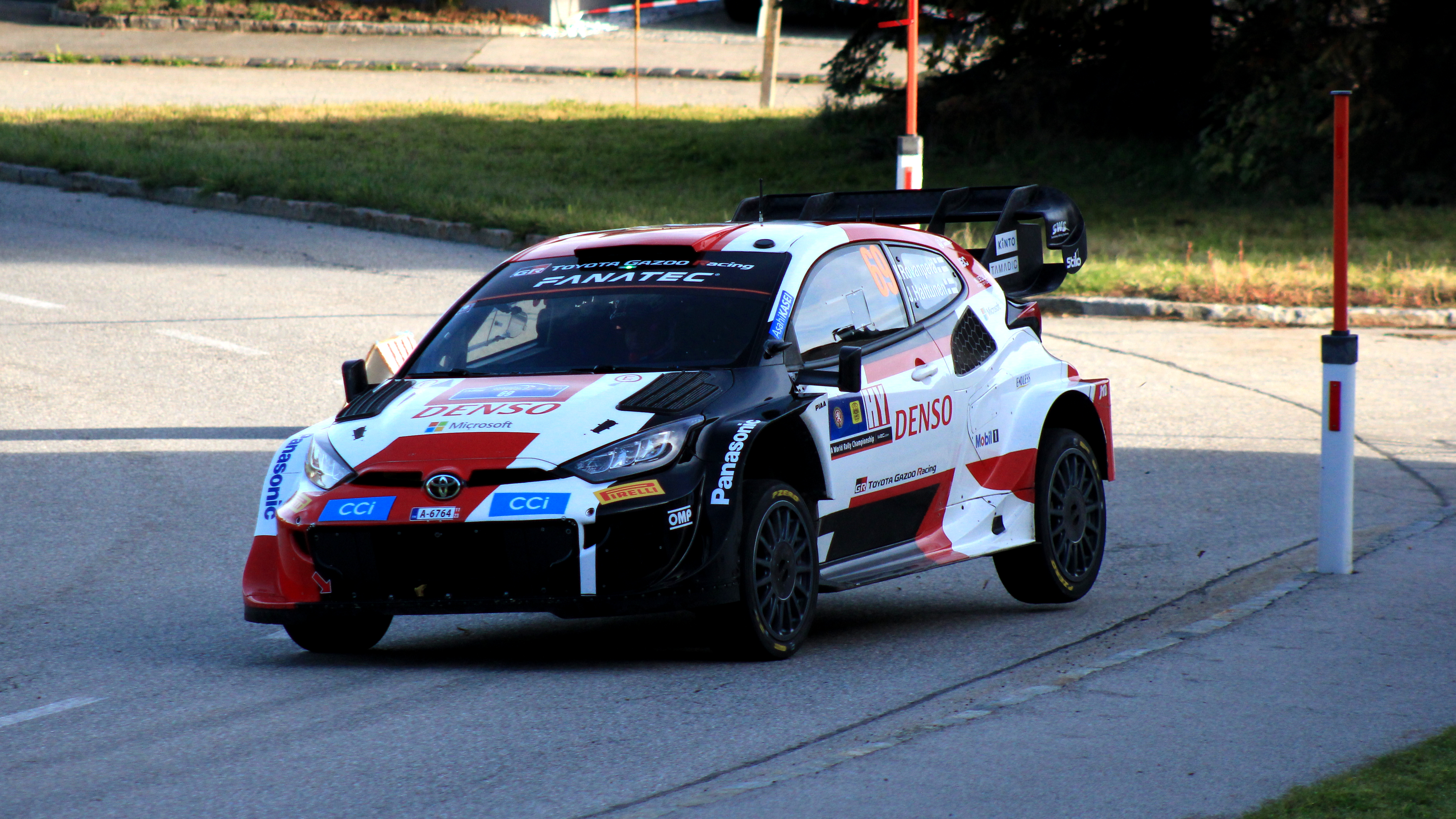
Toyota Gazoo Racing WRT (GR Yaris Rally1 pictured) were the manufacturers' champions.

The 2022 FIA World Rally Championship was the 50th season of the World Rally Championship (WRC), an international rallying series organised by the Fédération Internationale de l'Automobile (FIA). Teams and crews competed for the World Rally Championships for Drivers, Co-drivers and Manufacturers; each won by Kalle Rovanperä, Jonne Halttunen and Toyota Gazoo Racing WRT.

Crews were free to compete in cars complying with Groups Rally1 to Rally5 regulations; however, only manufacturers competing with Rally1 cars homologated under radically new regulations were eligible to score points in the manufacturers' championship. The championship began in January 2022 with the Rallye Monte-Carlo and concluded in November 2022 with Rally Japan. The series was supported by WRC2 and WRC3 at every round of the championship with the junior category at selected events.

Sébastien Ogier and Julien Ingrassia were the reigning drivers' and co-drivers' champions, having secured their eighth championship titles at the 2021 Rally Monza. However, Ingrassia did not defend his title as he retired from competition at the end of 2021 season. Toyota were the defending manufacturers' champions.

Rovanperä and Halttunen won their first World Rally Championship titles after winning the 2022 Rally New Zealand. At the age of twenty-two, Rovanperä became the youngest ever World Rally Champion. At the conclusion of the championship, Ott Tänak and Martin Järveoja finished second, trailing by fifty points. Thierry Neuville and Martijn Wydaeghe were third, a further twelve points behind. In the manufacturers' championship, Toyota Gazoo Racing WRT successfully defended their title at the 2022 Rally Catalunya, a seventy-point lead over Hyundai Shell Mobis WRT, with M-Sport Ford WRT in third.

== Calendar ==
A map showing the locations of the rallies of the 2022 championship. Event headquarters are marked with black dots.

The 2022 season was contested over thirteen rounds across Europe, Africa, Oceania, and Asia.

| Round | Start date | Finish date | Rally | Rally headquarters | Surface | Stages | Distance | Ref. |
|---|---|---|---|---|---|---|---|---|
| 1 | 20 January | 23 January | (Monaco) Rallye Automobile Monte Carlo | Monte Carlo, Monaco | Mixed (Note: The Monte Carlo Rally is run on a tarmac and snow surface.) | 17 | 296.03 km | |
| 2 | 24 February | 27 February | Rally Sweden | Umeå, Västerbotten County | Snow | 17 | 264.81 km | |
| 3 | 21 April | 24 April | Croatia Rally | Zagreb | Tarmac | 20 | 291.84 km | |
| 4 | 19 May | 22 May | Rally de Portugal | Matosinhos, Porto | Gravel | 21 | 338.34 km | |
| 5 | 2 June | 5 June | (Italy) Rally Italia Sardegna | Alghero, Sardinia | Gravel | 21 | 307.91 km | |
| 6 | 23 June | 26 June | Safari Rally Kenya | Nairobi | Gravel | 19 | 363.44 km | |
| 7 | 14 July | 17 July | Rally Estonia | Tartu, Tartu County | Gravel | 24 | 314.26 km | |
| 8 | 4 August | 7 August | Rally Finland | Jyväskylä, Central Finland | Gravel | 22 | 322.61 km | |
| 9 | 18 August | 21 August | Ypres Rally Belgium | Ypres, West Flanders | Tarmac | 20 | 281.58 km | |
| 10 | 8 September | 11 September | Acropolis Rally Greece | Lamia, Central Greece | Gravel | 16 | 303.30 km | |
| 11 | 29 September | 2 October | Rally New Zealand | Auckland, North Island | Gravel | 17 | 279.80 km | |
| 12 | 20 October | 23 October | (Spain) RACC Rally Catalunya de España | Salou, Catalonia | Tarmac | 19 | 293.77 km | |
| 13 | 10 November | 13 November | Rally Japan | Toyota, Chūbu region | Tarmac | 19 | 283.27 km | |

=== Location changes ===
The headquarters of the Monte Carlo Rally moved from Gap, Hautes-Alpes to Monaco alone. The rally was previously headquartered solely in Monaco in 2006. Rally Sweden returned to the championship after a one-year absence. Because of a lack of snow, the organisers moved the rally headquarters for the first time in WRC history. It relocated from Torsby, Värmland northwards to Umeå in Västerbotten County. The rally was initially scheduled to cover 303.74 km (188.7 mi) in nineteen special stages, but it was reduced to seventeen in a total of 264.81 km (164.5 mi) due to reindeer movements. Rally Italia Sardegna relocated its rally base back to Alghero following a one-off headquarter in Olbia for the 2021 event.

=== Calendar changes ===
Rally New Zealand returned to the championship for the first time since 2012. The rally had also secured a spot in the calendar in 2020, but the event was not held in response to the COVID-19 pandemic. Rally Japan took the final spot in the calendar. It was scheduled as the final round in 2020 and 2021, before being called off due to the COVID-19 pandemic. Rally Mexico had contracts to hold the WRC event in 2022 and 2023, but the rally was not included on the calendar. A national event was held in the bid of a 2023 return. Rally Chile found itself in a similar situation to Mexico as their contract with WRC Promoter GmbH lasted till 2022. Chile had previously hosted the event in 2019. Rally GB was bidding for a 2022 return as the event was planned to hold in Northern Ireland, but the proposal was ultimately failed.

== Entrants ==
The following teams, drivers and co-drivers contested the 2022 World Championship under Rally1 regulations. All crews use tyres provided by Pirelli.

Rally1 entries eligible to score manufacturer points
| Manufacturer | Entrant | Car | No. | Driver name | Co-driver name | Rounds |
|---|---|---|---|---|---|---|
| Ford | (United Kingdom) M-Sport Ford WRT | Ford Puma Rally1 | 16 | (France) Adrien Fourmaux | (France) Alexandre Coria | All |
| Ford | (United Kingdom) M-Sport Ford WRT | Ford Puma Rally1 | 19 | (France) Sébastien Loeb | (France) Isabelle Galmiche | 1, 4, 6, 10 |
| Ford | (United Kingdom) M-Sport Ford WRT | Ford Puma Rally1 | 42 | (Republic of Ireland) Craig Breen | (Republic of Ireland) Paul Nagle | 1–12 |
| Ford | (United Kingdom) M-Sport Ford WRT | Ford Puma Rally1 | 42 | (Republic of Ireland) Craig Breen | (Republic of Ireland) James Fulton | 13 |
| Ford | (United Kingdom) M-Sport Ford WRT | Ford Puma Rally1 | 44 | (United Kingdom) Gus Greensmith | (Sweden) Jonas Andersson | 2–3, 5, 7–13 |
| Hyundai | (South Korea) Hyundai Shell Mobis WRT | Hyundai i20 N Rally1 | 2 | (Sweden) Oliver Solberg | (United Kingdom) Elliott Edmondson | 1–3, 6–9, 11 |
| Hyundai | (South Korea) Hyundai Shell Mobis WRT | Hyundai i20 N Rally1 | 6 | (Spain) Dani Sordo | (Spain) Cándido Carrera | 4–5, 10, 12–13 |
| Hyundai | (South Korea) Hyundai Shell Mobis WRT | Hyundai i20 N Rally1 | 8 | (Estonia) Ott Tänak | (Estonia) Martin Järveoja | All |
| Hyundai | (South Korea) Hyundai Shell Mobis WRT | Hyundai i20 N Rally1 | 11 | (Belgium) Thierry Neuville | (Belgium) Martijn Wydaeghe | All |
| Toyota | (Japan) Toyota Gazoo Racing WRT | Toyota GR Yaris Rally1 | 1 | (France) Sébastien Ogier | (France) Benjamin Veillas | 1, 4, 6, 11–12 |
| Toyota | (Japan) Toyota Gazoo Racing WRT | Toyota GR Yaris Rally1 | 1 | (France) Sébastien Ogier | (France) Vincent Landais | 13 |
| Toyota | (Japan) Toyota Gazoo Racing WRT | Toyota GR Yaris Rally1 | 4 | (Finland) Esapekka Lappi | (Finland) Janne Ferm | 2–3, 5, 7–10 |
| Toyota | (Japan) Toyota Gazoo Racing WRT | Toyota GR Yaris Rally1 | 33 | (United Kingdom) Elfyn Evans | (United Kingdom) Scott Martin | All |
| Toyota | (Japan) Toyota Gazoo Racing WRT | Toyota GR Yaris Rally1 | 69 | (Finland) Kalle Rovanperä | (Finland) Jonne Halttunen | All |
| Toyota | (Japan) Toyota Gazoo Racing WRT NG | Toyota GR Yaris Rally1 | 18 | (Japan) Takamoto Katsuta | (Republic of Ireland) Aaron Johnston | All |

The below crews were not entered to score manufacturer points and were entered in Rally1 cars as privateers or under arrangement with the manufacturers.

Rally1 entries ineligible to score manufacturer points
| Manufacturer | Entrant | Car | No. | Driver name | Co-driver name | Rounds |
|---|---|---|---|---|---|---|
| Ford | (United Kingdom) M-Sport Ford WRT | Ford Puma Rally1 | 7 | (France) Pierre-Louis Loubet | (France) Vincent Landais | 3–5, 7–8, 10, 12 |
| Ford | (United Kingdom) M-Sport Ford WRT | Ford Puma Rally1 | 9 | (Greece) Jourdan Serderidis | (Belgium) Frédéric Miclotte | 6, 10, 12–13 |
| Ford | (United Kingdom) M-Sport Ford WRT | Ford Puma Rally1 | 37 | (Italy) Lorenzo Bertelli | (Italy) Simone Scattolin | 2 |
| Ford | (United Kingdom) M-Sport Ford WRT | Ford Puma Rally1 | 37 | (Italy) Lorenzo Bertelli | (Italy) Lorenzo Granai | 11 |
| Ford | (United Kingdom) M-Sport Ford WRT | Ford Puma Rally1 | 44 | (United Kingdom) Gus Greensmith | (Sweden) Jonas Andersson | 1, 4, 6 |
| Ford | (United Kingdom) M-Sport Ford WRT | Ford Puma Rally1 | 68 | (Finland) Jari Huttunen | (Finland) Mikko Lukka | 8 |

=== Team changes ===
All three constructors entered the championship with brand new cars:

- M-Sport entered the championship with a new car based on the Ford Puma crossover, named Ford Puma Rally1.
- Hyundai switched the i20 Coupé platform for the i20 N to race with.
- Toyota also replaced the third-gen Toyota Yaris for the GR Yaris.

For the first three years life-cycle of Rally1 regulations, they would keep the Global Race Engine architecture (Inline 4-cylinder, 1.6 litre, direct injection turbo).

=== Driver changes ===
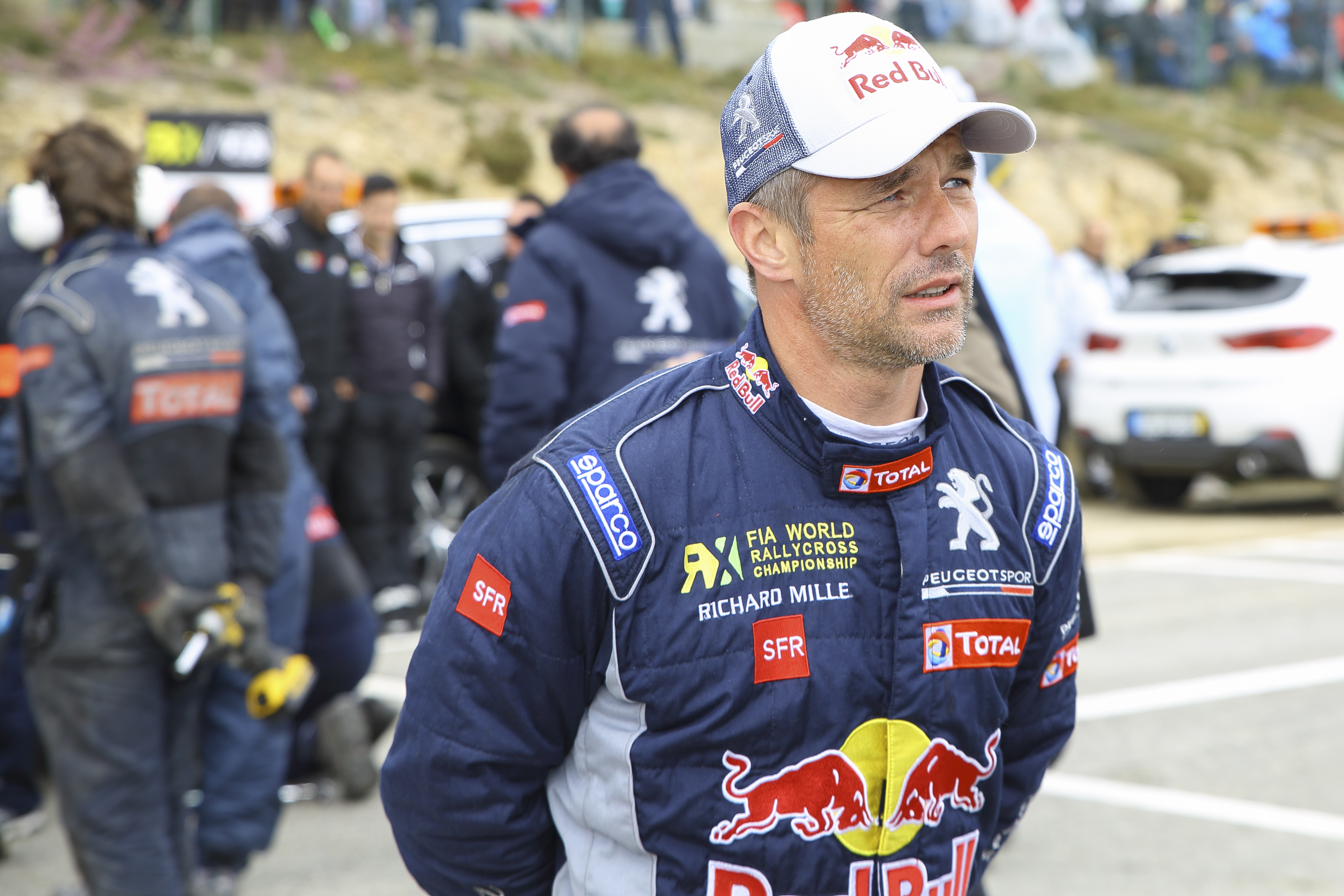
Nine-time world champion Sébastien Loeb returned to the World Rally Championship with M-Sport.

M-Sport expanded their programme from two regular crews to three full-time entries. The British team was led by Craig Breen and Paul Nagle, who signed a two-year full-time contract. However, Breen and Nagle parted away as Nagle announced his retirement from full-time competition after the 2022 Rally Catalunya. James Fulton joined alongside Breen from the 2022 Rally Japan onwards. Gus Greensmith remained with the team and would again contest a full campaign. He was co-driven by Jonas Andersson. Adrien Fourmaux and Alexandre Coria were also retained with the team. Nine-time World Champion Sébastien Loeb joined the team with new co-driver Isabelle Galmiche to compete at selected events. Extra cars also entered at selected events, sharing-driven by the crew led by Lorenzo Bertelli and Pierre-Louis Loubet, who was confirmed to be co-driven once again with Vincent Landais. M-Sport long-time customer Jourdan Serderidis, who became the first privateer to buy a Rally1 car, also shared the seat.

Hyundai retained the crew of Ott Tänak and Martin Järveoja and of Thierry Neuville and Martijn Wydaeghe as their two full-time competitors. Oliver Solberg stepped up into the Hyundai manufacturer team to share the third car with the crew led by Dani Sordo. Andrea Adamo left his role as team principal. Solberg's program came to a halt after the 2022 Rally New Zealand due to a series of inconsistent performances.

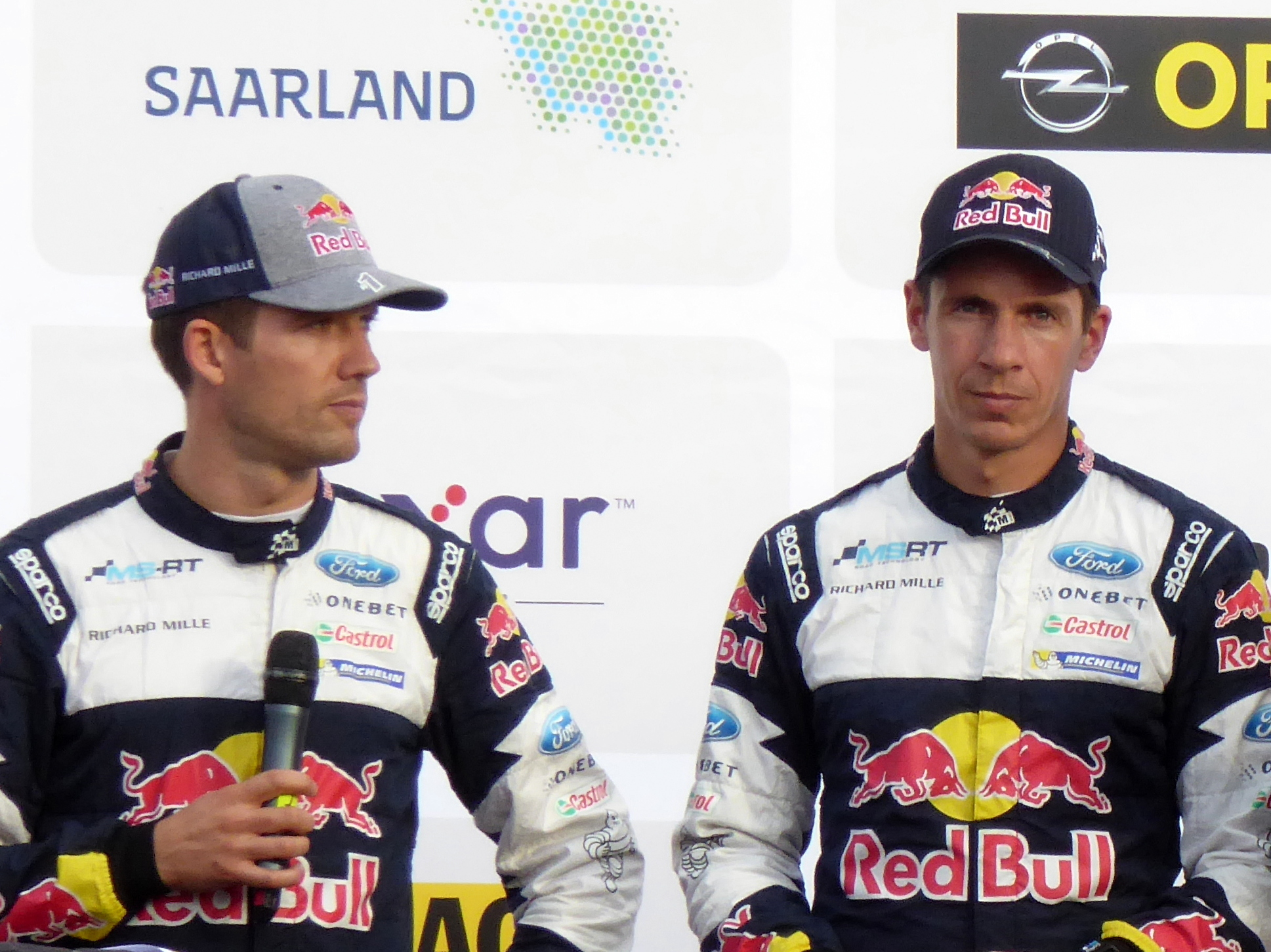
Sébastien Ogier (left) would only contest selected events, while his former co-driver Julien Ingrassia (right) retired from competition following the 2021 season.

Toyota renewed contracts with the crew of Elfyn Evans and Scott Martin and of Kalle Rovanperä and Jonne Halttunen. Eight-time World Champion Sébastien Ogier had also announced his intention to retire from the sport at the end of 2021. Later he decided to only contest selected events of the 2022 season. This restricted his chances of winning a ninth championship title. Ogier had previously planned to retire at the end of the 2020 championship, but the disruption brought about by the COVID-19 pandemic and the reduced number of events in 2020 prompted him to reconsider. Benjamin Veillas became Ogier's new co-driver following the retirement of Julien Ingrassia at the end of the 2021 championship. However, their partnership came to an end after the victory in Spain, with Landais replacing Veillas in Japan. Esapekka Lappi and Janne Ferm, who previously drove for Toyota from 2017 to 2018, returned to the team to share the third car with Ogier and Veillas. Takamoto Katsuta again contested a full campaign in a fourth car, this time under the new entrant Toyota Gazoo Racing WRT Next Generation, with Aaron Johnston becoming his co-driver on a full-time basis.

== Regulation changes ==
=== Technical regulations ===
The championship introduced a new set of technical regulations known as "Rally1" to replace the World Rally Car. The Rally1 regulations placed a greater emphasis on standardised parts than in previous years to make the sport more accessible.

Rally1 was also introduced hybrid drivetrains to the sport for the first time. This took the form of an e-motor that produces 100 kW (134.1 hp) fitted to current 1.6 L turbocharged inline-4 engine and must be used to power the car when travelling around service parks and through built-up areas when driving between stages. Drivers were free to use the e-motor to offer additional power when competing in a stage, with the FIA dictating how much power can be used and how long a driver can deploy it for. The hybrid system and the software governing its use will be standardised for three years as a way of keeping the costs of competing down. The system was provided by Compact Dynamics, a subsidiary of Formula E team Audi Sport ABT supplier Schaeffler.

The championship was also introduced with a standardised safety structure in a bid to improve safety standards. This coincided with the homologation requirements being re-written to allow teams to enter a scaled chassis based on production cars rather than having to adapt a chassis to fit a roadgoing model.

=== Sporting regulations ===
The eligibility requirements for crews entering events were simplified and streamlined into a system called the "FIA Rally Pyramid". The top tier of the sport was known as "Rally1". The second tier, "Rally2", was for manufacturer teams and professional independent teams in WRC2. This was followed by "Rally3" for privately entered and "gentlemen driver" crews competing in the WRC3. "Rally4" and "Rally5" entries would not contest their own dedicated championship, but would be permitted to enter WRC rallies.

Specific liaison sections in which Rally1 competitors must drive in full electric mode was introduced into the championship. Following calls from WRC manufacturers, time penalty for competitors who missed a special stage due to hybrid issue was reduced from ten minutes to two minutes from the 2022 Croatia Rally onwards.

== Season report ==
=== Opening rounds ===
The new season started at Monte-Carlo. Nine-time world champion Sébastien Loeb returned to the championship with M-Sport and was immediately in a battle for the victory with reigning world champion Sébastien Ogier. It was not until the final stage of Saturday when Ogier and Benjamin Veillas had a run with slick tyres through the icy stage that the time difference began to open up, with Loeb and Isabelle Galmiche trailing by over twenty seconds. However, a front-left puncture at the penultimate stage along with a penalty for a jump-start at the Power Stage lost Ogier and Veillas the lead, handing the rally victory to Loeb and Galmiche. This was Loeb's eightieth rally victory and his first since the 2018 Rally Catalunya. The victory also saw Loeb become the oldest driver to win a World Rally Championship event and Galmiche become the first female winner of a WRC fixture since 1997. Elfyn Evans and Scott Martin were also in the fight for the win before they went off-road. Hyundai's 2022 campaign got off to a troubled start, not only because of a lack of speed in comparison to M-Sport and Toyota, but also for its poor reliability which saw a series of mechanical failures that forced the crews of Ott Tänak and Martin Järveoja and of Oliver Solberg and Elliott Edmondson into retirements. The third crew of Thierry Neuville and Martijn Wydaeghe overcame a damper issue, only to finish in sixth place, over eight minutes off the lead.

The first leg of Rally Sweden saw five drivers leading in seven stages. Road opener Kalle Rovanperä and Jonne Halttunen faced the challenge to sweep loose snow, but they slotted into second overall by the end of Friday. The Finnish crew soon overhauled overnight leader Neuville and Wydaeghe on the following day and held on to the lead to grab their third career victory. Evans and Martin were running second while chasing down the rally leaders, but their effort was undone when they crashed on the final day and retired from the event. Tänak and Järveoja also retired on Friday following a hybrid unit issue, but they rejoined the rally and won the Power Stage. Craig Breen and Paul Nagle also had a weekend to forget as they beached their Puma on just the second stage of the rally. They eventually finished the event in last position, but did collect one consolation point from the Power Stage.

The Croatia Rally saw a series of punctures, with surprisingly low-grip conditions on wet tarmac making the rally eventful. Championship leaders Rovanperä and Halttunen held a long-lived lead, which was larger than a minute at one point. However, a compromised tyre choice along with a flat tyre saw the lead snatched by Tänak and Järveoja of Hyundai after the penultimate stage. Rovanperä and Halttunen gave a final push at the Power Stage to overcome Tänak and Järveoja, securing back-to-back victories and a commanding lead of twenty-nine points in the championships. The final podium spot was taken by Neuville and Wydaeghe, who were given a total of a two-minute time penalty for a late check-in and speeding during the road section. The troublesome campaign of Adrien Fourmaux and Alexandre Coria continued as they retired for the third rally in a row after crashing into the front garden of a neighbouring house.

=== Mid-season gravel events ===
Heading into the gravel part of the season, Rovanperä and Halttunen became the road-opening crew due to their positions as the championship leaders, but that did not sacrifice their performance. Their consistent pace at the opening day of Rally de Portugal saw them maximize the benefit from their rivals' troubles to acquire a better road position for Saturday. This was further transferred to blistering pace, as they overhauled long-time rally leader teammates Evans and Martin by the end of Saturday and eventually won their third event of the season, making it a hat-trick, along with another Power Stage win. The victory also saw the Finnish crew increase their championship leads to a commanding advantage of forty-six points. The returning Hyundai crew of Dani Sordo and Cándido Carrera put on a show with the Toyota crew of Takamoto Katsuta and Aaron Johnston, with the Hyundai pair coming out in front to round out the final podium, edging their rivals out by just over two seconds.

A couple of crews were battling for the lead as the Sardegna rally began, with Esapekka Lappi and Janne Ferm coming out in the lead at the end of the first leg. However, the Finnish crew crashed out at the opening stage of the following day, handing the rally lead to Ott Tänak and Martin Järveoja. The former world champions steadily increased their lead and eventually took the victory, ending a winning drought that lasted 462 days. Moving to Kenya, teams and crews had to face challenging conditions. While both M-Sport and Hyundai suffered, Toyota stayed out of troubles and finished the event with a 1–2–3–4 result, the first team to do so since Citroën Total WRT at the 2010 Rally Bulgaria. Championship leaders Rovanperä and Halttunen sealed the victory, their fourth of the season. The Finnish crew once again extended their lead in the championships, being sixty-five points clear in the title race by this point. The unstoppable form of Rovanperä and Halttunen continued in Estonia, where the Finnish crew claimed their fifth win in six rallies. Halfway through the season, their championship leads were stretched to eighty-three points.

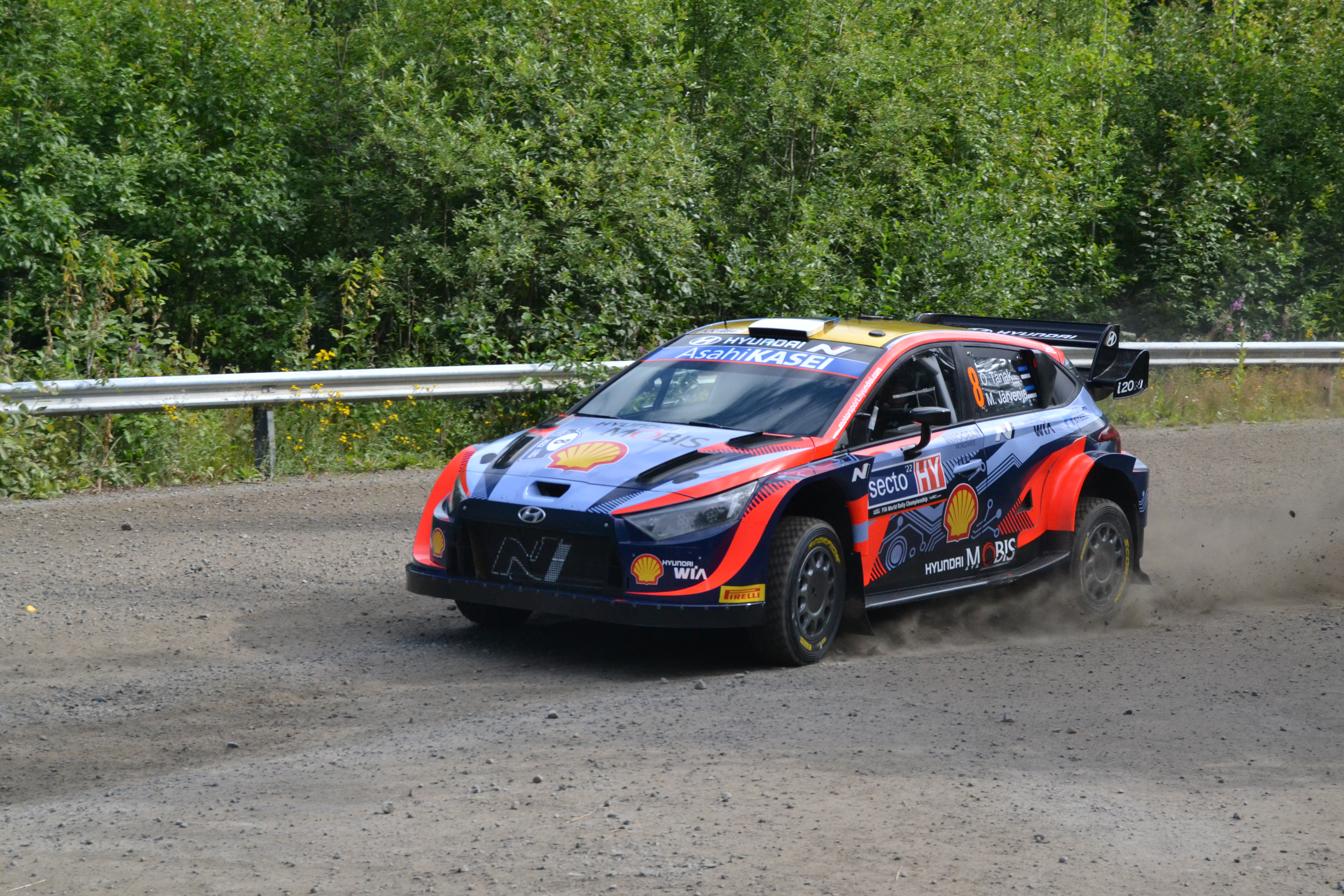
Ott Tänak and Martin Järveoja driving a Hyundai i20 N Rally1 at the 2022 Rally Finland

In the previous five years, Toyota had dominated the Rally Finland. However, the 2022 event was spoiled by the Hyundai crew of Tänak and Järveoja, who led the event from the start to finish (with the exception of the first stage) to secure their second win of the season. This helped the 2019 champions climbed up to second in the championships. The victory was also the first ever triumph in Finland for the South Korean manufacturer. Championship leaders Rovanperä and Halttunen were compromised by their road position on Friday, but fought back to take the runner-up spot. Teammates Lappi and Ferm rounded out the podium despite a roll during the penultimate stage.

=== Closing rounds ===
The second pure-asphalt event of the season was held in Ypres, where several infamous junction cuts caught out several top runners, including all three M-Sport crews, local heroes Neuville and Wydaeghe and championship leaders Rovanperä and Halttunen. The tricky tarmac did not trap the Hyundai crew of Tänak and Järveoja, who fended off the Toyota pair of Evans and Martin to secure their third victory of the season. Lappi and Ferm achieved back-to-back podium finishes, while Solberg and Edmondson completed the rally in a career-high fourth place. Hyundai carried on their form at Acropolis, finishing the rally with the first-ever 1–2–3 in team history, with Neuville and Wydaeghe taking the victory. Meanwhile, Rovanperä and Halttunen only took four points from the weekend, and therefore their championship leads were slashed to fifty-three points.

Rovanperä and Halttunen turned the tables by winning the following event, which was enough for the Finns to secure their first world titles. At the age of 22 years and 1 day, Rovanperä also became the youngest World Rally Champion, breaking the previous record set by Colin McRae at the age of 27 years and 89 days in 1995. Toyota then secured the manufacturers' title at the following round, while Ogier and Veillas — who sealed the first victory in his career — claimed the win.

The final round of the season, the Rally Japan, started with the Hyundai of Sordo and Carrera being destroyed by fire on the second stage. With Ogier and new co-driver Landais suffering a puncture and Breen and new co-driver James Fulton crashing out, Evans and Martin took the early lead ahead of Neuville and Rovanpera by the end of Friday. Rovanperä and Halttunen later dropped down to 12th after changing a punctured tyre and damaging a wheel, with Neuville and Wydaeghe surpassing Evans and Martin for the lead by the end of Saturday. Neuville and Wydaeghe eventually won the rally, while teammates Tänak and Järveoja completed a Hyundai 1–2 on their final outing for the team. Local hero Katsuta and Johnston rounded out the podium. An early puncture and late struggles in the rain on Sunday saw Evans drop further down to fifth.

== Results and standings ==
=== Season summary ===
| Round | Event | Winning driver | Winning co-driver | Winning entrant | Winning time | Report | Ref. |
|---|---|---|---|---|---|---|---|
| 1 | (Monaco) Rallye Automobile Monte Carlo | (France) Sébastien Loeb | (France) Isabelle Galmiche | (United Kingdom) M-Sport Ford WRT | 3:00:32.8 | Report | |
| 2 | Rally Sweden | (Finland) Kalle Rovanperä | (Finland) Jonne Halttunen | (Japan) Toyota Gazoo Racing WRT | 2:10:44.9 | Report | |
| 3 | Croatia Rally | (Finland) Kalle Rovanperä | (Finland) Jonne Halttunen | (Japan) Toyota Gazoo Racing WRT | 2:48:21.5 | Report | |
| 4 | Rally de Portugal | (Finland) Kalle Rovanperä | (Finland) Jonne Halttunen | (Japan) Toyota Gazoo Racing WRT | 3:44:19.2 | Report | |
| 5 | (Italy) Rally Italia Sardegna | (Estonia) Ott Tänak | (Estonia) Martin Järveoja | (South Korea) Hyundai Shell Mobis WRT | 3:10:59.1 | Report | |
| 6 | Safari Rally Kenya | (Finland) Kalle Rovanperä | (Finland) Jonne Halttunen | (Japan) Toyota Gazoo Racing WRT | 3:40:24.9 | Report | |
| 7 | Rally Estonia | (Finland) Kalle Rovanperä | (Finland) Jonne Halttunen | (Japan) Toyota Gazoo Racing WRT | 2:54:29.0 | Report | |
| 8 | Rally Finland | (Estonia) Ott Tänak | (Estonia) Martin Järveoja | (South Korea) Hyundai Shell Mobis WRT | 2:24:04.6 | Report | |
| 9 | Ypres Rally Belgium | (Estonia) Ott Tänak | (Estonia) Martin Järveoja | (South Korea) Hyundai Shell Mobis WRT | 2:25:38.9 | Report | |
| 10 | Acropolis Rally Greece | (Belgium) Thierry Neuville | (Belgium) Martijn Wydaeghe | (South Korea) Hyundai Shell Mobis WRT | 3:34:52.0 | Report | |
| 11 | Rally New Zealand | (Finland) Kalle Rovanperä | (Finland) Jonne Halttunen | (Japan) Toyota Gazoo Racing WRT | 2:48:01.4 | Report | |
| 12 | (Spain) RACC Rally Catalunya de España | (France) Sébastien Ogier | (France) Benjamin Veillas | (Japan) Toyota Gazoo Racing WRT | 2:44:43.9 | Report | |
| 13 | Rally Japan | (Belgium) Thierry Neuville | (Belgium) Martijn Wydaeghe | (South Korea) Hyundai Shell Mobis WRT | 2:43:52.3 | Report | |

=== Scoring system ===
Points were awarded to the top ten classified finishers in each event. In the manufacturers' championship, teams were eligible to nominate three crews to score points, but these points were only awarded to the top two classified finishers representing a manufacturer and driving a 2022-specification Rally1 car. There were also five bonus points awarded to the winners of the Power Stage, four points for second place, three for third, two for fourth and one for fifth. Power Stage points were awarded in the drivers', co-drivers' and manufacturers' championships.

| Position | 1st | 2nd | 3rd | 4th | 5th | 6th | 7th | 8th | 9th | 10th |
| Points | 25 | 18 | 15 | 12 | 10 | 8 | 6 | 4 | 2 | 1 |

=== FIA World Rally Championship for Drivers ===
The driver who recorded a top-ten finish was taken into account for the championship regardless of the categories.

| Pos. | Driver | MON (Monaco) | SWE (Sweden) | CRO (Croatia) | POR (Portugal) | ITA (Italy) | KEN (Kenya) | EST (Estonia) | FIN (Finland) | BEL (Belgium) | GRE (Greece) | NZL (New Zealand) | ESP (Spain) | JPN (Japan) | Points |
|---|---|---|---|---|---|---|---|---|---|---|---|---|---|---|---|
| 1 | (Finland) Kalle Rovanperä | 4^{1} | 1^{2} | 1^{1} | 1^{1} | 5^{2} | 1 | 1^{1} | 2^{1} | 62^{1} | 15^{2} | 1^{1} | 3^{3} | 12 | 255 |
| 2 | (Estonia) Ott Tänak | Ret | 20^{1} | 2^{2} | 6^{4} | 1 | Ret | 3 | 1^{4} | 1^{4} | 2^{1} | 3^{2} | 4^{4} | 2 | 205 |
| 3 | (Belgium) Thierry Neuville | 6^{3} | 2^{3} | 3 | 5^{3} | 41^{1} | 5^{1} | 4 | 5^{5} | 20^{3} | 1 | 4^{5} | 2^{2} | 1^{4} | 193 |
| 4 | (United Kingdom) Elfyn Evans | 21^{2} | Ret | 5^{3} | 2^{5} | 40^{3} | 2 | 2^{2} | 4^{3} | 2^{2} | Ret | Ret | 6 | 5 | 134 |
| 5 | (Japan) Takamoto Katsuta | 8 | 4^{4} | 6 | 4 | 6^{5} | 3 | 5^{5} | 6 | 5^{5} | 6 | Ret | 7^{5} | 3 | 122 |
| 6 | (France) Sébastien Ogier | 2^{5} | | | 51 | | 4^{3} | | | | | 2^{3} | 1^{1} | 4 | 97 |
| 7 | (Republic of Ireland) Craig Breen | 3 | 36^{5} | 4^{4} | 8 | 2 | 6 | 30 | 32^{2} | 63 | 5^{3} | 19 | 9 | 24^{1} | 84 |
| 8 | (Spain) Dani Sordo | | | | 3^{2} | 3 | | | | | 3 | | 5 | Ret | 59 |
| 9 | (Finland) Esapekka Lappi | | 3 | 49 | | 44^{4} | | 6^{4} | 3 | 3 | 22^{5} | | | | 58 |
| 10 | (United Kingdom) Gus Greensmith | 5 | 5 | 15 | 19 | 7 | 14^{4} | Ret | 7 | 19 | 29^{4} | Ret | Ret | 6 | 44 |
| 11 | (France) Sébastien Loeb | 1^{4} | | | Ret | | 8^{2} | | | | Ret | | | | 35 |
| 12 | (Sweden) Oliver Solberg | Ret | 6 | Ret | 47 | | 10 | 13 | Ret | 4 | | 5^{4} | | | 33 |
| 13 | (France) Pierre-Louis Loubet | | | 47 | 7 | 4 | | Ret | Ret | | 4 | | 10 | | 31 |
| 14 | (Norway) Andreas Mikkelsen | 7 | 7 | | Ret | Ret | | 8^{3} | | 7 | 13 | | | | 25 |
| 15 | (Finland) Emil Lindholm | | 32 | 9^{5} | | | | 10 | 8 | | 7 | | 14 | 9 | 16 |
| 16 | (France) Adrien Fourmaux | Ret | Ret | Ret | 9 | Ret | 13^{5} | 7 | 18 | Ret | WD | WD | 8 | WD | 13 |
| 17 | (France) Yohan Rossel | 13 | | 7 | 10 | 18 | | | | 8 | Ret | | 12 | | 11 |
| 18 | Nikolay Gryazin (Note: Nikolay Gryazin is a Russian national, but competes as an Authorised Neutral Athlete in accordance with recommendations made by the International Olympic Committee, after a decision by the FIA to ban all connections with Russia following the Russian invasion of Ukraine.) | 10 | Ret | 10 | 28 | 8 | | WD | DNS | 10 | 8 | | 13 | | 11 |
| 19 | (Poland) Kajetan Kajetanowicz | | | 8 | 11 | | 9 | 12 | | | | 8 | 16 | Ret | 10 |
| 20 | (Finland) Teemu Suninen | | | | Ret | 38 | | 9 | DSQ | | 17 | | 11 | 8^{3} | 9 |
| 21 | (New Zealand) Hayden Paddon | | | | | | | Ret | 11 | | | 6 | | | 8 |
| 22 | (France) Stéphane Lefebvre | Ret | | 12 | WD | | | | | 6 | | | | | 8 |
| 23 | (Luxembourg) Grégoire Munster | 12 | | 48 | | | | | | 11 | Ret | | 22 | 7 | 6 |
| 24 | (Greece) Jourdan Serderidis | | | | | 20 | 7 | | | | Ret | | 28 | WD | 6 |
| 25 | (Italy) Lorenzo Bertelli | | WD | | | | | | | | | 7 | | | 6 |
| 26 | (Finland) Jari Huttunen | | 9 | 28 | | 10 | | 11 | 9 | Ret | | | 15 | | 5 |
| 27 | (Norway) Ole Christian Veiby | | 8 | | | | | | | | | | | | 4 |
| 28 | (Italy) Mauro Miele | 17 | 23 | 24 | | Ret | | 26 | | | WD | | 27 | 25^{2} | 4 |
| 29 | (United Kingdom) Chris Ingram | 14 | | 11 | 12 | 11 | | | | 9 | Ret | | | | 2 |
| 30 | (Czech Republic) Erik Cais | 9 | | 14 | 42 | Ret | | | | | | | | | 2 |
| 31 | (Spain) Jan Solans | | | | 43 | 9 | | | | | | | 19 | | 2 |
| 32 | (Cyprus) Alexandros Tsouloftas | | | | | | | | | | 9 | | | | 2 |
| 33 | (New Zealand) Shane van Gisbergen | | | | | | | | | | | 9 | | | 2 |
| 34 | (Estonia) Egon Kaur | | 10 | | | | | 25 | 10 | | | | | | 2 |
| 35 | (Norway) Eyvind Brynildsen | | | | | | | | | | 10 | | | | 1 |
| 36 | (Australia) Harry Bates | | | | | | | | | | | 10 | | | 1 |
| 37 | (Finland) Heikki Kovalainen | | | | | | | | | | | | | 10 | 1 |
| 38 | (Paraguay) Fabrizio Zaldivar | | | | 31 | 33 | | 20 | 15 | | 11 | | 18 | 29^{5} | 1 |
| Pos. | Driver | MON (Monaco) | SWE (Sweden) | CRO (Croatia) | POR (Portugal) | ITA (Italy) | KEN (Kenya) | EST (Estonia) | FIN (Finland) | BEL (Belgium) | GRE (Greece) | NZL (New Zealand) | ESP (Spain) | JPN (Japan) | Points |

Key
| Colour | Result |
|---|---|
| Gold | Winner |
| Silver | 2nd place |
| Bronze | 3rd place |
| Green | Points finish |
| Blue | Non-points finish |
| Blue | Non-classified finish (NC) |
| Purple | Did not finish (Ret) |
| Black | Excluded (EX) |
| Black | Disqualified (DSQ) |
| White | Did not start (DNS) |
| White | Cancelled (C) |
| Blank | Withdrew entry from the event (WD) |

Notes:
^{1 2 3 4 5} – Power Stage position

=== FIA World Rally Championship for Co-Drivers ===
The co-driver who recorded a top-ten finish was taken into account for the championship regardless of the categories.

| Pos. | Co-Driver | MON (Monaco) | SWE (Sweden) | CRO (Croatia) | POR (Portugal) | ITA (Italy) | KEN (Kenya) | EST (Estonia) | FIN (Finland) | BEL (Belgium) | GRE (Greece) | NZL (New Zealand) | ESP (Spain) | JPN (Japan) | Points |
|---|---|---|---|---|---|---|---|---|---|---|---|---|---|---|---|
| 1 | (Finland) Jonne Halttunen | 4^{1} | 1^{2} | 1^{1} | 1^{1} | 5^{2} | 1 | 1^{1} | 2^{1} | 62^{1} | 15^{2} | 1^{1} | 3^{3} | 12 | 255 |
| 2 | (Estonia) Martin Järveoja | Ret | 20^{1} | 2^{2} | 6^{4} | 1 | Ret | 3 | 1^{4} | 1^{4} | 2^{1} | 3^{2} | 4^{4} | 2 | 205 |
| 3 | (Belgium) Martijn Wydaeghe | 6^{3} | 2^{3} | 3 | 5^{3} | 41^{1} | 5^{1} | 4 | 5^{5} | 20^{3} | 1 | 4^{5} | 2^{2} | 1^{4} | 193 |
| 4 | (United Kingdom) Scott Martin | 21^{2} | Ret | 5^{3} | 2^{5} | 40^{3} | 2 | 2^{2} | 4^{3} | 2^{2} | Ret | Ret | 6 | 5 | 134 |
| 5 | (Republic of Ireland) Aaron Johnston | 8 | 4^{4} | 6 | 4 | 6^{5} | 3 | 5^{5} | 6 | 5^{5} | 6 | Ret | 7^{5} | 3 | 122 |
| 6 | (France) Benjamin Veillas | 2^{5} | | | 51 | | 4^{3} | | | | | 2^{3} | 1^{1} | WD | 85 |
| 7 | (Republic of Ireland) Paul Nagle | 3 | 36^{5} | 4^{4} | 8 | 2 | 6 | 30 | 32^{2} | 63 | 5^{3} | 19 | 9 | | 79 |
| 8 | (Spain) Cándido Carrera | | | | 3^{2} | 3 | | | | | 3 | | 5 | Ret | 59 |
| 9 | (Finland) Janne Ferm | | 3 | 49 | | 44^{4} | | 6^{4} | 3 | 3 | 22^{5} | | | | 58 |
| 10 | (Sweden) Jonas Andersson | 5 | 5 | 15 | 19 | 7 | 14^{4} | Ret | 7 | 19 | 29^{4} | Ret | Ret | 6 | 44 |
| 11 | (France) Vincent Landais | | | 47 | 7 | 4 | | Ret | Ret | | 4 | | 10 | 4 | 43 |
| 12 | (France) Isabelle Galmiche | 1^{4} | | | Ret | | 8^{2} | | | | Ret | | | | 35 |
| 13 | (United Kingdom) Elliott Edmondson | Ret | 6 | Ret | 47 | | 10 | 13 | Ret | 4 | | 5^{4} | | | 33 |
| 14 | (Norway) Torstein Eriksen | 7 | 7 | | Ret | Ret | | 8^{3} | | 7 | 13 | | | | 25 |
| 15 | (Finland) Reeta Hämäläinen | | 32 | 9^{5} | | | | 10 | 8 | | 7 | | 14 | 9 | 16 |
| 16 | (France) Alexandre Coria | Ret | Ret | Ret | 9 | Ret | 13^{5} | 7 | 18 | Ret | WD | WD | 8 | WD | 13 |
| 17 | (France) Valentin Sarreaud | | | 7 | 10 | 18 | | | | 8 | Ret | | | | 11 |
| 18 | Konstantin Aleksandrov (Note: Konstantin Aleksandrov is a Russian national, but competes as an Authorised Neutral Athlete in accordance with recommendations made by the International Olympic Committee, after a decision by the FIA to ban all connections with Russia following the Russian invasion of Ukraine.) | 10 | Ret | 10 | 28 | 8 | | WD | DNS | 10 | 8 | | 13 | | 11 |
| 19 | (Poland) Maciej Szczepaniak | | | 8 | 11 | | 9 | 12 | | | | 8 | 16 | Ret | 10 |
| 20 | (Finland) Mikko Markkula | | | | Ret | 38 | | 9 | DSQ | | 17 | | 11 | 8^{3} | 9 |
| 21 | (New Zealand) John Kennard | | | | | | | Ret | 11 | | | 6 | | | 8 |
| 22 | (France) Andy Malfoy | Ret | | 12 | WD | | | | | 6 | | | | | 8 |
| 23 | (Belgium) Louis Louka | 12 | | 48 | | | | | | 11 | Ret | | 22 | 7 | 6 |
| 24 | (Belgium) Frédéric Miclotte | | | | | 20 | 7 | | | | Ret | | 28 | WD | 6 |
| 25 | (Italy) Lorenzo Granai | | | | | | | | | | | 7 | | | 6 |
| 26 | (Finland) Mikko Lukka | | 9 | 28 | | 10 | | 11 | 9 | Ret | | | 15 | | 5 |
| 27 | (Republic of Ireland) James Fulton | | 29 | | 40 | 28 | | 19 | 34 | Ret | | | 21 | 24^{1} | 5 |
| 28 | (Norway) Stig Rune Skjærmoen | | 8 | | | | | | | | | | | | 4 |
| 29 | (Italy) Luca Beltrame | 17 | 23 | 24 | | Ret | | 26 | | | WD | | 27 | 25^{2} | 4 |
| 30 | (United Kingdom) Craig Drew | | | 11 | 12 | 11 | | 15 | | 9 | Ret | | | | 2 |
| 31 | (Czech Republic) Petr Těšínský | 9 | | 14 | 42 | Ret | | | | | | | | | 2 |
| 32 | (United Kingdom) Ross Whittock | 14 | | | | | | | | | 9 | | | | 2 |
| 33 | (Spain) Rodrigo Sanjuan de Eusebio | | Ret | | 43 | 9 | | | | | | | 19 | | 2 |
| 34 | (Australia) Glen Weston | | | | | | | | | | | 9 | | | 2 |
| 35 | (Estonia) Silver Simm | | 10 | | | | | 25 | 10 | | | | | | 2 |
| 36 | (Norway) Roger Eilertsen | | | | | | | | | | 10 | | | | 1 |
| 37 | (Australia) John McCarthy | | | | | | | | | | | 10 | | | 1 |
| 38 | (Japan) Sae Kitagawa | | | | | | | | | | | | | 10 | 1 |
| 39 | (Italy) Marcelo Der Ohannesian | Ret | 33 | | Ret | 27 | | 20 | 15 | | 11 | | 18 | 29^{5} | 1 |
| Pos. | Co-Driver | MON (Monaco) | SWE (Sweden) | CRO (Croatia) | POR (Portugal) | ITA (Italy) | KEN (Kenya) | EST (Estonia) | FIN (Finland) | BEL (Belgium) | GRE (Greece) | NZL (New Zealand) | ESP (Spain) | JPN (Japan) | Points |

Key
| Colour | Result |
|---|---|
| Gold | Winner |
| Silver | 2nd place |
| Bronze | 3rd place |
| Green | Points finish |
| Blue | Non-points finish |
| Blue | Non-classified finish (NC) |
| Purple | Did not finish (Ret) |
| Black | Excluded (EX) |
| Black | Disqualified (DSQ) |
| White | Did not start (DNS) |
| White | Cancelled (C) |
| Blank | Withdrew entry from the event (WD) |

Notes:
^{1 2 3 4 5} – Power Stage position

=== FIA World Rally Championship for Manufacturers ===
Only the best two results of each manufacturer in the respective overall classification and Power Stage at each rally were taken into account for the championship.

| Pos. | Manufacturer | MON (Monaco) | SWE (Sweden) | CRO (Croatia) | POR (Portugal) | ITA (Italy) | KEN (Kenya) | EST (Estonia) | FIN (Finland) | BEL (Belgium) | GRE (Greece) | NZL (New Zealand) | ESP (Spain) | JPN (Japan) | Points |
|---|---|---|---|---|---|---|---|---|---|---|---|---|---|---|---|
| 1 | (Japan) Toyota Gazoo Racing WRT | 2 | 1^{2} | 1^{1} | 1^{1} | 4^{2} | 1 | 1^{1} | 2^{1} | 2^{2} | 5^{2} | 1^{1} | 1^{1} | 4 | 525 |
| 1 | (Japan) Toyota Gazoo Racing WRT | 4^{1} | 3 | 5^{3} | 2^{5} | 7^{3} | 2^{3} | 2^{2} | 3 | 3 | 6^{5} | 2^{3} | 3^{3} | 5 | 525 |
| 1 | (Japan) Toyota Gazoo Racing WRT | NC^{2} | Ret | NC | NC | NC | NC | NC | NC^{3} | NC^{1} | Ret | Ret | NC | NC | 525 |
| 2 | (South Korea) Hyundai Shell Mobis WRT | 5^{3} | 2^{3} | 2^{2} | 3^{2} | 1 | 4^{1} | 3 | 1^{4} | 1^{4} | 1 | 3^{2} | 2^{2} | 1^{4} | 455 |
| 2 | (South Korea) Hyundai Shell Mobis WRT | Ret | 6 | 3 | 5^{3} | 3 | 7 | 4 | 4^{5} | 4 | 2^{1} | 4 | 4^{4} | 2 | 455 |
| 2 | (South Korea) Hyundai Shell Mobis WRT | Ret | NC^{1} | Ret | NC | NC^{1} | Ret | NC | Ret | NC^{3} | NC | NC^{4} | NC | Ret | 455 |
| 3 | (United Kingdom) M-Sport Ford WRT | 1^{4} | 5 | 4^{4} | 6 | 2 | 5 | 6 | 6 | 6 | 3^{3} | 5 | 6 | 6 | 257 |
| 3 | (United Kingdom) M-Sport Ford WRT | 3 | 7^{5} | 7 | 7 | 6 | 6^{2} | 7 | 7 | 7 | 7^{4} | Ret | 7 | 7^{1} | 257 |
| 3 | (United Kingdom) M-Sport Ford WRT | Ret | Ret | Ret | Ret | Ret | NC^{5} | Ret | NC^{2} | Ret | Ret | WD | Ret | WD | 257 |
| 4 | (Japan) Toyota Gazoo Racing WRT NG | 6 | 4^{4} | 6 | 4 | 5^{5} | 3 | 5^{5} | 5 | 5^{5} | 4 | Ret | 5^{5} | 3 | 138 |
| Pos. | Manufacturer | MON (Monaco) | SWE (Sweden) | CRO (Croatia) | POR (Portugal) | ITA (Italy) | KEN (Kenya) | EST (Estonia) | FIN (Finland) | BEL (Belgium) | GRE (Greece) | NZL (New Zealand) | ESP (Spain) | JPN (Japan) | Points |

Key
| Colour | Result |
|---|---|
| Gold | Winner |
| Silver | 2nd place |
| Bronze | 3rd place |
| Green | Points finish |
| Blue | Non-points finish |
| Blue | Non-classified finish (NC) |
| Purple | Did not finish (Ret) |
| Black | Excluded (EX) |
| Black | Disqualified (DSQ) |
| White | Did not start (DNS) |
| White | Cancelled (C) |
| Blank | Withdrew entry from the event (WD) |

Notes:
^{1 2 3 4 5} – Power Stage position
