= Rally4 =

FIA rally car formula

Group Rally4
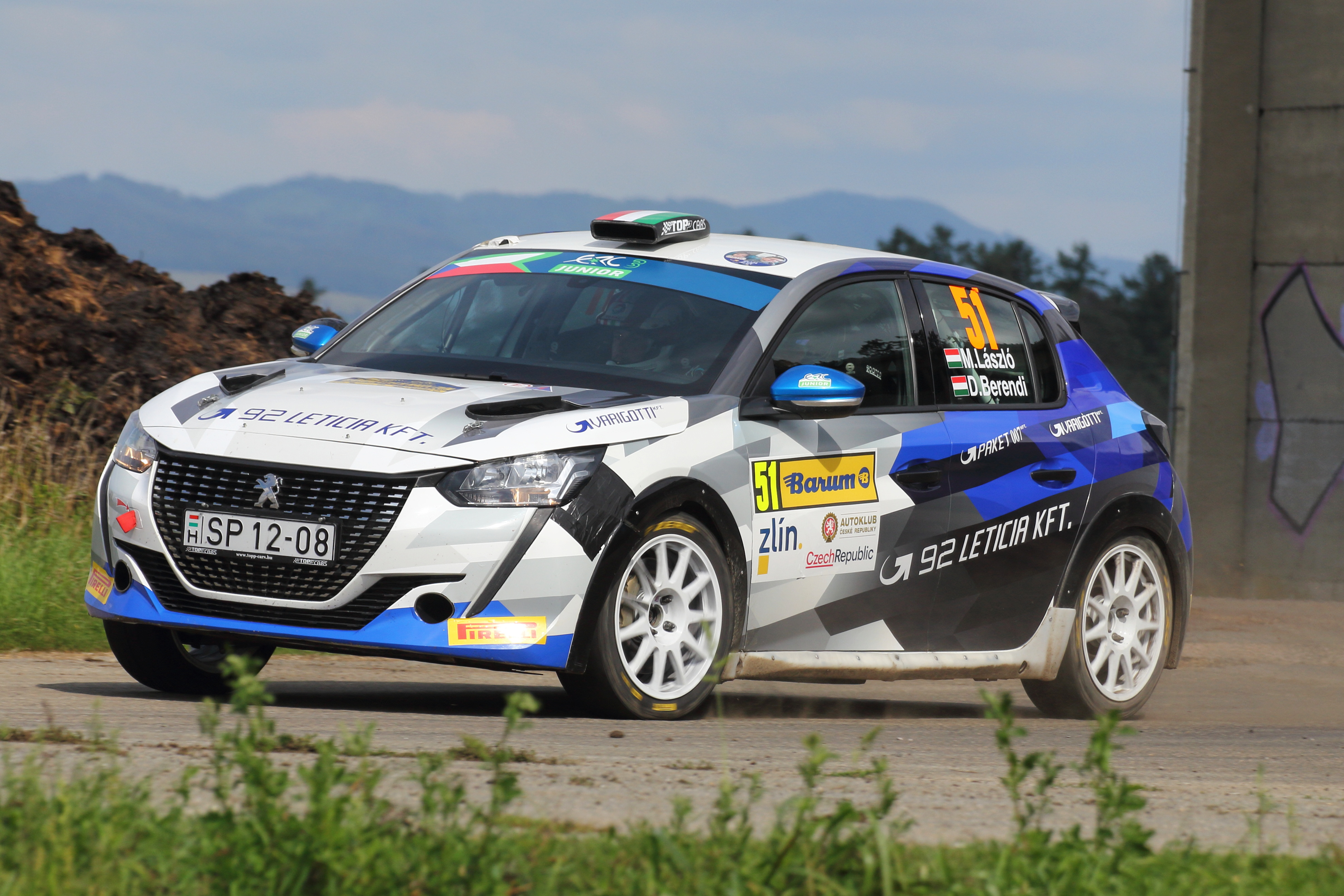

Motor racing formula
- Category: Rallying
- Country/Region: International
- Championships: WRC, Regional, National
- Inaugural: 2019 (2008 as R2)
- Status: Active
- Drivetrain: Two Wheel Drive
- Power to weight: 5.1kg/hp
- Aptitude: Performance

Rally4 is a technical specification of rally car determined by the FIA for use in its international competitions: World Rally Championship (WRC) and regional championships. National rallying competitions also allow Rally4 cars to compete. There are two technical subclasses of Rally4 however these do not affect competitive eligibility. The group was launched in 2019 after the introduction of the Rally Pyramid initiative to reorganise the classes of car and championships in international rallying was approved in June 2018.

The formula for Rally4 cars was taken from R2 class of Group R and tweaked with the defining ruleset interchanging the terms, this meant that any existing R2 car homologated or approved since their introduction in 2008 could continue to be used in Rally4 level competition. However, R2 cars homologated prior to 2019 were not required to have a turbo restrictor fitted and remain exempt. Those of R2B class cars also retain the minimum weight of 1030 kg and must use 6.5"x16" on asphalt rallies.

In July 2024, the FIA announced slightly modified Rally4 cars will be eligible to race in circuit touring car racing under the name of TC Lite 4 (TCL4) from 2025.

== Definition ==
Rally4 cars are defined in FIA document Appendix J - Article 260 as Touring Cars or Large Scale Series Production Cars, supercharged Petrol engine (including rotary engines), 2-wheel drive (front or rear wheel drive)). A production touring car with at least 2500 identical units manufactured must be homologated in Group A, with all the components and changes that make it a Rally4 car homologated in an extension. They have a power to weight ratio of 5.1kg/hp.

Key Specific Regulations for Cars in Group Rally4
Class	(Group R legacy class)	Drivetrain	Minimum Weight	Engine Capacity	Aspiration	Fuel	Maximum Cylinders	Turbo Restrictor	Wheels Gravel	Wheels Asphalt	Production Requirement
Ra4B	R2B	2WD	1080 kg	1390-1600cc	Normal	Petrol	6	30mm	6"x15"	6.5"x16" or 7"x17"	2500
Ra4B	R2B	2WD	1080 kg	927-1067cc	Turbo	Petrol	6	30mm	6"x15"	6.5"x16" or 7"x17"	2500
Ra4C	R2C	2WD	1080 kg	1600-2000cc	Normal	Petrol	6	30mm	6"x15"	7"x17"	2500
Ra4C	R2C	2WD	1080 kg	1067-1333cc	Turbo	Petrol	6	30mm	6"x15"	7"x17"	2500

== FIA Competition ==
Rally4 cars are placed in FIA 'RC4' sporting class alongside R3 and Group A cars.

Eligibility in FIA WRC Championships 2023
Class	Group	WRC	M	T	WRC2	WRC3	Masters	Junior
RC4	Rally4	Yes					Yes	

Eligibility in FIA Regional Championships 2023
Class	Group	ALL	ERC				ERT	ARC				MERC				APRC			NACAM			CODASUR		
Class	Group	Absolute	Teams	ERC3	ERC4	Jun	Jun	ARC2	ARC3	ARC4	Jun	MERC2	MERC3	MERC4	Jun	APRC3	APRC4	Jun	NAC3	NAC4	Jun	COD2	COD3	COD4
RC4	Rally4	Yes	Yes		Yes	Yes	Yes			Yes	Yes			Yes	Yes		Yes	Yes		Yes	Yes			Yes

== Cars ==
Manufacturer	Car	Debut	Homologation Basis	Image
(United Kingdom) Ford	Fiesta Rally4	2019	FIA - A5775; Fiesta ST-Line (Fiesta Mk7); 999cc Turbo	
(United Kingdom) Ford	Fiesta R2T	2015	FIA - A5762; Fiesta 1.0 Ecoboost 140 PS (Fiesta Mk7); 999cc Turbo	Ford Fiesta R2 - Roland Poom
(United Kingdom) Ford	Fiesta R2	2012	FIA - A5729; Fiesta 1.6 (Fiesta Mk6); 1597cc Normal	WRCweekend2011 (5569785631)
(Italy) Lancia	Ypsilon Rally4 HF	2025	FIA - A5789; Lancia Ypsilon; 1204cc Turbo	
(Germany) Opel	Corsa Rally4	2021	FIA - A5781; Opel Corsa GS Line 130; 1204cc Turbo	
(Germany) Opel	Adam R2	2014	FIA - A5752; Adam Slam 3-Door Hatchback; 1398cc Normal	Rally Poland 2021 Damian Łata
(France) Peugeot	208 Rally4	2020	FIA - A5780; 208 GT Line 130; 1204cc Turbo	
(France) Peugeot	208 R2	2012	FIA - A5743; 208 VTI 125 3 Portes; 1598cc Normal	Rajd Polski - 2018 Catie Munnings 02
(France) Renault	Clio Rally4	2021	FIA - A5779; Clio R.S. Line TCE 1.3EDC; 1331cc Turbo	
(France) Renault	Twingo R2	2010	FIA - A5731; Twingo "Renault Sport"; 1598cc Normal	2013 Rallye Sunseeker (10366877384)
(Czech Republic) Škoda	Fabia R2	2011	FIA - A5737; Fabia 1.6 16v 1598cc Normal	2014 Rally Bohemia - Triner
(Portugal) Kia	Rio Rally4	2021	FIA - none Built by CRM Motorsport Approved for use in national championships	
Source: FIA Homologation List 2021

== See also ==
- Rally Pyramid
- Groups Rally
- Rally1
- Rally2
- Rally3
- Rally5
