= Rally5 =

FIA rally car formula

Group Rally5
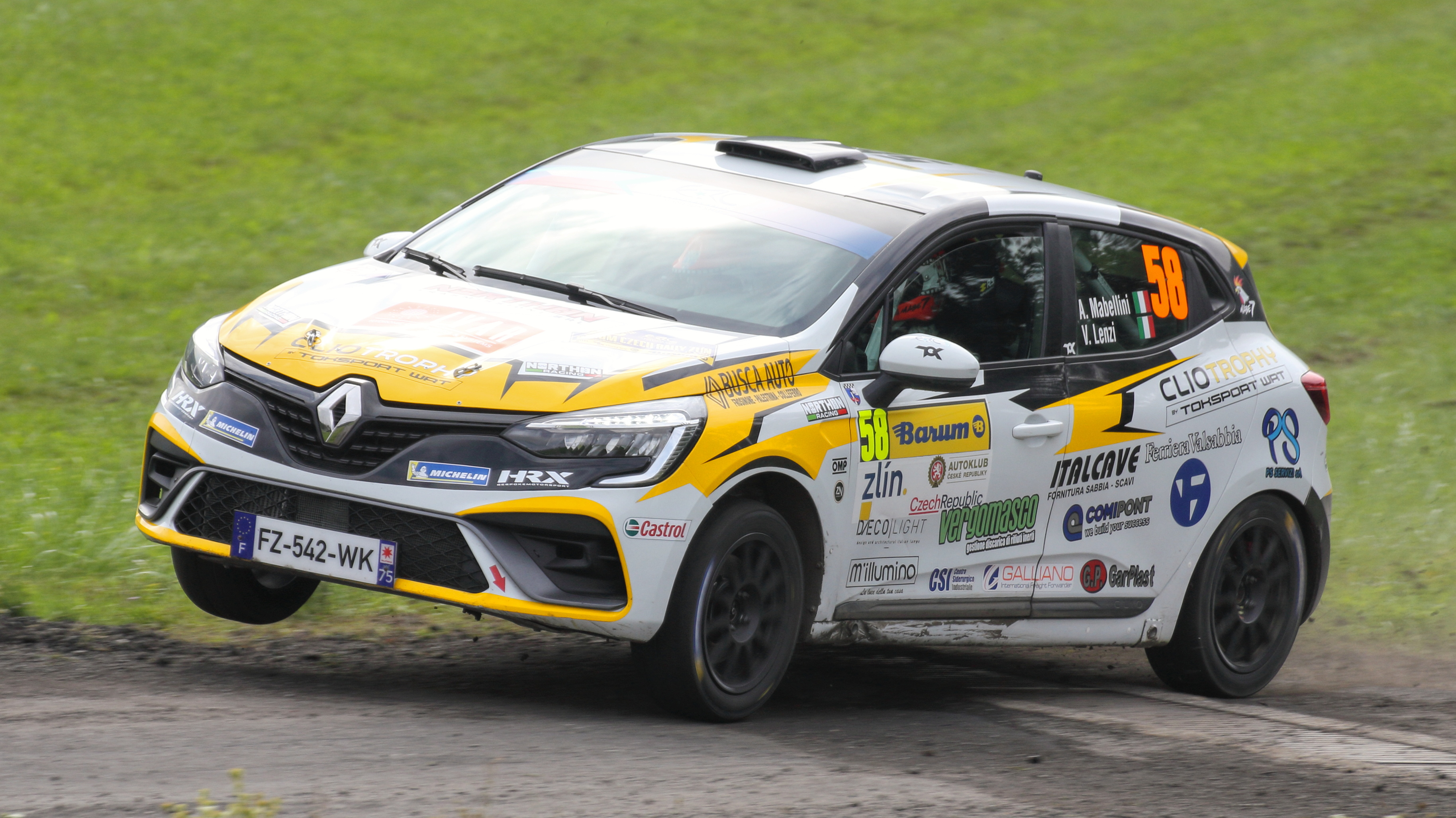

Motor racing formula
- Category: Rallying
- Country/Region: International
- Championships: WRC, Regional, National
- Inaugural: 2019 (2008 as R1)
- Status: Active
- Drivetrain: Two Wheel Drive
- Power to weight: 6.4kg/hp
- Aptitude: Access

Rally5 is a technical specification of rally car determined by the FIA for use in its international rallying competitions: World Rally Championship (WRC) and regional championships. National rallying competitions also allow Rally5 cars to compete. The group was launched in 2019 after the introduction of the Rally Pyramid initiative to reorganise the classes of car and championships in international rallying was approved in June 2018.

The formula for Rally5 cars was taken from R1 class of Group R with the defining ruleset interchanging the terms, this meant that any existing R1 car homologated or approved since their introduction in 2008 could continue to be used in Rally5 level competition. The subclasses defined in R1 however have effectively merged and capacity of permitted turbocharged engines have increased to 1333cc.

In July 2024, the FIA announced slightly modified Rally5 cars will be eligible to race in circuit touring car racing under the name of TC Lite 5 (TCL5) from 2025.

== Definition ==
Rally5 cars are defined in FIA document Appendix J - Article 260 as Touring Cars or Large Scale Series Production Cars, supercharged Petrol engine (including rotary engines), 2-wheel drive (front or rear wheel drive). A production touring car with at least 2500 identical units manufactured must be homologated in Group A, with all the requirements that make it a Rally5 car homologated in an extension. They have a power to weight ratio of 6.4kg/hp.

Rally5 rules are relaxed in comparison to the other Groups Rally formulae making it the most cost efficient and accessible. Only the bodyshell (with safety cage), the seat mountings and the harness need to be homologated, the latter two already having their own Appendix J ruleset outside of Rally5. Bodyshells homologated under Rally4 regulations are also permitted in Rally5 therefore potentially expanding the range of cars available. Most components of the original Group A model can be used and in many cases are free to replace, however in such cases the performance criteria of Rally5 must always be met.

Key Specific Regulations for Cars in Group Rally5
Drivetrain	Minimum Weight	Engine Capacity	Aspiration	Fuel	Maximum Cylinders	Turbo Restrictor	Wheels Gravel	Wheels Asphalt	Production Requirement
2WD	1030 kg	Up to 1600cc	Normal	Petrol	6	As manufactured	6"x15"	6.5"x16"	2500
2WD	1030 kg	Up to 1067cc	Turbo	Petrol	6	As manufactured	6"x15"	6.5"x16"	2500
2WD	1080 kg	1067-1333cc	Turbo	Petrol	6	As manufactured	6"x15"	6.5"x16"	2500

== FIA Competition ==
Rally5 cars are placed in FIA 'RC5' sporting class alone.

Eligibility in FIA WRC Championships 2023
Class	Group	WRC	M	T	WRC2	WRC3	Masters	Junior
RC5	Rally5	Yes					Yes	

Eligibility in FIA Regional Championships 2023
Class	Group	ALL	ERC				ERT	ARC				MERC				APRC			NACAM			CODASUR		
Class	Group	Absolute	Teams	ERC3	ERC4	Jun	Jun	ARC2	ARC3	ARC4	Jun	MERC2	MERC3	MERC4	Jun	APRC3	APRC4	Jun	NAC3	NAC4	Jun	COD2	COD3	COD4
RC5	Rally5	Yes	Yes		Yes	Yes	Yes			Yes	Yes			Yes	Yes		Yes	Yes		Yes	Yes			Yes

== Cars ==
Manufacturer	Car	Debut	Homologation Basis	Image
(France) Citroën	DS3 R1	2012	FIA - A5739; DS3 VTI 120 So Chic; 1598cc Normal	Monte-Carlo WRC 2014 ES2 - 12048975956
(United Kingdom) Ford	Fiesta Rally5	2020	FIA - A5775; Fiesta ST-Line (Fiesta Mk7); 999cc Turbo	
(United Kingdom) Ford	Fiesta R1	2012	FIA - A5729; Fiesta 1.6 (Fiesta Mk6); 1597cc Normal	2021 Rally Bohemia - Kalina
(France) Renault	Clio Rally5	2020	FIA - A5779; Clio R.S. Line TCE 1.3EDC; 1331cc Turbo	
(France) Renault	Twingo R1	2010	FIA - A5731; Twingo "Renault Sport"; 1598cc Normal	2013 Rallye Sunseeker (10367080843)
(Japan) Toyota	Vitz	2012	FIA - A5742; Vitz (NCP131); 1501cc Normal	
(Japan) Mazda	2 R1	2020	FIA - no homologation Approved for use in FIA NACAM; Built by GHR Motorsport	
(Japan) Suzuki	Swift Rally5	-	FIA - no homologation Project of Suzuki Motorsport	
Source: FIA Homologation List 2021

In addition to the above, bodyshells (and safety cage) homologated in Rally4 since 2020 would also be accepted subject to meeting Rally5 criteria elsewhere. For example, where original parts must be used, or power and weight limits met:

- Opel Corsa Rally4
- Peugeot 208 Rally4

== See also ==
- Rally Pyramid
- Groups Rally
- Rally1
- Rally2
- Rally3
- Rally4
