= Rally3 =

FIA rally car formula

Group Rally3
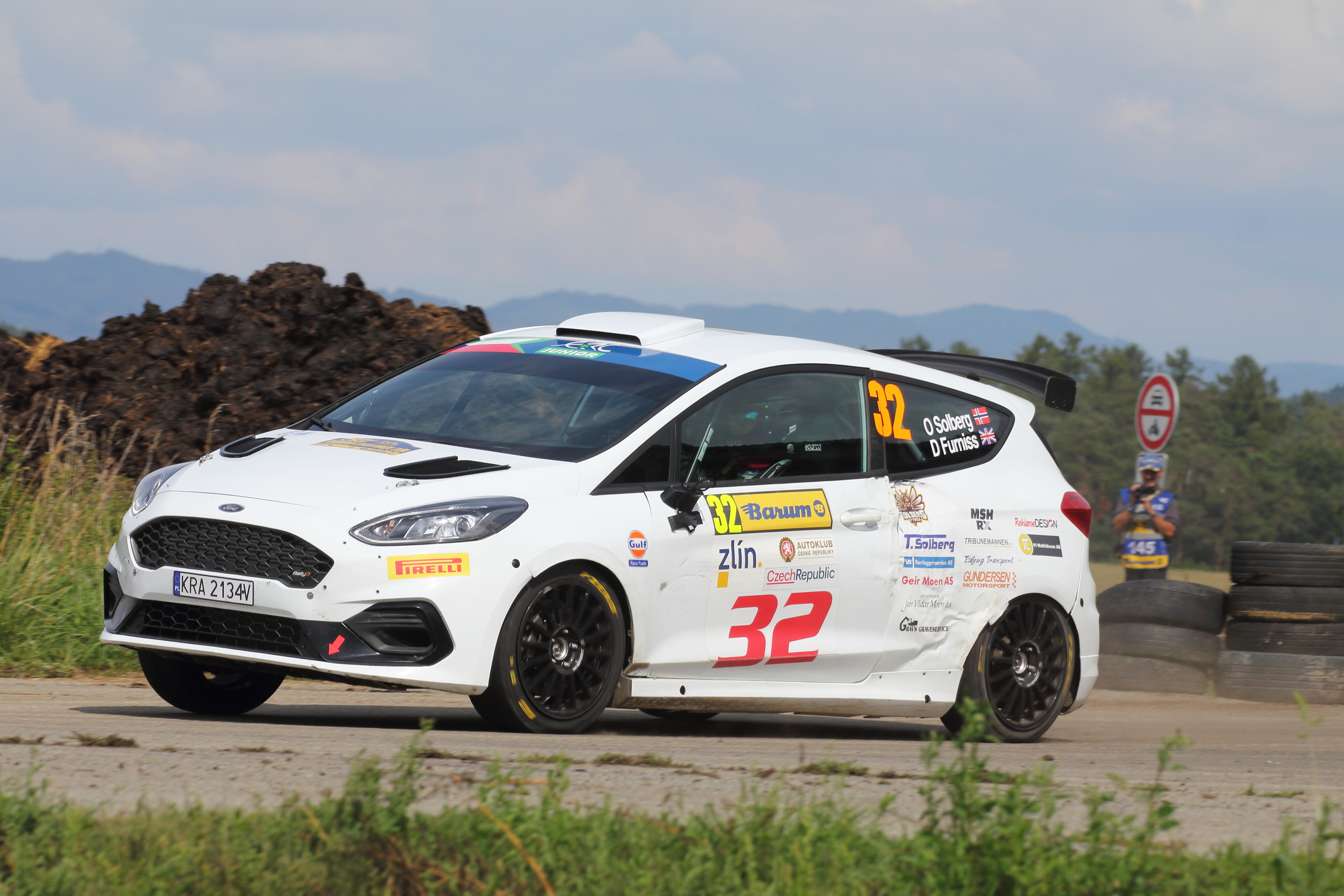

Motor racing formula
- Category: Rallying
- Country/Region: International
- Championships: WRC, Regional, National
- Inaugural: 2021
- Status: Active
- Drivetrain: Four Wheel Drive
- Weight to power: 5.6kg/hp
- Aptitude: Access

Rally3 is a technical specification of rally car determined by the FIA. It features four-wheel drive and a maximum weight-to-power ratio of 5.6kg/hp. The class is used in the World Rally Championship (WRC) and regional championships. National rallying competitions also allow Rally3 cars to compete. There are three technical subclasses of Rally3 however these do not affect competitive eligibility. The regulations were launched in 2021 with the homologation of the first car after the introduction of the Rally Pyramid initiative to reorganise the classes of car and championships in international rallying was approved in June 2018.

The group was designed to be entry level and the cheapest way to go rallying with four-wheel drive, as existing options like Rally2 and Group Rally2-Kit were considered too expensive for some privateers, and too high performance for newcomers to 4WD cars.

Two-wheel-drive R3 cars from Group R were at level RC3 with the mentioned Rally2 and Rally2-Kit at level RC2 in the FIA's sporting classes. With the introduction of Rally3, R3 were reclassified to RC4.

== Definition ==
Group Rally3 cars are defined in FIA document 'Appendix J - Article 260' as Touring Cars or Large Scale Series Production Cars, petrol engine, 4-wheel drive. A production touring car with at least 2500 identical units manufactured must be homologated in Group A, with all the components and changes that make it a Group Rally3 car homologated in an extension.

Cars have a 31mm air intake restrictor, a maximum power-to-weight ratio of 5.6kg/hp, and a rally-ready price cap of €100,000 plus taxes.

The subclasses are based on engine cylinder capacity in common with existing Rally4 classes, allowing for possibility of upgrade or sharing of many components with a Rally4 car.

Key Specific Regulations for Cars in Group Rally3
Class	Drivetrain	Minimum Weight	Engine Capacity	Aspiration	Fuel	Maximum Cylinders	Turbo Restrictor	Wheels Gravel	Wheels Asphalt	Production Requirement
Ra3B	4WD	1210 kg	1390-1600cc	Normal	Petrol	6	31mm	6"x15"	7"x17"	2500
Ra3B	4WD	1210 kg	927-1067cc	Turbo	Petrol	6	31mm	6"x15"	7"x17"	2500
Ra3C	4WD	1210 kg	1600-2000cc	Normal	Petrol	6	31mm	6"x15"	7"x17"	2500
Ra3C	4WD	1210 kg	1067-1333cc	Turbo	Petrol	6	31mm	6"x15"	7"x17"	2500
Ra3D	4WD	1210 kg	1333-1620cc	Turbo	Petrol	6	31mm	6"x15"	7"x17"	2500

== FIA Competition ==
Rally3 cars are placed alone in FIA 'RC3' sporting class.

Eligibility in FIA WRC Championships 2023
Class	Group	WRC	M	T	WRC2	WRC3	Masters	Junior
RC3	Rally3	Yes				Yes	Yes	Yes

Eligibility in FIA Regional Championships 2023
Class	Group	ALL	ERC				ERT	ARC				MERC				APRC			NACAM			CODASUR		
Class	Group	Absolute	Teams	ERC3	ERC4	Jun	Jun	ARC2	ARC3	ARC4	Jun	MERC2	MERC3	MERC4	Jun	APRC3	APRC4	Jun	NAC3	NAC4	Jun	COD2	COD3	COD4
RC3	Rally3	Yes	Yes	Yes			Yes		Yes		Yes		Yes			Yes		Yes	Yes				Yes	

== Cars ==
Manufacturer	Car	Homologation approved	Homologation expiry	Homologation Basis	Image
(United Kingdom) Ford	Fiesta Rally3	2021	2028	FIA - A5782; Fiesta ST (Fiesta Mk7); 1497cc Turbo	
(France) Renault	Clio Rally3	2023	2032	FIA - A5779; Clio R.S. Line (Clio V); 1,330 cc Turbo	
Source: FIA Homologation List 2026

== See also ==
- Rally Pyramid
- Groups Rally
- Rally1
- Rally2
- Rally4
- Rally5
- Fédération Internationale de l'Automobile
