= Rally2 =

FIA rally car formula

Group Rally2
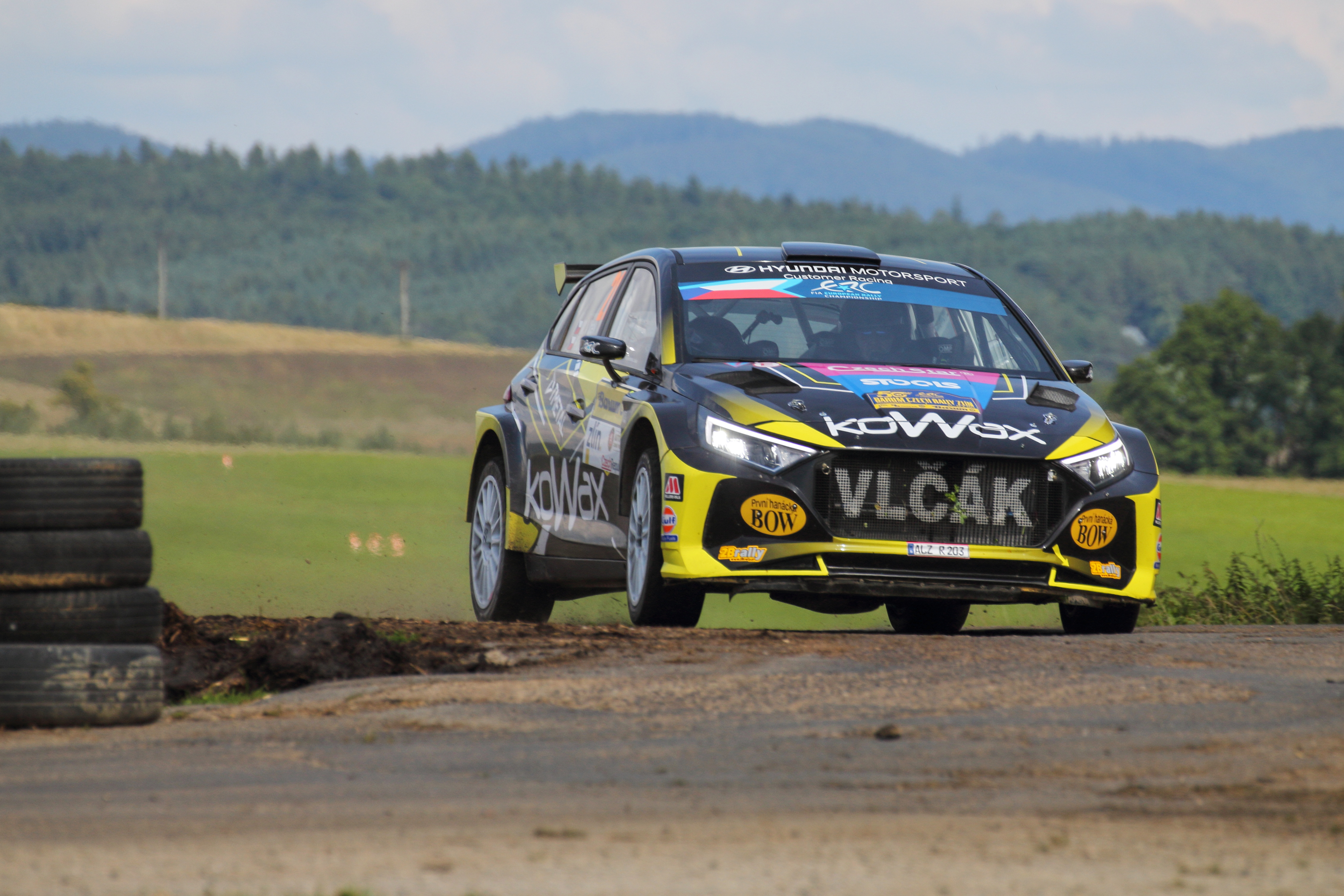

Motor racing formula
- Category: Rallying
- Country/Region: International
- Championships: WRC, Regional, National
- Inaugural: 2019 (2012 as R5)
- Status: Active
- Drivetrain: Four-wheel drive
- Weight to power: 4.2kg/hp
- Aptitude: Performance

Rally2 (previously known as R5) is a technical specification of rally car determined by the FIA. It features 1.6L turbo engines, four-wheel drive and a maximum weight-to-power ratio of 4.2 kg/hp. Rally2 cars are used in the World Rally Championship, exclusively in its WRC2 support championship; the FIA continental championships and in national championships.

The technical regulations were developed ahead of the 2012 rallying season and known as R5 within the scope of Group R. In 2019, with the reorganisation of the Rally Pyramid, the ruleset was renamed as Group Rally2. This meant that any existing R5 car homologated or approved since their introduction continue to be used in Rally2 level competition. R5 cars were first introduced as an intended replacement for the S2000 car.

In years prior to 2019, 'Rally 2' was used to describe the rules and scenario allowing a rally competitor to restart a rally the day following a retirement. This was renamed 're-start after retirement' in FIA regulations from 2019. Rally2 should not be confused with R2 cars of Group R either, which are officially described as 'Rallye 2'.

== Definition ==
Rally2 cars are defined in FIA document '2021 Appendix J - Article 261' as Touring Cars or Large Scale Series Production Cars, supercharged Petrol engine, 4-wheel drive. A production touring car with at least 2500 identical units manufactured must be homologated in Group A, with all the components and changes that make it a Rally2 car homologated in an extension. The power to weight ratio is 4.2 kg/hp.

Key Specific Regulations for Cars in Group Rally2
| Drivetrain | Minimum Weight | Engine Capacity | Aspiration | Fuel | Maximum Cylinders | Restrictor | Wheels Gravel | Wheels Asphalt | Production Requirement |
|---|---|---|---|---|---|---|---|---|---|
| 4WD | 1230 kg | 1620cc | Turbo | Petrol | 4 | 32mm | 6.5" x 15" or 7" x 15" | 8" x 18" | 2500 |

=== Rally2-WRC-Kit ===
For the 2027 and 2028 World Rally Championship seasons, the FIA introduced an option for Rally2 manufacturers to homologate a kit, allowing them to compete within the top category against new generation Rally1 machines. The kit includes aerodynamic parts and allows for a 10 kg weight reduction to 1220 kg, with the aim to achieve greater performance parity with the new cars.

== FIA Competition ==
Rally2 cars are placed in FIA 'RC2' sporting class alongside Group Rally2-kit, R4, NR4 and S2000 cars.

Eligibility in FIA WRC Championships 2023
| Class | Group | WRC | M | T | WRC2 | WRC3 | Masters | Junior |
|---|---|---|---|---|---|---|---|---|
| RC2 | Rally2 | Yes | | | Yes | | Yes | |

Eligibility in FIA Regional Championships 2023
| Class | Group | ALL | ERC | | | | ERT | ARC | | | | MERC | | | | APRC | | | NACAM | | | CODASUR | | |
| Class | Group | Absolute | Teams | ERC3 | ERC4 | Jun | Jun | ARC2 | ARC3 | ARC4 | Jun | MERC2 | MERC3 | MERC4 | Jun | APRC3 | APRC4 | Jun | NAC3 | NAC4 | Jun | COD2 | COD3 | COD4 |
|---|---|---|---|---|---|---|---|---|---|---|---|---|---|---|---|---|---|---|---|---|---|---|---|---|
| RC2 | Rally2 | Yes | Yes | | | | Yes | | | | Yes | | | | | | | Yes | | | | | | |

== Cars ==
| Homologation Nationality | Manufacturer | Car | Chassis Basis | Homologation | | Engine | Image |
| Homologation Nationality | Manufacturer | Car | Chassis Basis | Approved | Expiry | Engine | Image |
|---|---|---|---|---|---|---|---|
| Czech Republic | Škoda | Fabia RS Rally2 | FIA - A5786 Fabia 1.0 MPI 59 KW Active 5 Gears Manual | 2022 | 2032 | Škoda Motorsport modified VAG 2.0L EA888 reduced to 1620cc 289 bhp | 2024 Bohemia Rally Mladá Boleslav - Kohn |
| Czech Republic | Škoda | Fabia Rally2 evo | FIA - A5777; Fabia 1.0 MPI 55 KW Ambition 5 Gears Manual | 2019 | 2026 | Škoda Motorsport modified VAG 1.8L EA888 reduced to 1620cc 284 bhp | |
| Czech Republic | Škoda | Fabia R5 | FIA - A5760; Fabia 1.0 MPI 44 KW; 999cc Normal | 2015 | 2026 | Škoda Motorsport modified VAG 1.8L EA888 reduced to 1620cc 284 bhp | Rally Poland 2021 Robert Blomberg |
| Germany | Volkswagen | Polo GTI R5 | FIA - A5774; Polo 1.0 MPI 55 KW Comfortline 5 Gears Manual | 2018 | 2028 | VW Motorsport modified VAG 1.8L EA888 reduced to 1600cc 272 bhp | Oliver at Rally Liepaja 2019 |
| France | Citroën | C3 Rally2 | FIA - A5773; C3 Feel Puretech 82; 1200cc Normal | 2018 | 2030 | Citroën Racing 1598cc 282 bhp | |
| France | Citroën | DS3 R5 | FIA - A5739; DS3 VTI 120 So Chic; 1598cc Normal | 2014 | 2024 | PSA EP6 CDT1598cc 280 bhp | |
| France | Peugeot | 208 T16 R5 | FIA - A5743; 208 VTI 125 3 Portes; 1598cc Normal | 2014 | 2027 | PSA EP6 CDT1598cc 280 bhp | Rajd Polski 2015 Martin Koči |
| France | Lancia | Ypsilon Rally2 HF Integrale | FIA - A5789 Ypsilon 1204cc | 2026 | 2032 | Lancia Corse HF 1598cc 287 bhp | |
| (United Kingdom) Great Britain | Ford | Fiesta Rally2 | FIA - A5775; Fiesta ST-Line (Fiesta Mk7); 999cc Turbo | 2019 | 2027 | M-Sport 1.6L 290 bhp | |
| (United Kingdom) Great Britain | Ford | Fiesta R5 | FIA - A5748; Fiesta ST (Fiesta Mk6); 1597cc Turbo | 2013 | 2026 | M-Sport 1.6L 290 bhp | 2016 Rally GB - Marius Aasen |
| Japan | Toyota | GR Yaris Rally2 | FIA - A5788; GR Yaris RS 1.5L | 2024 | 2031 | Toyota Gazoo Racing G16E-GTS 1618.2cc | |
| Malaysia | Proton | Iriz R5 | FIA - A5776; Iriz 1.3L 5 Gears Manual Gearbox; 1332cc Normal | 2018 | 2025 | Mellors Elliott Motorsport modified Mitsubishi 4B11T 2.0 reduced to 1600cc | Rally Poland 2021 Nabila Tejpar |
| South Korea | Hyundai | i20 N Rally2 | FIA - A5784 i20 / Kappa 1.4L - 6 Gears - Auto Transmission | 2021 | 2028 | 1600cc Turbo | |
| South Korea | Hyundai | i20 R5 | FIA - A5766 i20 1.0 T-GDI; 997.7cc Turbo | 2016 | 2027 | 1600cc Turbo | 2019 Rally Poland - Daniel Chwist |
| | Mitsubishi | Mirage R5 | FIA - none Built by Ralliart Sweden unsupported by Mitsubishi; Approved for use in APRC | Debuted 2014 | | Ralliart modified Mitsubishi 4B11T 2.0 reduced to 1620cc 280 bhp | Rallymobil 2018, Mitsubishi Mirage R5 (44534558781) |
| | Toyota | Etios R5 | FIA - none Built by Toyota Gazoo Racing Paraguay; Approved for use in CODASUR | Debuted 2016 | | Unknown | Ale-FX |
| | Source: FIA Homologation Lists 2021, 2022, 2023, 2024 2025 2026 | | | | | | |

== See also ==
- Rally Pyramid
- Groups Rally
- Group R
- Rally1
- Rally3
- Rally4
- Rally5
