= Renault Clio Rally5 =

Renault Rally5 rally car

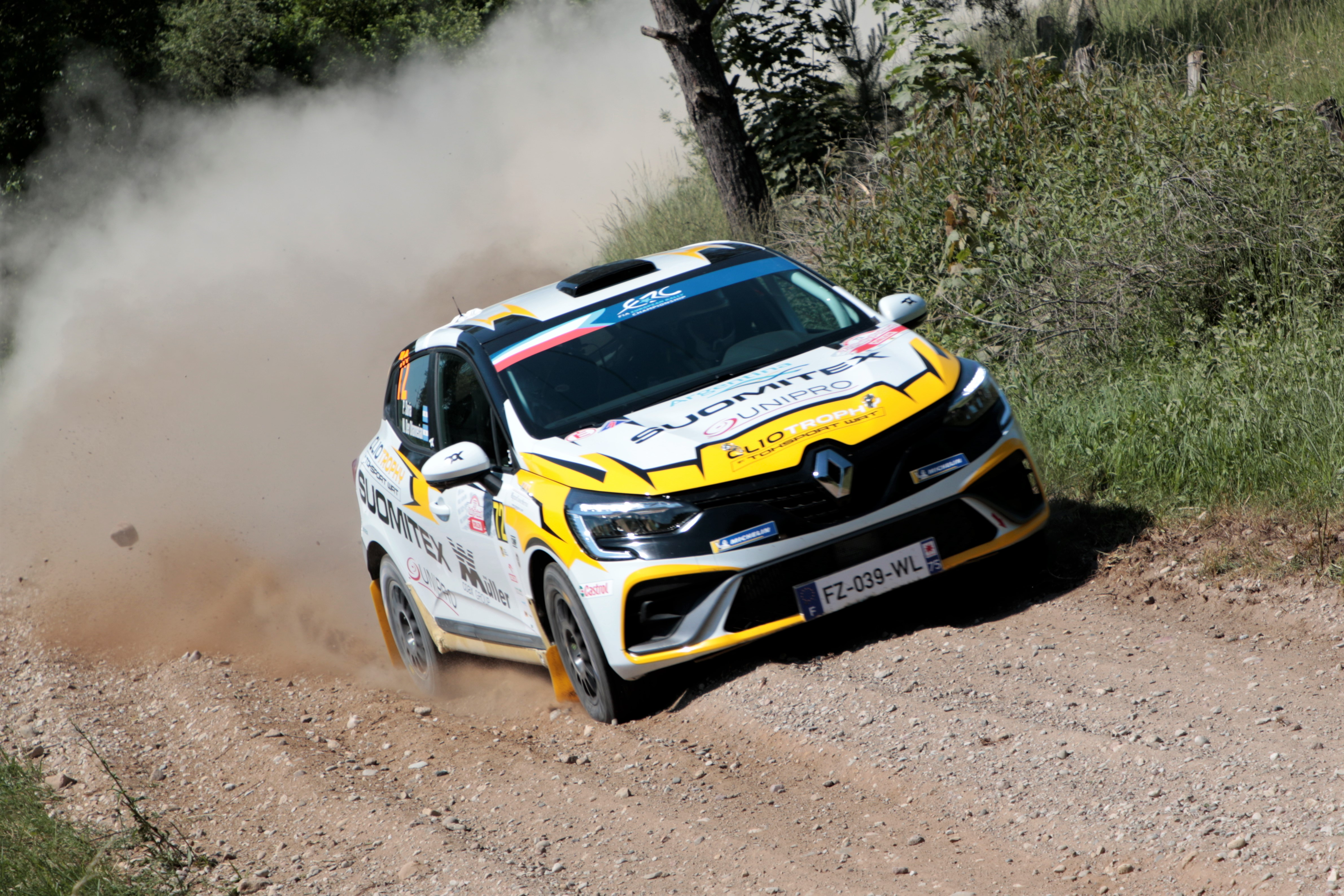
- A Clio Rally5 at the 2021 Rally Poland
- Category: Group Rally5
- Constructor: Renault Sport
- Designer: Vincent Gaillardot

Technical specifications
- Length: 4,050 mm (159.4 in)
- Width: 1,988 mm (78.3 in)
- Height: 1,400 mm (55.1 in)
- Axle track: Front: 1,550 mm (61.0 in); Rear: 1,480 mm (58.3 in)
- Wheelbase: 2,579 mm (101.5 in)
- Engine: Renault TCe 1.3 L (79 cu in) I4, 16-valve Garrett turbocharger front-engine, front-wheel-drive
- Torque: 300 N⋅m (221 lb⋅ft)
- Transmission: Sadev 5-speed sequential ZF-type LSD
- Power: 180 hp (134 kW)
- Weight: 1,080 kg (2,381 lb)
- Fuel: 98 RON gasoline

Competition history
- Debut: 2020 Rally Mexico

The Renault Clio Rally5 is a rally car developed and built by Renault Sport for the Group Rally5 specification of the Rally Pyramid. It is based upon the Renault Clio road car and made its WRC debut at the 2020 Rally Mexico.

== Development ==
Intended to be driven by rally beginners, the Clio Rally5 uses a less powerful engine than the Rally4 variant. Unlike the Clio Rally4, the Rally5 does not feature adjustable shock absorbers. The car also uses slightly narrower tyres at tarmac events than the Rally4 car.

== Competition history ==
The car was used in the Renault Clio Trophy created by Toksport on select events of the 2021 European Rally Championship season, with the winner of the category offered a three-event drive in a Renault Clio Rally4.
