= Groups Rally =

International rally cars

In international rallying, the Groups Rally are the collective name given to formulae of rally car as defined by the Fédération Internationale de l'Automobile for use in the World Rally Championship and the FIA's regional championships. The names were approved in June 2018 and began being used in 2019 in conjunction with promotion of the Rally Pyramid, a reorganisation of rallying nomenclature, car specifications and championships. As of 2020, the groups' names are officially defined as replacing Group R in the FIA's competitions. The numbering used in the names of the new groups align with the FIA sporting classification, Rally1 is in RC1, Rally2 in RC2, and so on. From 2022 the championships will also align to these numbers, WRC2 shall use Rally2 cars whereas ERC3 for example, will Rally3 cars.

== Categories ==
Summary of the new groups in the FIA Rally Pyramid
Group	Category	Drivetrain	Aptitude	Weight/Power (KG/HP)	Formerly	Introduction
Rally1	RC1	4WD	Elite	3.1	WRC (Note: Although the information in this table was gathered from the FIA, the specifications of the new Rally1 are radically different from the outgoing World Rally Car.)	2022
Rally2	RC2	4WD	Performance	4.2	R5	2013
Rally3	RC3	4WD	Access	5.6	Group N (Note: Group N regulations are not involved in Rally3, this cell is populated only to describe the purpose of the class/tier as in the FIA newsletter.)	2021
Rally4	RC4	2WD	Performance	5.1	R2	2019
Rally5	RC5	2WD	Access	6.4	R1	2019

Rally1 would only be used in the World Rally Championship from 2022 when it will replace the World Rally Car in the manufacturer's championship.

Rally2 became the new name for R5 of Group R. New cars are homologated under the new name although existing R5 cars are still eligible for Rally2 level competition. In similar fashion, Group Rally2-Kit had become the new name for R4-Kit cars of Group R, although the defining ruleset has since reverted to the R4-Kit name.

Rally3 introduced a new four-wheel-drive car to international rallying designed for access and cost conscious privateers.

Rally4 and Rally5 became the new names for R2 and R1. New cars are homologated under the new name and existing cars are still eligible for those level competitions.

Group R-GT is also presented by the FIA as a Group Rally though was not introduced with the Rally Pyramid. Group R-GT has existed since 2013 and runs under its own sporting classification, R-GT.

== See also ==
- Fédération Internationale de l'Automobile
- World Rally Championship
- Rally Pyramid
- Rally1
- Rally2
- Rally3
- Rally4
- Rally5
- Group R-GT
