= Proton Iriz R5 =

Proton R5 rally car

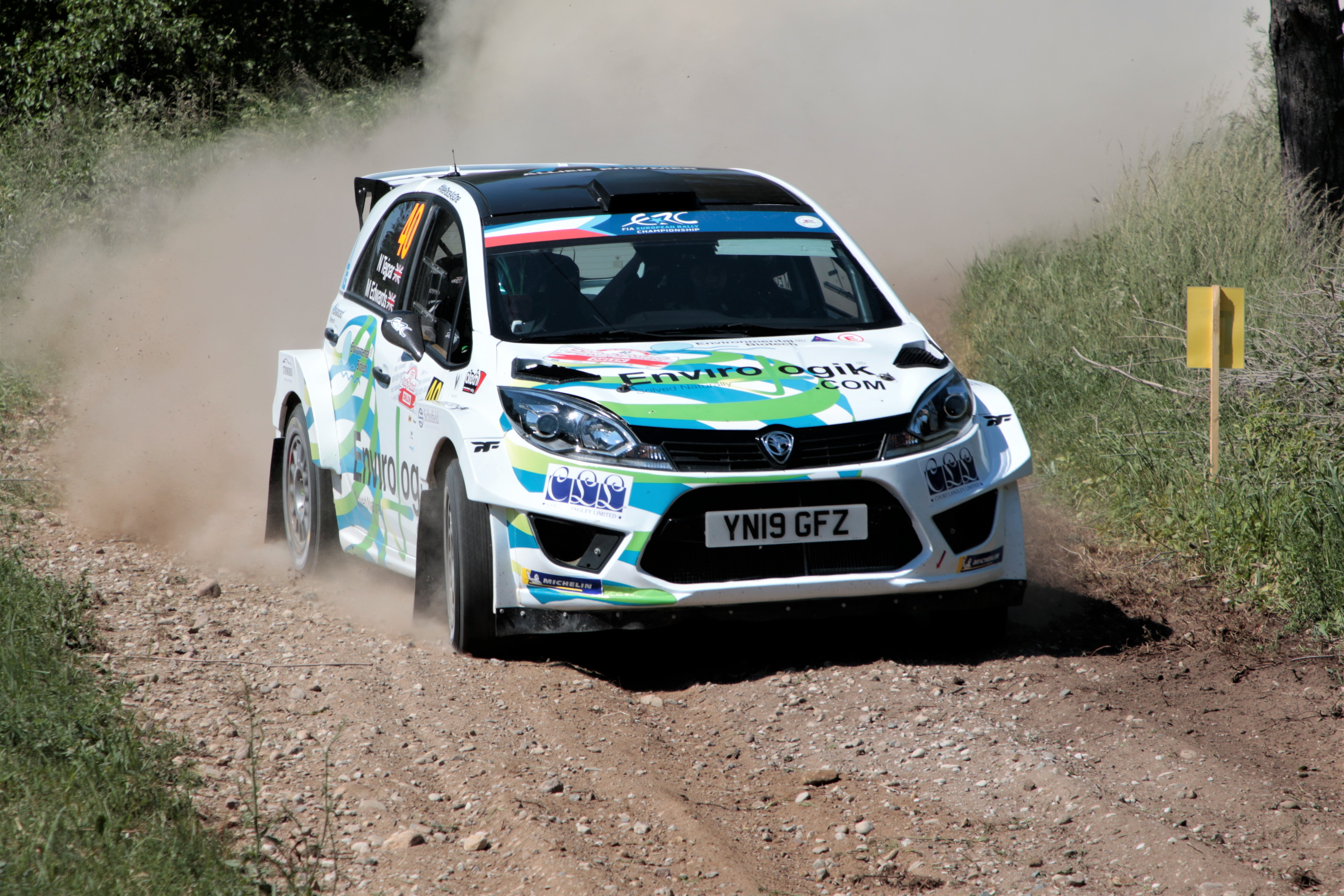
- An Iriz R5 at the 2021 Rally Poland
- Category: R5
- Constructor: Mellors Elliot Motorsport (MEM)

Technical specifications
- Suspension (front): Reiger
- Suspension (rear): Reiger
- Engine: MEM developed 4B11 engine 1.6 L (98 cu in) turbocharged
- Transmission: XTRAC Sequential Gearbox 6 4-wheel drive
- Weight: 1,230 kg (2,711.7 lb)
- Lubricants: SORT Oil
- Tyres: Michelin

Competition history
- Notable drivers: Oliver Mellors, Nabila Tejpar, Julian Hope, Oliver O'Donovan, Theo Bengry, Eugene Donnelly, David Condell, Declan Gallagher, Liam Egan, James Williams
- Debut: (United Kingdom) 2017 Goodwood Rally Stage
- First win: Goodwood Rally Stage 2017
- Last win: Grizedale Rally Stages 2019
Races	Wins	Podiums
39	8	15
- Teams' Championships: 0
- Constructors' Championships: 0
- Drivers' Championships: 0

The Proton Iriz R5 is a R5 rally car built by Mellors Elliot Motorsport in the UK under license from Proton. It is based upon the Proton Iriz road car. The car marked the comeback of the British Rally Championship for Proton.

In 2022, the rally car was succeeded by the Proton Iriz RX (Rallycross), which was built specifically for Team RX Racing and Ollie O'Donovan.
