= Rally1 =

FIA rally car formula

Group Rally1
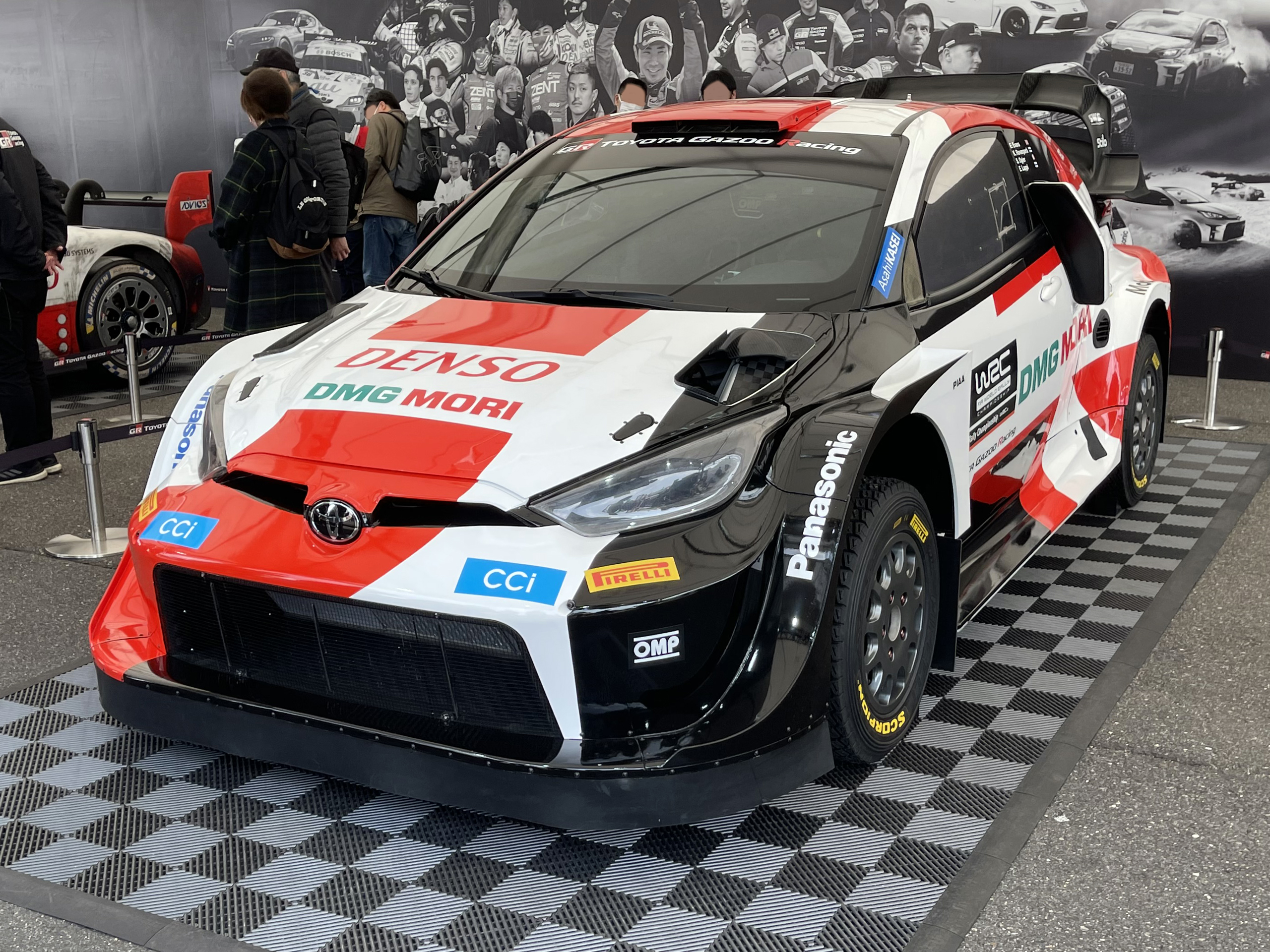

Motor racing formula
- Category: Rallying
- Country/Region: International
- Championships: WRC
- Inaugural: 2022
- Drivetrain: Four Wheel Drive
- Weight to power: 3.1 kg/hp
- Aptitude: Elite

Rally1 is a technical specification of rally car for use at the highest level of international rallying in the World Rally Championship (WRC) as determined by the FIA. The cars were used for the first time in the 2022 WRC season and replaced the outgoing World Rally Car used in the manufacturer's championship. Though they may run on any individual rally as permitted by the organiser, they are not to be used in any other championship.

The calls for new cars were made by the existing WRC competing manufacturers to reflect both changes in consumer marketing preferences, such as advancements in technology, and the need to reduce costs to make competing sustainable. The move to a new formula of car was approved in June 2018 along with a complete overhaul of cars and championships in the Rally Pyramid.

== Regulations ==
=== 2022–2026 ===
Rally1 cars are defined in Article 262 of Appendix J of the International Sporting Code. The cars have two radical new features for rally cars in the World Rally Championship, the first being hybrid electric power units in use for the first time. The second, less obvious characteristic is that Rally1 cars are not needed to be homologated in Group A or N and have no series production car requirement with being 'Category II' purpose-built competition vehicles. However, they must be identifiable as being based on a series production model. Tubular space frame chassis are permitted, whereas production bodyshells are permitted as tradition. They also feature common safety cell structures, centrally designed in partnership with the FIA. The existing 386 PS 1.6 l global race engine continues to be used.

Other key features include:

- synthetic fuels, claimed to be sustainable and renewable
- Artificial Intelligence Safety Cameras (AISC), to monitor the special stage for safety purpose, eg. out of place spectators
- less complex suspension with reduced travel
- a reduction from 6 to 5 speed gearboxes, in common with Rally2 cars including the removal of 'flappy-paddle' gear shifters
- removal of the active central differential altogether
- ban on liquid cooled brakes
- simplified fuel tank shape
- simplified turbo
- removal of the fresh air valve in the anti-lag system
- removal of some aerodynamic components

The changes to aerodynamics remove expensive and commonly damaged parts such as the rear diffuser. Hidden ducts for cooling purposes are banned.

==== Hybrid system ====
The hybrid electric power system is supplied to all teams by a third party, Compact Dynamics, incorporating a battery supplied by Kreisel Electric. It is used to power the cars in 100% electric zones on liaison sections as set in the rally roadbook by the rally organiser. On the special stages it also provides a boost of up to 100 kW or 136 PS alongside the combustion engine and recuperates kinetic energy under braking. The driver will have three options to choose from to deploy the boost, with a further three options to choose on how to recuperate energy under braking. The driver must set these options before a special stage and are not able to choose when to deploy the electric boost within the stage. The hybrid electric system adds an extra 84 kg to the cars' gross weight and due to its 750 volts the cars will wear HY identification, with white letters on a red background, on the door panel. Crews are also required to carry high voltage gloves to use in the event of an issue.

The use of hybrid power was discontinued in 2025 as teams felt that the cost of repairing damaged units was becoming too expensive.

=== WRC27 (2027–) ===
New regulations were created ahead of the 2027 season to encourage greater participation. Initially called 'WRC27', the cars are to use a standard FIA developed chassis onto which body panels can be fixed, with established Rally2 specification powertrain and components inside. This philosophy was intended to cut development time and costs required. Further, the rules allow bespoke designs, severing a link with production car manufacturers that had been central to rallying and the WRC series since its inception in 1973. Reflecting this, the WRC Championship for Manufacturers is to be renamed the Championship for Constructors from 2027.

Toyota Gazoo Racing were the first to announce a new Rally1 build, beginning testing in 2026. In November 2026 Toyota announced they will enter two separate teams each competing with their own car. Toyota Racing is set to compete with the newly-built GR Celica Rally1, and Gazoo Racing is set to compete with the GR Yaris Rally1.

Independent Belgian racing company, Prospeed, also announced their Project Rally One ambition in 2025 and also began testing in 2026. The company having previously been involved in circuit racing primarily with Porsches, become the first constructor of the new regulations that was not previously a car builder. They were also the first to publicly launch their car, albeit without a name, in September 2026.

In April 2026, a third constructor announced intention to build a car to the regulations, WRT Rally1 Spain, a collaboration between Spanish motorsport company RMC Motorsport and the Spanish national motorsport federation, RFEDA.

In October 2026, Ford announced that they would return to the championship as a 'full factory team', partnering with M-Sport to build a Rally1 for use in the 2029 season.

== FIA competition ==
Rally1 cars are only permitted in the World Rally Championship and when entered by the manufacturer teams. The cars may appear on other individual rallies when entered by the manufacturers but not under a championship point-scoring situation.

Eligibility in FIA WRC Championships 2023
Class	Group	WRC	M	T	WRC2	WRC3	Masters	Junior
RC1	Rally1	Yes	Yes	Yes				

== Cars ==
Manufacturer	Car	Debut	Chassis	Image
(South Korea) Hyundai	Hyundai i20 N Rally1	2022	Tubular, Scaled	
(United Kingdom) M-Sport Ford	Ford Puma Rally1	2022	Tubular, Scaled	
(Japan) Toyota	Toyota GR Yaris Rally1	2022	Tubular, Scaled	
Source: FIA Homologations List 2022
