= Group R =

FIA racing car classification for production-derived cars

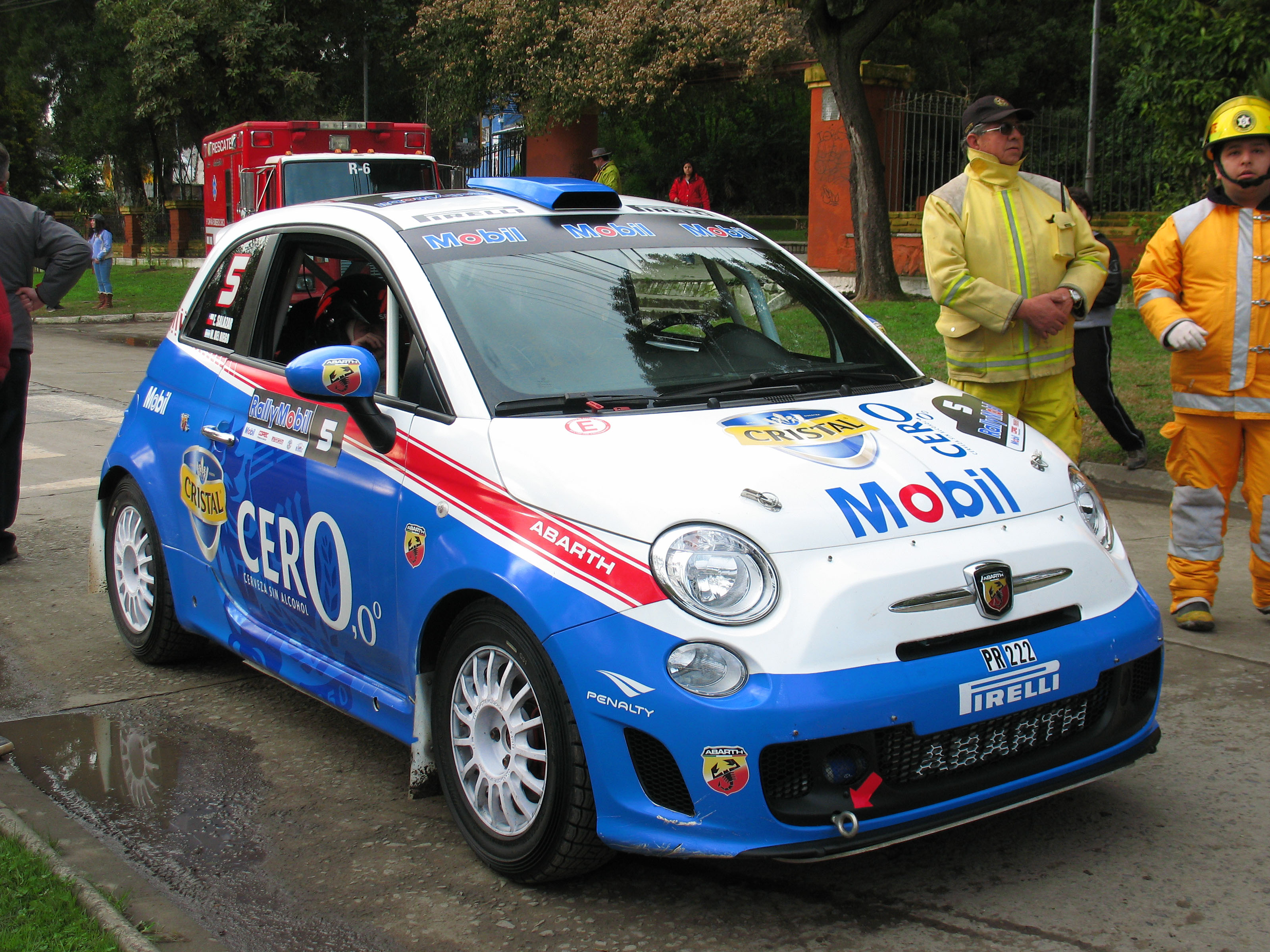
An Abarth 500 Rally R3T.

Group R is a set of technical regulations for production-based rallying cars by the Fédération Internationale de l'Automobile (FIA). The Group R regulations were gradually introduced from 2008 as a replacement for Group A and Group N rally cars.

To comply with Group R regulations, a car must first be homologated in Group A (or in some cases Group N) and receive one or more VR extensions. Each VR extension is a set of homologated parts and modifications, designed and sold (as a kit or as a complete car) by the manufacturer.

As part of its structure, the Group R regulations have a provision for GT cars, known as R-GT.

== Classes ==
Group R consists of six classes, designated R1, R2, R3, R4, R5 and R-GT; some of these groups contain their own sub-groups, with cars allocated to each group based on their weight, engine size and powertrain.

The first batch of rules, which were introduced in 2008, featured the R1, R2 and R3 classes. These were restricted to two-wheel drive cars with atmospheric engines up to 2000cc. Supercharged engines were allowed only in R3T (petrol) and R3D (diesel) sub-classes. Since 2015 the R1, R2 and R3 classes allow supercharged engines with a 1.5 equivalency factor for displacement.

Additional regulations were issued in 2011 which covered the R4 and R-GT classes; the R4 was conceived as an evolutionary step for previously-homologated Group N4 cars, turbocharged, all-wheel drive cars based on production models. The R4 class is for cars competing under Group N regulations for production cars prior to 2013. No new models would be homologated under R4 regulations, with the FIA taking the long-term view that these would be replaced by bespoke kit cars. The R4 Kit cars have a standard engine, four-wheel drive powertrain and suspension. In January 2017, French racecar manufacturer Oreca was selected as supplier.

R-GT was introduced to allow Grand Touring cars that competed in sports car racing to enter rallies. The R5 class was designed to replace Super 2000 cars, and its regulations were introduced in 2013. Prior to 2014, there was no specific championship for cars entered under R-GT regulations, and R-GT cars were ineligible to score points in any existing championship outside the World Rally Championship. The FIA R-GT Cup for R-GT cars started in 2015, sharing some events from the WRC and ERC events.

The World Rally Championship has historically had specific support championships that each class has been eligible for. Cars classified as R1, R2 and R3 contested the WRC3 Championship for two-wheel drive cars between 2013 and 2018; specially-prepared R3T, later R2B cars, were also used in the Junior WRC. Cars classified as R5 compete in WRC2; and WRC3 in 2020 and 2021, whilst regional championships may allow R5 alongside existing Super 2000 and Group N Production Cars. Cars classified as R-GT competed in the R-GT Cup until it ceased at the end of the 2022 competition.

=== Summary ===
FIA Sporting Class	Group R Class	Engine capacity	Engine type	Fuel	Minimum weight	Drivetrain	Homologation requirement	Championship eligibility	Example
RC2	R5	1600cc	Turbocharged	Petrol	1230 kg	Four-wheel drive	2500 per year	WRC2 (Note: Previously eligible to compete in the WRC 2 Pro and WRC3.)	Škoda Fabia R5
RC2	R4	Over 2000cc	Turbocharged	Petrol	1300 kg	Four-wheel drive	2500 per year	none (Note: Previously eligible to compete in WRC2.)	Subaru Impreza R4
RC4 (Note: R3 cars were originally RC3 but were reclassified to RC4 in 2021.)	R3T	Up to 1620cc	Turbocharged	Petrol	1080 kg	Two-wheel drive	2500 per year	none (Note: Previously eligible to compete in WRC3 and Junior WRC.)	Citroën DS3 R3T
RC4	R3C	1600cc to 2000cc	Naturally aspirated	Petrol	1080 kg	Two-wheel drive	2500 per year	none (Note: Previously eligible to compete in WRC3.)	Renault Clio R3C
RC4	R3C	1067cc to 1333cc	Turbocharged	Petrol	1080 kg	Two-wheel drive	2500 per year	none	none
RC4	R3D	Up to 2000cc	Supercharged	Diesel	1150 kg	Two-wheel drive	2500 per year	none	Fiat Grande Punto R3D
RC4	R2B	1390cc to 1600cc	Naturally aspirated	Petrol	1030 kg	Two-wheel drive	2500 per year	none (Note: Previously eligible to compete in Junior WRC.)	Ford Fiesta 1.6 R2
RC4	R2B	927cc to 1067cc	Turbocharged	Petrol	1030 kg	Two-wheel drive	2500 per year	none	Ford Fiesta Ecoboost R2
RC4	R2C	1600cc to 2000cc	Naturally aspirated	Petrol	1080 kg	Two-wheel drive	2500 per year	none	none
RC4	R2C	1067cc to 1333cc	Turbocharged	Petrol	1080 kg	Two-wheel drive	2500 per year	none	none
RC5	R1A	Up to 1390cc	Naturally aspirated	Petrol	980 kg	Two-wheel drive	2500 per year	none	Toyota TMG Yaris R1A
RC5	R1A	Up to 927cc	Turbocharged	Petrol	980 kg	Two-wheel drive	2500 per year	none	none
RC5	R1B	1390cc to 1600cc	Naturally aspirated	Petrol	1030 kg	Two-wheel drive	2500 per year	none	Renault Twingo RS R1
RC5	R1B	927cc to 1067cc	Turbocharged	Petrol	1030 kg	Two-wheel drive	2500 per year	none	none
R-GT		No limit	Turbocharged or supercharged	Petrol	3.4 kg/hp	Two-wheel drive	n/a	R-GT Cup	Lotus Exige R-GT

== Models ==
The following models have been homologated by the FIA under Group R regulations:

=== R1 ===
Manufacturer	Model	Image
(France) Citroën	Citroën DS3	
(United Kingdom) Ford	Ford Fiesta Mk 6	
(France) Renault	Renault Twingo II	
(Japan) Suzuki	Suzuki Baleno	
(Japan) Suzuki	Suzuki Swift Italian homologation	
(Japan) Toyota	Toyota Vitz	
(Japan) Toyota	Toyota Yaris	

=== R2 ===
Manufacturer	Model	Image
(France) Citroën	Citroën C2	
(United Kingdom) Ford	Ford Fiesta Mk 6	
(Germany) Opel	Opel Adam	
(France) Peugeot	Peugeot 208	
(France) Renault	Renault Twingo II	
(Czech Republic) Škoda	Škoda Fabia	
(Japan) Suzuki	Suzuki Swift	

=== R3 ===
Manufacturer	Model	Image
(France) Citroën	Citroën DS3 R3T	
(Italy) Fiat	Fiat Abarth 500 R3T	
(Italy) Fiat	Fiat Grande Punto R3D	
(Japan) Honda	Honda Civic R3C	
(France) Peugeot	Peugeot 207 R3T	
(France) Renault	Renault Clio III R3C	
(France) Renault	Renault Clio IV R3T	
(Japan) Toyota	Toyota GT86 R3C	

=== R4 ===
Based on Group N

Manufacturer	Model	Image
(Japan) Mitsubishi	Mitsubishi Lancer Evolution IX	
(Japan) Mitsubishi	Mitsubishi Lancer Evolution X	
(Japan) Subaru	Subaru Impreza WRX STI 3rd Gen.	
(Japan) Subaru	Subaru WRX STI 4th Gen.	

New vehicles under the FIA R4 Kit project in partnership with Oreca:

Model	Developer	Image	FIA Registered
Audi A1 SSM R4	Signed Streets Motorsport		Yes
Dacia Sandero R4	(digital concept by Oreca)		Yes
Fiat 500X R4	(digital concept by Oreca)		Yes
Ford Fiesta R4	Offered by Rally Technic		
Hyundai i20 R4	Rally Technic		
Lada Kalina R4	(digital concept by Oreca)		
Mazda 2 R4	Rally Technic		
Mini One F56 Rally2-Kit			Yes
Nissan Micra R4	(digital concept by Dytko Sport)		
Škoda Fabia R4	Proracing Engineering		Yes
Suzuki Swift R4LLY S	R-Technology		Yes
Toyota Etios R4	Rally Technic		Yes
Toyota Yaris R4	Evolve Motorsport; Victor Cartier; Offered by Rally Technic		Yes
Volkswagen Polo R4	Offered by Rally Technic		

=== R5 ===
Cars approved for competition in WRC2 and other R5 based championships:

Manufacturer	Car	Debut	Image
(France) Citroën	Citroën DS3 R5	2012	
(France) Citroën	Citroën C3 R5	2018	
(United Kingdom) Ford	Ford Fiesta R5	2013	
(South Korea) Hyundai	Hyundai i20 R5	2018	
(France) Peugeot	Peugeot 208 T16 R5	2014	
(Malaysia) Proton	Proton Iriz R5	2017	
(Czech Republic) Škoda	Škoda Fabia R5	2015	
(Germany) Volkswagen	Volkswagen Polo GTI R5	2018	

Cars that are homologated with national ASNs may compete at national level, or with FIA approval may compete in FIA Regional Championships (European Rally Trophy, African Rally Championship, Asia-Pacific Rally Championship, Codasur South American Rally Championship and NACAM Rally Championship), as per Article 12.3 of the FIA Regional Rally Sporting Regulations:

Manufacturer	Car	Debut	Image
(Japan) Mitsubishi	Mitsubishi Mirage R5	2014	
(Germany) Opel	Opel Corsa R5	2017	
(Japan) Toyota	Toyota Etios R5	2016	

=== R-GT ===
Manufacturer	Car	Image
(Italy) Abarth	Abarth 124 Spider	
(France) Alpine	Alpine A110 Rally	
(United Kingdom) Aston Martin	Aston Martin Vantage V8 R-GT	
(United Kingdom) Lotus	Lotus Exige R-GT	
(Germany) Porsche	Porsche 911 GT3	
(Germany) Porsche	Porsche Cayman GT4 (Typ 981c)	
