= Rally Pyramid =

Rally car technical specifications by FIA

The FIA's Rally Pyramid is the collective description and organisation of championships, car performance classes and driver aptitude in international rallying. In 2019 FIA rally commission presented a radical overhaul to the rally pyramid to introduce common nomenclature and structure of the international championships and car classes used across the sport in a similar way to terminology used in formula racing. At the top of the pyramid, Rally1 describes elite level of driver aptitude and car performance in the World Rally Championship (WRC). At the foot of the pyramid is Rally5, designed for cost effective introductory rallying competition.

Each of the new tiers of the pyramid align numerically with the existing FIA sporting classes introduced in 2014. Existing rally cars not in the new Groups Rally and within their homologation period are still eligible to compete and thus are still included in the rally pyramid even if not actively promoted by the FIA. It may be that a particular group or class will be removed from the pyramid when all those cars' homologation periods ends. All the car groups and classes permitted in FIA competition are described in this article under the sporting classes RC1 to RC5 as per the FIA sporting regulations.

== History ==
Groups A, B and N were introduced in 1982 to replace the numbered groups in existence. Each had 4 classes based on engine capacity which was corrected by x1.4 when a turbo or supercharger was used. N1 to N4, A5 to A8 and B9 to B12 were each based on less than 1400cc, 1401-1600cc, 1601-2000cc and greater than 2000cc respectively. Group B were banned from the WRC in 1986 on safety grounds, with the planned introduction of Group S abandoned, and the correction factor for turbocharged engines was increased to x1.7. From 1987, only Group A and Group N were permitted in the WRC, with a new Production Cup introduced solely for the often lower performance Group N cars. The cup was later renamed to the Production World Rally Championship.

The World Rally Car formula was introduced in 1997 for use at World Rally Championship level and not in championships elsewhere. The formula was to level the competition in the manufacturers championship by replacing the many different forms of car permitted by Group A. Two-wheel drive Group A kit cars, used in the 2-litre Cup from 1993 to 1999, could often outpace the four-wheel drive World Rally Cars in asphalt stages, including winning two rallies outright. The relaxed rules in the kit car category also resulted in unfair competition and high development costs with some manufacturers using it to promote their two-wheel drive models instead of entering the main WRC manufacturer class. This resulted in the ending of the cup.

In the 2000s, Super 2000 (S2000) and Super 1600 (S1600) cars became popular across motorsport and were also accepted into rallying as replacements for the kit-cars. The FIA introduced a new Junior World Rally Championship in 2001 solely for the Super 1600 cars. In 2010 a new SWRC championship was introduced for the S2000 cars which were in between Group N and the World Rally Car in terms of performance.

Group R was created to replace Groups A and N and was specifically for rally cars. It had 5 basic classes but not all were equally successful. The two wheel drive classes (R1, R2 and R3) arrived in 2008, 5 years before the four wheel drive classes (R4 and R5) and each had their regulations changed over time. At first R1, R2 and R3 (and sub-classes) were split between N and A sporting classes which did not fit the ethos of Group R being a replacement for those Groups. R3 cars, though not hugely unsuccessful, were often overlooked after R2 presumably because a driver was looking to progress to four wheel drive, or R1 and R2 were overlooked if a driver went straight to R3 which was the case when Citroën ran JWRC.

=== 2011 changes ===
In 2011 an entirely new class structure was employed with the simultaneous introduction of a new 1.6 L World Rally Car based on S2000 body-kits, and SWRC and PWRC rules were also relaxed to allow cars from Groups R, N and A to compete. There were then 11 classes, ten being numbered from 1 to 10, and WRC. The classes were based on car performance, rising from 10 to 1, then WRC. The 4 classes of Group N stepped from 10,9,8 to 3 whilst Group R rose from 10,9,6,5,2. Group A rose from 7 to 5 as the A8 group over 2000cc were banned. (Note: The new World Rally Car at 1600cc multiplied by 1.7 for turbo correction is still considered 2720cc by the FIA. They were put in new class 'WRC'. All other A8 cars were banned.) New R-GT were in their own class of 4 whilst S2000 were split between 2 and 3. Some events ran without enough entrants to justify the class competition. Class 8 was only for Group N cars which were intended to be replaced. Their names no longer apt, SWRC and PWRC became WRC2 and WRC3 in 2013.

During the years 2006 to 2012, the Intercontinental Rally Challenge ran featuring the same mix of cars as the World and European championships. The challenge was made for TV and attracted fans and top drivers alike. In 2013 it effectively merged with the European Rally Championship when promotor Eurosport took on the promotion rights for the latter.

R4 of Group R was designed around the Group N ruleset it intended to replace and was not successful for professional teams and prestige championships. The FIA abandoned this idea and no new R4 cars were homologated after 2015 as R4-Kit was the preferred path, R4 could then not be run in Europe. Privateers competing with older Group N cars were still allowed to run as an 'NR4' car. R4-Kit cars were smaller and allowed independent teams to purchase a kit to build a rally car.

=== RC sporting classes ===
In 2014 the RC classes that exist today were introduced and these will remain into the future. RC5 to RC1 were still tiers of performance though Group R cars were mostly categorised inversely to their numbers. R1, R2 and R3 were in RC5, RC4 and RC3 respectively. R4 and R5 were both in RC2 whilst the World Rally Car occupied RC1. R5 became hugely popular as a replacement for the high performance S2000. This resulted in star drivers in R5 factory teams in the same sporting class as privateer enthusiasts who had built their own R4 car.

In 2017 the fourth iteration WRC, 'WRC+', was introduced with increased engine performance. This car could not be run by anybody other than the manufacturers registered in WRC and drivers had to receive approval by the FIA. Volkswagen left the WRC championship after their diesel emissions scandal, followed by Citroën in 2019. Lower costs and new technologies were cited in calls for a new car used in the manufacturer's championship. Slower and older WRC cars were and are still permitted by privateers.

As recently as 2018 the WRC allowed S2000 cars, Group R and Group N to compete at RC2 level together. Super 1600 and Group R could also compete together at RC3 level, while Group A, Group R, Group N and kit cars could compete at RC2 level. Meanwhile, the level of progression in the European Championship stepped up from 2wd R2 in ERC3, to a mix of Group N and R-GT machinery in ERC2, with Group R5 cars leading amongst others in ERC1. The other regional championships had their own structures of championships and categories too. APRC2 and ERT2 used two-wheel-drive cars, whereas ERC2, ARC2 and MERC2 used four-wheel-drive. Each of the Junior championships had different rules and the Codasur region had championships for each sporting classification, the only region to do so. The continents also have their own manufacturing industries and consumer and rallyist car preferences. Each regional championship outside Europe permits additional local cars to compete and this will likely continue with the intended goal of enhanced participation.

An example route of progression for a driver aiming to be World Champion may have been via RC4 class Group R, R2 category in ERC3, followed by a 4WD Group N car (re-homologated in R4 in Group R) in ERC2, upgrading to RC2 category Group R, R5 class in WRC2 or ERC1 then finally progressing to a WRC (car) in the WRC (championship).

=== 2019 changes to the rally pyramid ===
==== Groups Rally ====
Each tier of the new pyramid includes its own specification of car known as one of the Groups Rally, with each of the groups' names synonymous with the tier of the pyramid. Groups Rally3 to Rally5 have classes within the group for minor technical or regulatory purposes but there is no difference in competitive eligibility within each group. These groups are promoted by the FIA as the new standard progression for a rally driver's international career and give clear vision to the rally car manufacturing industry of the future standards of rallying. The biggest differences between each group of cars is the performance and the costs involved to manufacture, run and maintain them.

Summary of the new groups in the FIA Rally Pyramid
Group	Sp. Class	Drivetrain	Aptitude	Weight/Power (KG/HP)	Formerly	Introduction
Rally1	RC1	4WD	Elite	3.1	WRC (Note: Although the information in this table was gathered from the FIA, the specifications of the new Rally1 are radically different from the outgoing World Rally Car.)	2022
Rally2	RC2	4WD	Performance	4.2	R5	2013
Rally3	RC3	4WD	Access	5.6	Group N (Note: Group N regulations are not involved in Rally3; this cell is populated only to describe the purpose of the class/tier as in FIA releases.)	2021
Rally4	RC4	2WD	Performance	5.1	R2	2019
Rally5	RC5	2WD	Access	6.4	R1	2019

With the launch of the Rally Pyramid in 2019, three classes of Group R (including any sub-classes) were immediately renamed to new Groups Rally. R1, R2 and R5 became the technical standard for Groups Rally5, Rally4 and Rally2 respectively. Group Rally1 cars would replace the existing World Rally Car with new regulations in the 2022 WRC season. The newly created Group Rally3 introduced a brand new car in 2021.
