= Lungarno della Zecca Vecchia =

Street in Florence, Italy

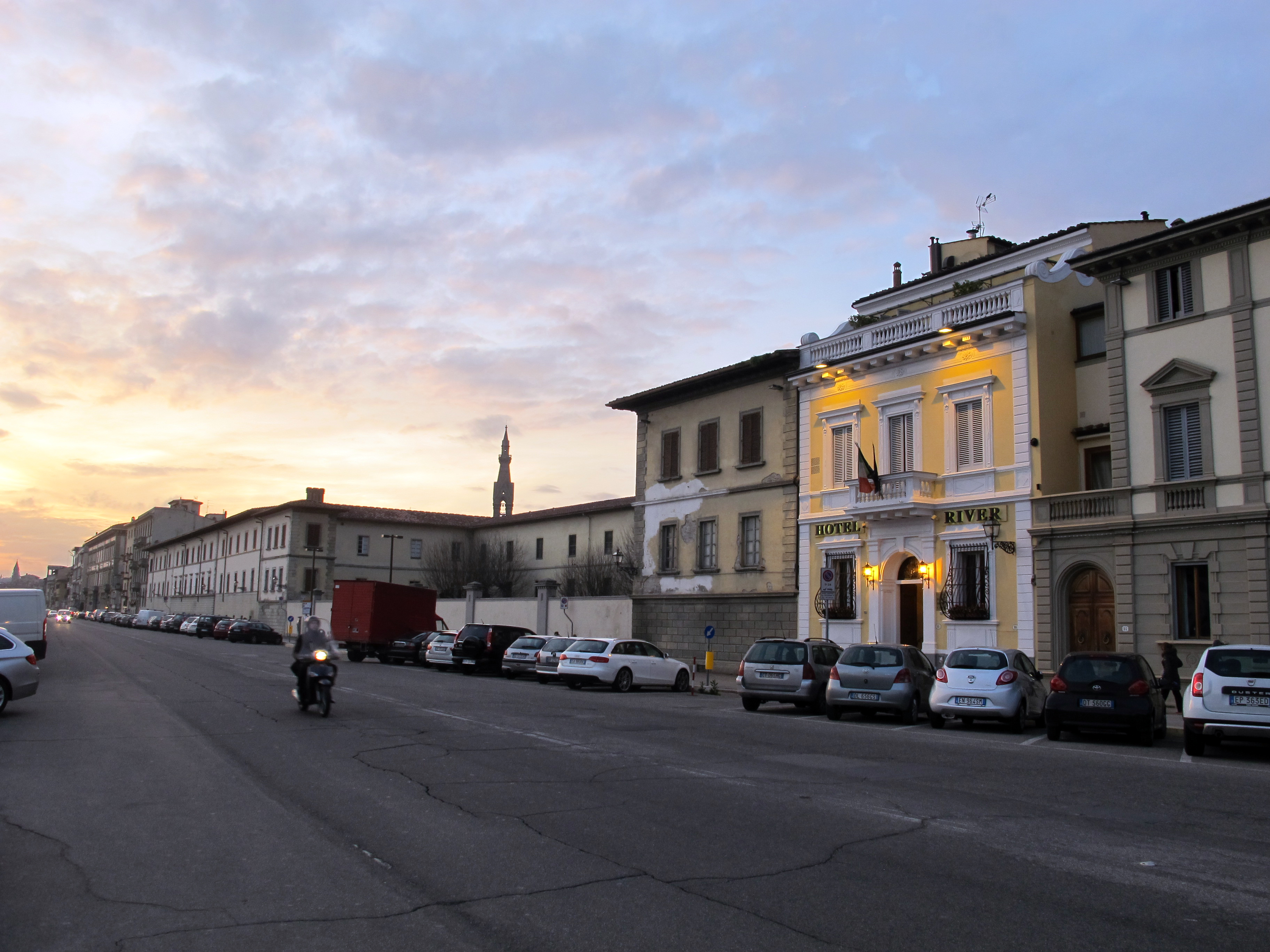
The Lungarno della Zecca Vecchia.

Lungarno della Zecca Vecchia is the stretch of the bank of the river Arno in Florence between the Torre della Zecca in Piazza Piave and the National Central Library in Piazza dei Cavalleggeri. It opened as Lungarno della Torricella after the 1867 resolution, initially named after the Toricella Hospital.
