= Fiuggi =

- Comune
- Comune di Fiuggi
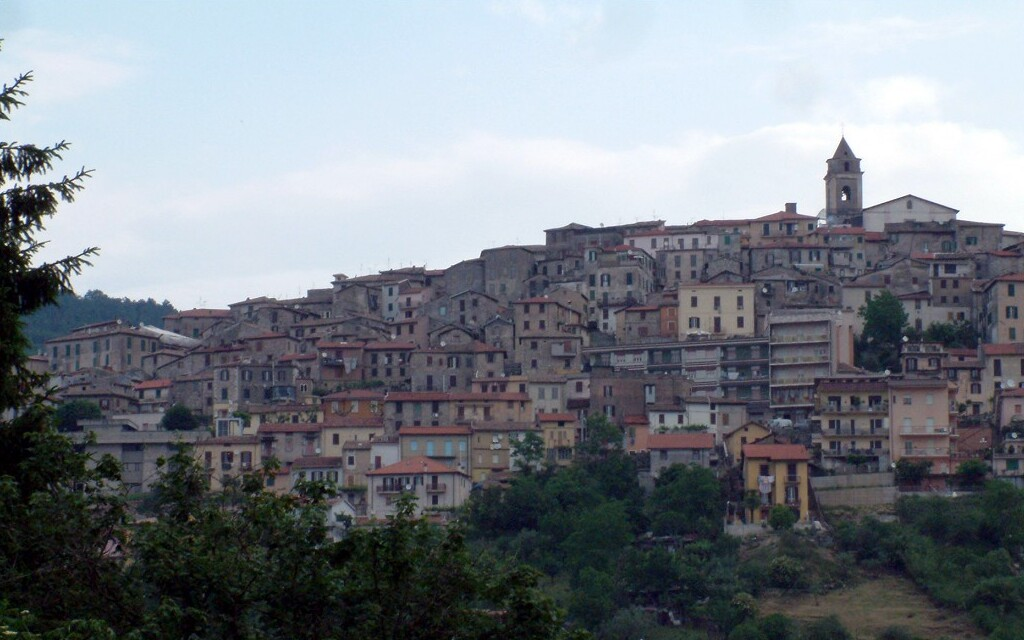
- View of Fiuggi

- Coat of arms

- Location within Italy Location within Lazio
- Coordinates: 41°48′N 13°13′E
- Country: Italy
- Region: Lazio
- Province: Frosinone (FR)

Government
  - Mayor: Alioska Baccarini

Area
  - Total: 33 km^{2} (13 sq mi)
- Elevation: 747 m (2,451 ft)

Population (15 november 2025)
  - Total: 11,531
  - Density: 350/km^{2} (910/sq mi)
- Demonym: Fiuggini
- Time zone: UTC+1 (CET)
  - Summer (DST): UTC+2 (CEST)
- Postal code: 03014
- Dialing code: 0775
- Patron saint: St. Blaise
- Saint day: 3 February
- Website: Official website

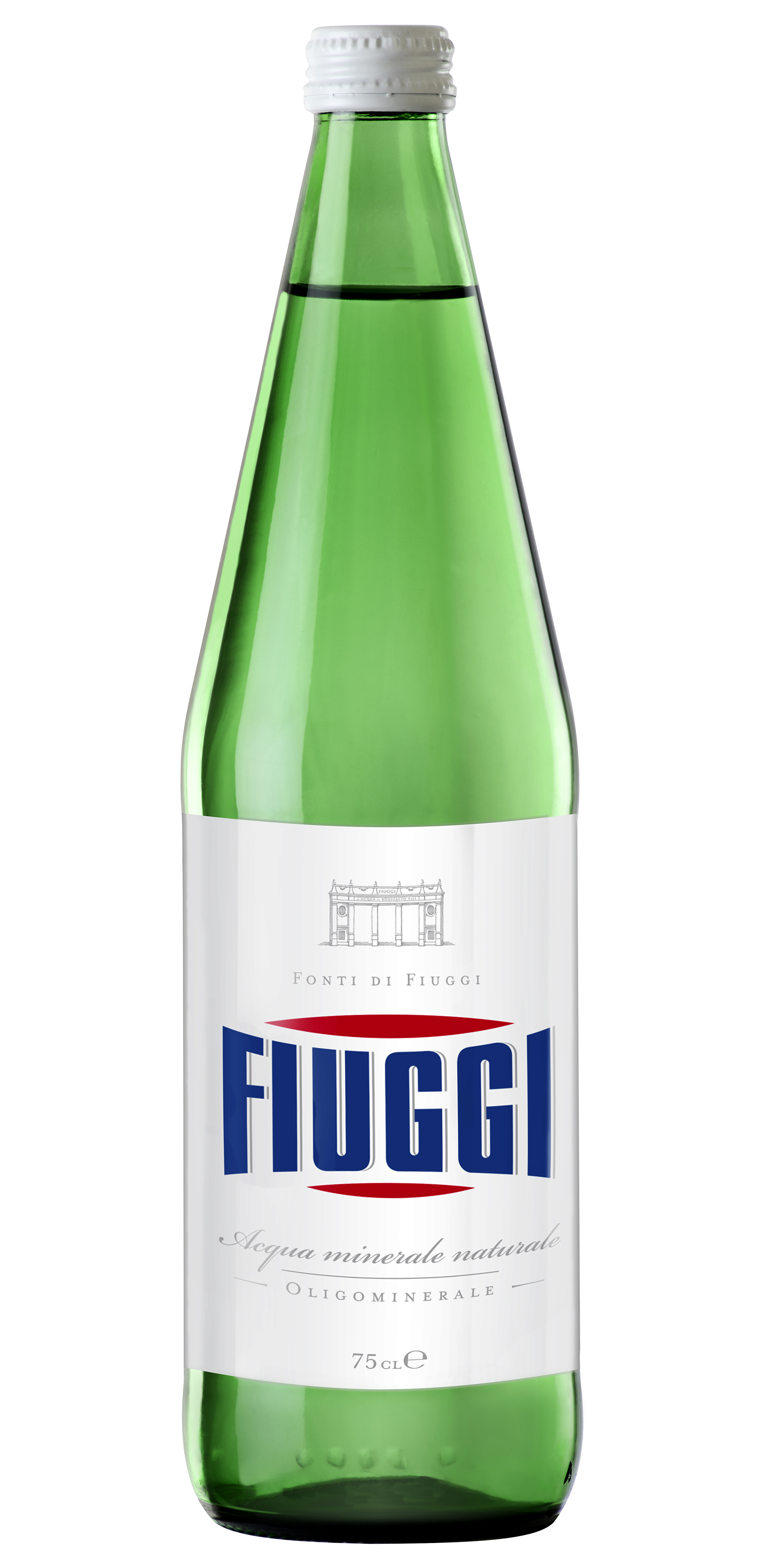
Fiuggi Water

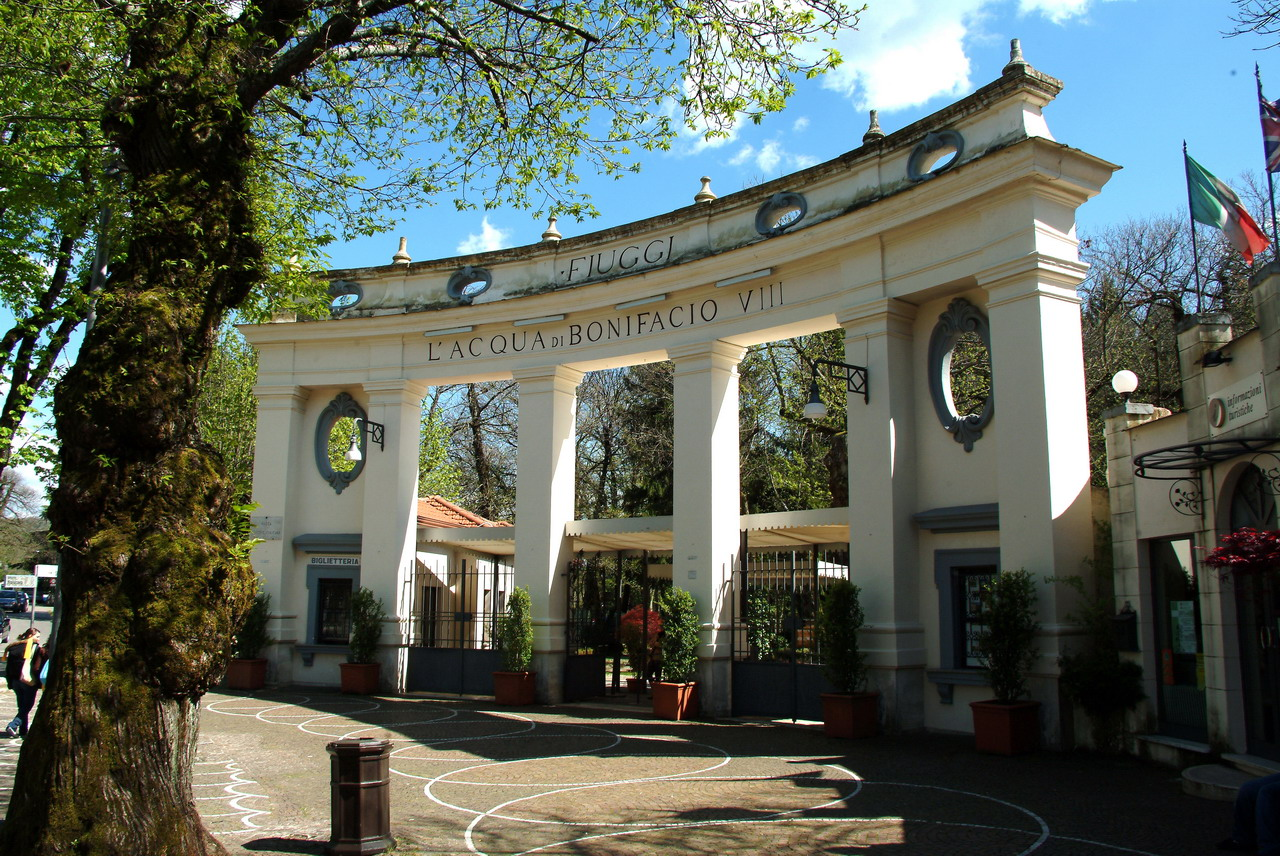
Thermae of Boniface VIII

Fiuggi (Central-Northern Latian dialect: Fiuio) is a comune (municipality) in the province of Frosinone, in the Italian region of Latium. The town of Fiuggi became famous for its Acqua di Fiuggi (Fiuggi Water), which flows from its natural springs and mountains. The water has been used in Italy since as early as the 14th century and is famous for its purported healing properties.

== History ==
Fiuggi, originally called Anticoli di Campagna, gained fame as early as the 14th century, when Pope Boniface VIII claimed his kidney stones had been healed by the mineral waters from the nearby Fiuggi spring. Two centuries later Michelangelo also extolled the virtues of the water that cured him of what he called "the only kind of stone I couldn't love". Soon Acqua di Fiuggi was being sent in bottles to all of Europe's royalty. Not until the turn of the 20th century did it become fashionable to make pilgrimages to spa towns, and it was around this time that the King of Italy renamed Anticoli in honor of its most celebrated attraction – the Fiuggi Water.

From the 16th to the 19th centuries, Fiuggi and many nearby hill towns were part of the Papal States. Unlike its neighbors, Anticoli di Campagna provided a source of revenue through the sales of its miraculous waters, and so it was often "bestowed" upon noble families in payment for services rendered. Sometimes these aristocrats didn't bother to visit the town, but they always sent a delegate to make sure none, or few, of the profits stayed in town. These upper-class outsiders slowly covered the original medieval walls with painted plaster similar to that found in present-day Rome, changing the appearance of the town.

=== 21st century ===
In November 2024, the foreign ministers of the EU met in Fiuggi, resolving to support a ceasefire between Israel and Hezbollah.

== Acqua di Fiuggi ==
The Acqua di Fiuggi ("Fiuggi's Water") source runs through ancient volcanic deposits in the Ernici mountains, which has an ecosystem that has historically been unaltered by humans. In Europe it is classified as an oligomineral water, and has been proven to contain certain components of the "humic substance" group which, it is claimed, gives the water its health benefits.

== Main sights ==
Fiuggi is divided into two parts: upper and lower. The area where the springs are located is called new Fiuggi, or Fiuggi Fonte at the base of the hill (it was developed during the Middle Ages so it is not all that new). The upper part, or old Fiuggi, is 760 metres (2,500 ft) above sea level. The natives call it "Fiuggi Citta". Fiuggi Città is a medieval fortified village, which was around even before Roman times

Main attractions include:

- Fonte Bonifacio
- Fonte Anticolana
- Terme di Fiuggi – spa and golf center
- The tiny church of Santa Maria del Colle
- The church of San Biagio, even though it was rebuilt in the 17th century, still preserves some fresco paintings of Giotto's scholars
- The cast iron fountain in Piazza Piave was erected in 1907 to celebrate the arrival of running water. The town owes its existence to the abundant springs running below the hill.
- The ornate Palazzo Falconi is at the center of the ancient town. The building has the legend that Napoleon Bonaparte slept there.
- The former Grand Hotel is now the municipal theatre
- The church of San Pietro is built on the ruins of the ancient castle. The actual bell tower was one of the towers of the former castle.
- Jewish ghetto and a menorah depiction on the wall of the street from the 13th century

Fiuggi is home to several spas that incorporate the Fiuggi water as part of their hydrotherapy treatment.

== Culture ==
The town is linked with the legend of the stuzze, in which Saint Blaise, in order to save the town from the assault of enemy troops, had fake flames appear on the town, deceiving the invaders and convincing them that the town had been already sacked. The miracle is today celebrated every February 2, when wooden pyramids are burned in the principal square of the town to remember the event.

== Dialect ==
The local dialect is a variant of the Central Italian dialect. Specifically, the city is in the Central-Northern Latian area.

== International relations ==
=== Twin towns – sister cities ===
Fiuggi is twinned with:

- Helmstedt, Germany
- Santo Domingo, Dominican Republic
- Tarrafal de São Nicolau, Cape Verde
- Canistro, Italy
