= 2026 European Rally Championship =

74th season of the FIA European Rally Championship

The 2026 FIA European Rally Championship was the 74th season of the European Rally Championship, a European continental rallying series in rallying organised by the Fédération Internationale de l'Automobile (FIA) and WRC Promoter GmbH. The season was also the thirteenth following the merge between the European Rally Championship and the Intercontinental Rally Challenge.

Mikołaj Marczyk and Szymon Gospodarczyk were the reigning European drivers' and co-drivers' champions.

== Categories ==
- FIA European Championship for Drivers, Co-Drivers and Teams: Main open championship for all current FIA-homologated cars within sporting classes RC2 to RC5, with Rally2 cars the leading contenders. A team may nominate a maximum of three cars (from all categories) for the teams' championship, with the two highest-placed cars counting for points.
- FIA ERC3 for Drivers and Co-Drivers: Second tier, specifically for the Rally3 class.
- FIA ERC4 for Drivers and Co-Drivers: Third tier, meant for front-wheel-drive cars. Allows Rally4, Rally5 and Rally6 cars.
- FIA Junior ERC: For drivers aged 27 and under on 1 January 2026 in Rally4 and Rally5 cars.
- FIA Master ERC: for drivers over the age of 50 at the start of the season.
- FIA ERC Fiesta Rally3 Trophy: For crews driving the Ford Fiesta Rally3. The winner of the trophy will get a funded prize drive with the Ford Fiesta Rally2 at the 2026 Rali Ceredigion.
- FIA Tyre Suppliers' Trophy: A nominated tyre supplier may score points with the two best placed Rally2 cars registered in ERC.

== Calendar ==
The 2026 season was contested over seven rounds across Central, Northern, Western and Southern Europe.

Round	Start date	Finish date	Rally	Rally headquarters	Surface	Stages	Distance	Ref.
1	17 April	19 April	(Spain) Andalusia Rally Sierra Morena	Córdoba, Andalusia, Spain	Tarmac	13	203.80 km	
2	22 May	24 May	(Sweden) Royal Rally of Scandinavia	Karlstad, Värmland County, Sweden	Gravel	16	185.94 km	
3	3 July	5 July	(Italy) Rally di Roma Capitale	Rome, Lazio, Italy	Tarmac	11	197.02 km	
4	24 July	26 July	Rally Poland	Katowice, Silesian Voivodeship, Poland	Tarmac	15	187.00 km	
5	14 August	16 August	(Czech Republic) Barum Czech Rally Zlín	Zlín, Zlín Region, Czechia	Tarmac	13	205.79 km	
6	4 September	6 September	(United Kingdom) Rali Ceredigion	Aberystwyth, Wales, United Kingdom	Tarmac	16	191.34 km	
7	23 October	25 October	Rally Six Cities North of Portugal	Fafe, Braga, Portugal	Gravel	17	181.10 km	

The following round was included on the original calendar published by WRC Promoter GmbH, but was later cancelled:

Start date	Finish date	Rally	Rally headquarters	Surface	Stages	Distance	Cancellation reason	Ref.
20 March	22 March	Rally Hungary	Veszprém, Veszprém County, Hungary	Gravel	—N/a	—N/a	Financial issues	

=== Calendar changes ===
- The Rally Hungary was set to be the season opener, however it was later cancelled reportedly due to financial issues. The Andalusia Rally Sierra Morena replaced it as the first round of the season.
- The Rally di Roma Capitale moved its headquarters from Fiuggi to Rome, ahead of the event joining the WRC in 2027.
- The Rally Poland also moved its headquarters from Mikołajki to Katowice, which hosted Rally Silesia in 2024. This also marked the event surface changing from gravel to tarmac for the first time since 2004.
- The Rally Six Cities North of Portugal joined the calendar, replacing the Croatia Rally as the season finale.

== Entrants ==
=== ERC ===
Rally2 entries
Entrant	Car	Driver	Co-Driver	Tyres	Rounds	Category
(Czech Republic) Agrotec Škoda Rally Team	Škoda Fabia RS Rally2	(Czech Republic) Jan Kopecký	(Czech Republic) Jiří Hovorka	M	5	
(Czech Republic) Auto Podbabská Škoda Team	Škoda Fabia RS Rally2	(Czech Republic) Dominik Stříteský	(Czech Republic) Ondřej Krajča	M	1, 3–5 (Note: The crew appeared on the entry list for the Barum Czech Rally Zlín, but were withdrawn before the start.)	
(Slovakia) Chooligan Racing Team	Škoda Fabia RS Rally2	(Poland) Zbigniew Gabryś	(Poland) Adrian Sadowski	—N/a	4 (Note: The crew appeared on the entry list for the Rally Poland, but were withdrawn before the start.)	Master ERC
(Slovakia) Chooligan Racing Team	Hyundai i20 N Rally2	(Slovakia) Robert Kolčák	(Slovakia) Julius Lapdavský	M	1	
(Slovakia) Chooligan Racing Team	Škoda Fabia RS Rally2	(Slovakia) Robert Kolčák	(Slovakia) Julius Lapdavský	M	2, 5	
(Czech Republic) EuroOil Team	Citroën C3 Rally2	(Czech Republic) Václav Pech	(Czech Republic) Petr Uhel	M	5	
Equipe de France Espoir FFSA	Škoda Fabia RS Rally2	(France) Tristan Charpentier	(France) Florian Barral	M	3	
Equipe de France Espoir FFSA	Toyota GR Yaris Rally2	(France) Eliott Delecour	(France) Fabrice Gordon	M	3	
Equipe de France Espoir FFSA	Hyundai i20 N Rally2	(France) Arthur Pelamourgues	(France) Bastien Pouget	M	3, 7	
Equipe de France Espoir FFSA	Lancia Ypsilon Rally2 HF Integrale	(France) Léo Rossel	(France) Florian Barral	H	7	
Equipe de France Espoir FFSA	Škoda Fabia RS Rally2	(France) Sarah Rumeau	(France) Julie Amblard	M	7	
Equipe de France Espoir FFSA	Citroën C3 Rally2	(France) Pablo Sarrazin	(France) Yannick Roche	M	3	
Equipe de France Espoir FFSA	Lancia Ypsilon Rally2 HF Integrale	(France) Pablo Sarrazin	(France) Yannick Roche	M	7	
GK Door Team Sweden	Toyota GR Yaris Rally2	(Sweden) Calle Carlberg	(Norway) Jørgen Eriksen	H	2	
GK Door Team Sweden	Toyota GR Yaris Rally2	(United Kingdom) Meirion Evans	(United Kingdom) Dale Furniss	P	6	
GK Door Team Sweden	Toyota GR Yaris Rally2	(Sweden) Patrik Hallberg	(Sweden) John Stigh	P	2	
(Hungary) H Rally Rent	Ford Fiesta Rally2	(Hungary) András Hadik	(Hungary) Attila Deák	P	1	Master ERC
(Hungary) H Rally Rent	Škoda Fabia RS Rally2	(Hungary) Gábor Német	(Hungary) Gergely Németh	P	3–5	
(Sweden) JC Raceteknik	Škoda Fabia RS Rally2	(Sweden) Adam Grahn	(Sweden) Christoffer Bäck	H	1–2, 7	
(Sweden) JC Raceteknik	Škoda Fabia RS Rally2	(Czech Republic) Dominik Jakeš	(Czech Republic) Vítězslav Baďura	M	5	
(Sweden) JC Raceteknik	Škoda Fabia RS Rally2	(Sweden) Isak Reiersen	(Sweden) Stefan Gustavsson	H	1–5	
(Czech Republic) Kowax DST Racing	Hyundai i20 N Rally2	(Czech Republic) Matěj Manderla	(Czech Republic) Ondřej Vichtora	M	3	
(Czech Republic) Kowax DST Racing	Škoda Fabia RS Rally2	(United Kingdom) Max McRae	(United Kingdom) Cameron Fair	P	6	
(Czech Republic) Kowax DST Racing	Škoda Fabia RS Rally2	(Poland) Adam Sroka	(Poland) Patryk Kielar	M	4	
(Czech Republic) Kowax DST Racing	Hyundai i20 N Rally2	(Czech Republic) Martin Vlček	(Czech Republic) Jiří Skořepa	M	5	Master ERC
(Poland) KIQ Rally Team	Škoda Fabia RS Rally2	(Poland) Jarosław Kołtun	(Poland) Ireneusz Pleskot	M	4	
(Poland) KIQ Rally Team	Škoda Fabia RS Rally2	(Germany) Nicolas Otto	(Portugal) Hugo Magalhães	M	7	
(Poland) KIQ Rally Team	Hyundai i20 N Rally2	(Austria) Simon Wagner	(Germany) Hanna Ostlender	M	5	
(Italy) Lancia Corse HF	Lancia Ypsilon Rally2 HF Integrale	(Italy) Andrea Crugnola	(Italy) Luca Beltrame	P	3	
(Italy) Lancia Corse HF	Lancia Ypsilon Rally2 HF Integrale	(Bulgaria) Nikolay Gryazin	(Bulgaria) Konstantin Aleksandrov	H	3, 7	
(Italy) Lancia Corse HF	Lancia Ypsilon Rally2 HF Integrale	(Italy) Andrea Mabellini	(Italy) Virginia Lenzi	P	All	
(Italy) Lancia Corse HF	Lancia Ypsilon Rally2 HF Integrale	(France) Yohan Rossel	(France) Arnaud Dunand	H	3	
(Republic of Ireland) Motorsport Ireland Rally Academy	Škoda Fabia RS Rally2	(Republic of Ireland) Casey Jay Coleman	(Republic of Ireland) Killian McArdle	M	7	
(Republic of Ireland) Motorsport Ireland Rally Academy	Citroën C3 Rally2	(Republic of Ireland) William Creighton	(Republic of Ireland) Liam Regan	M	1–5	
(Czech Republic) Orsák Rallysport	Škoda Fabia RS Rally2	(France) Tristan Charpentier	(France) Loris Pascaud	M	1–2	
(Czech Republic) Orsák Rallysport	Škoda Fabia RS Rally2	(France) Tristan Charpentier	(Belgium) Renaud Jamoul	M	4–5	
(Czech Republic) Orsák Rallysport	Škoda Fabia RS Rally2	(Czech Republic) Tomáš Kurka	(Czech Republic) Karel Vajík	M	5	Master ERC
(Czech Republic) Orsák Rallysport	Škoda Fabia RS Rally2	(United Kingdom) Sam Touzel	(United Kingdom) Max Freeman	M	6	
(Spain) PH.Ph	Škoda Fabia RS Rally2	(Spain) Jan Solans	(Spain) Rodrigo Sanjuan	M	7	
(Hungary) PSZA Motorsport SE	Škoda Fabia RS Rally2	(Hungary) Gábor Német	(Hungary) Gergely Németh	M	7	
(Finland) Rautio Motorsport	Lancia Ypsilon Rally2 HF Integrale	(Finland) Tuukka Kauppinen	(Finland) Sebastian Virtanen	M	1	
(Finland) Rautio Motorsport	Lancia Ypsilon Rally2 HF Integrale	(Finland) Tuukka Kauppinen	(Finland) Topi Luhtinen	M	2–3, 5	
(Spain) Recalvi Team	Citroën C3 Rally2	(Spain) Jorge Cagiao	(Spain) Javier Martínez	M	1	
(Spain) Recalvi Team	Škoda Fabia RS Rally2	(Spain) José Antonio Suárez	(Spain) Alberto Iglesias	M	1	
(Czech Republic) Samohýl Škoda Team	Škoda Fabia RS Rally2	(Czech Republic) Adam Březík	(Czech Republic) Zdeněk Bělák	H	5	
(Hungary) Solution Proviser Now Kft.	Škoda Fabia RS Rally2	(Hungary) Gábor Német	(Hungary) Gergely Németh	P	1–2	
(India) Team MRF Tyres	Toyota GR Yaris Rally2	(Norway) Eyvind Brynildsen	(Sweden) Anders Erik Fredriksson	M	2	
(India) Team MRF Tyres	Hyundai i20 N Rally2	(Czech Republic) Erik Cais	(Slovakia) Igor Bacigál	M	1, 3–4, 6	
(India) Team MRF Tyres	Hyundai i20 N Rally2	(Czech Republic) Erik Cais	(Czech Republic) Daniel Trunkát	M	5	
(India) Team MRF Tyres	Škoda Fabia RS Rally2	(Estonia) Patrick Enok	(Estonia) Silver Simm	M	7	
(India) Team MRF Tyres	Škoda Fabia RS Rally2	(Romania) Andrei Gîrtofan	(Romania) Dorin Pulpea	M	1, 3–5, 7 (Note: The crew appeared on the entry list for the Andalusia Rally Sierra Morena, but were withdrawn before the start.)	
(India) Team MRF Tyres	Toyota GR Yaris Rally2	(Finland) Roope Korhonen	(Finland) Anssi Viinikka	M	7	
(India) Team MRF Tyres	Volkswagen Polo GTI R5	(Norway) Frank Tore Larsen	(Norway) Lars-Håkon Lundgreen	M	2	
(India) Team MRF Tyres	Škoda Fabia RS Rally2	(Latvia) Mārtiņš Sesks	(Latvia) Renārs Francis	M	2, 7	
(India) Team MRF Tyres	Škoda Fabia RS Rally2	(Romania) Simone Tempestini	(Romania) Sergiu Itu	M	1	
(India) Team MRF Tyres	Škoda Fabia RS Rally2	(Romania) Simone Tempestini	(Romania) Francesca Maior	M	2–7	
(India) Team MRF Tyres	Hyundai i20 N Rally2	(Czech Republic) Martin Vlček	(Czech Republic) Jiří Skořepa	M	6	Master ERC
(Portugal) The Racing Factory - Motorsport Solutions	Škoda Fabia RS Rally2	(Finland) Teemu Suninen	(Finland) Antti Haapala	P	1–6	
(Czech Republic) Toyota Dolák Rally Team	Toyota GR Yaris Rally2	(Czech Republic) Filip Mareš	(Czech Republic) Radovan Bucha	H	5	
(Spain) Toyota España	Toyota GR Yaris Rally2	(Spain) Iván Ares	(Spain) Borja Rozada	P	1	
Toyota Gazoo Racing Caetano Portugal	Toyota GR Yaris Rally2	(Portugal) Pedro Almeida	(Portugal) António Costa	P	7	
Toyota Gazoo Racing Caetano Portugal	Toyota GR Yaris Rally2	(Andorra) Kris Meeke	(United Kingdom) Stuart Loudon	M	7	
(Japan) Toyota Gazoo Racing WRT NG	Toyota GR Yaris Rally2	(Japan) Shotaro Goto	(Finland) Jussi Lindberg	P	2	
(Japan) Toyota Gazoo Racing WRT NG	Toyota GR Yaris Rally2	(Japan) Takumi Matsushita	(Finland) Pekka Kelander	P	2	
(Japan) Toyota Gazoo Racing WRT NG	Toyota GR Yaris Rally2	(Estonia) Jaspar Vaher	(Estonia) Rait Jansen	P	2	
(Italy) T-Racing SRL	Toyota GR Yaris Rally2	(France) Benjamin Boulenc	(France) Chloé Barozzi-Gauze	P	3	
(Italy) T-Racing SRL	Toyota GR Yaris Rally2	(Italy) Simone Campedelli	(Italy) Tania Canton	P	3	
(Poland) Villaria Rally Team	Škoda Fabia RS Rally2	(Poland) Piotr Krotoszyński	(Poland) Marcin Szeja	M	1	
Private Rally2 entries
Entered under driver's name	Ford Fiesta Rally2	(Poland) Tymoteusz Abramowski	(Poland) Jakub Wróbel	P	7	
Entered under driver's name	Toyota GR Yaris Rally2	(United Kingdom) Philip Allen	(United Kingdom) Craig Drew	M	1–4, 6 (Note: The crew appeared on the entry list for the Rali Ceredigion, but were withdrawn before the start.)	
Entered under driver's name	Škoda Fabia RS Rally2	(Italy) Fabio Andolfi	(Switzerland) Marco Menchini	P	3	
Entered under driver's name	Škoda Fabia RS Rally2	(Portugal) Armindo Araújo	(Portugal) Luís Ramalho	M	7	
Entered under driver's name	Škoda Fabia RS Rally2	(Italy) Boštjan Avbelj	(Italy) Elia De Guio	P	3	
Entered under driver's name	Škoda Fabia RS Rally2	(Italy) Giandomenico Basso	(Italy) Lorenzo Granai	P	1, 3	Master ERC
Entered under driver's name	Škoda Fabia RS Rally2	(Brazil) Cristian Baumgart	(Brazil) Luis Felipe Eckel	P	7	Master ERC
Entered under driver's name	Toyota GR Yaris Rally2	(Spain) Roberto Blach	(Spain) Daniel Sosa	M	1, 3–5, 7	
Entered under driver's name	Lancia Ypsilon Rally2 HF Integrale	(France) Yoann Bonato	(France) Benjamin Boulloud	M	3	
Entered under driver's name	Škoda Fabia RS Rally2	(Bolivia) Marco Bulacia	(Spain) Axel Coronado	P	1	
Entered under driver's name	Škoda Fabia RS Rally2	(Bolivia) Marco Bulacia	(Spain) Alejandro López	P	3	
Entered under driver's name	Škoda Fabia RS Rally2	(Bolivia) Marco Bulacia	(Spain) José Murado	P	4	
Entered under driver's name	Škoda Fabia RS Rally2	(Bolivia) Marco Bulacia	(Spain) David de La Puente	P	5	
Entered under driver's name	Citroën C3 Rally2	(Sweden) Calle Carlberg	(Norway) Jørgen Eriksen	H	1	
Entered under driver's name	Škoda Fabia RS Rally2	(Italy) Vittorio Ceccato	(Italy) Stefano Tiraboschi	P	3	Master ERC
Entered under driver's name	Toyota GR Yaris Rally2	(Portugal) Luís Cidade	(Portugal) Jorge Carvalho	M	7	
Entered under driver's name	Škoda Fabia RS Rally2	(France) Louis Constant	(France) Maxime Martini	P	3–4	
Entered under driver's name	Škoda Fabia RS Rally2	(Italy) Roberto Daprà	(Italy) Luca Guglielmetti	P	3	
Entered under driver's name	Škoda Fabia RS Rally2	(Republic of Ireland) Callum Devine	(Republic of Ireland) Noel O'Sullivan	M	1	
Entered under driver's name	Ford Fiesta Rally2	(Sweden) Kalle Gustafsson	(Sweden) Jim Hjerpe	H	2	
Entered under driver's name	Škoda Fabia RS Rally2	(Finland) Mikko Heikkilä	(Finland) Kristian Temonen	P	2	
Entered under driver's name	Škoda Fabia RS Rally2	(Sweden) Mille Johansson	(Sweden) Johan Grönvall	P	3	
Entered under driver's name	Toyota GR Yaris Rally2	(Poland) Kajetan Kajetanowicz	(Poland) Maciej Szczepaniak	P	4	
Entered under driver's name	Škoda Fabia RS Rally2	(Czech Republic) Filip Kohn	(Czech Republic) Petr Těšínský	P	5	
Entered under driver's name	Škoda Fabia RS Rally2	(Finland) Benjamin Korhola	(Finland) Patric Öhman	P	1–2	
Entered under driver's name	Škoda Fabia RS Rally2	(Sweden) Tim Liljegren	(Sweden) Sofie Sjöberg Karlsson	P	2	
Entered under driver's name	Škoda Fabia RS Rally2	(Netherlands) Joep Lüth	(Netherlands) Bart van Heun	M	3	
Entered under driver's name	Citroën C3 Rally2	(Italy) Filippo Marchino	(United States) Alexander Kihurani	P	3	
Entered under driver's name	Škoda Fabia RS Rally2	(Poland) Mikołaj Marczyk	(Poland) Szymon Gospodarczyk	M	1, 3–7	
Entered under driver's name	Škoda Fabia RS Rally2	(Poland) Mikołaj Marczyk	(Poland) Daniel Dymurski	M	2	
Entered under driver's name	Škoda Fabia RS Rally2	(Poland) Jakub Matulka	(Poland) Damian Syty	M	1–2, 5–7	
Entered under driver's name	Škoda Fabia RS Rally2	(Poland) Jakub Matulka	(Poland) Patryk Kielar	M	3	
Entered under driver's name	Škoda Fabia RS Rally2	(Poland) Jakub Matulka	(Poland) Daniel Dymurski	M	4	
Entered under driver's name	Toyota GR Yaris Rally2	(Andorra) Kris Meeke	(Republic of Ireland) Noel O'Sullivan	M	6	
Entered under driver's name	Škoda Fabia Rally2 evo	(Portugal) Guilherme Meireles	(Portugal) Pedro Alves	M	7	
Entered under driver's name	Toyota GR Yaris Rally2	(France) Adrien Mosca	(France) Julie Amblard	H	3	
Entered under driver's name	Toyota GR Yaris Rally2	(Estonia) Joosep Ralf Nõgene	(Estonia) Aleks Lesk	P	2	
Entered under driver's name	Škoda Fabia RS Rally2	(Mexico) Juan Carlos Peralta	(Mexico) Víctor Pérez Couto	P	3	Master ERC
Entered under driver's name	Toyota GR Yaris Rally2	(United Kingdom) Osian Pryce	(United Kingdom) James Morgan	M	6	
Entered under driver's name	Škoda Fabia RS Rally2	(France) Pierre Ragues	(France) Julien Pesenti	M	1–3, 6–7	
Entered under driver's name	Škoda Fabia RS Rally2	(Portugal) Rúben Rodrigues	(Portugal) Rui Raimundo	M	7	
Entered under driver's name	Škoda Fabia RS Rally2	(Italy) Antonio Rusce	(Italy) Gabriele Zanni	P	3	Master ERC
Entered under driver's name	Škoda Fabia RS Rally2	(Poland) Adrian Rzeźnik	(Poland) Kamil Kozdroń	P	1, 4	
Entered under driver's name	Škoda Fabia RS Rally2	(Canada) Brandon Semenuk	(United Kingdom) Keaton Williams	P	2	
Entered under driver's name	Škoda Fabia RS Rally2	(Canada) Brandon Semenuk	(United Kingdom) Keaton Williams	H	7	
Entered under driver's name	Škoda Fabia RS Rally2	(Italy) Liberato Sulpizio	(Italy) Manuel Fenoli	P	3	
Entered under driver's name	Škoda Fabia RS Rally2	(Poland) Jarosław Szeja	(Poland) Marcin Szeja	M	4	
Entered under driver's name	Škoda Fabia RS Rally2	(Czech Republic) Jaromír Tarabus	(Czech Republic) Petr Machů	H	5	
Entered under driver's name	Ford Fiesta Rally2	(Finland) Ville Vatanen	(Finland) Joonas Ojala	P	7	
Entered under driver's name	Škoda Fabia RS Rally2	(Paraguay) Fabrizio Zaldivar	(Italy) Marcelo Der Ohannesian	M	1–2	

=== ERC3 ===
Rally3 entries
Entrant	Car	Driver	Co-Driver	Tyres	Rounds	Category
(Croatia) AK Opatija Motorsport	Ford Fiesta Rally3	(Croatia) Jan Pokos	(Germany) Jara Hain	P	1	FRally3T
(Croatia) AK Opatija Motorsport	Ford Fiesta Rally3	(Croatia) Jan Pokos	(Germany) Anna-Maria Seidl	P	2	FRally3T
(Croatia) AK Opatija Motorsport	Renault Clio Rally3	(Austria) Roland Stengg	(Slovenia) Rebeka Kobal	P	5	
(Czech Republic) Duck Racing Autoklub v AČR	Ford Fiesta Rally3	(Czech Republic) Petr Kačírek	(Czech Republic) Ladislav Kučera	P	All	FRally3T
(Spain) Escudería Costa Nord C.E.	Ford Fiesta Rally3	(Spain) Joan Socías	(Spain) Diego Fuentes	P	1	FRally3T
(Poland) Grupa PGS Rally Team	Ford Fiesta Rally3	(Poland) Igor Widłak	(Poland) Daniel Dymurski	P	1, 5	FRally3T
(Poland) Grupa PGS Rally Team	Ford Fiesta Rally3	(Poland) Igor Widłak	(Poland) Kamil Heller	P	2–4 (Note: The crew appeared on the entry list for the Royal Rally of Scandinavia, but were withdrawn before the start.)	FRally3T
(Slovenia) IK Sport Racing	Ford Fiesta Rally3	(United Kingdom) Charlie Tuthill	(Republic of Ireland) Niall Burns	P	2	FRally3T
(Slovenia) IK Sport Racing	Ford Fiesta Rally3	(United Kingdom) Charlie Tuthill	(United Kingdom) Ross Whittock	P	3	FRally3T
(Slovenia) IK Sport Racing	Ford Fiesta Rally3	(United Kingdom) Charlie Tuthill	(Germany) Katrin Becker	P	5–6	FRally3T
(Republic of Ireland) Motorsport Ireland Rally Academy	Ford Fiesta Rally3	(Republic of Ireland) Cian Caldwell	(Republic of Ireland) Paul McPhillips	P	1–5	FRally3T
(Republic of Ireland) Motorsport Ireland Rally Academy	Ford Fiesta Rally3	(Republic of Ireland) Casey Jay Coleman	(Republic of Ireland) Killian McArdle	P	1–6	FRally3T
(Republic of Ireland) Motorsport Ireland Rally Academy	Ford Fiesta Rally3	(Republic of Ireland) Craig Rahill	(Republic of Ireland) Conor Smith	P	1–5	FRally3T
(Turkey) Team Petrol Ofisi	Renault Clio Rally3	(Turkey) Kerem Kazaz	(France) Corentin Silvestre	P	2	
(Japan) Toyota Gazoo Racing WRT NG	Renault Clio Rally3	(Japan) Rio Ogata	(Finland) Mikael Korhonen	P	7	
(Japan) Toyota Gazoo Racing WRT NG	Renault Clio Rally3	(Japan) Kanta Yanaguida	(Finland) Ville Mannisenmäki	P	7	
(Poland) Villaria Racing Team	Renault Clio Rally3	(Poland) Michał Chorbiński	(Poland) Adam Chrzanowski	P	4	
Private Rally3 entries
Entered under driver's name	Renault Clio Rally3	(Poland) Tomasz Bargiel	(Poland) Jakub Wróbel	P	4	
Entered under driver's name	Ford Fiesta Rally3	(Poland) Tadeusz Bieńko	(Poland) Michał Poradzisz	P	4–5	FRally3T
Entered under driver's name	Renault Clio Rally3	(Poland) Sebastian Butyński	(Poland) Łukasz Jastrzębski	P	1, 3	
Entered under driver's name	Renault Clio Rally3	(Poland) Sebastian Butyński	(Poland) Gracjan Predko	P	4	
Entered under driver's name	Renault Clio Rally3	(Poland) Sebastian Butyński	(Poland) Michał Jurgała	P	5	
Entered under driver's name	Ford Fiesta Rally3	(Italy) Matteo Fontana	(Italy) Alessandro Arnaboldi	M	3	
Entered under driver's name	Renault Clio Rally3	(Poland) Błażej Gazda	(Poland) Michał Jurgała	P	1, 3–4	
Entered under driver's name	Ford Fiesta Rally3	(Poland) Marcin Górny	(Poland) Mateusz Martynek	P	4	FRally3T
Entered under driver's name	Ford Fiesta Rally3	(Poland) Marcin Górny	(Poland) Jarosław Hryniuk	P	5	FRally3T
Entered under driver's name	Ford Fiesta Rally3	(Republic of Ireland) Kalum Graffin	(United Kingdom) Rhodri Evans	P	All	FRally3T
Entered under driver's name	Renault Clio Rally3	(Poland) Hubert Kowalczyk	(Poland) Jarosław Hryniuk	P	1	
Entered under driver's name	Renault Clio Rally3	(Austria) Maximilian Lichtenegger	(Austria) Bernhard Ettel	P	1–3	
Entered under driver's name	Ford Fiesta Rally3	(Germany) Nicolas Otto	(Portugal) Hugo Magalhães	M	3	
Entered under driver's name	Ford Fiesta Rally3	(United Kingdom) Robert Proudlock	(United Kingdom) Harry Marchbank	P	1–3	FRally3T
Entered under driver's name	Ford Fiesta Rally3	(Romania) Alexandra Teslovan	(Romania) Mihai Supuran	P	1, 3–5	FRally3T
Entered under driver's name	Renault Clio Rally3	(Bulgaria) Aleksandar Tomov	(Bulgaria) Nedyalko Sivov	P	1	
Entered under driver's name	Ford Fiesta Rally3	(Finland) Ville Vatanen	(Finland) Joonas Ojala	P	1–6	FRally3T
Entered under driver's name	Renault Clio Rally3	(France) Lucas Zielinski	(France) Ewen Leenhardt	M	1–5	

=== ERC4 ===
Rally4 and Rally5 entries
Entrant	Car	Driver	Co-Driver	Tyres	Rounds	Category
(Germany) ADAC Opel Rally Junior Team	Opel Corsa Rally4	(Belgium) Tom Heindrichs	(Luxembourg) Jonas Schmitz	H	2–7	ERC4J
(Germany) ADAC Opel Rally Junior Team	Opel Corsa Rally4	(United Kingdom) Ioan Lloyd	(United Kingdom) Sion Williams	H	6	ERC4J
(Germany) ADAC Opel Rally Junior Team	Opel Corsa Rally4	(Austria) Luca Pröglhöf	(Germany) Christina Ettel	H	5	ERC4J
(Germany) ADAC Opel Rally Junior Team	Opel Corsa Rally4	(Germany) Claire Schönborn	(Germany) Michael Wenzel	H	2–4, 6–7	ERC4J
(Germany) ADAC Opel Rally Junior Team	Opel Corsa Rally4	(Germany) Timo Schulz	(Germany) Maresa Lade	H	2–7	ERC4J
Equipe de France Espoir FFSA	Lancia Ypsilon Rally4 HF	(France) Alexandre Villiod	(France) Loris Pascaud	M	3	
(Slovenia) IK Sport Racing	Opel Corsa Rally4	(Norway) Karl Peder Nordstrand	(Norway) Sunniva Rudi	H	2–5	ERC4J
(Slovenia) IK Sport Racing	Opel Corsa Rally4	(Norway) Karl Peder Nordstrand	(Sweden) Jonas Andersson	H	7	ERC4J
(Italy) Lancia Corse HF	Lancia Ypsilon Rally4 HF	(Italy) Francesco Dei Ceci	(Italy) Danilo Fappani	H	1–2	ERC4J
(Italy) Lancia Corse HF	Lancia Ypsilon Rally4 HF	(Italy) Francesco Dei Ceci	(Italy) Christian Vizzaccaro	H	3, 5	ERC4J
(Italy) Lancia Corse HF	Lancia Ypsilon Rally4 HF	(Italy) Francesco Dei Ceci	(San Marino) Daiana Darderi	H	4, 6–7	ERC4J
(Italy) Lancia Corse HF	Lancia Ypsilon Rally4 HF	(Italy) Davide Pesavento	(Italy) Alessio Angeli	H	2–7	ERC4J
(Republic of Ireland) Motorsport Ireland Rally Academy	Peugeot 208 Rally4	(Republic of Ireland) Kyle McBride	(Republic of Ireland) Liam Callaghan	H	2–6	ERC4J
(Latvia) Sporta klubs Autostils Rally Team	Renault Clio Rally4	(Spain) Petr Turkin	(Kyrgyzstan) Vasily Mirkotan	P	1	Master ERC
Private Rally4 and Rally5 entries
Entered under driver's name	Lancia Ypsilon Rally4 HF	(Italy) Nicolò Ardizzone	(Italy) Alessandro Scartabelli	M	3	
Entered under driver's name	Lancia Ypsilon Rally4 HF	(Lithuania) Markas Buteikis	(Lithuania) Titas Čapkauskas	H	2–4	ERC4J
Entered under driver's name	Lancia Ypsilon Rally4 HF	(Italy) Moreno Cambiaghi	(Italy) Giulia Paganoni	M	3	
Entered under driver's name	Opel Corsa Rally4	(Latvia) Arvid Carlsson	(Sweden) David Arhusiander	H	2	ERC4J
Entered under driver's name	Lancia Ypsilon Rally4 HF	(Italy) Christian Casadei	(Italy) Nadir Bionaz	M	3	Master ERC
Entered under driver's name	Lancia Ypsilon Rally4 HF	(Italy) Sebastian Dallapiccola	(Italy) Nicolò Lazzarini	H	2–3	ERC4J
Entered under driver's name	Lancia Ypsilon Rally4 HF	(Italy) Sebastian Dallapiccola	(Italy) Lorenzo Mattucci	H	4, 7	ERC4J
Entered under driver's name	Lancia Ypsilon Rally4 HF	(Italy) Sebastian Dallapiccola	(Italy) Samuele Pellegrino	H	5–6	ERC4J
Entered under driver's name	Lancia Ypsilon Rally4 HF	(Italy) Edoardo De Antoni	(Italy) Martina Musiari	M	3	
Entered under driver's name	Lancia Ypsilon Rally4 HF	(Italy) Simone Di Giovanni	(Italy) Andrea Colapietro	M	3	
Entered under driver's name	Ford Fiesta Rally4	(Germany) Colin Dünker	(Germany) Jonas Decker	H	2–6	ERC4J
Entered under driver's name	Lancia Ypsilon Rally4 HF	(Italy) Emanuele Fiore	(Italy) Nicolò Gonella	M	3	Master ERC
Entered under driver's name	Lancia Ypsilon Rally4 HF	(Italy) Federico Francia	(Italy) Marco Nesti	M	3	
Entered under driver's name	Lancia Ypsilon Rally4 HF	(Italy) Roberto Gobbin	(Italy) Ismaele Barra	M	3	Master ERC
Entered under driver's name	Lancia Ypsilon Rally4 HF	(Finland) Aatu Hakalehto	(Finland) Niklas Heino	H	1, 3–4	ERC4J
Entered under driver's name	Lancia Ypsilon Rally4 HF	(Finland) Aatu Hakalehto	(Finland) Ari Koponen	H	2	ERC4J
Entered under driver's name	Peugeot 208 Rally4	(Poland) Łukasz Kaplita	(Poland) Krzysztof Pietruszka	M	4	
Entered under driver's name	Lancia Ypsilon Rally4 HF	(Italy) Gianmarco Lazzarato	(Italy) Giulia De Nicola	M	3	
Entered under driver's name	Opel Corsa Rally4	(Italy) Valentino Ledda	(Italy) Marco Demontis	P	1	
Entered under driver's name	Opel Corsa Rally4	(Italy) Valentino Ledda	(Italy) Lorenzo Fratta	P	2, 5	
Entered under driver's name	Opel Corsa Rally4	(Italy) Valentino Ledda	(Italy) Claudio Mele	P	3, 7	
Entered under driver's name	Opel Corsa Rally4	(Italy) Valentino Ledda	(Italy) Stefano Pudda	P	6	
Entered under driver's name	Lancia Ypsilon Rally4 HF	(Italy) Christopher Lucchesi	(Italy) Enrico Bracchi	M	3	
Entered under driver's name	Renault Clio Rally5	(Romania) Ciprian Lupu	(Romania) Andrei Aitculesei	P	3, 5	
Entered under driver's name	Lancia Ypsilon Rally4 HF	(Austria) Marcel Neulinger	(Austria) Jürgen Heigl	H	2–4	ERC4J
Entered under driver's name	Peugeot 208 Rally4	(Italy) Francesco Paccagnella	(Italy) Paolo Zanini	H	3–5	ERC4J
Entered under driver's name	Peugeot 208 Rally4	(France) Anthony Rott	(France) Adrien Rott	H	4	ERC4J
Entered under driver's name	Lancia Ypsilon Rally4 HF	(Italy) Tommaso Sandrin	(Italy) Andrea Dal Maso	P	1	
Entered under driver's name	Lancia Ypsilon Rally4 HF	(Italy) Tommaso Sandrin	(Italy) Andrea Dal Maso	H	2–5	ERC4J
Entered under driver's name	Peugeot 208 Rally4	(Slovakia) Filip Šipoš	(Czech Republic) Zdeněk Omelka	H	3–5	ERC4J
Entered under driver's name	Lancia Ypsilon Rally4 HF	(Norway) Martin Stenberg	(Norway) Øyvind Rødsjø Beckstrøm	H	2	ERC4J
Entered under driver's name	Lancia Ypsilon Rally4 HF	(Italy) Augusto Sterpetti	(Italy) Mario Colella	P	3	
Entered under driver's name	Peugeot 208 Rally4	(Romania) Reis Suliman	(Republic of Ireland) Lorcan Moore	H	2–5, 7	ERC4J
Entered under driver's name	Lancia Ypsilon Rally4 HF	(Italy) Asia Vidori	(Italy) Alice Tasselli	M	3	
Entered under driver's name	Renault Clio Rally5	(Italy) Ludwig Zigliani	(Italy) Sara Montavoci	P	1–3, 5	
Entered under driver's name	Peugeot 208 Rally4	(Italy) Ludwig Zigliani	(Italy) Sara Montavoci	P	4	

== Results ==
=== Season summary ===
Round	Event	Winning driver	Winning co-driver	Winning entrant	Winning time	Report	Ref.
1	(Spain) Andalusia Rally Sierra Morena	(Spain) José Antonio Suárez	(Spain) Alberto Iglesias	(Spain) Recalvi Team	1:57:02.5	Report	
2	(Sweden) Royal Rally of Scandinavia	(Finland) Mikko Heikkilä	(Finland) Kristian Temonen	(Finland) Mikko Heikkilä	1:31:07.8	Report	
3	(Italy) Rally di Roma Capitale	(Italy) Roberto Daprà	(Italy) Luca Guglielmetti	(Italy) Roberto Daprà	1:58:02.5	Report	
4	Rally Poland	(Finland) Teemu Suninen	(Finland) Antti Haapala	(Portugal) The Racing Factory - Motorsport Solutions	1:38:52.8	Report	
5	(Czech Republic) Barum Czech Rally Zlín	(Czech Republic) Adam Březík	(Czech Republic) Zdeněk Bělák Jr.	(Czech Republic) Samohýl Škoda Team	1:57:13.5	Report	
6	(United Kingdom) Rali Ceredigion	(Andorra) Kris Meeke	(Republic of Ireland) Neil O'Sullivan Jr.	(Andorra) Kris Meeke	1:29:45.3	Report	
7	Rally Six Cities North of Portugal	(Latvia) Mārtiņš Sesks	(Latvia) Renārs Francis	(India) Team MRF Tyres	2:05:42.1	Report	

=== Scoring system ===
Points for final position are awarded as in the following table in the ERC. In ERC, ERC3, ERC4, Master ERC, the Teams’ and the Tyre Suppliers' categories, the best six scores from the seven rounds count towards the final number of points. In the Junior ERC category, the best five rounds out of six count.

Position	1st	2nd	3rd	4th	5th	6th	7th	8th	9th	10th	11th	12th	13th	14th	15th
Points	30	24	21	19	17	15	13	11	9	7	5	4	3	2	1

There are also five bonus points awarded to the winners of the Power Stage, four points for second place, three for third, two for fourth and one for fifth. Power Stage points are awarded only in the main ERC drivers' and co-drivers' championships.

Position	1st	2nd	3rd	4th	5th
Points	5	4	3	2	1

Teams may register a maximum of three cars under a team name to score points in the teams' championship, of which the best two will score points. Cars driven by ERC4 priority drivers score points in their own group.

=== Drivers' championships ===
==== ERC ====
Pos.	Driver	ESP (Spain)	SWE (Sweden)	ITA (Italy)	POL (Poland)	CZE (Czech Republic)	GBR (United Kingdom)	POR (Portugal)	Points	Best 6
1	(Finland) Teemu Suninen	4^{2}	Ret	2^{5}	1^{4}	2^{2}	2^{1}		137	137
2	(Poland) Mikołaj Marczyk	47^{4}	7	10	3^{2}	4^{3}	3^{4}	8	103	101
3	(Italy) Andrea Mabellini	6^{1}	Ret	8^{4}	4^{1}	3^{1}	6	Ret	98	98
4	(Romania) Simone Tempestini	15	5	13	15^{5}	6^{4}	8^{5}	5^{3}	72	71
5	(Latvia) Mārtiņš Sesks		2^{2}					1^{1}	63	63
6	(Poland) Jakub Matulka	8	Ret	Ret	2	5^{5}	Ret	11	58	53
7	(Italy) Giandomenico Basso	3^{5}		4^{2}					45	45
8	(France) Pablo Sarrazin			7				2	37	37
9	(United Kingdom) Kris Meeke						1^{2}	Ret	34	34
10	(Spain) José Antonio Suárez	1							30	30
11	(Finland) Mikko Heikkilä		1						30	30
12	(Italy) Roberto Daprà			1					30	30
13	(Czech Republic) Adam Březík					1			30	30
13	(Bolivia) Marco Bulacia	10		11	6^{3}	WD			30	30
14	(Spain) Iván Ares	2^{3}							27	27
15	(Sweden) Isak Reiersen	16	3	17	11	WD			26	26
16	(Italy) Boštjan Avbelj			3^{1}					26	26
17	(Republic of Ireland) William Creighton	7	Ret	14	9	Ret			24	24
18	(Sweden) Calle Carlberg	18	4^{3}						22	22
19	(Spain) Jorge Cagiao	5							17	17
20	(France) Yoann Bonato			5					17	17
21	(Poland) Kajetan Kajetanowicz				5				17	17
22	(Norway) Eyvind Brynildsen		6						15	15
23	(Sweden) Mille Johansson			6					15	15
23	(Poland) Adrian Rzeźnik	36			7				13	13
25	(Czech Republic) Filip Mareš					7			13	13
26	(Estonia) Joosep Ralf Nõgene		8^{4}						13	13
27	(Poland) Jarosław Szeja				8				11	11
28	(Austria) Simon Wagner					8			11	11
29	(Finland) Tuukka Kauppinen	11	11	Ret		WD			10	10
30	(Czech Republic) Dominik Stříteský	9		Ret	Ret	WD			9	9
31	(Canada) Brandon Semenuk		9						9	9
32	(France) Yohan Rossel			9					9	9
33	(Czech Republic) Václav Pech					9			9	9
34	(Czech Republic) Erik Cais	14		52	10	Ret			9	9
35	(France) Tristan Charpentier	12	12^{5}	57	16	WD			9	9
36	(Spain) Roberto Blach	19		15	21	10			8	8
37	(Paraguay) Fabrizio Zaldivar	20	10						7	7
38	(Hungary) Gábor Német	22	Ret	Ret	19	11			5	5
39	(Finland) Ville Vatanen	32	14	22	18	13			5	5
40	(Finland) Benjamin Korhola	Ret	38^{1}						5	5
41	(Italy) Simone Campedelli			12					4	4
42	(Czech Republic) Jaromír Tarabus					12			4	4
43	(United Kingdom) Philip Allen	43	Ret		12				4	4
44	(France) Pierre Ragues	17	13	58					3	3
45	(Republic of Ireland) Callum Devine	13							3	3
46	(Poland) Adam Sroka				13				3	3
47	(Italy) Andrea Crugnola			63^{3}					3	3
48	(Romania) Andrei Gîrtofan	WD		25	17	14			2	2
49	(Poland) Jarosław Kołtun				14				2	2
50	(Republic of Ireland) Craig Rahill	Ret	15	21	Ret	16			1	1
51	(Czech Republic) Martin Vlček					15			1	1

Key
Colour	Result
Gold	Winner
Silver	2nd place
Bronze	3rd place
Green	Points finish
Blue	Non-points finish
Blue	Non-classified finish (NC)
Purple	Did not finish (Ret)
Black	Excluded (EX)
Black	Disqualified (DSQ)
White	Did not start (DNS)
White	Cancelled (C)
Blank	Withdrew entry from the event (WD)

Notes:
^{1 2 3 4 5} – Power Stage position

==== ERC3 ====
Pos.	Driver	ESP (Spain)	SWE (Sweden)	ITA (Italy)	POL (Poland)	CZE (Czech Republic)	GBR (United Kingdom)	POR (Portugal)	Points	Best 6
1	(Finland) Ville Vatanen	7	1	2	1	1			127	127
2	(France) Lucas Zielinski	1	6	3	Ret	3			87	87
3	(Republic of Ireland) Casey Jay Coleman	2	4	4	2	Ret			86	86
4	(Republic of Ireland) Kalum Graffin	4	8	7	3	6			79	79
5	(Republic of Ireland) Craig Rahill	Ret	2	1	Ret	2			78	78
6	(Czech Republic) Petr Kačírek	6	3	5	4	Ret			72	72
7	(Poland) Igor Widłak	8	WD	9	5	5			54	54
8	(United Kingdom) Charlie Tuthill		7	8		9			33	33
9	(Republic of Ireland) Cian Caldwell	5	Ret	6	Ret	Ret			32	32
10	(Austria) Maximilian Lichtenegger	3	9	Ret					30	30
11	(Poland) Marcin Górny				6	7			28	28
12	(Romania) Alexandra Teslovan	13		11	10	8			26	26
13	(Poland) Błażej Gazda	12		10	8				22	22
14	(Poland) Sebastian Butyński	11		Ret	9	10			21	21
15	(Austria) Roland Stengg					4			19	19
16	(Turkey) Kerem Kazaz		5						17	17
16	(Poland) Tomasz Bargiel				7				13	13
18	(Bulgaria) Aleksandar Tomov	9							9	9
19	(Croatia) Jan Pokos	10	Ret						7	7
20	(Spain) Joan Socías	14							2	2

==== ERC4 ====
Pos.	Driver	ESP (Spain)	SWE (Sweden)	ITA (Italy)	POL (Poland)	CZE (Czech Republic)	GBR (United Kingdom)	POR (Portugal)	Points	Best 6
1	(Belgium) Tom Heindrichs		2	7	1	1			97	97
2	(Germany) Timo Schulz		1	3	10	2			82	82
3	(Italy) Davide Pesavento		3	1	3	Ret			72	72
4	(Italy) Tommaso Sandrin	2	6	6	6	Ret			69	69
5	(Finland) Aatu Hakalehto	1	Ret	Ret	2				54	54
6	(Germany) Colin Dünker		5	Ret	4	8			47	47
7	(Norway) Karl Peder Nordstrand		Ret	5	17	3			38	38
8	(Italy) Francesco Dei Ceci	Ret	12	Ret	5	5			38	38
9	(Republic of Ireland) Kyle McBride		Ret	Ret	7	4			32	32
10	(Italy) Valentino Ledda	5	9	Ret					26	26
11	(France) Alexandre Villiod			2					24	24
12	(Italy) Ludwig Zigliani	4	13	Ret	16	Ret			22	22
13	(Austria) Marcel Neulinger		7	9	Ret				22	22
14	(Slovakia) Filip Šipoš			Ret	9	7			22	22
15	(Spain) Petr Turkin	3							21	21
16	(Latvia) Arvid Carlsson		4						19	19
17	(Italy) Simone di Giovanni			4					19	19
18	(Italy) Sebastian Dallapiccola		10	Ret	8	Ret			18	18
19	(Austria) Luca Pröglhöf					6			15	15
20	(Lithuania) Markas Buteikis		8	13					14	14
21	(Italy) Moreno Cambiaghi			8					11	11
22	(Germany) Claire Schönborn		11	15	12				10	10
23	(Romania) Reis Suliman		14	12	13	Ret			9	9
24	(Italy) Nicolò Ardizzone			10					7	7
25	(Italy) Francesco Paccagnella			11	14	Ret			7	7
26	(France) Anthony Rott				11				5	5
27	(Italy) Christian Casadei			14					2	2
28	(Poland) Łukasz Kaplita				15				1	1

==== Junior ERC ====
Pos.	Driver	SWE (Sweden)	ITA (Italy)	POL (Poland)	CZE (Czech Republic)	GBR (United Kingdom)	POR (Portugal)	Points	Best 5
1	(Belgium) Tom Heindrichs	2	5	1	1			101	101
2	(Germany) Timo Schulz	1	2	10	2			85	85
3	(Italy) Davide Pesavento	3	1	3	Ret			72	72
4	(Italy) Tommaso Sandrin	6	4	6	Ret			49	49
5	(Germany) Colin Dünker	5	Ret	4	8			47	47
6	(Norway) Karl Peder Nordstrand	Ret	3	15	3			43	43
7	(Italy) Francesco Dei Ceci	11	Ret	5	5			39	39
8	(Republic of Ireland) Kyle McBride	Ret	Ret	7	4			32	32
9	(Austria) Marcel Neulinger	7	6	Ret				28	28
10	(Finland) Aatu Hakalehto	Ret	Ret	2				24	24
11	(Slovakia) Filip Šipoš		Ret	9	7			22	22
12	(Italy) Sebastian Dallapiccola	9	Ret	8	Ret			20	20
13	(Lithuania) Markas Buteikis	8	9					20	20
14	(Latvia) Arvid Carlsson	4						19	19
15	(Romania) Reis Suliman	12	8	13	Ret			18	18
16	(Germany) Claire Schönborn	10	10	12				18	18
17	(Austria) Luca Pröglhöf				6			15	15
18	(Italy) Francesco Paccagnella		7	14	Ret			15	15
19	(France) Anthony Rott			11				5	5

==== Master ERC ====
Pos.	Driver	ESP (Spain)	SWE (Sweden)	ITA (Italy)	POL (Poland)	CZE (Czech Republic)	GBR (United Kingdom)	POR (Portugal)	Points	Best 6
1	(Italy) Giandomenico Basso	1		1					60	60
2	(Czech Republic) Martin Vlček					1			30	30
3	(Hungary) András Hadik	2							24	24
4	(Italy) Antonio Rusce			2					24	24
5	(Czech Republic) Tomáš Kurka					2			24	24
6	(Spain) Petr Turkin	3							21	21
7	(Mexico) Juan Carlos Peralta			3					21	21
8	(Italy) Vittorio Ceccato			4					19	19
9	(Italy) Christian Casadei			5					17	17
10	(Italy) Emanuele Fiore			6					15	15
11	(Italy) Roberto Gobbin			7					13	13

==== Fiesta Rally3 Trophy ====
Pos.	Driver	ESP (Spain)	SWE (Sweden)	ITA (Italy)	POL (Poland)	CZE (Czech Republic)	Points
1	(Finland) Ville Vatanen	5	1	2	1	1	131
2	(Republic of Ireland) Casey Jay Coleman	1	4	3	2	Ret	94
3	(Republic of Ireland) Kalum Graffin	2	6	6	3	4	94
4	(Republic of Ireland) Craig Rahill	Ret	2	1	Ret	2	78
5	(Czech Republic) Petr Kačírek	4	3	4	4	Ret	78
6	(Poland) Igor Widłak	6	WD	8	5	3	64
7	(Romania) Alexandra Teslovan	8		9	7	6	48
8	(United Kingdom) Charlie Tuthill		5	7		7	43
9	(Republic of Ireland) Cian Caldwell	3	Ret	5	Ret	Ret	38
10	(Poland) Marcin Górny				6	5	32
11	(Croatia) Jan Pokos	7	Ret				13
12	(Spain) Joan Socías	9					9

=== Co-drivers' championships ===
==== ERC ====
Pos.	Driver	ESP (Spain)	SWE (Sweden)	ITA (Italy)	POL (Poland)	CZE (Czech Republic)	GBR (United Kingdom)	POR (Portugal)	Points	Best 6
1	(Spain) Alberto Iglesias	1							30	30
2	(Spain) Borja Rozada	2^{3}							27	27
3	(Finland) Antti Haapala	4^{2}							23	23
4	(Italy) Lorenzo Granai	3^{5}							22	22
5	(Italy) Virginia Lenzi	6^{1}							20	20
6	(Spain) Javier Martínez	5							17	17
7	(Republic of Ireland) Liam Regan	7							13	13
8	(Poland) Damian Syty	8							11	11
9	(Czech Republic) Ondřej Krajča	9							9	9
10	(Spain) Axel Coronado	10							7	7
11	(Finland) Sebastian Virtanen	11							5	5
12	(France) Loris Pascaud	12							4	4
13	(Republic of Ireland) Noel O'Sullivan	13							3	3
14	(Slovakia) Igor Bacigál	14							2	2
15	(Poland) Szymon Gospodarczyk	47^{4}							2	2
16	(Romania) Sergiu Itu	15							1	1

==== ERC3 ====
Pos.	Driver	ESP (Spain)	SWE (Sweden)	ITA (Italy)	POL (Poland)	CZE (Czech Republic)	GBR (United Kingdom)	POR (Portugal)	Points	Best 6
1	(France) Ewen Leenhardt	1							30	30
2	(Republic of Ireland) Killian McArdle	2							24	24
3	(Austria) Bernhard Ettel	3							21	21
4	(United Kingdom) Rhodri Evans	4							19	19
5	(Republic of Ireland) Paul McPhillips	5							17	17
6	(Czech Republic) Ladislav Kučera	6							15	15
7	(Finland) Joonas Ojala	7							13	13
8	(Poland) Daniel Dymurski	8							11	11
9	(Bulgaria) Nedyalko Sivov	9							9	9
10	(Germany) Jara Hain	10							7	7
11	(Poland) Łukasz Jastrzębski	11							5	5
12	(Poland) Michał Jurgała	12							4	4
13	(Romania) Mihai Supuran	13							3	3
14	(Spain) Diego Fuentes	14							2	2

==== ERC4 ====
Pos.	Driver	ESP (Spain)	SWE (Sweden)	ITA (Italy)	POL (Poland)	CZE (Czech Republic)	GBR (United Kingdom)	POR (Portugal)	Points	Best 6
1	(Finland) Niklas Heino	1							30	30
2	(Italy) Andrea Dal Maso	2							24	24
3	(Kyrgyzstan) Vasily Mirkotan	3							21	21
4	(Italy) Sara Montavoci	4							19	19
5	(Italy) Marco Demontis	5							17	17

=== Teams' championship ===
Pos.	Team	ESP (Spain)	SWE (Sweden)	ITA (Italy)	POL (Poland)	CZE (Czech Republic)	GBR (United Kingdom)	POR (Portugal)	Points	Best 6
1	(India) Team MRF Tyres	10	1	4	4				119	119
1	(India) Team MRF Tyres	11	4	9	8				119	119
1	(India) Team MRF Tyres	WD	5		10				119	119
2	(Portugal) The Racing Factory - Motorsport Solutions	3	Ret	1	1				81	81
3	(Italy) Lancia Corse HF	5	16	2	2				78	78
3	(Italy) Lancia Corse HF	Ret	Ret	11	13				78	78
4	(Republic of Ireland) Motorsport Ireland Rally Academy	6	7	5	3				78	78
4	(Republic of Ireland) Motorsport Ireland Rally Academy	17	NC	8	17				78	78
4	(Republic of Ireland) Motorsport Ireland Rally Academy	Ret	Ret	NC	Ret				78	78
5	(Sweden) JC Raceteknik	12	2	6	5				64	64
5	(Sweden) JC Raceteknik	13	15	Ret					64	64
6	(Spain) Recalvi Team	1							49	49
6	(Spain) Recalvi Team	4							49	49
7	(Italy) T-Racing			3					34	34
7	(Italy) T-Racing			7					34	34
8	(Czech Republic) Orsák Rallysport	9	6		9				33	33
9	(Finland) Rautio Motorsport	8							11	11
10	(Spain) Toyota España	2							24	24
11	(Czech Republic) Duck Racing Autoklub v AČR		8	10	12				23	23
12	GK Door Team Sweden		3						21	21
13	(Germany) ADAC Opel Rallye Junior Team		12	12	13				19	19
13	(Germany) ADAC Opel Rallye Junior Team		13	14	15				19	19
13	(Germany) ADAC Opel Rallye Junior Team		14		16				19	19
14	(Czech Republic) Kowax DST Racing				6				15	15
15	(Czech Republic) Auto Podbabská Škoda Team	7							13	13
16	(Poland) KIQ Rally Team				7				13	13
17	(Slovenia) IK Sport Racing		10	13					11	11
17	(Slovenia) IK Sport Racing		Ret	15					11	11
18	(Turkey) Team Petrol Ofisi		9						9	9
19	(Hungary) H Rally Rent	15		Ret	11				8	8
20	(Poland) Grupa PGS RT				14				2	2
21	(Hungary) Solution Proviser Now Kft.	14							2	2

=== Tyre suppliers' championship ===
Pos.	Tyre supplier	ESP (Spain)	SWE (Sweden)	ITA (Italy)	POL (Poland)	CZE (Czech Republic)	GBR (United Kingdom)	POR (Portugal)	Points	Best 6
1	(France) Michelin	1							49	49
1	(France) Michelin	4							49	49
2	(Italy) Pirelli	2							45	45
2	(Italy) Pirelli	3							45	45
3	(India) MRF	5							32	32
3	(India) MRF	6							32	32
4	(South Korea) Hankook	7							24	24
4	(South Korea) Hankook	8							24	24
