= Lancia Ypsilon Rally4 HF =

Lancia Rally4 rally car

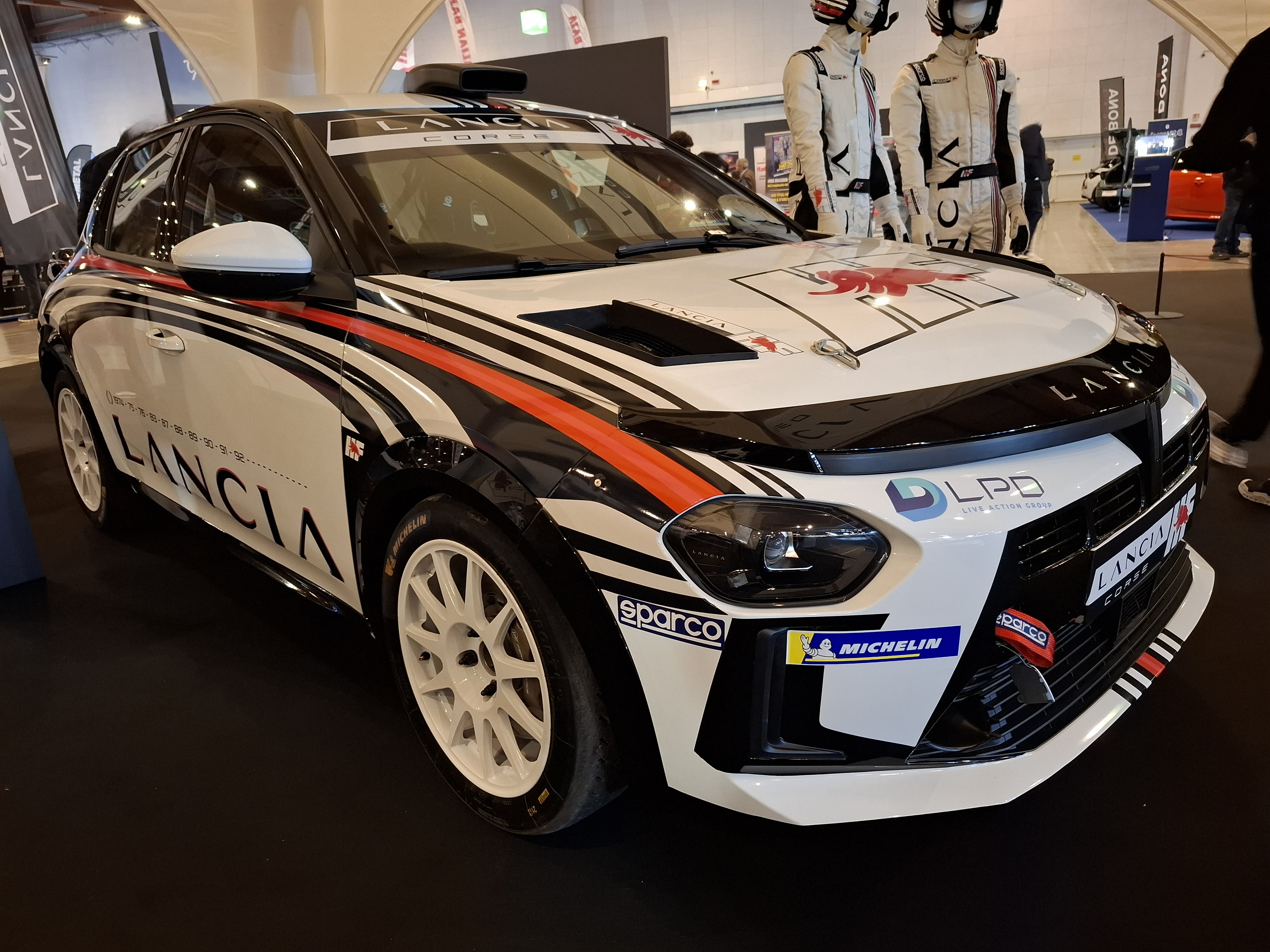
- 2026 Ypsilon Rally4 HF
- Category: Group Rally4
- Constructor: Lancia
- Designers: Eugenio Franzetti (Director, Lancia Corse HF)

Technical specifications
- Engine: EB2LTED 1.2 L (73.2 cu in) 3-cylinder, 12-valve turbocharged front-engine, front-wheel-drive
- Transmission: Sadev 5-speed sequential 2-wheel drive
- Power: 212 PS (156 kW)

Competition history
- Competition: European Rally Championship – ERC4 – ERC Junior
- Debut: 2025 European Rally Championship
- First win: 2025 Barum Czech Rally Zlín
- Last win: 2026 Rally di Roma Capitale
Races	Wins
8	3

The Lancia Ypsilon Rally4 HF is a rally car developed and built by Lancia to FIA's Group Rally4 regulations. It is based upon the Lancia Ypsilon road car and debuted in 2024.

== Development history ==
On 27 May 2024, the Ypsilon Rally4 HF was revealed to the public. During the presentation, Carlos Tavares, the CEO of Stellantis talked about the beginning of Lancia's return to rally competition, particularly in the WRC. However, Tavares ruled out the creation of an official team, leaving the initiative to private teams. A marketing and brand relaunch operation, but with a limited investment, will also take advantage of the components and experience gained for the Peugeot 208 Rally4 and the Opel Corsa Rally4. This version will be powered by 1.2-litre turbocharged three-cylinder engine with 212 hp.

As of July 2024, the first tests of the Ypsilon HF Rally4 took place in the south of France, in Mazamet, Occitania. The car was tested on asphalt by Andrea Crugnola and on dirt by Leo Rossel. On 16 July 2024, the two-time world rally Lancia driving world champion Miki Biasion also carried out a test with the car. On 17 July 2024, Lancia appointed Eugenio Franzetti as Director of Lancia Corse HF. On 23 September 2024, Carlos Tavares, Stellantis CEO, tested the new Lancia Ypsilon Rally4 HF on the Balocco track.

== Competition history ==
=== Rally victories ===
==== ERC4 Championship ====
Year	No.	Event	Surface	Driver	Co-driver
2025	1	(Czech Republic) 2025 Barum Czech Rally Zlín	Tarmac	(Republic of Ireland) Craig Rahill	(Republic of Ireland) Conor Smith
2026	2	(Spain) 2026 Rally Andalucía-Sierra Morena	Tarmac	(Finland) Aatu Hakalehto	(Finland) Niklas Heito
2026	3	(Italy) 2026 Rally di Roma Capitale	Tarmac	(Italy) Davide Pesavento	(Italy) Alessio Angeli

==== Junior European Rally Championship ====
Year	No.	Event	Surface	Driver	Co-driver
2025	1	(Czech Republic) 2025 Barum Czech Rally Zlín	Tarmac	(Republic of Ireland) Craig Rahill	(Republic of Ireland) Conor Smith
2026	2	(Italy) 2026 Rally di Roma Capitale	Tarmac	(Italy) Davide Pesavento	(Italy) Alessio Angeli

==== Campionato Italiano Rally 2025 – Trofeo Lancia Rally ====
In 2025, the Ypsilon Rally 4 HF will mark the return of the Lancia brand to the Italian Rally Championship and will award the Lancia Rally Trophy, which will allow the winner to participate with the official Lancia Corse HF team in the 2026 European Rally Championship with the Ypsilon Rally 4 HF. The Lancia Rally Trophy is made up of 6 races within the Italian championship with three categories: Junior (up to 25 years old), Master (from 25 to 35 years old), Expert (over 35 years old) and the winner is awarded a prize pool of 300,000 euros. Lancia has made official that Sparco will be its technical partner for both driver and car equipment.

Round	Event	Winning driver / co-driver	Ref.
1	(Italy) 2025 Targa Florio (coeff. ×1.5)	(Italy) Gianandrea Pisani / (Italy) Nicola Biagi	
2	(Italy) 2025 Rally Due Valli	(Italy) Davide Pesavento / (Italy) Lorenzo Mattucci	
3	(Italy) 2025 Rally di Roma Capitale (coeff. ×2)	(Italy) Gianandrea Pisani / (Italy) Nicola Biagi	
4	(Italy) 2025 Rally del Lazio	(Italy) Gianandrea Pisani / (Italy) Nicola Biagi	
5	(Italy) 2025 Rallye Sanremo (coeff. ×1.5)	(Italy) Davide Pesavento / (Italy) Alessandro Michelet	

The Lancia Rally Trophy was won by driver Gianandrea Pisani and co-driver Nicola Biagi. Gianandrea Pisani is the winner of the Master category, Gabriel Di Pietro in the Junior category and Mauro Porzia in the Expert category. Furthermore, Lancia also won the 2025 Italian Rally 2WD manufacturers' title, reporting an Italian manufacturers' title that was missing from the brand since 1993.

==== Campionato Italiano Rally 2026 – Trofeo Lancia Rally ====
In 2026, alongside the Ypsilon Rally4 HF, which will participate in the Italian Rally Championship and Trofeo Lancia Rally, there will also be a Ypsilon HF Racing Rally6. Therefore, a Trofeo Lancia Rally 4 and a Trofeo Lancia Rally 6 will be awarded.

Round	Event	Winning driver / co-driver	Ref.
1	(Italy) 2026 Rally Il Ciocco e Valle del Serchio	(Italy) Simone Di Giovanni / (Italy) Andrea Colapietro	
2	(Italy) 2026 Rally Due Valli	(Italy) Edoardo De Antoni / (Italy) Martina Musiari	
3	(Italy) 2026 Rally di Roma Capitale	(Italy) Simone Di Giovanni / (Italy) Andrea Colapietro	
4	(Italy) 2026 Rally Regione Piemonte	(Italy) Nicolò Ardizzone / (Italy) Alessandro Scartabelli	
5	(Italy) 2026 Rallye Sanremo	(Italy) Mattia Vita / (Italy) Alessio Foresto	

The Lancia Rally Trophy was won by driver Nicolò Ardizzone and co-driver Alessandro Scartabelli.

==== Italian Rally victories – Rally4 ====
Rallies won as Group Rally4 that are not part of the 2026 Italian Rally Championship and do not count towards the awarding of the title.

Year	No.	Event	Surface	Driver	Co-driver
2026	1	(Italy) 2026 Rally Città di Foligno	Gravel	(Italy) Davide Pesavento	(Italy) Alessandro Michelet
2026	2	(Italy) 2026 Rally del Bardolino	Tarmac	(Finland) Aatu Hakalehto	(Finland) Niklas Heino
2026	3	(Italy) 2026 Rally Santo Stefano Belbo - Gil Calleri Cup	Tarmac	(Italy) Alberto Siccardi	(Italy) Stefano Sappracone
2026	4	(Italy) 2026 Rally del Friuli Venezia Giulia	Tarmac	(Italy) Edoardo De Antoni	(Italy) Marco Del Torre
2026	5	(Italy) 2026 Rally Coppa Valtellina	Tarmac	(Italy) Nicolò Ardizzone	(Italy) Alessandro Scartabelli
