= Southern Latian dialect =

Dialect of Neapolitan

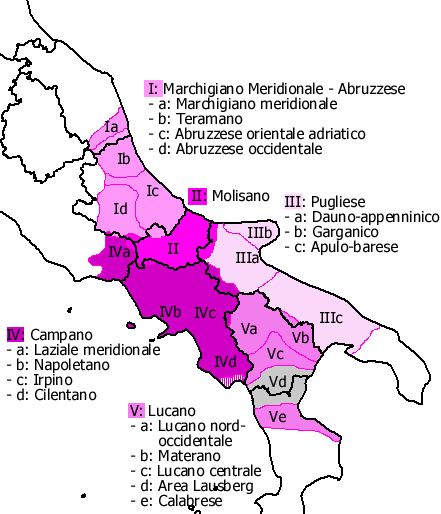
Southern Italian dialects (Southern Latian dialect: IV a)

The Southern Latian dialect (Italian: laziale meridionale) is a Southern Italian Romance vernacular widespread in the southernmost areas of Lazio, in particular south of the city of Frosinone and starting from the cities of Formia and Gaeta along the coast.

== History ==
Although in Roman times the area was part of Latium (Latium adiectum), the region, starting from the Lombard period and therefore from the Duchy of Benevento, entered the orbit of southern political powers, substantially up to the Italian unification. During the Italian fascist regime, the northern territories of the Terra di Lavoro were therefore re-annexed to Lazio. The long southern domination and migrations, for example from nearby Abruzzo to the Land of Saint Benedict, had different effects on the local language.

== Features ==
The dialect is in many respects similar, in particular in the vocabulary, to the dialects of Campania, although it differs from them on the phonetic level (similar to the Abruzzo dialects) and from the influence of the Central-Northern Latian dialects spoken in the nearby central-northern areas of the provinces of Frosinone and Latina.

== See also ==
- Central-Northern Latian dialect
