= European Rally Championship =

Annual rallying championship series in Europe

- Category: Groups Rally; Super 2000; Group N
- Country: Europe
- Inaugural season: 1953; 73 years ago
- Drivers: Varies
- Teams: Varies
- Drivers' champion: (Finland) Teemu Suninen
- Co-Drivers' champion: (Finland) Antti Haapala
- Official website: fiaerc.com

The European Rally Championship (officially FIA European Rally Championship) is an automobile rally competition held annually on the European continent and organized by the Fédération Internationale de l'Automobile (FIA). The championship has been organized since 1953 and has competed in different European countries, alternating between rallies on asphalt and gravel. It was the first supranational rally championship that was organized in the world and therefore the oldest one. In 2012 it had 60 editions and in 2013 it was renewed with the merger with the Intercontinental Rally Challenge.

== History ==
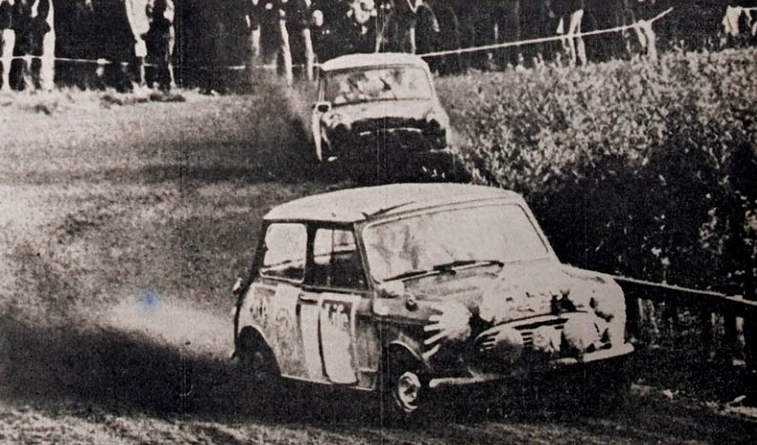
Timo Mäkinen and Rauno Aaltonen at the 1965 1000 Lakes Rally

The European Rally Championship was first contested in 1953 and in the following year was one of the most prestigious rallying series. However, with the introduction of the World Rally Championship for manufacturers in 1973, and in particular with the drivers' World Championship being contested from 1979 on, the importance of the ERC began to decline.

Over many years, a typical ERC season featured around 40 rallies, and from 1974 on, the rallies were assigned different coefficients (1, 2, 3 or 4) that were multiplied with the championship points. Changing the coefficients to 2, 5, 10 and 20 did also not improve the situation. Thus, the ERC was more a series for event organizers than an interesting championship for drivers.

A first improvement was implemented for the 2004 season, where the number of events counting for the European Rally Championship were reduced to those with coefficient 20, while the other rallies became part of regional "European Rally Cups". An ERC season now featured around 10 to 12 events and thus had a clearer structure.

Between 2007 and 2011, the driver had to register for the European championships and thus only registered drivers could score ERC points, keeping the local drivers from taking up all ERC points despite not participating in the championship. The registered drivers were also obligated to contest a minimal number of events.

Between 2013 and 2021, French-based broadcaster Eurosport was the promoter of ERC. From 2022, it was taken over by Munich based WRC Promoter GmbH.

== Recent seasons ==
=== 2010 season ===
The 2010 ERC season featured 11 rallies. Luca Rossetti was the winner of 4 events and won the championship.

=== 2011 season ===
The 2011 ERC season started on 14 April 2011 and featured 11 rallies. It ended on 29 October with the Rallye International du Valais. Italian driver Luca Rossetti claimed his third European championship title after winning 5 of the events. In total, 28 registered drivers from 7 different countries competed in the championship.

=== 2012 season ===
The 2012 season started in January with a new event, the "Jänner Rallye" in Austria. As an important change, drivers no longer had to register for the championship. Finnish driver Juho Hänninen won the championship.

=== 2013 season ===
The 2013 season is the first after the merger between IRC and the old ERC, and also the first after Eurosport became the championship's promoter. The season started with the Jänner Rallye in Austria on 3 January 2013, and ended with the Rallye du Valais on 9 November. Czech driver Jan Kopecký won the championship.

=== 2014 season ===
The 2014 season started with the Jänner Rallye in Austria on 3 January 2014, and ended with the Tour de Corse on 8 November. Finnish driver Esapekka Lappi won the championship and the new Asphalt Masters trophy, while Polish drivers Robert Kubica and Kajetan Kajetanowicz won the Ice Masters and Gravel Masters, respectively. French driver Stéphane Lefebvre won the ERC Junior championship.

=== 2015 season ===
The season started with the Jänner Rallye in Austria on 4 January 2015, and ended with the Rallye International du Valais on 7 November. For this year the drivers had to register for the championship, and the categories have been renamed into ERC 1 (for S2000, R5 and RRC (last year) cars), ERC 2 (category for R4 production cars (previously titled N4)) and ERC 3 (for R1, R2 and R3 cars). Polish driver Kajetan Kajetanowicz won the championship.

=== 2025 season ===
Lancia returns to rally racing after a 32-year absence, with the Lancia Ypsilon Rally4 HF competing in the ERC4 and Junior support categories. It also scored a victory in the 2025 Barum Czech Rally Zlín with driver Craig Rahill and co-driver Conor Smith of the Motorsport Ireland Rally Academy team. The championship was won by driver Mikołaj Marczyk and co-driver Szymon Gospodarczyk with Škoda Fabia RS Rally2.

=== 2026 season ===
The season saw the return of Lancia with the official Lancia Corse HF team competing in the championship with the Lancia Ypsilon Rally2 HF Integrale, after 33 years of absence of the brand. The championship was won by driver Teemu Suninen and co-driver Antti Haapala with Škoda Fabia RS Rally2.

== Champions ==
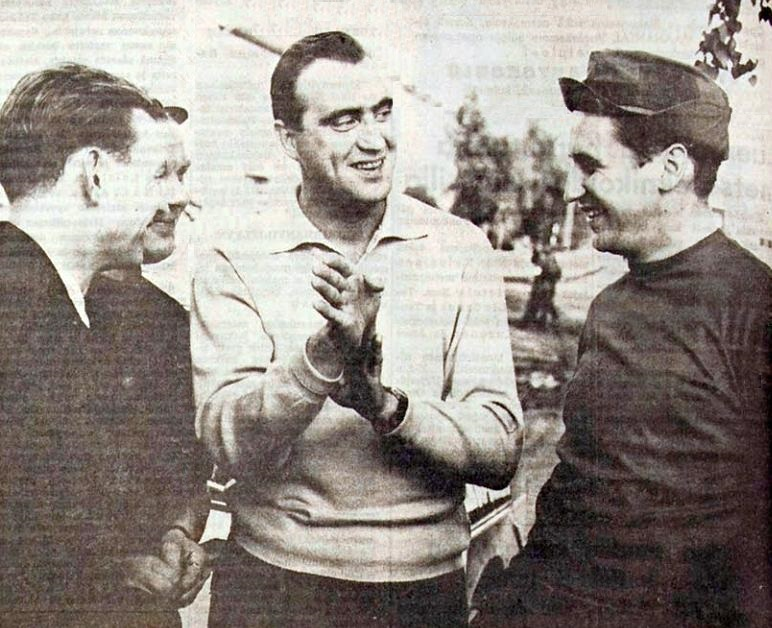
1965 champion Rauno Aaltonen, 1968 champion Pauli Toivonen and Timo Mäkinen

=== European Rally Championship for Drivers ===
| Season | Driver | Co-driver | Car Model(s) Used |
|---|---|---|---|
| 1953 | (Germany) Helmut Polensky | (Germany) Walter Schlüter | Porsche 356 Coupé; Fiat 1100 |
| 1954 | (Germany) Walter Schlüter | | DKW 3=6 F91 Sonderklasse |
| 1955 | (Germany) Werner Engel | | Mercedes-Benz 300 SL |
| 1956 | (Germany) Walter Schock | | Mercedes-Benz 220; Mercedes-Benz 300 SL |
| 1957 | (Germany) Ruprecht Hopfen | | Borgward Isabella; Saab 93 |
| 1958 | (Sweden) Gunnar Andersson | | Volvo PV444; Volvo PV544 |
| 1959 | (France) Paul Coltelloni | | Alfa Romeo Giulietta TI; Citroën ID 19 |
| 1960 | (Germany) Walter Schock | | Mercedes-Benz 220 SE |
| 1961 | (Germany) Hans-Joachim Walter | | Porsche 356 Carrera Coupé |
| 1962 | (Germany) Eugen Böhringer | | Mercedes-Benz 220 SE |
| 1963 | (Sweden) Gunnar Andersson | | Volvo 122 S Volvo PV544 |
| 1964 | (Sweden) Tom Trana | | Volvo PV544 S |
| 1965 | (Finland) Rauno Aaltonen | | BMC Mini Cooper S |
| 1966 | (Sweden) Lillebror Nasenius | | Opel Rekord |
| 1966 | (Poland) Sobiesław Zasada | | BMC Mini Cooper S Steyr-Puch 650 TR |
| 1966 | (Germany) Günter Klass | | Porsche 911 |
| 1967 | (Poland) Sobiesław Zasada | | Porsche 911 S Porsche 912 |
| 1967 | (Sweden) Bengt Söderström | | Lotus Cortina |
| 1967 | (United Kingdom) Vic Elford | | Porsche 911 S |
| 1968 | (Finland) Pauli Toivonen | | Porsche 911 T |
| 1969 | (Sweden) Harry Källström | | Lancia Fulvia Coupé 1.3 HF; Lancia Fulvia Coupé 1.6 HF |
| 1970 | (France) Jean-Claude Andruet | | Alpine A110 1600 |
| 1971 | (Poland) Sobiesław Zasada | | BMW 2002 TI |
| 1972 | (Italy) Raffaele Pinto | (Italy) Gino Macaluso | Fiat 124 Sport Spider |
| 1973 | (Italy) Sandro Munari | (Italy) Mario Mannucci | Lancia Fulvia Coupé 1.6 HF |
| 1974 | (Germany) Walter Röhrl | (Germany) Jochen Berger | Opel Ascona A |
| 1975 | (Italy) Maurizio Verini | | Fiat Abarth 124 Rally |
| 1976 | (France) Bernard Darniche | | Lancia Stratos HF |
| 1977 | (France) Bernard Darniche | | Lancia Stratos HF |
| 1978 | (Italy) Tony Carello | | Lancia Stratos HF |
| 1979 | (Germany) Jochi Kleint | | Opel Ascona B Opel Kadett GT/E |
| 1980 | (Spain) Antonio Zanini | | Porsche 911 SC; Ford Escort RS1800 |
| 1981 | (Italy) Adartico Vudafieri | | Fiat 131 Abarth |
| 1982 | (Italy) Antonio Fassina | | Opel Ascona 400 |
| 1983 | (Italy) Miki Biasion | (Italy) Tiziano Siviero | Lancia Rally 037 |
| 1984 | (Italy) Carlo Capone | (United States) Sergio Cresto | Lancia Rally 037 |
| 1985 | (Italy) Dario Cerrato | (Italy) Giuseppe Cerri | Lancia Rally 037 |
| 1986 | (Italy) Fabrizio Tabaton | (Italy) Luciano Tedeschini | Lancia Delta S4 |
| 1987 | (Italy) Dario Cerrato | (Italy) Giuseppe Cerri | Lancia Delta HF 4WD |
| 1988 | (Italy) Fabrizio Tabaton | (Italy) Luciano Tedeschini | Lancia Delta HF 4WD; Lancia Delta Integrale |
| 1989 | (France) Yves Loubet | (France) Jean-Marc Andrié | Lancia Delta Integrale |
| 1990 | (Belgium) Robert Droogmans | (Belgium) Joosten Ronny | Lancia Delta Integrale 16V |
| 1991 | (Italy) Piero Liatti | (Italy) Luciano Tedeschini | Lancia Delta Integrale 16V |
| 1992 | (Germany) Erwin Weber | (Germany) Manfred Hiemer | Mitsubishi Galant VR-4 |
| 1993 | (France) Pierre-César Baroni | (France) Denis Giraudet | Lancia Delta HF Integrale; Ford Escort RS Cosworth |
| 1994 | (Belgium) Patrick Snijers | | Ford Escort RS Cosworth |
| 1995 | (Italy) Enrico Bertone | | Toyota Celica Turbo 4WD |
| 1996 | (Germany) Armin Schwarz | (France) Denis Giraudet | Toyota Celica GT-Four ST205 |
| 1997 | (Poland) Krzysztof Hołowczyc | (Poland) Maciej Wisławski | Subaru Impreza 555 |
| 1998 | (Italy) Andrea Navarra | | Subaru Impreza 555 |
| 1999 | (Italy) Enrico Bertone | | Renault Mégane Maxi |
| 2000 | (Denmark) Henrik Lundgaard | (Denmark) Jens Christian Anker | Toyota Corolla WRC |
| 2001 | (Germany) Armin Kremer | | Toyota Corolla WRC |
| 2002 | (Italy) Renato Travaglia | | Peugeot 206 WRC |
| 2003 | (Belgium) Bruno Thiry | (Belgium) Jean-Marc Fortin | Peugeot 206 WRC |
| 2004 | (France) Simon Jean-Joseph | | Renault Clio S1600 |
| 2005 | (Italy) Renato Travaglia | (Italy) Flavio Zanella | Mitsubishi Lancer Evolution VII; Renault Clio S1600 |
| 2006 | (Italy) Giandomenico Basso | (Italy) Mitia Dotta | Fiat Punto Abarth S2000 |
| 2007 | (France) Simon Jean-Joseph | (France) Jack Boyere | Citroën C2 S1600; Citroën C2 R2 |
| 2008 | (Italy) Luca Rossetti | (Italy) Matteo Chiarcossi | Peugeot 207 S2000 |
| 2009 | (Italy) Giandomenico Basso | (Italy) Mitia Dotta | Abarth Grande Punto S2000 |
| 2010 | (Italy) Luca Rossetti | (Italy) Matteo Chiarcossi | Abarth Grande Punto S2000 |
| 2011 | (Italy) Luca Rossetti | (Italy) Matteo Chiarcossi | Abarth Grande Punto S2000 |
| 2012 | (Finland) Juho Hänninen | (Finland) Mikko Markkula | Škoda Fabia S2000 |
| 2013 | (Czech Republic) Jan Kopecký | (Czech Republic) Pavel Dresler | Škoda Fabia S2000 |
| 2014 | (Finland) Esapekka Lappi | (Finland) Janne Ferm | Škoda Fabia S2000 |
| 2015 | (Poland) Kajetan Kajetanowicz | (Poland) Jarosław Baran | Ford Fiesta R5 |
| 2016 | (Poland) Kajetan Kajetanowicz | (Poland) Jarosław Baran | Ford Fiesta R5 |
| 2017 | (Poland) Kajetan Kajetanowicz | (Poland) Jarosław Baran | Ford Fiesta R5 |
| 2018 | (Russia) Alexey Lukyanuk | (Russia) Alexey Arnautov | Ford Fiesta R5 |
| 2019 | (United Kingdom) Chris Ingram | (United Kingdom) Ross Whittock | Škoda Fabia R5; Škoda Fabia R5 evo |
| 2020 | (Russia) Alexey Lukyanuk | (Russia) Dmitriy Eremeev | Citroën C3 R5 |
| 2021 | (Norway) Andreas Mikkelsen | (Spain) Sara Fernández (Note: Fernández was not co-driver to the winning driver, Mikkelsen) | Škoda Fabia Rally2 evo |
| 2022 | (Spain) Efrén Llarena | (Spain) Sara Fernández | Škoda Fabia Rally2 evo |
| 2023 | (New Zealand) Hayden Paddon | (New Zealand) John Kennard | Hyundai i20 N Rally2 |
| 2024 | (New Zealand) Hayden Paddon | (New Zealand) John Kennard | Hyundai i20 N Rally2 |
| 2025 | (Poland) Mikołaj Marczyk | (Poland) Szymon Gospodarczyk | Škoda Fabia RS Rally2 |
| 2026 | (Finland) Teemu Suninen | (Finland) Antti Haapala | Škoda Fabia RS Rally2 |

== Multiple winner ==
| | Name | Titles | Winning Years |
|---|---|---|---|
| (Poland) | Sobiesław Zasada | 3 | 1966, 1967, 1971 |
| (Italy) | Luca Rossetti | 3 | 2008, 2010, 2011 |
| (Poland) | Kajetan Kajetanowicz | 3 | 2015, 2016, 2017 |
| (Germany) | Walter Schock | 2 | 1956, 1960 |
| (Sweden) | Gunnar Andersson | 2 | 1958, 1963 |
| (France) | Bernard Darniche | 2 | 1976, 1977 |
| (Italy) | Dario Cerrato | 2 | 1985, 1987 |
| (Italy) | Fabrizio Tabaton | 2 | 1986, 1988 |
| (Italy) | Enrico Bertone | 2 | 1995, 1999 |
| (Italy) | Renato Travaglia | 2 | 2002, 2005 |
| (France) | Simon Jean-Joseph | 2 | 2004, 2007 |
| (Italy) | Giandomenico Basso | 2 | 2006, 2009 |
| (Russia) | Alexey Lukyanuk | 2 | 2018, 2020 |
| (New Zealand) | Hayden Paddon | 2 | 2023, 2024 |

== Multiple wins by car manufacturer ==
| Name | Titles | Winning Years |
|---|---|---|
| Lancia | 15 | 1969, 1973, 1976, 1977, 1978, 1983, 1984, 1985, 1986, 1987, 1988, 1989, 1990, 1991, 1993 |
| Fiat | 8 | 1953, 1972, 1975, 1981, 2006, 2009, 2010, 2011 |
| Ford | 8 | 1967 (G2), 1980, 1993, 1994, 2015, 2016, 2017, 2018 |
| Škoda | 8 | 2012, 2013, 2014, 2019, 2021, 2022, 2025, 2026 |
| Porsche | 7 | 1953, 1961, 1966 (G3),1967 (G1 and G3), 1968, 1980 |
| Mercedes-Benz | 4 | 1955, 1956, 1960, 1962 |
| Opel | 4 | 1966 (G1), 1974, 1979, 1982 |
| Toyota | 4 | 1995, 1996, 2000, 2001 |

== Support categories ==
=== Support championships ===
European Rally Championship has three support categories, ERC3, ERC4 and ERC Junior. These championships are contested on the same events and stages as the ERC calendar and have tighter restrictions on eligible car criteria.

| Season | 2WD / ERC-3 | | ERC-4 | | ERC Junior U28 / ERC1 Junior / ERC Junior | |
| Season | Driver | Car | Driver | Car | Driver | Car |
|---|---|---|---|---|---|---|
| 2013 | (Hungary) Zoltán Bessenyey | Honda Civic Type-R R3 | Not contested | | Not contested | |
| 2014 | (Hungary) Zoltán Bessenyey | Honda Civic Type-R R3 | Not contested | | Not contested | |
| 2015 | (Sweden) Emil Bergkvist | Opel Adam R2 | Not contested | | Not contested | |
| 2016 | (United Kingdom) Chris Ingram | Opel Adam R2 | Not contested | | Not contested | |
| 2017 | (United Kingdom) Chris Ingram | Opel Adam R2 | Not contested | | (Germany) Marijan Griebel | Škoda Fabia R5 |
| 2018 | (Latvia) Mārtiņš Sesks | Opel Adam R2 | Not contested | | (Russia) Nikolay Gryazin | Škoda Fabia R5 |
| 2019 | (Spain) Efrén Llarena | Peugeot 208 R2 | Not contested | | (Czech Republic) Filip Mareš | Škoda Fabia R5 |
| 2020 | (Estonia) Ken Torn | Ford Fiesta Rally4 | Not contested | | (Sweden) Oliver Solberg | Volkswagen Polo GTI R5; Škoda Fabia R5 evo |
| 2021 | (France) Jean-Baptiste Franceschi | Renault Clio Rally4 | Not contested | | (Estonia) Ken Torn | Ford Fiesta Rally3 |
| 2022 | (Poland) Igor Widlak | Ford Fiesta Rally3 | (Spain) Oscar Palomo | Peugeot 208 Rally4 | (France) Laurent Pellier | Opel Corsa Rally4 |
| 2023 | (United Kingdom) Jon Armstrong | Ford Fiesta Rally3 | (Italy) Roberto Daprà | Peugeot 208 Rally4 | (Romania) Norbert Maior | Peugeot 208 Rally4 |
| 2024 | (Czech Republic) Filip Kohn | Ford Fiesta Rally3 | (Sweden) Mille Johansson | Opel Corsa Rally4 | (Sweden) Mille Johansson | Opel Corsa Rally4 |
| 2025 | (Poland) Tymoteusz Abramowski | Ford Fiesta Rally3 | (Sweden) Calle Carlberg | Opel Corsa Rally4 | (Sweden) Calle Carlberg | Opel Corsa Rally4 |
| 2026 | (Finland) Ville Vatanen | Ford Fiesta Rally3 | | | | |

=== Former support categories ===
| Season | Production Cup / ERC-2 | | ERC Junior / ERC Junior U27 / ERC-3 Junior | | Abarth Rally Cup | | Clio Trophy by Toksport WRT | |
| Season | Driver | Car | Driver | Car | Driver | Car | Driver | Car |
|---|---|---|---|---|---|---|---|---|
| 2013 | (Austria) Andreas Aigner | Subaru Impreza WRX STI R4 | Not contested | | Not contested | | Not contested | |
| 2014 | (Ukraine) Vitaliy Pushkar | Mitsubishi Lancer Evolution X R4 | (France) Stéphane Lefebvre | Peugeot 208 R2 | Not contested | | Not contested | |
| 2015 | (Hungary) Dávid Botka | Mitsubishi Lancer Evolution IX | (Sweden) Emil Bergkvist | Opel Adam R2 | Not contested | | Not contested | |
| 2016 | (Poland) Wojciech Chuchała | Subaru Impreza WRX STI N15 | (Germany) Marijan Griebel | Opel Adam R2 | Not contested | | Not contested | |
| 2017 | (Hungary) Tibor Érdi Jr. | Mitsubishi Lancer Evolution X | (United Kingdom) Chris Ingram | Opel Adam R2 | Not contested | | Not contested | |
| 2018 | (Hungary) Tibor Érdi Jr. | Mitsubishi Lancer Evolution X | (Latvia) Mārtiņš Sesks | Opel Adam R2 | Not contested | | Not contested | |
| 2019 | (Argentina) Juan Carlos Alonso | Mitsubishi Lancer Evolution X | (Spain) Efrén Llarena | Peugeot 208 R2 | (Italy) Andrea Nucita | Abarth 124 Rally RGT | Not contested | |
| 2020 | (Hungary) Tibor Érdi Jr. | Mitsubishi Lancer Evolution X | (Estonia) Ken Torn | Ford Fiesta Rally4 | (Italy) Andrea Mabellini | Abarth 124 Rally RGT | Not contested | |
| 2021 | (Spain) Javier Pardo | Suzuki Swift R4LLY S | (France) Jean-Baptiste Franceschi | Renault Clio Rally4 | (Poland) Dariusz Poloński | Abarth 124 Rally RGT | (Italy) Andrea Mabellini | Renault Clio RSR Rally5 |
| 2022 | Not contested | | Not contested | | Not contested | | (Argentina) Paulo Soria | Renault Clio RSR Rally5 |
| 2023 | Not contested | | Not contested | | Not contested | | Not contested | |

=== Ladies champions ===
| Season | Driver | Car |
|---|---|---|
| 1958 | (England) Pat Moss | Austin-Healey 100/4; Morris Minor 1000 |
| 1960 | (England) Pat Moss | |
| 1962 | (England) Pat Moss | |
| 1964 | (England) Pat Moss | |
| 1965 | (England) Pat Moss | |
| 1989 | (United Kingdom) Louise Aitken-Walker | |
| 2013 | (Australia) Molly Taylor | Citroën DS3 R3T |
| 2014 | (Bulgaria) Ekaterina Stratieva | Subaru Impreza |
| 2015 | (Bulgaria) Ekaterina Stratieva | Mitsubishi Lancer Evo IX |
| 2016 | (United Kingdom) Catie Munnings | Peugeot 208 R2 |
| 2017 | (Italy) Tamara Molinaro | Opel Adam R2 |
| 2018 | (Spain) Emma Falcón | Peugeot 208 R2 |
| 2019 | (Bulgaria) Ekaterina Stratieva | Peugeot 208 R2 |

== See also ==
- European Rally Trophy
- List of European Rally Championship drivers
