= Piazza Piave =

Square in Florence, Italy

Coordinates: 43.7665°N 11.2684°E

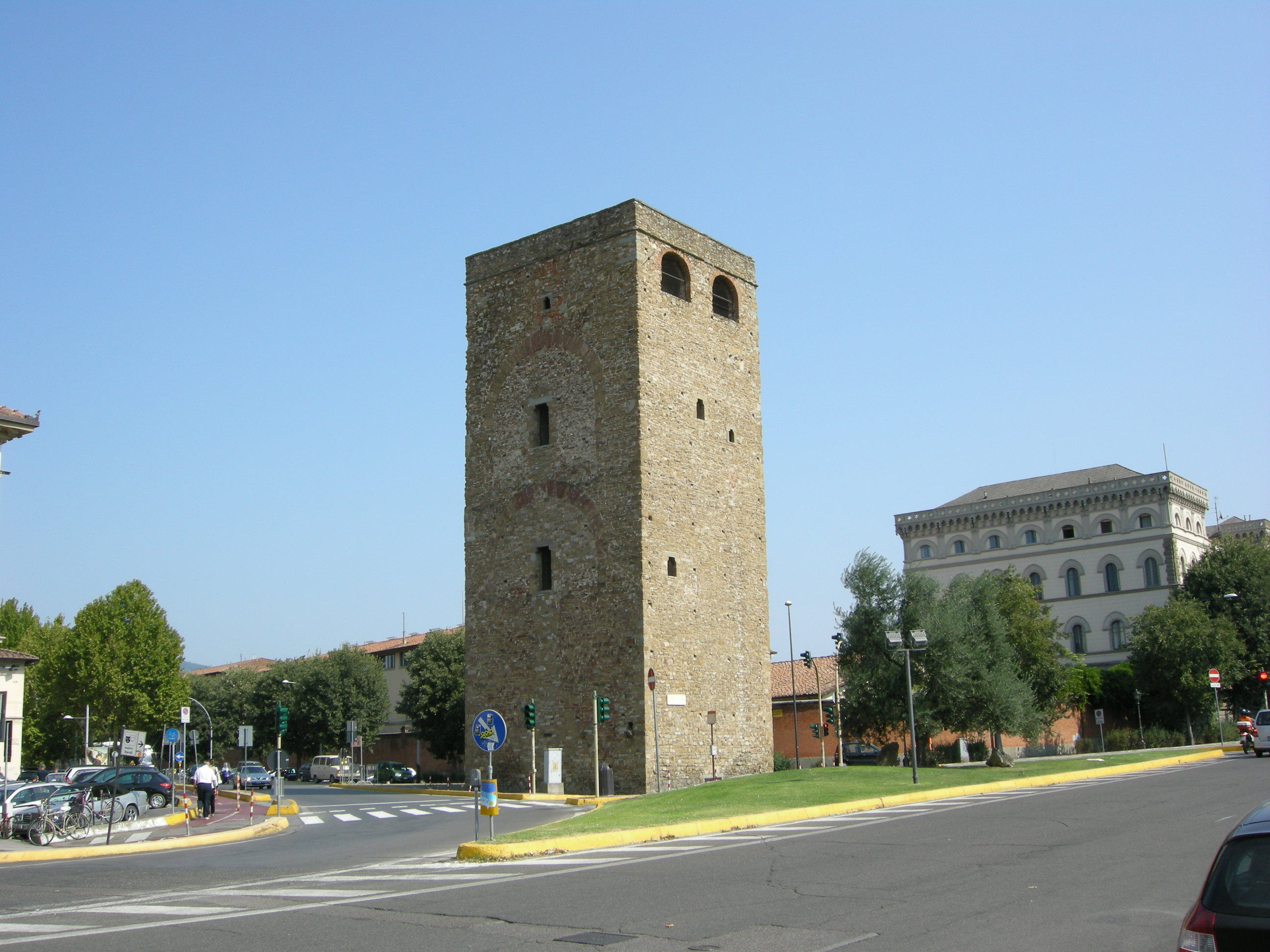
The Piazza with the Torre della Zecca

Piazza Piave is a square on the viali di Circonvallazione in Florence, Italy. It marks the eastern boundary of the historic city centre on the north bank of the river Arno. At its centre is the Torre della Zecca.

It marks the junction between five traffic arteries - the Lungarno della Zecca Vecchia, the Lungarno Pecori Giraldi, the viale della Giovine Italia, via dei Malcontenti and via Tripoli.

Inside the city wall, at the junction between via Tripoli and via dei Malcontenti, the square widens - this space is recorded on the carta del Buonsignori (1565) as the "Sepolture dei Giudei" or Jewish Cemetery. It was known as the Piazza della Zecca Vecchia until 1919, when it was renamed in honour of the Battle of Piave River.

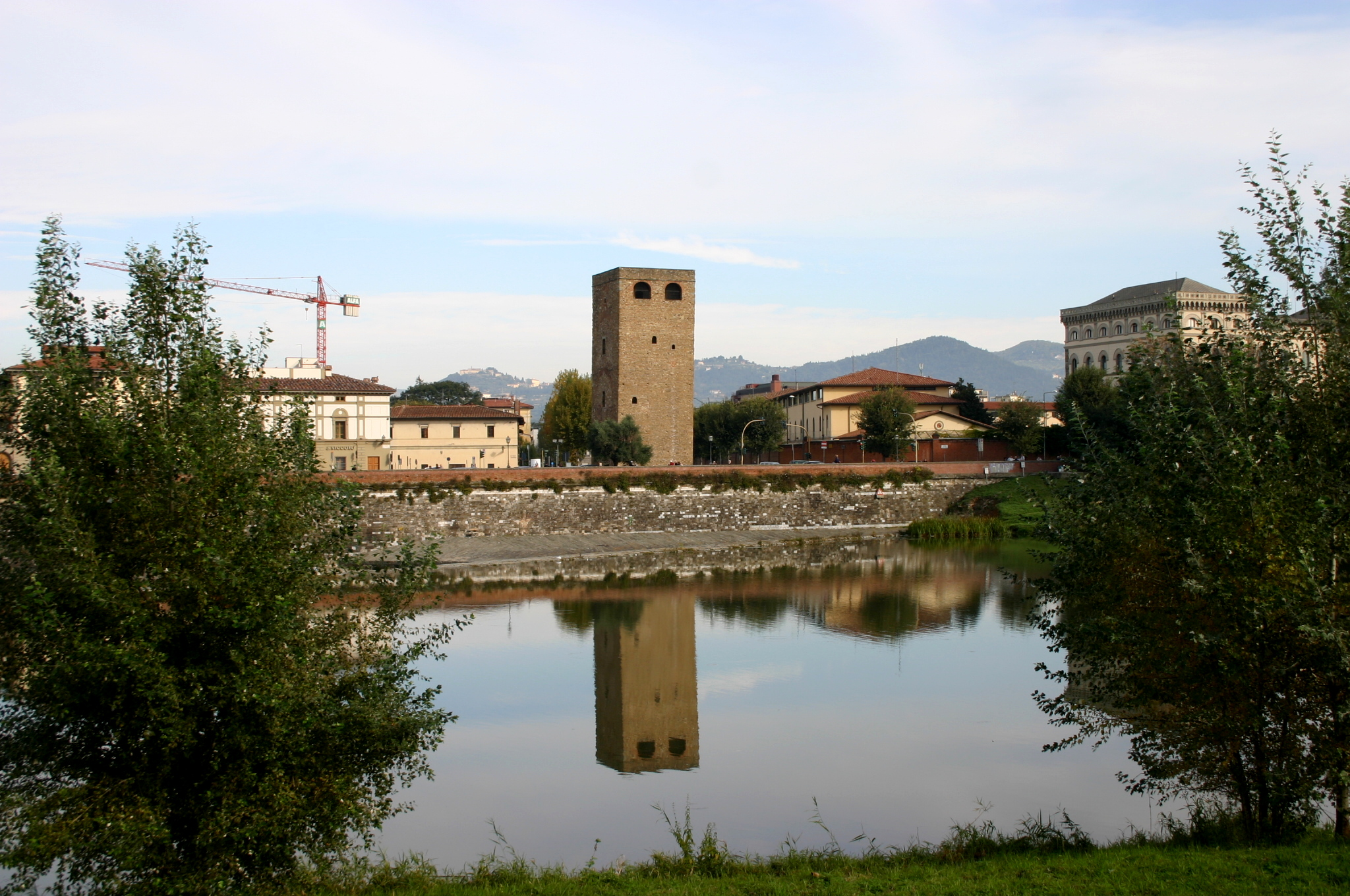
The Torre della Zecca, seen from the lungarno.

Several buses stop at the square, which is wheelchair accessible.

== See also ==
- Arno
