= Torricella Hospital =

Former hospital in Florence, Italy

Coordinates: 43°45′59″N 11°15′51″E

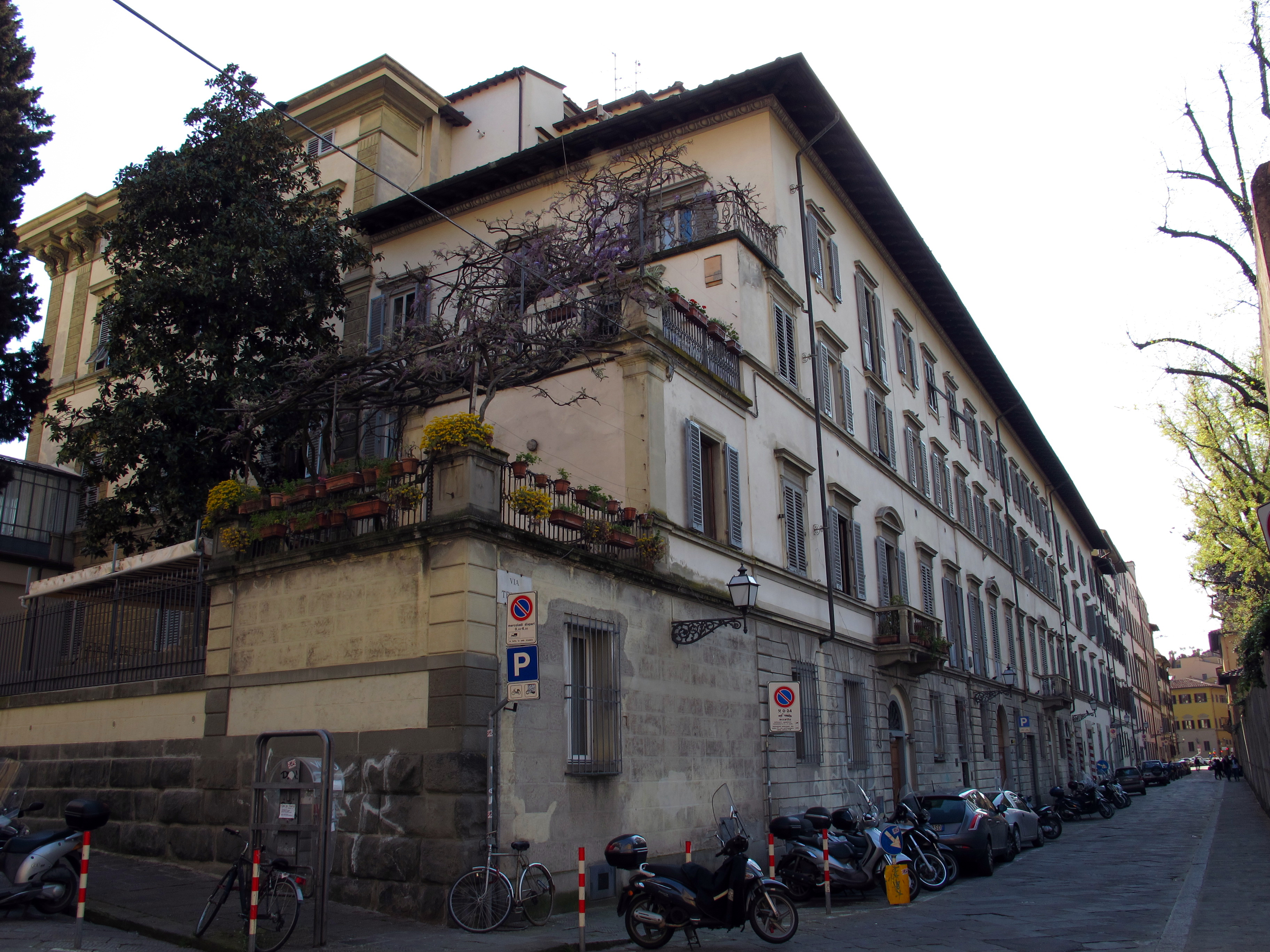
The former hospital buildings

The Toricella Hospital (Italian Ospedale dei Santi Filippo e Jacopo or Spedale della Torricella) was a hospital in Florence, Italy. It is first documented early in the 15th century and was funded by the Compagnia di San Niccolò. The nuns of San Miniato moved there sometime between 1500 and 1550, but moved out after the 1557 flood, handing the hospital over to the monks of the Florence Charterhouse.

== Bibliography ==
- Walther Limburger, Die Gebäude von Florenz: Architekten, Straßen und Plätze in alphabetischen Verzeichnissen, Leipzig, F.A. Brockhaus, 1910, n. 253.
- L'illustratore fiorentino. Calendari storico per l'anno ..., ed. Guido Carocci, Firenze, Tipografia Domenicana, 1910, p. 52.
- Osanna Fantozzi Micali, Piero Roselli, Le soppressioni dei conventi a Firenze. Riuso e trasformazioni dal sec. XVIII in poi, Firenze, Libreria Editrice Fiorentina, 1980, pp. 130–131.
- I restauri premiati dalla Fondazione Giulio Marchi dal 1967 al 1993, ed. Patrizia Pietrogrande, Firenze, Centro Di per Fondazione Giulio Marchi, 1994, pp. 78–79.
- Claudio Paolini, Architetture fiorentine. Case e palazzi nel quartiere di Santa Croce, Firenze, Paideia, 2009, p. 321, n. 454.
- Lauri Thorndyke, Three English Queens. In the footsteps of Queen Victoria, Queen Mary and Queen Elizabeth the Queen Mother, Florence, The British Institute of Florence, n.d. [2012].
