= Central-Northern Latian dialect =

Central Italian dialect

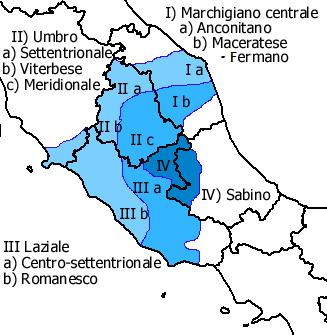
Central Italian dialects (Central-Northern Latian dialect: III a)

The Central-Northern Latian dialect (Laziale centro-settentrionale) is an Italian dialect belonging to the Central Italian dialects, of which it represents the southern offshoot.

== Territory ==
It is spoken in the Lazio (Latium) region, and in particular in the northern areas of the province of Frosinone (whose variants are often improperly defined as the Ciociaro dialect or more anciently Campanino), in the central-northern areas of the province of Latina, and in most of the Metropolitan City of Rome Capital, with the exception of the city of Rome, where the Romanesco dialect is widespread and which differs widely from the rest of the Latian dialects.

== Features ==
=== Phonetics ===
The central-northern Lazio is characterized, like the other Central Italian dialects and the Tuscan dialect but unlike the neighboring Southern Latian dialect and most of the other Italian dialects, by the presence of seven vowels, also typical of standard Italian.

== Judeo-Roman dialect ==
The Judaic-Roman dialect can be inserted within the Central-Northern Latian dialect, having diverged considerably from the Romanesco dialect after the establishment of the ghetto in 1555 and therefore not undergoing the influence of the Tuscan as strongly as the dialect of the capital. The dialect is now used for literary and theatrical works.

== See also ==
- Southern Latian dialect
