= Rally.TV =

Rallying championships streaming service

Rally.TV is the over-the-top official media service provider of the World Rally Championship, European Rally Championship and World Rallycross Championship that jointly provided by WRC Promoter GmbH and Rallycross Promoter GmbH, distributed digitally on connected TVs, smartphones, tablets, and on its website. A total of four languages are available for commentary.

== Features ==
The website is available globally offering a subscription-based streaming service, with live coverage of each event of the World Rally Championship, European Rally Championship and World Rallycross Championship series, along with real-time GPS tracking, onboard videos of every rally, and 2.5 hours of on-demand highlights videos every rally event.

== Establishment ==
Rally.TV was established in 2014, when the service was known as WRC+. WRC+ subscription OTT service was providing a couple of live stages per event, including the Power Stage at the end of each rally. With the introduction of WRC+ ALL Live in 2018, for the first time in the championship's history, every special stage from each round was shown as it happens, allowing the fans to follow the FIA World Rally Championship much better in 2018. The first rally that streamed all stages live was Rally Monte Carlo in January 2018.

WRC plus service plans are divided into two price tiers; the lowest includes limited access to the live coverage and the highest, allows access to all live coverage produced during rally event. Both are available on a monthly or yearly basis.

In January 2019, WRC+ All Live, launched live coverage with live commentary in Spanish for all live stages. German and Japanese were available since the 2021 Croatia Rally.

In August 2023, WRC+ was rebranded to Rally.TV by WRC Promoter GmbH, which featured two more series, European Rally Championship and World Rallycross Championship.
