= WRC Promoter GmbH =

German media company

- Type: Subsidiary
- Industry: Mass media
- Genre: Motorsport
- Headquarters: Munich, Germany
- Area served: Global
- Key people: Éric Boullier (CEO)
- Products: Rally.TV
- Brands: World Rally Championship; European Rally Championship
- Owner: Cosmobilis; Park Square Capital

WRC Promoter GmbH is a motorsport promoter and commercial rights holder based in Munich, jointly owned by Cosmobilis and Park Square Capital. The company is responsible for all commercial aspects of the World Rally Championship and the European Rally Championship, including broadcasting rights and merchandise sales, and onboarding participants and series sponsors.

== History ==
The company was formed when a joint venture between Red Bull GmbH and KW25 was announced as the new World Rally Championship promoter from the 2013 season, following the entering of administration of the previous promoter, Convers Sports Initiatives.

The company launched an over-the-top media service, WRC+, in 2014, offering a subscription-based streaming service that covers every World Rally Championship event. The service was rebranded to Rally.TV in 2023, featuring two more series, European Rally Championship and World Rallycross Championship.

In August 2024, it was reported that the company was for sale at a valuation of $550 million.

On 31 July 2026, it was announced that French automotive company Cosmobilis and investment firm Park Square Capital had acquired WRC Promoter GmbH. Éric Boullier was appointed as the chief executive officer of the organisation.
