= World Rally Championship =

Rallying championship series, highest level of rallying competition

- Category: Rallying
- Country: International
- Inaugural season: 1973
- Manufacturers: 3
- Tyre suppliers: Hankook
- Drivers' champion: (United Kingdom) Elfyn Evans (2026)
- Co-Drivers' champion: (United Kingdom) Scott Martin (2026)
- Manufacturers' champion: (Japan) Toyota (2026)
- Official website: WRC.com

The World Rally Championship (WRC) is an international rallying series owned and governed by the FIA. Inaugurated in 1973, it is the third oldest FIA world championship (after Karting World Championship and Formula One). Each season lasts one calendar year, and typically consists of 13 three- to four-day rally events driven on surfaces ranging from gravel and tarmac to snow and ice. Each rally is usually split into 15–25 special stages which are run against the clock on up to 350 kilometres (220 mi) of closed roads.

Separate championship titles are awarded to drivers, co-drivers and manufacturers. There are also two support championships, WRC2 and WRC3, which are contested on the same events and stages as the WRC, but with progressively lower maximum performance and running costs of the cars permitted. Junior WRC is also contested by younger drivers on five events of the World Rally Championship calendar.

== The championships ==
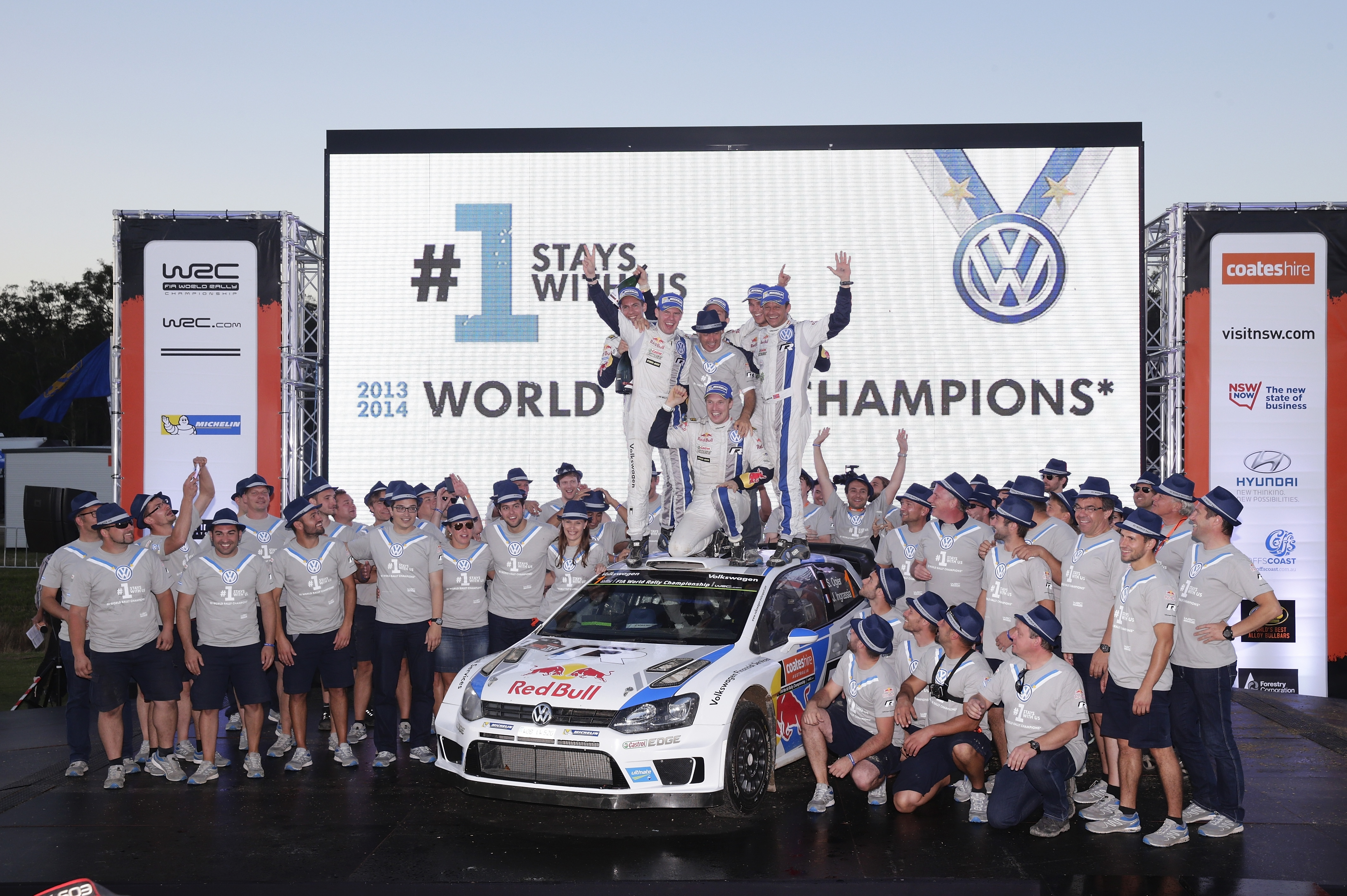
Volkswagen, champions of the WRC for Manufacturers, 2014

=== World Rally Championship for Manufacturers ===
Manufacturers must register to be eligible to score in the World Rally Championship for Manufacturers and must compete in every rally of the season with Rally1 specification cars (World Rally Car between 1997 and 2021).

As the manufacturers use the highest performance car and usually employ the best drivers, it is usually the case that these crews and cars take the majority of drivers/co-drivers championship points. Thus, combined with the money invested by the manufacturer teams, promotion of the WRC only tends to include the manufacturer crews and privateers in the Rally1 car or World Rally Car. These crews are given Priority 1 (P1) status on rallies and contest the stages before other crews. However it is not unusual for competitors in lower performance cars to take points in the drivers or co-driver's championships.

=== World Rally Championships for Drivers and Co-Drivers ===
Any crew entering any WRC rally are eligible to score points in the overall World Rally Championship for Drivers and World Rally Championship for Co-Drivers. This is regardless of car technical class, number of rallies entered or if they are also entered into the support championships. Although co-drivers are permitted to drive the cars at any point during the rally, they must only do so under a 'force majeure'.

=== Support championships ===
The World Rally Championship also features support championships called WRC2 and WRC3. These championships are contested on the same events and stages as the WRC calendar and have tighter restrictions on eligible car criteria.

==== WRC2 ====
WRC2 is contested using only Rally2 cars with championships for drivers, co-drivers and teams. Drivers and co-drivers can enter a maximum of 7 events and their best 6 results will count towards their championship tally. Teams must enter two cars into a maximum of 7 events, only 5 of 6 events entered in Europe will score, with points from a 7th rally entered outside Europe also scoring points towards the championship tally. Power stage points are also awarded. Drivers, co-drivers and teams must all nominate if they wish to be eligible for championship points before a rally and can do so independently. For that reason the same crew pair in the same team may compete in all events in a season yet nominate and score points in different events. Crews competing in WRC2 are given Priority 2 status and run the stages immediately after P1 crews. WRC2 replaced SWRC when Group R was introduced in 2013 and the eligibility rules relaxed.

In 2023, WRC2 Challenger Driver and Co-Driver Championships will run for WRC2 drivers who have not won the series before, or who have not driven for a manufacturer entry in the previous 5 years.

==== WRC3 ====
WRC3 is contested using only Rally3 cars (Rally2 in 2020 and 2021), with championships for drivers and co-drivers. Designed for privateer drivers, WRC3 has lower entry costs than WRC2 and there are restrictions on who can enter, testing and professional support received. Drivers and co-drivers can enter up to 7 rallies with their best 6 scoring championship points, and scoring rounds must also be nominated beforehand. Between 2013 and 2018, the championship was contested using two wheel drive cars from R1, R2 and R3 classes of Group R. No championship ran in 2019 but was reinstated in its current format in 2020. Crews competing in WRC3 are given Priority 3 status to run after the WRC2 crews.

==== Junior WRC ====
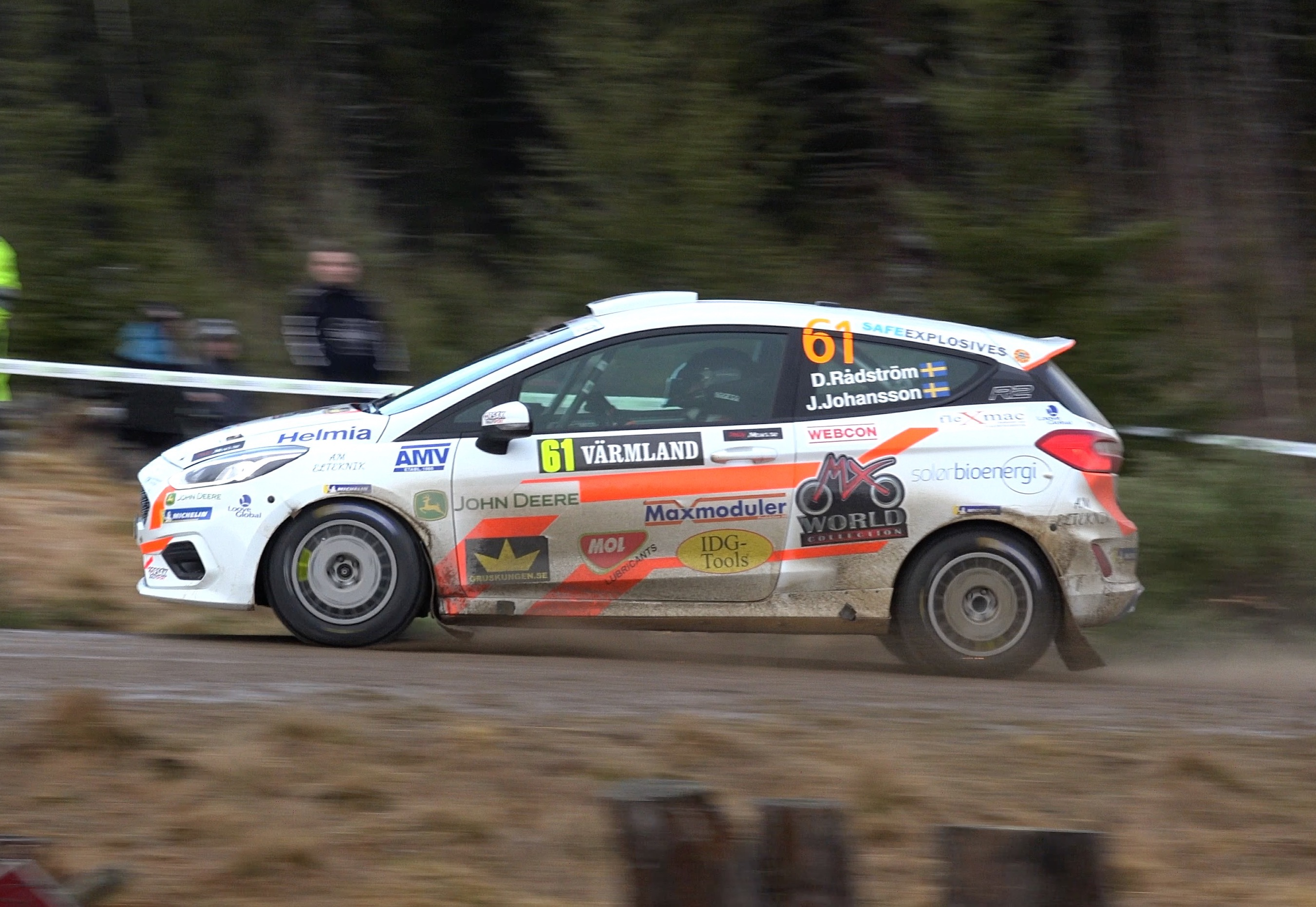
Dennis Rådström, Junior WRC, Rally Sweden 2020

Junior WRC is an arrive-and-drive format championship run over 5 events of the WRC calendar using Ford Fiesta Rally3 cars provided by M-Sport. Drivers have to be under 29 and must register. Championship titles are awarded to drivers and co-drivers, though there is no age restriction for co-drivers.

The Junior World Rally Championship was previously an open championship for younger drivers in S1600 cars from 2001. In 2011 it became a closed FIA sanctioned championship run by either M-Sport or Citroën in the current format. Ford Fiesta R2/Rally4 or Citroën DS3 R3 cars were provided, maintained and serviced for each entrant. Championships were awarded to drivers, co-drivers and nations. Only 5 rounds of the WRC calendar were competed with the best 4 results counting towards championship points, although the final round was worth double points. The highest scoring driver from each country registered points for the nations championship. Uniquely for this series, points were also awarded for stage wins.

==== WRC Masters Cup ====
In 2023 the FIA WRC Masters Cup ran for the first time. The cup is open to drivers and co-drivers over 50 years of age and may enter in any WRC eligible car except Rally1. The cup effectively replaces WRC2 Masters Cup which ran in 2022 for WRC2 entrants of the same criteria.

==== Discontinued support championships ====
- The WRC Academy was an alternative name for Junior WRC between 2011 and 2012, the first years the championship became a one-make series before reverting to the Junior WRC name.
- The World Rally Championship Ladies Cup ran from 1990 to 1995 and could be won by any class of car. Louise Aitken-Walker was the first winner.
- The Production car World Rally Championship (P-WRC) began in 1987 as the FIA Group N Cup before being renamed in 2002. Cars in the championship were production-based and homologated under Group N rules. From 2013, the Production WRC was renamed WRC3 including Group R cars with two-wheel drive (R3, R2 and R1).
- The 2-Litre World Rally Cup ran from 1993 to 1999 using front wheel drive cars with engine capacities up to 2000cc. With relaxed rules the cars could often outpace the Group A and World Rally Cars of the main category. The series was abandoned due to high costs and the Super 2000 and Super 1600 specification cars that the series inspired later became the origins for SWRC and JWRC.
- The Super 2000 World Rally Championship (S-WRC) was started in 2010 using Super 2000 category cars. There were competitions for drivers (known as the S-WRC) and another for teams (the World Rally Championship Cup). From 2013, WRC2 replaced S-WRC and including cars with four-wheel drive (R5, R4 and S2000).
- The WRC Trophy was run in 2017 for privateers entering with older World Rally Cars when the new WRC+ was introduced. Crews were eligible to enter up to seven rounds of the World Rally Championship, with their best six results counting towards their final points tally in the trophy. WRC Trophy entrants were still eligible to score World Rally Championship points separately to the WRC Trophy. The Trophy was discontinued after the 2017 season.
- WRC 2 Pro ran only in 2019 and was open to manufacturer-supported teams entering cars complying with Group R5 regulations. It was replaced in 2020 with the Rally2 based WRC3.

One-make series tournaments have also run on select rounds of the WRC calendar. They were privately administered rally tournaments but permitted to run on the rallies alongside the WRC. Examples include the Ford Fiesta Sporting Trophy (2006, 2007 and 2009) and DMACK Fiesta Trophy (2014–2016), both run by M-Sport, and Citroën Top Driver (2013) run by Citroën. Neither team held these tournaments in the years they had the rights to manage the JWRC on the FIA's behalf.

Evolution of the WRC Championships
	1970							1980										1990										2000										2010										2020
	3	4	5	6	7	8	9	0	1	2	3	4	5	6	7	8	9	0	1	2	3	4	5	6	7	8	9	0	1	2	3	4	5	6	7	8	9	0	1	2	3	4	5	6	7	8	9	0	1	2	3	4	5	6
Overall Championships	Manufacturers
Overall Championships					FIA Cup		Drivers and Co-Drivers
Support Championships															PWRC																										WRC 3 (2WD)							WRC 3
Support Championships																													JWRC																						JWRC
Support Championships																					2 Litre Cup																	SWRC			WRC 2

== History ==
=== Early ===
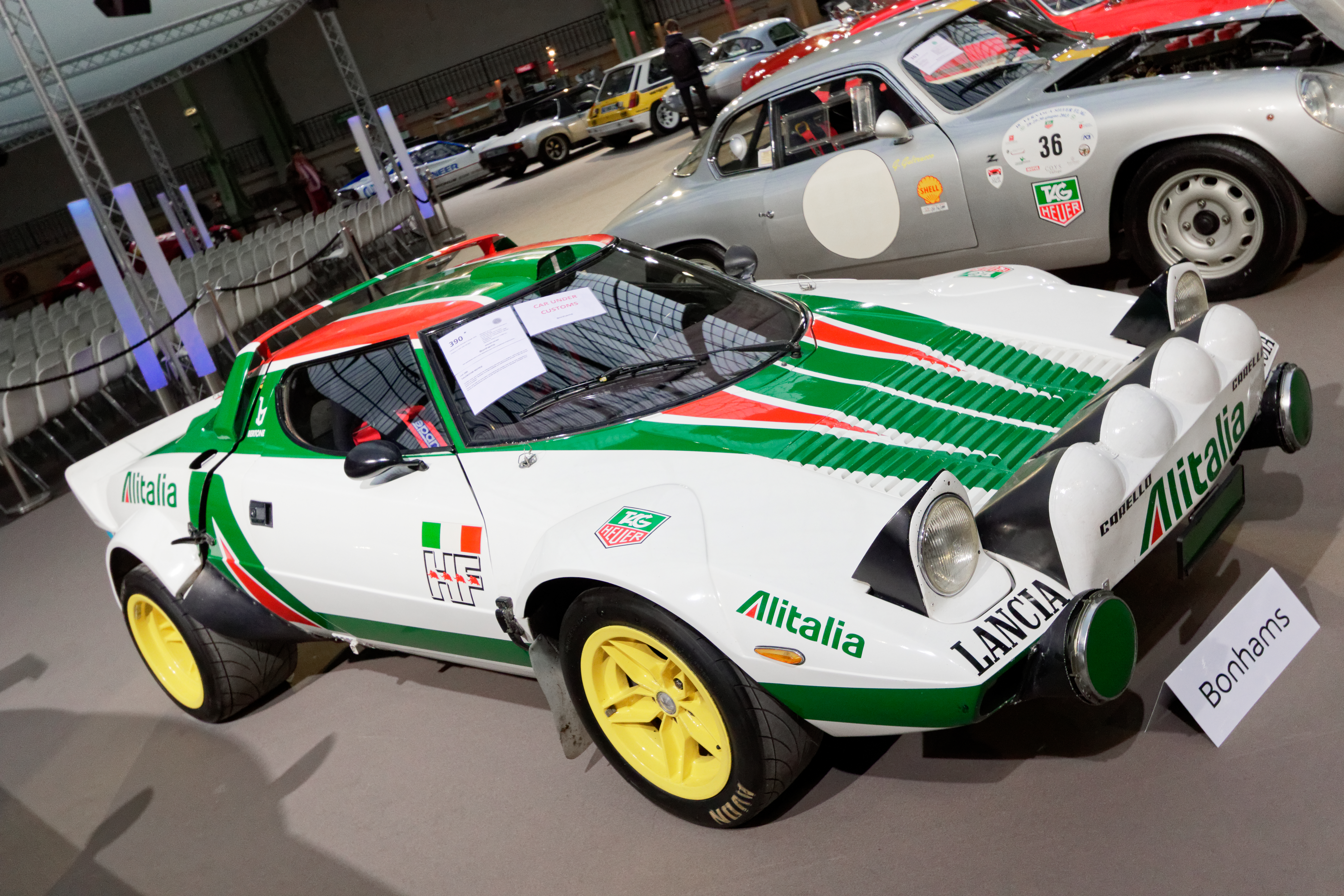
Group 4 Lancia Stratos HF

The World Rally Championship was formed from well-known international rallies, nine of which were previously part of the International Championship for Manufacturers (IMC), which was contested from 1970 to 1972. The 1973 World Rally Championship was the inaugural season of the WRC and began with the Monte Carlo Rally on 19 January.

Alpine-Renault won the first manufacturer's world championship with its Alpine A110, after which Lancia took the title in 1974, 1975 and 1976 with the Ferrari V6-powered Lancia Stratos HF, the first car designed and manufactured specifically for rallying. The first drivers' world championship was not awarded until 1979, although 1977 and 1978 seasons included an FIA Cup for Drivers, won by Italy's Sandro Munari and Finland's Markku Alén respectively. Sweden's Björn Waldegård became the first official world champion, edging out Finland's Hannu Mikkola by one point. Fiat took the manufacturers' title with the Fiat 131 Abarth in 1977, 1978 and 1980, Ford with its Escort RS1800 in 1979 and Talbot with its Sunbeam Lotus in 1981. Waldegård was followed by German Walter Röhrl and Finn Ari Vatanen as drivers' world champions.

=== Group B era ===
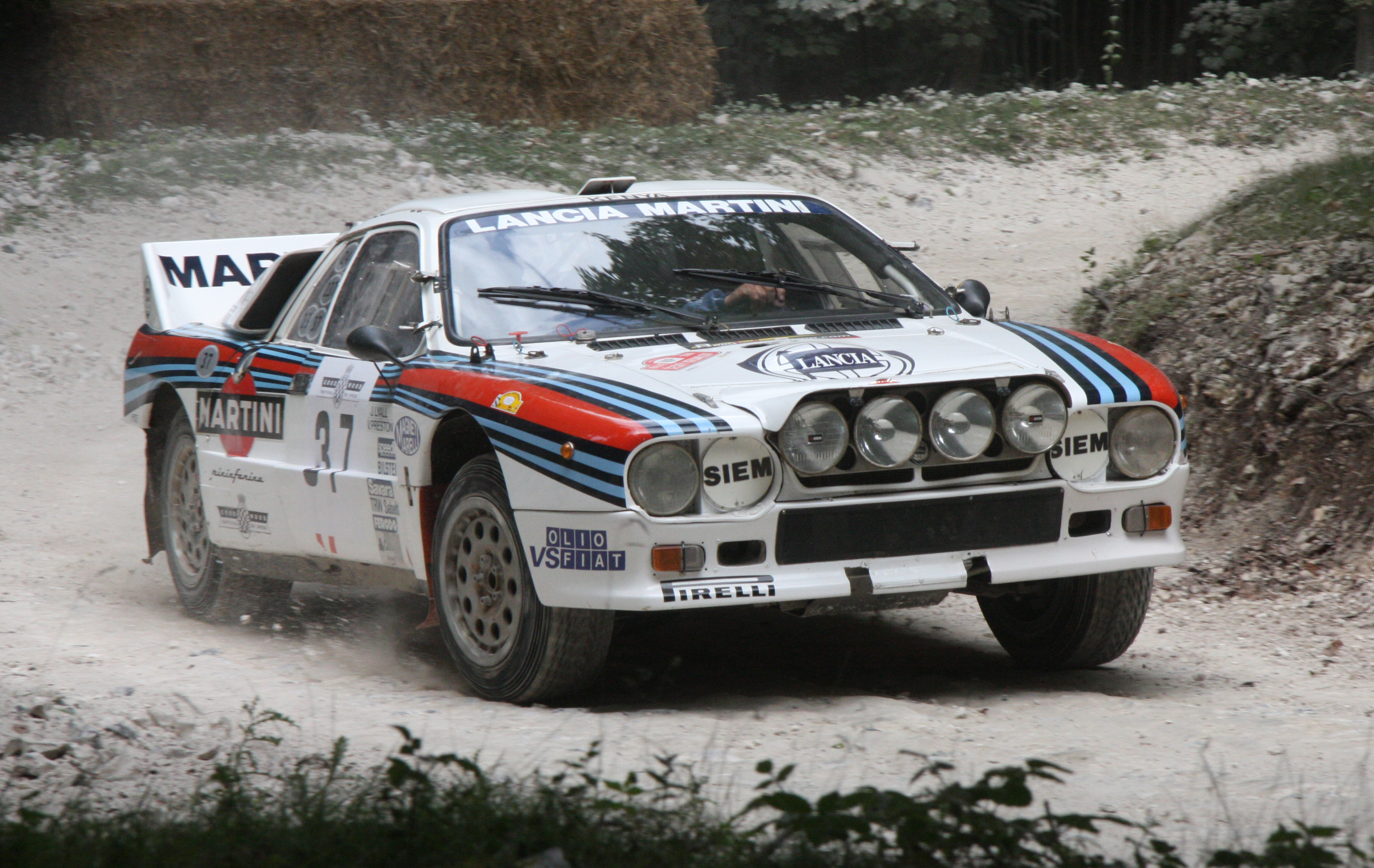
Lancia Rally 037, the last rear-wheel drive car to win the World Rally Championship.

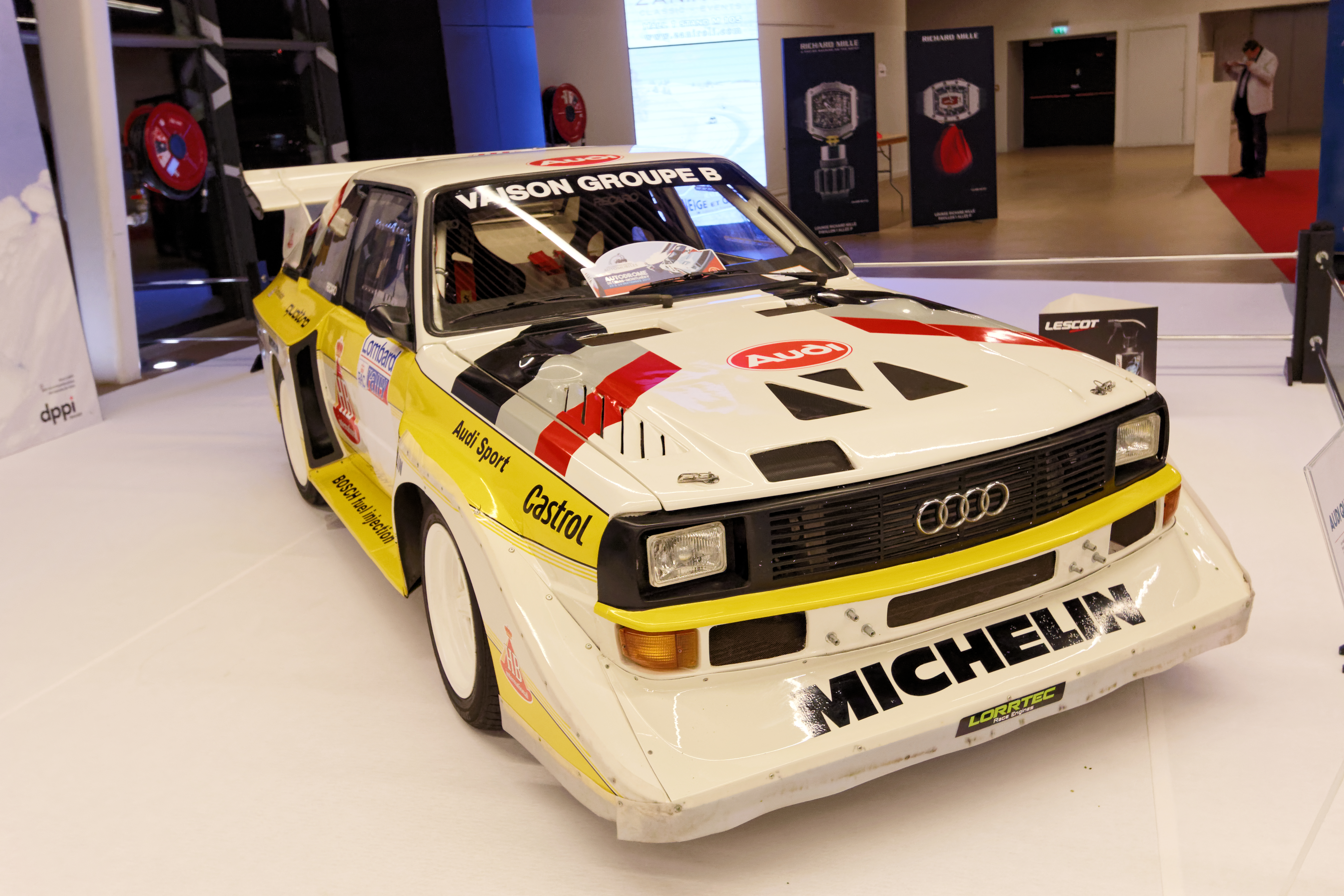
Group B Audi Quattro S1

The 1980s saw the rear-wheel-drive Group 2 and the more popular Group 4 cars be replaced by more powerful four-wheel-drive Group B cars. FISA legalized all-wheel-drive in 1979, but most manufacturers believed it was too complex to be successful. However, after Audi started entering Mikkola and the new four-wheel-drive Quattro in rallies for testing purposes with immediate success, other manufacturers started their all-wheel-drive projects. Group B regulations were introduced in 1982, and with only a few restrictions allowed almost unlimited power. Audi took the manufacturers' title in 1982 and 1984 and drivers' title in 1983 (Mikkola) and 1984 (Stig Blomqvist), but with Lancia still winning the 1983 manufacturers' title with the rear-drive Lancia 037, the last rear-drive car winning a world championship. Audi's French female driver Michèle Mouton and her co-driver Fabrizia Pons came close to winning the drivers' title in 1982, but had to settle for second place after Opel rival Röhrl. The 1985 title seemed set to go to Vatanen and his Peugeot 205 T16 but a bad accident at the Rally Argentina left him to watch compatriot and teammate Timo Salonen take the title instead. Italian Attilio Bettega had an even more severe crash with his Lancia 037 at the Tour de Corse and died instantly.

The 1986 season started with impressive performances by Finns Henri Toivonen and Alén in Lancia's new turbo- and supercharged Delta S4, which could reportedly accelerate from 0–60 mph (96 km/h) in 2.3 seconds, on a gravel road. However, the season soon took a dramatic turn. At the Rally Portugal, three spectators were killed and over 30 injured after Joaquim Santos lost control of his Ford RS200. At the Tour de Corse, championship favourite Toivonen and his co-driver Sergio Cresto died in a fireball accident after plunging down a cliff. Only hours after the crash, Jean-Marie Balestre and the FISA decided to freeze the development of the Group B cars and ban them from competing in 1987. More controversy followed when Peugeot's Juha Kankkunen won the title after FIA annulled the results of the San Remo Rally, taking the title from fellow Finn Markku Alén.

=== Group A era ===
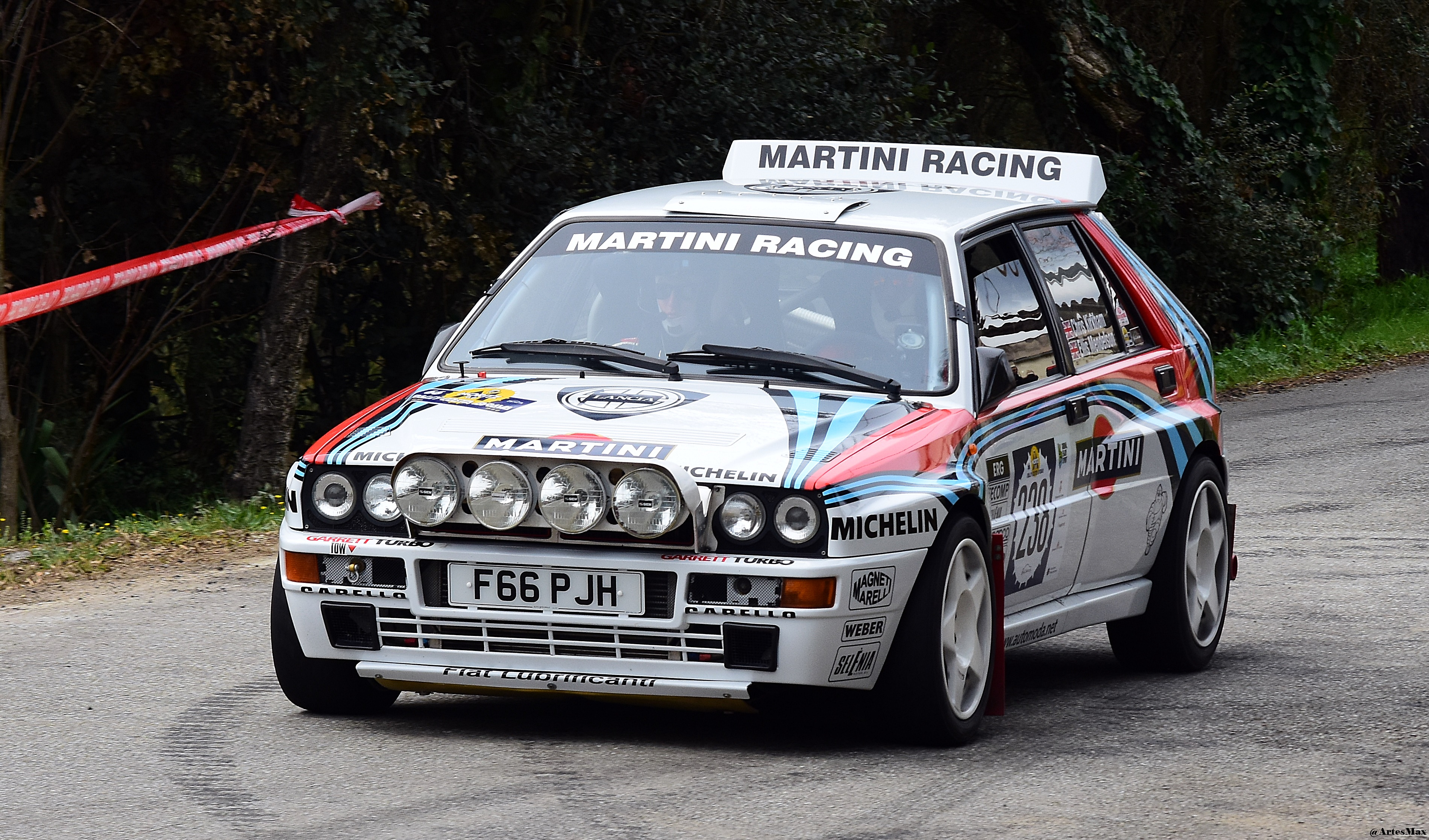
Group A Lancia Delta HF Integrale. With 10 manufacturers' championship titles, including 6 won consecutively, Lancia has more than any other marque.

As the planned Group S was also cancelled, Group A regulations became the standard in the WRC until 1997. A separate Group A championship had been organized as part of the WRC already in 1986, with Sweden's Kenneth Eriksson taking the title with a Volkswagen Golf GTI 16V. Lancia was quickest in adapting to the new regulations and controlled the world rally scene with Lancia Delta HF, winning the manufacturers' title six years in a row from 1987 to 1992 and remains the most successful marque in the history of the WRC. Kankkunen and Miki Biasion both took two drivers' titles with the Lancia Delta HF. The 1990s then saw the Japanese manufacturers, Toyota, Subaru and Mitsubishi, become title favourites. Spain's Carlos Sainz driving for Toyota Team Europe took the 1990 and 1992 titles with a Toyota Celica GT-Four. Kankkunen moved to Toyota for the 1993 season and won his record fourth title, with Toyota taking its first manufacturers' crown. Frenchman Didier Auriol brought the team further success in 1994, and soon Subaru and Mitsubishi continued the success of the Japanese manufacturers. Scotsman Colin McRae won the drivers' world championship in 1995 and Subaru took the manufacturers' title three years in a row. Finland's Tommi Mäkinen driving a Mitsubishi Lancer Evolution won the drivers' championship four times in a row, from 1996 to 1999. Mitsubishi also won the manufacturers' title in 1998. Another notable car was the Ford Escort RS Cosworth, which was specifically designed for rallying. It was the first production car to produce downforce both at front and rear.

=== World Rally Car era ===
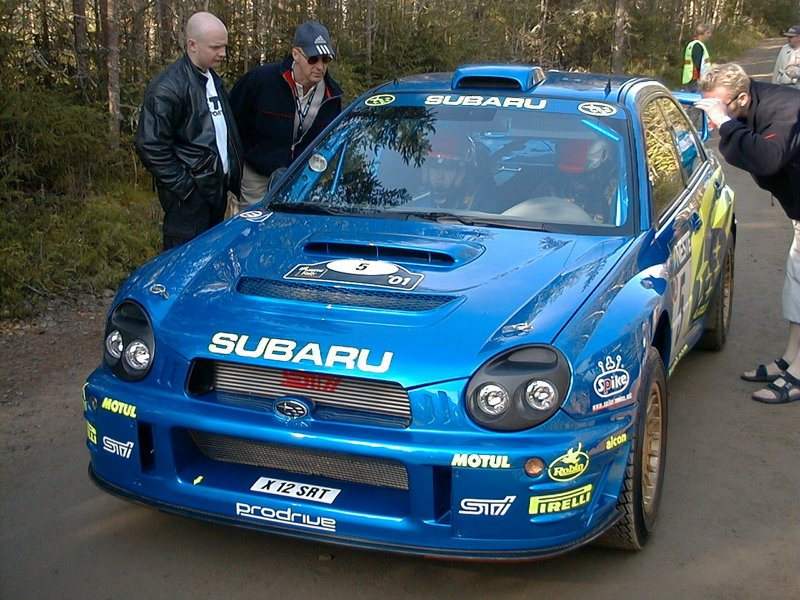
Richard Burns in his Subaru Impreza WRC after a Finnish stage

For the 1997 World Rally Championship, the World Rally Car regulations were introduced as an intended replacement for Group A (only successive works Mitsubishis still conforming to the older formula; until they, too, homologated a Lancer Evolution WRC from the 2001 San Remo Rally). After the success of Mäkinen and the Japanese manufacturers, France's Peugeot made a very successful return to the World Rally Championship. Finn Marcus Grönholm took the drivers' title in his first full year in the series and Peugeot won the manufacturers' crown. England's Richard Burns won the 2001 title with a Subaru Impreza WRC, but Grönholm and Peugeot took back both titles in 2002. 2003 saw Norway's Petter Solberg become drivers' champion for Subaru and Citroën continue the success of the French manufacturers. Citroën's Sébastien Loeb went on to control the following seasons with his Citroën Xsara WRC. Citroën took the manufacturers' title three times in a row and Loeb surpassed Mäkinen's record of four consecutive drivers' titles, earning his ninth consecutive championship in 2012. Suzuki and Subaru pulled out of the WRC at the end of the 2008 championship, both citing the economic downturn then affecting the automotive industry for their withdrawal. Mini and Ford both pulled out of the WRC at the end of the 2012 championship, due to a similar economic downturn affecting the European market, although Ford continued to give technical support to M-Sport. Volkswagen Motorsport entered the championship in 2013 and Sebastien Ogier dominated the series with six consecutive titles. Hyundai also returned to the series in 2014. New World Rally Car rules were introduced for 2017 which generated faster and more aggressive cars.

In 2018, Toyota Gazoo Racing WRT won the World Rally Championship earning Toyota their first manufacturers' title since 1999. With Tommi Mäkinen heading the team, he became the first person in the history of rally driving to win a Championship both as a driver and as a team principal. At the end of the following year, Citroën withdrew from the championship after Ogier left the team. Ott Tänak took the driver's title breaking the French Sebastien's (Loeb and Ogier) domination of the sport since 2004. Hyundai meanwhile, took the manufacturers championship title and repeated the success in 2020. Ogier returned to championship winning ways for 2020 and 2021 in a Toyota Yaris, though vowed that the new era of Rally1 would not be fully contested by himself. WRC said goodbye to the World Rally Car in 2021 after 25 years.

=== Rally1 era ===
Beginning in the 2022 season, the technical specifications were overhauled to produce the Rally1 car, with the goal of reducing costs and more closely reflecting modern consumer cars. This included the introduction of a hybrid electric power system. However the hybrid system proved difficult and expensive to repair mid-race, so was dropped for the 2025 season. Only three manufacturers (Ford, Hyundai and Toyota) have competed in the Rally1 era, with Toyota winning the first four manufacturers championships in a row. However the driver's championship became more competitive, with Kalle Rovanperä and Thierry Neuville winning their first titles.

== Format and structure ==
=== Calendar ===
Each WRC season consists of a number of rounds within the same calendar year and should ordinarily include rallies on a minimum of 3 continents. In the past the championship has visited every continent except Antarctica. Most recently there have been about 13 rallies though there have been as few as 7 such as in 2020 due to COVID-19 pandemic. The rallies are typically driven on surfaces ranging from gravel and tarmac to snow and ice.

=== Rallies ===
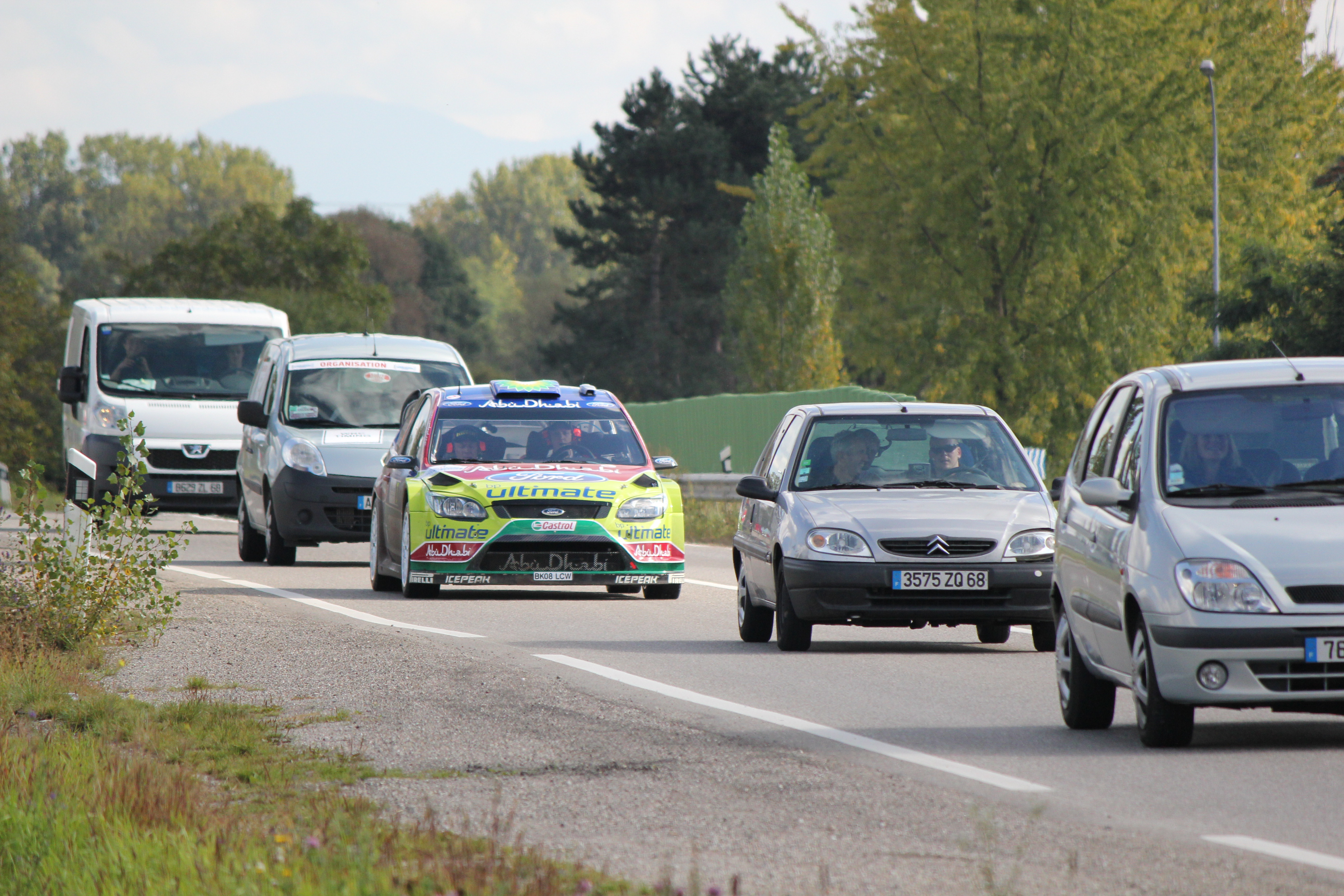
Ford Focus RS WRC on a road section, Rally de France Alsace 2010

The competitive special stages are driven on closed roads which are linked by non-competitive road sections known as liaisons. These roads are open to the public and all road laws of that country must be adhered to. The liaison routes are detailed in a road book given to each crew and must also be adhered to within a specified time limit to arrive at the next stage or time control point or else they face penalties. To help organise this, crews carry a timecard which is filled in at each time control or special stage by an official. An average day consists of a total of 400 kilometres (250 mi) of driving.

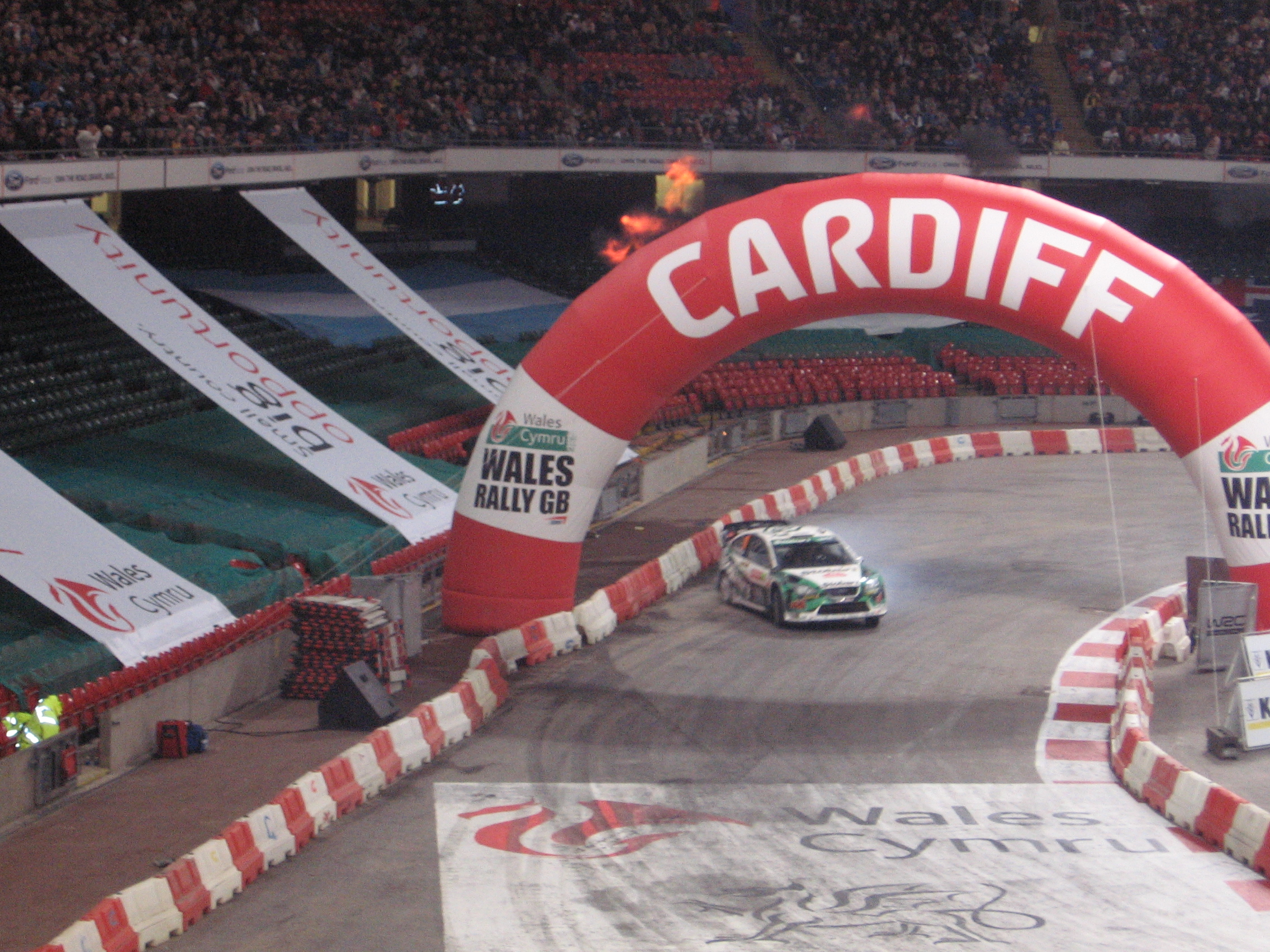
Cardiff Millennium Stadium super special stage, Wales Rally GB 2006

In the current era each rally usually consists of between fifteen and thirty special stages of distances ranging from under 2 km (1.2 mi) to over 50 kilometres (31 mi), not totalling more than 350 kilometres (220 mi). Any stage which deviates from the character of the rally or ordinary running of a special stage is known as a super special stage. These are often short and for spectators or promotional purposes and may be on a different surface such as asphalt on a gravel character rally, or they may be a head-to-head running where two cars start at the same time at different points in a loop format.

Since 2021 rallies must consist of only one surface type except where short super special stages are permitted that do not require a change in the car's setup. In the past some rallies such as Sanremo or Rally Spain have had one day of gravel followed by another day of asphalt stages, requiring substantial changes in the setup of the car. Asphalt setups have 18" wheels compared to 13" on gravel or snow, combined with changes needed to the differentials, suspension travel and geometry.

A WRC event begins with reconnaissance (recce) on Tuesday and Wednesday, allowing crews to drive through the stages and create or update their pace notes. On Thursday, teams can run through the shakedown stage to practice and test their set-ups. The competition typically begins on either Thursday evening or Friday morning and ends on Sunday with the Power Stage. Cars start the stages at two-minute intervals in clear weather, or three-minute intervals if it is decided that visibility may be a problem for competitors.

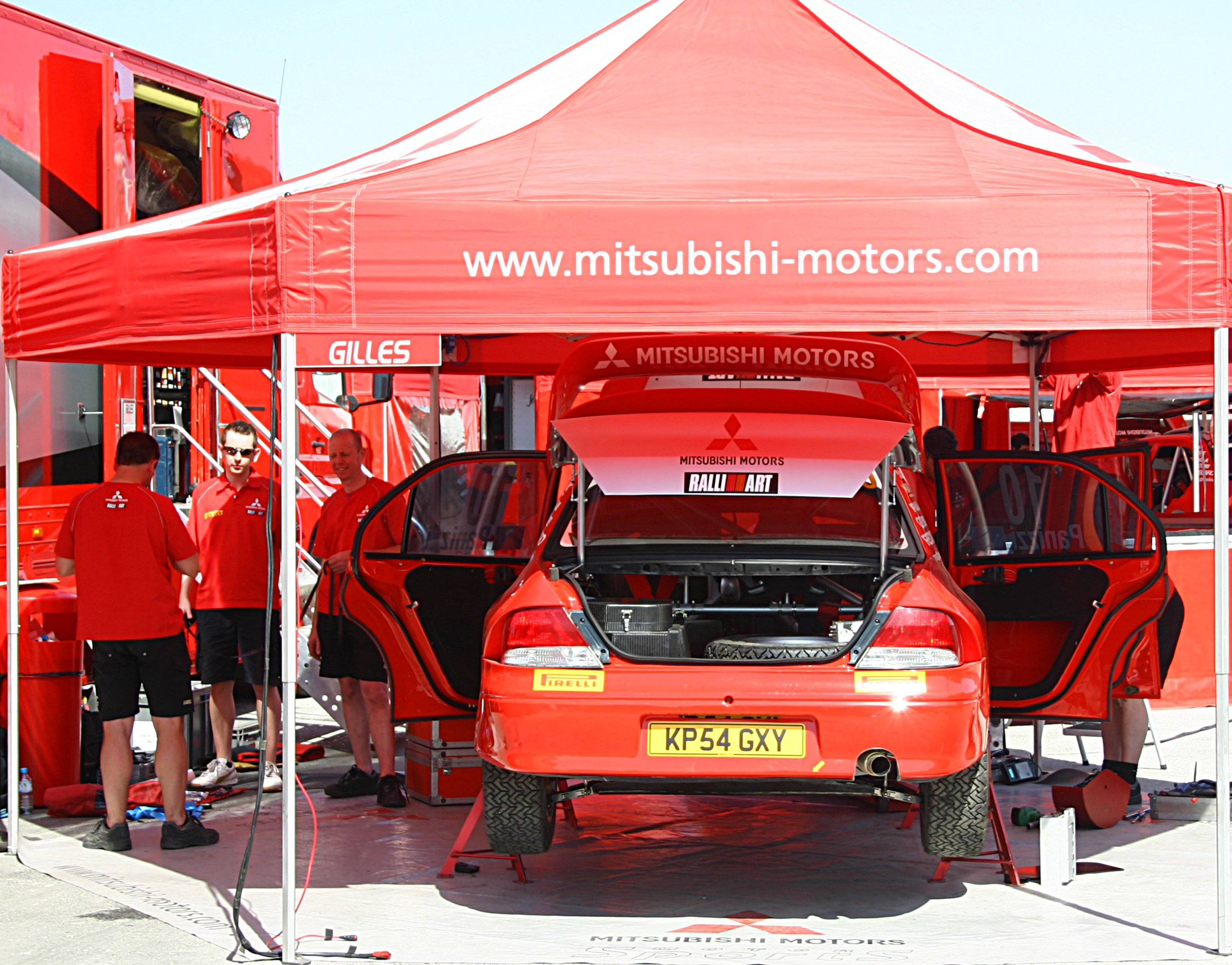
Mitsubishi service park at the 2005 Cyprus Rally

Each rally has one central service park where the cars are prepared and repaired if needed at the end of each loop and leg, however some rallies may organise a remote service and/or tyre fitting zone nearer to the stages during a leg. How much time can be spent working on the car once the rally has started is outlined in the rally's itinerary. Between the days, after a final end of day service, cars are locked away in parc fermé, a quarantine environment where teams are not permitted to access or work on their cars.

=== Championship points ===
Points are awarded at the completion of each rally and contribute towards the world championship classifications, and those with the most points at the end of the season are given the championship titles. Up to the 2023 season, points were awarded to the top positions in the overall final classification of each rally, and from 2011, extra points for the Power Stage were introduced. A new points system was introduced for the 2024 season which did not include results in the final classification.

The driver's championship and manufacturer's championship are separate but based on a similar point system. Manufacturers must nominate up to three crews to be eligible for manufacturer championship points before an event. The two fastest nominated crews from each manufacturer form a new classification for the purpose of awarding manufacturer points. Retired crews cannot score points unless they have restarted and it is not unusual for a crew to finish far down the overall classification yet still score manufacturers points.

A driver can win the driver's championship driving one car while a different manufacturer wins the manufacturer's championship. This has occurred on several occasions, most recently in 2018, 2019, 2020 and 2024.

=== Power Stage ===
First introduced in 2011, the "Power Stage" is the final stage of the rally and is typically televised live and immediately followed by the rally's podium celebrations. Additional World Championship points are available to the five fastest drivers and co-drivers through the stage regardless of where they actually finish in the rally. The fastest team receiving five points, the second-fastest receiving four points, etc. and the fifth-fastest receiving one. In 2021 manufacturers began scoring power stage points following a similar system to the classification points, where only the top two nominated from each team can be eligible. While normal Special Stages are timed with an accuracy to the tenth of a second, the "Power Stage" timing is to the thousandth of a second.

=== Restarting after retirement ===
Crews are permitted to restart the following day if they are forced to retire. For each stage not completed however, a ten-minute penalty plus the winning stage time in the same priority group is added to the overall time. Originally known as SuperRally when introduced and later renamed Rally 2, the rules allow for a better return on investment for competitors and more action for spectators. The Rally 2 name was dropped in 2019 as restarting became the norm, indeed crews are expected and assumed to be restarting unless they register a permanent retirement with the clerk of the course. The name was also dropped to avoid confusion with the new Rally2 group of car. Restarting is still at the discretion of the organisers, such as meeting safety standards after a heavy accident.

== Cars ==
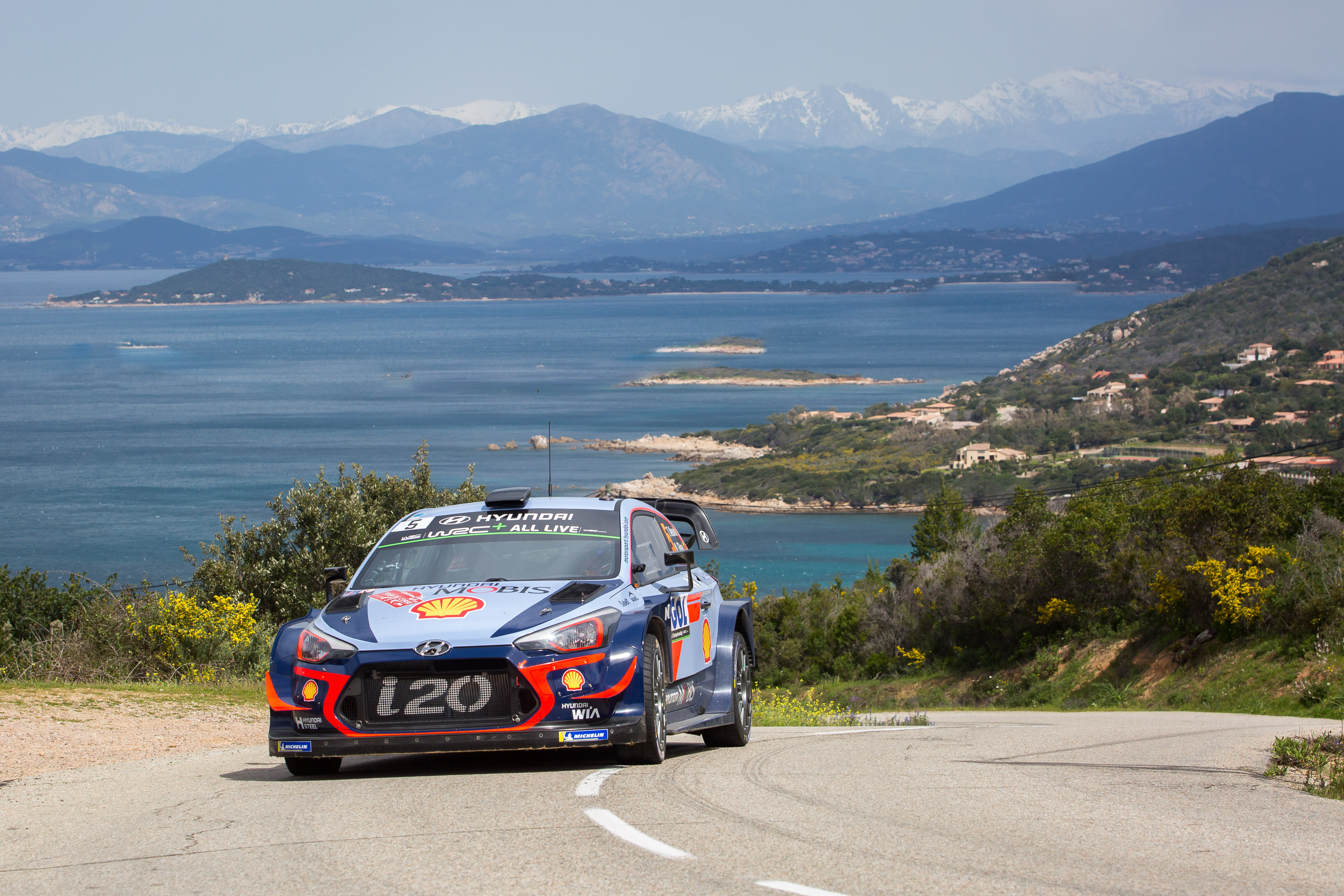
Thierry Neuville and Nicolas Gilsoul at the 2018 Tour de Corse in a Hyundai i20 Coupe WRC

The rules surrounding which cars are used in WRC are governed and approved by the FIA. From the WRC's inception, cars had always followed a basic rule of being Category I, 'Series Production Cars' with a minimum production requirement to achieve homologation by the FIA. This ceased to be the case when Rally1 cars were introduced for the 2022 season. Rally1 regulations placed them in Category II as 'Competition Cars', which are built as single examples for exclusive use in competition.

The rules have changed over time to suit economic conditions, for safety reasons, to advance technology, to attract more manufacturer entrants or to better promote the series. Specifications of cars used can be for just one type, such as the World Rally Car, or a Group of similar specifications that differ in performance such as Group R. In 2014, the FIA introduced the current sporting classes to help further categorise the different classes and groups based on performance. RC1 has the highest performance cars whilst RC5 has the lowest permitted at WRC level.

To enter a WRC rally in 2025, cars must be homologated in one of the following groups: World Rally Car 1.6L, any of the Groups Rally and R3 or R-GT of Group R

=== World Rally Car 1.6L ===
Eligible cars with 1.6L direct injection turbo engines and four-wheel drive built to World Rally Car regulations. The power output is limited to around 280 kW (380 hp). The 'WRC+' cars including the Ford Fiesta WRC, Toyota Yaris WRC and the Hyundai i20 Coupe WRC cannot be driven by those who had scored points for a manufacturer team in the previous 5 seasons. Earlier WRC cars since 2011, such as the Volkswagen Polo R WRC are permitted without such restrictions. 2021 was the final season of this specification at the top of the sport, being replaced by Rally1 in the manufacturer's championship in 2022.

=== Groups Rally ===
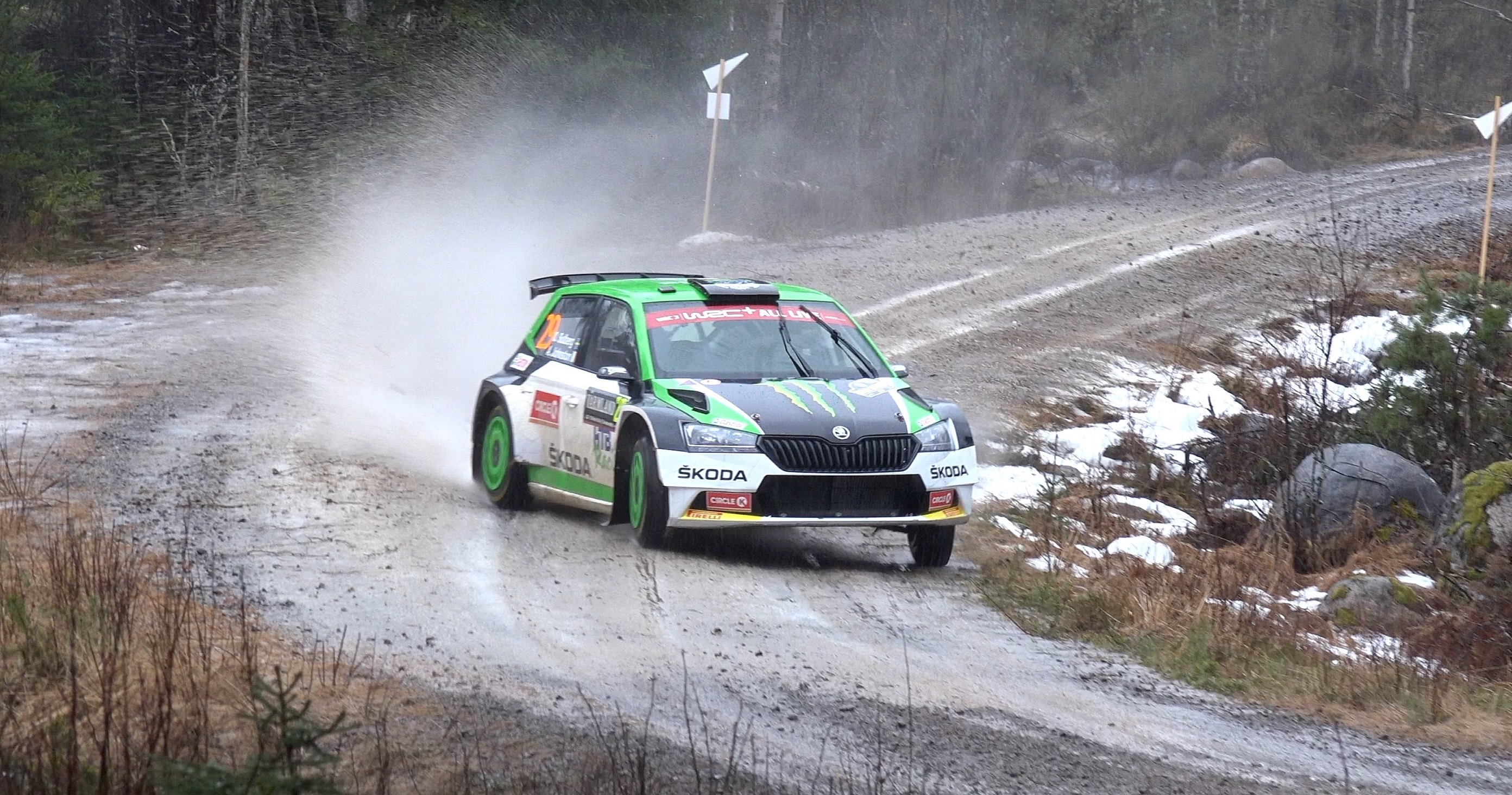
Oliver Solberg and Aaron Johnston on Rally Sweden 2020 in a Škoda Fabia Rally2 evo

The Groups Rally consists of six rally car specifications eligible for WRC.

- Rally1 cars were introduced in 2022 and replaced the World Rally Car as the car permitted in the manufacturer's championship. Hybrid powertrains were introduced for the first time in rallying amongst cost-cutting initiatives such as centrally developed tubular safety structures and simpler suspension and transmissions.
- Rally2 cars, formerly R5 of Group R, are the second highest performance cars and are the sole cars eligible for WRC-2.
- Rally2-Kit cars, previously known as R4-kit in Group R, are also eligible for overall entry. Rally2 and Rally2-Kit are within the same sporting category — RC2.
- Rally3 cars were introduced in 2021 and used in WRC3 from 2022.
- Rally4 cars, formerly R2 of Group R, do not have a specific support championship.
- Rally5 cars, formerly R1 of Group R, do not have a specific support championship.

=== Group R ===
Starting in 2008, a category of rally cars known as Group R were introduced as a rally only replacement to the Group A and Group N categories which were slowly phased out of eligibility. Cars were classified under one of six categories based on their engine capacity and type, wheelbase, and drivetrain. Group R cars still had to be homologated in Group A or N but have the relevant Group R extension approved in common with other rally formulae. As a result, older cars could reclassify under Group R subject to meeting criteria.

With R5, R4, R2 and R1 of Group R being renamed and absorbed by the new Groups Rally, as of the 2026 season, R3 and R-GT cars remain eligible for overall entry. R3 cars however have been downgraded to RC4 sporting class from RC3, in line with Rally4 cars rather than superseding them. Neither R3 or R-GT have specific WRC support championships.

=== Historically eligible cars ===
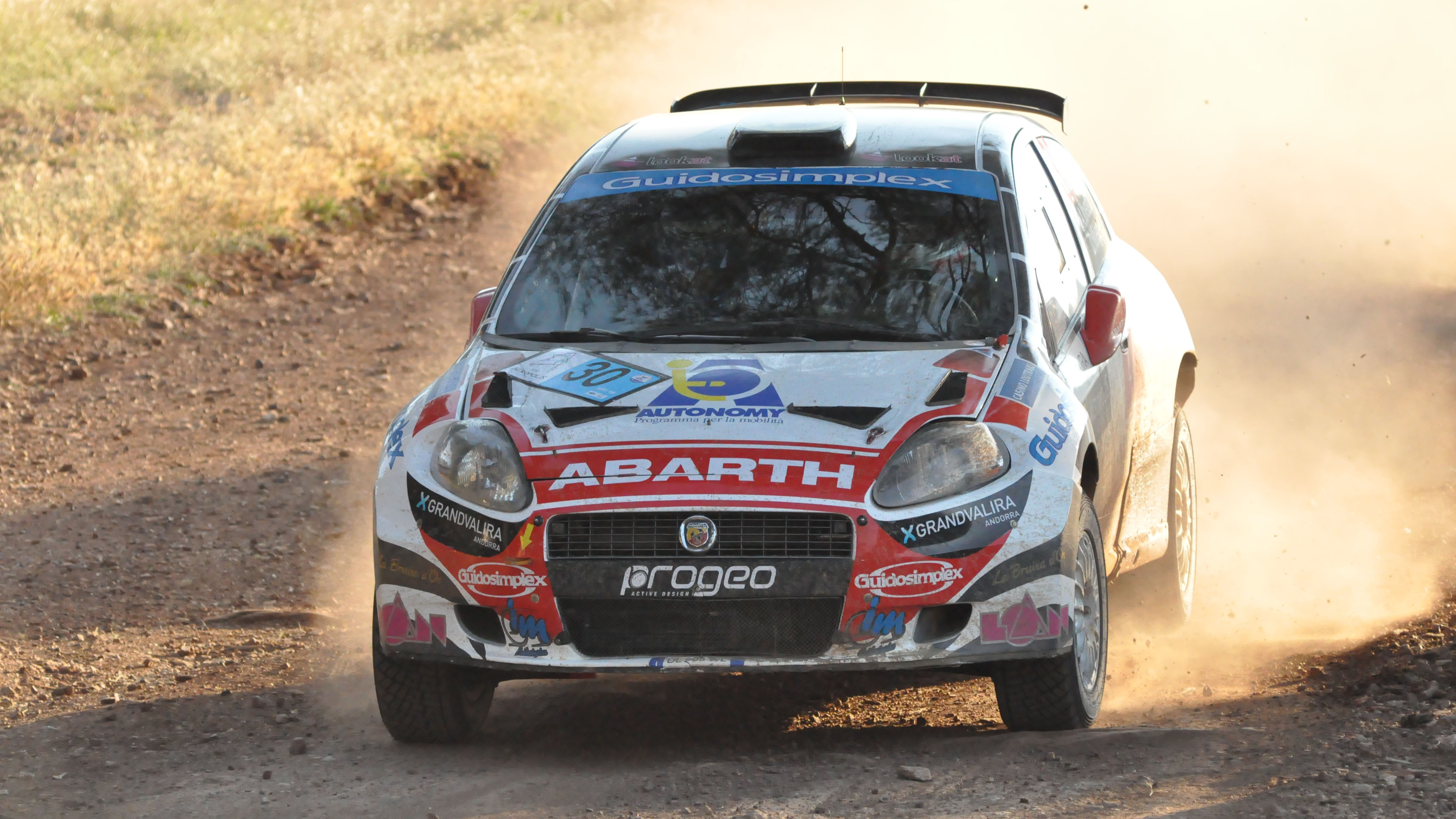
Fiat Grande Punto Abarth S2000

When the WRC began in 1973, FISA allowed cars from its Group 1 (series-production touring cars), Group 2 (touring cars), Group 3 (series-production grand touring cars) and Group 4 (modified grand touring cars) amongst national classes. These FISA classes were also used in circuit racing and other motorsport championships. The groups formed the basis of new groups in 1982, Group N replaced Group 1, Group A replaced Group 2, and Group B replaced Group 4. Due to the increasing power, lack of reliability and a series of fatal accidents during the 1986 season, Group B was permanently banned. In 1987 Group A became the highest performance car and the choice for manufacturers whilst privateers opted for the budget friendly Group N for use in the newly created Production Car World Rally Championship. A Group N car has won a WRC rally only once - a Renault 5 driven by Alain Oreille won the Rallye Côte d'Ivoire in 1989. Despite the PWRC ending in 2012, Group N cars were allowed to enter WRC2 until 2016 and overall rallies until the end of 2018.

In 1997, the World Rally Car specification was introduced to ease the development of new cars and bring new makes to the competition. An extension of Group A, the WRC cars were used in the manufacturer's championship, although Mitsubishi received special dispensation to run their Group A models into 1999, and won three drivers and one manufacturers championships whilst doing so. In 2011 changes were made to the World Rally Car, the engine capacity was restricted to 1.6L and the minimum length requirement removed to allow for smaller and cost-effective models. Further changes in 2017 allowed for more aero-dynamics, increased safety requirements and a larger air intake restrictor, which increased the effective power from 300 to 380 hp.

Super 2000 cars were allowed to enter the overall rallies from 2007 to 2018. They were eligible in the PWRC from 2007 to 2009 before the Super 2000 World Rally Championship was run between 2010 and 2012. They were also accepted in WRC2 from 2013 to 2016. Super 1600 cars were only allowed to enter in JWRC and on events that the championship was held on up to 2010 before the R2 became the sole championship car.

Evolution of Car Groups and Classes used in the WRC Manufacturers Championship
	1970							1980										1990										2000										2010										2020
	3	4	5	6	7	8	9	0	1	2	3	4	5	6	7	8	9	0	1	2	3	4	5	6	7	8	9	0	1	2	3	4	5	6	7	8	9	0	1	2	3	4	5	6	7	8	9	0	1	2	3	4	5	6
Series Production	Group 4										Group B
Series Production	Group 3
Series Production	Group 2										Group A														World Rally Car 2.0L														World Rally Car 1.6L
Series Production	Group 1										Group N
Competition Car																																																		Rally1

Summary of Car Groups and Classes otherwise permitted to enter rallies or in support championships
		1980			1990										2000										2010										2020
		7	8	9	0	1	2	3	4	5	6	7	8	9	0	1	2	3	4	5	6	7	8	9	0	1	2	3	4	5	6	7	8	9	0	1	2	3	4	5	6
Group N	N4 (>2.0L)	PWRC																										WRC2
Group N	N1-N3 (<=2.0L)	PWRC						PWRC; 2.0L Cup							PWRC							PWRC; JWRC				PWRC		WRC2
Group A	A8 (>2.0L)
Group A	A5-A7 (<=2.0L)							2.0L Cup														JWRC
Group A	Super 1600															JWRC Only
Group A	Super 2000																					PWRC			SWRC			WRC2
Group A	WRC 1.6L
Group R & Groups Rally	R1 (Rally5)																						JWRC			PWRC		WRC3
Group R & Groups Rally	R2 (Rally4)																						JWRC			JWRC; PWRC		JWRC; WRC3	WRC3			JWRC; WRC3		JWRC
Group R & Groups Rally	R3																						JWRC			PWRC		WRC3	JWRC; WRC3			WRC3
Group R & Groups Rally	RGT
Group R & Groups Rally	R4 / (Rally2-Kit)																									SWRC; PWRC		WRC2		Excl-Europe
Group R & Groups Rally	R5 (Rally2)																											WRC2							WRC2; WRC3		WRC2
Group R & Groups Rally	Rally3																																				WRC3

=== Tyres ===
Historically, multiple brands have provided tyres to competitors. Pirelli was the single tyre supplier for the top class from 2008 to 2010, then Michelin from 2011 to 2020, and Pirelli again from 2021 to 2024. Hankook was announced as the exclusive tyre supplier from 2025 to 2027.

WRC competitors use different tyres for dry and wet asphalt, gravel, snow and ice with studs or no studs, with different compound hardness also available. Hand cutting a tread pattern is not permitted.

For the 2023 season, Rally1 entries may use a maximum 28 tyres per round.

== Promotion and coverage ==
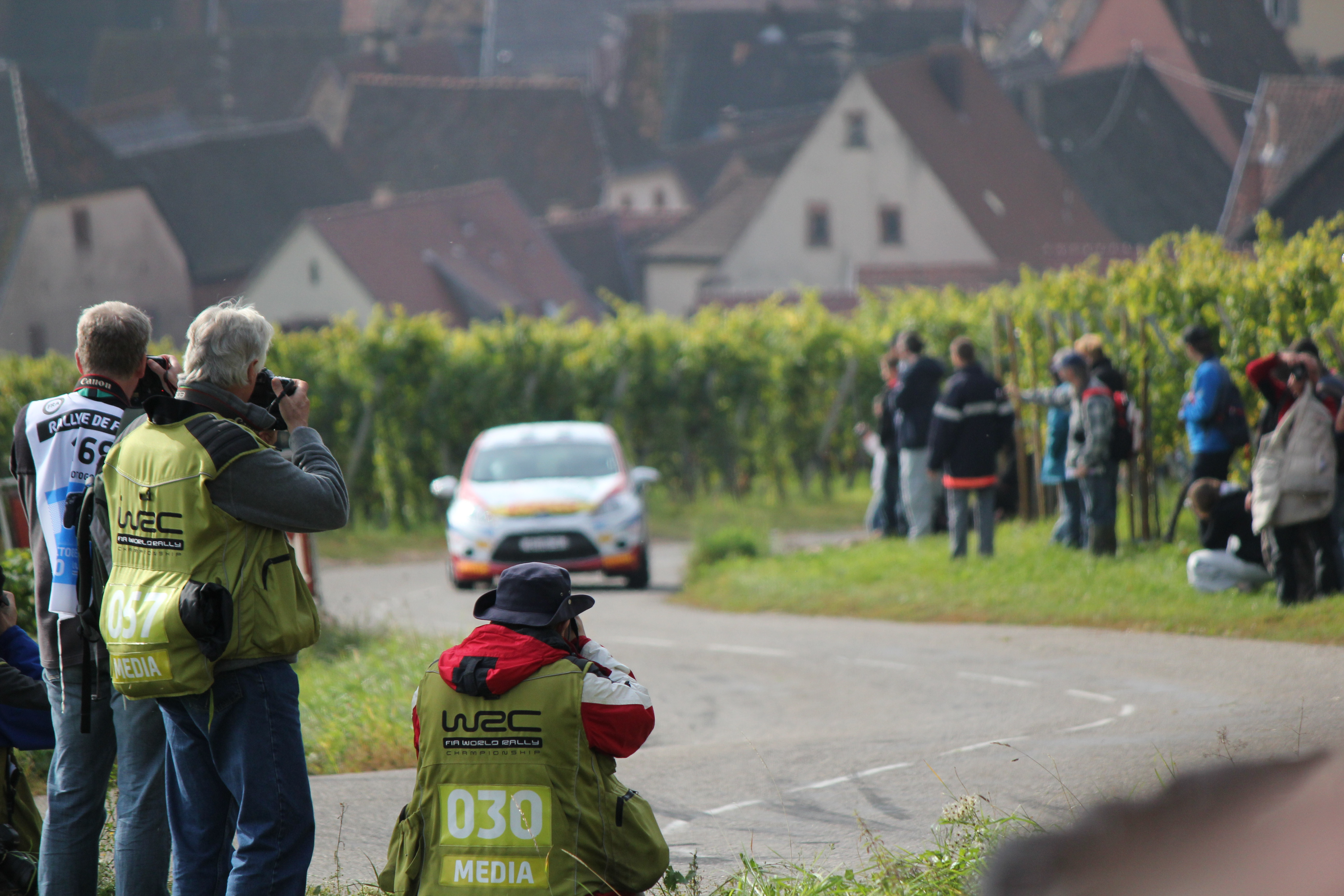
WRC accredited photographers, Rallye de France Alsace 2010

WRC Promoter GmbH owns the commercial rights to the series and is responsible for media coverage, sponsorship operations and encouraging participation in the championships. The company has served as the promoter since the 2013 season and was jointly owned by Red Bull Media House and KW25 Beteiligungs GmbH until July 2026 when the company was acquired by French automotive technology and services company Cosmobilis and private credit investor Park Square Capital. Former Formula One team principal Éric Boullier was appointed chief executive officer following the acquisition.

Through the Red Bull Content Pool, WRC has provided news, articles and images to professional news and media outlets free of charge. The WRC.com website and mobile applications provide news, live rally times and results, championship standings and information about the rallies and championships.

Commercial rights to the championship were first sold in 1996 to International Sportsworld Communicators (ISC), a company owned by Bernie Ecclestone who also held an FIA presidential position at the time. ISC was sold in 2000 to a group led by the then Subaru team boss David Richards, who later sold the company to North One Television in 2007. In 2009, ISC was awarded a 10-year contract to act as the first promoter for the championship from 2010. This new relationship included the FIA handing over responsibilities such as proposing new events and recruiting new sponsors. The contract with North One Sports (renamed from ISC) was cancelled by the FIA ahead of the 2012 season after the company entered into administration the previous year. The current promoter, WRC Promoter GmbH, was announced as the new promoter from the 2013 season.

=== Internet video ===
In 2014, a digital subscription service named WRC+ was launched providing video clips and live transmission of some stages each rally, including the power stage, as well as onboard footage and live map tracking of competitors. With the introduction of WRC+ All Live in 2018, for the first time in the championship's history, every special stage from each round was shown for selected cars with commentary available in English. For the 2019 season, commentary in Spanish was available for all stages. German and Japanese were available since the 2021 Croatia Rally.

During the 2023 season, the WRC+ All Live service was replaced by a new service, Rally.TV, which amalgamated the service with a similar offer covering the FIA World Rallycross Championship. As well as offering a live service of all European Rally Championship rounds, a linear TV channel shows footage and documentaries between events, covering the three championships.

Brief and free video footage is also provided via social media platforms. In addition, the first running of Shakedown is often shown live on YouTube and Facebook.

Red Bull also produce feature-length programmes for Red Bull TV using stage footage from WRC TV combined with their own presenting team and insight from guest pundits. Dirtfish.com also provide some video content in a similar way, though usually not as long.

=== WRC TV ===
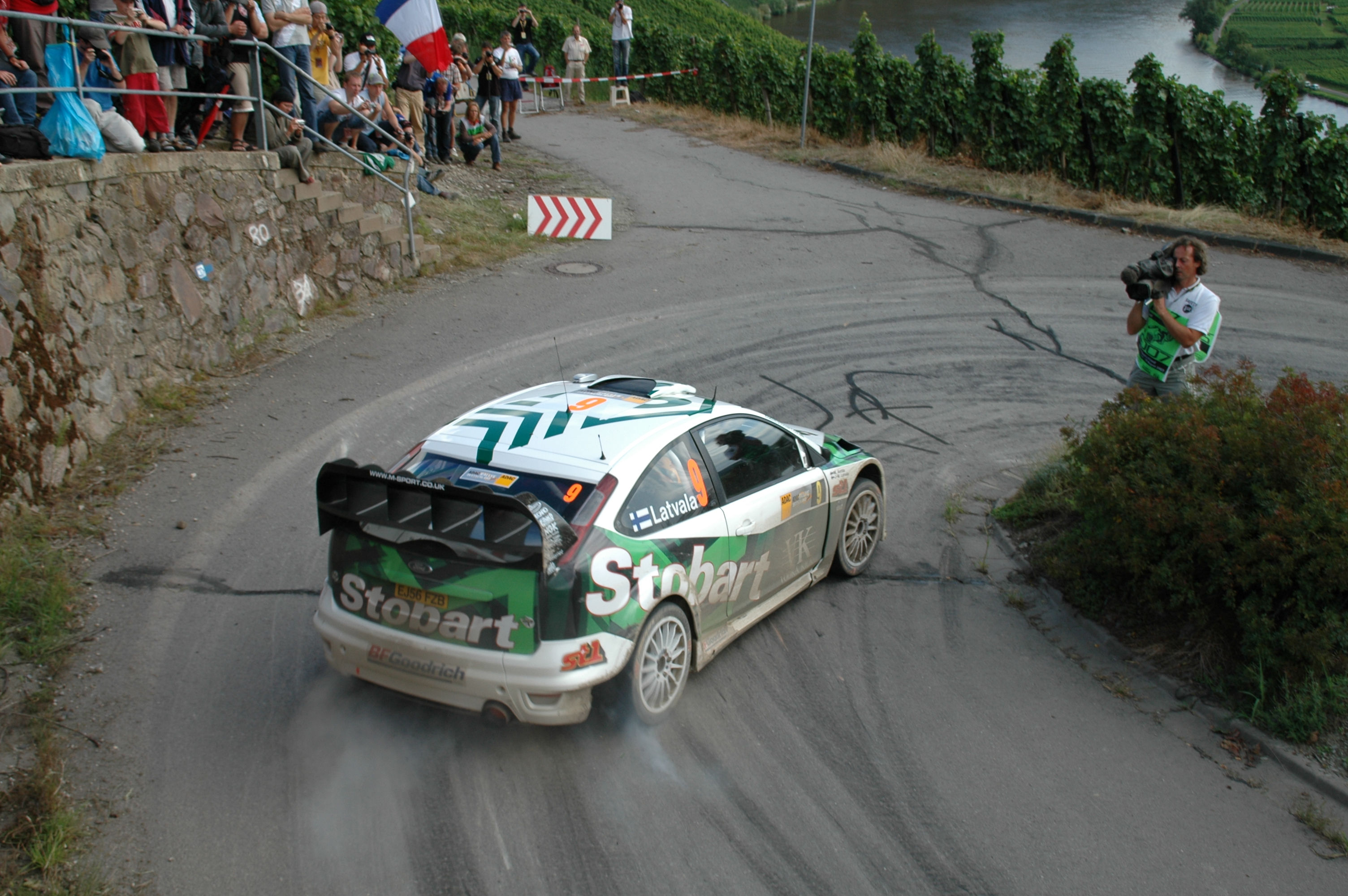
A camera operator at a hairpin turn at the 2007 Rallye Deutschland

WRC TV produces previews, daily highlights and event reviews for each rally, as well as other magazine shows such as season reviews for broadcast television. Some TV stations also broadcast the power stage and select other stages live, usually two stages on a Saturday and the first run of what will be the power stage. Further, TV stations may broadcast the entire All Live live stream, typically via an interactive channel.

The make up and format for these programmes can vary from country to country depending on the local broadcaster and prominence of local drivers. In 2016, the cumulative worldwide TV audience for WRC TV's programmes was more than 700 million, growing to 836 million in 2019. The programming is available in over 150 markets and more than 12,000 hours were screened globally in 2016, reducing to under 10,000 hours in 2019.

=== Radio ===
Live radio/audio coverage of the rallies was provided in English by a free service called World Rally Radio, broadcast via the Internet by Crown House Media. The service featured end of stage reports direct from the drivers and teams, up to date results and stage times plus other news in the service park. It also produced podcasts and featured contemporary music during breaks in rally coverage. World Rally Radio ceased in 2018 when WRC+ All Live began.

=== Podcasts ===
An official podcast is frequently produced. The latest version Backstories has interviewed drivers and co-drivers since 2020.

== Records and statistics ==
=== Manufacturers ===
21 different manufacturers have won a World Rally Championship event: Citroën, Ford, Lancia, Toyota, Peugeot, Subaru, Volkswagen, Mitsubishi, Audi, Fiat, Hyundai, Datsun/Nissan, Opel, Renault, Renault-Alpine, Saab, Mazda, BMW, Mercedes-Benz, Porsche and Talbot. With a further 11 having finished on the podium: Seat, Mini, Vauxhall, Alfa Romeo, Volvo, Ferrari, MG, Polski Fiat, Škoda, Triumph and Wartburg. Lancia, with ten Manufacturer's Championships, has won more championships than any other marque.

=== Champions ===
Championship for drivers
Season	Driver	Car
1973	No drivers' championship (Note: No drivers title 1973–1976.)	
1974	No drivers' championship	
1975	No drivers' championship	
1976	No drivers' championship	
1977	(Italy) Sandro Munari (Note: In 1977 and 1978, the drivers championship was the FIA Cup for Rally Drivers.)	Lancia Stratos HF
1978	(Finland) Markku Alén	Fiat 131 Abarth (Note: Markku Alén drove a Lancia Stratos HF in two rallies in 1978.)
1979	(Sweden) Björn Waldegård	Ford Escort RS1800 (Note: Björn Waldegård drove a Mercedes 450 SLC in two rallies in 1979.)
1980	(West Germany) Walter Röhrl	Fiat 131 Abarth
1981	(Finland) Ari Vatanen	Ford Escort RS1800
1982	(West Germany) Walter Röhrl	Opel Ascona 400
1983	(Finland) Hannu Mikkola	Audi Quattro A1; Audi Quattro A2
1984	(Sweden) Stig Blomqvist	Audi Quattro A2; Audi Sport Quattro S1
1985	(Finland) Timo Salonen	Peugeot 205 Turbo 16; Peugeot 205 Turbo 16 E2
1986	(Finland) Juha Kankkunen	Peugeot 205 Turbo 16 E2
1987	(Finland) Juha Kankkunen	Lancia Delta HF 4WD
1988	(Italy) Miki Biasion	Lancia Delta HF 4WD; Lancia Delta HF Integrale
1989	(Italy) Miki Biasion	Lancia Delta HF Integrale; Lancia Delta HF Integrale 16V
1990	(Spain) Carlos Sainz	Toyota Celica GT-Four ST165
1991	(Finland) Juha Kankkunen	Lancia Delta HF Integrale 16V
1992	(Spain) Carlos Sainz	Toyota Celica Turbo 4WD ST185
1993	(Finland) Juha Kankkunen	Toyota Celica Turbo 4WD ST185
1994	(France) Didier Auriol	Toyota Celica Turbo 4WD ST185
1995	(United Kingdom) Colin McRae	Subaru Impreza 555
1996	(Finland) Tommi Mäkinen	Mitsubishi Lancer Evolution III
1997	(Finland) Tommi Mäkinen	Mitsubishi Lancer Evolution IV
1998	(Finland) Tommi Mäkinen	Mitsubishi Lancer Evolution IV; Mitsubishi Lancer Evolution V
1999	(Finland) Tommi Mäkinen	Mitsubishi Lancer Evolution VI
2000	(Finland) Marcus Grönholm	Peugeot 206 WRC
2001	(United Kingdom) Richard Burns	Subaru Impreza WRC 2001
2002	(Finland) Marcus Grönholm	Peugeot 206 WRC
2003	(Norway) Petter Solberg	Subaru Impreza WRC 2003
2004	(France) Sébastien Loeb	Citroën Xsara WRC
2005	(France) Sébastien Loeb	Citroën Xsara WRC
2006	(France) Sébastien Loeb	Citroën Xsara WRC
2007	(France) Sébastien Loeb	Citroën C4 WRC
2008	(France) Sébastien Loeb	Citroën C4 WRC
2009	(France) Sébastien Loeb	Citroën C4 WRC
2010	(France) Sébastien Loeb	Citroën C4 WRC
2011	(France) Sébastien Loeb	Citroën DS3 WRC
2012	(France) Sébastien Loeb	Citroën DS3 WRC
2013	(France) Sébastien Ogier	Volkswagen Polo R WRC
2014	(France) Sébastien Ogier	Volkswagen Polo R WRC
2015	(France) Sébastien Ogier	Volkswagen Polo R WRC
2016	(France) Sébastien Ogier	Volkswagen Polo R WRC
2017	(France) Sébastien Ogier	Ford Fiesta WRC
2018	(France) Sébastien Ogier	Ford Fiesta WRC
2019	(Estonia) Ott Tänak	Toyota Yaris WRC
2020	(France) Sébastien Ogier	Toyota Yaris WRC
2021	(France) Sébastien Ogier	Toyota Yaris WRC
2022	(Finland) Kalle Rovanperä	Toyota GR Yaris Rally1
2023	(Finland) Kalle Rovanperä	Toyota GR Yaris Rally1
2024	(Belgium) Thierry Neuville	Hyundai i20 N Rally1
2025	(France) Sébastien Ogier	Toyota GR Yaris Rally1
2026	(United Kingdom) Elfyn Evans	Toyota GR Yaris Rally1

Championship for manufacturers
Season	Manufacturer	Car
1973	(France) Alpine-Renault	Alpine-Renault A110 1800
1974	(Italy) Lancia	Lancia Fulvia HF; Lancia Stratos HF
1975	(Italy) Lancia	Lancia Stratos HF
1976	(Italy) Lancia	Lancia Stratos HF
1977	(Italy) Fiat	Fiat 131 Abarth
1978	(Italy) Fiat	Fiat 131 Abarth
1979	(United Kingdom) Ford (Note: Ford Motor Company Limited, a British registered company, was the winning manufacturer. Its cars were homologated via the British ASN, RAC/MSA, thus were considered British under FIA rules, despite any ultimate ownership by, or history related to the Ford Motor Company of Dearborn, Michigan, USA)	Ford Escort RS1800
1980	(Italy) Fiat	Fiat 131 Abarth
1981	(United Kingdom) Talbot	Talbot Sunbeam Lotus
1982	(West Germany) Audi	Audi Quattro
1983	(Italy) Lancia	Lancia Rally 037
1984	(West Germany) Audi	Audi Quattro A2; Audi Sport Quattro S1
1985	(France) Peugeot	Peugeot 205 Turbo 16; Peugeot 205 Turbo 16 E2
1986	(France) Peugeot	Peugeot 205 Turbo 16 E2
1987	(Italy) Lancia	Lancia Delta HF 4WD
1988	(Italy) Lancia	Lancia Delta HF 4WD; Lancia Delta HF Integrale
1989	(Italy) Lancia	Lancia Delta HF Integrale; Lancia Delta HF Integrale 16V
1990	(Italy) Lancia	Lancia Delta HF Integrale 16V
1991	(Italy) Lancia	Lancia Delta HF Integrale 16V
1992	(Italy) Lancia	Lancia Delta HF Integrale Evo
1993	(Japan) Toyota	Toyota Celica Turbo 4WD ST185
1994	(Japan) Toyota	Toyota Celica Turbo 4WD ST185
1995	(Japan) Subaru	Subaru Impreza 555
1996	(Japan) Subaru	Subaru Impreza 555
1997	(Japan) Subaru	Subaru Impreza WRC 97
1998	(Japan) Mitsubishi	Mitsubishi Lancer Evolution IV; Mitsubishi Lancer Evolution V
1999	(Japan) Toyota	Toyota Corolla WRC
2000	(France) Peugeot	Peugeot 206 WRC
2001	(France) Peugeot	Peugeot 206 WRC
2002	(France) Peugeot	Peugeot 206 WRC
2003	(France) Citroën	Citroën Xsara WRC
2004	(France) Citroën	Citroën Xsara WRC
2005	(France) Citroën	Citroën Xsara WRC
2006	(United Kingdom) Ford	Ford Focus RS WRC 06
2007	(United Kingdom) Ford	Ford Focus RS WRC 06; Ford Focus RS WRC 07
2008	(France) Citroën	Citroën C4 WRC
2009	(France) Citroën	Citroën C4 WRC
2010	(France) Citroën	Citroën C4 WRC
2011	(France) Citroën	Citroën DS3 WRC
2012	(France) Citroën	Citroën DS3 WRC
2013	(Germany) Volkswagen	Volkswagen Polo R WRC
2014	(Germany) Volkswagen	Volkswagen Polo R WRC
2015	(Germany) Volkswagen	Volkswagen Polo R WRC
2016	(Germany) Volkswagen	Volkswagen Polo R WRC
2017	(United Kingdom) M-Sport (Note: M-Sport were not an official Ford team from 2013 to 2017, entering under a waiver to the rule insisting on manufacturer association.)	Ford Fiesta WRC
2018	(Japan) Toyota	Toyota Yaris WRC
2019	(South Korea) Hyundai	Hyundai i20 Coupe WRC
2020	(South Korea) Hyundai	Hyundai i20 Coupe WRC
2021	(Japan) Toyota	Toyota Yaris WRC
2022	(Japan) Toyota	Toyota GR Yaris Rally1
2023	(Japan) Toyota	Toyota GR Yaris Rally1
2024	(Japan) Toyota	Toyota GR Yaris Rally1
2025	(Japan) Toyota	Toyota GR Yaris Rally1
2026	(Japan) Toyota	Toyota GR Yaris Rally1

=== Event wins ===
Updated after 2026 Rally de Portugal. Drivers and manufacturers who have participated in the 2026 World Rally Championship are in bold.

Wins by driver
	Driver	Total
1	(France) Sébastien Loeb	80
2	(France) **Sébastien Ogier**	68
3	(Finland) Marcus Grönholm	30
4	(Spain) Carlos Sainz	26
5	(United Kingdom) Colin McRae	25
6	(Finland) Tommi Mäkinen	24
7	(Finland) Juha Kankkunen	23
7	(Belgium) **Thierry Neuville**	23
9	(Estonia) Ott Tänak	22
10	(France) Didier Auriol	20

Driver wins by nationality
	Nation	Total
1	France	215
2	Finland	198
3	(United Kingdom) Great Britain	52
4	Sweden	45
5	Italy	30
5	Spain	30
7	Estonia	27
8	Belgium	24
9	Germany	17
9	Norway	17

Wins by manufacturer
	Manufacturer	Total
1	(Japan) **Toyota**	111
2	(France) Citroën	102
3	(United Kingdom) **Ford**	94
4	(Italy) Lancia	73
5	(France) Peugeot	48
6	(Japan) Subaru	47
7	(Germany) Volkswagen	44
8	(South Korea) **Hyundai**	35
9	(Japan) Mitsubishi	34
10	(Germany) Audi	24

== Video games and esports ==
There have been many video games based on the World Rally Championship, and due to lack of licenses, many more based on only certain cars, drivers or events. Sega Rally, released in 1995, as well as V-Rally and Top Gear Rally in 1997 were primarily arcade racing games with little emphasis on realistic damage or physics. The Colin McRae Rally series introduced in 1998 was the first to incorporate a more realistic simulation racing feel to the genre. Rally Trophy, released in 2001 for Microsoft Windows by Bugbear, concentrated on historic cars such as Alpine A110 and Lancia Stratos. RalliSport Challenge, released in 2002 for Windows and Xbox by Digital Illusions CE, featured classic Group B cars and hillclimb models along with modern WRC cars.

The first fully FIA licensed WRC: World Rally Championship was released in 2001 for PlayStation 2 by Evolution Studios. The video game series had its fifth game, WRC: Rally Evolved, in 2005. Racing simulator Richard Burns Rally, released in 2004 for several platforms, has gathered recognition for its realism. Recent top-selling games include Colin McRae: DiRT 2, Sega Rally Revo and Dirt 3. Gran Turismo 5 includes WRC licensed cars from manufacturers such as Subaru and Ford. In October 2010, Black Bean Games released WRC: FIA World Rally Championship which features the cars, drivers and events of the 2010 World Rally Championship, including those from the three support categories. A downloadable patch was produced allowing players to drive in Group B cars such as the Audi Quattro. Various cars whose participated in the WRC such as Mitsubishi Lancer WRC and Ford Fiesta RS WRC have also appeared in the Facebook game Car Town. The WRC video game license was acquired by French game development studio Kylotonn from Milestone srl after the release of WRC 4: FIA World Rally Championship in 2013. The first WRC game by Kylotonn was WRC 5, released in 2015, with successive releases on a near-annual basis with WRC Generations due in 2022. The WRC license passed to Codemasters for the period of 2023 to 2027.

eSports WRC is an online championship run via the latest official video game. Beginning in 2016, the championship is free and open to anybody with a copy of the game. Each esports season ends with a Grand Finale with competitors gathering for an on-site event to race each other, usually in the service park of an actual rally event. Previous eSports WRC champion Jon Armstrong is also a physical rally driver, and racehouse Williams run a team.
