= Éric Boullier =

French engineer and manager

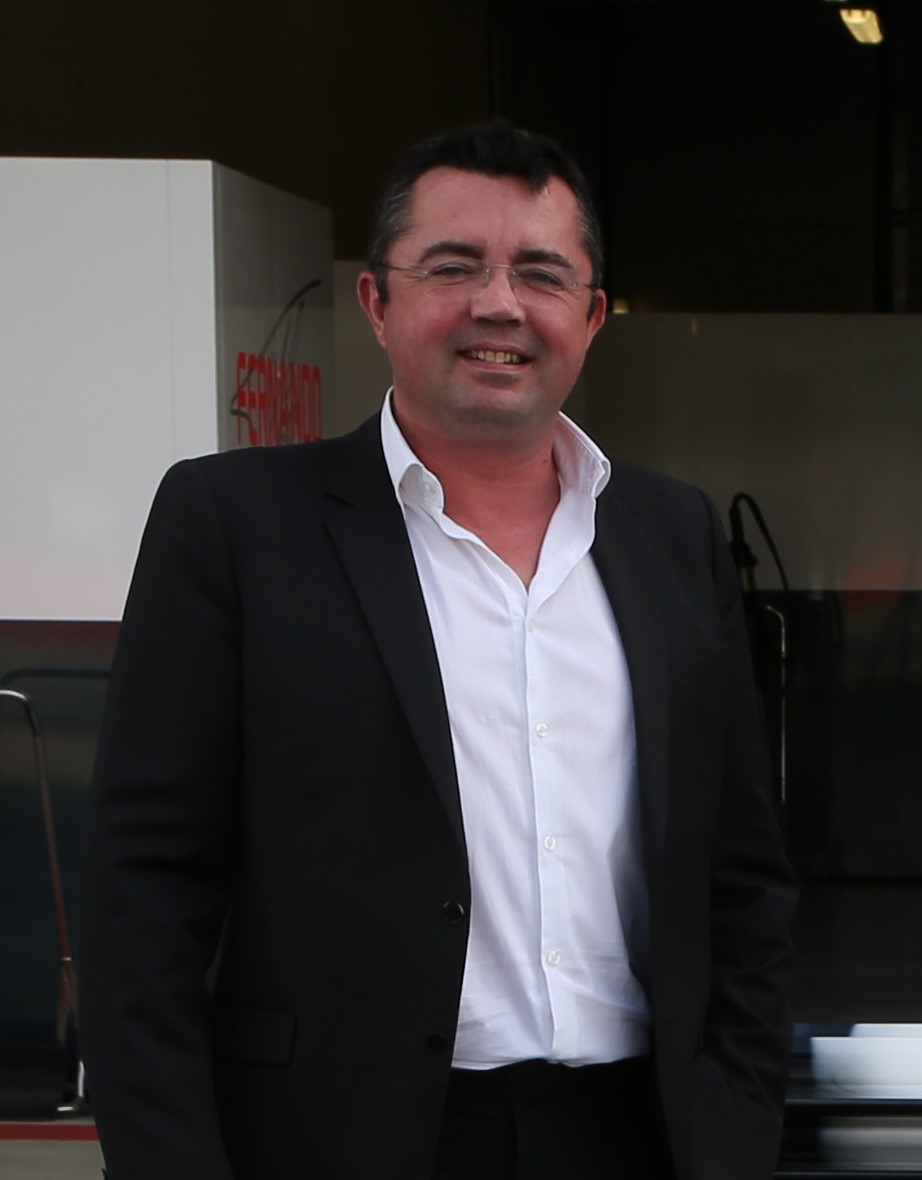
- Éric Boullier in 2015
- Born: Éric René Boullier; 9 November 1973 (age 53); Laval, France
- Education: Aerospace engineer
- Alma mater: Institut Polytechnique des Sciences Avancées

Éric René Boullier (born 9 November 1973) is a French motor racing engineer and manager who is chief executive officer of WRC Promoter GmbH, the commercial rights holder and promoter of the World Rally Championship and European Rally Championship. He was the racing director of the McLaren F1 Team from 2014 to 2018. During the 2010 to 2013 seasons, he was the team principal of Lotus F1, and vice chairman of Formula One Teams Association (FOTA) until it was disbanded after six years.

== Career ==
Boullier is a graduate of the French Institut Polytechnique des Sciences Appliquées engineering school where he studied aeronautical and spacecraft engineering. In 2002, he took the position of chief engineer with the Spanish Racing Engineering team, in charge of its World Series by Nissan programme.

In early 2003, he moved to the French DAMS team to become the managing and technical director, including the A1 Team France operation.

At the end of 2008, Boullier became the CEO of Gravity Sport Management, where he was in charge of many young drivers including Ho-Pin Tung, Adrien Tambay, Jérôme d'Ambrosio and Christian Vietoris.

After the 2009 season, the Renault F1 team was bought-into by investment company Genii Capital. One of Genii's leading figures is Gerard Lopez, who is a major backer of Gravity Sport. On 5 January 2010, Boullier was announced as the new team principal, despite never having worked in Formula One before. The Renault F1 team finished fifth in the World Constructors' Championship in 2010 and, following Renault's withdrawal, the newly named Lotus Renault GP team finished fifth in the World Constructors' Championship in 2011. For 2012, Boullier remained as team principal, which was renamed again to Lotus F1 Team. He continued in that role for the 2013 season.

On 24 January 2014, Boullier resigned as Team Principal for Lotus F1 Team Limited. Gérard Lopez assumed responsibilities as Lotus F1 Team Principal with immediate effect.

On 29 January 2014, Boullier was appointed racing director of the McLaren Formula One racing team under Ron Dennis, chairman and chief executive officer of McLaren Group. The announcement was made as part of a larger senior management overhaul at McLaren Group's racing unit.

On 4 July 2018 he announced his resignation from McLaren Racing.

In February 2019, Boullier joined the French Grand Prix organization as strategic sports and operational advisor and ambassador, and was named managing director in January 2020.

On 31 July 2026, Boullier was appointed chief executive officer of WRC Promoter GmbH, the commercial rights holder and promoter of the World Rally Championship and European Rally Championship. His appointment followed the acquisition of WRC Promoter by French automotive company Cosmobilis and investment firm Park Square Capital.

=== EnduroKA ===
In 2019, Boullier briefly raced in the inaugural EnduroKA Season for 2002–2008 spec Ford KAs.
